= List of Unsolved Mysteries episodes =

Unsolved Mysteries is an American documentary television show, that presents actual/non-fiction media segments. Mainly ranging from unsolved, cold, controversial, critical, disputed, or unexplained crimes and criminal cases; wanted fugitives who are at large; missing individuals; and paranormal occurrences. The program also occasionally features segments from individuals suffering from amnesia/memory loss; urban legends and myths; child abduction/kidnapping cases; accused parties of a crime who claim their innocence; deceased individuals in which their family/next of kin is yet to be located; and individuals looking to be reunited with lost connections/family members.

It began with a series of television specials, airing on NBC from 1987 to 1988. These specials were each individually hosted by several different actors, such as Raymond Burr (in the pilot special), Karl Malden (in the following two specials), and Robert Stack (for the remaining specials, with Stack later becoming the permanent staple host of the franchise).

Due to the popularity of the specials, the program hosted by Stack, was picked up in 1988 and aired a total of nine seasons on NBC. The series was then acquired by CBS in 1997, adding actress Virginia Madsen (as a co-host alongside Stack, announcing special alerts, bulletins and updates), where it continued for a short run of 2 seasons. In 2001, Lifetime acquired the series, with Stack returning to acting as lone host, where it finished its original run in 2002, followed shortly by the death of Stack.

The series ran re-runs of NBC, CBS, and Lifetime episodes in syndication for a number of years until it was resurrected by Spike TV (Now known as the Paramount Network) in 2008. The new series featured actor Dennis Farina as host. However, the Spike TV series did not include any new cases or segments; and instead the program included digitally enhanced and edited older cases that were already featured on NBC, CBS and Lifetime, and if applicable, added updated information. This edition was discontinued in 2010.

In 2020, the series returned with all-new episodes and a new format on Netflix. This version of the program, contains no host or narrator, (although a portrait of Stack is featured at the end of the opening credits) and instead gives a more candid documentary/reality television/true crime/personal view of each case. Also graphic language is uncensored.

As of October 2, 2024, 611 episodes of Unsolved Mysteries have been released.

== Series overview ==
The following is a list of Unsolved Mysteries episodes and specials.

Please note this list contains first-run/broadcast episodes only. A spin-off special court show series titled Final Appeal: From The Files of Unsolved Mysteries, which has cases of accused criminals claiming their innocence, is not inherently considered part of the main Unsolved Mysteries broadcast history, however, these episodes were all later shown as episodes in the Spike TV version of the show. In 2019, FilmRise released the original series to various streaming platforms. However, they are in incorrect production order, and have removed specific segments due to statute of limitations or at the request of families.

Season	Episodes	Originally released		
Season	Episodes	First released	Last released	Network
Specials	7	January 20, 1987	May 18, 1988	NBC
1	28	October 5, 1988	September 13, 1989	NBC
2	31	September 20, 1989	September 12, 1990	NBC
3	33	September 19, 1990	September 11, 1991	NBC
4	37	September 18, 1991	September 9, 1992	NBC
5	35	September 16, 1992	September 15, 1993	NBC
6	33	September 22, 1993	September 18, 1994	NBC
7	30	September 25, 1994	August 30, 1995	NBC
8	30	October 20, 1995	September 13, 1996	NBC
9	27	September 20, 1996	August 8, 1997	NBC
10	6	November 13, 1997	May 29, 1998	CBS
11	6	April 2, 1999	June 11, 1999	CBS
12	55	July 2, 2001	April 29, 2002	Lifetime
13	48	June 10, 2002	September 20, 2002	Lifetime
14	175	October 13, 2008	April 27, 2010	Spike
15	12	July 1, 2020	October 19, 2020	Netflix
16	9	October 18, 2022	November 1, 2022	Netflix
17	9	July 31, 2024	October 2, 2024	Netflix
Unmasking the Tylenol Killer		October 9, 2026		The Roku Channel

== Episodes ==
=== Specials (1987–88) ===
No. overall	No. in specials	Mystery	Host	Original release date	Rating/share (households)
1	1	No Category: Donald Kemp. No Category: Roger Wheeler; Brian Halloran; John Callahan. No Category: The Family of Pat Mealbach. No Category with Update: Terry Lee Conner and Joseph Dougherty. FBI Ten Most Wanted Fugitives List: Leo Koury; Donald Eugene Webb; Victor Gerena; Claude Dallas; James Dyess; Danny Weeks; Thomas Harrelson; Robert Litchfield	Raymond Burr	January 20, 1987	17.1/29
2	2	No Category: Wanda Jean Mays. No Category: John Burns. No Category: Kyra Cook. No Category: Rolex Robbers. No Category: Robert Weeks	Karl Malden	May 25, 1987	18.3/30
3	3	Wanted: The Unabomber. Updates: John Burns; Robert Weeks. Lost Loves: John Lutter. Final Appeal: Glenn Consagra. Lost Heirs: Heirs of George Marsh	Karl Malden	September 24, 1987	17.9/32
4	4	Wanted: David Davis. Updates: Heirs of George Marsh. Unexplained Death: Aileen Conway. Mysterious Legends: Glen and Bessie Hyde. Missing Persons: Dottie Caylor	Robert Stack	November 29, 1987	12.6/20
5	5	Wanted: Jerry Strickland; Missy Munday. Final Appeal: Michael Martin. Unexplained Death: Kurt McFall. Lost Heirs with Update: Heirs of Charlie Scheel	Robert Stack	February 5, 1988	14.8/26
6	6	The Unexplained: Dorothy Allison. Update: Jerry Strickland; Missy Munday. Wanted with Update: Steve Hadley. Lost Loves: Undelivered WWII Letters	Robert Stack	May 6, 1988	11.9/23
7	7	Amnesia: Doreen Picard. Fraud: Louis Carlucci. Updates: Robert Weeks; Roger Wheeler. Wanted: Diane Brodbeck; Jon Yount. Treasure: Beale's Treasure	Robert Stack	May 18, 1988	17.0/28

=== Season 1 (1988–89) ===
No. overall	No. in season	Mystery	Original release date	U.S. viewers (millions)
8	1	The Unexplained: Gulf Breeze UFO. Solved: Louis Carlucci. Wanted: Joe Shepherd. Missing Persons: Gail DeLano	October 5, 1988	20.9
9	2	Mysterious Legends: D. B. Cooper. Solved: Diane Brodbeck; Jon Yount. Updates: Steve Hadley. Unexplained Death: Don Henry and Kevin Ives. Fraud: Dennis Walker	October 12, 1988	22.7
10	3	The Unexplained: The Queen Mary. The Unexplained: Tallman House. The Unexplained: The General Wayne Inn. The Unexplained: Tatum House	October 26, 1988	21.8
11	4	Unexplained Death: Son of Sam Part 1. Lost Heirs: Heirs of Walter Green. Unexplained Death: Harold and Thelma Swain. Wanted: Chevy Chase Bandit; John William Farr; Shotgun Bandit; Shopping Bag Bandits	November 2, 1988	20.0
12	5	Fraud: Bob Dozier and John Russell; Kristen Tomlin and Suzanne Russell. Solved: Rolex Robbers. Lost Loves: The Father of Janet O'Regan. Unexplained Death: Son of Sam Part 2. Missing Persons: Annie Hearin	November 9, 1988	23.5
13	6	Missing Persons: Christi Nichols. Solved: Gail DeLano. Wanted: Mark Adams. Fraud: Steven Cox. Unexplained Death: Barbara Jean Horn.	November 16, 1988	25.2
14	7	Unexplained Death: Kurt Sova. Solved: Shopping Bag Bandits. No Category: Bob Dozier and John Russell; Kristen Tomlin and Suzanne Russell. Fraud: Lancaster Extortion Writer. Unexplained Death: Father Reynaldo Rivera; Father John Kerrigan. The Unexplained: Mystery Rock.	November 23, 1988	20.3
15	8	Wanted: Ann Sigmin and Garey Goff. Updates: Don Henry and Kevin Ives. Updates: Steven Cox. The Unexplained: Robert Matthews; Kristina Florence. Missing Persons: Rogest Cain.	November 30, 1988	27.5
16	9	Amnesia: Jenny Pratt. Solved: Joe Shepherd. Fraud: Jack Quinn. Unexplained Death: Clarence and Geneva Roberts. No Category: Bruno and Bobo.	December 14, 1988	28.5
17	10	Lost Loves: Philip Pelletier. Solved: Lancaster Extortion Writer. No Category: Steven Cox. Missing Persons: Matthew Chase. Unexplained Death: Marilu Geri. Lost Loves: The Family of Dolores Valadez.	December 21, 1988	22.7
18	11	Wanted: Lee Selwyn. Solved: Steven Cox. Missing Persons: Michael Rosenblum. Updates: Rogest Cain. Fraud: Arthur Frankford.	January 11, 1989	30.0
19	12	Missing Persons: Jeremy Bright. Unexplained Death with Update: John Martin. Lost Heirs: Heirs of Dan Willans. Wanted: Leo Koury. Wanted: Michaela Garecht; Amber Swartz. Missing Persons: The Crew of the Liebling	January 18, 1989	30.6
20	13	Wanted: Micki Jo West. Solved: David Davis. Lost Loves: The Brother of Sylvia Wemhoff; Margaret Murphy. Missing Persons: Marlene Santana; Carlina White; Christopher Abeyta. Unexplained Death: The Bald Mountain Shooters. Fraud: Robert Leads.	January 25, 1989	30.2
21	14	The Unexplained: Face on Mars. Updates: Arthur Frankford. Unexplained Death: Kathy Hobbs. Solved: Philip Pelletier. Lost Loves: Jackie Harrington. Missing Persons: Angelo Desideri	February 1, 1989	30.5
22	15	No Category: Frank Morris and the Anglin Brothers. No Category: Jean Marie Gagnon; Thomas Nauss Jr.; Carl Alfred Eder; Lena Regina Smith; Joseph Mancini.	February 8, 1989	26.5
23	16	Unexplained Death: Mickey and Trudy Thompson. Updates: The Bald Mountain Shooters. Wanted: Crazy Glue Bandit. Mysterious Legends: Bigfoot. Lost Heirs: Heirs of George J. Stein. Unexplained Death: Joyce McLain Updates: Jean Marie Gagnon.	February 15, 1989	29.4
24	17	Wanted: Burrowing Burglars. The Unexplained: Kristle Merzlock; Thomas Sawyer. Updates: Robert Leads No Category: Walter Wenke; Ronald Denslow. Unexplained Death: Permon Gilbert.	February 22, 1989	27.5
25	18	Wanted: Donald Smith. Mysterious Legends: Brushy Bill Roberts. Solved: Jean Marie Gagnon Wanted: Charles Mule.	March 1, 1989	28.2
26	19	Unexplained Death: Lisa Marie Kimmell. Updates: Louis Carlucci. Treasure: Lost Dutchman Mine. Missing Persons: Thomas Hotard and Audrey Moate.	March 15, 1989	29.1
27	20	Wanted: John Mooney. Fraud: Liz Carmichael. Updates: Annie Hearin Unexplained Death: Terri McClure. Missing Persons: Charles Wickman.	April 5, 1989	25.5
28	21	Unexplained Death: Dexter Stefonek. Fraud: Jorge Cortez. Updates: Heirs of Dan Willans Wanted: Fumbles. Wanted: Michael and Sharon Mohon. No Category: Larry Dennis Miller; Curtis Watson; Joseph Hutchinson.	April 12, 1989	25.1
29	22	Unexplained Death: Gus Hoffman. Updates: Matthew Chase Fraud: Ron Rushton. Unexplained Death: Patsy Wright. Lost Loves: The Families of the S.S. Muskogee Crew.	April 26, 1989	24.1
30	23	Wanted: Julie Cross. Updates: Angelo Desideri Wanted: Bicycle Bandit. Wanted: Kathy Power. Mysterious Legends: Charles Nungesser and Francois Coli.	May 3, 1989	22.4
31	24	Treasure: Victorio Peak Treasure. Missing Persons: Kari Lynn Nixon. Wanted: David Rhodes.	May 10, 1989	26.1
32	25	Wanted: Sheldon Weinberg. The Unexplained: Gulf Breeze UFO (repeat from October 5, 1988). Wanted: Joe Shepherd (repeat from October 5, 1988 and December 14, 1988).	May 17, 1989	21.4
33	26	Unexplained Death: Barbara Jean Horn (repeat from November 16, 1988). Fraud: Liz Carmichael (repeat from April 5, 1989). Lost Loves: The Brother of Sylvia Wemhoff; Margaret Murphy (repeat from January 25, 1989).	August 16, 1989	19.4
34	27	Unexplained Death: Mike Riemer; Diane Robertson. Updates: David Rhodes. Lost Loves: Jackie Harrington (repeat from February 1, 1989). Unexplained Death: Patsy Wright (repeat from April 26, 1989). Updates: Michael and Sharon Mohon.	September 6, 1989	20.9
35	28	Unconfirmed Category: Todd McAfee. Updates: Ronald Denslow; Joseph Hutchinson. Treasure: Victorio Peak Treasure (repeat from May 10, 1989). Lost Loves: The Families of the S.S. Muskogee Crew (repeat from April 26, 1989).	September 13, 1989	19.6

=== Season 2 (1989–90) ===
No. overall	No. in season	Mystery	Original release date	U.S. viewers (millions)
36	1	Lost Loves: Lt. Karen Stephens. Legend: Roswell Crash. Missing: Tara Calico and Michael Henley. Update: "Wanted: Charles Mule"	September 20, 1989	29.2
37	2	Murder: Jack Brown. Mystery: Blinking Crucifix. Wanted: William Eugene Hilliard. Wanted: Robert Dennie, Melvin Edward Mays, and Leslie Isben Rogge. Update: "Wanted: Sheldon Weinberg"	September 27, 1989	25.1
38	3	Murder: Kay Hall. Mystery: New York Coin Scam. Mystery: Mabel Wood. Missing: The Crew of the Sarah Joe. Missing: Avery James Norris. Update: "Lost Loves: Lt. Karen Stephens"	October 11, 1989	23.0
39	4	Wanted: Chief Greg Webb. Lost loves: Billie and Joey Rogers. Wanted: Gary and Terry Magno. Gene Kiley tracks down owners of unclaimed money. Update: "Wanted: John Mooney"	October 18, 1989	29.0
40	5	Missing: Dale Kerstetter. Legend: Marfa Lights. Murder: Jay Cook and Tanya Van Cuylenborg. Wanted: Bonnie Wilder. Missing: Julie Weflen. Missing: Stefanie Stroh. Missing: Kyle Clinkscales. Missing: Carlos Alvarez. Missing: Diana Braungardt. Missing: David Tyll and Brian Ognjan. Missing: John Simmons. Missing: Lily Mae Huff. Missing: David Thies. Missing: Susan Cappel. Update: "Lost loves: The Brother of Sylvia Wemhoff"	October 25, 1989	26.7
41	6	Mystery: Rudolf Hess. Missing: Patricia Meehan. Murder: Tina Jefferson. Update: "Wanted: Louis Carlucci". Update: "Wanted: Gary and Terry Magno". Update: "Lost loves: Billie and Joey Rogers"	November 1, 1989	28.8
42	7	Mystery: Doyle Wheeler. Wanted: Salvatore Caruana. Fugitive Roll Call: Wanted: Lavada Floyd, Richard Joseph Alvarado, William McGeehee, Alvaro Zapata, and Richard Green. Wanted: Gene Flannes. Murder: Rachael Runyan. Update: "Wanted: Charles Wickman"	November 8, 1989	29.1
43	8	Murder: Rhonda Hinson. Wanted: Ann Corricelli and Lena Marie Wilson. Lost heirs: Heirs of Howard Drummond. Mystery: Don Hamilton. Update: "Wanted: William Eugene Hilliard"	November 15, 1989	26.7
44	9	Mystery: Sonny Liston. Missing: Elizabeth Campbell. Lost loves: Bill and Cynthia Zelinski. Wanted: Crash and Dash Robbers. Update: "Lost loves: Billie and Joey Rogers"	November 22, 1989	24.1
45	10	Wanted: Maria Armstrong. Lost loves: The Friend of Stephan Ross. Murder: Ralph Sigler. Wanted: Charles Wilson Chester. Wanted: Medusa Bandit, Garbage Bag Bandit, and Shorts Robber. Update: "Wanted: Robert Dennie"	November 29, 1989	28.7
46	11	Wanted: John Hawkins. Wanted: Woody Kelly. Wanted: David Fisher/Murder: Laura Burbank. Murder: Carla Wright, Michella Welch, Jenny Bastian. Lost loves: The Siblings of LeeAnn Robinson. Update: "Wanted: Leslie Ibsen Rogge"	December 6, 1989	22.7
47	12	Wanted: Ed Barbara. Mystery: Rae Ann Mossor. Lost loves: The Children of Georgia Tann. Wanted: Donald Eugene Webb. Update: "Missing: Avery James Norris"	December 13, 1989	25.4
48	13	Mystery: Sharon Elliott (Hatbox baby). Mystery: Dr. John Branion/Murder: Donna Branion. Lost Loves: Alberta Elaine	December 20, 1989	25.1
49	14	Missing: Cynthia Anderson. Mystery: West End Baptist Church. Wanted: Melvine Aprile/Missing: Tony and Sherri Aprile. Murder: The Signal Mountain Murders. Wanted: Wardell Ford and Larry Chism. Update: "Wanted: Ann Correcelli and Lena Marie Wilson"	January 3, 1990	28.9
50	15	Murder: George Conniff. Update: "Wanted: Liz Carmichael". Murder: Jack Brown (repeat from September 27, 1989). Legend: Blinking Crucifix (repeat from September 27, 1989). Wanted: William Eugene Hilliard (repeat from September 27, 1989)	January 10, 1990	27.8
51	16	Wanted: Brayman Road Attacker. Missing: Ray Hickingbotham. Murder: Kevin Hughes. Lost loves: Robert Miller. Update: "Wanted: Ann Sigmin"	January 17, 1990	29.5
52	17	Murder: Mark Groezinger. Missing: Leticia Hernandez, Jessica Gutierrez, David Borer, and Malakia Logan. Legend: Roswell Crash (repeat from September 20, 1989). Missing: Tara Calico and Michael Henley (repeat from September 20, 1989)	January 24, 1990	29.8
53	18	Legend: United Kingdom Crop Circles. Murder: Kenneth Dungee. Missing: Keith Reinhard. FBI Alert: William Slagle and Rafael Rodriguez. Update: "Lost loves: Bill and Cynthia Zelinski"	January 31, 1990	27.8
54	19	Murder: Charles Morgan. Legend: Ogopogo. Wanted: Marvin and Sandra Maple/Missing: Kristi and Bobby Baskin. Update: "Lost: The Siblings of LeeAnn Robinson"	February 7, 1990	27.3
55	20	Update: "Wanted: Robert Weeks. Update: "Wanted: Steven Cox". Update: "Wanted: John Mooney". Update: "Legend: Victorio Peak Treasure". Update: "Wanted: John Burns". Update: "Wanted: David Davis/Murder: Shannon Davis". Update: "Lost loves: Billie and Joey Rogers". Update: "Lost loves: Lt. Stephens". Mystery: Jenny Pratt (repeat from December 4, 1988). Mystery: Pat Mealbach (repeat from January 20, 1987)	February 11, 1990	20.8
56	21	Mystery: Georgia Rudolph. Murder: Steve Sandlin. Wanted: John "Thumper" Brown	February 14, 1990	27.8
57	22	Wanted: Joe Owens. Lost loves: The Nanny of Jackie Cooper. Missing: Alejandro Espinosa. Wanted: Dale Hyde. Update: "Wanted: Marvin and Sandra Maple/Missing: Kristi and Bobby Baskin"	February 21, 1990	26.9
58	23	Lost loves: Linda Sharp. Wanted: Gertrude Pruett. Mystery: William L. Toomey. Murder: Dan Short. Update: "Wanted: David Fisher/Murder: Laura Burbank"	March 21, 1990	24.8
59	24	Lost loves: Laurence Harding Jr. Wanted: Pedro Uribe, Hugo Balbin, Luis and Ivan Arango and Miguel Villegas. Wanted: Elmer Locker Jr., John and Cecilia Kealing. Wanted: Sweetheart Swindler. Wanted: Gainesville Killers. Update: "Wanted: Fumbles"	March 28, 1990	29.3
60	25	Mystery: Kristina Smith. Update: "Wanted: John "Thumper" Brown". Update: "Murder: Kay Hall". Mystery: New York Coin Scam (repeat from October 11, 1989). Mystery: Mabel Wood (repeat from October 11, 1989)	April 4, 1990	27.0
61	26	Murder: Teresita Basa. Wanted: Dewey Demetro. Lost loves: Jean Anne Freeman. Murder: The Las Cruces Bowling Alley Massacre. Update: "Lost loves: Linda Sharp"	April 25, 1990	24.7
62	27	Mystery: Mark Newman and Gerald Levy, Donald M. and Louis G. Smith, Lavona and Lavelda Rowe-Richardson. Wanted: Jesus Penalver and Julio Marco Cruz. Wanted: Boston Rapist. Legend: The Bannack Treasure. Update: "Wanted: Elmer Locker Jr."	May 2, 1990	26.4
63	28	Mystery: Robert Kennedy Assassination. Lost loves: Jackie Purinton (repeat from February 1, 1989). Missing: Elizabeth Campbell (repeat from November 22, 1989). Update: "Missing: Avery James Norris" (repeat from December 13, 1989)	May 16, 1990	22.4
64	29	Murder: Ralph Probst. Mystery: Kristina Smith (repeat from April 4, 1990). Wanted: Dale Hyde (repeat from February 21, 1990). Update: "Wanted: Fumbles" (repeat from March 28, 1990). Wanted: Crash and Dash Robbers (repeat from November 22, 1989)	August 22, 1990	21.6
65	30	Missing: Marlena Childress. Update: "Wanted: Gertrude Pruett". Mystery: Sonny Liston (repeat from November 22, 1989). Lost loves: Jean Anne Freeman (repeat from April 25, 1990)	September 5, 1990	19.6
66	31	Murder: Gretchen Burford. Update: "Legend: United Kingdom Crop Circles". Update: "Lost: Robert Wilson". Missing: Micki Jo West (repeat from January 25, 1989)	September 12, 1990	20.2

=== Season 3 (1990–91) ===
No. overall	No. in season	Mystery	Original release date	U.S. viewers (millions)
67	1	Legend: The Kecksburg UFO. Mystery: Stockton Arsonist. FBI Alert: Mike Cline, Raymond Scoville, Thomas Geers, and Michael Lassen. Update: "Lost loves: The Daughter of Lavar Bates"	September 19, 1990	25.9
68	2	Legend: Bermuda Triangle. Wanted: Clay Taylor/Murder: Eugene Bailey. Lost loves: Thomas Heck. Wanted: Shooters of C.W. Roddy	September 26, 1990	21.8
69	3	Wanted: Dr. Kenneth Frank. Missing: Dan Wilson. Wanted: Minnesota Brinks Heist. Update: "Mystery: Stockton Arsonist". Update: "Legend: Gulf Breeze UFO Incident"	October 3, 1990	24.3
70	4	Murder: Stanley Gryziec. Wanted: Kevin Poulsen a.k.a. Dark Dante. Lost loves: Charita Harding. Mystery: KROQ Confession/Murder: Angela Cummings. Update: "Wanted: Ed Barbara"	October 10, 1990	25.1
71	5	Missing: Lisa Bishop and The Crew of the Freedon/Wanted: Florian Bourch. Missing: Adam Hecht. Legend: Lunersee Lake Treasure. Wanted: Edgar Kerns and Kay Beeman. Update: "Wanted: Maria Armstrong". Update: "Lost loves: Charita Harding"	October 17, 1990	22.5
72	6	Mystery: Rena Paquette/Murder: Danny Paquette. Wanted: Robert Corrado. Lost loves: Martha Hinkle. Wanted: Kenneth Stanton. Update: "Lost loves: The Children of Georgia Tann"	October 24, 1990	23.1
73	7	Legend: The Gray Man's Ghost at Pawley's Island. Missing: David Stone. Mystery: Katie. Update: "Mystery: Georgia Rudolph". Update: "Wanted: Kenneth Stanton"	October 31, 1990	24.8
74	8	Legend: The Disappearance of Amelia Earhart. Wanted: Richard Church/Murder: Raymond and Ruth Ann Ritter. Mystery: Dr. Iben Browning. Update: "Missing: Kari Lynn Nixon"	November 7, 1990	28.2
75	9	Missing: The Sons of Jim Fontes/Wanted: Catherine and James Durkin. Murder: O'Neal Moore. Mystery: Victoria Doroshenko. Wanted: Cowboy Bandit. Update: "Mystery: Stockton Arsonist"	November 14, 1990	24.7
76	10	Murder: Norman Ladner. Murder: Dwayne McCorkendale. Legend: Loretto Chapel. Missing: Nyleen Marshall. Update: "Lost loves: Charita Harding"	November 21, 1990	23.3
77	11	Mystery: Coral Polge. Mystery: Johnny Lee Wilson. Murder: Kenneth Engie. Update: "Wanted: Melvine Aprile/Missing: Tony and Sherri Aprile"	November 28, 1990	25.5
78	12	Murder: Morris Davis. Legend: Skeleton Canyon Treasure. Wanted: Attacker of Debby. Lost heirs: Heirs of Dorothea Allen	December 5, 1990	24.0
79	13	Missing: Mark Dennis. Wanted: Ricardo Caputo. Mystery: Vancouver Lights. Update: "Wanted: Kenneth Stanton"	December 12, 1990	25.6
80	14	Murder: Debbie Wolfe. Murder: Conradina Olson. Missing: Geoffrey Sullivan. Update: "Wanted: Edgar Kerns and Kay Beeman"	December 19, 1990	24.1
81	15	Missing: Judith Hyams. Murder: Ralph Probst (repeat from August 22, 1990). Mystery: Mark Newman and Gerald Levy, Donald M. and Louis G. Keith, Lavona and Lavelda Rowe-Richardson (repeat from May 2, 1990). Murder: Gretchen Burford (repeat from September 12, 1990)	January 2, 1991	27.3
82	16	Murder: Russell Evans. Wanted: William Bradford Bishop. Legend: Adams' Treasure. Wanted: Thomas Hickey and William McCarthy, Arthur Lee Washington Jr., and Juan Jackson. Update: "Missing: Sons of Jim Fontes"	January 9, 1991	26.0
83	17	Wanted: Patrick Michael Mitchell. Wanted: Jockey Bandit, Mr. Nasty, and Mary Poppins Bandit. Lost loves: The Family of Victor Simon. Wanted: Joe Smith. Legend: Kelsey House	January 23, 1991	25.7
84	18	Murder: Tracy Kirkpatrick. Wanted: Steve Wilson. Lost loves: Frank Bloomer. Wanted: John Irwin. Update: "Legend: The Disappearance of Amelia Earhart"	January 30, 1991	24.0
85	19	Mystery: Betty Cash and Vickie Landrum. Wanted: Obia-Man. Lost loves: Vicki Acs. Update: "Missing: Monica Bonilla/Missing: Nyleen Marshall"	February 6, 1991	25.7
86	20	Murder: Cindy James. Mystery: Butch Cassidy. Wanted: Melody Martin/Missing: Paloma Gibson. Lost loves: The Siblings of Aleatha Evertz	February 13, 1991	24.3
87	21	Mystery: The Mad Butcher of Kingsbury Run. Wanted: Chuck Smith/Missing: Charles and Christopher Smith. Murder: Michael Francke. Missing: Oded Gordon. Update: "Wanted: Thomas Hickey and William McCarthy, Arthur Lee Washington Jr., and Juan Jackson"	February 20, 1991	24.7
88	22	Wanted: Edward Maynard. Legend: The Kecksburg UFO (repeat from September 19, 1990). Update: "Lost loves: The Daughter of Lavar Bates" (repeat from September 19, 1990)	February 27, 1991	26.7
89	23	Mystery: Edgar Cayce. Mystery: Crystal Spencer. Wanted: Dennis DePue. Update: "Wanted: John Irwin". Update: "Missing: Judith Hyams". Update: "Wanted: Joe Smith"	March 20, 1991	24.9
90	24	Wanted: Pat Fagan/Missing: Brandon Fagan. Update: "Wanted: Dennis DePue". Wanted: Dr. Kenneth Frank (repeat from October 3, 1990). Missing: Dan Wilson (repeat from October 3, 1990)	March 27, 1991	26.7
91	25	Wanted: Richard Bocklage. Missing: Lt. Paul Whipkey. Lost loves: Gary Bickford. Wanted: Astarte Davis/Murder: Jim Rice. Update: "Wanted: Edward Maynard". Update: "Wanted: Pat Fagan/Missing: Brandon Fagan"	April 3, 1991	22.0
92	26	Wanted: Rafael Camarena. Lost loves: Duncan Gilmore. Wanted: Gregory Barker. Lost loves: Parents of Jeri Graves. Update: "Wanted: Dennis DePue"	April 24, 1991	23.0
93	27	Wanted: Pizza Parlor Killer. Wanted: The Countess. Murder: Bobbi Oberholtzer and Annette Schnee. Lost loves: The Sisters of Jackie Dragon. Update: "Mystery: KROQ Confession/Murder: Angela Cummings". Update: "Wanted: Gregory Barker"	May 1, 1991	23.6
94	28	Mystery: Ryan Stallings. Legend: The Disappearance of Amelia Earhart (repeat from October 3, 1990). Wanted: Minnesota Brinks Heist (repeat from October 3, 1990)	May 8, 1991	23.5
95	29	Wanted: Tony Alamo. Murder: Lester Garnier. Mystery: Katie (repeat from October 31, 1990). Wanted: Richard Church/Murder: Raymond and Ruth Ann Ritter (repeat from November 7, 1990)	May 15, 1991	16.3
96	30	Wanted: James Donald King. Murder: Norman Ladner (repeat from November 21, 1990). Murder: Mark Groezinger (repeat from January 24, 1990). Legend: Loretto Chapel (repeat from November 21, 1990)	May 22, 1991	19.8
97	31	Lost loves: Melvin and Daniel Nellis. Missing: Michael Rosenblum (repeat from January 11, 1989). Mystery: New York Coin Scam (repeat from October 11, 1989)	August 28, 1991	17.8
98	32	Wanted: Lesa Lee. Update: "Wanted: Louis Carlucci". Update: "Wanted: Tony Alamo"	September 4, 1991	19.4
99	33	Update: "Legend: Bermuda Triangle". Update: "Wanted: Dark Dante". Mystery: Ryan Stallings (repeat from May 8, 1991). Wanted: Pat Fagan/Missing: Brandon Fagan (repeat from March 27, 1991)	September 11, 1991	19.9

=== Season 4 (1991–92) ===
No. overall	No. in season	Mystery	Original release date	U.S. viewers (millions)
100	1	The Unexplained: Rendlesham Forest Incident. Murder: Shane Stewart and Sally McNelly. Lost loves: The Mother of Carla Downing	September 18, 1991	23.9
101	2	Mystery: John Wilkes Booth. Wanted: Art Silva. Missing: Alex Cooper. Update: "Wanted: Melody Martin/Missing: Paloma Gibson"	September 25, 1991	23.7
102	3	Mystery: Tyler. Wanted: Joe Maloney. Legend: The Shroud of Turin. Murder: Ethel Kidd. Update: "Wanted: Art Silva"	October 2, 1991	22.1
103	4	Wanted: Connecticut River Valley Killer. Wanted: Judge John Fairbanks. Lost loves: Paul and Paula Scribner. Update: "Lost loves: Duncan Gilmore". Update: "Mystery: Tyler"	October 9, 1991	22.7
104	5	Missing: Baron 52. Wanted: David O'Neil. Wanted: Paul Stamper. Wanted: Josephine White. Update: "Lost loves: Martha Hinkle"	October 16, 1991	23.1
105	6	Missing: Tommy Gibson. Wanted: Jim Burnside. Lost loves: John Novotny. Murder: Gary Gibson. Update: "Mystery: Tyler"	October 23, 1991	24.5
106	7	Legend: The Ghosts of the St. James Hotel. Legend: The Ghost of Harden House. Missing: Mary Ann Perez. Wanted: Dr. John Anderson	October 30, 1991	26.8
107	8	Mystery: James Fox; Elliott Leyton; Reid Maloy. Wanted: Marie Hilley. Mystery: G. Daniel Walker. Murder: Joan, Michelle and Christe Rogers	November 3, 1991	17.3
108	9	Mystery: Sharon Johnson. Murder: Roger Dean. Wanted: Liza Montgomery. Missing: Deborah Poe and Donna Callahan/Murder: Darlene Messer. Missing: Arthur Jones. Update: "Wanted: Joe Smith"	November 6, 1991	26.9
109	10	Mystery: John Catchings Missing: Sherry Eyerly. Murder: Kathy Bonderson. Mystery: Sarah DiGennaro. Mystery: The Mad Butcher of Kingsbury Run (repeat from February 20, 1991)	November 10, 1991	16.9
110	11	Wanted: Televangelist Bomber. Lost loves: Savior of Cathy Loving. Murder: Beverly McGowan. Wanted: Robin Stevens and Sherry Seymour. Update: "Mystery: Ryan Stallings"	November 13, 1991	25.9
111	12	Legend: Belgium UFO. Murder: Robert Hamrick. Wanted: Philip Breen. Lost loves: Ellie Taylor, Patrick Ackles and Fred Gardner. Update: "Lost loves: The Mother of Carla Downing"	November 20, 1991	25.8
112	13	Murder: Jeffrey Digman. Wanted: Bo Tanner. Lost loves: The Mother of Barbara Smith and Barbara Ratner. Wanted: Church Arsonist. Legend: Trabuco Treasure. Update: "Wanted: Paul Stamper". Murder: Teresita Basa (repeat from April 25, 1990)	November 27, 1991	25.2
113	14	Wanted: Michael St. Clair and Dennis Reese. Mystery: Dan Tondevold. Lost loves: Annie Ellen Currie. Missing: Joey Moss/Wanted: Jerry Moss. Update: "Lost loves: Melvin and Daniel Nellis". Update: "Wanted: Robin Stevens and Sherry Seymour"	December 4, 1991	27.8
114	15	Murder: Chad Maurer. Lost heirs: Lorene Roberts. Wanted: Emma Figueroa. Wanted: Luis Herrera, Pedro Pumajero, Jose Rubio, Eduwigis Escalante, and Juan Carlos Pereira. Lost loves: Heath Brian Vess. Update: "Lost loves: John Novotny"	December 11, 1991	26.8
115	16	Mystery: Larry Race. Wanted: Warner Child Killer/Murder: Warner Jane Doe. Wanted: Pat Farmer/Missing: Jared Peters. Lost loves: Helen Rose. Update: "Wanted: Jim Burnside"	December 18, 1991	26.0
116	17	Wanted: Philip Fraser. Missing: Billy Joe Neesmith, Keith Wilkes and Franklin Brantley (the crew of the Casie Nicole). Lost loves: The child of W. B. "Mac" McDonald. Wanted: William John Wood	January 15, 1992	28.8
117	18	Lost loves: Madeline and Ada Underwood. Wanted: Todd Mueller. Wanted: Connecticut River Valley Killer (repeat from October 9, 1991). Murder: Kathy Bonderson (repeat from November 10, 1991)	January 29, 1992	26.4
118	19	Legend: Medjugorje Miracles. Wanted: Levia Koropolous/Missing: Nicholas Koropolous. Missing: Angela Hammond. Missing: Lee Young	February 5, 1992	28.3
119	20	Lost loves: Daughter of John Elias and Eleanor Platt. Wanted: James White. Legend: The Yeti. Mystery: Stanton Bones. Update: "Wanted: Robin Stevens and Sherry Seymour"	February 12, 1992	24.2
120	24	Mystery: Wytheville UFO Sightings. Wanted: Charles Warren Boomer aka The Satchel Bandit. Wanted: Ohio prostitute killer. Legend: Beaty Castle. Update: "Missing: Joey Moss". Update: "Wanted: Dale Hyde". Update: "Wanted: John Irwin". Update: "Wanted: Gregory Barker". Mystery: Robert Kennedy Assassination (repeat from May 16, 1990)	February 19, 1992	25.1
121	22	Wanted: Valley Bank Robbery. Lost loves: Angeline Dewey. Wanted: Cheryl Holland. Update: "Lost loves: Heath Brian Vess"	February 26, 1992	27.0
122	23	Wanted: Pizza Restaurant Robbers. Lost loves: James Russell, Darlene and Davida Ebmeier, Thomas Manion, Steve Madding, Rita Madding, and Pamela Madding. Update: "Wanted: Paul Stamper". Update: "Lost loves: The Child of W. B. "Mac" McDonald". Missing: Baron 52 (repeat from October 16, 1991). Wanted: Josephine White (repeat from October 16, 1991)	March 4, 1992	24.0
123	24	Wanted: Richard Minns. Lost heirs: Heirs of Katherine Bennett. Wanted: Sergio Farina/Missing: Marcus Farina. Update: "Missing: Alex Cooper"	March 18, 1992	27.8
124	25	Mystery: Santos Family. Missing: Thomas Gibson (repeat from October 23, 1991). Update: "Wanted: Jim Burnside" (repeat from October 23, 1991). Update: "Lost loves: John Novotny" (repeat from October 23, 1991)	April 1, 1992	25.9
125	26	Murder: Marie Lilienberg and Maria Wahlen. Lost loves: The Family of Joe Soll. Wanted: Tom Dixon/Murder: Gary Simmons. Wanted: Richard Condia. Update: "Mystery: The Disappearance of Amelia Earhart". Update: "Lost loves: The Sisters of Jackie Dragon"	April 8, 1992	24.4
126	27	Murder: Jeanne Tovrea. Wanted: Judge John Fairbanks (repeat from October 9, 1991). Mystery: Sherry Eyerly and John Catchings (repeat from November 10, 1991). Mystery: Sarah DiGennaro (repeat from November 10, 1991)	April 15, 1992	21.4
127	28	Murder: Vallejo Armored Car Murders. Update: "Wanted: Liza Montgomery". Murder: Roger Dean (repeat from November 6, 1991)	April 22, 1992	20.2
128	29	Legend: Noah's Ark. Murder: Tracy Wofford-Bunn. Lost loves: Dolores Stradt. Missing: Colleen Reed. Update: "Wanted: Levia Koropolous/Missing: Nicholas Koropolous"	April 29, 1992	21.4
129	30	Murder: Doug Johnston. Wanted: Rochester Car Heist. Lost loves: Robert Brown. Murder: Chaim Weiss. Update: "Wanted: James White"	May 6, 1992	23.2
130	31	Wanted: Betty Field/Missing: Christophe Day. Update: "Wanted: Cheryl Holland". Wanted: Televangelist Bomber (repeat from November 13, 1991). Lost loves: Savior of Cathy Loving (repeat from November 13, 1991). Murder: Beverly McGowan (repeat from November 13, 1991)	May 13, 1992	21.3
131	32	Murder: Bill Henderson. Mystery: Wytheville UFO Sightings (repeat from February 19, 1992). Wanted: Charles Warren Boomer aka The Satchel Bandit (repeat from February 19, 1992). Mystery: Robert Kennedy Assassination (repeat from May 16, 1990)	May 17, 1992	15.3
132	33	Murder: Scott Johnson. Update: "Lost loves: The Friends of Charlie Best". Legend: Belgium UFO (repeat from November 20, 1991)	May 20, 1992	19.0
133	34	Lost loves: Michelle Fazzani. Wanted: Tom Dixon/Murder: Gary Simmons (repeat from April 8, 1992). Murder: Vallejo Armored Car Murders (repeat from April 22, 1992)	August 12, 1992	15.7
134	35	Missing: George Owens. Update: "Murder: Bill Henderson". Murder: Doug Johnston (repeat from May 6, 1992)	August 19, 1992	15.4
135	36	Lost loves: The Siblings of Jim Boumgarden	September 2, 1992	21.8
136	37	Wanted: Sal Guardado. Update: "Lost loves: Michelle Fazzani". Murder: Tracy Wofford-Bunn (repeat from April 29, 1992)	September 9, 1992	19.4

=== Season 5 (1992–93) ===
No. overall	No. in season	Mystery	Original release date	U.S. viewers (millions)
137	1	Missing: Tammy Lynn Leppert. Legend: Hudson River UFO. Mystery: Paducah Plane Jumper. Mystery: Estelle	September 16, 1992	22.2
138	2	Wanted: Mahfuz Huq. Legend: Champ. Mystery: Pierre April. Wanted: Joseph Krantz/Missing: Martha Doe Roberts. Update: "Lost heirs: Lorene Roberts"	September 23, 1992	22.4
139	3	Wanted: Seattle Arsonist. Mystery: Huey Long. Lost loves: James Gilwreath	September 30, 1992	21.5
140	4	Wanted: David Gordon Smith. Missing: Clifford Sherwood. Murder: Ed Baker. Wanted: Phillip Anthony Moore. Update: "Lost loves: Paul and Paula Scribner"	October 7, 1992	21.3
141	5	Missing: Patricia Carlton. Murder: Lucie Turmel. Mystery: The Family of Georgia Boyd. Mystery: Little Miss Panasoffkee. Update: "Lost loves: James Gilwreath". Update: "Wanted: Charles Warren Boomer"	October 14, 1992	20.9
142	6	Mystery: Glen Loney, Rhonda Anderson and Catherine Webb. Wanted: New Orleans Serial Killer. Lost loves: The savior of James Vernon. Wanted: J. D. Method	October 21, 1992	21.3
143	7	Legend: The Ghosts at Moss Beach Distillery. Legend: The Ghosts at Drum Barracks Civil War Museum. Lost loves: The children of Ethel Nation. Mystery: Sandra Evans. Update: "Mystery: Pierre April"	October 28, 1992	23.9
144	8	The Unexplained: Falcon Lake UFO. Murder: Jesslyn Rich. Missing: Adam John "A. J." Breaux. Update: "Lost loves: Savior of Cathy Loving"	November 4, 1992	23.6
145	9	Missing: Charles Shelton. Murder: Rebecca Young. Wanted: Richard McNair. Update: "Wanted: Pat Farmer/Missing: Jared Peters"	November 11, 1992	23.2
146	10	Mystery: George Anderson. Murder: Jaclyn Dowaliby. Update: "Lost loves: James Gilwreath"	November 18, 1992	17.4
147	11	Wanted: Robert Watson. Lost loves: Cathy Marie Ferner. Wanted: William Korioth/Missing: Windy Korioth. Lost loves: Becky Terry. Lost loves: Kimberly, Katie and Kelly Hurley. Lost loves: Connie Jo Hamilton. Missing: John Harman/Wanted: Tracy Davis. Wanted: Michael Hansen/Missing: Cozette Hansen. Wanted: Susan Roberts/Missing: Aaron and Ronald Roberts. Wanted: Elizabeth Ortiz/Missing: Jonathan Ortiz. Wanted: Joseph Arthur Rodia. Wanted: Kenneth E. Dickerson. Update: "Lost loves: Michelle Fazzani". Update: "Wanted: Phillip Anthony Moore"	November 25, 1992	17.7
148	12	Murder: Eva Shoen. Lost loves: Kathleen Mary Young. Wanted: Edward Bell. Missing: Pamela June Ray. Update: "Wanted: William Korioth/Missing: Windy Korioth". Update: "Lost loves: Becky Terry"	December 2, 1992	24.6
149	13	Murder: The Black Dahlia. Lost loves: Eric and Keith Nickerson. Legend: Hotel Bullock. Missing: Alexander Olive	December 9, 1992	20.5
150	14	Mystery: Luis Diaz/Wanted: The Bird Road Rapist. Missing: Anthonette Cayedito. Lost loves: The Family of Charles Stubin. Wanted: Michael Anthony Starr	December 16, 1992	21.7
151	15	Mystery: Chucky McGivern. Lost loves: The Parents of Alexandra Stantzos. Lost loves: The Friend of Russell and Jean Johnson. Lost loves: Mickey Allen Samson, Fu Teed Wong, The Children of Uta Collins. Update: "Lost loves: James Russell, Darlene and Davida Ebmeier, Thomas Manion, Steve Madding, Rita Madding, and Pamela Madding"	December 23, 1992	20.9
152	16	Mystery: Rick McCue/Murder: Alene Courchesne. Legend: Champ (repeat from September 23, 1992). Wanted: Mahfuz Huq (repeat from September 23, 1992)	January 6, 1993	24.3
153	17	Wanted: Bill Roberts/Murder: Neal Jennings. Wanted: Sal Guardado (repeat from September 9, 1992). Missing: Patricia Carlton (repeat from October 14, 1992). Murder: Little Miss Panasoffkee (repeat from October 14, 1992)	January 20, 1993	21.6
154	18	Legend: Yamashita's Treasure. Murder: Kait Arquette. Lost loves: Terry Lynn Smith	January 27, 1993	N/A
155	19	Legend: Guardian UFO. Mystery: Lucy. Wanted: Larry George. Lost loves: The Siblings of Eugene Price. Update: "Lost loves: Eric and Keith Nickerson"	February 3, 1993	25.0
156	20	Murder: Jeanine Nicarico. Lost loves: Bernie and Calvin Seaton. Lost loves: The Siblings of Jim Boumgarden (repeat from September 2, 1992). Update: "Lost loves: Connie Jo Hamilton"	February 9, 1993	12.8
157	21	Mystery: Don Decker. Murder: Michael Hunter. Lost loves: Dolores Ford. Mystery: Tom Hughes. Update: "Lost loves: The Siblings of Eugene Price"	February 10, 1993	18.4
158	22	Mystery: Bashir Kouchaji. Wanted: Sharon Rogers' Car Bomber. Lost loves: Savior of Phillip Macri. Update: "Missing: Martha Doe Roberts". Update: "Lost loves: The Children of Ethel Nation"	February 17, 1993	16.0
159	23	Murder: Chad Langford. Lost heirs: Scott Hill. Mystery: Gabby's Bones. Update: "Mystery: Tony Miller"	February 24, 1993	21.8
160	24	Murder: Danny Casolaro. Lost loves: Margaret Wiesner. Wanted: Blind River Killer/Murder: Jacqueline McAllister and Brian Major. Murder: Susan Hamwi/Mystery: John Gordon Purvis	March 10, 1993	21.0
161	25	Murder: Mario Amado. Legend: Falcon Lake UFO (repeat from November 4, 1992). Update: "Lost loves: Savior of Cathy Loving" (repeat from November 4, 1992). Missing: Adam John "A. J." Breaux (repeat from November 4, 1992)	March 17, 1993	21.8
162	26	Mystery: Martin Luther King Jr. Wanted: J. D. Method (repeat from October 21, 1992). Wanted: New Orleans Serial Killer (repeat from October 21, 1992)	March 31, 1993	18.5
163	27	Legend: Image of Guadalupe. Wanted: Stahl Painting Theft. Murder: Tom Roche. Murder: David Hurley/Wanted: Route 22 Killer. Update: "Lost loves: Bernie and Calvin Seaton"	April 7, 1993	18.7
164	28	Wanted: Julius Patterson and Paulette Hite. Wanted: Ramzi Yousef. Update: "Wanted: Edward Bell". Murder: Eva Shoen (repeat from December 2, 1992). Lost loves: Duncan Gilmore (repeat from April 24, 1991)	April 21, 1993	20.7
165	29	Missing: Dede Rosenthal. Update: "Wanted: Chief Greg Webb". Mystery: George Anderson (repeat from November 18, 1992). Wanted: Bill Roberts/Murder: Neal Jennings (repeat from January 20, 1993)	April 28, 1993	18.0
166	30	Mystery: Gander Plane Crash. Lost loves: Arthur Lloyd. Wanted: Nelson DeCloud. Update: "Lost loves: Becky Terry"	May 5, 1993	17.1
167	31	Murder: Eileen Mangold. Update: "Wanted: David Gordon Smith". Lost loves: Eric and Keith Nickerson (repeat from December 9, 1992). Legend: Hotel Bullock (repeat from December 9, 1992). Missing: Alexander Olive (repeat from December 9, 1992)	May 12, 1993	16.1
168	32	Mystery: Tina Resch. Wanted: Milk Carton Bandit and Grandpa Bandit. Lost loves: The parents of Miriam. Mystery: The Crew of the L-8. Wanted: Reggie DePalma. Mystery: Michael Lloyd Self/Murder: Rhonda Johnson and Sharon Shaw. Update: "Mystery: Rick McCue/Murder: Alene Courchesne"	May 19, 1993	17.0
169	33	Wanted: Lyle Moody. Update: "Lost loves: Savior of Phillip Macri". Legend: Yamashita's Treasure (repeat from January 27, 1993)	May 26, 1993	14.8
170	34	Wanted: Brian Brophil. Update: "Murder: Jaclyn Dowaliby"	August 25, 1993	17.5
171	35	Missing: Gordon Collins. Lost loves: Kathleen Mary Young (repeat from December 2, 1992). Wanted: Edward Bell (repeat from December 2, 1992). Mystery: Pierre April (repeat from September 23, 1992)	September 15, 1993	16.7

=== Season 6 (1993–94) ===
No. overall	No. in season	Mystery	Original release date	U.S. viewers (millions)
172	1	The unexplained: Bruce Kelly and James Edward Johnston. Wanted: Gerardo González "Cachimba". Murder: Jacquelyn Tendall; Gail Jordan and Dawn Lamont. Lost loves: Joan Gay Croft. Update: "Wanted: Nelson DeCloud"	September 22, 1993	18.0
173	2	Robbery: Jose Gonzalez/Wanted: Brenda Penniger and Nadine Castelle. The unexplained: Frederick Valentich. Unexplained death: Danny Williams. Update: "Lost heirs: Scott Hill"	September 29, 1993	15.2
174	3	Mystery: Anna Anderson. Wanted: Andolina Gonzalez. Wanted: Jerry Gervasoni	October 6, 1993	19.1
175	4	Murder: Dr. Theodore Loseff. Mystery: Wally Spencer. Lost loves: Christopher Kurowski. Update: "Murder: Lee Selwyn"	October 13, 1993	20.1
176	5	Wanted: Joseph Prushinowski. Missing: Wendy Camp, Cynthia Britto, and Lisa Kregear. Lost loves: Madeline Strauss. Wanted: Su-Ya Kim's killer	October 20, 1993	16.8
177	6	The unexplained: The Ghosts of the Mann House. Wanted: Rohrey Wychgel's attacker. Unexplained death: Lisa Ziegert. Lost loves: Eve Meisel. Update: "Lost loves: Kathleen Mary Young". Update: "Robbery: Jose Gonzalez"	October 27, 1993	17.8
178	7	Legends: The Fatima Miracle. Wanted: Wade Mitchell Parker. Wanted: David Leigh MacLeod. Wanted: Michael Benka, Robert Fritch and Donald Alexander. Update: "Lost loves: Jim Burke". Update: "Wanted: Jerry Gervasoni"	November 3, 1993	22.2
179	8	Unexplained death: Jill and Julie Hansen. Wanted: John Grundhofer's kidnapper. Lost loves: Michael Seymour	November 10, 1993	18.0
180	9	Mystery: The Mona Lisa. Wanted: Raymond Young. Wanted: Travis Wade Duncan. Missing: Doreen Marfeo. Update: "Wanted: Julius Patterson and Paulette Hite"	November 17, 1993	20.1
181	10	Unexplained death: Corrine Gustavson/Wanted: Edmonton Rapist. Murder: Larry Costine/Missing: Melissa Jo Sermons. Wanted: Danny Marino/Al Tom and Ricky Nelson. Lost loves: Dorothy Johnson. Update: "Wanted: Robert Watson"	November 24, 1993	18.7
182	11	Murder: Gary Grant Jr. Wanted: Lissette Nukida. Lost loves: Saviors of Colleen Frangione. Lost loves: Sandy Breed and Bruce Clark	December 1, 1993	17.6
183	12	Missing: Pam Page. Update: "Lost loves: Saviors of Colleen Frangione". Mystery: Bruce Kelly (repeat from September 22, 1993). Lost: Joan Gay Croft (repeat from September 22, 1993)	December 8, 1993	18.6
184	13	Lost loves: The Children of Hilda Craun. Wanted: Gerardo González "Cachimba" (repeat from September 22, 1993). Mystery: Anna Anderson (repeat from October 6, 1993)	December 22, 1993	15.7
185	14	Murder: Jay Given. Mystery: Daly City Man. Lost loves: Brendan Vaughan. Missing: Shafaa Salem/Wanted: DeFallah Al-Salem. Update: "Murder: Eva Shoen"	January 5, 1994	20.2
186	15	Missing: Charles Horvath. Wanted: Danny Pineda. Lost Loves: The Children of Faith Brown. Wanted: Armando Garcia. Update: "Wanted: The Countess"	January 12, 1994	17.4
187	16	Wanted: Grocery Robbers. Lost loves: Christopher Kurowski (repeat from October 13, 1993). Update: "Murder: Lee Selwyn"	January 19, 1994	21.2
188	17	Missing: Amy Billig. Lost heirs: Heirs of Walter Rice. Missing: Oliver Munson. Lost loves: Rose Marie Luttmer. Update: "Lost loves: Dorothy Johnson"	January 26, 1994	16.7
189	18	Legend: San Pedro Mummy. Murder: Andre Jones. Lost loves: The Family of Terris Christie Derby. Wanted: "Wadada". Update: "Wanted: Jerry Gervasoni"	February 2, 1994	20.9
190	19	Legend: Resurrection Cemetery. Missing: Selena Edon. Wanted: Victor Gerena and Filiberto Ojeda Ríos. Lost loves: Bruce Bradney. Lost loves: The Mother of Margaret Smith. Lost loves: Kimberly Karen Lofton. Update: "Lost loves: Saviors of Colleen Frangione"	February 9, 1994	21.2
191	20	Murder: Dick Hansen. Lost loves: Vernicy Bradford. Legend: Healing Waters of Lourdes. Wanted: Joseph Collins. Update: "Wanted: Brian Brophil"	February 16, 1994	14.9
192	21	Murder: Michael Carmichael and Billy Ray Hargrove. Wanted: David MacLeod (repeat from November 3, 1993). Mystery: Wally Spencer (repeat from October 13, 1993). Lost: Eve Meisel (repeat from October 27, 1993)	February 23, 1994	10.2
193	22	Mystery: Nova and Lady. Legend: Interceptors. Murder: Dave Bocks. Update: "Wanted: Manwell Marino"	March 2, 1994	18.4
194	23	Murder: Tony Lombardi. Update: "Lost loves: The Children of Faith Brown". Wanted: Travis Wade Duncan (repeat from November 17, 1993). Lost loves: The Siblings of Eugene Price (repeat from February 3, 1993)	March 16, 1994	16.7
195	24	Mystery: Carolyn Herbert, Elaine Emmi, and Linda Babb. Murder: Anita Green. Wanted: Filemon Santiago and Gary Miller. Lost heirs: Heirs of Charles Lazarus. Wanted: Dr. Arvind Sinha	March 23, 1994	15.3
196	25	Missing: Hugh Harlin/Murder: Dian Harlin. Update: "Lost loves: Michael Seymour". Wanted: Lissette Nukida (repeat from December 1, 1993). Update: Wanted: Robert Watson (repeat from November 24, 1993). Wanted: Joseph Prushinowski (repeat from October 20, 1993)	April 6, 1994	16.6
197	26	Mystery: Therapeutic touch. Wanted: Pennsylvania Bank Robber. Bank Robber Roll Call: Wanted: Deroy King, Jr/Tampa Bay Robber/Miami Robber/Southern California Robber. Wanted: David Viera. Lost loves: Jim Pearson	April 13, 1994	15.5
198	27	Missing: John Cheek. Update: "Wanted: David Viera". Update: "Lost loves: Kimberly Karen Lofton". Unexplained death: Jill and Julie Hansen (repeat from November 10, 1993). Lost loves: Madeline Strauss (repeat from October 20, 1993)	April 20, 1994	15.8
199	28	Legend: Treasure of Dutch Schultz. Murder: Roxann and Kristopher Jeeves. Missing: Lauren Jackson. Wanted: Tom Johnson. Update: "Mystery: Daly City Man"	April 27, 1994	15.1
200	29	Mystery: John and Patti Eggleston/Paige Roark. Wanted: Interstate 70 Killer. Update: "Lost loves: Brendan Vaughan". Wanted: Kelly Finnegan. Lost loves: The Father of Kathleen Belcher. Mystery: East Stockton John Doe	May 4, 1994	13.2
201	30	Mystery: Albert DeSalvo aka The Boston Strangler. Murder: Kevin Wheel. Lost loves: The Daughter of Oscar Norton	May 11, 1994	12.1
202	31	Legend: Bigfoot in the Northwest. Mystery: Bill and Dorothy Wacker. Missing: Craig Williamson. Murder: Jordan Children. Legend: Angels. Lost loves: Marilyn Hahnlein. Murder: Charlie Anderson. Lost loves: The Parents of Brenda Abbey. FBI Alerts: Joseph Gardner/Floyd Travers/Heather Tallchief and Roberto Solis/Ora Prince. Update: "Wanted: David Viera"	May 25, 1994	18.2
203	32	Update: "Legend: The Shroud of Turin". Missing: Yves-Emmanuel Pain and Laurent Hernas	September 7, 1994	11.8
204	33	Mystery: The Allagash Abductions. Legend: The Kazakhstan UFO. Update: "Legend: Roswell Crash and Area 51"	September 18, 1994	16.4

=== Season 7 (1994–95) ===
No. overall	No. in season	Mystery	Original release date	U.S. viewers (millions)
205	1	Legend: The Ice Man. Murder: Frank Olson. Update: "Wanted: Larry George"	September 25, 1994	11.6
206	2	Wanted: John Roubas. Murder: Jonathan Francia/Mystery: Jeanne Boylan. Legend: La Posada Hotel. Legend: Elysian Park Treasure	October 2, 1994	12.0
207	3	Mystery: Father Solanus Casey. Update: "Lost loves: The Children of Hilda Craun". Lost loves: Savior of Siegfried Laier. Legend: John Wilkes Booth (repeat from September 25, 1991)	October 9, 1994	11.3
208	4	Mystery: Adoptee Connections: Betty Landers/Lori Smith/The Mother of Elizabeth Bersanetti. Wanted: Adam Emery. Wanted: Phyllis Strub. Updates: "Wanted: Travis Wade Duncan". Fugitive Hotline: Wanted: Alan Verl Sneed/Edward Zakrzewski/Nasario Palacios	October 14, 1994	11.9
209	5	Mystery: Dannion Brinkley. Mystery: Karen Walker. Legend: Wyrick House	October 21, 1994	12.7
210	6	Legend: Mexico City UFO. Murder: Sammy Wheeler. Missing: Gordon Page Jr.	October 28, 1994	11.0
211	7	Mystery/Wanted: Circleville Writer/Murder: Ron Gillispie. Mystery: Agatha Christie. Murder: Tommy Burkett. Legend: Poverty Island Treasure. Wanted: Tim Barry. Update: "Lost loves: Jim Pearson"	November 11, 1994	13.1
212	8	Mystery: Nancy Myer/Murder: Jennifer Odom. Legend: Mary Celeste. Lost loves: Saviors of Michele West. Update: "Lost loves: The Parents of Brenda Abbey"	December 2, 1994	11.2
213	9	Wanted: Neil and Terry Gott. Mystery: Frank and Teresa Wilson. Missing: Robert "Curt" Borton. Murder: Roy Caffey	December 9, 1994	13.0
214	10	Mystery: Stuart Heaton. Legend: Gurdon Light. Mystery: Jay Durham. Update: "Lost loves: Marilyn Hahnlein"	December 16, 1994	12.9
215	11	Mystery: Teryn Hedlund. Lost: Philip Palatire (repeat from December 21, 1988). Mystery: Father Solanus Casey (repeat from October 9, 1994). Holiday-themed segment	December 23, 1994	12.3
216	12	Murder: Jack Davis Jr. Lost loves: Phillip Thomas. Mystery: Hank Jones, Dr. David Faux, and Carol Montrose. Wanted: Elwyn Jones. Wanted: Manny Moreno	January 6, 1995	15.6
217	13	Murder: Michael O'Mara. Missing: John and Linda Sohus. Lost loves: David, Norma, and Ernest Stallings. Fugitive Hotline: Wanted: Tyrom Theis, Shannon Smith. Legend: Phantom Sub. Update: "Lost loves: The Family of Terris Christie Derby"	January 13, 1995	13.2
218	14	Legend: Padre Pio. Murder: Kimberly Pandelios. Lost loves: Sylvan Lazarus, Carl Cobb, and Bernard Brady. Coroners investigating Jane and John Does. Mystery: Sumter County Does, found murdered in 1976. Mystery: 1987 Jane Doe, body found off a cliff. Mystery: 1990 Jane Doe, hit by a car. Update: "Lost loves: David, Norma, and Ernest Stallings". Update: "Wanted: Elwyn Jones"	January 20, 1995	14.6
219	15	Murder: Melanie Uribe/Mystery: Etta Smith. Mystery: James Van Praagh. Mystery: Jeanine Price	February 3, 1995	13.7
220	16	Wanted: Kansas City Arsonist. Wanted: Wallace Thrasher. Lost loves: Robert James Palmer. Missing: Loretta Myers	February 10, 1995	14.2
221	17	Missing: Kristi Krebs. Lost loves: The Search of Helen Elas. Wanted: Rita Faulkner. Wanted: Dub Wackerhagen/Missing: Chance Wackerhagen/Murder: Latricia White	February 17, 1995	13.5
222	18	Legend: Alamo Treasure. Wanted: Randall Utterback. Murder: Eric and Pam Ellender. Update: "Lost loves: Rose Marie Ledbetter"	February 24, 1995	13.1
223	19	Update: "Legend: Alamo Treasure". Murder: Jian Fang. Legend: The Ice Man (repeat from September 25, 1994). Murder: Frank Olson (repeat from September 25, 1994)	March 3, 1995	12.6
224	20	Wanted: Randolph Dial/Missing: Bobbi Parker. Recap: Wanted: Robert Watson. Recap: Wanted: David Fisher. Recap: Wanted: Jean Marie Gagnon. Recap: Wanted: Michael Mohon. Recap: Wanted: Edgar Kerns. Recap: Wanted: John Yount. Recap: Wanted: Travis Wade Duncan. Wanted: Frank Morris and the Anglin Brothers (repeat from February 8, 1989)	March 17, 1995	13.4
225	21	Mystery: Luiz Gasparetto. Missing: Tara Breckenridge. Lost loves: The Friends of Fritz Vincken. Wanted: Carlos Garcia. Update: "Wanted: Wade Mitchell Parker"	March 24, 1995	12.8
226	22	Wanted: James and Lisa Albert. Wanted: Elizabeth Ortiz (repeat from November 25, 1992). Wanted: Andolina Gonzalez (repeat from October 6, 1993). Wanted: Kelly Finnegan (repeat from May 4, 1994)	April 7, 1995	12.1
227	23	Mystery: Arnold Archambeau and Ruby Bruguier. Murder: Jennifer Odom/Mystery: Nancy Myer (repeat from December 2, 1994). Mystery: 1987 Jane Doe (repeat from January 20, 1995). Legend: Mexico City UFO (repeat from October 28, 1994)	April 14, 1995	11.4
228	24	Mystery: Noreen Renier/Murder: Jake and Dora Cohn/Murder:Rosemary Hom. Missing: Cecilia Newball and René Pérez Jr. Mystery: The Search of Bob Coleman. Wanted: Richard Ford	April 28, 1995	9.9
229	25	Mystery: Kathleen Burghardt and Eric Danowski. Wanted: Lionel Luviano. Mystery: Cognitech/Murder: Martin Ganz/Murder: Martin Hernandez. Missing: Keyan and Logan Ivey/Wanted: David Ivey. Missing: Davey Estright/Wanted: David Estright. Update: "Lost loves: David, Norma, and Ernest Stallings". Wanted: Father Solanus Casey (repeat from October 9, 1994)	May 5, 1995	9.3
230	26	Mystery: Patience Worth. Wanted: John Vogel. Missing: Justin Burgwinkel. Murder: Dorothy Donovan. Wanted: Paul Xavier Alexander	May 12, 1995	10.5
231	27	Mystery: E.L.F. Lost loves: Saviors of Dover Family. Wanted: Robert Arcieri. Missing: Breanna Smith and Ryan Heath. Investigation into postal crimes. Missing: Lisa Bishop and The Crew of the Freedon/Wanted: Florian Bourch (repeat from October 17, 1990)	May 19, 1995	10.4
232	28	Wanted: Rose Turford and Carolyn Stevens	August 18, 1995	9.4
233	29	Mystery: Gigi	August 23, 1995	10.2
234	30	Missing: Jean Moore. Wanted: Ray Olson	August 30, 1995	11.4

=== Season 8 (1995–96) ===
No. overall	No. in season	Mystery	Original release date	U.S. viewers (millions)
235	1	Mystery: Brandon Lee. Wanted: Dorothy Barnett/Missing: Savanna Todd. Wanted: Antonio Castro. Special Bulletin: Missing: Emilie Hardy/Wanted: Rejean Hardy. Special Bulletin: Wanted: Red Dye Robber. Mystery: Joe O'Brien. Update: "Mystery: Gigi". Update: "Wanted: Ray Olson"	October 20, 1995	15.4
236	2	Special Bulletin: Wanted: Ronald Earl Cains. Wanted: Brazos River Attackers. Wanted: Richard Relf/Missing: Heather Relf. Murder: Matt Flores. Mystery: Valley Hill Lights. Update: "Missing: Loretta Myers"	October 27, 1995	14.9
237	3	Wanted: Michael Swango. Special Bulletin: Missing: Renee Lamanna. Special Bulletin: Lost loves: The Daughter of Gerda Burian. Wanted: Michael Eschweiler. Mystery: Logan Carroll. Lost loves: Amadeo Marcelo. Update: "Wanted: Brazos River Attackers". Update: "Wanted: Manny Moreno"	November 3, 1995	15.0
238	4	Wanted: Guy Cummings. Special Bulletin: Case #1: Missing: Leonard Trigg/Wanted: Allie Ingrid Trigg. Special Bulletin: Case #2: Missing: Seth Arathorne/Wanted: Garth Arathorne. Missing: Charles Southern Jr./Mystery: Terri Hoffman. Murder: Alie Berrelez. Murder: Antranik Geuvjehizian a.k.a. "Deputy G-12". Update: "Lost loves: Amadeo Marcelo". Update: "Missing: Keyan and Logan Ivey/Wanted: David Ivey"	November 10, 1995	14.2
239	5	Missing: Philip Taylor Kramer. Lost loves: The Sister of Sherryl Borkowski. Mystery: Linda Tellington-Jones. Legend: Marie Laveau/Mystery: Harold Bennett. Missing: Tim Molnar. Update: "Missing: Craig Williamson"	November 17, 1995	13.6
240	6	Legend: Lonnie Zamora UFO Sighting. Wanted: Carl and Mary Dennie. Murder: David Merrifield. Missing: James Kimball. Lost loves: The Siblings of Debbie Hamilton. Special Bulletin: Case #1: Wanted: Ronald Bax. Special Bulletin: Case #2: Missing: Jessyca Mullenberg/Wanted: Steven Oliver. Update: "Lost loves: Saviors of Dover Family". Update: "Wanted: Garth Arathorne/Missing: Seth Arathorne"	December 1, 1995	14.0
241	7	Wanted: Roberto and Eladia Ramirez. Lost loves: The Siblings of Tina Shiets. Wanted: David Gause. Legend: Miracle the White Buffalo. Mystery: George Reeves. Update: "Murder: Kimberly Pandelios". Murder: Linda Sobek	December 8, 1995	13.4
242	8	Legend: Caddy. Wanted: Richard Bare. Lost: Michael Hughes/Mystery: Suzanne Davis. Wanted: Epes Bandits. Lost loves: The Family of Jeanne Martin. Special Bulletin: Case #1: Wanted: Rickey Bright. Special Bulletin: Case #2: Wanted: Michael McGuffey. Update: "Wanted: Rose Turford and Carolyn Stevens". Update: "Lost loves: The Siblings of Tina Shiets"	December 15, 1995	12.4
243	9	Murder: Tom Kueter/Missing: Tina Marcotte. Murder: Brian Foguth. Wanted: Nassau County Robber/Boynton Beach Robber. Wanted: Ira Einhorn. Legend: Ghosts at the Covewood Lodge. Update: "Wanted: Richard Ford/Matthew Crome"	January 5, 1996	14.5
244	10	Murder: Leroy Drieth. Lost loves: Donna Kempton. Missing: Bonnie Haim. Legend: The Devil's Backbone. Update: "Johnny Lee Wilson"	January 12, 1996	15.0
245	11	Wanted: Michael Eschweiler (repeat from November 10, 1995). Wanted: Michael Swango (repeat from November 3, 1995). Wanted: Ronald Bax (repeat from December 1, 1995). Missing: Jim Kimball (repeat from December 1, 1995)	January 19, 1996	14.4
246	12	Missing: Moses Lall and Lila Buerattan/Wanted: Hari Gobin. Legend: Marie Laveau (repeat from November 17, 1995). Missing: Philip Taylor Kramer (repeat from November 17, 1995). Lost loves: The Sister of Sheryl Borkowski (repeat from November 17, 1995). Missing: Tim Molnar (repeat from November 17, 1995)	January 31, 1996	14.8
247	13	Wanted: Thomas David Dixon. Mystery: Nancy Manni. Lost loves: The Mother of Michelle Neal-Arkin. Murder: Mia Zapata. Special Bulletin: Lost: Sandra Nevarez. Update: "Lost loves: The Daughter of Gerda Burian"	February 2, 1996	15.3
248	14	Legend: Jean Hilliard. Murder: Su Taraskiewicz. Wanted: Albert Leon Fletcher. Mystery: Jesse Presley. Special Bulletin: Wanted: Kevin Dominic. Update: "Wanted: Richard Ford". Update: "Lost loves: The Mother of Michelle Neal-Arkin"	February 9, 1996	15.6
249	15	Wanted: Green River Killer. Murder: Martha Moxley. Lost loves: Rodger Lindsley. Mystery: Michelle O'Malley	February 16, 1996	13.3
250	16	Missing: Jodi Huisentruit. Mystery: Philip Pauli. Legend: Lonnie Zamora UFO Sighting (repeat from December 1, 1995). Wanted: Carl and Mary Dennie (repeat from December 1, 1995). Murder: David Merrifield (repeat from December 1, 1995)	February 18, 1996	9.0
251	17	Legend: The Ghosts of the Comedy Store. Lost loves: Savior of Wendy Radcliffe. Wanted: Bike Path Rapist. Murder: Keith Warren. Update: "Lost loves: The Friends of Fritz Vincken"	February 23, 1996	14.1
252	18	Special Bulletin: Wanted: Michael McGuffey (repeat from December 15, 1995). Lost loves: The Family of Jeanne Martin (repeat from December 15, 1995). Wanted: Richard Bare/Murder: Sherry Hart (repeat from December 15, 1995). Missing: Michael Hughes/Mystery: Suzanne Davis (repeat from December 15, 1995)	March 8, 1996	11.2
253	19	Wanted: Richard Cepulonis/Missing: Karen Walters. Legend: The Ghosts of Gettysburg National Military Park. Missing: Devin Williams. Murder: Michael Johnston and Rochelle Robinson. Special Bulletin: Wanted: John Anthony Diaz. Update: "Lost loves: Saviors of Wendy Radcliffe". Update: "Wanted: Michael Eschweiler"	March 15, 1996	15.6
254	20	Lost loves: Saviors of Duane Miller. Wanted: Sam Wodke. Mystery: Vince Foster. Murder: Jean Ellroy. Update: "Lost loves: The Mother of Michelle Neal-Arkin"	March 22, 1996	14.6
255	21	Murder: David Cox. Miracle: Mary Clamser. Wanted: Inner City Church Fire. Lost loves: The Family of LaDonna Alfano. Special Bulletin: Wanted: Antonio Moses. Update: "Wanted: Thomas David Dixon"	March 29, 1996	13.4
256	22	Special Bulletin: Wanted: Ernest Small. Wanted: Roberto and Eladia Ramirez (repeat from December 8, 1995). Missing: Moses Lall and Lila Buerattan (repeat from January 31, 1996). Murder: Linda Sobek (repeat from October 27, 1995). Mystery: George Reeves (repeat from December 8, 1995)	April 5, 1996	11.9
257	23	Murder: Joan Jefferies. Mystery: The Wickenburg Massacre. Mystery: Tony Marabella. Wanted: Luis Ochoa. Special Bulletin: Murder: Tanya Smith. Update: "Lost loves: The Family of LaDonna Alfano"	April 12, 1996	12.1
258	24	Wanted: Gloria Schulze. Legend: Nazca Lines. Missing: Charlotte Pollis. Legend: The Ghosts at the Three Partners Ranch. Special Bulletin: Wanted: John Addis/Missing: Joann Albanese. Update: "Wanted: Antonio Moses". Update: "Wanted: The Unabomber"	April 19, 1996	10.7
259	25	Mystery: Doris Duke. Lost loves: The friends of Kim Schad (Ngoc and Yanching). Legend: Chupacabra. Mystery: Matt and Wendy Jameson. Update: "Lost loves: Rodger Lindsley". Update: "Wanted: John Anthony Diaz"	April 26, 1996	11.1
260	26	Mystery: Scott Enyart. Mystery: Robert Davidson. Wanted: Timothy Coombs. Murder: Shelly Malone	May 3, 1996	11.2
261	27	Legend: The Curse of King Tut. Mystery: Harvey McCloud. Mystery: Sarah Powell. Murder: Amtrak Derailment. Update: "Wanted: Sam Wodke"	May 10, 1996	10.4
262	28	Murder: Joseph Cole. Lost loves: The Mother of Tim Harrell. Wanted: David Freeman/Murder: Tim Good. Mystery: Milly McGregor and Randy Spears. Special Bulletin: Lost: Candice and Sharina Berry. Update: "Lost loves: The Family of LaDonna Alfano". Update: "Wanted: Thomas David Dixon"	May 17, 1996	10.7
263	29	Wanted: Jorge Mendez and Jose Rios/Murder: Kristie Martin. Murder: David Cox (repeat from March 29, 1996). Wanted: Thomas David Dixon (repeat from March 29, 1996). Mystery: Inner City Church Fire (repeat from March 29, 1996)	September 6, 1996	7.6
264	30	Wanted: Kelly Lee McGinnis. Murder: Kristie Gunderson Lee. Lost loves: The Daughter of Dave and Christie Carlsen. Legend: The Curse of King Tut (repeat from May 10, 1996)	September 13, 1996	10.4

=== Season 9 (1996–97) ===
No. overall	No. in season	Mystery	Original release date	U.S. viewers (millions)
265	1	Wanted: The Zodiac Killer and the similarities to the Unabomber. Missing: April Gregory. Missing: Kristin Smart. Mystery: Trish Zemba. Wanted: William Jordan. Special Bulletin: Wanted: Andre Wilson. Update: "Wanted: Carl and Mary Dennie"	September 20, 1996	11.9
266	2	Mystery: Margaux Hemingway. Wanted: Jonathan Kern. Murder: Michele Cartagena and Grant Hendrickson. Mystery: Kevin Reeder/Lost loves: Bruce and Rosa. Special Bulletin: Lost: Raymond Routte. Special Bulletin: Wanted: Jose Blandon. Update: "Wanted: Albert Leon Fletcher". Update: "Lost loves: The Daughter of Dave and Christie Carlsen"	September 27, 1996	13.0
267	3	Murder: Bobby Fuller. Mystery: Red mercury. Mystery: Cawood Burglary. Legend: Fertility Statues. Special Bulletin: Wanted: David Coleman. Special Bulletin: Mystery: Jason Doe. Update: "Wanted: Kelly Lee McGinnis". Update: "Wanted: David Freeman/Murder: Tim Good"	October 18, 1996	10.7
268	4	Mystery: Laurie Cabot/Missing: Gail Knowlton. Legend: Sam Zelikson. Wanted: Yessica Mendez a.k.a Elena Souza. Wanted: Agustin Mendoza. Special Bulletin: Missing: Meriah and Sabria Widboom. Update: "Lost loves: The Mother of Tim Harrell"	October 25, 1996	11.1
269	5	Legend: Life on Mars. Wanted: Tony DeCompo. Murder: David Chase. Special Bulletin: Case #1: Lost heirs: Owen Walker. Special Bulletin: Case #2: Lost heirs: Temperee Hawkins. Update: "Wanted: Kansas City Arsonist". Update: "Wanted: David Coleman". Update: "Lost: Candice and Sharina Berry". Update: "Lost: The Siblings of Jeff Linn"	November 1, 1996	11.6
270	6	Mystery: Jarod Allgood and Heidee Ruiz. Wanted: Karen Pelletiere/Missing: William Pelletiere. Missing: Susan Harrison. Lost loves: The Sister of Lois Cappoziello. Special Bulletin: Case #1: Missing: Lance Guevarra. Special Bulletin: Case #2: Missing: Jesús de la Cruz	November 8, 1996	11.7
271	7	Mystery: Howard Storm. Murder: Alicia Showalter Reynolds. Lost loves: Savior of Steve Newton. Mystery: Stephanie Booker. Special Bulletin: Case #1: Wanted: Jimmy Ray LeGate/Missing: Karen Lofland. Special Bulletin: Case #2: Wanted: Michael Wilburn. Update: "Wanted: Richard Cepulonis/Missing: Karen Walters". Update: "Wanted: Kelly Lee McGinnis"	November 15, 1996	14.2
272	8	Mystery: Qi Gong. Wanted: Whitey Bulger and Catherine Greig. Missing: Le-Zhan Williams. Mystery: O. J. Simpson. Special Bulletin: Wanted: Samuel Glover and Marshall Kirkpatrick. Special Bulletin: Wanted: Robert Trenholm	November 22, 1996	12.9
273	9	Wanted: Michael Short and Melody Woods. Lost loves: The Parents of Gayle Samuels. Mystery: Lynn Amos. Mystery: Cokeville Elementary School Explosion. Special Bulletin: Lost loves: The Parents of Regina Davis. Special Bulletin: Lost loves: The Sister of Charlene Long. Update: "Lost loves: The Daughter of Dave and Christie Carlsen"	December 13, 1996	12.1
274	10	Wanted: The Zodiac Killer (repeat from September 20, 1996). Wanted: William Jordan (repeat from September 20, 1996). Missing: Kristin Smart (repeat from September 20, 1996). Missing: April Gregory (repeat from September 20, 1996). Wanted: Carl and Mary Denny (repeat from December 1, 1995)	December 27, 1996	12.3
275	11	Wanted: Connie Jean Helton/Missing: Zenith Elaine Helton. Mystery: Boo, Oscar, and Ringo. Wanted: Zip Gun Bomber. Lost loves: Kelli Ann Ayres. Murder: Sandra Orellana. Special Bulletin: Wanted: Jimmy Wayne Pierce. Wanted: Elena Souza (repeat from October 25, 1996)	January 3, 1997	14.01
276	12	Mystery: Bee Sting Healing. Wanted: Sagebrush Rebellion. Mystery: Alex Kelly. Murder: Jamie Santos. Special Bulletin: Wanted: Gary Wilson. Update: "Lost loves: Christopher Kurowski"	January 10, 1997	14.69
277	13	Legend: Oliver. Wanted: Dennis Keith Smith/Missing: Carolyn Killaby. Lost loves: The Saviour of Renee Wilson. Missing: Susan Walsh. Murder: JonBenét Ramsey. Update: "Wanted: Jimmy Ray LeGate"	January 31, 1997	14.66
278	14	Mystery: Duane Pickel. Mystery: Tommy Zeigler. Mystery: Kurt Cobain	February 7, 1997	14.61
279	15	Mystery: Dr. Cynthia Watson. Mystery: TWA Flight 800 and US Marine Corps Helicopter Crash. Murder: Robert Dirscherl. Mystery: Comet/Earth Collision. Special Bulletin: Murder: Ennis Cosby. Special Bulletin: Wanted David Alex Alvarez. Update: "Murder: Sandra Orellana". Update: "Michele Cartagena and Grant Hendrickson"/"Wanted: Andy Cook"	February 14, 1997	11.19
280	16	Mystery: Olesen Family. Murder: Patrick Sean Kelly. Mystery: Highway 50 Phantom. Missing: Ceara O'Connell/Murder: Naoma and Richard Wendorf. Special Bulletin: Wanted: Edwin Rodriguez. Special Bulletin: Wanted: Billy Ray Sisen. Update: "Lost loves: Kelli Ann Ayres"	February 21, 1997	12.87
281	17	Murder: Tupac Shakur. Missing: Therese Rose Walsh/Wanted: Merle Marie Vanderheiden. Wanted: Gary and Ted Noble. Spontaneous Human Combustion: Mystery: Kay Fletcher/George Mott/Irving Bentley	March 14, 1997	14.38
282	18	Mystery: David Morehouse. Wanted: Maria "Rosa" Hernandez. Wanted: Melvin Luther Wilson. Mystery: Dolly the Sheep. Special Bulletin: Wanted: Mark Gagliardo. Update: "Lost loves: Raymond Routte". Update: "Wanted: Andre Wilson"	March 28, 1997	10.69
283	19	Wanted: Maria Socorro De Rodriguez LaPine (The Black Widow). Mystery: TWA Flight 800. Mystery: Candy and Roxy. Legend: The Ghosts of the Smith Home. Update: "Wanted: Samuel Glover and Marshall Kirkpatrick". Special Bulletin: Wanted: Mark Gagliardo (repeat from March 28, 1997)	April 4, 1997	12.59
284	20	Wanted: Jeanette Federico. Lost: Susan Harrison (repeat from November 8, 1996). Wanted: Karen Pelletiere (repeat from November 8, 1996)	April 11, 1997	12.19
285	21	Legend: Men in black. Mystery: Blair Adams. Lost loves: The Son of Bobbi Page Myler. Mystery: Rosemary Altea. Update: "Lost loves: The Siblings of Jeff Linn". Update: "Missing: Candace and Sharina Berry". Update: "Wanted: Dennis Kevin Smith"	April 18, 1997	10.69
286	22	Wanted: Don Davis Jr. Mystery: Lynne Plaskett. Mystery: Carolyn Reynolds links Astrological Charts to Serial Killers. Lost loves: Susan King. Special Bulletin: Wanted: Trent Fouts/Murder: Joshua Massengill. Murder: Kristie Gunderson Lee (repeat from September 13, 1996)	April 25, 1997	11.60
287	23	Lost loves: Savior of Samantha Roberts. Murder: Aimee Willard. Wanted: David Thompson. Mystery: Chase Bowman. Mystery: Cynthia Armistead/Jayne Hitchcock. Lost loves: The Daughter of Dave and Christie Carlsen (repeat from September 13, 1996)	May 2, 1997	10.60
288	24	Legend: Amazon Women. Mystery: The Oakville Blobs. Mystery: David Shublak. Murder: Dimitric Moore	May 9, 1997	11.91
289	25	Wanted: Salvatore Spinnato. Mystery: Reverend Ralph DiOrio. Murder: Dana Satterfield. Lost loves: The Friend of Moises Treves. Wanted: Atlanta/Spokane Bomber. Update: "Wanted: David Gause"	May 16, 1997	8.88
290	26	Update: "Wanted: Jimmy Wayne Pierce". Mystery: Stephanie Booker (repeat from November 15, 1996)	May 23, 1997	9.27
291	27	Missing: Therese Rose Walsh/Wanted: Merle Marie Vanderheiden (repeat from March 14, 1997). Wanted: Maria Hernandez (repeat from March 28, 1997). Wanted: Melvin Luther Wilson (repeat from March 28, 1997)	August 8, 1997	8.00

=== Season 10 (1997–98) ===
No. overall	No. in season	Mystery	Original release date	U.S. viewers (millions)
292	1	Legend: Elvis Presley. Mystery: Joe McCarthy, Herman Stegos, and Michael Landon. Mystery: Monika Rizzo. Murder: Candy Belt and Gloria Ross	November 13, 1997	10.35
293	2	Mystery: Joffre Ramos/Wanted: Luie Quezada. Special Bulletin: Wanted: Michelle Abraham/Missing: Chrystal Didonato and Jessica Abraham. Lost loves: Mary Agnes Gross. Murder: Kathy Page. Mystery: Bible code	April 3, 1998	9.96
294	3	Wanted: Michael Wayne Brown/Missing: Donna Moses Brown. Special Bulletin: Wanted: Ngoc Van Tran. Wanted: Marvin Gabrion/Missing: Shannon Verhage, Wayne Davis, John Weeks, and Robert Allen/Murder: Rachel Timmerman. Mystery: Pat Brown. Legend: Nanteos Cup	April 10, 1998	10.33
295	4	Missing: Wendy Von Huben/Murder: Jesse Howell. Legend: Woods Home. Special Bulletin: Wanted: Jose Blandon. Special Bulletin: Wanted: Marshall Lee Brown	April 17, 1998	9.03
296	5	Legend: Chair of Death. Lost loves: Savior of Wilma Drew. Mystery: Katherine Korzilius. Wanted: Paul Ragusa. Wanted: Francis C. Buhay. Update: "Wanted: Trent Fouts"	May 22, 1998	11.19
297	6	Legend: Phoenix Lights. Lost loves: The Children of Doreen Espinoza. Wanted: Sharon Kinne. Road Rage Incident Segments:. Murder: Richard Aderson. Murder: Robert James. Update: "Wanted: Gary and Ted Noble"	May 29, 1998	10.90

=== Season 11 (1999) ===
No. overall	No. in season	Mystery	Original release date	U.S. viewers (millions)
298	1	Murder: Brook Baker. Murder: Bugsy Siegel. Missing: Sabrina Aisenberg. Mystery: Audrey Santo. Mystery: Henry Weingarten	April 2, 1999	9.44
299	2	Wanted: Jason McVean and Alan Pilon. Legend: The Skunk Ape. Legend: The Ghosts of the Delta Queen Riverboat. Murder: Michelle Witherell. Mystery: Nicolai Levashov	April 9, 1999	10.04
300	3	Mystery: Jayson Artis. Missing: Amy Wroe Bechtel. Murder: Chansami and Abby Thammavong. Legend: The Ghosts of Loews Cottage. Mystery: John Holland and Elizabeth Joyce	April 16, 1999	9.63
301	4	Wanted: Alan Golder. Murder: Ted Binion. Mystery: Nostradamus and New Millennium Predictions. Missing: Amy Bradley. Lost loves: Saviors of Doris Smith/Mystery: Thomas Wright	May 28, 1999	7.63
302	5	Legend: Carol Parrish and Juelle. Murder: Jessica Lyn Keen. Lost loves: Benjamin Austin Baker. Lost loves: Gerry and Terry Robinson. Mystery: Norman/Lulu. Wanted: Rick Vallee	June 4, 1999	9.82
303	6	Murder: Cam Lyman. Lost loves: Ok-Cha Wortman. Mystery: Charlene Richard. Mystery: Hartford Office of Paranormal Exploration. Missing: Jim Wood	June 11, 1999	9.35

=== Season 12 (2001–02) ===
No. overall	No. in season	Mystery	Original release date
304	1	Murder: Linda Sherman	July 2, 2001
305	2	Murder: Danny and Kathy Freeman/Missing: Lauria Bible and Ashley Freeman	July 3, 2001
306	3	Murder: Bryan Nisenfeld	July 4, 2001
307	4	Missing: Traci Kenley and Bill Rundle	July 5, 2001
308	5	Lost loves: The Family of Dolores Camarena. Missing: Amy Wroe Bechtel (repeat from April 16, 1999)	July 9, 2001
309	6	Wanted: James Sullivan. Missing: Amy Bradley (repeat from May 28, 1999)	July 10, 2001
310	7	Mystery: Eagle	July 11, 2001
311	8	Missing: Trisha Autry	July 12, 2001
312	9	Mystery: Dee Klepper and Gus Ortega	July 16, 2001
313	10	Wanted: Craig Pritchert and Nova Guthrie	July 17, 2001
314	11	Missing: Landon and Logan Walker/Wanted: Craig Walker. Wanted: Alan Golder (repeat from May 28, 1999)	July 18, 2001
315	12	Wanted: Jerry Lee Bowen	July 19, 2001
316	13	Missing: Kristen Modafferi	July 20, 2001
317	14	Legend: The Ghosts of the Lizzie Borden House	July 23, 2001
318	15	Mystery: Sonya Fitzpatrick	July 24, 2001
319	16	Legend: Jones House	July 25, 2001
320	17	Mystery: Yefim Shubentsov	July 26, 2001
321	18	Wanted: John Addis	July 30, 2001
322	19	Legend: The Ghosts of the Myrtles Plantation. Murder: Judith Smith	August 1, 2001
323	20	Wanted: Jesse James Hollywood. Murder: Jessica Lyn Keen (repeat from June 4, 1999)	August 2, 2001
324	21	Wanted: Desiree Perkins. Special Bulletin: Wanted: Carl McWilliams. Mystery: Jayson Artis (repeat from April 16, 1999)	August 6, 2001
325	22	Missing: Wil Hendrick. Murder: Richard Aderson/Murder: Robert James (repeat from May 29, 1998). Legend: Nazca Lines (repeat from April 19, 1996). Mystery: Logan Carroll (repeat from November 3, 1995)	August 7, 2001
326	23	Lost loves: Debra and Diana Cordova	August 8, 2001
327	24	Wanted: Gordon Weaver. Wanted: James "Whitey" Bulger and Catherine Greig (repeat from November 22, 1996)	August 9, 2001
328	25	Missing: Leah Roberts	August 13, 2001
329	26	Wanted: Arthur Lopez Jr.	August 14, 2001
330	27	Mystery: Natasha Jennings	August 15, 2001
331	28	Wanted: Clayton Waagner	August 16, 2001
332	29	Murder: Jodie Bordeaux	August 20, 2001
333	30	Mystery: Dr. Emily Craig/Missing: Diane Washer/Murder: Nancy Daddysman	August 21, 2001
334	31	Wanted: Malaika Griffin	August 22, 2001
335	32	Mystery: Karen and Kathy Mills. Wanted: Sharon Kinne (repeat from May 29, 1998). Mystery: Carolyn Hebert/Elaine Emmi/Linda Babb (repeat from March 23, 1994). Murder: Joe Cole (repeat from May 17, 1996)	August 23, 2001
336	33	Mystery: Darlie Routier	August 24, 2001
337	34	Missing: David Shipenburg. Wanted: Jason McVean and Alan Pilon (repeat from April 9, 1999)	August 27, 2001
338	35	Missing: Morgan Nick. Missing: Jacqueline Castaneda	August 28, 2001
339	36	Murder: Warren Fulton and Rachael Raver/Murder: Tina Jefferson. Update: Lost loves: Susan King. Mystery: Candy and Roxy (repeat from April 4, 1997). Murder: Martha Moxley (repeat from February 16, 1996)	August 29, 2001
340	37	Missing: Claudia Kirschhoch. Legend: Fertility Statues (repeat from October 18, 1996). Wanted: Raymond Young (repeat from November 17, 1993). Mystery: Patricia Stallings (repeat from May 8, 1991)	August 31, 2001
341	38	Missing: Margie Jelovcic/Wanted: Randy Mark Yager	September 4, 2001
342	39	Wanted: Carlos Berdeja. Wanted: Michael Wayne Brown / Lost loves: Donna Moses Brown (repeat from April 10, 1998). Mystery: Lonnie Zamora UFO Sighting (repeat from December 1, 1995). Wanted: William Jordan (repeat from September 20, 1996)	September 5, 2001
343	40	Mystery: Michael Owen and Wendy Throop. Missing: Gordon Page Jr. (repeat from October 4, 1994). Lost loves: Ok-Cha Wortman (repeat from June 11, 1999)	September 6, 2001
344	41	Wanted: Karl and Helen Rehberg. Lost loves: Ok-Cha Wortman (repeat from June 11, 1999)	September 7, 2001
345	42	Missing: Jill Behrman	September 10, 2001
346	43	Mystery: Lois Gibson/Mystery: Jason and Phillip Bomer	September 11, 2001
347	44	Murder: Mike Emert. Wanted: Maria Hernandez (repeat from March 28, 1997). Lost loves: Michelle Fazzani (repeat from August 12, 1992). Mystery: West End Baptist Church (repeat from January 3, 1990)	September 12, 2001
348	45	Wanted: Michael Alfonso	October 1, 2001
349	46	Wanted: Heather Tallchief and Roberto Solis	October 2, 2001
350	47	Wanted: Dr. Gregory Caplinger	October 3, 2001
351	48	Missing: Leonard Dirickson. Update: Wanted: Michael Wayne Brown / Lost loves: Donna Moses Brown. Missing: Kristi Krebs (repeat from February 17, 1995). Missing: Sabrina Aisenberg (repeat from April 2, 1999). Murder: Lynn Amos (repeat from December 13, 1996)	October 4, 2001
352	49	Missing: Star Palumbo. Update: Wanted: Elizabeth Ortiz / Missing: Jonathan Ortiz. Lost loves: Mary Agnes Gross (repeat from April 3, 1998). Mystery: Bill and Dorothy Wacker (repeat from May 25, 1994). Missing: April Gregory / Missing: Kristin Smart (repeat from September 20, 1996)	October 15, 2001
353	50	Missing: Curtis Pishon	October 16, 2001
354	51	Missing: Cynthia "Cindy" Wismiller	October 17, 2001
355	52	Missing: Wendi Long	October 18, 2001
356	53	Wanted: Regina and Margaret DeFrancisco	November 19, 2001
357	54	Mystery: Harper's Ferry Remains	November 26, 2001
358	55	Murder: Megan Curl. Update: Wanted: Don Davis Jr. Mystery: George Reeves (repeat from December 8, 1995)	April 29, 2002

=== Season 13 (2002) ===
No. overall	No. in season	Mystery	Original release date
359	1	Unexplained death: Chandra Levy and Joyce Chiang. Murder: Christine Mirzayan	June 10, 2002
360	2	Missing: Dr. Sneha Philip	June 11, 2002
361	3	Wanted: Eric Rudolph. Mystery: Bruce Kelly (repeat from September 22, 1993). Murder: Chad Maurer (repeat from December 11, 1991)	June 12, 2002
362	4	Missing: Amber Swartz, Ilene Misheloff, Nikki Campbell, and Michaela Garecht/Murder: Angela Bugay. Mystery: Wyrick House (repeat from October 21, 1994). Lost: Gus Hoffman (repeat from April 26, 1989)	June 13, 2002
363	5	Wanted: Frank Montenegro. Update: "Murder: Mickey and Trudy Thompson"	June 14, 2002
364	6	Murder: Mary Morris and Mary Morris	June 17, 2002
365	7	Wanted: Robert William Fisher	June 18, 2002
366	8	Wanted: Stephen Anderson	June 19, 2002
367	9	Wanted: Anthrax Killer	June 20, 2002
368	10	Mystery: The Family of Monica Libao	June 21, 2002
369	11	Wanted: Ann Kibalo/Missing: Samantha Kibalo	June 24, 2002
370	12	Missing: Holly Krewson	June 25, 2002
371	13	Mystery: Albert Wong and Jessica Constant	June 26, 2002
372	14	Wanted: Kristine Sue Westin and Kevin Dale Woo	June 27, 2002
373	15	Update: "Mystery: Albert DeSalvo aka The Boston Strangler"	June 28, 2002
374	16	Wanted: Frederick Russell. Lost loves: Savior of Steve Newton (repeat from November 15, 1996). Wanted: Rafael Camarena (repeat from April 24, 1991)	July 1, 2002
375	17	Wanted: David Lee Kemp. Murder: Chaim Weiss (repeat from May 6, 1992). Wanted: Mahfuz Huq (repeat from September 23, 1992). Mystery: Tony Marabella (repeat from April 12, 1996)	July 2, 2002
376	18	Wanted: Omar Arroyo	July 3, 2002
377	19	Wanted: Stryder Styarfyr. Wanted: Hazel Head	July 8, 2002
378	20	Wanted: James Kilgore	July 12, 2002
379	21	Mystery: Mia and Shadow	July 15, 2002
380	22	Legend: The Ghosts of Black Hope	July 17, 2002
381	23	Mystery: Gazebo Baby. Lost loves: The Parents of Kimberly Smith. Wanted: Richard Cepulonis/Karen Walters (repeat from March 15, 1996). Legend: Chupacabras (repeat from April 26, 1996). Wanted: Tom Johnson (repeat from April 27, 1994)	July 19, 2002
382	24	Wanted: East Area Rapist aka the Original Night Stalker. Murder: Robert Hamrick (repeat from November 20, 1991). Mystery: E.L.F. (repeat from May 19, 1995)	July 22, 2002
383	25	Murder: Eric Tamiyasu	July 26, 2002
384	26	Legend: Mothman	July 29, 2002
385	27	Legend: Canada Crop Circles	August 2, 2002
386	28	Wanted: Jon and Molly Maggio	August 8, 2002
387	29	Missing: Colleen Wood. Mystery: Sam Zelikson (repeat from October 25, 1996). Murder: Jamie Santos (repeat from January 10, 1997). Wanted: Greg Webb (repeat from October 18, 1989)	August 9, 2002
388	30	Murder: Opal Zacharias/Wanted: Lance Bedgood. Special Alert: Missing: Rachel Cooke. Wanted: Sharon Rogers Car Bomber (repeat from February 17, 1993). Mystery: Bobby Fuller (repeat from October 18, 1996). Mystery: Luiz Gasparetto (repeat from March 24, 1995)	August 12, 2002
389	31	Wanted: William Fischer	August 16, 2002
390	32	Wanted: Frank Isley/Missing: Lisa Myers	August 19, 2002
391	33	Murder: Donna Baldeo, Jailall Lewis, and Bunnie Terry. Update: "Wanted: Lyle Moody"	August 20, 2002
392	34	Murder: Janice and Alyssa Owen	August 21, 2002
393	35	Murder: Erica Richardson/Wanted: John Feiga	August 22, 2002
394	36	Murder: Carson Prince. Update: "Missing: Wendi Long". Lost: Le-Zhan Williams/Murder: Daphne Boyden (repeat from November 22, 1996). Mystery: Stuart Heaton/Murder: Krystal Naab (repeat from December 16, 1994)	August 23, 2002
395	37	Wanted: Margo Freshwater	August 26, 2002
396	38	Wanted: Joe Morrow. Mystery: Linda Tellington-Jones (repeat from November 17, 1995). Wanted: Brad Bishop (repeat from January 9, 1991). Wanted: David Viera (repeat from April 13, 1994)	August 27, 2002
397	39	Wanted: Rufino Castaneda. Mystery: Rick McCue/Murder: Alene Courchesne (repeat from January 6, 1993). Lost loves: The Friends of Fritz Vincken (repeat from March 24, 1995)	August 28, 2002
398	40	Murder: Jennifer Lueth and Diane Shawcroft	August 29, 2002
399	41	Murder: Damien Corrente/Wanted: Juan Gill Ferrufino, Mario Portillo, and German DeLeon. Mystery: Carolyn Reynolds (repeat from April 25, 1997). Lost loves: Saviors of Colleen Frangione (repeat from December 1, 1993). Missing: Clifford Sherwood and George Gumbly (repeat from October 7, 1992)	September 3, 2002
400	42	Missing: Molly Bish. Murder: Bonnie Craig	September 4, 2002
401	43	Mystery: Fallon Cancer	September 6, 2002
402	44	Missing: Dale Williams	September 16, 2002
403	45	Wanted: Laura Law. Legend: Padre Pio (repeat from January 20, 1995). Wanted: Ngoc Van Tran (repeat from April 10, 1998). Wanted: Maria Armstrong (repeat from November 29, 1989)	September 17, 2002
404	46	Missing: Cindy Song	September 18, 2002
405	47	Missing: Marilyn "Niqui" McCown	September 19, 2002
406	48	Missing: Miranda Gaddis and Ashley Pond	September 20, 2002

=== Season 14 (2008–10) ===
No. overall	No. in season	Mystery	Original release date
407	1	Unexplained Death: Kurt Cobain. Murder with Update: Candy Belt and Gloria Ross. Solved: Andy Cook. Wanted with Update: Jesse James Hollywood. The Unexplained: HOPE. Missing with Update: Devin Williams	October 13, 2008
408	2	Legends: Elvis Presley. UFO: Kecksburg UFO. Solved: Ted Binion. Murder: Joe Cole. Wanted with Update: Greg Webb	October 13, 2008
409	3	Unexplained Death with Update: Sammy Wheeler. Murder: Richard Bare. Wanted with Update: Ira Einhorn. Solved: Greg Webb. Ghosts: Gettysburg National Military Park. Escape: Randall Utterback	October 14, 2008
410	4	Wanted with Update: Stephen Anderson. Solved: Don Davis Jr. Medical Mystery: Jean Hilliard. Robbery: Minnesota Brinks Heist. Missing with Update: Robert Arcieri. Murder: Jodie Bordeaux	October 14, 2008
411	5	Solved: Albert Leon Fletcher. Wanted with Update: Craig Pritchert and Nova Guthrie. The Unexplained: Howard Storm. Robbery with Update: Heather Tallchief and Roberto Solis. Unexplained Death: Patrick Kelly. Sci-Med with Update: Alie Berrelez	October 15, 2008
412	6	Missing: Justin Burgwinkel. Solved: Stockton Arsonist. UFO: Phoenix Lights. Unexplained Death: Brandon Lee. Escape: Frank Morris and the Anglin Brothers	October 15, 2008
413	7	Wanted with Update: Jason McVean and Alan Pilon. Fraud: Jonathan Kern. Solved: Larry George. The Unexplained: Dannion Brinkley. Murder with Update: Mickey and Trudy Thompson. Missing: Gordon Collins	October 16, 2008
414	8	Murder: Tupac Shakur. The Unexplained: Bigfoot. Solved: Gary and Ted Noble. Wanted with Update: Frederick Russell. Investigators: Jack Davis Jr. Missing: Yves-Emmanuel Pain and Laurent Hernas	October 16, 2008
415	9	Wanted: Wallace Thrasher. Solved: Clayton Waagner. The Unexplained: San Pedro Mummy. Wanted: Timothy Coombs. Legends: Bugsy Siegel. Murder with Update: Martha Moxley	October 17, 2008
416	10	Wanted with Update: Edward Bell. Unexplained Death with Update: Monika Rizzo. Amnesia with Update: Pierre April. Solved: Wendi Long. Missing: Lee Young. The Unexplained: Canada Crop Circles	October 17, 2008
417	11	Wanted with Update: Randolph Dial. The Unexplained: Lonnie Zamora UFO Sighting. Murder: Dr. Martin Luther King. Solved: John Purvis	October 20, 2008
418	12	Unexplained Death: Thomas Burkett. The Unexplained: Boo; Oscar; Ringo. Solved: David Gordon Smith. Wanted with Update: Rick Vallee. Final Appeal: Darlie Routier	October 20, 2008
419	13	Unexplained Death: Blair Adams. Robbery with Update: Thomas David Dixon. Wanted: Stephanie Booker. Treasure with Update: Yamashita's Treasure. Lost Loves: The Friend of Stephan Ross	October 21, 2008
420	14	Final Appeal: Dan Montecalvo. The Unexplained: Caddy. Missing with Update: David Stone. Solved: Arthur Frankford. Wanted with Update: John "Thumper" Brown	October 21, 2008
421	15	UFO: Roswell Crash. Missing: Dottie Caylor. Unexplained Death: Jeffrey Digman. Solved: Steven Cox. Arson: Inner City Church Fire	October 22, 2008
422	16	Robbery with Update: Vallejo Armored Car Murders. Solved: Fumbles. Murder: The Black Dahlia. Wanted with Update: Rafael Camarena. The Unexplained: Black Hope	October 22, 2008
423	17	Wanted with Update: Gainesville Killers. Amnesia with Update: Tyler. Murder: Jesslyn Rich. Solved: Michael Swango. Ghosts: Three Partners Ranch. Missing: A. J. Breaux	October 23, 2008
424	18	Wanted: Obia-Man. Murder with Update: Danny and Kathy Freeman. Fraud with Update: Todd Mueller. Solved: John Mooney. The Unexplained: Joe O'Brien. Amnesia with Update: Pat Brown	October 23, 2008
425	19	Murder: Eric Tamiyasu. Fraud with Update: Kevin Poulsen. Treasure: Skeleton Canyon Treasure. Robbery with Update: Terry Lee Conner and Joseph Dougherty. Wanted with Update: Joe Smith. Wanted with Update: Richard Cepulonis	October 24, 2008
426	20	Murder: Boston Strangler. Missing with Update: Wendy Von Huben. The Unexplained: Interceptors. Lost Loves with Update: Dolores Stradt	October 24, 2008
427	21	Wanted with Update: Randy Yager. Arson with Update: Kansas City Arsonist. UFO: The Allagash Abductions. Missing: Amy Wroe Bechtel	October 27, 2008
428	22	Escape with Update: Paul Stamper. Missing: Susan Walsh. Treasure: Trabuca Treasure. Murder: Su Taraskiewicz. Solved: Lee Selwyn. Fraud with Update: Tom Hughes	October 27, 2008
429	23	Legends: D. B. Cooper. Wanted with Update: Richard Church. Solved: Wade Mitchell Parker. The Unexplained: Chair of Death. Missing: Colleen Wood	October 28, 2008
430	24	Unexplained Death: Jayson Artis. Sci-Med: Jarod Allgood; Heidee Ruiz. Missing: Ray Hickingbotham. Ghosts: Smith Home. Solved: Dennis Keith Smith	October 28, 2008
431	25	Unexplained Death: David Cox. The Unexplained: Yeti. Amnesia: Sarah Powell. Murder: Tom Roche. Solved: Jerry Gervasoni. Robbery: Victor Gerena	October 29, 2008
432	26	Unexplained Death with Update: Ted Binion. Solved: Kansas City Arsonist. Wanted: Richard Aderson. UFO: Frederick Valentich. Murder with Update: John and Linda Sohus. Sci-Med: David Morehouse	October 29, 2008
433	27	Unexplained Death: Sonny Liston. Murder with Update: David Davis. UFO: Belgium UFO. Solved: Mickey and Trudy Thompson. Wanted: Rohrey Wychgel	October 30, 2008
434	28	Murder: Roger Dean. Missing: Jean Moore. The Unexplained: John Holland; Elizabeth Joyce. Wanted with Update: Larry George. Solved: Robert Watson. Treasure: Bannack Treasure	October 30, 2008
435	29	Murder: Michael Francke. Solved: Pierre April. Wanted with Update: Albert Leon Fletcher. Legends: Butcher of Kingsbury Run. Missing: Charles Horvath. The Unexplained: Mystery Rock	October 31, 2008
436	30	Unexplained Death: Shane Stewart and Sally McNelly. Wanted with Update: John Roubas. Amnesia: Sarah DiGennaro. Fraud: Philip Breen. Solved: Charles Warren Boomer. Arson with Update: Donna Baldeo, Jailall Lewis, and Bunnie Terry	October 31, 2008
437	31	Missing: Amy Bradley. Solved: Thomas David Dixon. Wanted with Update: Agustin Mendoza. Ghosts: Hotel Bullock. Sci-Med: Kay Fletcher; George Mott; Irving Bentley. Unexplained Death: Danny Williams	November 3, 2008
438	32	Unexplained Death: Linda Sherman. The Unexplained: Cokeville Elementary School Explosion. Wanted with Update: Michael Swango. Solved: Brian Brophil. Robbery with Update: Rochester Car Heist. Missing: Star Palumbo	November 3, 2008
439	33	The Unexplained: Bruce Kelly. Murder with Update: Gordon Weaver. Solved: Joe Smith. Sci-Med: Oliver. Wanted: Salvatore Caruana	November 4, 2008
440	34	Missing: Melissa Jo Sermons. UFO: Mexico City UFO. Solved: William Eugene Hilliard. Fraud with Update: Louis Carlucci. Unexplained Death: Nancy Manni; Elizabeth Greenberg. Abduction with Update: Clifford Sleigh	November 4, 2008
441	35	Murder with Update: Green River Killer. Solved: Elizabeth Ortiz. Ghosts: Delta Queen Riverboat. Unexplained Death: Michael O'Mara. Missing: Lenny Dirickson. Fraud: John Hawkins	November 5, 2008
442	36	Unexplained Death: Patsy Wright. Abduction: John Grundhofer. Solved: Martha Moxley. Fraud with Update: Filemon Santiago and Gary Miller. Missing with Update: Craig Williamson. Medical Mystery: David Shublak	November 5, 2008
443	37	Unexplained Death: Doug Johnston. Missing: Claudia Kirschhoch. Treasure: Dutch Schultz Treasure. The Unexplained: Harold Bennett. Solved: Paul Stamper. Murder with Update: Neal Jennings	November 6, 2008
444	38	Wanted with Update: Jim Burnside. Sci-Med: The Shroud of Turin. Missing: Robert Borton. Murder: Megan Curl. Lost Loves: Duncan Gilmore	November 6, 2008
445	39	Unexplained Death: Arnold Archambeau and Ruby Bruguier. Ghosts: Resurrection Cemetery. Investigators: TWA Flight 800. Wanted with Update: Gary and Ted Noble. Solved: Ethel Kidd. Lost Heirs with Update: Heirs of Dan Willans	November 7, 2008
446	40	Murder: Michael Johnston and Rochelle Robinson. Sci-Med: Olesen Family. Solved: Dennis Keith Smith. Wanted with Update: Rose Turford and Carolyn Stevens. Missing with Update: Dede Rosenthal. Escape with Update: Edgar Kerns	November 7, 2008
447	41	Murder with Update: Mia Zapata. Legends: Brushy Bill Roberts. Wanted: Maria Hernandez. The Unexplained: Glen Loney; Rhonda and Roxanne Anderson; Catherine Webb. Investigators with Update: 1987 Jane Doe	November 10, 2008
448	42	Wanted: Adam Emery. Murder: Jill and Julie Hansen. The Unexplained: Coral Polge. Solved: David Viera. Amnesia: Tony Marabella	November 10, 2008
449	43	Murder: Mark Groezinger. The Unexplained: George Anderson. Wanted with Update: Eric Rudolph. Solved: Brook Baker. Wanted: Jack Quinn	November 11, 2008
450	44	Amnesia: Tyler. Unexplained Death: Tony Lombardi. Ghosts: Wyrick House. Investigators: Jeanne Boylan. Murder with Update: Jerry Lee Bowen	November 11, 2008
451	45	Robbery with Update: Jose Gonzalez. Wanted with Update: Richard Minns. Solved: Johnny Lee Wilson. Unexplained Death: Jamie Santos. Ghosts: Lizzie Borden House	November 12, 2008
452	46	Unexplained Death: George Reeves. Robbery with Update: Charles Warren Boomer. Ghosts: La Posada Hotel. Solved: Jim Burnside. Treasure: Matt and Wendy Jameson. Murder: Dexter Stefonek	November 12, 2008
453	47	Escape with Update: Margo Freshwater. Unexplained Death: Ed Baker. Ghosts: Mann House. Missing Persons: The Crew of the Casie Nicole. Solved: Maria Armstrong. Murder with Update: Kelly Lee McGinnis	November 13, 2008
454	48	Legends: Bermuda Triangle. Solved: Saviors of Dover Family. Escape with Update: Michael Wayne Brown; Donna Moses Brown. Sci-Med: Michael Ziegler; George and Marie. Unexplained Death: Bryan Nisenfeld	November 13, 2008
455	49	Wanted with Update: Ann Sigmin and Gary Goff. Murder with Update: Chandra Levy and Joyce Chiang; Christine Mirzayan. Treasure: Victorio Peak Treasure. Fraud with Update: Judge John Fairbanks	November 14, 2008
456	50	Robbery: Cawood Burglary. Treasure: Adam's Treasure. Solved: Edgar Kerns. The Unexplained: Men In Black. Fraud with Update: Omar Arroyo. Wanted with Update: Charles Mule	November 14, 2008
457	51	Wanted with Update: James Kilgore. Missing with Update: Dr. Sneha Philip. Murder: Mike Emert. The Unexplained: Sam Zelikson. Robbery with Update: Cindy Wismiller. Missing: Jodi Huisentruit	November 17, 2008
458	52	Wanted with Update: Clayton Waagner. UFO: Hudson River UFO. Solved: Craig Williamson. Unexplained Death: Judith Smith. Murder: Jian Fang	November 17, 2008
459	53	Unexplained Death: Kathy Page. The Unexplained: Falcon Lake UFO. Murder: Dwayne McCorkendale. Treasure: Lost Dutchman Mine. Missing with Update: Jill Behrman	November 18, 2008
460	54	Missing Persons with Update: Charlotte Pollis. Unexplained Death: Chad Langford. Escape with Update: Michael Short; Melody Woods. Solved: Duncan Gilmore. The Unexplained: Nazca Lines	November 18, 2008
461	55	Murder with Update: Dennis DePue. Solved: Ann Corricelli and Lena Marie Wilson. Wanted with Update: Armando Garcia. Legends: Bigfoot. Unexplained Death: Gary Grant Jr.. Fraud with Update: Arthur Frankford	November 19, 2008
462	56	Murder with Update: Joann Albanese; John Addis. Wanted with Update: Astarte Davis. Wanted: Phillip Fraser. Solved: Louis Carlucci. Lost Loves with Update: The Family of LaDonna Alfano. Legends: Nanteos Cup	November 19, 2008
463	57	Unexplained Death: Keith Warren. Robbery: Scott Enyart. Missing: Cindy Song. Ghosts: Covewood Lodge. Abduction with Update: Ceara O'Connell. Solved: Jim Burke	November 20, 2008
464	58	Wanted with Update: Alan Golder. Solved: Edward Bell. Murder: David Merrifield. Unexplained Death: Frank Olson. Ghosts: The General Wayne Inn. Missing: Moses Lall and Lila Buerattan	November 20, 2008
465	59	Unexplained Death: Tom Dixon; Gary Simmons. Solved: Kimberly Pandelious; Linda Sobek. Murder with Update: Pizza Parlor Killer. Investigators: Noah's Ark. Missing with Update: Wendi Long. Ghosts with Update: Loews Cottage	November 21, 2008
466	60	Wanted: Sharon Rogers. The Unexplained: Milly McGregor. Solved: Dennis DePue. Murder with Update: Jerry Gervasoni. Fraud with Update: Steven Cox. Lost Loves with Update: Christopher Kurowski	November 21, 2008
467	61	Unexplained Death: Danny Casolaro. Solved: Rose Turford and Carolyn Stevens. The Unexplained: Mothman. Treasure: Elysian Park Treasure. Murder with Update: James Sullivan. Missing: Gordon Page Jr.	July 13, 2009
468	62	Murder: Mary Morris and Mary Morris. Fraud with Update: Liz Carmichael. Escape with Update: Sam Wodke. Ghosts: Beaty Castle. Lost Heirs with Update: Heirs of Dan Willans. Arson with Update: Church Arsonist	July 13, 2009
469	63	Wanted with Update: Mahfuz Huq. Ghosts: Harden House. Solved: Jim Pearson. Murder: Amtrak Derailment. Investigators: Lois Gibson. Fraud with Update: Dr. Gregory Caplinger	July 14, 2009
470	64	Murder with Update: Jeanne Tovrea. Miracles: Medjugorje Miracles. Unexplained Death: Eric and Pam Ellender. Missing Persons: Mary Ann Perez	July 14, 2009
471	65	Unexplained Death: Michael Carmichael and Billy Ray Hargrove. Fraud with Update: Edward Maynard. Wanted with Update: Michael Alfonso. The Unexplained: West End Baptist Church. Missing with Update: Traci Kenley and Bill Rundle	July 15, 2009
472	66	The Unexplained: Etta Smith. Fraud: Dan Tondevald. Robbery with Update: Valley Bank Robbery. Medical Mystery: Don Hamilton. Solved: The Mother of Tim Harrell. Wanted with Update: Lyle Moody	July 15, 2009
473	67	Final Appeal: Thomas Drake. Wanted with Update: Jon and Molly Maggio. Lost Loves with Update: Kimberly Karen. Solved: Michael Wayne Brown; Donna Moses Brown. Missing Persons with Update: April Gregory; Kristin Smart	July 16, 2009
474	68	The Unexplained: Don Decker. Murder: O'Neal Moore. Solved: Saviors of Dover Family. Wanted: David Hurley. Fraud with Update: Julius Patterson and Paulette Hite	July 16, 2009
475	69	Missing: Baron 52. Unexplained Death: Cindy James. Solved: David Davis. The Unexplained: Fertility Statues. Murder: Blind River Killer. Lost Loves with Update: Philip Pelletier	July 17, 2009
476	70	Unexplained Death: Kurt McFall. Missing: Christi Nichols. Legends: Chupacabras. Wanted: Carlos Berdeja. Lost Heirs with Update: Heirs of Howard Drummond	July 17, 2009
477	71	Unexplained Death: Dave Bocks. Murder: Robert Hamrick. Wanted with Update: James Bulger; Catherine Greig. The Unexplained: Jeanine Price. Lost Heirs with Update: Heirs of George Marsh	July 20, 2009
478	72	Unexplained Death: Circleville Writer; Ron Gillispie. Legends: Champ. Murder with Update: Lisa Marie Kimmell. Solved: Savior of Steve Newton. The Unexplained with Update: The Shroud of Turin	July 20, 2009
479	73	Murder: Son of Sam. Fraud with Update: Liza Montgomery. Wanted with Update: Regina and Margaret Defrancisco. Solved: The Family of LaDonna Alfano. Miracles: Loretto Chapel	July 21, 2009
480	74	Missing Persons: Tami Leppert. Murder with Update: Warren Fulton and Rachael Raver; Tina Jefferson. Wanted with Update: Laura Law. The Unexplained: Robert Matthews; Kristina Florence	July 21, 2009
481	75	Wanted with Update: Joffre Ramos; Luie Quezada. UFO with Update: Betty Cash and Vickie Landrum. Murder with Update: Aimee Willard. Fraud with Update: Josephine White. Solved: Edward Maynard. Lost Loves with Update: Savior of Phillip Macri	July 22, 2009
482	76	Murder: Dick Hansen. Missing with Update: Wendy Camp, Cynthia Britto, and Lisa Kregear. Fraud with Update: Dr. John Anderson. The Unexplained: Lady; Nova. Solved: Julius Patterson and Paulette Hite. Medical Mystery: Candy and Roxy	July 22, 2009
483	77	Murder: Joan Jefferies. Legends: Butch Cassidy. Escape with Update: John Mooney. Ghosts: Jones House. Solved: David Freeman. Wanted with Update: Michael Anthony Starr	July 23, 2009
484	78	Missing: Dale Williams. Wanted with Update: Dana Satterfield. Murder: Hugh and Dian Harlin. Final Appeal with Update: Ryan Stallings	July 23, 2009
485	79	Unexplained Death: Robert Dirscherl. Unexplained Death: Vince Foster. The Unexplained: Carol Parrish and Juelle. Missing Persons with Update: Angelo Desideri. Solved: John Novotny. Sci-Med: Dr. Cynthia Watson	July 24, 2009
486	80	Abduction with Update: Desiree Perkins. Legends: Bermuda Triangle. Wanted with Update: Tina Jefferson. Unexplained Death with Update: Sandra Orellana. Lost Heirs: Heirs of George J. Stein	July 24, 2009
487	81	Unexplained Death: Shelly Malone. Wanted: Bill and Dorothy Wacker. Murder with Update: Jaclyn Dowaliby. Lost Loves with Update: Melvin and Daniel Nellis	July 27, 2009
488	82	Final Appeal: Frederick Young. Arson with Update: Stockton Arsonist. Wanted: Roberto and Eladia Ramirez. Ghosts: The Queen Mary. Lost Loves with Update: The Child of Mac McDonald	July 27, 2009
489	83	Unexplained Death: Natasha Jennings. UFO: Guardian UFO. Murder: Thomas Hotard and Audrey Moate. Solved: James White. Wanted: Brian Foguth	July 28, 2009
490	84	Unexplained Death: Leroy Drieth. Missing with Update: Alex Cooper. Wanted with Update: Sheldon Weinberg. The Unexplained: Kristle Merzlock. The Unexplained: Thomas Sawyer	July 28, 2009
491	85	Murder with Update: Kimberly Pandelious. Final Appeal with Update: Port Chicago Mutiny. Escape with Update: Diane Brodbeck; Jon Yount. Miracles: Reverend Ralph DiOrio. Missing: Conradina Olson	July 29, 2009
492	86	Missing: Oliver Munson. Unexplained Death: Gander Plane Crash. Ghosts: Drum Barracks. Investigators: Alex Kelly. Solved: Ryan Stallings. Wanted with Update: Malaika Griffin	July 29, 2009
493	87	Final Appeal: Tommy Zeigler. Ghosts: The Comedy Store. Fraud with Update: Ann Corricelli and Lena Marie Wilson. Missing with Update: Micki Jo West. Solved: Philip Pelletier	July 30, 2009
494	88	UFO: Rendlesham Forest Incident. Missing: Kristi Krebs. Wanted with Update: Nelson DeCloud. Wanted with Update: Robert Weeks. Unexplained Death: Chaim Weiss	July 30, 2009
495	89	Unexplained Death: David Chase. Lost Loves with Update: Lt. Karen Stephens. Missing with Update: Holly Krewson. Wanted: Tom Johnson. The Unexplained: Margaret Wilson	July 31, 2009
496	90	Unexplained Death: Donald Kemp. Ghosts: Moss Beach Distillery. Missing: Leah Roberts. Solved: Heirs of George Marsh. Wanted with Update: Bike Path Rapist. Sci-Med: Logan Carroll	July 31, 2009
497	91	Murder: Stanley Gryziec. Wanted with Update: Joseph Prushinowski. Unexplained Death: Kenneth Engie. Medical Mystery with Update: Teryn Hedlund. Solved: Alex Cooper. Fraud with Update: Richard Condia	August 3, 2009
498	92	Wanted with Update: Lee Selwyn. Unexplained Death with Update: Bonnie Craig. Solved: David Gause. Murder: Matt Flores. Sci-Med: Fallon Cancer. Fraud with Update: Sweetheart Swindler	August 3, 2009
499	93	Abduction: Cynthia Anderson. Murder with Update: Cheryl Holland. The Unexplained: E.L.F. Solved: Angelo Desideri. Missing: Alejandro Espinosa	August 4, 2009
500	94	Final Appeal: Paul Ferrell. The Unexplained: Edgar Cayce. Murder with Update: Wil Hendrick. Lost Loves with Update: The Mother of Tim Harrell	August 4, 2009
501	95	Unexplained Death: Marilu Geri. The Unexplained: Teresita Basa. Solved: Savior of Phillip Macri. Treasure: Poverty Island Treasure. Wanted: Debbie. Legends with Update: Miracle the White Buffalo	August 5, 2009
502	96	Missing with Update: Michael Hughes. Abduction: Alicia Showalter Reynolds. Unexplained Death: Kurt Sova. Lost Loves with Update: Rose Marie Luttmer. Solved: Colleen Reed. The Unexplained: Michael Owen; Wendy Throop	August 5, 2009
503	97	Murder with Update: Camilla Lyman. UFO: Wytheville UFO Sightings. Lost Heirs with Update: Heirs of Dorothea Allen. Solved: Christopher Kurowski. Abduction: Marlene Santana	August 6, 2009
504	98	Murder: Anita Green. Robbery with Update: Matthew Chase. Ghosts: Woods Home. Missing: Jim Kimball. Solved: Nelson DeCloud. Unexplained Death: Stanton Bones	August 6, 2009
505	99	Wanted with Update: Grant Hendrickson and Michele Cartagena. Legends: Margaux Hemingway. Murder with Update: Don Henry and Kevin Ives. Unexplained Death: Gabby's Bones. Solved: Susan King. Lost Loves with Update: David, Norma, and Ernest Stallings	August 7, 2009
506	100	Escape with Update: Richard Cepulonis. The Unexplained: The Ice Man. Wanted: Juan Gil Ferrufino, Mario Portillo and German DeLeon. Investigators: G. Daniel Walker. Solved: Savior of Steve Newton. Murder: Little Miss Panasoffkee	August 7, 2009
507	101	Unexplained Death with Update: Michelle Witherell. Legends: The Wickenburg Massacre. Missing with Update: Patricia Carlton. Solved: The Sisters of Jackie Dragon. Wanted: Cowboy Bandit. Sci-Med: Life on Mars	August 10, 2009
508	102	Unexplained Death with Update: Huey Long. Wanted with Update: Joe Morrow. Sci-Med with Update: Santos Family. Solved: Lt. Karen Stephens. Lost Loves: Dolores Ford	August 10, 2009
509	103	Escape with Update: Steve Wilson. Murder: Lynn Amos. Amnesia with Update: Doreen Picard. Wanted: Brad Bishop. Solved: Kelli Ann Ayres. Sci-Med with Update: The Mona Lisa	August 11, 2009
510	104	Unexplained Death: Debbie Wolfe. Lost Loves with Update: Linda Sharp. Murder with Update: Bill Henderson. Wanted with Update: Joe Shepherd. The Unexplained: Michelle O'Malley. Solved: Jerry Strickland; Missy Munday	August 11, 2009
511	105	Final Appeal with Update: Steve Shores. The Unexplained: St. James Hotel. Unexplained Death: Crystal Spencer. Wanted with Update: David Gordon Smith	August 12, 2009
512	106	Unexplained Death: Rae Ann Mossor. Legends: Ogopogo. Investigators with Update: Dr. Emily Craig. Abduction with Update: Molly Bish. Treasure: Alamo Treasure. Wanted: Interstate 70 Killer	August 12, 2009
513	107	Missing: Tara Breckinridge. Escape with Update: Michael Mohon. Unexplained Death: Ralph Sigler. Murder with Update: Dan Short. Lost Loves with Update: Rose Marie	August 13, 2009
514	108	The Unexplained: Oakville Blobs. Missing: The Crew of the Freedon. Legends with Update: John Wilkes Booth. Solved: The Smoker Car Baby. Wanted with Update: Dorothy Donovan	August 13, 2009
515	109	Final Appeal with Update: Michael Martin. Murder: Sharon Kinne. The Unexplained: Charlene Richard. Wanted with Update: Salvatore Spinnato. Solved: Kevin Poulsen. Lost Loves with Update: Karen	August 14, 2009
516	110	Missing: John Cheek. Murder: Jay Cook and Tanya Van Cuylenborg. Lost Loves: The Crew of the L-8. Lost Loves with Update: The Siblings of Jim Boumgarden. Solved: Marilyn Hahnlein. Wanted: New Orleans Serial Killer	August 14, 2009
517	111	Investigators: Nancy Myer. Solved: Joe Shepherd. Abduction: Sabrina Aisenberg. Sci-Med: Victoria Doroshenko. Legends: Phantom Sub. Fraud with Update: Wade Mitchell Parker	August 17, 2009
518	112	Unexplained Death with Update: Bobby Fuller. Final Appeal with Update: Larry Race. The Unexplained: Pearl Curran. Lost Loves: The Sister of Lois Cappoziello. Solved: Linda Sharp	August 17, 2009
519	113	Robbery with Update: Luis Ochoa. Solved: Sam Wodke. Wanted with Update: Lyle Moody. Legends: Amelia Earhart. Unexplained Death: Norman Ladner	August 18, 2009
520	114	Missing with Update: Doreen Marfeo. Wanted: Richard Bocklage. Murder with Update: Janice and Alyssa Owen. The Unexplained: Father Solanus Casey. Lost Loves with Update: The Family of Dolores Camarena	August 18, 2009
521	115	Murder: Donald Smith. Abduction with Update: Kathy Hobbs. Sci-Med: Linda Tellington-Jones. Solved: Charita Harding. Wanted: Kevin Wheel. The Unexplained: Karen Walker	August 19, 2009
522	116	Wanted with Update: Reggie DePalma. Missing: Patricia Meehan. Murder with Update: Tracy Wofford-Bunn. Ghosts: Kelsay House. Solved: The Parents of Brenda Abbey. Wanted: Pedro Uribe	August 19, 2009
523	117	Wanted with Update: Arthur Lopez Jr.. The Unexplained: Marfa Lights. Murder: Marie Hilley. Missing: Cecilia Newball and Rene Perez Jr.. Solved: Saviors of Michele West	August 20, 2009
524	118	Wanted with Update: Rufino Castaneda. Solved: Elizabeth Ortiz. Murder: Jay Given. The Unexplained: Hank Jones; Dr. David Faux; Carol Montrose. Lost Loves with Update: Madeline and Ada Underwood. Lost Heirs: Heirs of Charles Lazarus	August 20, 2009
525	119	Murder: Kaitlyn Arquette. The Unexplained: Georgia Rudolph. Wanted with Update: Don Davis Jr.. Murder with Update: Don Henry and Kevin Ives. Legends with Update: Amelia Earhart	August 21, 2009
526	120	Unexplained Death: Russell Evans. Murder with Update: Danny Paquette. Missing: Pam Page. Solved: Sheldon Weinberg. Amnesia with Update: Gigi. Lost Loves with Update: The Sisters of Jackie Dragon	August 21, 2009
527	121	Legends: Boston Strangler. UFO: Vancouver Lights. Murder with Update: Roger Wheeler; Brian Halloran; John Callahan. Wanted: Dub Wackerhagen. Lost Heirs: Heirs of Walter Rice. Final Appeal with Update: Tony Miller	March 15, 2010
528	122	Missing: Angela Hammond. Treasure: Alamo Treasure. Wanted with Update: John Feiga. Fraud with Update: Gertrude Pruett. Solved: Annie Hearin. Murder with Update: Robert Weeks	March 15, 2010
529	123	Wanted with Update: William John Wood. Missing: Geoffrey Sullivan. The Unexplained: Robert Davidson. Murder: Jack Brown. Solved: Liz Carmichael. Lost Loves with Update: Amadeo Marcelo	March 16, 2010
530	124	Legends with Update: Anna Anderson. Wanted with Update: J. D. Method. Missing with Update: Dan Wilson. Lost Loves with Update: Kelli Ann Ayres	March 16, 2010
531	125	Murder with Update: Bobbi Oberholtzer and Annette Schnee. The Unexplained: Yefim Shubentsov. Missing: Niqui McCown. Wanted: William Fischer. Solved: The Children of Georgia Tann. Legends: Amazon Women	March 17, 2010
532	126	Unexplained Death: Charles Morgan. Arson with Update: Seattle Arsonist. Legends: The Curse of King Tut. Lost Heirs with Update: Lorene Roberts. Wanted with Update: Paul Ragusa. Lost Loves: Arthur Lloyd	March 17, 2010
533	127	Missing: The Crew of the Sarah Joe. The Unexplained: The Devil's Backbone. Murder with Update: Carson Prince. Fraud with Update: William Eugene Hilliard. Solved: Karen. Wanted: Cachimba	March 18, 2010
534	128	Unexplained Death with Update: Mario Amado. Missing: Elizabeth Campbell. Wanted with Update: Dr. Kenneth Frank. Solved: Kari Lynn Nixon. Lost Heirs: The Family of Pat Mealbach. Lost Loves: The Family of Monica Libao	March 18, 2010
535	129	Missing: Dale Kerstetter. Unexplained Death with Update: Kathy Bonderson. The Unexplained with Update: United Kingdom Crop Circles. Wanted with Update: Neil and Terry Gott. Sci-Med: Betty Landers; Lori Smith; The Father of Elizabeth Bersanetti	March 19, 2010
536	130	Murder with Update: Diana Robertson. Wanted with Update: Tim Barry. Legends with Update: The Skunk Ape. Missing: Keith Reinhard. Lost Loves: Alexander	March 19, 2010
537	131	Investigators with Update: Connecticut River Killer. Missing with Update: Bonnie Haim. Murder: Su-Ya Kim. Solved: Patricia Bonner. Lost Loves with Update: Melvin and Daniel Nellis. The Unexplained: Carolyn Hebert; Elaine Emmi; Linda Babb	March 22, 2010
538	132	Wanted with Update: John Lutter. Robbery: Harvey McCloud. Arson: Mabel Wood. Sci-Med with Update: Wally Spencer. Solved: John Martin. Lost Loves with Update: Michelle Fazzani	March 22, 2010
539	133	Unexplained Death with Update: Tom Kueter. Legends: Rudolf Hess. Solved: Ann Sigmin and Garey Goff. Wanted: Kenneth Dungee. Sci-Med: Chucky McGivern	March 23, 2010
540	134	Murder with Update: Jessica Keen. Escape with Update: Mark Adams. The Unexplained: Rosemary Altea. Missing: Curtis Pishon. Solved: Cheryl Holland. Lost Loves with Update: Jim Pearson	March 23, 2010
541	135	Robbery with Update: Patrick Michael Mitchell. Murder: Jean Ellroy. Miracles: Miracle of Lourdes. Lost Loves: Annie Currie	March 24, 2010
542	136	Final Appeal with Update: Tony Miller. Murder with Update: Ricardo Caputo. Treasure with Update: Victorio Peak Treasure. Solved: Eric Rudolph. Wanted: Lionel Luviano	March 24, 2010
543	137	Unexplained Death with Update: Steve Sandlin. UFO: Area 51. Missing with Update: Amy Billig. Murder with Update: The Signal Mountain Murders. Wanted with Update: Michael St. Clair and Dennis Reese	March 25, 2010
544	138	Wanted: Antonio Castro. Murder: Terri McClure. Unexplained Death: Andre Jones. Fraud: Woody Kelly. Missing: Charles Southern Jr.	March 25, 2010
545	139	Wanted with Update: David Kemp. Missing with Update: Susan Harrison. Treasure: Lunersee Lake Treasure. Murder with Update: Tracy Kirkpatrick. The Unexplained: John and Patti Eggleston	March 26, 2010
546	140	Missing: Lt. Paul Whipkey. Wanted: Burrowing Burglars. Murder with Update: Jorge Mendez and Jose Rios. Investigators: Noreen Renier. Lost Loves with Update: The Search of Bob Coleman	March 26, 2010
547	141	Murder: Joe Maloney. Missing: Kristen Modafferi. Wanted: Jenny Pratt. Solved: Rodger Lindsley. Lost Loves: Saviors of Doris Smith. Lost Heirs: Heirs of Walter Green	March 29, 2010
548	142	Wanted: Jesus Penalver. Unexplained Death: Ted Loseff. Missing with Update: Philip Taylor Kramer. Legends: Image of Guadalupe. Lost Loves with Update: Kimberly Karen. Solved: James White	March 29, 2010
549	143	Final Appeal: Michael Lloyd Self. Murder with Update: Anthrax Killer. Ghosts: Pawley's Island. Solved: Traci Kenley and Bill Rundle. Wanted: C.W. Roddy	March 30, 2010
550	144	Wanted with Update: Lissette Nukida. Murder: Rebecca Young. Unexplained Death with Update: Doris Duke. Solved: Bike Path Rapist. Fraud with Update: Raymond Young. Medical Mystery: Kristina Smith	March 30, 2010
551	145	Murder with Update: Ethel Kidd. Missing with Update: Judy Hyams. Miracles: Blinking Crucifix. Investigators: Roben Talton. Lost Loves: The Daughter of Oscar Norton	March 31, 2010
552	146	Murder with Update: Gregory Barker. Legends: Mary Celeste. Wanted with Update: Brian Brophil. Lost Loves with Update: Paul and Paula Scribner. Wanted with Update: David Gause. Solved: Lisa Marie Kimmell. Lost Loves with Update: The Family of Charles Stubin	March 31, 2010
553	147	Murder: Diana Shawcroft and Jennifer Lueth. Wanted with Update: David Freeman. Fraud: New York Coin Scam. Robbery: Epes Bandits. The Unexplained: Sonya Fitzpatrick. Lost Loves with Update: The Family of Georgia Boyd	April 1, 2010
554	148	Final Appeal: John Branion. Wanted: Las Cruces Bowling Alley Massacre. Murder with Update: Leo Koury. Lost Loves with Update: Saviors of Colleen Frangione. The Unexplained: Janie Halliday and Estela Vera's "Guardian Angels"	April 1, 2010
555	149	Unexplained Death: Michael Rosenblum. Murder: Ralph Probst. Solved: Avery Norris. Wanted: Sagebrush Rebellion. The Unexplained: Kathleen Burghardt; Eric Danowski	April 2, 2010
556	150	Final Appeal with Update: Johnny Lee Wilson. The Unexplained: Tatum House. Wanted with Update: Jerry Strickland; Missy Munday. Unexplained Death with Update: Paducah Plane Jumper	April 2, 2010
557	151	Wanted: Ohio Prostitute Killer. The Unexplained: Sharon Johnson. Unexplained Death: Aileen Conway. Sci-Med: Mia; Shadow. Lost Loves with Update: The Mother of Carla Downing	April 5, 2010
558	152	Murder with Update: Brook Baker. Missing: Charles Shelton. Wanted with Update: Beverly McGowan. Solved: Sweetheart Swindler. The Unexplained with Update: Georgia Rudolph	April 5, 2010
559	153	Wanted with Update: Stryder Styarfyr. Murder with Update: Roxann and Kristopher Jeeves. Miracles: The Fatima Miracle. Lost Loves: The Child of Mac McDonald. Wanted with Update: James Donald King	April 6, 2010
560	154	Murder: Rhonda Hinson. Ghosts: Myrtles Plantation. Wanted: Original Night Stalker. Sci-Med: Eugene Shoemaker and Virgil Sharpton. Lost Loves: Robert James Palmer. Solved: Savior of Wilma Drew	April 6, 2010
561	155	Missing: Anthonette Cayedito. Final Appeal: Jeffrey MacDonald. Lost Loves: Mary Agnes Gross	April 7, 2010
562	156	Arson: Clarence and Geneva Roberts. The Unexplained: Jessie Presley. Solved: Wanda Jean Mays. Unexplained Death: Katherine Korzilius. Wanted: Dr. Arvind Sinha. Missing with Update: Tim Molnar	April 7, 2010
563	157	Missing: Adam Hecht. Unexplained Death with Update: Glen and Bessie Hyde. The Unexplained: Dee Klepper; Gus Ortega. Wanted: Sal Guardado. Solved: Joan, Michelle and Christe Rogers. Robbery: Stahl Painting Theft	April 8, 2010
564	158	Murder with Update: Harold and Thelma Swain. Lost Loves with Update: Michelle Fazzani. The Unexplained: James Van Praagh. Solved: John Novotny. Wanted with Update: John Vogel	April 8, 2010
565	159	Murder with Update: Kevin Hughes. The Unexplained: Padre Pio. Solved: Saviors of Colleen Frangione. Missing with Update: Deborah Poe. Lost Loves with Update: Bill and Cynthia Zelinski	April 9, 2010
566	160	Unexplained Death: Chad Maurer. Wanted: Robert Fisher. Legends: Agatha Christie. Solved: The Friends of Fritz Vincken	April 9, 2010
567	161	Wanted with Update: Travis Wade Duncan. Wanted with Update: Gretchen Burford. Abduction with Update: Annie Hearin. Amnesia: Kyra Cook. Unexplained Death: Scott Johnson	April 12, 2010
568	162	Wanted: Lester Garnier. Missing: Morgan Nick; Jacqueline Castaneda. The Unexplained: Joe McCarthy; Herman Stegos; Michael Landon. Solved: Pizza Restaurant Robbers. Murder with Update: Lucie Turmel. Lost Loves with Update: Savior of Cathy Loving	April 12, 2010
569	163	Murder: Father Reynaldo Rivera; Father John Kerrigan. Missing: Laurence Harding Jr.. Wanted with Update: Kathy Power. Sci-Med: Master Hong Liu. Murder with Update: Matthew Chase. Lost Loves with Update: The Friend of Moises Treves	April 13, 2010
570	164	Final Appeal with Update: Luis Diaz. Arson with Update: Jordan Children. Abduction with Update: The Children of Georgia Tann. Missing with Update: Frank Bloomer	April 13, 2010
571	165	Wanted: Donald Eugene Webb. Missing with Update: Trisha Autry. Sci-Med: Jessica Constant; Albert Wong. Murder with Update: David Viera. Solved: Kathleen Mary Young. Lost Heirs with Update: Heirs of Katherine Bennett	April 14, 2010
572	166	Murder: Permon Gilbert. Wanted with Update: Frank Montenegro. Legends: Charles Nungesser and François Coli. Murder: Hazel Head. Solved: Martha Hinkle. Lost Loves with Update: Sylvan Lazarus, Carl Cobb and Bernard Brady	April 14, 2010
573	167	Unexplained Death with Update: Kay Hall. Wanted: Televangelist Bomber. Sci-Med: Trisha Zemba. The Unexplained: Katie. Lost Loves with Update: Mother of Barbara Smith and Barbara Ratner	April 15, 2010
574	168	Wanted: Michael Hunter. Missing with Update: Amber Swartz. Fraud with Update: Carlos Garcia. Murder with Update: Joyce McLain. The Unexplained: Bruce and Rosa. Lost Loves with Update: Rodger Lindsley	April 15, 2010
575	169	Legends: Robert Kennedy. The Unexplained: Gurdon Light. Lost Loves with Update: The Siblings of Tina Shiets. Abduction with Update: Le-Zhan Williams. Sci-Med: Duane Pickel	April 16, 2010
576	170	Final Appeal with Update: Jeanine Nicarico. The Unexplained: Norman; Lulu. Amnesia with Update: Sandra Evans. Wanted: Brayman Road Attacker. Lost Loves with Update: The Parents of Miriam	April 16, 2010
577	171	Murder: Lisa Ziegert. Missing with Update: Shannon Verhage. Amnesia: Lucy. Unexplained Death with Update: Sandra Orellana. Lost Loves with Update: Dylene Zolikoff, Scott Merz and Dawnette Barker. Sci-Med: Philip Pauli	April 19, 2010
578	172	Wanted with Update: Maria Armstrong. Murder: Gus Hoffman. Treasure: Beale's Treasure. Lost Loves with Update: Angeline Dewey. The Unexplained: Luiz Gasparetto	April 19, 2010
579	173	Final Appeal: Glenn Consagra. Missing: Selena Edon. The Unexplained: The Bible Code. Solved: Charles Mule. Sci-Med: Kelly Ames. Lost Loves with Update: Kathleen Mary Young	April 26, 2010
580	174	Sci-Med: Carolyn Reynolds. Missing: Jeremy Bright. The Unexplained: Chase Bowman; Liia Rudolph; Blake Hocken. Solved: The Mother of Carla Downing. Wanted: Gloria Schulze. Lost Loves with Update: Heath Brian Vess	April 26, 2010
581	175	Escape: William Jordan. Wanted with Update: John Burns. Murder: Charlie Anderson. Lost Loves with Update: Lorene Roberts. Solved: Bill and Cynthia Zelinski. The Unexplained with Update: Audrey Santo	April 27, 2010

=== Season 15 (2020) ===
No. overall	No. in season	Mystery	Directed by	Original release date
Volume 1
582	1	Mystery on the Rooftop	Marcus A. Clarke	July 1, 2020
583	2	13 Minutes	Jimmy Goldblum	July 1, 2020
584	3	House of Terror	Clay Jeter	July 1, 2020
585	4	No Ride Home	Marcus A. Clarke	July 1, 2020
586	5	Berkshires UFO	Marcus A. Clarke	July 1, 2020
587	6	Missing Witness	Clay Jeter	July 1, 2020
Volume 2
588	7	Washington Insider Murder	Dan Argott	October 19, 2020
589	8	Death in Oslo	Robert M. Wise	October 19, 2020
590	9	Death Row Fugitive	Robert M. Wise & Clay Jeter	October 19, 2020
591	10	Tsunami Spirits	Clay Jeter	October 19, 2020
592	11	Lady in the Lake	Skye Borgman	October 19, 2020
593	12	Stolen Kids	Jessica Dimmock	October 19, 2020

=== Season 16 (2022) ===
No. overall	No. in season	Mystery	Directed by	Original release date
Volume 3
594	1	Mystery at Mile Marker 45	Skye Borgman	October 18, 2022
595	2	Something in the Sky	Gabe Torres	October 18, 2022
596	3	Body in Bags	Donnie Eichar	October 18, 2022
597	4	Death in a Vegas Motel	Skye Borgman	October 25, 2022
598	5	Paranormal Rangers	Clay Jeter	October 25, 2022
599	6	What Happened to Josh?	Gabe Torres	October 25, 2022
600	7	Body in the Bay	Robert M. Wise	November 1, 2022
601	8	The Ghost in Apartment 14	Clay Jeter	November 1, 2022
602	9	Abducted by a Parent	Joie Jacoby	November 1, 2022

=== Season 17 (2024) ===
No. overall	No. in season	Mystery	Directed by	Original release date
Volume 4
603	1	Who Was Jack the Ripper?	Robert M. Wise	July 31, 2024
604	2	Body in the Basement	Gabe Torres	July 31, 2024
605	3	The Severed Head	Skye Borgman	July 31, 2024
606	4	Murder, Center Stage	Robert M. Wise	July 31, 2024
607	5	The Mothman Revisited	Gabe Torres	July 31, 2024
Volume 5
608	6	Park Bench Murders	Skye Borgman	October 2, 2024
609	7	My Paranormal Partner	Robert M. Wise	October 2, 2024
610	8	Mysterious Mutilations	Robert M. Wise	October 2, 2024
611	9	The Roswell UFO Incident	Gabe Torres	October 2, 2024

=== Unmasking the Tylenol Killer (2026) ===
Unsolved Mysteries' first-ever feature-length documentary, Unmasking the Tylenol Killer, premiered on The Roku Channel on October 9, 2026. This 88-minute film details the resolution of the Boise, Idaho cold case of the "Unknown Wanderer" (identified as Dr. Mathew Francis Betkouski in September 2026), which was featured on a 1990 episode of the show, and explores a possible connection to the unsolved 1982 Chicago Tylenol murders.
