= Michael Sabo =

Michael Sabo (born 1944/1945) is an American consultant and speaker on identity theft and fraud in the business and personal sectors. He is executive director of Prison Consultants of America, a resource for individuals charged with white-collar crime. Sabo was a longtime con artist and forger who was released from prison in 2009.

== Biography ==
Sabo grew up in McKeesport, Pennsylvania, where he played high school football. He also earned credit toward a college degree while in the U.S. Army.

Before 2009, Sabo was best known for his history as a check, stocks and bonds forger, a master impostor, and as an escaped fugitive from federal custody. He became notorious in the 1970s and throughout the 1980s for successfully forging bank and government checks, as well as the forgery of stock and bond certificates.

By 1992, Sabo had been convicted of bank fraud, forgery of stocks and bonds, grand larceny, and identity theft, both in federal and state courts.

In 2009, Sabo was sentenced to a year in prison for impersonating an official from the Internal Revenue Service from 2004 to 2005. Sabo owed approximately $95,000 in federal income tax from 1994 to 1998, and the IRS placed tax liens on his property to force repayment. He fraudulently signed releases on the liens by pretending to be an IRS agent.

He has served a total of 14 years in federal and state prisons. He also had extensive plastic surgery performed while he was a fugitive.
