= Disappearance of the Sarah Joe =

1979 disappearance of a Hawaiian fishing boat and its crew

- Date: 11 February 1979
- Location: Off Maui, Hawaii
- Type: Maritime disappearance
- Participants: Benjamin Kalama, Scott Moorman, Patrick Woessner, Peter Hanchett, and Ralph Malaiakini
- Outcome: Boat discovered in 1988 on Taongi Atoll, Marshall Islands; remains of one crew member recovered

The disappearance of the Sarah Joe was a maritime mystery involving a 17-foot Boston Whaler fishing boat and its five-man crew, who disappeared off the coast of Maui in Hawaii on 11 February 1979. After an extensive search failed to locate the vessel, the case remained unsolved for nearly a decade. In 1988, the boat was discovered on the uninhabited Taongi Atoll in the Marshall Islands, 2,054 miles (3,306 km) from Maui, alongside a grave containing the remains of one crew member.

The circumstances surrounding the fate of the crew and the burial of one of the victims remain unexplained, and the case has been described as one of Hawaii's most enduring maritime mysteries.

== Disappearance ==
On 11 February 1979, five friends from the Hāna area of Maui departed on a fishing trip aboard the Sarah Joe, (Note: Also spelled Sara Joe.) a 17-foot Boston Whaler powered by an outboard motor. The crew consisted of Benjamin Kalama, Scott Moorman, Patrick Woessner, Peter Hanchett, and Ralph Malaiakini. Weather conditions were initially calm, but a severe storm developed later in the day. The men failed to return to shore, and were last heard from four hours after they departed, sending a message by radio that their engine had died. A search was launched involving the United States Coast Guard, military aircraft, private boats, and volunteers, but despite covering 56,000 square miles of ocean, the search found no trace of either the boat or its occupants.

== Discovery of the vessel ==
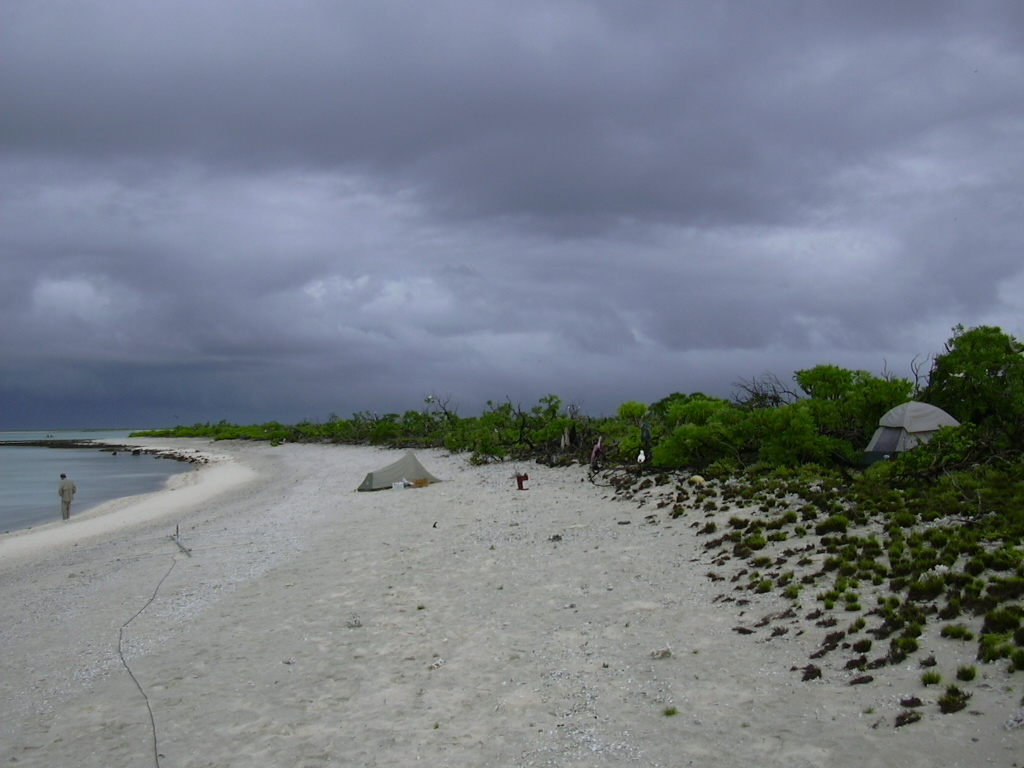
Lagoon shoreline at Sibylla Island.

In September 1988, marine biologist John Naughton, who had participated in the original search effort, discovered a wrecked boat on Sibylla Island, Taongi Atoll in the Marshall Islands while conducting wildlife surveys. The vessel was identified as the Sarah Joe through its registration and engine numbers. Investigators also discovered a shallow grave marked with a driftwood cross. Human remains recovered from the grave were subsequently identified as those of crew member Scott Moorman through dental records.

No remains belonging to the other four crew members were ever located.

== Investigation and theories ==
The discovery of both the boat and Moorman's grave raised new questions about the fate of the crew. Investigators concluded that wind and ocean currents could plausibly have carried the Sarah Joe from Hawaii to the Marshall Islands. However, the circumstances of Moorman's burial have never been fully explained. The grave appeared to have been deliberately constructed, leading to speculation that unknown individuals may have discovered the remains and buried them. Private investigator Steve Goodenow later suggested that Chinese fishermen illegally operating in the area may have found and buried the body without reporting it to authorities.

No evidence has ever conclusively established how long any of the crew survived after the boat disappeared, whether any reached land alive, or what became of the remaining four men.

== Legacy ==
The mystery attracted national attention in the United States and was later featured on the television series Unsolved Mysteries. The disappearance of the Sarah Joe continues to be cited as one of the most unusual unsolved maritime mysteries in the Pacific Ocean.

Memorial services have been held in Hāna to commemorate the five fishermen, and memorial plaques were installed in both Hāna and Taongi Atoll.
