= List of people who disappeared mysteriously (1980s) =

This is a list of people who disappeared mysteriously: 1980s or whose deaths or exact circumstances thereof are not substantiated. Many people who disappear end up declared presumed dead and some of these people were possibly subjected to forced disappearance.

This list is a general catch-all; for specialty lists, see Lists of people who disappeared.

== 1980 ==
Date	Person(s)	Age when disappeared	Missing from	Circumstances	Refs.
11 April 1980	V. V. Sadagopan	65	Andhra Pradesh, India	Veeravanallur Vedantam Sadagopan who went by "V. V. Sadagopan" was an Indian composer, performer, music teacher, film actor, Indian Civil Service aspirant, and university rank-holder who disappeared in Andhra Pradesh on 11 April 1980 and was never seen again.	
26 April 1980	Louise Faulkner	43	St Kilda, Australia	Louise Faulkner and her daughter Charmian went missing in April 1980 after Louise told a friend she was visiting her boyfriend in Gippsland. They were last seen getting into a white ute. Both were declared legally dead in 2006 at an inquest. No trace of them has been found.	
26 April 1980	Charmian Faulkner	2	St Kilda, Australia	Louise Faulkner and her daughter Charmian went missing in April 1980 after Louise told a friend she was visiting her boyfriend in Gippsland. They were last seen getting into a white ute. Both were declared legally dead in 2006 at an inquest. No trace of them has been found.	
26 April 1980	Laureen Rahn	14	Manchester, New Hampshire, U.S.	Fourteen-year-old Rahn disappeared from her apartment after spending an evening with two friends. Upon returning home in the early morning, her mother noticed the lightbulbs in the hallways of each floor in the apartment building had been unscrewed, leaving the halls dark. Upon entering the apartment, she saw the figure of a young girl in Rahn's bed, and assumed the figure was Rahn. However, several hours later, she discovered that she was in fact Rahn's friend, who had fallen asleep in the bed. Her friend claimed to have last seen Rahn during the night when she got up to go to sleep on the couch. In the years after Rahn's disappearance, her mother received various anonymous phone calls, several of which were traced to motels in Southern California.	
27 April 1980	Nicolas Jaeger	34	Lhotse Shar, Nepal	Jaeger, a French physician and alpinist, disappeared on 27 April 1980 while attempting to climb the Lhotse Shar in Nepal and is presumed dead, his body having never been found.	
May or June 1980	Kaoru Matsuki	25–26	Madrid, Spain	Matsuki was an exchange student who was starting his studies in Madrid while Ishioka was a traveler who were abducted to North Korea by Japanese North Korean sympathizers, both of which have since been issued arrest warrants by the Japanese Government. North Korea has claimed that both individuals have since died, but their claim has not been substantiated.	
May or June 1980	Tohru Ishioka	22–23	Madrid, Spain	Matsuki was an exchange student who was starting his studies in Madrid while Ishioka was a traveler who were abducted to North Korea by Japanese North Korean sympathizers, both of which have since been issued arrest warrants by the Japanese Government. North Korea has claimed that both individuals have since died, but their claim has not been substantiated.	
June 1980	Tadaaki Hara	43	Miyazaki Prefecture, Japan	Hara was kidnapped by North Korean agent Sin Gwang-Su and South Korean Kim Kil Uk, who had lured him from Osaka to Miyazaki with a job offer in June 1980. Hara has not been seen since, and Sin has used Hara's identity to obtain a Japanese passport.	
17 June 1980	Peng Jiamu	55	Lop Nur, China	Chinese biochemist and explorer Peng, who led an expedition to Lop Nur, disappeared after leaving a note saying he had gone to find water. He is presumed dead; a number of attempts have been made to find his remains, but nothing has ever been found.	
28 July 1980	John Favara	51	New York City, New York, U.S.	John Favara was the backyard neighbor of Gambino crime boss John Gotti, in Howard Beach, New York, who disappeared on 28 July 1980, over four months after he struck and killed Gotti's 12-year-old son, Frank, with his car on 4 March, as the boy darted into the street on a motorized minibike. After the killing, Favara's wife and two sons moved out of Howard Beach; John was declared legally dead in 1983.	
8 August 1980	Alan Addis	19	North Arm, Falkland Islands	Alan Addis, a British Royal Marine stationed in the Falkland Islands, was part of a three-man team that had journeyed to the remote settlement of North Arm in Lafonia on East Falkland to pick up three other Royal Marines and equipment. On the evening of 8 August, Addis and the other marines attended a function in the village hall along with forty locals. The marines left the event at different times to various local homes, and Addis's colleagues reported last seeing him at around 1:30 am. Authorities initially believed Addis had possibly drowned, but several local men were later arrested for his murder, but subsequently released.	
16 August 1980	Randy Sellers	17	Visalia, Kentucky, U.S.	Randy Sellers disappeared on 16 August 1980 after police dropped him a mile from his house, following an incident at a county fair. In the early 1990s, incarcerated serial killer Donald Leroy Evans made a string of confessions to murders, including Sellers's, but Evans' confession has not been substantiated. Attention has also focused on the two officers who last saw Sellers.	
6 October 1980	Thomas A. Mutch	49	Mount Nun, India	The American geologist and planetary scientist disappeared on 6 October 1980 during a descent from Mount Nun in the Kashmir Himalayas and is believed to be dead.	
16 October 1980	Irma Flaquer	42	Guatemala	Flaquer, a Guatemalan psychologist and reporter, was abducted and presumably executed by government agents for perceived anti-government activities.	
7 November 1980	Johan Asplund	11	Sundsvall, Sweden	Asplund disappeared from his home in Sundsvall during the morning of 7 November 1980 and has not been seen since.	
9 or 19 December 1980	Alaíde Foppa	66	Guatemala City, Guatemala	Guatemalan poet and educator Foppa was detained and disappeared on 19 December 1980 and is believed to have been murdered.	

== 1981 ==
Date	Person(s)	Age when disappeared	Missing from	Circumstances	Refs.
5 November 1981	Kathryn Gregory	24	Spokane, Washington, U.S.	Gregory, a 24-year-old nurse, disappeared on 5 November 1981 from a parking lot in Spokane's South Hills. Her car was found parked two blocks away from where she was last seen; foul play is suspected.	
c. 26 November 1981	Denise Beaudin	22	Manchester, New Hampshire, U.S.	Suspected victim of Terry Peder Rasmussen, whom Beaudin had previously dated. Beaudin is believed to have been killed somewhere in California, although her body has never been found.	
28 November 1981	Katrice Lee	2	Schloß Neuhaus, West Germany	Lee was a British girl who disappeared from a NAAFI shopping complex on 28 November 1981, her second birthday.	
December 1981	George Washington Hughes	81–85	Florida, U.S.	George Washington "Bo" Hughes was a carver of hobo nickels until he disappeared from a hobo camp.	

== 1982 ==
Date	Person(s)	Age when disappeared	Missing from	Circumstances	Refs.
5 July 1982	Raquel Lipsky Prada	3	Cali, Colombia	Lipsky Prada disappeared from the Centro Administrativo Municipal (CAM) in Cali on 5 July 1982. She was visiting the municipal complex with her parents and older sister when an unidentified woman approached the children and asked the older sister to ask their mother whether she wanted chontaduro, a local fruit. When the family returned moments later, Raquel and the woman were gone. Raquel has never been located	
5 July 1982	Ahmad Motevaselian	29	Near Beirut, Lebanon	These four Iranian diplomats disappeared in Lebanon on 5 July 1982. On that date, when the vehicle carrying the diplomats was passing through a checkpoint on its way to Beirut, it was intercepted by Phalange Party members. Three decades after the incident, the fate of the missing diplomats remains a mystery, and the search for the Iranian diplomats continues.	
5 July 1982	Seyed Mohsen Mousavi	Unknown	Near Beirut, Lebanon	These four Iranian diplomats disappeared in Lebanon on 5 July 1982. On that date, when the vehicle carrying the diplomats was passing through a checkpoint on its way to Beirut, it was intercepted by Phalange Party members. Three decades after the incident, the fate of the missing diplomats remains a mystery, and the search for the Iranian diplomats continues.	
5 July 1982	Kazem Akhavan	Unknown	Near Beirut, Lebanon	These four Iranian diplomats disappeared in Lebanon on 5 July 1982. On that date, when the vehicle carrying the diplomats was passing through a checkpoint on its way to Beirut, it was intercepted by Phalange Party members. Three decades after the incident, the fate of the missing diplomats remains a mystery, and the search for the Iranian diplomats continues.	
5 July 1982	Taghi Rastegar Moghadam	Unknown	Near Beirut, Lebanon	These four Iranian diplomats disappeared in Lebanon on 5 July 1982. On that date, when the vehicle carrying the diplomats was passing through a checkpoint on its way to Beirut, it was intercepted by Phalange Party members. Three decades after the incident, the fate of the missing diplomats remains a mystery, and the search for the Iranian diplomats continues.	
5 September 1982	Johnny Gosch	12	Des Moines, Iowa, U.S.	Gosch was reported missing by his parents after he disappeared on 5 September 1982, while delivering newspapers. At that time, the custom was a three-day waiting period before police responded to missing-persons reports. Gosch was not heard from again, but his case prompted new laws for Iowa and other states resulting in missing-persons reports involving children being given immediate attention.	
12 September 1982	Steven Pearsall	35	Lewiston, Idaho, U.S.	On the night of 12 September 1982, Pearsall, an employee of the Lewiston Civic Theater, entered the building to use the laundry facilities and has not been seen since. His disappearance occurred on the same night as that of two women he was acquainted with, Kristina Diane Nelson and Jacqueline Ann "Brandy" Miller. Nelson and Miller were later found dead. Police believe Pearsall may have been a victim of the same killer.	
3 November 1982	Tony Jones	20	North Queensland, Australia	Tony Jones disappeared while backpacking on 3 November 1982, and is believed to have been murdered.	
24 November 1982	Gwendolyn Clemons	23	Kansas City, Missouri, U.S.	Clemons disappeared from Kansas City on 24 November 1982 along with her daughter and an unnamed man, apparently to "start a new life" in Florida. On 3 December 1982, Clemons was seen walking on a bridge above the Escatawpa River on Interstate 10, near the Alabama/Mississippi border with her daughter, appearing distressed. When passing motorists tried to assist her, she refused any help. A motorist reported seeing the body of a woman, floating in the river on 5 December, however, when authorities responded, they found the body of her daughter instead. Subsequent searches did not find Clemons, however did uncover the body of another unidentified man, who was most likely unrelated to the case. Authorities still consider Clemons a missing person, but believe she is deceased.	
c. 1982	Don Taxay	c. 43	India	American numismatist and historian Don Taxay was last seen in 1982.	

== 1983 ==
Date	Person(s)	Age when disappeared	Missing from	Circumstances	Refs.
20 January 1983	Tania Murrell	6	Edmonton, Alberta, Canada	Murrell was a six-year-old girl who lived in the city of Edmonton, Alberta. She disappeared while walking two blocks from her school to her home for lunch. Despite intense searches, there were no leads in her disappearance and she was never seen again.	
13 February 1983	Upali Wijewardene	44	Colombo, Sri Lanka	Sri Lankan business magnate Upali Wijewardene's private Lear jet disappeared en route to Colombo on 13 February 1983. An extensive search operation by air and naval units failed to locate any evidence of a crash; his plane disappeared without a trace, and he is believed to be dead.	
17 March 1983	Ludovic Janvier	6	Grenoble, France	Janvier disappeared on 17 March 1983 when he was believed to have been abducted along with his brothers by an unidentified white man. While his brothers escaped, Ludovic has not been located.	
7 May 1983	Mirella Gregori	15	Rome, Italy	Gregori disappeared from Rome on 7 May 1983 and has not been seen since.	
June 1983	Keiko Arimoto	23	London, England	Arimoto was a Japanese exchange student who was lured by Megumi Yao (wife of one of the hijackers of JAL 351 in 1970), claiming to offer a job opportunity, before disappearing. She was later determined to have been abducted by North Korean agents. North Korea has claimed that Arimoto died in 1988 with her husband Tohru Ishioka, another abduction victim, but the claim is not substantiated.	
1 June 1983	Ann Gotlib	12	Louisville, Kentucky, U.S.	Russian immigrant Gotlib disappeared from the premises of a shopping mall on 1 June 1983. The police later found her bike, but her abductor has remained a mystery.	
22 June 1983	Emanuela Orlandi	15	Rome, Italy	Orlandi, who was a citizen of Vatican City, disappeared on 22 June 1983 and has not been seen since.	
25 June 1983	Nyleen Kay Marshall	4	Helena, Montana, U.S.	On 25 June 1983 in the Helena National Forest, four-year-old Nyleen Marshall disappeared from a large family picnic. Some children with whom she was playing claimed to have seen her talking to an unknown man in a jogging suit. In the years after Marshall's disappearance, an anonymous person placed phone calls and wrote letters to missing-person nonprofits, as well as to the Marshall family, detailing his apparent kidnapping of Marshall. The unknown writer/caller was traced to Wisconsin, and he claimed Marshall was alive and well, though some content of his letters indicated sexual abuse. The identity of the letter writer and caller remain unknown, as does Marshall's whereabouts.	
6 July 1983	Tammy Lynn Leppert	18	Rockledge, Florida, U.S.	Model and actress Tammy Lynn Leppert disappeared on 6 July 1983 without a trace after leaving her family home.	
1 September 1983	Kirsa Jensen	14	Napier, New Zealand	Kirsa Jensen disappeared on 1 September 1983 while riding her horse at a beach.	
2 September 1983	George Cogar	50–51	British Columbia, Canada	The American computer scientist was last seen on 2 September 1983 aboard a private plane, a Britten-Norman Islander, with six other people to go on a hunting trip. The plane disappeared somewhere in British Columbia and was never found.	
26 October 1983	Sondra Kay Ramber	14	Santa Fe, Texas, U.S.	14-year-old Sondra Kay Ramber disappeared in Santa Fe, Texas, on 26 October 1983, having last been seen at her family's home. The front door was left open, food was left in the oven, and Ramber's purse and coat were still in the house. It was initially believed that Ramber had gone to the store, though she never returned home.	

== 1984 ==
Date	Person(s)	Age when disappeared	Missing from	Circumstances	Refs.
c. 1984	Baalu Girma	45	Addis Ababa, Ethiopia	Girma, an Ethiopian journalist and critic of the Derg, was presumably abducted and killed outside the capital, but his body has never been located.	
10 February 1984	Kevin Andrew Collins	10	San Francisco, California, U.S.	Collins disappeared while en route to basketball practice. He was one of the first children to be featured on milk cartons and the cover of national publications.	
13 February 1984	Naomi Uemura	43	Denali, Alaska, U.S.	Naomi Uemura, a Japanese adventurer who was particularly well known for doing alone what had previously been achieved only with large teams, disappeared on 13 February 1984 while descending Denali after a solo climb.	
21 April 1984	Hristo Prodanov	41	Mount Everest, Nepal	Prodanov, a Bulgarian mountaineer and the first Bulgarian to climb Mount Everest, disappeared on 21 April 1984 after descending the mountain the previous night. He was last heard from reporting that he had lost his gloves and is believed to have died.	
20 July 1984	John Patrick Kerrigan	58	Ronan, Montana, U.S.	Kerrigan, a Roman Catholic priest, was last seen at a bakery in Ronan. His bloodied clothing and a blood-stained coat hanger was found along Flathead Lake days later. His vehicle was discovered shortly after, containing USD $1,200, along with a blood-stained pillowcase and shovel. Kerrigan was later implicated, along with 80 others, in sexual abuse of minors by the Roman Catholic Diocese of Helena. His remains have never been found.	
22 July 1984	Curtis Holmen	31	Missoula, Montana, U.S.	Curtis Holmen, a schoolteacher in Missoula, disappeared and was never seen again. His case remains unsolved.	
20 August 1984	Françoise Bruyère	22	Mâcon, France	22-year-old cousins Françoise Bruyère and Marie-Agnès Cordonnier were last seen on 20 August 1984 trying to hitchhike from Mâcon to Aix-les-Bains. They were never found. Bruyère and Cordonnier are both believed to be victims of the A6 disappearances.	
20 August 1984	Marie-Agnès Cordonnier	22	Mâcon, France	22-year-old cousins Françoise Bruyère and Marie-Agnès Cordonnier were last seen on 20 August 1984 trying to hitchhike from Mâcon to Aix-les-Bains. They were never found. Bruyère and Cordonnier are both believed to be victims of the A6 disappearances.	
13 November 1984	Tammy Belanger	8	Exeter, New Hampshire, U.S.	Tammy Belanger, an eight-year-old third-grade student, disappeared while walking from her home to the nearby elementary school. Police believe she was abducted; the one suspect in the case was never charged in connection with Belanger's disappearance, and he died in December 2012.	
23 December 1984	Ayakannu Marithamuthu	33–34	Changi, Singapore	Ayakannu Marithamuthu was a Singaporean caretaker who was allegedly murdered on 23 December 1984. His body has never been found, and speculation remains his body was cooked into a curry before being disposed of in garbage containers. Six individuals were later charged with Ayakannu's murder, but were released on the day of the trial due to lack of evidence.	
1984	Ronald Jorgensen	Unknown	Remuera, New Zealand	Jorgensen, a New Zealand criminal on parole after completing a prison sentence, vanished in mysterious circumstances in 1984 after his car was found wrecked at the bottom of a cliff. Police initially suspected he faked his death, but he was declared legally dead in 1998. Since his body was never found, rumors persisted that he became a police informant in Australia.	

== 1985 ==
Date	Person(s)	Age when disappeared	Missing from	Circumstances	Refs.
4–5 January 1985	Boris Weisfeiler	43	Biobío Region, Chile	American mathematician Weisfeiler disappeared during a solo hiking trip in 1985. Chilean authorities originally concluded that he drowned, but documents released by the U.S. Department of State in 2000 included a 1986 memo suggesting he may be a captive "somewhere in Chile (probably Colonia Dignidad)", and a 1987 account by a CIA source claiming that Weisfeiler had been interrogated and fatally beaten by a Chilean army patrol.	
22 February 1985	Cherrie Mahan	8	Cabot, Pennsylvania, U.S.	Mahan was last seen getting off her school bus a short distance from her house on 22 February 1985. Police focused on a van seen near the bus when she got off. Her face was the first to be put on mailers sent all around the country, a practice continued with age-progressed photos as time passed. She was declared legally dead in 1998. In 2011, police claimed they had received a promising new lead but would not discuss it.	
28 March 1985	Sarkis Zeitlian	54–55	Beirut, Lebanon	Unger Sarkis Zeitlian was a Lebanese American journalist and political leader of the Armenian Revolutionary Federation (ARF) who was abducted in Beirut on 28 March 1985 and presumably murdered under unknown circumstances.	
31 March 1985	Vladimir Alexandrov	46	Madrid, Spain	Alexandrov, a Soviet physicist, disappeared on 31 March 1985 while attending a nuclear winter conference.	
8 June 1985	Marco Aurélio Sion	15	Piquete, Brazil	Marco Aurélio, a Brazilian boy scout who disappeared while climbing a hill in the mountains of the state of São Paulo on 8 june 1985.	
c. 6 July 1985	Andrew Fluegelman	41	San Francisco, California, U.S.	Fluegelman, a publisher, photographer, programmer, and attorney, disappeared on 6 July 1985, and is believed to have died by suicide after his car was found abandoned at the north end of the Golden Gate Bridge.	
6 July 1985	Diane Suzuki	19	Honolulu, Hawaii, U.S.	Suzuki was last seen on the evening of 6 July 1985 after leaving a dance studio where she worked as an instructor. Blood evidence found at the scene has not been matched to any suspect, nor can it be matched to Suzuki, since her blood type was not known. A photographer she knew was questioned by police and released without charge.	
30 July 1985	Nicole Morin	8	Toronto, Canada	Morin disappeared from the Etobicoke borough after leaving her apartment to go on a swim date with a friend. While her case is now considered cold, it is still under investigation by local police and missing child organizations.	
5 October 1985	Michelle Doherty Thomas	17	Santa Fe, Texas, U.S.	17-year-old Michelle Doherty Thomas was last seen leaving her family home in Santa Fe, Texas on 5 October 1985, after returning from work at a Galveston, Texas gas station. She left to meet with friends at a nearby nightclub on Galveston Island. Acquaintances claimed they stopped at a convenience store on the way to the nightclub and Michelle entered a vehicle with two men. She has not been seen since. Authorities believe that she may have been abducted and murdered.	
15 October 1985	Cotah Ramaswami	89	Chennai, India	Cotah Ramaswami, an Indian cricketer who played in two test matches in 1936, walked out of his home on 15 October 1985 and was never seen again.	
27 November 1985	Martha Jean Lambert	12	St. Augustine, Florida, U.S.	Lambert was a girl who went missing on 27 November 1985. She has never been seen again and foul play is highly suspected in the case.	

== 1986 ==
Date	Person(s)	Age when disappeared	Missing from	Circumstances	Refs.
February 1986	Madame Max Adolphe	60	Haiti	Adolphe, who was the right-hand woman of former Haitian president François Duvalier, was held prisoner in an army barracks next to the national palace in Haiti following Duvalier's overthrow, and left the country in February 1986. Her current whereabouts are unknown.	
2 March 1986	Kevin Hicks	16	London, England	An English schoolboy who disappeared from walking home from a local shop in Addiscombe, Croydon, on 2 March 1986. He is strongly believed to have been murdered.	
6 April 1986	Anthonette Cayedito	9	Gallup, New Mexico, U.S.	American girl Anthonette Cayedito disappeared from her home in the early-morning hours of 6 April 1986. Her mother went to look for her, but she could not be found.	
15 April 1986	Hana Gaddafi	5 months	Libya	The adopted daughter of Muammar Gaddafi, Hana Gaddafi is alleged to have died in the 1986 United States bombing of Libya; however, claims of her death in these bombings are disputed, with allegations including her having survived the raid and subsequently becoming a doctor as an adult, and of her mother fleeing to Algeria with her and her siblings, remaining.	
19 April 1986	Tammie Anne McCormick	13	Saratoga Springs, New York, U.S.	McCormick was last seen alive by her sister, whom she told she would hitchhike to school. She never arrived at her destination. Although McCormick had informed school friends of her intent to run away to Florida, she did not take any personal belongings, and was wearing boots she had complained were uncomfortable. It is believed McCormick met with foul play; investigators considered two individuals as suspects in the case: Firstly, convicted child murderer, Lewis Stephen Lent Jr; then in 2011 police named Arthur Mason Slaybaugh, who died in 2001, as a person of interest in the case.	
14 May 1986	Toh Hong Huat	12	Singapore	Two students of Owen Primary School, best friends Keh Chin Ann and Toh Hong Huat, both 12 years old, went missing on 14 May 1986. Chin Ann, the youngest of three children and the only son of his family, was last seen by a classmate running out of school to buy something after passing his bag to him. Hong Huat, the only child of a single-parent family, was last seen by his mother going out of the house to go to school, saying that Chin Ann came to fetch him to go to school together (which took place after Chin Ann went out of school). The boys were generally well-behaved and had never played truant before, according to their families. Their case became known as the "McDonald's Boys Case" as the fast food chain McDonald's offered a hefty S$100,000 reward for any information of the boys' whereabouts.	
14 May 1986	Keh Chin Ann	12	Singapore		
25 June 1986	Juan Pedro Martínez	10	Spain	Martínez, the ten-year-old son of a tank truck driver, mysteriously disappeared after his father's truck overturned in the Somosierra mountain pass and spilled its cargo of over 20,000 litres of sulphuric acid, resulting in deaths of his parents. However, the child's body was never found at the scene. Physical evidence and witness accounts suggested that Martínez was abducted, possibly by a drug smuggling cartel, following the accident.	
21 July 1986	Agustín Feced	65	Argentina	Feced, an Argentinian police official believed responsible for many tortures and extrajudicial executions during the country's Dirty War, was stated to have died in prison on 21 July 1986 while facing charges related to those activities. However, the records of his death and burial are incomplete and sometimes contradictory. Several sources doubt he was even imprisoned at the time. In 1986, the military hospital announced that Feced had died, but they did not offer any proof of it.	
28 July 1986	Suzy Lamplugh	25	London, England	British estate agent Suzy Lamplugh disappeared from Fulham, London, on 28 July 1986. In 1994, she was declared dead and presumed murdered. Despite further police investigations in 1998 and 2000, no trace of her has been found.	
14 August 1986	Jeremy Bright	14	Myrtle Point, Oregon, U.S.	Bright disappeared on 14 August 1986 while attending a county fair with his sister. The following day, his mother found his wallet, watch, and keys in his stepfather's house nearby, where he had been staying. Foul play has been suspected and police had a potential suspect who died in prison in 2007. While his family believes he is dead, and held a memorial service for him in 2011, they have not petitioned a court to make that declaration legal.	
23 October 1986	Philip Cairns	13	Dublin, Ireland	Irish schoolboy Philip Cairns disappeared 23 October 1986 on his way back to school after going home for lunch. His schoolbag was found abandoned in a previously searched lane near his house a few days later but there has been no trace of Philip and no arrests have been made in connection with the case.	
7 December 1986	Ingrid Von Scheven	41	Kingston, New York, US	Ingrid Von Scheven, best known as Ingrid Superstar, was a Warhol superstar in the 1960s. On 7 December 1986, she went out to buy cigarettes and a newspaper, and was never seen again. At the time, the Kingston police said, "There's a clear possibility of foul play, and we are intensifying our investigation."	
12 December 1986	Simon Parkes	18	Gibraltar	Leading seaman Simon Parkes, in the Royal Navy, went missing when the ship he was serving aboard was docked in Gibraltar. Parkes had gone into town and was last seen leaving the Horseshoe Bar on the peninsula. Because he disappeared on 12 December 1986, Allan Grimson (who favoured killing on that date and was serving aboard the same ship at that time) has been named as a suspect in Parkes' possible murder, though no trace of him or a body has been found.	

== 1987 ==
Date	Person(s)	Age when disappeared	Missing from	Circumstances	Refs.
January 1987	Catherine Frances Clampitt	27	Wichita Falls, Texas	Catherine Frances Clampitt had left Wichita Falls, Texas for Kansas City, Kansas in January 1987 to meet with John Edward Robinson and was never seen again.	
10 February 1987	Jenny Pandos	15	James City County, Virginia, U.S.	After two days away from school when her parents claimed she was sick, on the morning of 10 February, Pandos' parents say they found a lengthy note in her room telling them she was taking some time away from home, but warning them not to call the police or she would never return home. They did not notify the police for three days, and took even longer to let their family members know. The couple's account of the disappearance has changed, both of them failed lie detector tests and questions have been raised about whether Pandos really wrote the note. The case, and Pandos' older brother's attempts to find out whether his parents know more than they have claimed to, is the subject of the 2023 HBO series Burden of Proof.	
15 April 1987	Federico Caffè	73	Rome, Italy	Italian economist Caffè left his home at dawn on 15 April 1987, shortly after quitting university teaching, and disappeared. He was declared dead on 30 October 1998, and the mystery of his disappearance has not been solved.	
16 September 1987	Julie Weflen	28	Spokane, Washington, U.S.	Weflen, an operator for the Bonneville Power Administration, disappeared on 16 September 1987. Weflen was working at the Four Mounds substation in Spokane County. She vanished some time after 3:30 pm after going to check on a transformer. Her work truck was found with its door and back hatch open and her personal possessions inside and on the ground. The gravel in the vicinity showed signs of a struggle.	
3 December 1987	Sarinthip Siriwan	61	Thailand	Siriwan whose real name was "Phailin Collin" was a Thai actress from Nakhon chaisri District, Nakhon Pathom who disappeared on 3 December 1987 while filming a movie in Thailand. No trace of her has ever been found.	

== 1988 ==
Date	Person(s)	Age when disappeared	Missing from	Circumstances	Refs.
1988	Louise Kay	18	Eastbourne, England	Kay disappeared in the Beachy Head area in 1988, less than a year before the remains of Jessie Earl, who disappeared in 1980, were found in the same area. Due to the similar circumstances, authorities believe the cases might be related, and that both women were victims of Scottish serial killer Peter Tobin.	
3 February 1988	Vagn Hoffmeyer Hoelgaard	74	Marbella, Spain	A former head of office of the Danish Ministry of Foreign Affairs, Hoelgaard relocated from Denmark to Marbella following his retirement. He disappeared after leaving his home in 1988; he was declared legally dead in 1999.	
20 March 1988	Susan Smalley	18	Carrollton, Texas, U.S.	Smalley and Madison disappeared on the morning of 20 March 1988. Police know the girls were at Smalley's house by midnight, but they later left. The car in which they rode was found parked and locked in Dallas, Texas.	
20 March 1988	Stacie Madison	17	Carrollton, Texas, U.S.	Smalley and Madison disappeared on the morning of 20 March 1988. Police know the girls were at Smalley's house by midnight, but they later left. The car in which they rode was found parked and locked in Dallas, Texas.	
16 April 1988	Randy Wayne Leach	17	Linwood, Kansas, U.S.	Leach disappeared from a house party in Linwood in 1988.	
4 May 1988	Ron Arad	30	Lebanon	Ron Arad, a jet-fighter navigator, was captured on 16 October 1986 by Amal Shi'ite forces in southern Lebanon after ejecting from his damaged F-4 Phantom II while on a bombing mission. Israeli intelligence officers reportedly knew his whereabouts until the early hours of 4 May 1988, his 30th birthday, when he abruptly vanished from the house where he was held, at the village of Nebbi Shiit.	
26 May 1988	Antonio Bardellino	43	Armação dos Búzios, Brazil	Bardellino, a powerful Neapolitan camorrista and boss of the Casalesi clan, was said to have been murdered on 26 May 1988 by his right-hand man, Mario Iovine. Since his body was not found, he is rumored to still be alive.	
13 June 1988	Amber Swartz-Garcia	7	Pinole, California, U.S.	Swartz-Garcia was kidnapped while playing jump rope in her front yard.	
10 September 1988	Lee Boxell	15	Cheam, England	Lee Boxell disappeared near his home on 10 September 1988 on his way to a football match at Selhurst Park, and has not been seen since.	
20 September 1988	Tara Calico	19	Belen, New Mexico, U.S.	Calico disappeared near her home after embarking on a bike ride. A Polaroid photo of a boy and girl, bound and gagged, surfaced on 15 June 1989 in Port St. Joe, Florida and speculation was that Calico might be the girl in the photo, but that was never confirmed.	
7 October 1988	Piia Ristikankare	15	Piikkiö, Finland	15-year-old Piia Ristikankare disappeared on 7 October 1988 following an argument with her little brothers at her home in Piikkiö. She was declared dead in absentia in 2011.	
19 November 1988	Michaela Garecht	9	Hayward, California, U.S.	Garecht was abducted by an unidentified white male in a grocery-store parking lot.	

== 1989 ==
Date	Person(s)	Age when disappeared	Missing from	Circumstances	Refs.
14 January 1989	Michelle Lewis	21–22	Rockhampton, Australia	Michelle went missing after leaving a friend's house in North Rockhampton. The Queensland Police suspects Michelle to have been murdered, and in 2022 announced a $500,000 reward for information related to her disappearance.	
9 February 1989	Tiffany Sessions	20	Gainesville, Florida, U.S.	Sessions left her apartment and went out for an evening walk on 9 February 1989, but never returned.	
20 April 1989	Patricia Meehan	37	Circle, Montana, U.S.	Meehan, a resident of Bozeman, Montana, got into an accident on Montana Highway 200 while driving to Circle, a town in eastern Montana. Shortly afterward, a driver at the scene witnessed her climb over a fence and stare at the scene before disappearing into the nearby fields.	
26 May 1989	Charles Horvath-Allan	20	Kelowna, Canada	Horvath-Allan disappeared on 26 May 1989 from a campsite. A Canadian-born British national, he was hiking across Canada and had plans to meet up with his mother and stepfather in Hong Kong by August 1989, but never made it.	
June 1989	Reino Gikman	59	Vienna, Austria	Reino Gikman was the alias used by an undercover agent for the Soviet KGB, who disappeared in June 1989 and has not been seen since.	
2 August 1989	Ronald Jack	26	Prince George, British Columbia, Canada	An Indigenous Canadian family made up of Ronald Jack (aged 26); his wife Doreen (also aged 26); and their sons Russell (aged 9) and Ryan (aged 4) disappeared.	
2 August 1989	Doreen Jack	26	Prince George, British Columbia, Canada	An Indigenous Canadian family made up of Ronald Jack (aged 26); his wife Doreen (also aged 26); and their sons Russell (aged 9) and Ryan (aged 4) disappeared.	
2 August 1989	Russell Jack	9	Prince George, British Columbia, Canada	An Indigenous Canadian family made up of Ronald Jack (aged 26); his wife Doreen (also aged 26); and their sons Russell (aged 9) and Ryan (aged 4) disappeared.	
2 August 1989	Ryan Jack	4	Prince George, British Columbia, Canada	An Indigenous Canadian family made up of Ronald Jack (aged 26); his wife Doreen (also aged 26); and their sons Russell (aged 9) and Ryan (aged 4) disappeared.	
27 October 1989	Melanie Melanson	14	Woburn, Massachusetts, U.S.	Melanson went missing at a party near an industrial park and has not been seen since.	
3 December 1989	Melissa Brannen	5	Lorton, Virginia, U.S.	Brannen disappeared while attending a Christmas party at the Woodside Apartments and has not been seen since. Though a worker at the complex was convicted of abduction in 1990, her body has not been found and murder charges were not filed.	

== See also ==
- List of fugitives from justice who disappeared
- List of kidnappings
- List of murder convictions without a body
- List of people who disappeared mysteriously (pre-1910)
- List of people who disappeared mysteriously (1910–1970)
- List of people who disappeared mysteriously (1970s)
- List of people who disappeared mysteriously (1990s)
- List of people who disappeared mysteriously (2000–present)
- Lists of solved missing person cases
- List of unsolved deaths
