= Jack family disappearance =

1989 disappearance of a Canadian family

Jack family
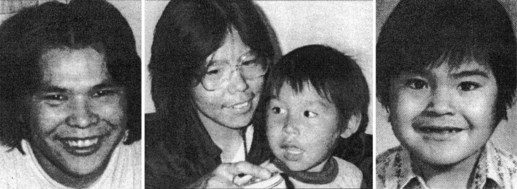
- Ronald (left), Doreen with Ryan (center), and Russell (right)
- Born: Ronald Jack: March 29, 1963 (26); Doreen Jack: April 24, 1963 (26); Russell Jack: February 28, 1980 (9); Ryan Jack: July 26, 1985 (4)
- Disappeared: August 2, 1989; Prince George, British Columbia, Canada
- Status: Missing for 37 years and 20 days
- Known for: Mysterious disappearance

The Jack family of Prince George, British Columbia, Canada, disappeared under mysterious circumstances on August 2, 1989. The Indigenous Canadian family consisted of the husband, unemployed woodcutter Ronald Jack (aged 26); his wife Doreen (also aged 26); and their sons Russell (aged 9) and Ryan (aged 4). They were last seen stepping into a pickup truck belonging to an unidentified man who had reportedly offered Ronald and Doreen jobs at a logging camp.

The whereabouts of the family remain undetermined. An anonymous call in January 1996 claimed that their bodies were buried on a ranch, but the caller did not elaborate on the claim and efforts to track down the caller were unsuccessful. The Royal Canadian Mounted Police (RCMP) maintained an open case file on the disappearance as of August 2020.

The Jack family disappearance is often linked to other unsolved crimes against Indigenous Canadians along the Highway of Tears, a stretch of British Columbia Highway 16 between Prince George and Prince Rupert. The case has been dubbed "Canada’s most tragic—and spooky—modern disappearance."

== Background ==
Ronald (b. March 29, 1963) and Doreen Jack (b. April 24, 1963) were both members of the Cheslatta Carrier Nation, an Indigenous First Nation located outside the village of Burns Lake, British Columbia. Little is known about their upbringing, though Doreen's sister Maria has stated that both her and Doreen's early life was marked by parental abandonment by her mother, physical abuse by her father, sexual abuse by family friends and the poverty that was endemic in the local Indigenous community. Doreen, Maria and another sister named Lorene were further mistreated when they were sent to the Lejac Residential School near Fraser Lake as children.

Following the closure of the Lejac Residential School in 1976, Doreen attended a live-in Catholic high school. It was during this period that she began a relationship with Ronald. At age 16, Doreen gave birth to her first son, Russell, on February 28, 1980. Two years later, she rekindled her relationship with Ronald and the couple moved in together with his parents in Southbank. Mabel Jack, Ronald's mother, has stated that he and Doreen seemed happy with this arrangement, and that there did not seem to be any difficulties between the couple, with Ronald treating Russell as his own son. The family's second son, Ryan, was born on July 26, 1985.

By the late 1980s, the Jack family's living situation had significantly deteriorated. Ronald had lost his job at a sawmill after injuring his back, forcing the family to go on welfare and relocate to Prince George to find better employment opportunities. Ronald's mother later described her son at this time as "desperate to work." Maria witnessed Ronald striking Doreen more than once, while Doreen had begun to drink heavily. At the time of their disappearance, the family's financial status had become dire; Doreen reportedly resorted to stealing cough medicine for her children, while Ronald told Mabel that he was in debt to someone for an undisclosed amount of money.

== Disappearance ==
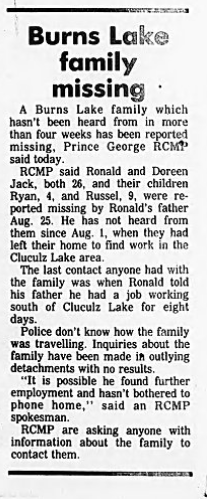
Article published in the Prince George Citizen, August 30, 1989

Locations
1 Jack Family home, Strathcona Avenue.

On the night of Tuesday, August 1, 1989, about a year after the relocation to Prince George, a still-unemployed Ronald visited the First Litre pub, located four blocks away from the Jack family's rented house at 2116 Strathcona Avenue. There, he was approached by an unidentified man who offered Ronald and his wife purported jobs at a logging camp located at or near Cluculz Lake, forty kilometres (twenty-four miles) west of Prince George along British Columbia Highway 16. The man told Ronald the job would last between ten days and two weeks, and would include work for Doreen as the camp cook and daycare for the Jack children.

The man Ronald spoke to has been described as a white man in his late 30s, who was between 183 cm to 198 cm (6' to 6'6') tall and weighed between 91 and 125 kg (200 to 275 lbs). The male had reddish-brown hair and a full beard, and was wearing a ball cap, red checkered work shirt, faded blue jeans, blue nylon jacket and work boots with leather fringes over the toes.

Because the Jack family did not own a vehicle, the unidentified man offered to transport Ronald and Doreen to the logging camp that night in his four-wheel pickup truck. Ronald and the man left the pub at about 11:16pm and returned to the Strathcona Avenue residence. In the early morning hours of August 2, Ronald called his brother in Burns Lake to arrange for his sons to stay with him while he was working, instead finding that doing so wouldn't be possible. Soon after, Ronald called his mother Mabel, also in Burns Lake, ending the conversation by telling her to look for him if he didn't come back. Two relatives of Doreen, including her sister Lorene, visited the house and witnessed the family packing belongings into the pickup truck. Ronald, Doreen and their children have not been seen since.

== Investigation ==
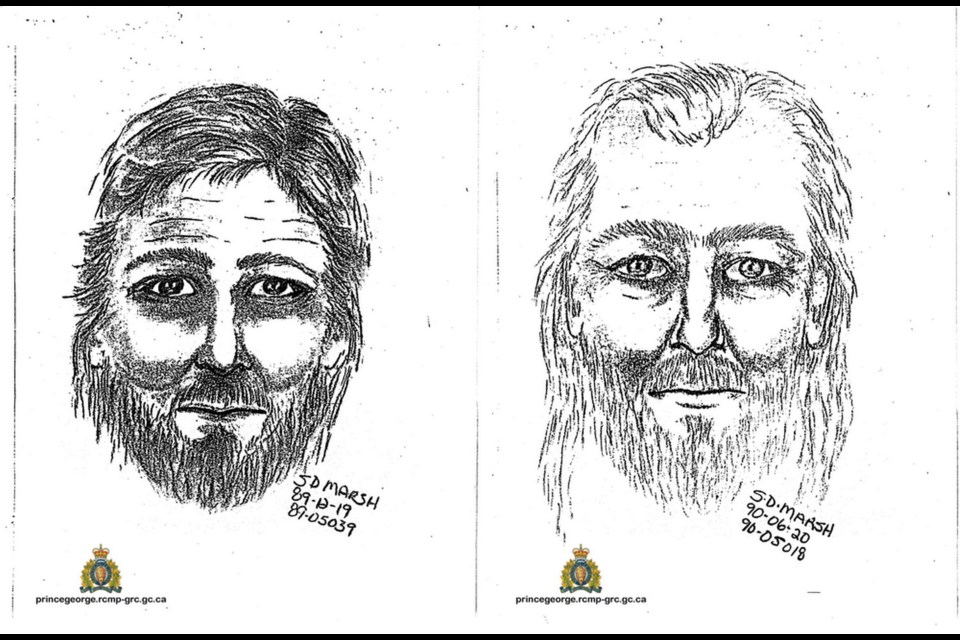
Sketch of the suspect

After Ronald had failed to contact her for several weeks, his mother reported the family missing in late August 1989. Police examined the Strathcona Avenue residence, where most of their furniture and clothes, as well as Russell and Ryan's school records, had remained since their departure. Various members of the Jack family, including Ronald's mother, have stated that there was no adequate support from any external organisations during the initial search on account of their Indigenous background.

On September 7, 1989, the Prince George detachment of the Royal Canadian Mounted Police (RCMP) incorrectly reported that the family had been found, leading to the investigation briefly being closed. The following year, a televised reenactment of the disappearance produced by CrimeStoppers was broadcast on Prince George station CKPG-TV, despite the station not reaching the region where the family was believed to have disappeared.

In 1992, it was reported that Prince George Native Friendship Centre and Mabel Jack, Ronald's mother, were both fundraising in an effort to increase reward money and get more publicity for the case. Crimestoppers was offering up to $2,000 for "information or arrest leading to the whereabouts of the Jack family."

=== Phone call ===
On the morning of Sunday, January 28, 1996, an anonymous caller contacted the RCMP detachment in Vanderhoof, British Columbia, sixty-one miles west of Prince George. The caller, who was traced to a house in nearby Stoney Creek, stated that "the Jack family are buried at the south end" of an unspecified ranch before hanging up. Police issued a province-wide appeal for the caller to make contact again, and released an audiotape of the call when he did not do so. Subsequent investigation of the call determined that a party was being held at the house when the call was made, and that Vanderhoof police were unable to locate all of the six to nine partygoers in attendance. The RCMP made another appeal for the caller to come forward in 2018.

In August 2019, police conducted searches with ground penetrating radar on property of the Saik'uz First Nation, south of Vanderhoof. No evidence concerning the Jack family was located.

== See also ==
- Highway of Tears
- List of people who disappeared mysteriously (1980s)
- Missing and Murdered Indigenous Women
