= 1980s Franciscan priest murders =

Unsolved disappearance case

Reynaldo John Rivera
- Born: October 29, 1924; Santa Fe, New Mexico, U.S.
- Died: August 5, 1982 (aged 57); Waldo, New Mexico, U.S.
- Cause of death: Homicide

John Patrick Kerrigan
- Born: January 20, 1926; Butte, Montana, U.S.
- Disappeared: July 20, 1984 (aged 58); Ronan, Montana, U.S.
- Status: Missing for 42 years, 2 months and 3 days

The 1980s Franciscan priest murders refers to the mysterious disappearances and murders of two Catholic priests, one of whom was a Franciscan, in the western United States between 1982 and 1984. On August 5, 1982, Father Reynaldo Rivera, a priest at the Cathedral Basilica of St. Francis of Assisi in Santa Fe, New Mexico, was murdered in an unknown location and his body found three days later. Two years later, on July 20, 1984, Father John Kerrigan, a diocesan priest in the Diocese of Helena and assigned to the Sacred Heart Catholic Church in Ronan, Montana, disappeared after leaving a bakery.

Several days later, bloodied articles of clothing were found along Montana Highway 35, as well as a blood-stained coat hanger. Kerrigan's vehicle was discovered in Polson seven days later; his wallet, which contained $1,200, was left in the trunk of the car, along with a bloody shovel and pillowcase. Kerrigan's remains have never been recovered.

Though a definitive connection between Rivera and Kerrigan has not been discovered, the murders of both priests have been linked due to the fact that Kerrigan also had ties to New Mexico prior to being appointed at the Roman Catholic Diocese of Helena. Additional parallels were uncovered at the respective crime scenes. In 1988, the cases were profiled together on the NBC series Unsolved Mysteries. In 2015, the Diocese of Helena published an extensive list of clergy and staff who had been implicated in sexual abuse of minors, in which Kerrigan was included.

== Subjects ==
=== Fr. Reynaldo Rivera, O.F.M. ===
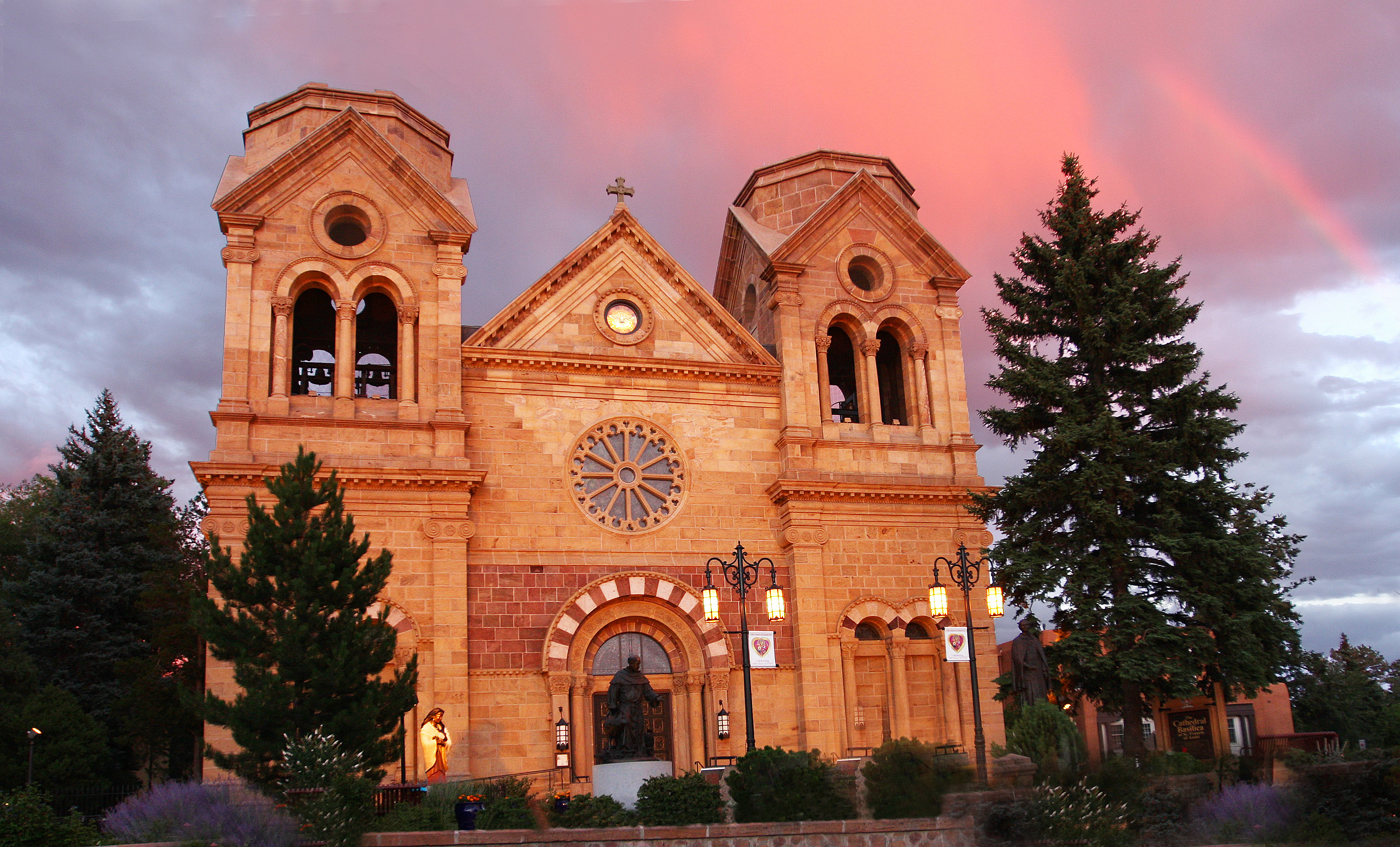
Fr. Reynaldo Rivera served as priest of the Cathedral Basilica of St. Francis

Father Reynaldo John Rivera (born October 29, 1924), a Catholic priest of the Franciscan order, served at the Cathedral Basilica of St. Francis in Santa Fe, New Mexico. On the evening of August 5, 1982, a phone call was placed to the rectory by a man who went by the name Michael Carmello; he claimed his grandfather was dying near a rest stop in Waldo, and that he had requested his last rites. Father Patrick Gerard, the priest who answered the call, told the man that his eyesight was too poor for him to safely drive, and asked that he call back momentarily. Rivera took the second call, and agreed to meet the man and perform his grandfather's last rites. The caller stated he would be waiting for Rivera in a blue pickup truck.

Days later, Rivera's body was found several miles away from the rest stop, lying in a muddy field near the Waldo exit on Interstate 25. He had been shot once in the stomach and strangled with wire, possibly a coat hanger. Rivera's brown 1974 Chevrolet Malibu was discovered parked at a rest stop on Interstate 40 near Grants, its gas tank empty. His last rites kit was never found. The Federal Bureau of Investigation (FBI) intervened in the investigation and produced a psychological portrait of the person(s) responsible for Rivera's death; the forensic psychologist determined the motive for Rivera's murder was revenge. Law enforcement briefly considered a recent parolee a suspect, but he was ruled out due to his alibi, as well as his fingerprints not matching the unknown prints discovered on Rivera's vehicle. A former Santa Fe resident who later moved to New York was considered another suspect.

=== Fr. John Kerrigan ===
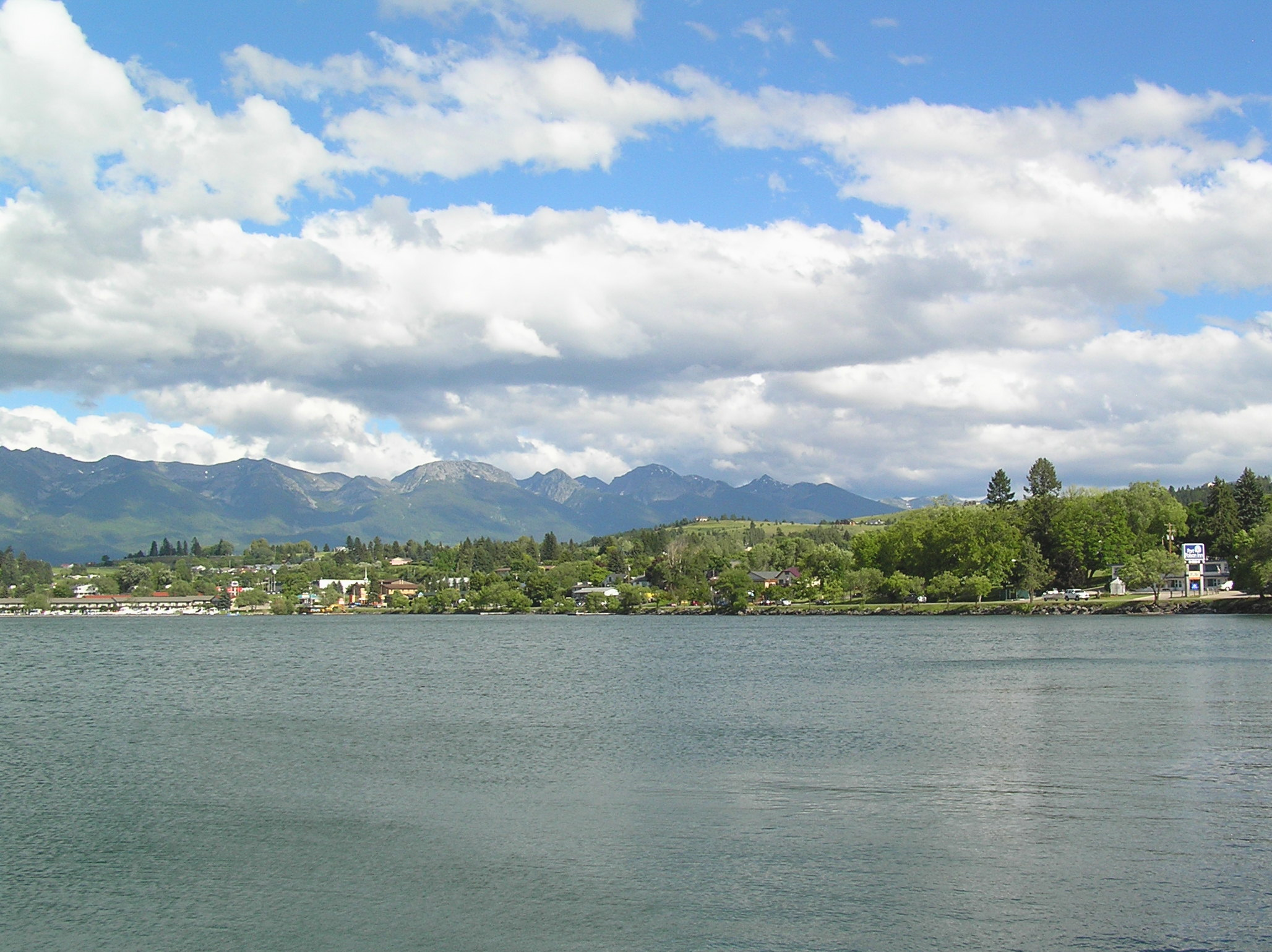
Bloodied clothing belonging to Kerrigan was found along the south shore of Flathead Lake

The Reverend Father John Patrick Kerrigan (born January 20, 1926), had served as a priest in Plains, Montana, before being transferred to the Sacred Heart Catholic Church in Ronan, on July 18, 1984. On the evening of July 20, two days after Kerrigan's arrival and appointment in the church, he left a bakery in downtown Ronan. This was the last time he was seen. Kerrigan failed to report for his 6:30 a.m. mass on July 21, and a missing person report was filed on July 23. On July 29, articles of bloody clothing were found lying alongside Montana Highway 35 on the shores of Flathead Lake near Polson, along with a bloodied coat hanger; these items were located roughly 5 miles (8.0 km) from Ronan. On July 30, Kerrigan's vehicle—also a brown Chevrolet Malibu—was discovered abandoned several miles away. In the trunk, his wallet, which contained US$1,200, was found, along with a blood-stained shovel and pillow case. Though Kerrigan's remains have never been recovered, he is believed to have been murdered.

== Investigation ==
Following Kerrigan's disappearance, New Mexico law enforcement were notified of the case due to similar characteristics with Rivera's murder. Similarities between the victims included their shared vehicles, as well as the manners in which they were murdered (or believed to have been murdered): in both incidents, the vehicles of the men were driven away from the crime scenes and there was evidence that wire coat hangers had been used; Rivera's autopsy showed that he had been strangled with some form of metal cord, possibly a coat hanger, while in Kerrigan's disappearance, a tangled and bloody coat hanger was found along with his clothing. Both men were approximately 58 at the time of their respective deaths and disappearances.

Law enforcement attempted to uncover further connections between Kerrigan and Rivera, and found that Kerrigan had spent time at the Congregation of the Servants of the Paraclete in Jemez Springs, New Mexico, in 1983, prior to his appointment in the Roman Catholic Diocese of Helena. This congregation was used as a retreat for clergy suffering from personal difficulties, such as substance abuse, depression, and sexual misconduct. Though the Diocese of Helena admitted Kerrigan had spent nearly a year there, they did not disclose the reason. No evidence was uncovered that Kerrigan and Rivera ever knew one another personally.

In November 1984, Lieutenant Gilbert Ulibarri, a police officer in Santa Fe, stated that he had "a gut feeling" that the two crimes were related, and were likely committed by "a drifter who has a psychological problem with priests." Despite the parallels in the crimes, Eric Lucero, a New Mexico State Police detective, insisted in 1992 that there was "no connection whatsoever" between the murder of Rivera and the disappearance of Kerrigan. In August 2022, Ulibarri said he does not believe the crimes are connected.

Two days after Kerrigan disappeared, 31-year-old schoolteacher Curtis Holmen went missing from Missoula, and his vehicle was found abandoned approximately 40 miles (64 km) from where Kerrigan's was discovered. Though there was no evidence connecting the two disappearances, Holmen's brother publicly insisted that they may be linked due to the proximity in location and time frame. Holmen's whereabouts are also unknown. Another potentially linked case was the disappearance of 54-year-old James Otis Anderson, an Episcopal priest who went missing from Townsend, Montana on June 13, 1982. Kerrigan and Anderson had previously worked together in White Sulphur Springs, Montana. Anderson was last seen driving east on Highway 12 in Townsend towards White Sulphur Springs, at 8:00 a.m. He was declared dead in absentia seven years later.

In 2015, after two groups of individuals brought a 2011 class action lawsuit against the Diocese of Helena for sexual abuse, the Diocese published a list of 80 clergy members who had been suspected or implicated in the sexual abuse of minors. Kerrigan was included among those on this list, which consisted largely of priests and nuns. Although Kerrigan has been said to be a Franciscan, he was actually a diocesan priest. In 2020, Brian D'Ambrosio, author of Montana Murders: Notorious and Unsolved, revealed that he now had access to the notes of the lead detective on the Kerrigan case. D'Ambrosio posited an alternative theory based on the notes, claiming that it was possible that Kerrigan staged the crime scene and faked his own death, perhaps even with assistance from the Diocese.

== See also ==
- List of people who disappeared mysteriously (1980s)
- List of solved missing person cases (1980s)
- List of unsolved murders (1980–1999)
