= Disappearance of Tiffany Sessions =

Unsolved 1989 disappearance of 20-year-old from Miami Florida

Tiffany Sessions
- Born: Tiffany Louise Sessions; October 29, 1968; Miami, Florida, U.S.
- Disappeared: February 9, 1989 (aged 20); 35th Place, Casablanca East Apartments
- Status: Missing for 37 years, 9 months and 5 days
- Known for: Being the subject of the largest search case in the history of Florida
- Height: 5 ft 3 in (1.60 m)
- Parents: Patrick Sessions (father); Hillary Sessions (mother)

Tiffany Louise Sessions (born October 29, 1968) is a missing woman from Tampa, Florida, who was last seen on February 9, 1989. Her family nickname was "Tiffy". She was attending the University of Florida in Gainesville and was majoring in business.

== Disappearance ==
External image
- Age progression of Sessions to age 44 (2013)

On the afternoon of her disappearance, Sessions told her roommate that she was going out alone for a power walk. Between 4:00 and 5:00 in the afternoon, she left her apartment on SW 35th Place. Sessions left her wallet, identification, and keys in her apartment. She was wearing a white pullover sweatshirt with long sleeves and grey horizontal striping with "Aspen" printed on the front of the shirt's collar, red sweatpants, and tennis shoes. She was also wearing a two-tone silver and gold women's Rolex wrist watch and carrying a black Sony Walkman.

After five hours, when Sessions had not returned, her roommate alerted Sessions' mother that her daughter was missing. The police did not initially handle the disappearance as a crime because a crime scene had not been found. There was no sign that Sessions left her apartment's parking lot or of a struggle.

People in the area of Sessions' disappearance have stated that someone fitting her description was speaking to individuals sitting inside a vehicle. Eyewitnesses were uncertain whether the woman entered the vehicle, and authorities have never confirmed that the individual was Sessions.

== Investigation ==
Michael Christopher Knickerbocker was considered a suspect in Sessions' disappearance. While Knickerbocker was in prison serving five consecutive life sentences, he reportedly told his fellow inmates that he murdered Sessions. He also said he chained Sessions to a tree and discarded her body close to Fort Myers in the Caloosahatchee River, but because Knickerbocker was not living in Gainesville at the time of Sessions' disappearance, the feasibility of his involvement has been questioned.

As of 2014, police believe that now-deceased and convicted serial-killer Paul Eugene Rowles was responsible for Sessions' disappearance and murder. At the time Sessions disappeared, Rowles was working for a construction-related company near the path where she was last seen. Rowles did not show up for work on the day Sessions went missing. Rowles had kept an address book with information on people he murdered (discovered by investigators in January 2013 following interviews with Rowles; he died a month later). The book listed Linda Fida, a known victim, as the first woman he killed; it may also contain a cryptic reference to Elizabeth Foster (another known victim whose body was found about one mile from where Sessions disappeared). Notably the book contained a notation "#2 2/9/89 #2", believed by investigators to refer to Sessions' date of disappearance, and to identify her as Rowles' second victim.

Sessions has been excluded from 150 unidentified decedents in the United States.

== Finding Tiffany Sessions projects and aftermath ==
The Federal Bureau of Investigation have said the search for Sessions is the largest in Florida's history. Public efforts to find Sessions include the Charley Project, and the Tiffany Sessions Facebook Project Page. The Sessions family are offering a $25,000 reward for any information in the case. They have worked closely with the Alachua County Sheriff's Department and the Florida Department of Law Enforcement to find Sessions' remains or convict any suspects involved in this case. In 2013 detective Kevin Allen said he had made finding Sessions his number one case. Sessions' mother Hillary has written a book about her missing daughter called Where's My Tiffany?, describing her joy in raising Tiffany and her heartbreak in losing her.

== See also ==
- List of people who disappeared mysteriously (1980s)
