= Kidnapping of Melissa Brannen =

1989 missing person case

Melissa Brannen
- Born: April 13, 1984 (age 42); Virginia, U.S.
- Disappeared: December 3, 1989; Lorton, Virginia, US
- Status: Missing for 36 years, 10 months and 3 days
- Parents: Michael Brannen (father); Tammy Brannen (mother)

Caleb Daniel Hughes
- Hughes shortly before he was released from prison in 2019
- Born: January 1966 (age 60); Virginia, U.S.
- Status: Incarcerated (Violated probation 9/2024) Detained Rocky Mount VA – Held in SW Regional Jail / will serve full sentence
- Conviction: Abduction with intent to defile
- Penalty: 50 years imprisonment

The kidnapping of Melissa Brannen occurred on December 3, 1989, at the Woodside Apartments in Lorton, Virginia, United States. The five-year-old daughter of Michael and Tammy Brannen, she was raised by her single mother who lived in the complex. She disappeared while attending a party held at the complex for its residents. Caleb Daniel Hughes, a handyman for the complex, was convicted of abduction with the intent to defile and sentenced to 50 years in prison. Her body has never been found, she has never been proven to be dead, and murder charges have never been filed. The case is considered an unsolved homicide by local police.

== Disappearance ==
On December 3, 1989, a Christmas party, with approximately 100 guests, was taking place at the apartment complex where Tammy Brannen lived with her daughter Melissa. As they were leaving the party, Melissa headed back in to get some potato chips and never came back. When she was not found, foul play was suspected. A search began almost immediately, with over 300 volunteers participating.

== Investigation ==
Groundskeeper Caleb Hughes became the prime suspect that very evening through witness accounts. Multiple women reported that Hughes made crude sexual propositions to them during the party, and others reported that Hughes had given unusual levels of attention towards the children at the party including Melissa. Police visited his apartment during the night, where Hughes's wife cooperated with police. The entire outfit of clothes Hughes was wearing at the time of the disappearance was found in the Hughes' washing machine, including his shoes (with the sides of the soles cut off, possibly to remove blood evidence), his belt and a sheath for a large knife. They had immediately been put there for washing by Hughes himself when he arrived home. Police seized them as evidence. Police also took the red Honda Civic sedan which Hughes owned, and examined the passenger's seat for fiber evidence. A polygraph examiner concluded that Hughes showed evidence of deception when questioned about his role in Melissa's disappearance.

Hughes' wife Carol was key in the investigation. She reported his arrival home from work several hours later than usual and also that extra mileage was on his car's odometer. Her husband explained the mileage as resulting from a side trip he took to purchase a 6-pack of beer and then taking a longer route home. Hughes never explained why he had driven out of his usual way to come home. In any event, his story was improbable as he claimed to have gotten home around 12:30 AM—liquor stores in Virginia do not sell alcohol past midnight per state regulations.

Fibers were extracted from the front seat of the vehicle. The victim had been reported as wearing a Big Bird sweater that had been purchased from JCPenney. Investigators obtained an identical outfit, and its fibers were compared with those found on the seat of Hughes's car. A match was found between the sweater and the fibers in the car. Also found were some hairs from a rare rabbit fur coat, worn by Tammy at the party. This evidence pointed towards the probability the victim had been sitting in the passenger's seat at some point during the evening.

Investigators were all but certain Hughes had killed Melissa. Although Virginia law did not require a body of the victim to file murder charges, the law does require prosecutors to identify the location of the murder. Lacking this evidence, Hughes was charged with kidnapping with intent to defile (i.e., kidnapping as a prelude to sexual assault). The fiber evidence was pivotal in establishing this charge, as prosecutors argued that there was no innocent reason to remove the girl's coat in the car and thus leave the dress fibers. Hughes was convicted of abduction with intent to defile on March 8, 1991, and sentenced to 50 years in prison.

Two men with no connection to the Brannen case attempted extortion via a $75,000 ransom demand. The men were arrested collecting the ransom. They were sentenced to 7 years 8 months, and 3 years 10 months.

== Aftermath ==
In 1995, a search of a lake was made after a power company worker found some red cloth in the lake. No evidence of a body was found.

About eight years after Brannen's disappearance, her mother remarried. Although she took on the surname of her new husband, Graybill, as her own, she retained the name Brannen in listings so that her daughter, if still alive, would be able to contact her. Graybill has raised four stepchildren with her new husband.

The story of her disappearance was told on The FBI Files in the eighth episode of the first season. It has also appeared on an episode of Forensic Files in the fifth episode of the fourth season, entitled "Innocence Lost".

Caleb Daniel Hughes was released from prison for good behavior on August 2, 2019, having served 29 years of his 50-year sentence. He was made to register as a sex offender after his release.

Caleb Hughes was rearrested on May 31, 2024, for "violating sex offender special instructions... [which] included not having contact with anyone under the age of 18." He was sent back to prison, with a new release date of 2039.

== See also ==
- List of people who disappeared mysteriously (1980s)
