= Disappearance of Tammy Belanger =

American crime

Tammy Belanger
- Born: Tammy Lynn Belanger; February 24, 1976; Exeter, New Hampshire, U.S.
- Disappeared: November 13, 1984 (aged 8); Exeter, New Hampshire, U.S.
- Status: Missing for 41 years, 11 months and 27 days
- Height: 4 ft 6 in (1.37 m)

Tammy Lynn Belanger (February 24, 1976 – disappeared November 13, 1984) is an American child who disappeared while walking to school in Exeter, New Hampshire, in November 1984. Police believe she was abducted.

On the morning of her disappearance, Belanger was seen by a neighbor crossing the street on her way to school. She did not arrive at school, and has not been seen since. The one suspect in the case, who had been convicted of sexual assault of a minor in 1979, was later convicted of burglary and indecent exposure in Florida in 1992, and died in 2012.

== Timeline ==
=== Disappearance ===
On the morning of Tuesday, November 13, 1984, Belanger left her home on River Street in Exeter, New Hampshire, to walk to the elementary school on Lincoln Street where she was in the third grade. A neighbor saw her cross Court Street at approximately 8 a.m. It was about 1 mile (1.6 km) to the school, which Belanger had walked since she was in the first grade. When Belanger had not returned home by 3:30 p.m., her mother called the school, only to find out that Belanger had not been in class, and called police. At the time, the school did not verify students' absences by proactively calling parents.

In the following days, police and volunteers searched 6–8 square miles (16–21 km^{2}) on foot and via helicopter and boat. The FBI and State Police helped to investigate leads. A nearby flooded quarry was searched by divers. Nothing of significance was discovered, and by November 20, the Exeter police chief said he had little hope of finding Belanger alive.

=== Suspect ===
In late December, WCVB-TV in Boston identified Victor Wonyetye (pronounced wuh-NET-ee), then 41 years old, as a suspect in Belanger's disappearance. Wonyetye had been living during November in a motel in nearby Rye, New Hampshire, and was jailed on a parole violation earlier in December. Wonyetye had been convicted in 1979 of felonious sexual assault of a female minor, his thirteen-year-old stepdaughter, and served four years in prison before being paroled in July 1983. Wonyetye's parole was revoked by the New Hampshire Parole Board on December 28, 1984, as he had left the state without informing his parole officer and had been convicted of a misdemeanor in Florida earlier in the year.

At the time Wonyetye was first named in connection with Belanger's disappearance, he was also a person of interest in the disappearance of Marjorie "Christy" Luna, who had vanished from Greenacres, Florida, in May 1984. The disappearances have similarities, as both Luna and Belanger were eight years old when they vanished, Luna had also been walking alone on a street near her home when she disappeared, and Wonyetye had also been living nearby at the time.

=== Later events ===
External image
- Age progression of Belanger to 36

The discovery of human remains in Allenstown, New Hampshire, in early November 1985 led to speculation of a connection with Belanger's disappearance; however, this was discounted by investigators. The victims of the Bear Brook murders, as they came to be known, were identified years later and confirmed to have no connection with Belanger.

On November 12, 1985, the day before the one-year anniversary of Belanger's disappearance, Exeter police announced that the investigation had come to a halt.

In January 1992, Wonyetye was convicted of burglary and indecent exposure in Florida. During surveillance of Wonyetye, police saw him peeking in the bedroom window of three young girls in West Palm Beach, Florida, a total of 14 times in less than three weeks. He received a 75-year sentence as a habitual offender.

In June 1994, police in Exeter opened the grave of a woman who had been buried in November 1984, apparently based on a tip they had received; nothing connected with Belanger's disappearance was found.

Wonyetye was released from prison in Florida in April 2012, and died in December 2012 in Florida at age 69.

In 2013, police involved in the initial investigation of Belanger's disappearance said that Wonyetye was the prime suspect within three days. His car, blue with Florida license plates and a broken tail light, had been seen in the area when Belanger disappeared. Also, Wonyetye called in sick to work that morning; he had been employed at an auto body shop in Exeter. While police believe he killed both Belanger and Luna, there was no supporting physical evidence and Wonyetye was never charged in connection with either disappearance.

Belanger's parents divorced, and her father, Nelson, died in September 2017.

== See also ==
- List of people who disappeared mysteriously (1980s)
