= Disappearance of Julie Weflen =

Washington disappearance case

Julie Weflen
- Born: Julie Ann Weflen; May 3, 1959
- Disappeared: September 16, 1987 (aged 28); Washington, U.S.
- Status: Missing for 38 years, 8 months and 14 days
- Height: 5 ft 2 in (1.57 m)
- Spouse: Mike Weflen

Julie Ann Weflen (born May 3, 1959) is a missing woman who was last seen on September 16, 1987. She disappeared from her workplace in Spokane County, Washington. Her case is considered a presumed homicide although her body has never been found and there are still no suspects. In 2004, true crime author Ann Rule included an entire chapter about Weflen's abduction in her book Kiss Me, Kill Me.

== Disappearance ==
Weflen worked as an operator for the Bonneville Power Administration in Spokane, Washington. She parked her minivan in the gravel lot along Four Mound Road and logged into the Spring Hill Substation near Riverside State Park at 2 p.m. on the day she disappeared. BPA workers have stated that she probably finished work and returned to the minivan about 3:45 p.m.

Weflen was last seen heading toward a substation at Four Mound and Coulee Hite Road. Her hard hat, toolbox, a water bottle, and a pair of sunglasses were located on the ground beside her truck and the driver's side door and back hatch were found open. Her purse was discovered in the rig where she had worked.

== Investigation and aftermath ==
A reward of $25,000 has been issued for any information leading to the arrest and conviction of the person or people involved in Weflen's disappearance. Since she disappeared, the BPA and local law enforcement officials have received plenty of information, but nothing has ever helped in finding her.

Weflen's former co-worker, John Polos, has hypothesised that her abduction may have been connected to other unsolved cases involving similar-looking women in the Spokane–Coeur d'Alene area at the same time; this theory has not been definitely proven by law enforcement who have ruled out serial killers Robert Lee Yates and Gary Ridgway as suspects. Weflen's mother died in 2006.

=== Potentially linked cases ===
- 17-year-old Laurie Lynn Partridge disappeared on December 4, 1974, after she left Ferris High School in Spokane, Washington to walk the two miles to her house. No one has ever heard from Laurie again since she never returned home.
- Nurse Kathryn Gregory, 24, disappeared on November 5, 1981, from a parking lot in Spokane's South Hills. Her car was found parked two blocks away from where she was last seen; foul play is suspected. "She looked like Julie's twin sister," Polos has said.
- Deborah Jean Swanson, 31, went missing on March 29, 1986, after she failed to return from the Tubbs Hill hiking trail in Coeur d'Alene, Idaho. Her car was later discovered locked the same day in a parking lot next to the trail.
- Sally Anne Stone, 21, went missing after she visited her physical therapist's office in Coeur d'Alene, Idaho on May 16, 1986. She was never heard from again.

== See also ==
- List of people who disappeared mysteriously (1980s)
