= Sarinthip Siriwan =

Thai actress (disappeared 1987)

- ศรินทิพย์ ศิริวรรณ
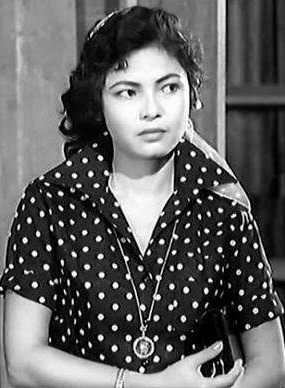
- Born: Phailin Collin (Thai: ไพลิน คอลลิน); 1 January 1926; Nakhon Chai Si, Nakhon Pathom, Thailand
- Disappeared: 3 December 1987 (aged 61)
- Status: Missing for 38 years, 10 months and 7 days
- Occupation: Actress
- Years active: 1954–1987
- Spouse: Chalee Intarawichit (Thai: ชาลี อินทรวิจิตร)

Sarinthip Siriwan (Thai: ศรินทิพย์ ศิริวรรณ; born 1 January 1926) is a Thai actress. She made her debut in a leading role in the film Hell Hotel (โรงแรมนรก) by Rattana Pestonji with Chana Sri-ubon and Surasit Sattayawong. She is a three-time recipient of the Saraswati award (รางวัลตุ๊กตาทอง). She received two in the Best Supporting Actress category for Free Chinese Movement (ขบวนเสรีจีน) in 1959 and Son of the Northeast (ลูกอีสาน) in 1982, and one in the Best Comedienne category for Unending Fire of Passion (ไม่สิ้นไร้ไฟสวาท).

== Early life ==
Siriwan's real name is Phailin Collin and she was born in Nakhon chaisri District, Nakhon Pathom in 1926. Her father is Dutch. She graduated from Phadung Darunee school.

== Disappearance ==
Siriwan disappeared on 3 December 1987, while she was filming the movie E chu ku pu pa (Thai: อีจู้กู้ปู่ป้า) by Kamthorn Thapkhanlai. No trace of her has been found.

== See also ==
- List of people who disappeared mysteriously (1980s)

== Filmography ==
- 1957 - โรงแรมนรก (Rongraem narok / Hotel Hell)
- 1959 - ขบวนเสรีจีน (Khabuan seri chin / Free Chinese Movement)
- 1977 - แผลเก่า (Phlae kao)
- 1979 - ลูกทาส (Look thas)
- 1980 - บ้านทรายทอง (Ban sai thong)
- 1982 - ลูกอีสาน (Son of the Northeast)
- 1983 - รัตนาวดี (Rattanawadee)
- 1986 - ไม่สิ้นไร้ไฟสวาท (Unending Fire of Passion)
- 1988 - อีจู้กู้ปู่ป่า (E chu ku pu pa)

== TV Drama ==
- 1961 - Si phaen din (สี่แผ่นดิน)
- 1966 - Leuat Ayuddhaya (เลือดอยุธยา)
- 1967 - Prabu thong (ปลาบู่ทอง)
- 1979 - Rom chat (ร่มฉัตร)
- 1982 - Phor krua hua pah (พ่อครัวหัวป่าก์)
- 1983 - Rak nan nirandorn (รักนั้นนิรันดร)
- 1985 - Kar long foong (กาหลงฝูง)
- 1987 - Fah tam (ฟ้าต่ำ)
- 1987 - Ban sai thong (บ้านทรายทอง)
- 1988 - Sa mi ti tra (สามีตีตรา)
- 1988 - Sairung sa lai (สายรุ้งสลาย)
