= Disappearance of Susan Smalley and Stacie Madison =

Young women missing from Texas

Stacie Madison
- Born: Stacie Elisabeth Madison; June 17, 1970; Texas
- Disappeared: March 20, 1988 (aged 17); Dallas, Texas
- Status: Missing for 38 years, 7 months and 25 days
- Height: 5 ft 6 in (1.68 m)
- Mother: Ida Madison

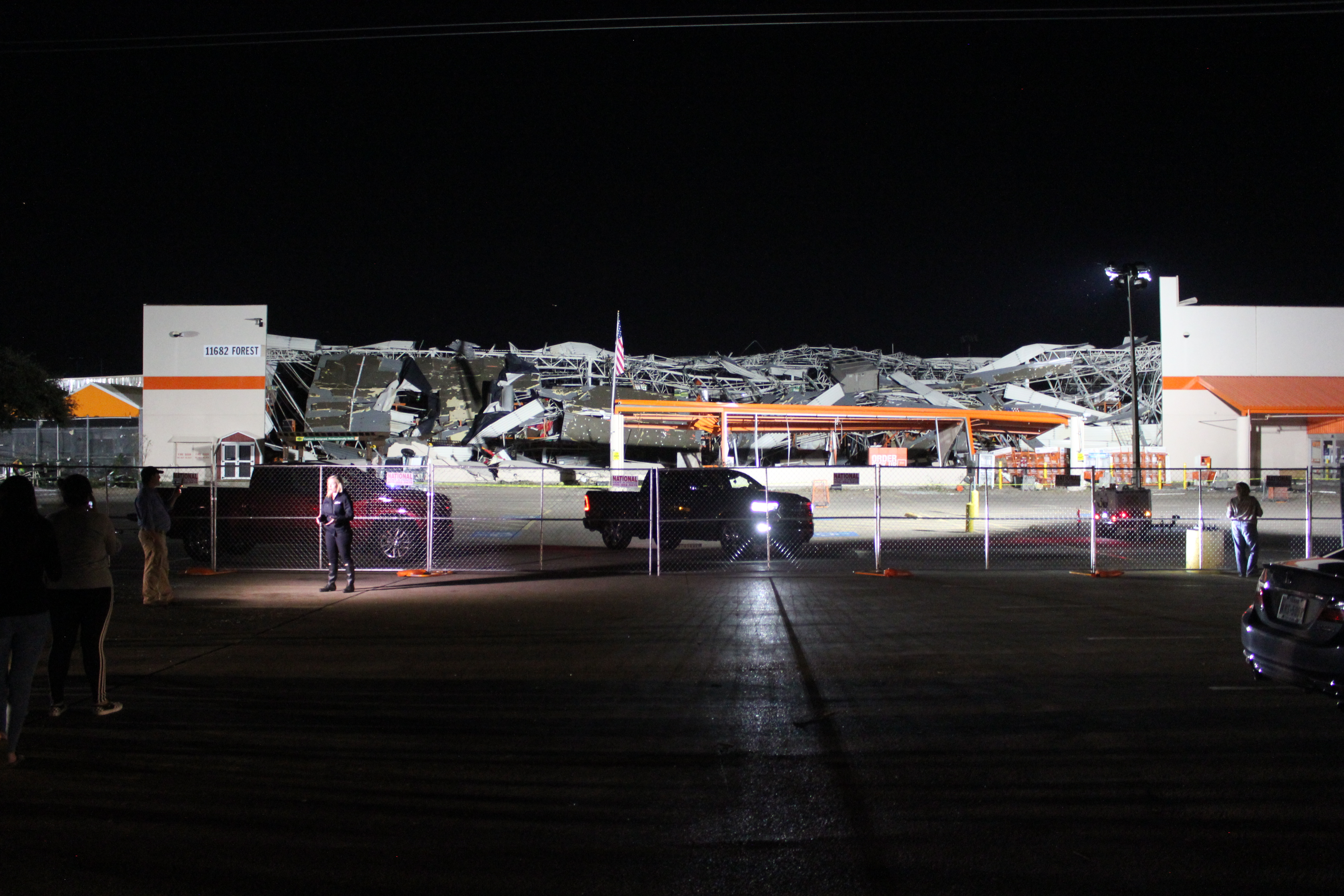
Forest Lane, Dallas where the Mustang was found abandoned. Photographed 2019 after hurricane damage.

Susan Renee Smalley (born September 19, 1969) and Stacie Elisabeth Madison (born June 17, 1970) were two young women from Carrollton, Texas, United States who disappeared on the morning of March 20, 1988.

== Disappearance ==
Stacie Madison worked as a receptionist and had plans of studying business at the University of North Texas. On the evening of March 19, 1988, her good friend, Susan Smalley, was staying overnight at her house. The pair left the house together for a short while in Madison's 1967 Ford Mustang convertible, a car that was painted in the emblematic colors of their high school and which Madison recently bought with earnings from her two jobs. Later, the girls were seen attempting to purchase alcohol at a 7-Eleven, but the clerk did not sell it to them since they were minors.

Madison and Smalley returned to the house, where Madison phoned a friend at around midnight. The girls left the house again shortly after the call, with Madison's car no longer seen parked in front of the house. The last time anyone saw the girls, they were at the Steak and Ale, the restaurant where Smalley worked as a waitress. An employee there told investigators that Smalley had been talking to another co-worker while Madison waited in the parked car. It is believed that they went to a small party in Arlington, Texas. Smalley and Madison were reported missing the next morning. The Mustang they were driving the previous night was found abandoned in the parking lot of a Dallas shopping center with personal belongings of both girls inside. It is believed that Madison and Smalley, at some point in the evening, had cruised on Forest Lane, which was a popular place that teens hung out during the 70s and 80s. Since the Mustang parked close by, it is possible that they got into another person's vehicle, since they left their purses, jackets, and a boombox in the back seat of Madison's Mustang. When last seen, Madison was wearing white cotton pants and a white long-sleeved sweatshirt with a pink and orange logo, and tennis shoes. Smalley was last seen wearing a white sweater and blue jeans, and she was carrying a navy blue shoulder bag with camel trim.

== Investigation and aftermath ==
Susan Smalley
- Born: Susan Renee Smalley; September 19, 1969; Texas
- Disappeared: March 20, 1988 (aged 18); Dallas, Texas
- Status: Missing for 38 years, 7 months and 25 days
- Height: 5 ft 8 in (1.73 m)

Several months after the two friends went missing, Madison's last boyfriend confessed to a girl whom he had been dating that he killed both Madison and Smalley, then dumped their bodies in a local cemetery. After the girl shared this with police, Madison's boyfriend underwent a polygraph. The results were "inconclusive". He later relocated to Florida, moving from town to town for over a decade. Attempts to contact him were unsuccessful. Stacie's former boyfriend has a history of abusing women long after this case. He has lived in several states, including Kentucky, Tennessee, Florida, Texas, and Utah, and he has left a trail of girlfriends, a wife or two, and his children claiming he was abusive. Due to the lack of better avenues to pursue in the case, detectives once consulted a psychic, only to be told that the girls were murdered by a blond-haired white male with glasses who was between 28 and 34 years old and who dumped them near Grapevine Lake. However, a search of that area failed to turn up anything. The Susan Smalley and Stacie Madison case is still active.

Locations 1988
1 Steak and Ale 5151 Belt Line Road where they were last seen.
2 Forest Lane where the Mustang was found abandoned.

In 2009, a book entitled This Night Wounds Time: The Mysterious Disappearances of Stacie Madison and Susan Smalley was self-published by Shawn Sutherland, who grew up in Carrollton and was twenty-four when the girls vanished. According to Sergeant Joel Payne, who is the lead detective with Carrollton police, the book caused the investigation to be renewed "start[ing] from scratch" not only in Carrollton, but in neighboring Denton County as well.

== See also ==
- List of people who disappeared mysteriously (1980s)
