= Disappearance of Jenny Pandos =

1987 disappearance of American teenager

Jenny Pandos
- Born: Jennifer Lynn Pandos; Virginia, U.S.
- Disappeared: February 10, 1987 (age 15)
- Status: Missing for 39 years, 5 months and 30 days
- Occupation: Student
- Parents: Ron Pandos (father); Margie Pandos (mother)
- Distinguishing features: Caucasian female. Brown hair, hazel eyes. Left-handed.

Jennifer Lynn "Jenny" Pandos (born October 29, 1971) is an American teenager who disappeared from Williamsburg, Virginia in 1987.

== Disappearance ==
On the morning of February 10, 1987 Jenny's parents had entered her room to find her missing. Her purse was gone, but all her other belongings, including her coat, were left behind. A note had been left behind that said, "Your daughter's with me. She's fine. She's having some problems and needs some time away." which switched to "I'm fine. I just need time to think. Both of you, please go to work tomorrow ‘cause I will try to call you. I won't call you at home, only at one of y'all's work. Do not call the police. I can easily find out if you do. I may never come back home. Don't tell my friends about this. Just tell them that I'm sick."

Jenny's brother believed that their parents may have had something to do with her disappearance. He says their father was abusive, and he thinks their story is suspicious. He appeared in a documentary about it called Burden of Proof. Burden of Proof eventually highlighted another suspect, Jenny's boyfriend at the time, Tony Tobler. Jenny and Tony were said to have a very intense relationship, and in the past, Jenny had got pregnant with his child and had an abortion.

== Aftermath ==
In 1991 a deceased unidentified woman was found in Virginia and thought to have been Pandos, but this was proven false. A documentary about the case was released on HBO in June 2023.

== See also ==
- List of people who disappeared mysteriously (1980s)
