= Disappearance of Melanie Melanson =

Missing teenager from Woburn, Massachusetts, United States

Melanie Melanson
- Born: Melanie Jo Melanson; November 1, 1974; Woburn, Massachusetts
- Disappeared: October 27, 1989 (aged 14); Some woods off of Montvale Avenue, near the Stoneham/Woburn line
- Status: Missing for 36 years, 9 months and 18 days
- Height: 5 ft 3 in (1.60 m)
- Parents: John Melanson (father); Irene Melanson (mother)

Melanie Jo Melanson (born November 1, 1974) is a missing teenager from Woburn, Middlesex County, Massachusetts. She vanished while at a party on October 27, 1989; at first, investigators believed she fled to Florida. However, subsequent investigations by both authorities and a private investigator have turned up no leads.

== Disappearance ==
Locations 1988
1 Montvale Avenue, Woburn, Massachusetts.

Melanson was a freshman in high school, and looking forward to a change of schools. At the time of her disappearance, she was living with her grandmother yet maintained contact with her parents. She was asked to attend a party on the evening of October 27, 1989.

On the day of her disappearance, Melanson and a friend left school early and decided to go home. That night, she told her grandmother she was going to have a sleepover at a friend's house (the friend was also her next-door neighbor). Melanson used the story to cover her attendance at the party. The party was held in a patch of woods near an industrial park; Melanson was the youngest guest there. She went with a group of five male friends. The party did not end until early the next morning; no one who knew Melanson saw or heard her returning from the party.

During the afternoon of October 28, after Melanie's family discovered she had been at the party, they frantically called almost every attendee they could reach. They learned nothing of Melanson's whereabouts. Finally, they reported her missing.

The police determined that she was last seen with two boys she had known. They gave conflicting stories of what might have happened to her. Police said each boy claimed the other was the last one who had been with Melanson. One of the boys also said he had seen her at the very head of a trail in the early morning hours of October 28.

Age progressed photo of Melanie to 36 years old (2010)

== Investigation ==
The Woburn Police Department originally thought that Melanson had run off to Florida, as she had run away before. They organized a massive search to find the teenager, using everything from cadaver dogs to helicopters, and there were substantial digs as well. None of the searches were successful, and no clues to Melanson's disappearance were found. There have been no arrests in the case. In August 1992, an anonymous caller suggested police should search a pond near the party site; although police followed up, nothing was found.

== Aftermath ==
In the spring of 2009, authorities announced a renewed push on the case and offered a $5,000 reward for information to solve it. In 2012, a doctor hired in the case has used a new science method called Decomposition Odor Analysis (DOA) to help find Melanie.

Police now believe Melanson was a victim of foul play. Her grandmother, parents and brother are now deceased.

== See also ==
- List of people who disappeared mysteriously (1980s)
