= Disappearance of Diane Suzuki =

Disappearance of university student

Diane Suzuki
- Born: Diane Yayoe Suzuki; May 14, 1966; Hawai'i
- Disappeared: July 6, 1985 (age 19); Aiea, Hawaii
- Status: Missing for 41 years, 4 months and 1 day
- Education: University of Hawaiʻi at Mānoa
- Occupations: Student @UH Manoa; P/T dance instructor
- Height: 4 ft 11 in (150 cm) tall
- Parent(s): Yuri Suzuki (mother, deceased), Masaharu Suzuki (father, deceased)

Diane Suzuki was a nineteen-year-old dancer and student at the University of Hawaiʻi at Mānoa who disappeared on July 6, 1985, and has since been the focus of one of the most notorious modern criminal investigations in the history of the state of Hawaii. The Diane Suzuki investigation was the first instance in which the Honolulu Police Department used luminol and other technological advances in forensic science.

== Disappearance ==
Suzuki was a female resident of Halawa, 4 feet 11 inches tall, 109 pounds, with a slim build, and of Japanese descent. Suzuki was last seen at about 5 p.m. on July 6, 1985, outside the Rosalie Woodson Dance Academy in Aiea, where she was employed as a dance instructor.

During the same time period in Hawaii, there were the unsolved killings of at least nine women on Oahu, including the deaths of Lisa Au, Regina Sakamoto, and others all over the island. Five, including that of Sakamoto, in which the victims were found with their hands tied behind their back, were attributed to an unidentified serial killer known as the Honolulu Strangler. However, Suzuki's disappearance did not fit that profile.

== Investigation and aftermath ==
The discovery of blood evidence at the site led to legislation that overhauled Hawaii's harassment laws to include stalking, and changed the status of TRO violations to a class C felony (with a maximum penalty of 5 years in jail) in the hope of preventing further violence against women. In 1993, Keith Kaneshiro, who was then prosecuting attorney for the City and County of Honolulu, attempted to re-open the case, but after more than 300 hours of grand jury testimony and thousands of dollars spent on the investigation, no charges were filed. The case remains unsolved.

== Media ==
Retired Honolulu Police Department Major Gary Dias wrote a book entitled Honolulu Cop including details on his investigation into the Au and Suzuki murders.

== See also ==
- List of people who disappeared mysteriously: post-1970
