= Disappearance of Jeremy Bright =

Unsolved 1986 disappearance of 14-year-old from Oregon

Coordinates: 43.059180°N 124.142220°W

Jeremy Bright
- Bright in 1983
- Born: Jeremy Doland Bright; May 25, 1972; Baltimore, Maryland, U.S.
- Disappeared: August 14, 1986 (aged 14); Myrtle Point, Oregon, U.S.
- Status: Missing for 40 years, 2 months and 3 days
- Height: 6 ft 0 in (1.83 m)

Jeremy Doland Bright (born May 25, 1972 – disappeared August 14, 1986) is an American teenager who disappeared under mysterious circumstances while attending the Coos County Fair in Myrtle Point, Oregon. At the time of his disappearance, Bright resided in Grants Pass and had been visiting family in Myrtle Point. On August 14, 1986, he attended the Coos County Fair with his younger sister. During the day, the pair separated, but Bright failed to meet her that afternoon, as arranged, at the carnival's ferris wheel. Several witnesses reported seeing Bright forcibly removed from the area by an unknown man, though these sightings were not confirmed.

Initially, local law enforcement suspected foul play in Bright's case; however, within the week following his disappearance, several reported sightings of him in the area led detectives to reverse this decision, and he was temporarily classified as a runaway. Numerous theories and rumors circulated in Myrtle Point following the boy's disappearance, which were detailed in a 1989 segment on NBC's Unsolved Mysteries. Among them were that Bright had overdosed on a drug at a party and his body had been disposed of by those present; another that he had been shot by local men while swimming in the Coquille River, and the men had attempted to nurse him back to health but had then buried Bright's body in a shallow grave after he succumbed to the wound. Law enforcement conducted searches of property in connection with these rumors, but found no evidence leading to Bright's discovery.

A local man who had babysat Bright during his childhood, Terry Lee Steinhoff, was considered a suspect in Bright's disappearance after being convicted of murdering a 32-year-old woman; there had been reports that Bright was seen in Steinhoff's truck the day he disappeared. Steinhoff died in prison in 2007. In August 2011, Bright's family stated that they presumed him dead and held a formal memorial service in his memory. As of 2026, his whereabouts remain unknown.

== Background ==
In August 1986, fourteen-year-old Jeremy Bright, a resident of Grants Pass, Oregon, was staying in Myrtle Point with his stepfather and younger sister. Born in Baltimore, Maryland, Bright had been raised in Myrtle Point. On Wednesday, August 13, Bright attended the Coos County Fair with his friend Johnny Fish. That day, he called his mother, Diane, from a payphone, and made plans for her to pick up him and his 10-year-old sister, S'te (es-tEE), in Myrtle Point on August 15. Later the same day, Bright met with his stepfather at a tavern owned by his grandmother, and was given money to attend the fair the next day. This was the last time he was seen by his stepfather or grandmother.

== Disappearance ==
Locations
1 1702 Coos County Fairgrounds, Myrtle Point, OR

On Thursday, August 14, Bright attended the fair a second time, now with S'te. The two parted ways at approximately 2 p.m., with Bright planning to meet up with his sister again at 5 p.m. near the ferris wheel on the fairgrounds. He never reappeared. He was last seen wearing a black windbreaker jacket, a red tank top, nylon blue shorts, and a pair of black, size 13 Nike shoes with red shoe laces.

The following day, August 15, Bright's mother arrived at his stepfather's house in Myrtle Point to pick up Jeremy and S'te; inside, she found Bright's wallet, watch, and the keys to their Grants Pass apartment. After Bright failed to surface that day among any of his family members, she contacted the authorities and reported him missing.

== Investigation ==
External image
- Age progression of Bright to age 48

Law enforcement initially suspected foul play in Bright's disappearance, but on August 23, 1986, one week after his disappearance, it was announced that they were no longer suspecting foul play due to alleged sightings of Bright in the days after he disappeared, some of which were reported as late as August 16 or 17. Law enforcement believed that Bright may have run away with the traveling carnival. Alternately, several individuals (including S'te) had reported prior that they witnessed Bright be "forcibly removed" by a man near the fairgrounds' ferris wheel between 1:00 and 1:30 p.m.

Several rumors circulated at the time of Bright's disappearance: One claimed that Bright, who had a heart murmur, had attended a party and ingested a beer laced with an illegal drug which caused him to fatally overdose. Another, submitted by an anonymous tip through a prison inmate, claimed that Bright had accidentally been shot to death by a group of quarrelsome men while with his friends at a local swimming hole along the Coquille River. Another alternately claimed that Bright had been shot during a target practice. Allegedly, those responsible attempted to nurse Bright back to health at a remote cabin, but he succumbed to his wound. The tipster claimed his body had been buried in the woods in a shallow grave. Police, however, searched the aforementioned cabin and surrounding area, and found nothing.

Cecelia Fish, the sister of Bright's friend Johnny, told police that the night of Jeremy's disappearance, she witnessed an unnamed male resident of her apartment building stumble inside the entryway, covered in blood.

Numerous wells in the Myrtle Point area were searched following Bright's disappearance after an anonymous tip was submitted in mid-August 1986, which stated Bright's body was in an area well. Another unfruitful tip was given to law enforcement which suggested they "follow a road to a concrete bridge in western Nebraska." Another tip was received leading investigators to a young man named Jeremy Bright who was working for a circus company in Florida, where many traveling carnivals and circuses relocate during winter months, but the man was determined to be someone else from Colorado who shared the same name.

In August 1988, filming began for a segment on Bright’s disappearance for the series Unsolved Mysteries. The episode aired in January 1989.

=== Terry Lee Steinhoff ===
According to some accounts, Bright was last seen in the passenger's seat of a truck owned by a young man named Terry Lee Steinhoff, who at one time babysat Bright. In January 1989, a week after the case was featured on Unsolved Mysteries, Steinhoff was charged in the stabbing death of 32-year-old Patricia Morris and police considered Steinhoff a potential suspect in Bright's disappearance. Steinhoff died in prison in 2007 of a heroin overdose.

=== Continuing investigation ===
According to a 2007 report, Bright's mother has resided in Florida since 1998, but returns to Myrtle Point each summer to assist in search efforts.

As of 2017, Bright remains missing, and is presumed dead by his family. In an obituary for Bright's maternal uncle, who died in Pendleton, Oregon in 2010, it was written that he was preceded in death by "most probably his oldest nephew, Jeremy Bright who has been a missing child since August, 1986." In August 2011, his family held a formal memorial service in his memory.

In October 2016, a pond on private property approximately 25 miles (40 km) from Myrtle Point was searched after a tip was received that Bright may have been disposed of there; the search, however, proved fruitless.

== See also ==
- List of people who disappeared mysteriously: post-1970
