= Disappearance of Michelle Lewis =

1989 missing person case in Australia

Michelle Lewis
- Born: Michelle Coral Lewis; 1967
- Disappeared: 14 January 1989; Rockhampton, Queensland
- Status: Missing for 37 years, 10 months and 2 days
- Education: Glenmore State High School
- Height: 155 cm (5 ft 1 in)

Michelle Coral Lewis is an Australian woman who disappeared on the night of 14 January 1989 while riding home on a mountain bike after spending time at a friend's house in the suburb of Kawana in the regional Australian city of Rockhampton, Queensland.

In 2022, the Queensland Government offered a reward of $500,000 for information into Lewis' disappearance.

== Background ==
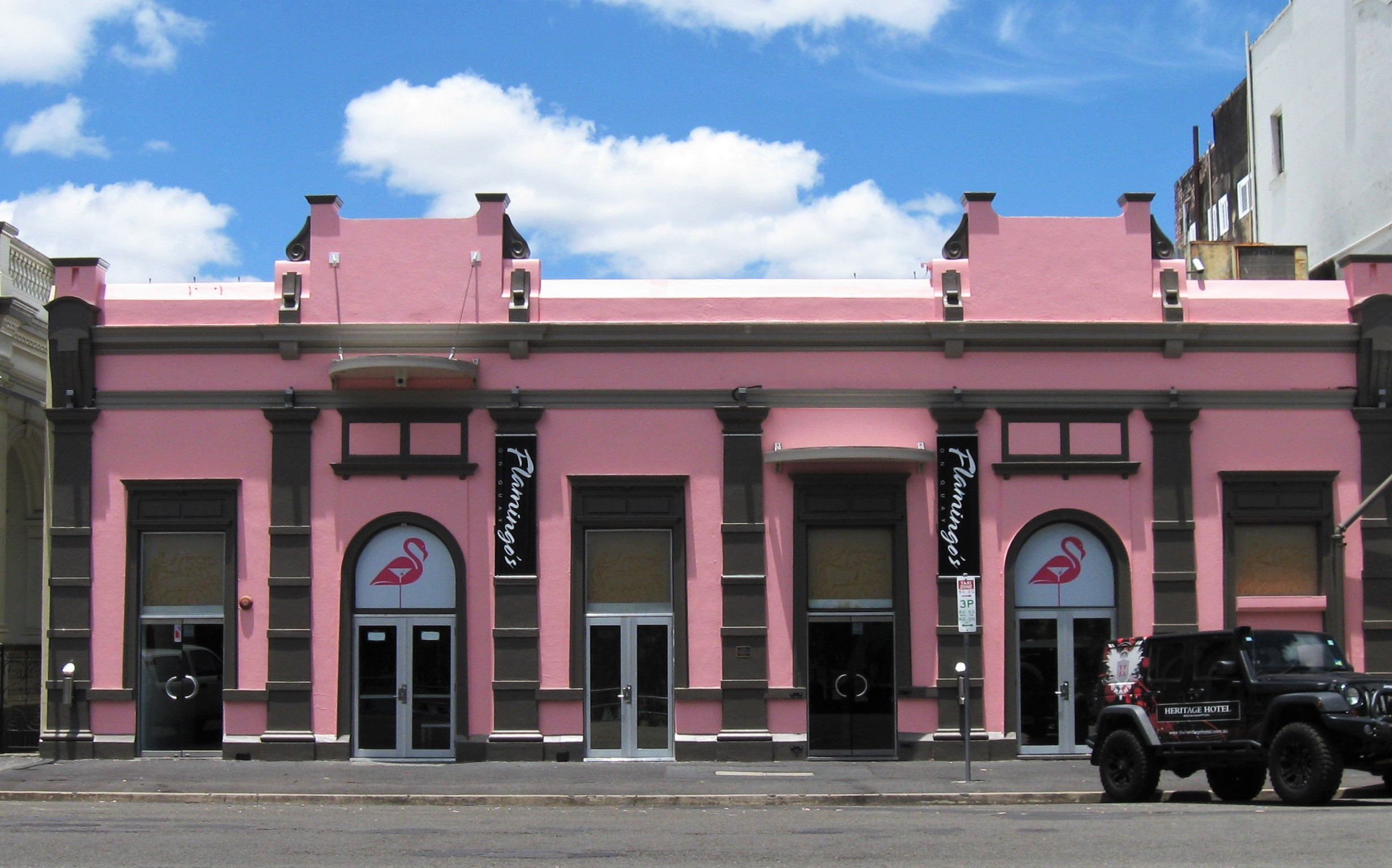
Flamingo's, where Michelle Lewis was a regular in the late 1980's

Born in 1967, Lewis had been abandoned by her mother when she was just a few weeks old, and subsequently raised by her grandmother.

Lewis attended Glenmore State High School and was described as a "tomboy", "very independent" and was friends with only a handful of girls.

When Lewis' grandmother died, Adeline "Dell" Salhus fostered Lewis. Salhus' adult children lived in Tully but her 19-year-old grandson Kenny Harris, who had cerebral palsy, lived with her at the time of Lewis' disappearance. Lewis and Harris became friends and were said to be protective of each other.

After leaving school, Lewis worked various jobs including at a piggery and a panel beater's shop.

Before she went missing, Harris and Lewis were known to be regulars at the popular Flamingo's nightclub in the city centre.

== Disappearance ==
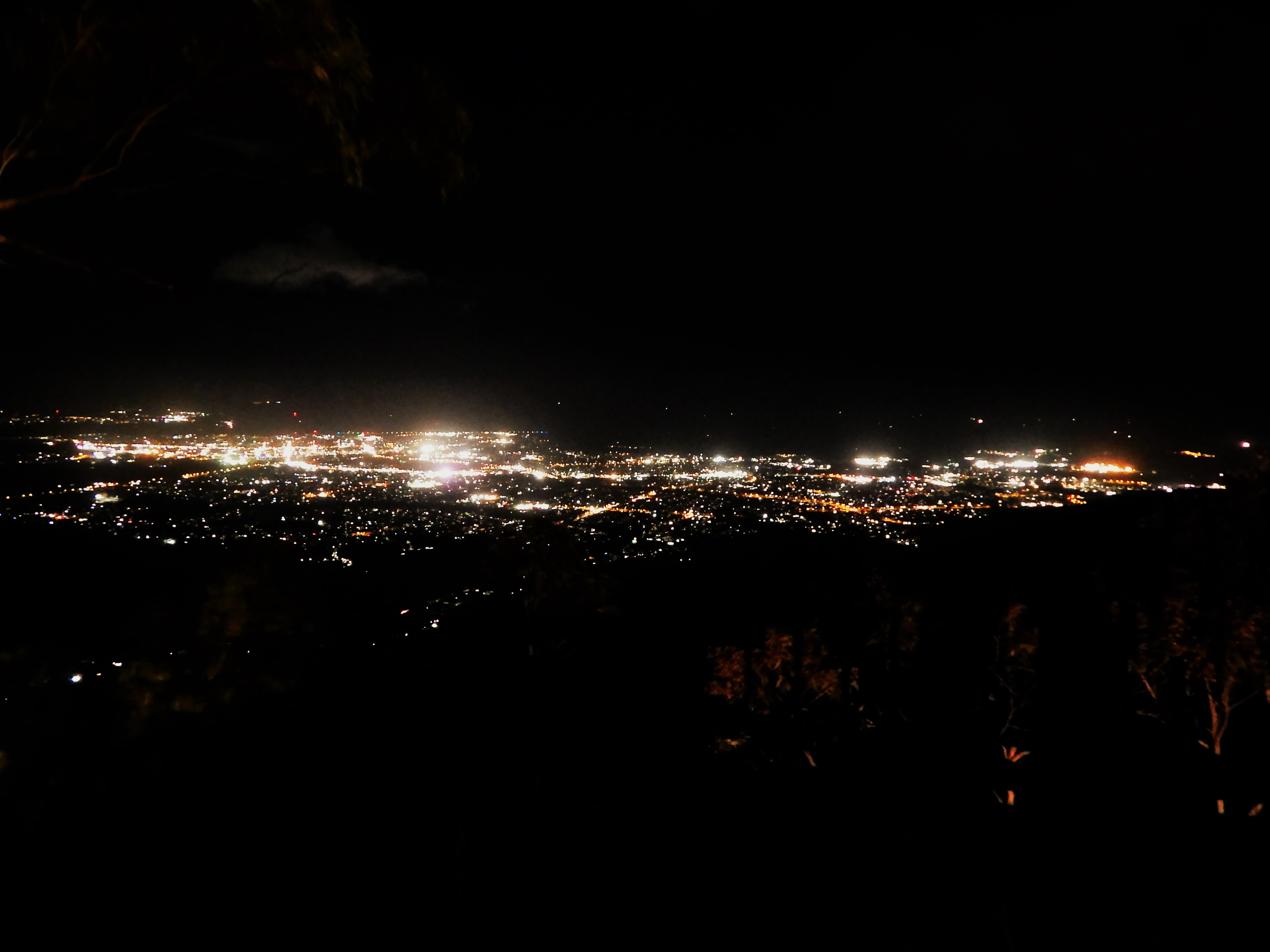
The city lights of Rockhampton where Michelle Lewis went missing on the night of 14 January 1989

Locations
1 Stenlake Avenue - 22:45 Lewis left Kerry Bartleys home
2 Alexandra Street - Michelle Lewis's home

Lewis had spent approximately four years living with her foster mother prior to her disappearance.

On the night of 14 January 1989, Lewis had been spending time with her friend Kerry Bartley, watching movies at Bartley's Stenlake Avenue home in the suburb of Kawana. Lewis and Bartley had been friends since they became neighbours when they were both aged 13.

At around 10:45pm, Lewis left Bartley's house on a maroon and white Malvern Star mountain bike, wearing a pink tie-dyed singlet top (with the word "SURF" imprinted on the front in yellow lettering) and a pair of boardshorts, intending to ride a short distance to her home in Alexandra Street.

It was the final time Lewis or her mountain bike were seen.

When Salhus awoke on the morning of 15 January 1989 and found no trace of her foster daughter or her much-loved mountain bike, she reported Lewis missing.

Harris was distraught and searched for her in many places and became "obsessed" with finding her, even turning up at locations where police were searching to watch them work. When asked what he was doing there, he would say "she's my mate."

== Investigation ==
A major police investigation, led by detective Ann Gumley, was launched but despite a large number of interviews conducted and statements obtained, police found no indication of how Lewis had disappeared.

Speaking about the case in 2013, Gumley said: "If you find that bike, you'll find Michelle."

A man phoned the Rockhampton Police Station on 18 February 1989 who claimed to have information relating to Lewis' disappearance but hung up before detectives could speak with him. In 2022, police urged this person to contact them again.

The case was reviewed in 1999 as part of the investigation into Rockhampton serial killer Leonard John Fraser, but there was no information to suggest he had been involved. Fraser was serving time for rape at the time of Lewis' disappearance but there were suggestions that he left correctional facilities with low security on occasion.

Following calls from Gumley for the Homicide Cold Case Investigation Unit to re-examine the case, the team began reviewing the Michelle Lewis investigation in 2021.

In 2022, Detective Senior Sergeant Tara Kentwell said they were confident the case could be solved, but the police now strongly suspected that Lewis had been murdered around the time she went missing.

Salhus' grandson Kenny Harris moved back to Tully, where he was murdered in January 2003 by 41-year-old Shaun Danny Dennis who was sentenced to life in prison after being found guilty in the Cairns Supreme Court in April 2004.

Salhus had wanted to write a book about her foster daughter but died in 2012.

== Reward ==
During National Missing Persons Week in 2022, the Queensland Government announced that a reward of $500,000 was being offered to anyone who gives information about Lewis' suspected murder that leads to the conviction of the person or persons responsible.

The substantial reward attracted considerable media interest.

== See also ==
- List of people who disappeared mysteriously: 1910–1990
