= Disappearance of Martha Jean Lambert =

1985 missing person case in Florida, U.S.

Martha Jean Lambert
- Photograph of Martha Lambert
- Born: Martha Jean Lambert; March 26, 1973
- Disappeared: November 27, 1985 (aged 12); St. Augustine, Florida
- Status: Missing for 40 years, 11 months and 7 days
- Mother: Margaret Ann Lambert-Pichon

Martha Jean Lambert (born March 26, 1973), was a 12-year-old Florida girl, who disappeared from St. Augustine, Florida on November 27, 1985. She has not been seen since and foul play is highly suspected in the case. Authorities also believe that her brother, David, may have accidentally killed Martha after an argument; however, this is less likely.

== Background ==
Martha was born on March 26, 1973. She was described as a kind and shy girl who loved to spend time at friends' houses. However, Martha's life was not perfect. Her father, Howard (1913–1995), was an alcoholic who is said to have had an explosive temper; her mother, Margaret (born 1952), was often fighting with Howard, and her brother expressed odd behavior. Due to unknown reasons, possibly child abuse, Martha and her brother spent much of their young lives in foster care and many different homes.

Despite Martha's small stature, she was known to have a strong-willed personality and was hard to ignore. Martha was the peacekeeper between her two older brothers and got along with them. Martha enjoyed spending time with her mother, who referred to Martha as her "best friend." Martha enjoyed attending church; she also liked school, but had poor grades at the time of her disappearance; she also liked to eat fried potatoes and spaghetti, listen to country music, and had an interest in soccer. She was also said to have loved her family and was excited for Thanksgiving of 1985 because she would be spending the day with her family at her grandmother's house. In an unfortunate coincidence, Martha's disappearance occurred the night before Thanksgiving.

== Disappearance ==
Martha, who was a 7th grader at the time of her disappearance, was last seen on November 27, 1985. She had attended her classes at Ketterlinus Junior High School, and when school concluded for the day, she went to a friend's residence for some time afterward. She then left the friend's house to return to her own home on Kerri Lynn Road in St. Augustine at approximately 7:30 p.m. What exactly occurred after she left her friends house that evening is unknown, as her family gave varying stories of events that night. Martha was reported missing at 3:00 a.m. on November 28, 1985 (Thanksgiving Day) when no one could find her.

Martha is described as a Caucasian female, with blonde hair and blue eyes. She stood approximately 4 feet 5 inches and weighed 70 pounds; she has birthmarks on her upper left chest and on the front of her right thigh, her top front teeth slightly protrude. Martha was last known to be wearing a short-sleeved summer dress and/or a two-piece matching bathing suit.

== Investigation ==
Authorities started to search for Martha immediately following her disappearance. Areas along State Road 207 and areas in Kerri Lynn Road were searched. Nothing was found and the case was starting to turn cold. Despite this, authorities never gave up hope of finding her. Since the day Martha vanished, her mother Margaret believes that she was kidnapped and taken from the area. According to Margaret, on the night of Martha's disappearance, she and her daughter were at a social gathering when Martha said "Mom, I'm going over, I’ll be back in five minutes.” but never returned. When Margaret noticed that a substantial amount of time passed and Martha hadn't returned, she went out looking for her. She reported her missing later in the evening.

Authorities questioned everyone in the area, with some neighbors stating that they had seen Martha walking west on Kerri Lynn Road later that night. Others also reported that they had seen a suspicious green van being driven in the area; it was the only vehicle that was not native to the area, and was apparently spotted soon after Martha left. Her brother, David Lambert, gave varying stories as to what occurred that night; he once stated that he saw Martha getting into a black vehicle. Authorities said the story did not hold up. David would then go on to say that he and Martha were having dinner that night when Martha said she was going out. When he asked where, Martha told him it was none of his concern and she refused to divulge her destination. She left and David watched as Martha walked off into the dark. Martha's case was initially considered a runaway but authorities believe that Martha was met with foul play and is very likely deceased.

== Abduction theory ==
Many, including Martha's mother, believed that she was abducted by someone outside of the family while outside. Authorities also suspected this and have investigated the possibility of a stranger abduction with great lengths but no clues emerged despite extensive searches and investigations. No one was ever named as her kidnapper and no one has ever been arrested in connection with her disappearance. Several possible suspects have been named in the case but there was no evidence in the case to prove that they had anything to do with her disappearance. Margaret remains hopeful that her daughter may still be alive. Many agencies online continue to classify Martha as a non-family abduction case.

== David Lambert ==
David Allen Lambert, the middle child of the Lambert family, has always been mentioned in the case. He has given many varying statements to police over the years regarding his sister's disappearance. David at one point stated that Martha was alive and had contacted him and was going to contact the authorities working on her case, but this never occurred. Investigators believed that David was hiding something and that he knows more about Martha's disappearance than he let on. He was fourteen years old in 1985.

== The confessions ==
In 2000, when David was arrested for attempting to pass a bad check, he told authorities that he was responsible for Martha's death and stated he buried her in a coquina mine known as "The Pitts" on Holmes Boulevard. The mine was searched but investigators did not find Martha's body. He could not be charged at that time due to lack of evidence.

In 2009, he once again confessed to killing Martha. He told authorities that on November 27, 1985, he and Martha left the Lambert home because their parents got into a fight over burned turkey. They then went to a Lil Champs convenience store; according to David, he had over $20 with him. Martha spent a little over $4 and gave him the change. He then stated that he and Martha then went to the abandoned Florida Memorial College, which was near the Lambert residence, to pass the time. David said that he and Martha got into a fight because he denied Martha's request for another $20, Martha then allegedly slapped David across the face, and in response, he pushed her; David then said that he pushed Martha so hard that she fell onto the ground and hit her head on a piece of metal.

It is believed by authorities that Martha may have been killed by the impact of her head hitting the metal; however, this is not fully known. David further confessed that when he realized what had happened, he pulled Martha up and noticed a large hole in the back of her head and blood was pouring out. He called for help, hoping someone would hear him and rush to help Martha, but no one heard him. David was growing scared of what his parents would do to him if they discovered what he had done to Martha, so by using the broken piece of a road sign, he dug a 3-foot makeshift grave and placed Martha in the hole, and returned home.

== Aftermath ==
External image
- Age progression depicting Lambert at 29

Authorities were certain that David was telling the truth about his sister's death. Due to authorities believing Martha's death was an accident, along with David being fifteen at the time and the fact that manslaughter charges had a statute of limitations at the time of Martha's disappearance (which had expired by the time of his confession), David Lambert will not face charges for Martha's disappearance. Martha's case was closed, but authorities have stated that the investigation can be reopened if new information comes in. Their mother Margaret remains convinced that Martha was kidnapped and has stated that David often tells fabricated stories to get attention.

In January 2010, David recanted his 2009 confession and stated that he did not know what happened to Martha. He stated that he has long-standing emotional and mental problems. He's also mentioned the possibility that Martha could still be alive. Investigators and forensic teams spent two days searching the grounds where the college once stood but could not find Martha's body, however, construction and demolition of the area in the years since her disappearance may have moved the grave.

To date, Martha's remains have never been recovered, meaning that there may in fact be a slim chance that she is still alive. Authorities hope to find her and have since collected DNA samples and entered them into the National Missing and Unidentified Persons Systems (NamUs) database. Her dental records have also been coded and entered into national databases. There is still hope that Martha's case can be solved and that she can be recovered, whether deceased or living.

Howard Lambert, Martha's father, died on May 29, 1995 at the age of 82. Howard was almost forty years older than his wife, Margaret. Following his death, Margaret remarried and is now known as Margaret Pichon; she continues to search for answers relating to Martha's disappearance, believing that Martha was a victim of a random attack. Meanwhile, authorities maintain their belief that David accidentally killed Martha, but have never pressed charges against him. David has not spoken publicly about his sister's disappearance since he recanted his 2009 confession in January 2010.

== See also ==
- List of people who disappeared mysteriously: post-1970
