= A6 disappearances =

Series of unsolved disappearances in France

The A6 disappearances (French: disparues de l'A6, literally the "[female] disappeared of the A6") is the name given to a number of mysterious disappearances or other crimes involving women and girls, occurring in the 1980s, 1990s and 2000s along a 200-kilometer (120-mile) stretch of the A6 motorway around Mâcon, Chalon-sur-Saône and Montceau-les-Mines, France. The area has been informally referred to as the "triangle of fear" (French: triangle de la peur). The crimes took place between 20 August 1984 and 2 April 2005. All known victims were females aged between 13 and 37 who disappeared suddenly in the département of Saône-et-Loire in east-central France, all along a 200 km stretch of the A6 between Mâcon, Chalon-sur-Saône and Montceau-les-Mines. Although the police have solved some of the murders, they are unsure of whether the remaining unsolved cases are coincidences or the work of one or more serial killers.

== Victims ==
=== Françoise Bruyère and Marie-Agnès Cordonnier ===
On 20 August 1984, cousins Françoise Bruyère and Marie-Agnès Cordonnier, both 22, were last seen trying to hitchhike from Mâcon to Aix-les-Bains. They were never found.

=== Sylvie Aubert ===
On 14 November 1986, Sylvie Aubert, a 22-year-old cashier working at a supermarket in Chalon-sur-Saône, disappeared after she left her workplace. Her severely decomposed body was recovered five months later, on 4 April 1987, from the river Dheune. Her body was naked, her wrists were bound by wire, and she had been strangled.

=== Christelle Maillery ===
On 18 December 1986, 16-year-old Christelle Maillery was murdered in Le Creusot. She had been stabbed 33 times 200 meters from her home in the cellar of a social housing project.

=== Marthe Buisson ===
On 15 August 1987, the body of Marthe Buisson, 16, was found alongside the emergency lane on the A6. According to several eyewitnesses, she was thrown from a "big white car" which shattered her skull.

=== Nathalie Maire ===
On 2 September 1987, Nathalie Maire, 18, was found dead at her workplace. She had been beaten with a broomstick and strangled with an extension cord. A man was seen by a witness leaving the scene in a white vehicle. He was never found. Maire had testified in connection with the murder of Buisson.

=== Carole Soltysiak ===
The naked and partially burned body of 13-year-old Carole Soltysiak was discovered in a forest near Montceau-les-Mines on 18 November 1990. She had been stabbed four times in the chest. However, evidence suggested that strangulation was the cause of death. The autopsy revealed that she had been intoxicated before being assaulted. Isolated traces of semen were also found on her body. The semen contained no spermatozoa, meaning her attacker was infertile. The DNA was neither a match to serial killer Francis Heaulme nor to two other suspects who were known to be in the area at the time.

=== Christelle Blétry ===
The body of 16-year-old Christelle Blétry was found on 18 December 1996, by a postman a few hours after she was last seen, on the edge of a country road in Blanzy. Her body was in a ditch, and she had been stabbed 123 times. The autopsy showed no evidence of sexual assault.

=== Virginie Bluzet ===
Virginie Bluzet, a 21-year-old from Beaune disappeared in February 1997. Bluzet's body was found on 17 March 1997, on the banks of the river Saône in Verdun-sur-le-Doubs, having spent five weeks in the water. She had been found bound and gagged, and her head had been covered by a pillow. The investigation into her death was relaunched in February 2010, following advances in forensic technology. Dijon police had investigated Bluzet's boyfriend, but the magistrate closed this line of inquiry on 6 November 2002, due to a lack of evidence. Michel Bluzet, Virginie's father, stated: "A spot of blood was found on the gag, and despite all the years that have passed, we know that more evidence can be found; I've got my fingers crossed."

=== Vanessa Thiellon ===
The body of 17-year-old apprentice chef Vanessa Thiellon was found on 5 June 1999, on the banks of the Saône in Mâcon. She had been violently beaten and had died from an overdose. She did not appear to have been sexually assaulted.

=== Anne-Sophie Girollet ===
Anne-Sophie Girollet, a 20-year-old medical student, disappeared on 19 March 2005, after a dance party in Mâcon. Girollet obtained her baccalauréat at 17 and was already in her third year at medical school in Lyon. Her body was found floating in the Saône on 2 April, near a bridge in Mâcon. The medical examiners concluded that she had been sexually assaulted before being strangled, suffocating as a result of being stabbed in the chest.

== Convictions ==
=== Jacky Martin: Anne-Sophie Girollet ===
Jacky Martin, a man who was already on the FNAEG (France's DNA database) due to convictions for violent crimes, theft and handling stolen vehicles, was arrested in 2012 after his car, a Peugeot 405 registered to the Rhône département (where Lyon is located), was fished from the Saône and found to contain genetic traces of Girollet. Martin was sentenced to 30 years' imprisonment (to serve a minimum of 20 years before being considered for parole) for the abduction and murder of Girollet. He has appealed the verdict.

=== Jean-Pierre Mura: Christelle Maillery ===
The judicial inquiry into Maillery's murder was officially reopened in 2005. Jean-Pierre Mura, then aged 44, was arrested and questioned. Dozens of knives were discovered at his home. Their blades were compared to the blade of the knife found at the crime scene (the knife itself had been destroyed, but photographs of it still existed). "The blades seized and the blade in the photograph had been sharpened by the same grinder and by the same person or persons." The expert's report highlighted "four common points featuring sharpening marks" that had been made by the grinder, similar to the manner in which ballistics experts compare traces that a bullet leaves the barrel of the gun from which it is fired. These facts, as well as witness statements, led to the magistrate charging the suspect with murder (known in French law as "voluntary homicide") on 15 December 2011. He was held on remand at the prison in Varennes-le-Grand.

Before his arrest by the Dijon Judicial Police, Mura had been held in a psychiatric hospital near Chalon-sur-Saône. At the request of a close relative and on medical advice, he had been detained under mental health legislation at a hospital in Sevrey by way of a decree from the prefect of the département. In December 1986, Mura, then a 19-year-old metalworker from the nearby town of Le Creusot, was already a father to a young daughter. He spent most of his time loitering around an impoverished block of flats called Les Charmilles, near the council estate where Maillery lived. As a teenager, Mura had taken part in burglaries from basements of properties on the estate. He was also known to take drugs and drink a lot of alcohol. Mura was sentenced to 20 years' imprisonment by the Court of Assizes in Chalon-sur-Saône. He appealed the sentence to the Court of Appeal in Dijon, but this court agreed with the original sentence handed down, despite believing that Mura was showing early stages of schizophrenia when he committed the murder.

=== Pascal Jardin: Christelle Blétry ===
In 2001, Marie-Rose and Gilles Blétry travelled to Paris and met with legal investigator Corinne Herrmann, who agreed to take their case as an advocate. It turned out that Blétry's clothes had not been tested for DNA. At first authorities denied the family’s request for testing, saying it was too expensive, and insisting no sexual assault had occurred because Christelle was found fully dressed.

Years laters, a new judge accepted Herrmann's request. In 2014, a DNA from semen found on the victim matched a police database sample, and it belonged to then 54-year-old Pascal Jardin.

Jardin was sentenced on February 2, 2017 to 20 years imprisonment for the rape and murder of Christelle Blétry, and the sentence was upheld on appeal.

== See also ==
- List of fugitives from justice who disappeared
- List of solved missing person cases: 1950–1999
