= Disappearance of Nyleen Marshall =

1983 disappearance of an American girl

Nyleen Marshall
- Born: Nyleen Kay Briscoe; September 18, 1978; Orange, California, U.S.
- Disappeared: June 25, 1983 (aged 4); Helena National Forest, Montana, U.S.
- Status: Missing for 43 years, 3 months and 3 days
- Known for: Missing person
- Height: 3 ft 2 in (0.97 m)
- Parents: William Roy Briscoe (father); Nancy Marshall (mother)
- Relatives: Kim Marshall (step-father) Kena Foster (half-sister)

Nyleen Kay Marshall (née Briscoe; September 18, 1978 – disappeared June 25, 1983) is an American girl who disappeared under mysterious circumstances in the Elkhorn Mountains in the Helena National Forest near Helena, Montana. Two years after her disappearance, the National Center for Missing & Exploited Children, other missing person non-profits, as well as Marshall's family, received phone calls and letters from an anonymous man claiming to have abducted Marshall. In the letters and phone calls, the man detailed sexual abuse but alleged that Marshall was safe and had traveled the world with him. The identity of the anonymous caller and writer is unknown.

Marshall's disappearance has received coverage from the NBC series Unsolved Mysteries, as well as television figure Nancy Grace.

== Disappearance ==
On June 25, 1983, four-year-old Nyleen Kay Marshall attended a picnic with her family at a campground in the Helena National Forest near Helena, Montana. At approximately 4:00 p.m., Marshall was playing with other children who had walked ahead of her near the beaver dams on Maupin Creek. When they turned around, Marshall was nowhere to be seen.

== Investigation ==
=== Search efforts ===
Law enforcement extensively searched the campground and area where Marshall was last seen, but their attempts to locate her were fruitless. A man wearing a jogging suit was allegedly seen in the area this day, and Marshall was seen speaking to him, though it is unknown if he was involved. The Federal Bureau of Investigation as well as various volunteers searched the area, including abandoned mine shafts. Members of the local LDS Church, of which the Marshalls were also members, helped with the search.

=== Phone calls and letters ===
On November 27, 1985, two years after Marshall's disappearance, an anonymous phone call was placed to the National Missing and Unidentified Persons System from a man claiming to have abducted Marshall. Two months later, in early 1986, a typewritten letter was sent to law enforcement in Wisconsin from an anonymous man claiming he had picked up "a girl named Kay." This letter included details about Marshall's disappearance that had never been released to the public; one detective described him as being "privy to things that a normal person would not have access to." The writer of the letter explained that he had a good "investment income" and worked from home, where he homeschooled Kay. He also claimed to travel frequently with her throughout the United States, Canada, and the United Kingdom. He claimed that though he knew her family missed her, he loved her and could not return her. The letter was postmarked from Madison, Wisconsin. Around the same time, an anonymous caller claiming to be the writer of the letter placed several phone calls to Child Find of America, a national missing children's non-profit organization in New York.

The phone calls made to Child Find were traced to several phone booths, including one located near a pharmacy in Edgerton, Wisconsin. Law enforcement disclosed that information relayed from the caller and in the letter suggested Marshall was a victim of sexual abuse.

Excerpts of the letters that were shown during the case's 1990 airing on Unsolved Mysteries read:

Excerpt 1

I didn't want their person to try to get information from her. All I could tell them was that she was OK. I hope Child Find can get the following back to her family.

I picked "Kay" up on the road in the Elkhorn Park area between Helena and Boulder. She was crying and frightened and as I held her she was shaking and I decided that I would keep her and love her. I took her home with me.

I have a nice investment income and I can work at home so I care for her myself all the time. I teach her at home and she likes to go with me when I travel.

Her hair is short and curly now and she has really grown. She is about 45 inches and around 50 pounds. She has all four of her permanent upper and two of her lower incisors at this time. She takes a bath and brushes her teeth every day.

She eats well. Her favorite meal is pizza and Cherry

Excerpt 2

[S]he would gladly recount to you trips to San Francisco, New York, Oklahoma City, New Orleans, Nashville, Chicago, Puerto Rico and Canada. We were even in Britain for a month last year and she loved it. (Nobody questions passports.)

Excerpt 3

[I]t is or where it comes from, only that I get it from the bathroom every morning. It is actually a spoonful of my semen. It doesn't affect her physically. I have NEVER "molested" her in any other way. She is a sweet little girl and it is because of how much I have grown to love her that I realize how much her family must miss her. But she has adjusted and seems happy. She trusts me and isn't afraid. We play alot [sic] and she laughs when we clown around. She smiles and acts coy when I tease her. She giggles when we snuggle and hugs me sometimes for no apparent reason. I love her and I have her. I just can't let her go!

Sometime after the receipt of the letters and phone calls, a witness claimed to have seen a girl resembling Marshall at a restaurant in Janesville, Wisconsin. After the receipt of the letters, an unnamed individual claimed to have murdered Marshall and disposed of her body in a mine shaft near Helena. The mine shaft, which had since been sealed, was searched to no result.

=== Discovery of Monica Bonilla ===
Incidentally, after the airing of Marshall's case on Unsolved Mysteries in 1990, a tip received from a viewer who believed Marshall may have been one of his school classmates in Bellingham, Washington led to the recovery of Monica Bonilla, a young girl who had gone missing in 1982 from Burbank, California, having been kidnapped by her non-custodial father.

== Aftermath ==
By 1994, the Marshall family had relocated from Montana to Japan. The following year, in 1995, Marshall's mother Nancy was murdered in Mexico.

In 1997, a nurse at a New Orleans hospital reported a potential sighting of Marshall and her abductor. The nurse stated that a 19-year-old woman calling herself "Helena" came into the hospital with an unidentified man in hope of being admitted to give birth. The woman stated she thought her mother may have been named Nyleen, and that she grew up in another country, despite having no trace of an accent. When the staff attempted to ask the duo further questions about their identities and medical history, they quickly left the hospital.

In a 2017 interview, Jefferson County Sheriff Craig Doolittle stated that law enforcement still had no substantial leads in the case.

== See also ==
- List of people who disappeared mysteriously: 1910–1990
