= Disappearance of Tania Murrell =

1983 Canada missing persons case

Tania Murrell
- Murrell prior to her disappearance
- Born: June 20, 1976; Ontario, Canada
- Disappeared: January 20, 1983 (aged 6); Grovenor Elementary School, Edmonton, Alberta, Canada
- Status: Missing for 43 years, 7 months and 22 days
- Height: 3 ft 6 in (107 cm)
- Parents: Jack Murrell (father); Vivian Murrell (mother)

On January 20, 1983, Tania Marie Murrell, a six-year-old girl from Edmonton, Alberta, Canada, disappeared after walking home for lunch from Grovenor Elementary School. At approximately 11:00 a.m., she left the school and began walking 1.5 blocks toward her family home on 145th Street in west Edmonton. She was reported missing later that day, and she was never seen again.

== Background ==
Tania Marie Murrell was born on June 20, 1976, to her parents Jack and Vivian Murrell. Vivian was a bakery manager, while Jack had worked as a carpenter who built new houses on the west side of Edmonton. The family lived near Niagara Falls in the past, before re-locating to western Canada. Murrell was known for her love of singing and tap dancing, and was known to be a good swimmer. In 1984, the Murrells had another daughter, named Elysia.

== Disappearance ==
On the early morning of January 20, 1983, Murrell's aunt was staying at the house, as she was going to be babysitting the children. The 5-year-old son of the Murrell's, named John Murrell, was dropped off to his kindergarten class, and Tania was dropped off at Grovenor Elementary School, close to 7:30 a.m. According to her fellow classmates, Murrell was last seen leaving her first grade class at around 11:00 a.m. Murrell was wearing a blue and white winter coat, green corduroy pants, a black Harley Davidson T-shirt, and brown boots, and started walking home. This was the last time she was ever spotted alive.

Just after 11 a.m., John walked out of his kindergarten class, expecting to find Tania waiting to join him for the two-block walk home for lunch. He did not see her. Assumed she’d went on without him, he made the 1.5 block trek home himself. John arrived home around 11:20 a.m. He explained that other students had told him that Murrell had gone to a friend’s house for lunch. However, they found her niece was not at the house. Vivian phoned the Edmonton Police Service and an officer stopped by the house, where he made note of what Tania was wearing and began a door-to-door search of the area. John said: "I cried when she didn't come home that night. She was my best friend. We did everything together."

Murrell did not show up for school the next morning and many began to believe something horrible happened to her the previous day. Family and friends reported her missing. Murrell was described as 3 ft 6 in (107 cm) tall, weighing about 45 lb (20 kg), having blonde hair, pierced ears, and brown eyes. The story made both national and international news, with outlets across Canada and the United States reporting on Tania’s disappearance. Her case was the lead story on local newscasts. Police officers, friends, relatives and citizens volunteered for the search of Murrell. Investigators have waded through many documents and tips, but remained empty-handed.

== Suspects ==
Edmonton Police put their suspicion on a 31 year old family friend with a criminal record, sometimes referred to as Uncle L. He had a close relationship with the family, he had no solid alibi, and moved to Ontario shortly after she vanished. He remained the primary person of interest until his death in 2020. Investigators also considered him as a person of interest in the 1979 death of Kevin Reimer. Kevin was 9 years old when he disappeared from Elk Island National Park in Alberta on June 29, 1979.

== Aftermath ==
The disappearance of Murrell is widely considered to be the biggest abduction mystery in Edmonton history. On January 18, 2013, two days before the 30 year anniversary of Murrell's disappearance, detective Howie Antoniuk, said: “I would love nothing better than to solve this case before I retire. It has been so long,” says Antoniuk, who believed Tania has died. However, Antoniuk does admit that Tania could still be alive, using the case of Jaycee Dugard as an example, being a California woman who resurfaced in 2009, 18 years after she was abducted as an 11-year-old girl.

There was no funeral or memorial service as her parents held onto hope their daughter would be found alive. One year later, the Murrell family had another daughter named Elysia. She said that sometimes it was hard growing up, as her mom "kept her on a tight leash", describing her as "very protective". Jack died in 2005, and Vivian died 6 years later in 2011. On January 25, 2015, John Murrell, at the age of 37 years old, less than a week after being featured in an Edmonton Sun article, was found dead in his bedroom at a halfway house apartment he shared with other parolees, near 119 Avenue and 101 Street.

While Elysia grieves the death of her brother, she does not grieve the possible fate of her sister, convinced Murrell is still alive. Elysia is haunted by the possibility "Uncle L" played a role in her sister’s disappearance, but she keeps in regular contact with detectives with the Edmonton Police Service.

On January 20, 2026, 43 years after Murrell's disappearance, an age-progression composite sketch of Murrell was released by Edmonton Police. Police said the composite was created using photographs, known physical characteristics, modern forensic techniques and direct consultation with family. Detective Melanie Grace, with the historical crimes section, said the age-progression image is an investigative tool used in cases where there have been no advancements for decades. She is hoping the composite will jog someone's memory, adding that even small details can be critical.
