= Disappearance of Juan Pedro Martínez =

Case of a missing Spanish child

Juan Pedro Martínez Gómez
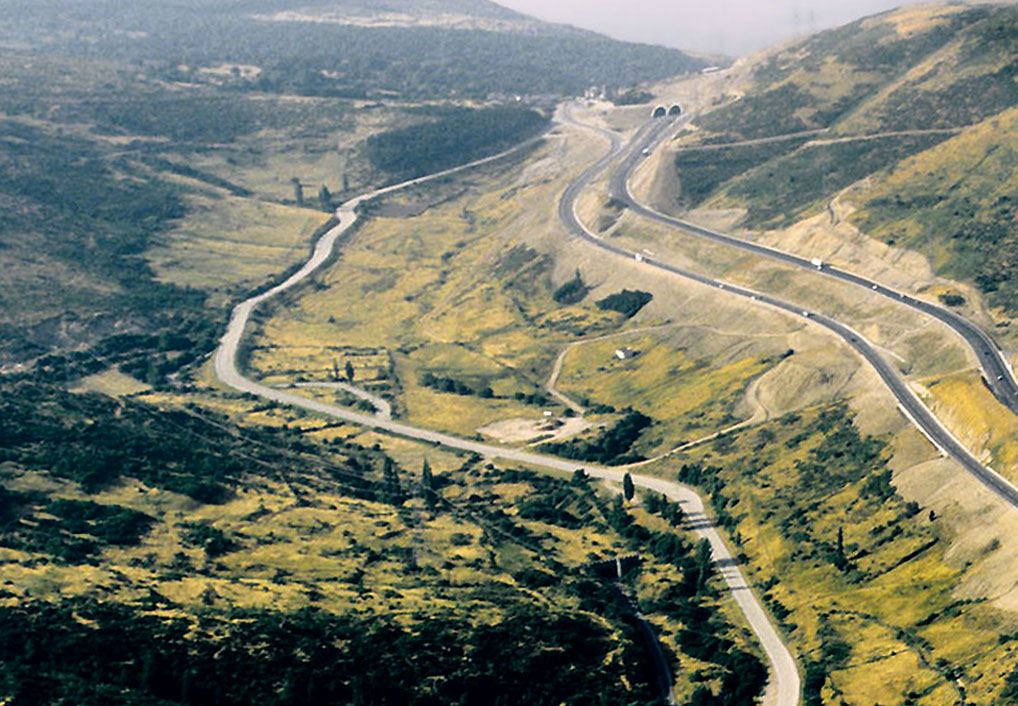
- Somosierra mountain pass in 1993
- Born: Juan Pedro Martínez Gomez; 1976
- Disappeared: 25 June 1986 (aged 10); Somosierra mountain pass, near Somosierra, Community of Madrid, Spain
- Status: Missing for 39 years, 11 months and 11 days
- Parents: Andrés Martínez Navarro; Carmen Gómez Legaz

Juan Pedro Martínez Gómez, also known in Spanish media as El niño de Somosierra ("the Boy from Somosierra"), was a Spanish boy who disappeared near Somosierra, Community of Madrid, on 25 June 1986 during the early morning hours. Juan Pedro, aged 10, was riding with his parents in a tanker loaded with 20,000 litres of sulphuric acid when the vehicle lost control and crashed on the Somosierra mountain pass. Both parents died in the accident, but the child's remains were never found. The case is considered by Interpol to be one of the strangest missing persons cases to have occurred in Europe during the late 20th century.

== Background ==
Juan Pedro's father, Andrés Martínez Navarro, had been commissioned to drive a tanker carrying 20,000 litres of sulphuric acid from the town of Los Cánovas, in the municipality of Fuente Álamo de Murcia, to the northern port city of Bilbao. According to family, Andrés allowed Juan Pedro to accompany him and his mother on the errand as a reward for earning good grades in school. The last reported sighting of the family took place at a restaurant next to the N-1 motorway, near the municipality of Cabanillas de la Sierra.

== Accident ==
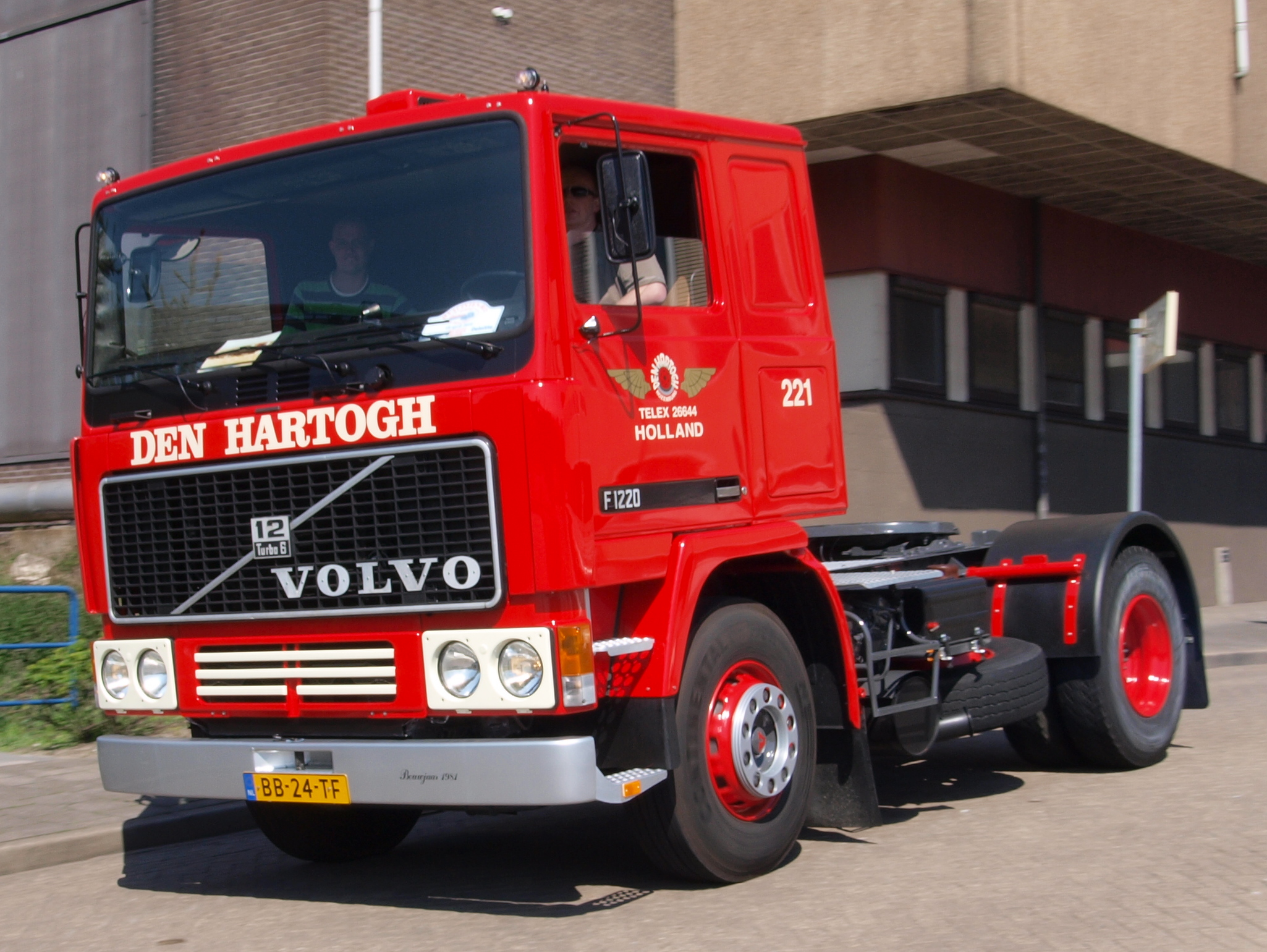
A red Volvo F12, similar to the accident vehicle

During the early morning hours of 25 June 1986, at around 6:30, Andrés' truck, which had been travelling at an excess speed of around 140 km/h, skidded on the curve of the Somosierra mountain pass and overturned. The accident ruptured the cistern containing the sulphuric acid, which washed over and damaged the remains of Juan Pedro's parents. However, the body of Juan Pedro himself was never found at the scene, leading to speculation regarding the child's ultimate fate. All that was found of Juan Pedro at the scene were several clothing items belonging to him.

== Investigation ==
Examination of the truck found that it had not suffered from a breakdown or braking issue. The truck had recently passed a safety inspection and tune-up, which were performed specifically for the trip. Analysis of the truck's tachograph showed that the vehicle had made a total of twelve short stops on the last thirteen-kilometre stretch prior to the accident, without leaving the motorway. The reason for these stops could not be determined; the possibility of a traffic jam was ruled out, as there was little traffic on the motorway during the early morning hours before the accident.

During the dismantling of the truck, trace amounts of heroin were discovered. Neither of Juan Pedro's parents had criminal records for using or distributing illegal drugs. However, the family divulged to investigators that Andrés had been forced to transport heroin to northern Spain by a local drug smuggling ring. This information significantly shifted the investigators' view of the case, causing them to speculate that Juan Pedro had been abducted in order to protect the boy from a reprisal by the smuggling ring.

== Theories ==
It was initially speculated by police that the leaked acid had thoroughly dissolved Juan Pedro's body. However, this possibility was ruled out due to the quick action by local emergency services, which prevented the dissolution of his parents' corpses. Furthermore, complete dissolution by sulphuric acid requires that a human body be completely submerged in the compound.

After the heroin discovery, police theorised that another vehicle, containing criminals affiliated with the smuggling ring, had been following Andrés' truck in order to monitor his progress. The theory holds that the accident was due to nerves on the part of Andrés, or the result of an attempted pursuit by Andrés after his son had been kidnapped as a form of collateral. Such a scenario would explain the truck's tachograph readings.

A similar theory, put forward by eyewitnesses at the scene, pointed to a foreign-accented couple–a tall, middle-aged man and an elderly woman claiming to be a nurse–who arrived at the scene of the accident in a white Nissan Vanette. According to these accounts, the couple searched the truck, removed a bundle that may have been Juan Pedro, loaded the bundle into the van, and quickly drove away. Police investigated more than 3,000 vans matching this description, but failed to yield conclusive results.

== See also ==
- List of people who disappeared mysteriously: 1910–1990
- Disappearance of the Sodder children
