= Disappearance of Charles Horvath-Allan =

Canadian unsolved disappearance case

Charles Horvath-Allan
- Born: Charles Karoly John Horvath-Allan; August 21, 1968; Cochenour, Ontario
- Disappeared: May 26, 1989 (aged 20); Kelowna, British Columbia
- Status: Missing for 36 years, 10 months and 12 days
- Parents: Max A K Horvath Sr. (father); Denise Horvath-Allan (mother)

Charles Kj Horvath-Allan (born August 21, 1968) is a Canadian born British national who went missing whilst hiking across Canada in 1989. He disappeared from the city of Kelowna in British Columbia, Canada, leaving his tent and personal effects behind. According to the Royal Canadian Mounted Police (RCMP), the case is still an open investigation.

== Disappearance ==
Horvath-Allan had been visiting his father and godfather in Ontario before hiking and backpacking across Canada when he arrived on the 3 May 1989 in the city of Kelowna in British Columbia. He had been staying at a local hostel, the homes of friends and the Tiny Tent Town Campsite + RV Park located at 3316 Lakeshore Road, V1W 3T1, near to route 97 in the city. He was registered at various student employment agencies during May 1989. He was last positively identified on the 26 May 1989 cashing a cheque at the Orchard Park Royal Bank. He was due to meet up with his mother and step-father in Hong Kong for his 21st birthday and his mother's 40th in August 1989. He last contacted his parents by fax on 11 May 1989 but failed to contact them again to enable his mother to purchase his ticket for travel to Hong Kong. A missing persons listing for Horvath-Allan noted that he left behind his tent and personal belongings and that foul play is suspected. One source claims that they met Horvath-Allan in May 1989 and allowed him to stay at their home in Kelowna. The same source claims they saw him alive in the Live Wire nightclub in August 1989, but this claim is unverified.

== Investigation ==
Denise Horvath-Allan telephoned the Kelowna Detachment of the RCMP asking for their help in locating her son as she was anxious as she had not received an expected call from him in May 1989. After several more calls to the RCMP, Denise Horvath-Allan reported Charles missing on the 10 August 1989.

The Royal Canadian Mounted Police launched a search of the area inside the campsite in July 1990, after Denise Horvath-Allan advised them that Charles had been camping at Tiny Tent Town. The RCMP retrieved some of Charles' clothing and a shaving bag from a 1989 Tiny Town resident.

In 1989 the manager had given 3 small items to Charles' mother when she visited the campsite enquiring about Charles, a rosary, a tiny red paper Bible and a leather strap from Charles' boot which had been kept in the shed for more than a year. The manager said that Charles' tent, other belongings, personal photographs and his ID had been thrown away in the Spring of 1990.

Police have stated they have an open mind about the disappearance of Horvath-Allan; Constable Kris Clark said "There's obviously concern after so many years of not being in contact with somebody, whether it's a recovery at this point or not." They have stated that the file will remain open until Horvath-Allan is located.

== Subsequent events ==
Horvath-Allan's mother made over 15 trips to Kelowna over the following decades in order to search for her son Charles, meet with police, hand out posters, talk with employers and residents in the city and across Canada. She sold her hair and beauty salon to finance the ongoing search and air fares to Canada.

On one such trip to Canada in March 1992, Denise Horvath-Allan received two anonymous letters delivered by taxi whilst staying at The Pandosy Inn Motel, detailing how her son had been partying at Tiny Tent Town with locals and had gotten into a fight where he was subsequently killed. His body was then dumped into Lake Okanagan.

This led local volunteer divers to go into Lake Okanagan and search for three days. Vancouver based 'International Sea Search' (ISS) aided with a submersible camera and its volunteer team to search beneath the old Floating Bridge for a further three days. The RCMP joined the search on day five of the six day search.

On Friday 3 April 1992 at 10:14 whilst the RCMP Divers were not present, ISS located a male body and the police were called. The RCMP attended the scene at 10:17am; their divers went into the lake, recovered the body and brought it to the surface. It was believed to be that of an elderly gentleman who had committed suicide at the lake seven years earlier.

In September 1995, the police found a decomposed body in the logging country around Kelowna. Horvath-Allan's family waited for six weeks to be told that the body found was not of their son. At that time, the police hadn't contacted Mrs. Allan or any family member about the find of the dead body; the family were informed via friends and relatives who had seen reports in the local press.

In 2010, she rented billboard space with posters appealing for information. That year, the Serious Crime Unit of the RCMP at Kelowna listed Horvath-Allan as deceased. Since Charles' disappearance, his father, godfathers and grandparents have died and his mother said that her 2015 trip would likely be her last because of her health and the financial burden of flying to Canada.

In August 2020, the High Court in the United Kingdom declared Horvath-Allan legally dead under the Presumption of Death Act 2013.

== Theories ==
Denise Horvath-Allan believes her son died in the summer of 1989. "How and by what means I don't know but something terrible happened to him that prevented him from calling home," she said. "I want to know where his remains are. I want him to be laid to rest with his beloved Nana in Cambridge, England."

== See also ==
- List of people who disappeared mysteriously: post-1970
