= Disappearance of Piia Ristikankare =

Finnish unsolved missing person case

Piia Ristikankare
- Born: Piia Irmeli Ristikankare; December 18, 1972; Piikkiö, Finland
- Disappeared: October 7, 1988 (aged 15); Piikkiö, Finland
- Status: Missing for 38 years and 13 days

Locations
1 Last known sighting, located at Peipontie 4 in Piikkiö
2 Ponto youth club, Pontelanmäki 5, 21500 Piikkiö, Finland

Piia Irmeli Ristikankare (born 18 December 1972) was a 15-year-old girl from Piikkiö, Finland who disappeared on 7 October 1988. Her disappearance is among the most famous unresolved disappearance cases in Finland.

== Disappearance ==
7 October was a normal Friday school day for Ristikankare, who was studying housekeeping at a vocational school. She had arranged a sleepover with a friend in Paimio, but had to cancel it because her 3-year-old brother needed a babysitter that night. Piia's parents were divorced and her mother had moved out of the family home a couple of years earlier.

On the night of the disappearance, the family's father was in the sauna with his father-in-law while Piia Ristikankare was spending time with her brothers, aged 3 and 14. The teenagers got into an argument over television programmes and Piia went out, probably taking a small bag with some money in it with her. She has not been seen since.

== Investigation ==
A specific registration white Volvo 240 was investigated to no avail following an anonymous letter tip-off

Several clues to the case have been reported and false sightings of Piia Ristikankare were also made after her disappearance. The case was taken over by the National Bureau of Investigation in 2003. According to a childhood friend, Piia had been bullied at school because of the family's religious orientation. The Ristikankare family are Jehovah's Witnesses. They continued living in the house from which Piia Ristikankare disappeared after the disappearance, despite several police raids.

Piia Ristikankare was officially declared deceased in absentia in 2011. The date of her death was marked as 1 January 2011.

== See also ==
- List of people who disappeared mysteriously (2000–present)
