= Death of Doris Girtz =

Unidentified female decedent

Doris Girtz
- High school photograph of Girtz taken in 1971
- Born: May 1955 (approximate)
- Status: Identity announced on June 20, 2025
- Died: c. January 1979 (aged 23)
- Body discovered: June 20, 1979; Watts Township, Perry County, Pennsylvania, United States
- Known for: Unidentified decedent
- Height: 5 ft 2 in (1.57 m) (minimum); 5 ft 9 in (1.75 m) (maximum)

Doris Joanne Girtz (May 1955 - c. January 1979) previously known as the Perry County Jane Doe, and also nicknamed "Girl with the Turquoise Jewelry" is a formerly unidentified decedent whose body was found on June 20, 1979, in Watts Township, Perry County, Pennsylvania, near the Juniata River. The cause of her death is not known, but it was considered to be suspicious by the authorities. Her name was not known for 46 years, despite efforts to identify her. She was the only unidentified decedent in the county.

She underwent genetic genealogy by Othram. Exactly 46 years after her discovery, Girtz's identification was formally announced. In July 2025, Perry County Coroner Robert Ressler announced the successful identification of Girtz.

== Description ==
The badly decomposed remains were found by a stonemason alongside a river, near a highway in Perry County, Pennsylvania, near Watts Township. The remains were mostly skeletonized and the estimated time of death was months before, perhaps as early as the autumn of 1978.

Analysis lead to estimates that the victim had been likely between 15 and 30 years old when she died, possibly as old as 38. She was white, had straight or possibly curly, shoulder-length blond or light brown hair. She was between 5 feet 2 inches (1.57 m) and 5 feet 9 inches (1.75 m) tall. She weighed between 105 pounds (48 kg) and 125 pounds (57 kg).

She had received dental care during her life, as a back tooth had been removed four or five years prior to her death. She also had teeth fillings. One tooth, which was a molar, had not yet erupted. Her teeth showed no evidence of crowding. Despite that her teeth appeared to have had some dental work, it is not known if she had ever had dental braces.

Prior to her death, she had suffered a fractured rib, which had healed. Just before her death, she may have returned to Pennsylvania after having spent several months in the Southwestern United States. Recent analysis of the decedent's bones indicated that she had spent a long time living in the Midwest or in Southern Canada, near the Great Lakes, when she was an adolescent.

== Belongings ==
Jewelry worn by Perry County Jane Doe.

Perry County Jane Doe wore several pieces of jewelry. She was wearing two sterling silver rings with turquoise stones, one of which also contained onyx pieces that are believed to have originated in the Southwest, possibly having been made by Navajo or Zuni Native Americans inhabiting that area. She also had a chain bracelet on her right arm and a turquoise necklace and earrings. The jewelry led authorities to believe the victim had ties to Arizona, New Mexico or a similar region.

She wore a tan jacket, white boots with silver buckles, green and white socks, and blue slacks. The slacks were described as having been made from knitted wool which contained strands of red thread. She was wearing two tops, which consisted of a white shirt and a blue tank top.

== Investigation ==
The victim had been buried shortly after her discovery, but was exhumed in 2008, following the reopening of her case. Her DNA and dental records were recorded and are on file. Because of the condition of her remains, no fingerprints and no cause of death could be confirmed. An initial examination of her teeth indicated that she had had three teeth extracted, but this was later disproved. Despite the fact that these characteristics have been entered into national databases, there have been no matches with missing persons.

About sixty possible identities for her have been ruled out. Her face was reconstructed twice by professionals. A sketch by Barbara Martin-Bailey was drawn in 2009, and the National Center for Missing and Exploited Children created a three-dimensional rendering by digitally adding layers of muscles and skin to a CT scan of her skull, which was released in 2013. A revised image was later released in 2018.

On September 27, 2023, Othram announced its intention to perform genetic genealogy on the decedent's remains in order to uncover her identity. In July 2025, Perry County Coroner Robert Ressler announced the successful identification of Girtz.

== See also ==
- List of unsolved murders (1900–1979)
- Murder of Ruth Waymire
- Murder of Ruth Marie Terry
