= Baby Doe (disambiguation) =

"Baby Doe" may refer to:

== Individuals ==
- Baby Doe Tabor, (1854–1935) the wife of a wealthy businessman
- Bella Bond, (2012–2015) a previously unidentified toddler discovered dead in Massachusetts in 2015

== Other uses ==
- Baby Doe Law
- Baby Doe (pseudonym), a pseudonym for an unidentified baby
- The Ballad of Baby Doe, an opera based on the life of Baby Doe Tabor
