= Murder of Bella Bond =

2015 homicide of American child in Boston, Massachusetts

Bella Bond
- Bella Bond in 2015
- Born: Bella Neveah Amoroso Bond; August 6, 2012
- Status: Identified after 85 days
- Died: c. May – June 2015 (aged 2); Dorchester, Boston, Massachusetts, U.S.
- Cause of death: Homicide
- Body discovered: June 25, 2015
- Resting place: Winthrop Cemetery
- Other name: "Baby Doe"
- Known for: Former unidentified decedent
- Height: 3 ft 1 in (0.94 m) (minimum); 3 ft 6 in (1.07 m) (maximum)
- Parents: Joe Amoroso (father); Rachelle Bond (mother)

Bella Neveah Amoroso Bond (August 6, 2012 – May or June 2015), previously known as the Deer Island Jane Doe and "Baby Doe", was an American child whose body was found in a plastic bag on the shore of Deer Island in Boston, Massachusetts, on June 25, 2015.

Authorities pursued numerous leads of investigation into discovering the child's identity until their efforts proved successful in September 2015. This publicity generated many tips with possible leads, one of which led to the girl's identity. Bella Bond was identified on September 18, 2015.

The National Center for Missing & Exploited Children facially reconstructed the child's face to provide the public with an estimation of the victim's appearance during life. They aimed to generate tips to a potential identity and to locate the individual or individuals responsible for the disposal of her body. After the reconstruction was released and news coverage began nationwide, a large amount of public attention emerged; an estimated 56 million people viewed reports on the case. Half of these occurred within the first week after the body was found.

Bond's mother, Rachelle Bond, and her boyfriend, Michael McCarthy, were arrested, and authorities confirmed that Bella had been murdered, despite the fact that an initial autopsy performed on the body did not uncover the exact cause of death.

Rachelle Bond was charged with being an "accessory after the fact" in regards to her daughter's murder; she later pleaded guilty as the result of a plea deal. McCarthy was charged with murder in the case and was later convicted of murder in the second degree. On June 28, 2017, he was sentenced to life imprisonment with future parole.

== Discovery ==
The body of Bella Bond was found inside a plastic garbage bag on the shoreline of Deer Island near Boston, Massachusetts. A woman walking her dog made the discovery of Bond's remains on the afternoon of June 25, 2015, when the dog stopped at the plastic bag. After the body was found, the public placed flowers near the scene. She wore only a pair of white leggings designed with a black polka-dot pattern. A zebra-print blanket was also inside the bag. Initially, police were unsure if additional bodies would be at the scene, so they attempted unsuccessfully to use cadaver dogs to locate any other possible remains.

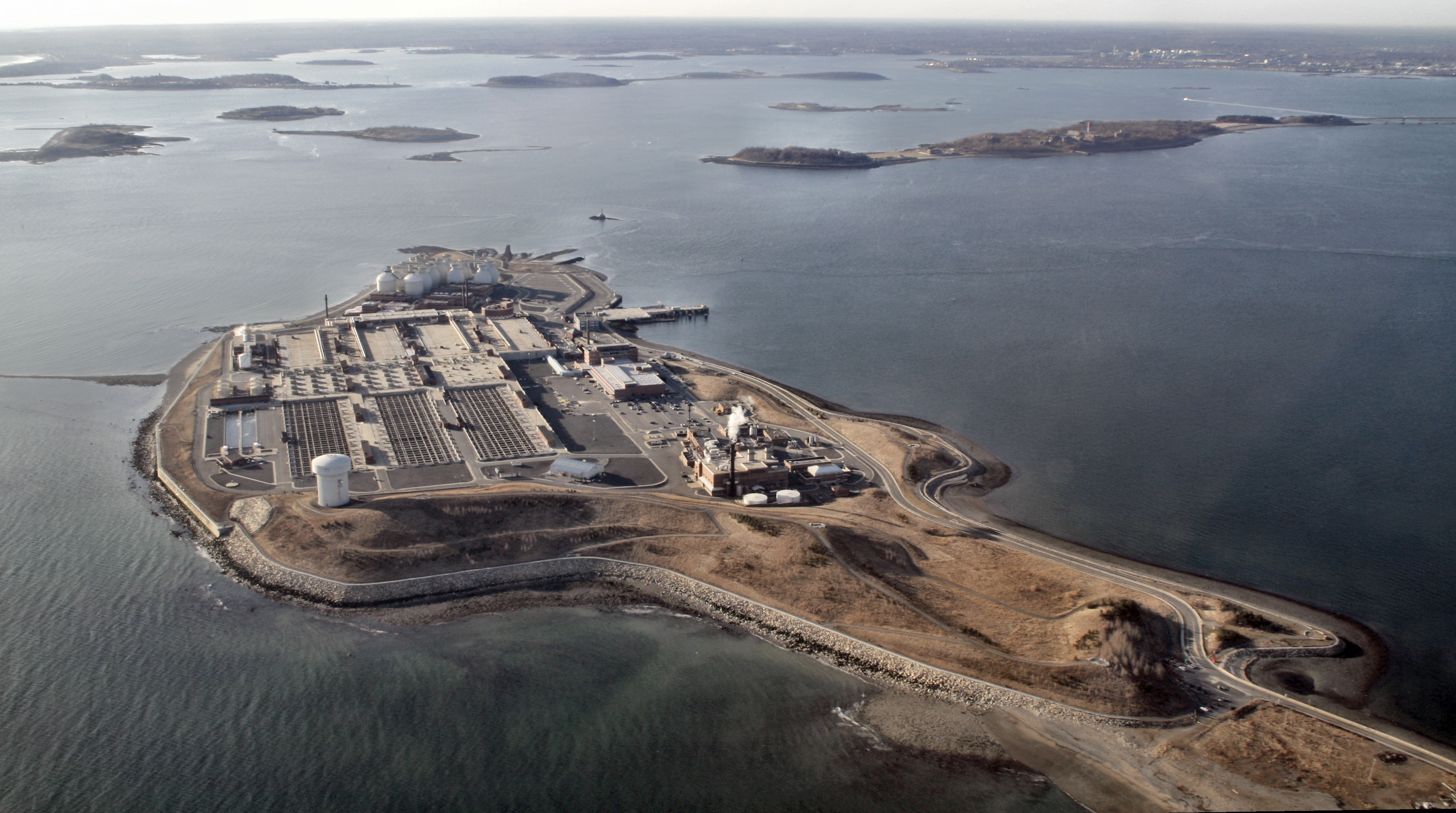
Deer Island—the body of Bella Bond was discovered at this location on June 25, 2015

Authorities originally estimated that the girl had died within days of her discovery. Later developments in the case have suggested that Bella's body had been "hidden in a fridge" for as long as one month before it was deposited on Deer Island. Despite the fact that she appeared to have been deceased only a short time, she had already begun to decompose and become bloated, which made it impossible to identify her visually. Decomposition had also made it impossible to collect fingerprints, due to exposure to the water. Investigators were able to conclude that she was a young child, but were initially unsure of her race and ethnicity.

Just how the remains had settled at the location was unknown; the body might either have been placed at the beach or may have drifted in the water from another location, some presuming from as far away as Canada. The United States Coast Guard entered the investigation and analyzed the currents of the water in the area to estimate where the bag containing the remains could have originated. Dive teams were also used around the time the body was discovered. As of mid-July and August, authorities believed the victim had been placed at the scene, rather than washing onto Deer Island from another location, because the body was not in an advanced enough stage of decomposition. The beach is near a wastewater treatment plant. One of the investigators thought a possibility existed that the disposal had been performed by an employee of the nearby water-treatment plant. Since the area has been regarded as a "busy" area for both workers and the public, the person who placed the bag at the scene possibly did so at night, to avoid being seen.

== Examination ==
An autopsy was conducted on July 3, but did not conclude what had caused the girl's death. While authorities suspected foul play as a factor in the case, no signs of obvious injury had been found on the remains. Tests were later conducted to find any toxins, drugs, or alcohol present in the body as a possible explanation for the death. Examiners were unable to find any trace of cleaners such as bleach in the remains, but continued with more testing in hopes of finding another toxin as a possible cause of death. After the identification of the victim, a conclusive cause of death had yet to be announced, despite all forms of "natural death [having] been excluded". Suffocation had not been ruled out as the cause.

The clothing found on the toddler, believed to be "size 4T" was determined to have been manufactured by the Circo company and was likely sold at a Target store. The blanket was possibly made by the Cannon Mills company and sold at K-Mart. A hair band made from elastic material was also found.

The child was eventually determined to be between the ages of three and five and appeared to be white, with possible Hispanic ancestry. Her hair was described as being "brown, wavy and fourteen inches in length". Presumably, the child's hair was left untrimmed for about two years, judging by its length. She was also estimated to be between 3 ft 1 in (94 cm) and 3 ft 6 in (107 cm) tall and weighed around 30 pounds (13.6 kg). No distinct birthmarks or scars were on the body. The girl was later discovered to have had pierced ears, so the National Center for Missing and Exploited Children released an updated image of the child wearing earrings. The girl appeared to have been "well-cared for" during her life; no signs of malnutrition or abuse were noted, and investigators stated the clothing also reinforced the theory.

A forensic facial reconstruction of Bella Bond created by the National Center for Missing and Exploited Children. This picture, created using Adobe Photoshop from mortuary photographs, generated a large amount of publicity, with its realistic composition causing some people to mistake it for a photograph.

== Investigation ==
The National Center for Missing and Exploited Children digitally reconstructed the face of the child after preceding attempts to identify the body failed. The reconstruction was created in four hours using Adobe Photoshop with the influence of mortuary and "stock" photographs to give an estimation of the child's appearance while alive. The reconstruction, created by forensic artist Christi Andrews, was released on July 2, 2015—due to its realistic composition, many viewers mistook it for an actual photograph. The organization also digitally enhanced images of the leggings and the blanket found with the remains and created a poster featuring them on their website. Flyers containing images of the Jane Doe and her belongings were eventually dispersed in hopes of obtaining more information. After the child's identification, some individuals who were familiar with the Bonds claimed they did not see a resemblance between the composite and Bella.

The child was entered into the National Missing and Unidentified Persons System on July 4, 2015, including details of the discovery of the subject and physical estimations. Many missing persons were excluded as possible identities; authorities checked Shoshana Black, Paula Ramerez-Figuroa, Ofir Ben–Haim, Cassidy Gibbs, and Ayla Reynolds. Other leads were pursued involving children who were reported missing, some of whom were foreign to the United States. Some of the potential matches were later located alive. The disappearance case of Sarah Hoggle had been analyzed to have a possible link to the case, yet investigators stated it was "unlikely" to have been related to this case. In all, over 200 missing people were ruled out from the case.

A press conference displaying the reconstruction and the enhanced images of the clothing and blanket was later held at the location where the body was found. It was televised to ask the public for assistance identifying the victim and to request of those who may have known her, especially her parents, to identify the girl. During the press conference, officials urged viewers to be aware of children who may have disappeared or gone unaccounted for in the days leading up to the celebration of Independence Day. Despite their hopes, no one came forward to claim responsibility for the crime or to confirm who the victim was. Hundreds of tips were submitted over the phone and online and were investigated.

When searching missing-persons databases produced few cases matching her profile, authorities began to believe that the child may never have been reported missing. They explored the possibility that the family of the child could be unaware of her death. Another explanation for why no matches were achieved was that she could have belonged to an undocumented family. Police were focused on investigating in the local community, yet they believed the girl possibly was not from the area and continued to search through various cases of missing children.

Among other theories about the case, early speculation was that the girl could have been murdered by a member of her family. A criminologist stated that her having been "murdered by a stranger" did not seem likely, according to statistics of similar cases. The fact that no tips from relatives with information about the child had been reported supported the idea that family members were involved with the disposal of the body, and possibly with her death. Investigators feared for other children who may have been in the care of those who disposed of the body, as they could be in danger. A different theory held that the child's family members might also be deceased, having faced a similar demise.

=== Forensic testing ===
Forensics teams analyzed the DNA of Deer Island Jane to exclude some missing persons and in hopes of matching it to possible relatives of the girl whose DNA was on record. It was obtained through samples of hair and a tooth. The DNA did not match the profiles stored in databases of known missing persons. Officials stated that they also sent samples to the University of North Texas to create a more specific profile, a time-consuming process. Mitochondrial DNA from the bones of the child was later developed to compare to possible relatives.

Besides DNA testing, authorities conducted efforts into forensic palynology as well as isotope examination of water found at the scene. Results of the testing indicated that the child had spent time in the local, urban area, most likely in Boston, as traces of both pine and soot were found throughout the tests. Eventually, she was also determined to have possibly spent time in any of the six New England states (Connecticut, Maine, Massachusetts, New Hampshire, Rhode Island, and Vermont) and possibly others. The hair and enamel tests also indicated she could have "moved across the country."

== Public interaction ==
Because the reconstruction and the story had been so widely publicized, an unexpectedly large amount of public interest in the case developed internationally. Many people have since shared and viewed reports detailing the case on social networks, such as Twitter and Facebook. Several individuals offered to pay for the child's funeral and burial if she could not be identified. One funeral home stated that it would donate the means to bury the child under a headstone, so she would not be buried in a pauper's grave. Local businesses in the area began placing posters of the child in their buildings, hoping to create awareness for the case and to generate potential leads. The Massachusetts Water Resources Authority reported plans to donate a bench in memory of the girl. The digital reconstruction had been viewed an estimated 50 million times by the public, which officials have stated was significantly efficient in assisting with the case.

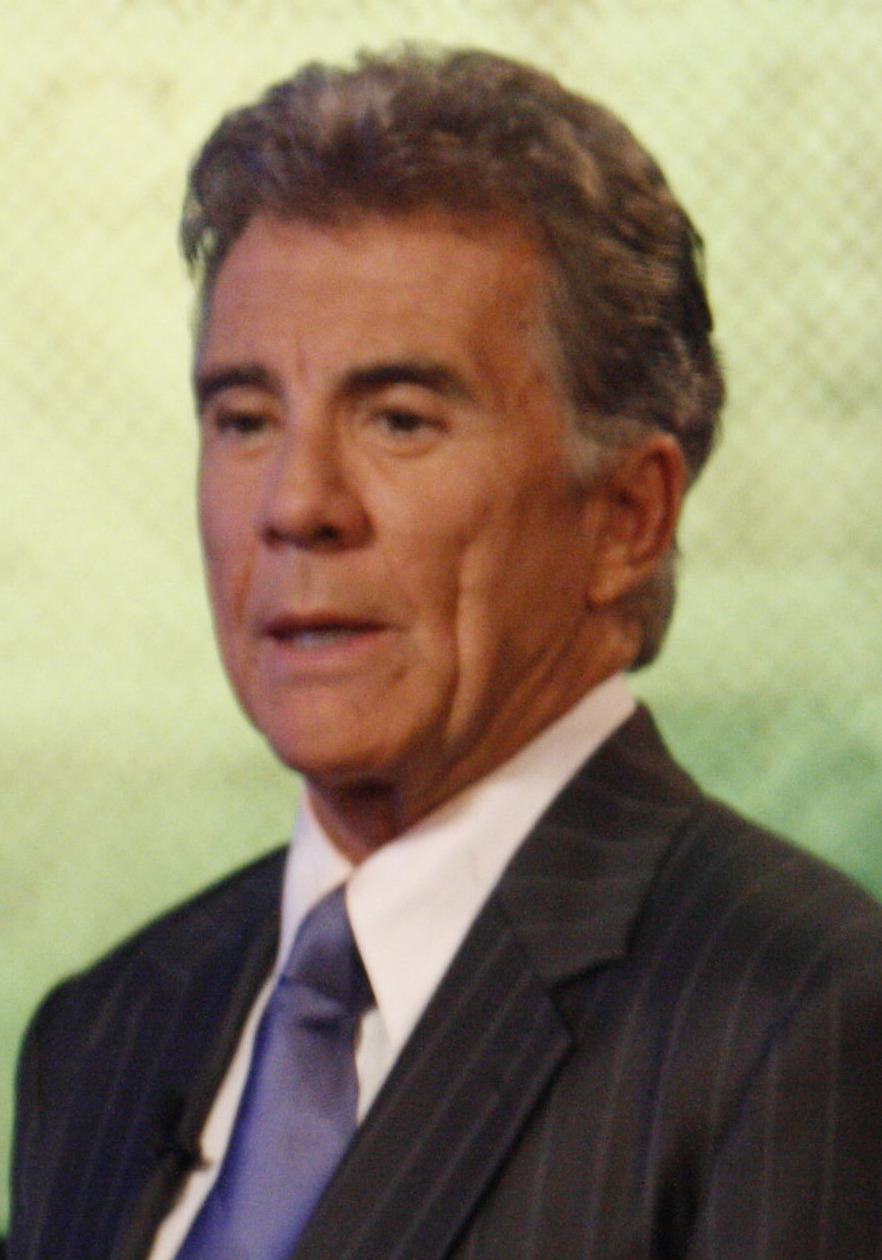
Television host John Walsh was interviewed on the subject of the unidentified child and gave contact information for potential tips.

On July 10, CNN News host Anderson Cooper interviewed the National Center for Missing and Exploited Children's co-founder and former host of America's Most Wanted, John Walsh about the case. Walsh stated, "absolutely someone knows" the identity of the Jane Doe and that in similar cases, often, the "live-in boyfriend" or the mother of the child had abused or neglected one of several children in a family, citing that the victim could have been "accidentally killed or starved to death." When explaining a probable reason why the girl had remained unidentified, Walsh stated, "people do not want to talk to cops," possibly due to the fear of authorities investigating their own lives—for instance, the family of Anjelica Castillo, who were undocumented immigrants and never reported the victim as missing due to fear of deportation. Walsh encouraged viewers to contact him instead, giving the number for the show he hosts, The Hunt With John Walsh, and the URL for his profile on the CNN website. He confirmed that those submitting tips could remain anonymous.

=== Tips ===
Many leads were followed that appeared to match the circumstances of the case. A woman who had been seen throwing a garbage bag over a bridge was later questioned by police, but the contents of the bag were found to be simply spoiled fruit. Other individuals stated they had seen toddlers resembling the Jane Doe, one at a store and another at a playground, with a woman clothed in a burqa. Investigators were unable to find any trace of the girl at the store through information gathered by security cameras, and the subject at the playground has yet to be located. A man stated he thought he had seen the toddler in November 2014 at a laundromat with a "heavyset" and "dirty blond" woman pushing the child in a stroller.

The local police department reported that they had received many tips suggesting possible identities for the child, those of missing girls throughout the country. Many readers online told police that the girl could be Aliayah Lunsford of West Virginia, who had disappeared on September 24, 2011. Lunsford would have been six at the time of the discovery and did bear a resemblance to the reconstruction of the Jane Doe, but she was later excluded from the case. The Massachusetts State Police later released statements on their Facebook pages regarding the exclusions of Lunsford, as well as Ayla Reynolds. Police were made aware of a possible link between the Jane Doe and Katherine Phillips, nicknamed "Baby Kate", who went missing in 2011. Phillips' body has never been recovered, despite the fact that her father has since been charged with her murder and convicted of kidnapping. Authorities expressed their doubts that the body was Katherine Phillips, but said they would investigate the lead. DNA between the pair was eventually compared. Phillips was later ruled out as "Baby Doe" and an announcement to the public was released on July 10.

Investigators set up a 24-hour hotline for those with information on the case to call. A text hotline was also created. Many submitted information about potential matches, later revealed to be missing children in over half of the United States, as well as in European and South and Central American countries. A total of 84 billboards, including digital signs donated by Clear Channel, were also placed across the state of Massachusetts, encouraging individuals to report tips to the anonymous hotlines created for the child.

== Identification ==
The child was identified as Bella Neveah Amoroso Bond on September 18, 2015. The identification was made after the sister of one of Rachelle Bond's neighbors reported to police a link between Bond and the Jane Doe. Apparently, the neighbor had noticed Bella was absent from the household and had confronted Rachelle Dee Bond and her boyfriend Michael P. McCarthy. They stated that the girl had been "taken away by the Department of Children and Families" (this was later disproved). Subsequently, the neighbor told his sister that he believed that "Baby Doe" was Bella Bond, and she contacted authorities. One witness told authorities she grew concerned when she stopped seeing the child at her mother's apartment and when the girl's toys were disposed of. On September 17, 2015, a search warrant was executed at the home of Rachelle Bond, 40, the child's mother, in Dorchester, Massachusetts.

Bella's biological father, Joe Amoroso, had allegedly never met his daughter but had spoken with her by telephone. Amoroso had stated he had learned of Bella's death when Rachelle told him during a visit, within a week before the identification was made. He states that he thought that Bond would not ever have hurt her daughter. Amoroso elaborated in another interview that he thought Rachelle had been "sedated" with an injection of heroin by her boyfriend quickly after Bella's death, as a "track mark" visible on her neck could not be the result of her own action. Unlike her son, Bella's paternal grandmother stated that she thought Rachelle Bond was heavily involved in Bella's death and openly questioned the truthfulness of her allegations toward Michael McCarthy.

Amoroso announced plans to bury Bella in Winthrop, Massachusetts, among family members, stating he had decided to allow the "funeral and wake services to be public." Bella Bond was buried on November 28, 2015, at the Winthrop Cemetery during a private funeral, after her parents later came to a consensus not to have the service open to the public. She was buried under a headstone reading "Bella N. Bond Amoroso" with the date of death listed as the day she was discovered. Images of the toddler from her mother's Facebook page were later released to the public.

== Suspects ==
Rachelle Bond, known as a habitual drug user, had two other children who had been removed from her custody. She had also been arrested multiple times in the past, for other crimes, including prostitution. Police commented that they had dealt with complaints that she was neglecting her daughter and had had four separate encounters with Bond. Bella's family was interviewed after the identification was announced. Her aunt stated that she had never suspected that "Baby Doe" was Bella, and the maternal grandmother of the victim was unaware that the child was ever born. The Department of Children and Families had responded to two neglect complaints regarding Bella; both cases were closed.

Police released the information that the child was a murder victim and charged Michael McCarthy, the mother's boyfriend, with Bond's death. They also charged her mother with being an accessory to the crime, believing her to have assisted McCarthy with "covering up" Bella's death. Larceny was added to Rachelle Bond's charges after she was found to have accepted nearly $1,400 of welfare income after she knew about the death of her daughter. Bond also continued to receive housing benefits. The pair were arraigned on September 21, 2015. Rachelle's bail was set for $1 million; McCarthy was not eligible for bail. McCarthy was scheduled to appear in court again on February 16, 2016, after Rachelle Bond's appearance on January 6. A judge later set Rachelle Bond's trial date to December 1, 2016. Selection of jury members for McCarthy's trial started on May 22.

=== Trials ===
Authorities have acknowledged that since the exact cause of Bella's death remains unknown, asserting to a jury that it was homicide could be "difficult to prove." Rachelle Bond alleged that McCarthy had punched the toddler in the stomach multiple times after claiming Bella was a "demon", and that he was the sole perpetrator of the murder. Prosecutors of McCarthy allege that Bella was murdered in one of many abusive occasions after she had been uncooperative about going to bed. Citing that McCarthy had decided to "calm the child down," they say Rachelle had not entered the room alongside her boyfriend. When she did enter, they say she witnessed him near the girl's body, which was "swollen and gray," indicating she was deceased. Rachelle Bond's attorney claims McCarthy threatened to murder her client if she contacted authorities. She also maintained that Rachelle was not involved with hiding the victim's body, which had initially been placed in garbage bags and concealed in a refrigerator. Bond later admitted to this accusation as part of a future plea deal. A cadaver dog brought to the house indicated that it smelled something at the door hinge area of the refrigerator. Bond contradicted the assumption that the body was placed on Deer Island; she stated that McCarthy had placed the body in a weighted duffel bag and disposed of it in the water, suggesting it drifted to the location where it was found.

McCarthy for his part claimed it was Rachelle who was responsible for Bella's death. McCarthy's lawyer objected to claims made by Rachelle Bond's defense and stated that his client had no knowledge of Bella's death, saying no sufficient evidence exists to indicate otherwise, and claimed that McCarthy had in fact moved out of Rachelle Bond's residence before Bella's death. McCarthy claimed he had left after witnessing Rachelle's negative treatment of Bella, which included emotional and physical abuse. His defense also cited that Rachelle's statements could not be confirmed and that she was more likely to have killed her daughter because of her drug history. The claim of Bella being beaten to death was also challenged, as the autopsy did not indicate any signs of injuries consistent with what Rachelle described. Other claims exist that accuse Rachelle Bond of fabricating the story as a way to avoid being charged with murder. It was announced that McCarthy had sent Rachelle a text message that said "don't tell them you have a daughter. We don't want [the Department of Children and Families] getting involved".

In February 2017, McCarthy's trial was set to take place later in the year. The prosecutor in the case suggested that Rachelle Bond be awarded with "time served" in exchange for a testimony against McCarthy. His decision was made after considering the allegations that Bond had been threatened to be killed if she came forward about Bella's death. Bond pleaded guilty on February 10, 2017, under the suggested plea bargain, and was credited with time served plus two years of probation.

During McCarthy's trial in early June 2017, a "lifelong friend" of McCarthy's took the stand and expressed that he had warned Rachelle Bond of the potential danger she was in after entering a relationship with Bella's alleged killer. He explained that this was due to McCarthy's "dark side", including the fact that he heavily researched topics such as demons and satanic rituals. He also had apparently thought he had the ability to expunge demons from a residence. McCarthy's defense provided text messages and journal entries made by Bond that were written after Bella died. The entries still referred to him affectionately, which his attorneys assert suggest his innocence. Bond continued to claim her actions after the murder were "out of fear"; she was also allegedly "tranquilized" with heroin injected by McCarthy after the murder. His defense also claimed that Bond was the individual in the relationship with the "dark" interests.

Although McCarthy had been charged with first-degree murder, the judge allowed the jury to consider lesser charges of second-degree murder and involuntary manslaughter. On June 26, 2017, the jury returned a guilty verdict of second-degree murder, and two days later, he was sentenced to life imprisonment; he will be eligible for parole in 2037.

== See also ==
- Murder of Anjelica Castillo, where the victim was nicknamed "Baby Hope"
- Death of Caylee Anthony, the case of a toddler who received significant media attention
- Murder of Erica Green, where the victim was nicknamed "Precious Doe"
- Murder of Riley Ann Sawyers, where the victim was nicknamed "Baby Grace"
- Alisha Heinrich, where the victim was nicknamed "Delta Dawn"
- List of homicides in Massachusetts
- List of murdered American children
- List of solved missing person cases (2010s)
