= Murder of Ruth Marie Terry =

Formerly unidentified murder victim

Ruth Marie Terry
- Born: Ruth Marie Terry; September 8, 1936; Whitwell, Tennessee, U.S.
- Status: Identified after 48 years, 3 months and 5 days
- Died: c. July 1974 (aged 37)
- Cause of death: Homicide by blunt force trauma
- Body discovered: July 26, 1974; Provincetown, Massachusetts, U.S.
- Resting place: Saint Peters Cemetery, Provincetown, Massachusetts, U.S.
- Other name: "Provincetown Jane Doe"
- Known for: Former unidentified decedent
- Height: 5 ft 6.5 in (1.69 m) – 5 ft 8 in (1.73 m) (approximate)
- Spouse: Guy Rockwell Muldavin

Ruth Marie Terry (September 8, 1936 – c. July 1974), also known as Lady of the Dunes, was a formerly unidentified murder victim found on July 26, 1974, in the Race Point Dunes near to Provincetown, Massachusetts, United States. Her body was exhumed in 1980, 2000, and 2013 in efforts to identify her. In 2022, the FBI field office in Boston announced that Terry had been officially identified; her husband Guy Muldavin, who died in 2002, was officially named as her killer in 2023.

== Background ==
Ruth Terry was born on September 8, 1936, in Whitwell, Tennessee, to Johnny and Eva Terry, the latter of whom died at the age of 23. In 1957, following a short-lived marriage, Terry left Whitwell to work at the Fisher Body automotive plant in Livonia, Michigan. In 1958, she gave birth to her son, Richard, but was unable to care for him due to financial difficulties. She allowed the superintendent of her workplace, Richard Hanchett Sr., to adopt her son in return for him paying off her expenses. After the adoption process was finalized, Terry left Livonia and moved to California. Terry reached out to her son in 1972, but he was not ready to meet her due to a drug overdose which left him in a coma for 18 days.

On February 16, 1974, she married Guy Rockwell Muldavin, an antiques dealer in Reno, Nevada. Four months before her death, the couple visited her family in Whitwell. Ruth's grand-niece, Brittanie Novonglosky, later recalled that that Terry "wasn't herself" whenever she was with Muldavin, who exhibited possessive behavior. The couple then went to Chattanooga to visit Terry's half-brother, Kenneth, and his wife Carole; they later recalled Terry and Muldavin saying they were going to travel the U.S. to look for antiques. Kenneth also noted that they spoke about visiting Massachusetts as they were leaving.

In the late summer of 1974, Muldavin returned to Tennessee to tell Terry's family that she had gone missing from the couple's California home. According to her sister-in-law, Jan Terry, he stayed for a short time and simply told them that he didn't know where Terry was. Terry's brother, James, traveled to California and hired a private investigator to find her. The investigator told Terry's family that all of her belongings had been sold and that she had left the state of her own will after becoming involved with a religious cult. In the two decades prior to her identification, Terry was listed as deceased in family obituaries. Carole theorized that she was in a witness protection program and could not contact her family.

== Discovery ==
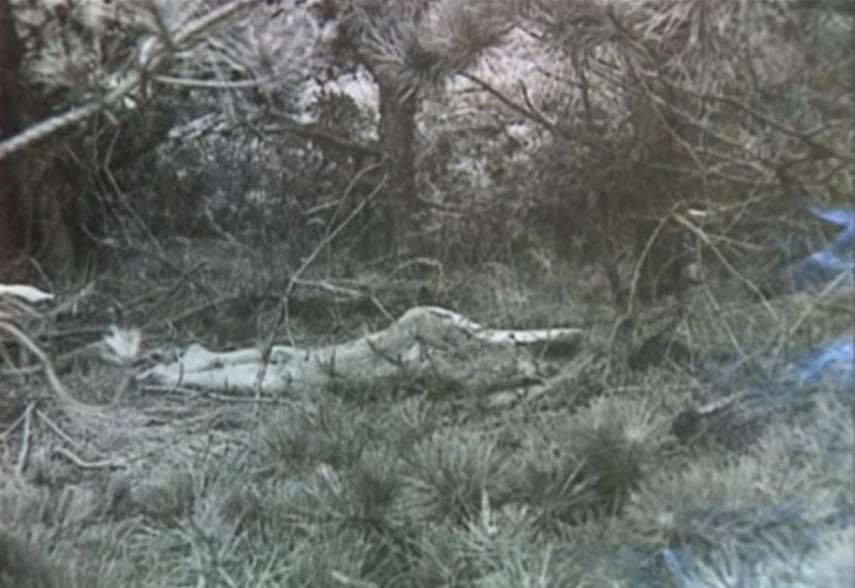
Terry's body upon her discovery

On July 26, 1974, a 12-year-old girl followed a barking dog to the decomposing body of an unidentified woman in the Race Point Dunes of Provincetown, Massachusetts. The remains were just yards away from a road and had a significant amount of insect activity. Two sets of footprints led to the body, and tire tracks were found 50 yards (46 m) from the scene. The woman may have died two weeks beforehand.

The victim was lying face-down on half of a beach blanket. There was no sign of a struggle; police theorized she either knew her killer or had been asleep when she died. A blue bandana and pair of Wrangler jeans were under her head. She had long auburn or red hair pulled back into a ponytail by a gold-flecked elastic band. Her toenails were painted pink.

Police determined the woman was approximately 5 feet 6 inches (168 cm) tall (initially believed to have been 5 feet 8 inches (173 cm)), weighed 145 pounds (66 kg), and had an athletic build. She also had expensive dental work – including crowns – worth between $5,000 and $10,000, and several of her teeth had been removed. Both hands and one forearm were missing. Most sources say she was between 25 and 40 years old. However, she could have been as young as 20 or as old as 49.

The woman was nearly decapitated, possibly from strangulation; one side of her head had been crushed possibly with a military-type intrenching tool. This head injury was the cause of death. There were also signs of sexual assault, likely postmortem. Some investigators believe that the missing teeth, hands and forearm indicate the killer wanted to hide either the victim's identity or their own. The woman was buried in October 1974 after the case went cold. In 2014, one of the case investigators raised funds for a new casket, because the original thin metal casket had rusted and deteriorated.

== Investigation ==
2010 reconstruction

Other depictions of Terry, created between 1979 and 2006

Police pored over thousands of missing-person cases and a list of approved vehicles driven through the area; no matches were found. At the scene, the sand and beach blanket were not disturbed, suggesting that the body was possibly moved to the specific spot where it was found. No other evidence was found (besides the jeans, bandana, blanket, and ponytail holder) despite extensive searches of the surrounding dunes.

The first facial reconstruction of the woman was created with clay in 1979. Her remains were exhumed in 1980 for examination; no new clues were uncovered (although the skull was not buried at the time). The body was exhumed again in March 2000 for DNA testing. In May 2010, a CT of her skull was carried out that generated images that were then used by the National Center for Missing and Exploited Children for another reconstruction.

=== Leads ===
In 1987, a Canadian woman told a friend that she saw her father strangle a woman in Massachusetts around 1972. Police attempted to locate the woman but were unsuccessful. Another woman told police the reconstruction of the victim looked like her sister, who had disappeared in Boston in 1974.

Investigators also followed a lead involving missing criminal Rory Gene Kesinger, who would have been 25 years old at the time of the murder (she had broken out of jail in 1973). Authorities saw a resemblance between Kesinger and the victim. However, DNA from Kesinger's mother did not match the victim. Two other missing women, Francis Ewalt and Vicke Lamberton, were also ruled out.

=== Jaws film extra possibility ===
In August 2015, speculation arose that Lady of the Dunes may have been an extra in the 1975 film Jaws, which had been shot on Martha's Vineyard (specifically the village of Menemsha), about 100 miles (160 km) south of Provincetown, between May and October 1974. Joe Hill, the son of horror author Stephen King, brought this to police attention after reading The Skeleton Crew: How Amateur Sleuths are Solving America's Coldest Cases just weeks before. While watching the film's Fourth of July beach scene, Hill spotted a woman in the crowd wearing a blue bandana and jeans, similar to those found with the body. Although a lead investigator has noted interest in this lead, others have described it as "far-fetched" and "wild speculation".

== Identification ==
In 2022, the skeletal remains were sent to Othram; from these, a DNA profile was generated that was used to identify distant relatives, and eventually identify the victim. On October 31, 2022, the FBI field office in Boston announced that the victim had been identified as Terry.

== Guy Muldavin ==
On November 2, 2022, the MSP announced that they were seeking information on Terry's deceased husband, Guy Rockwell Muldavin (October 26, 1923 – March 14, 2002). In 1942, Muldavin was living in New York City and attended the American Academy of Dramatic Arts. He was disqualified from active service in the military during World War II due to a mastoid infection. On May 11, 1946, while working as a professor, he married Joellen Mae Loop in Bellevue, Pennsylvania. The couple lived in New York, California, and then Seattle, Washington, where Muldavin worked as a disc jockey. The couple divorced on July 16, 1956.

Two years later, on September 30, 1958, Muldavin married Manzanita Aileen 'Manzy' Ryan in Coeur d'Alene, Idaho. Manzanita had a daughter from a previous marriage, Dolores Ann Mearns, then aged 18. Both women disappeared in Seattle on April 1, 1960, with Muldavin becoming the prime suspect. He fled Seattle but was arrested by the FBI and charged with unlawful flight to avoid giving testimony into their deaths.

Shortly thereafter, on July 29, 1960, Muldavin married Evelyn Marie Emerson in King County, Washington; they married a second time on August 10, 1963, in Los Angeles. Muldavin subsequently faced larceny charges for swindling his third wife's family out of $10,000 around the time his second wife went missing. In 1961 he was convicted of those charges and was sentenced to fifteen years in prison. A judge suspended the sentence in March 1962 provided that Muldavin repay the money.

True-crime writer Ann Rule devoted a section of her 2007 book Smoke, Mirrors and Murder to Muldavin in connection with the Ryan-Mearns disappearances, with an extensive discussion of police efforts to connect Muldavin with the crime. Investigators found dismembered human body parts in Muldavin's septic tank but were unable to prove they were from either of the missing women. According to Rule, Muldavin was never charged in connection, as the King County prosecutor was reluctant to do so without a body. Rule mentions that Muldavin married a woman named 'Teri' in February 1974 in Reno, Nevada.

Muldavin is also the prime suspect in the murder of Henry Lawrence "Red" Baird, a 28-year-old bread truck driver, and the disappearance of Barbara Joe Kelley, a 17-year-old waitress, in June 1950. Barbara was last seen in Humboldt County, California, on June 17, 1950, when she embarked on a date with Baird, her boyfriend. Baird's body was discovered face down on the beach near Table Bluff the following morning. He was shot in the back of the head. Except for his shoes and socks, he was naked. Barbara's personal clothing was found carefully folded and tucked underneath the rest of his, with the exception of her shoes and stockings. No trace of Barbara herself could be found. She has not been seen or heard from since, and it is thought that whoever shot Baird had kidnapped her.

Muldavin moved to Chualar, California, a small community near Salinas, around 1976. According to a feature article written about him in 1985, he had retired from his job as an executive vice president of a silver store on Rodeo Drive in Beverly Hills. In the profile he was working at the radio station KAZU in Pacific Grove as a volunteer host of a 3-hour weekly call-in show on "aging, growing and making transitions". He also worked at a tobacco shop in Carmel. According to his obituary, Muldavin was born in Santa Fe, New Mexico, on October 26, 1923, and died of a "lengthy illness" in Salinas, on March 14, 2002; survived by his wife, Phyllis Muldavin, and his sister, Joan Towers. On August 28, 2023, Guy Muldavin was officially named as Terry's killer.

== Earlier suspects ==
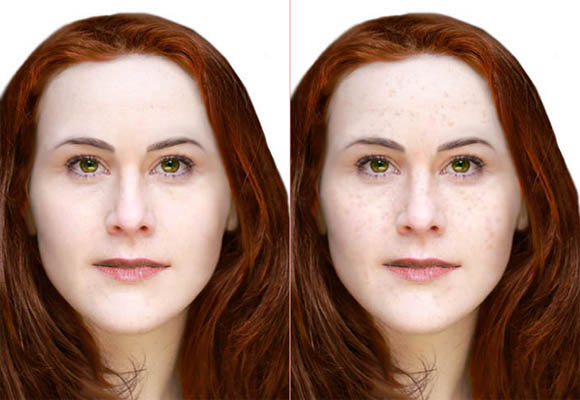
Additional reconstruction, depicting Terry with and without freckles

In 1981, investigators learned a woman who resembled the victim was seen with mobster Whitey Bulger around the time the woman presumably died. Bulger was known for removing his victims' teeth. A link to Bulger has not been proven, and he was murdered in prison in 2018.

Tony Costa, a serial killer in Truro, Massachusetts, was initially a suspect, but later eliminated. Costa died on May 12, 1974. The victim was found in July 1974. Costa was incarcerated as of 1970 and killed himself in prison.

=== Hadden Clark confession ===
Murderer Hadden Clark confessed to the murder, stating "I could have told the police what her name was, but after they beat the shit out of me, I wasn't going to tell them shit. [...] This murder is still unsolved and what the police are looking for is in my grandfather's garden." Authorities say Clark has paranoid schizophrenia, a condition which may lead someone to confess falsely to crimes.

In 2000, Clark led police to a spot where he claimed he had buried two victims 20 years before. He also stated that he had murdered several others in various states between the 1970s and the 1990s. In 2004, Clark sent a letter to a friend stating that he had killed a woman on Cape Cod, Massachusetts. He also sent two drawings: one of a handless, naked woman sprawled on her stomach, and another of a map pointing to where the body was found.

== See also ==
- List of solved missing person cases: 1950–1999
- Murder of Ruth Waymire
- Death of Doris Girtz

== Cited works and further reading ==
- Halber, Deborah (2015). The Skeleton Crew: How Amateur Sleuths Are Solving America's Coldest Cases. New York: Simon & Schuster. ISBN 978-1-451-65758-6.
- Lee, Sandra (December 12, 2012). The Shanty : Provincetown's Lady in the Dunes. Frederick County, Maryland: America Star Books. ISBN 978-1630000608.
