= Howard Neal =

Convicted American murderer and suspected serial killer

- Born: Howard Monteville Neal; September 14, 1953 (age 73); Ellisville, Mississippi, U.S.
- Conviction: Capital murder
- Penalty: Death; commuted to life imprisonment

Details
- Victims: 3–5
- Span of crimes: 1980–1981
- Country: United States
- States: Mississippi; California (confessed)
- Date apprehended: March 6, 1981
- Imprisoned at: Marshall County Correctional Facility, Holly Springs, Mississippi

Howard Monteville Neal (born September 14, 1953) is an American murderer and self-confessed serial killer. Convicted and sentenced to death for killing his half-brother and two nieces in Arm, Mississippi in 1981, his sentence was later commuted to life imprisonment after it was concluded that Neal was intellectually disabled.

In 2017, he confessed to the 1980 double murder of a John and Jane Doe in Ludlow, California, who were later identified as Pamela Duffy and William "Digger" Lane. He has yet to be charged with their killings, but is considered the prime suspect.

== Triple murder ==
Shortly before January 24, 1981, Neal quit his job at an oil field in Wheeler, Texas and traveled to Mississippi together with his wife and young daughter. After leaving the pair at Della's Motel in Brookhaven, Neal went to visit his half-brother, 41-year-old Bobby Clifford Neal, who lived on a small ranch in Arm together with his 13-year-old daughter Amanda. At the time, a cousin of Amanda's, 12-year-old Melanie Sue Polk, was also visiting them.

After talking for some time, all four of them decided to go on a ride in Bobby's car. Along the way, however, one of the girls complained that Howard kept playing with her leg, causing Bobby to get angry at his half-brother. After reaching a wooded area, the two men got out for a walk. When he determined that they were far away from the car, Howard accosted Bobby and tied his hands behind his back, before shooting him once in the chest with a concealed handgun. He then returned to the car and threatened the girls at gunpoint into another area of the forest, where he raped Amanda and also attempted to rape Polk. After he was done with them, Neal made them line up to the car and shot both girls, before proceeding to additionally beat and strangle Amanda.

On February 6, Clifford Brown and his wife were travelling along a logging route near the Pearl River when he saw Amanda Neal's body. The pair quickly went back to town and phoned the police, who rushed to the scene to take photographs of the corpse and sent it a coroner. Said coroner, Dr. Sergio Gonzalez, later concluded that her death was the result of a gunshot wound. Later that same day, Polk's body was discovered in a different location, indicating that one of the two had likely survived long enough to crawl away but had succumbed to their injuries. Initially, Bobby was considered the prime suspect in the case, until his own body was found on March 1.

Shortly after Bobby's body was discovered, Neal was arrested on a shoplifting charge in Stockton, California and later illegal weapons possession, as a .22-caliber pistol, a .44 Magnum and two sets of handcuffs were found in his vehicle. Further inquiries into his criminal record, relationship to the victims and the testimony of his wife resulted in him being charged solely with Amanda's murder.

=== Trial, sentence and imprisonment ===
Neal's trial was scheduled for February 1982, but a few days before it was set to begin, Justice R. I. Pritchard ordered that the accused should undergo a psychiatric evaluation to determine whether he was sane or not. On February 2, 1982, the trial began in Purvis.

During the proceedings, one of the prosecution's witnesses, Sgt. Dean Wilson, produced an alleged confession detailing how Neal had carried out his crimes. In response, Neal's defense attorneys filed a motion to have this confession suppressed, arguing that their client should be acquitted. Justice Pritchard denied these motions and allowed the confession to be admitted as evidence. After a three-day long trial, Neal was found guilty by jury verdict and subsequently sentenced to death. The judge set his execution date for March 8, 1982, which was automatically appealed. That same August, Neal was charged with the murder of his half-brother, with an abundance of evidence and witness testimonies placing him on the crime scene. Two days later, Neal was convicted, but as the jury were not unanimous in their decisions for his punishment, he was given an automatic life sentence instead. Years later, the Sheriff's Department conducted IQ test on Neal which showed that his intelligence was low enough to be considered borderline mentally challenged, as a result of which his death sentence was commuted to life imprisonment without parole.

In August 2023, the Mississippi Supreme Court ruled unanimously that Neal should be resentenced to life imprisonment with parole due to his intellectual disability and poor health.

== Confessions and investigation ==
On November 17, 1980, an archeologist studying a remote area near Ludlow, California accidentally found a shallow grave containing the naked bodies of a young man and woman. Both showed signs of being shot and beaten, but neither had any identification on them. Despite extensive efforts to identify the pair over the years, all of them proved unsuccessful.

At the time, Neal was considered a person of interest in the case, as he was residing in Ludlow in the timeframe when the bodies were discovered. However, his attorney at the time prevented the California investigators from interviewing him, and his involvement remained a mere speculation for decades. In November 2017, investigators finally managed to interview Neal, who readily confessed to the double murder. According to his statements, he had picked up the pair while they were hitchhiking and then took them to his home, where he attempted to sexually assault the woman, but was prevented from doing so by her male companion. In response, he killed the man, raped the woman and then shot her as well, before burying their bodies in the desert. When pressed for their identities, Neal stated that he never learned who they were, claiming that he thought the woman, who was possibly from Arkansas, had ditched her child to hitchhike across the country in the company of her friend, whom he described as a hippie.

The case was eventually brought to the attention of Othram by the San Bernardino County Sheriff's Department, as well as a private investigator who had been hired by a woman from Virginia, Christina Marie Salley, to locate her biological mother. DNA was extracted from the bodies, and in December 2020, thanks to the DNA sample provided by Salley, authorities positively identified the female victim as 20-year-old Pamela Duffy. The male, 19-year-old William "Digger" Lane, a former prison inmate, was identified via DNA from his mother, who was living in Florida.

== See also ==
- Othram
