= Murder of Ruth Waymire =

1984 murder in Spokane, Washington

Ruth Waymire
- High school photograph of Waymire taken during her sophomore year
- Born: Ruth Belle Waymire; April 16, 1960
- Died: c. June 1984 (aged 24)
- Body discovered: Torso: T.J. Meenach Bridge, Spokane River, June 20, 1984 Skull: corner of Seventh and Sherman street, Spokane, Washington, April 19, 1998
- Resting place: Fairmount Cemetery, Spokane, Washington
- Other names: Spokane Jane Doe, "Millie"
- Known for: Former unidentified decedent

Ruth Belle Waymire (April 16, 1960 – c. June 1984), formerly known as Millie Doe, was a formerly unidentified female murder victim whose dismembered body was found in Spokane, Washington, in 1984. Her body was recovered from the Spokane River on June 20, 1984, and was missing the hands, feet, and head. Fourteen years later, in 1998, a skull was found elsewhere in Spokane that was later determined as belonging to Waymire. While transporting the skull for forensic analysis, the detective responsible for the case was accompanied by his young daughter who suggested naming the decedent Millie for the sake of giving her a name. She was identified on March 29, 2023, by Othram, a forensic genetic genealogy business.

== Background ==
Ruth Belle Waymire grew up in Spokane. Both Ruth and her younger sister Deborah were born while their parents were still married. Deborah has described her relationship with Ruth growing up as "real close", with Ruth having been a protector figure in Deborah's life. Waymire's father was a furnace operator and her mother was a stay-at-home mom until they divorced when Ruth was in high school. Ruth and Deborah lived with their mother and a local family while their father paid child support. Upon remarrying, Waymire's father ceased financially supporting his first family, around which time Waymire's mother was diagnosed with cancer, causing multiple stays in the hospital.

Waymire's mother died in 1981, soon after which both Waymire sisters dropped out of school. Ruth was described as leading a "vagabond" lifestyle. Ruth married her first husband soon afterwards, and their marriage ended several months later. Shortly afterwards, Ruth began dating Travis Vaughn, born 1945. Despite concerns from Deborah about the speed of their relationship progression, Ruth and Vaughn were married several months later in Wenatchee, Washington, and moved away from Spokane, causing the Waymire sisters to become estranged and lose contact with each other.

== Discovery and investigation of the body ==
On 20 June 1984, the nude and dismembered body of a woman was found floating in the Spokane River near Spokane Falls Community College and the T. J. Meenach Bridge by two young fishermen. The victim, who would come to be known as "Millie", was missing her head, hands, and feet, none of which would be recovered from the original scene. Initial estimates by Spokane County Medical Examiner Sally Aiken placed Waymire's post-mortem interval at 48 hours, however, upon noting that the temperature of the river when she was found had been 48 °F (9 °C), Aiken later changed the original estimate to anywhere from several days to several weeks, due to the cold potentially inhibiting decomposition. Ruth's body showed clear signs of sexual assault with a blunt object to both the vaginal and rectal cavities, indicated by a bruise on the vaginal area and a tear in the rectum. A piece of tape was also found wrapped around one of her arms.

Due to the intensity of the efforts taken to prevent identification (the dismemberment removing the possibility of dental identification, fingerprint analysis, or facial identification), investigators theorized that Waymire's killer was likely someone she knew, who might be under suspicion for her murder if she was identified. Additionally, it is theorized that Waymire's killer had killed before, since dismemberment is not typically considered part of a first murder. However, no other murders committed around Spokane around the time of Waymire's murder showed similar enough methods to be considered correlated. Prior to her identification, it was incorrectly believed that Waymire was not local to Spokane, perhaps not even from Washington, as it was considered unlikely that someone would not have eventually recognized her if she was. Despite happening in the same state as the Green River Murders and containing sexual assault, Waymire's case was never suspected to be connected to Gary Ridgway.

A medical examiner from King County came in to Spokane to perform Millie's autopsy. Notable physical characteristics on Millie's body included a scar on each knee, a scar on her left bicep, and two moles on the front of her neck. Initial age estimates placed Millie as between 30 and 40 years old, however these were eventually changed to between 25 and 35 years old. It was estimated that Waymire likely stood 5'7'', weighed 130 pounds (59 kg), and had a medium build. Body hairs found with the body indicate that Millie was likely blonde, with possible Scandinavian ancestry. Examination of the dismemberment wounds indicated that they had likely been inflicted with a hatchet, axe, or knife. The autopsy also indicated that Millie had given birth before at least once in her life. The body of Debbi Finnern, a local woman who had also been murdered, was found in close proximity to Millie's body only a few days apart, and is often mentioned in conjunction with Millie's case; however, they have never been considered related.

A month after the recovery of Waymire's body, a dog in nearby Rimrock brought home a decomposing, severed human hand, which was initially suspected to be Millie's, and was sent in to the FBI in Washington, D.C. for fingerprinting. However, the hand being Waymire's was later disproven through genetic testing. The hand was also lost during the process of testing, eliminating the possibility of reexamining it.

== Discovery and investigation of the skull ==
On 19 April 1998, at approximately 7 in the evening, a local resident of Spokane was walking her dog near a vacant lot at the corner of Seventh and Sherman street. The resident saw what appeared to be a human skull among debris at the bottom of an embankment at the northwest corner of the lot. Police were called and the lot was sealed, and investigation of the lot began April 20. Police excavating the lot found other bones, however these were later proven to not originate from the same remains. The skull had also not immediately been determined to be male or female, nor had an age or a cause of death been determined. However, the circumstances of the recovery prompted police to investigate the case as a homicide. Initially it was thought to be another victim of serial killer Spokane Serial Killer, who was active at the time. If the skull was determined to be female the case would potentially be turned over to the serial killer task force. The lot where the skull was discovered had formerly been home to the Sharon Temple Christian Methodist Episcopal Church, which had been demolished in 1989 after several years of vacancy. Initially, investigators were unsure if the church had housed a cemetery, and if the skull could potentially belong to a body interred there. After the church was demolished, the lot fell into disrepair, and the spot quickly became a favorite location of play for children in the surrounding neighborhood. The north side of the lot in particular was heavily wooded, and had previously contained a tree house and a swing. The lot would be cleaned by volunteer crews very occasionally, approximately once every few years. The area of the lot where the skull had been recovered had last been cleared in the fall of 1997.

In March 2000, the initial police reconstruction of the skull was released to law enforcement agencies throughout the Northwestern United States, and it was confirmed that the skull belonged to the torso found in 1984. Though all of the detectives who had worked on the torso case in 1984 had since retired, the evidence from the case was still available on file. Two vertebrae were still attached to Millie's skull when it was discovered, and medical examiner George Lindholm discovered the angle of the dismemberment wounds on those vertebrae matched the dismemberment wounds on the neck of the unidentified torso found in 1984. Following this discovery, the torso and skull were scheduled for DNA testing to confirm the match, and the torso was exhumed from Fairmount Cemetery in Spokane. At this time, the detective in charge of the skull's case was detective Don Geise. Geise was to transport the skull from where it was being held to a forensic anthropologist in western Washington, and was accompanied on this task by his fifth-grade daughter. While stopped at a motel for the night on this trip, Geise's daughter reportedly said "Since we have another person in the room, we should name her. Let's call her Millie". Following this, "Millie" became the name used amongst investigators to refer to the case.

== Ongoing investigation ==
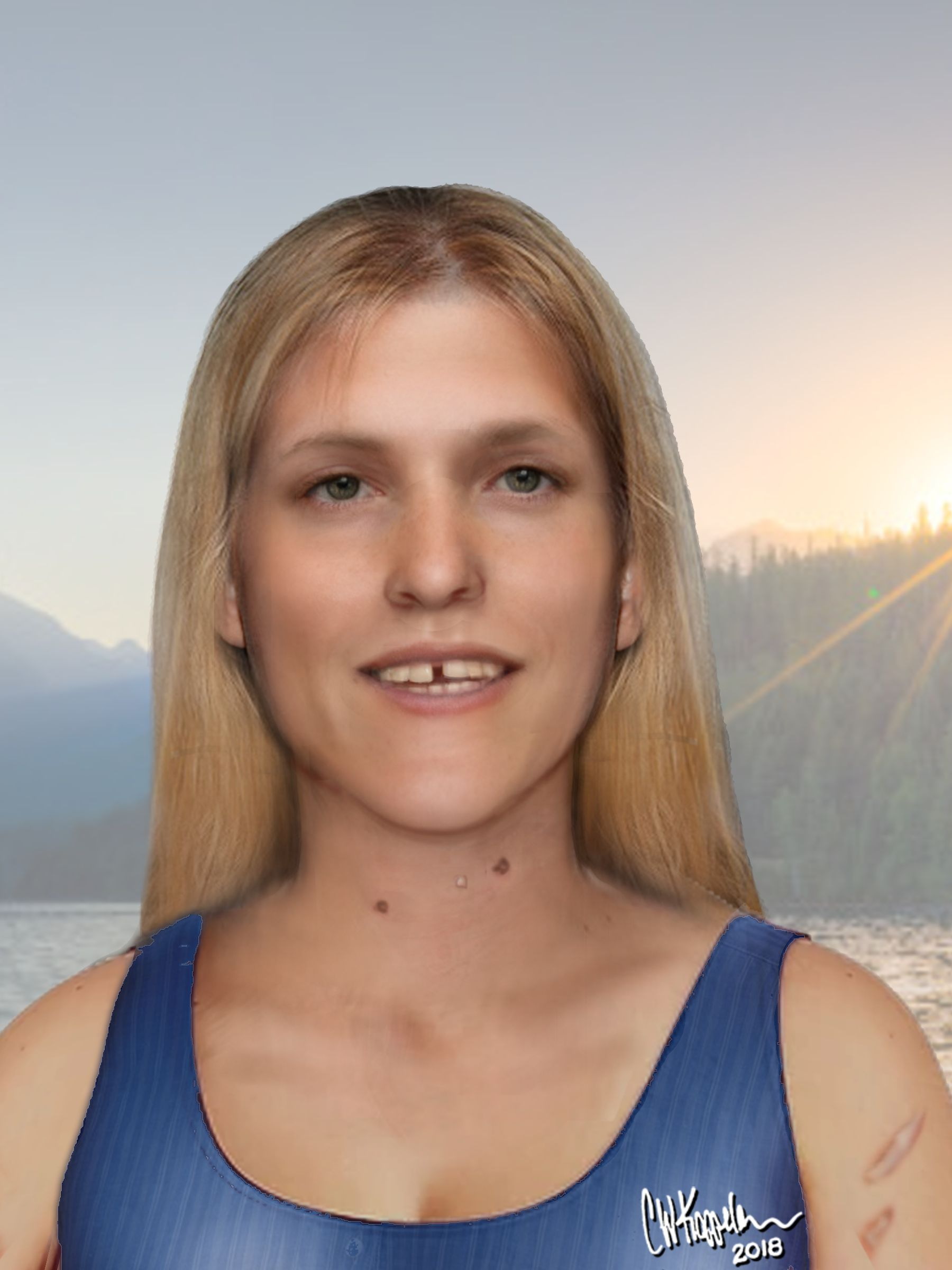
Reconstruction of Waymire by Carl Koppelman.

Following the exhumation and testing of Millie's DNA, Millie's genome was submitted to state, national, and international databases of DNA of unidentified decedents, including the Washington State Patrol's Missing and Unidentified Persons Database and the National Crime Information Center. The FBI also expressed intention to upload Millie's DNA to a Canadian national database. A forensic dentist also examined Millie's skull and determined that she had dental work done shortly before her death.

In 2004, a woman from New South Wales told investigators that she believed that Millie could be her missing daughter, and her DNA was tested and compared to the victim's, conclusively ruling this possibility out.

In 2006, the tape found on Millie's arm in 1984 was sent to the Washington State Patrol Crime Lab to be tested for DNA, with the hope that DNA could be found on it that would help to identify the killer.

In 2007, another facial reconstruction was drawn by forensic artist Carrie Stuart Parks, and a more comprehensive article about the case was featured in a regional newspaper The Spokesman Review. As of 2007, Millie was reported to be the only unidentified female in Spokane County.

In 2015, investigators received a tip that Millie could be a missing woman who disappeared from Blythe, California in 1980, having last been seen in neighboring Ehrenberg, Arizona with members of a biker gang. DNA was submitted by a sister of the missing woman, as well as the missing woman's son, who was an infant when she disappeared.

== Identification ==
In September 2021, samples from Millie's torso were sent to Othram for DNA sequencing, where a DNA profile was built. Genealogists at the company used the profile to provide a list of potential family members to Spokane Police Department, who eventually narrowed her identity down to Ruth Belle Waymire, born on April 16, 1960. Waymire's identity was confirmed 17 February 2023 and released to the public on 29 March 2023. She was a graduate of Rogers High School and spent time in Wenatchee as well as Spokane. Waymire's parents divorced when she was a child and she, her sister, and their mother moved in with a local family in Spokane. However, her mother died shortly thereafter. Waymire and her sister eventually became estranged and never re-established contact again. She was never reported missing and was described as having led a transient lifestyle.

Waymire was married to her second husband, Trampas D.L. Vaughn (1945–2017) at the time of her murder. Vaughn was born in Iowa and spent time in prison there before marrying Waymire in Wenatchee. Vaughn died in Sutter County, California in 2017. The Spokane Police Department consider him a suspect in his wife's murder due to the fact that he never reported her missing. No other suspects have been considered, including Waymire's first husband who is cooperating with the investigation. Spokane Police and investigators with the Medical Examiner's Office are also seeking information on Waymire's child or children due to her autopsy revealing she had a child roughly a year or two before her murder.

== See also ==
- Lists of solved missing person cases
- List of unsolved murders (1980–1999)
- Murder of Evelyn Colon
- Murder of Ruth Marie Terry
- Death of Doris Girtz
