= Disappearance of Ayla Reynolds =

2011 missing child case in Maine, United States

Ayla Reynolds
- Born: April 4, 2010; Waterville, Maine, U.S.
- Disappeared: December 16, 2011 (aged 1); Waterville, Maine, U.S.
- Status: Missing for 14 years, 7 months and 13 days; Declared dead in absentia May 30, 2017
- Parent(s): Trista Reynolds and Justin DiPietro

Ayla Reynolds is an American child from Waterville, Maine, who disappeared, aged 19 months, on December 16, 2011. She was last seen at 8:00 p.m. that night in her bed by a family member, but was not there when her father checked the next morning. The case was the largest criminal investigation in Maine's history and the third largest search for a missing child in the state's history, perhaps exceeded by the intensive search for the Mott children in Baxter State Park in August 1965.

== Background ==
Ayla Reynolds was the daughter of Trista Reynolds and Justin DiPietro. She was born on April 4, 2010, in Waterville, Maine.

== Disappearance ==
Ayla had been placed temporarily in the home of her father, Justin DiPietro, by a Maine Department of Human Services (DHS) employee, Karen Small. Relatives maintain that Small decided to forego conducting a home visit prior to Ayla's placement. Her mother Trista Reynolds was in the area, and claims she was on her way to rehab for her heroin addiction. Ayla was reported missing from her bed on December 17, 2011. According to DiPietro’s statement to the police, the last time he saw Ayla, she was wearing green polka dot pajamas with "Daddy's Princess" written across them, along with a soft cast on her left arm. There were two people, besides DiPietro, in the house at the time of Ayla's disappearance: his girlfriend Courtney Roberts, and his sister Elisha DiPietro.

State police held a press conference in May 2012 to discuss recent developments in the case, including the discovery of blood in her father's house and the number of people who were present at the time of her disappearance. The blood was confirmed to be more than a cupful of Ayla's blood, adjacent to DiPietro's bed. The only comment state investigators made at the time of its discovery was that it was 'more blood than a small cut would produce.'

== Search ==
Following Ayla's disappearance, a group of Waterville businesses posted a reward of $30,000 for information leading to her safe return. The reward generated approximately 1,200 leads, many of them from psychics, none of which led to the discovery of any information regarding Ayla. DiPietro, his brother Lance, and a mutual friend collaborated with the Laura Recovery Center to produce T-shirts, buttons, flyers, and other goods to spread awareness of Ayla's disappearance.

DiPietro did not speak about his daughter's disappearance for almost three weeks after the story broke. As a result, Ayla's mother accused him of having something to hide. Nearly a full year later, in October 2012, police trawled Messalonskee Stream a second time to look for Ayla's remains, when construction workers repairing a bridge artificially lowered the water level in the stream. Nothing was found.

DiPietro has not been charged in relation to the case; however, state investigators and Trista Reynolds have both expressed that they believe DiPietro has not been forthcoming about his knowledge of Ayla's disappearance.

On June 25, 2015, an unidentified toddler, known as "Baby Doe" or Deer Island Jane Doe, was found dead on the shore of Deer Island, Massachusetts. The subject was believed to have been around three to five years old at the time of death, which was somewhat consistent with Reynolds. Many suspected that the unidentified body was Ayla, but she was soon excluded as a possible identity. The Jane Doe was identified in September 2015 as Bella Bond.

== Aftermath ==
At the one-year anniversary of Ayla's disappearance, the Maine State Police, Maine Warden Service, and Waterville Police stated that they would not let up on search efforts until Ayla was found. Two searches conducted earlier that month in southern New Hampshire and in Mayfield turned up nothing.

A candlelight vigil was held in Waterville to mark one month of Ayla's being missing and was attended by DiPietro. He was also the first to leave the vigil and refused to speak to the media. Trista organized a 4-mile (6.4 km) walk in Waterville called the "Eyes Open" walk, as well as a similar walk in Portland, in May and July 2012, in order to keep media attention focused on the case.

On May 17, 2017, Ayla was declared dead by the State of Maine. On December 17, 2018, Trista Reynolds filed a wrongful death lawsuit against Justin DiPietro, alleging that he caused Ayla's death through "intentional wrongful actions" and subjected the child to "pre-death pain, fright, terror and physical injuries." At the time of filing, DiPietro's whereabouts were unknown.

On February 22, 2022, Trista Reynolds sought to amend and expand the wrongful death lawsuit against Justin DiPietro because of newly discovered evidence.

== In popular culture ==
In 2012, a local Maine songwriter, Pete Haase, wrote a song about Ayla's disappearance and the effect it had on the community.

In 2013, the Ugandan singer Pallaso released his single "It's Cold" subtitled "Tribute to Ayla Reynolds" accompanied by a music video that highlights the cause of disappeared children.

== See also ==
- List of people who disappeared mysteriously: post-1970
