= Murder of Alisha Heinrich =

Formerly unidentified American decedent

Alisha Heinrich
- Alisha Heinrich, c. 1982
- Born: Alisha Ann Heinrich; May 24, 1981
- Disappeared: c. November 24, 1982 (aged 18 months); Kansas City, Missouri, U.S.
- Status: Identified after 38 years
- Died: December 3 or 4, 1982 (aged 18 months)
- Cause of death: Homicide by forced drowning
- Body discovered: December 5, 1982; Moss Point, Mississippi, United States
- Resting place: Jackson County Memorial Park, Pascagoula, Mississippi, United States; 30.3567°N 88.5147°W (approximate)
- Other names: Delta Dawn, Baby Jane
- Known for: Formerly unidentified victim of homicide
- Height: 2 ft 5 in (0.74 m) - 2 ft 6 in (0.76 m)
- Parent: Gwendolyn Mae Clemons (mother)

Alisha Ann Heinrich, previously known as "Baby Jane" and "Delta Dawn", was a formerly unidentified American child murder victim whose body was found in Moss Point, Mississippi, in December 1982. The child, aged approximately 18 months, was partially smothered before she was thrown alive from the eastbound Interstate 10 bridge into the Escatawpa River, where she ultimately drowned. Her body was recovered between 36 and 48 hours after her death.

On December 4, 2020, investigators announced that Heinrich had been identified via genetic genealogy research. Heinrich and her mother, 23-year-old Gwendolyn Mae Clemons, had been missing since approximately November 24, 1982, from Kansas City, Missouri. Clemons is believed to have been a distressed woman seen carrying an infant on December 3, 1982, close to the location where Heinrich's body was discovered. Although a witness reported seeing an adult female's body in the same river, no further remains were ever recovered; Clemons is still considered a missing person.

Prior to her identification, Heinrich was known as both "Delta Dawn" and "Baby Jane" due to her sex, her age, and the fact her body was discovered at daybreak close to a delta of the Escatawpa River.

== Interstate 10 bridge ==
According to numerous eyewitnesses, in the early hours of December 3, 1982 a female toddler was seen in the area of Moss Point, Mississippi, in the company of a young adult female presumed to have been her mother and who had been carrying the toddler in her arms. These sightings had occurred on both Mississippi State Highway 63 and, later, the National Interstate 10, close to the state border of Alabama. The woman carrying the child had been wearing a blue plaid shirt and blue jeans, and was last seen walking west along Interstate 10, close to the truck scales at the Alabama-Mississippi border sometime between midnight and one o'clock in the morning of December 3. Reportedly, the woman had been in an acute state of distress, but had ardently refused any offers of help from passing vehicles. These eyewitness reports subsequently given to investigators would further be corroborated by accounts from a woman who had been monitoring CB radio conversations between truck drivers early in the morning of December 3, and who stated to investigators numerous truck drivers had been raising what she termed a "boatload of hell" regarding an obviously distressed woman walking along Interstate 10 with a barefoot, coatless female toddler in her arms and who had repeatedly refused any offers of assistance from passing vehicles. It is believed that the toddler in this woman's company may have been the victim subsequently recovered from the river.

=== Discovery ===
Within two days of these sightings, at approximately 7:00 a.m. on December 5, a truck driver sighted the body of an adult female, clothed in a blue plaid shirt, floating face-down close to a bridge spanning the Escatawpa River along Interstate 10. The truck driver immediately reported his discovery to the Jackson County Sheriff's Office, and a sheriff's deputy immediately responded to the scene; finding no body floating in the general area of the river in which the body had been sighted, the deputy decided to continue the search, expanding the geographical search radius of the river as he did so. Shortly thereafter, he discovered the body of a small blond-haired child lying partially submerged and face up in the weeds close to the bridge. Authorities quickly determined the child had been thrown from the bridge into the general area where her body was subsequently found, and that the child's body was unlikely to have been that sighted by the truck driver, as the section of the Escatawpa River where her body was discovered had been heavily infested with weeds, thus making a sighting of any body in this section of water very difficult for passing motorists.

=== Subsequent search ===
Following the discovery of the child's body, the general vicinity of the Escatawpa River where the truck driver had sighted the body of the adult female was dragged in the hopes of also retrieving her body, although these efforts proved unsuccessful. The searches were conducted with the aid of helicopters and boats, although the body of the woman initially sighted within the Escatawpa River has never been found. (Note: The body of the adult female sighted by the truck driver is presumed to be that of the adult woman seen clutching the toddler in the early hours of December 3.) However, if the body seen floating in the river on December 5 was not hers, she has never been located alive, or presented herself to authorities. (Note: Prior to later developments, authorities would speculate the most likely scenario regarding these events was that the woman had attempted to smother the child, whom she had then thrown into the water before then jumping to her own death from the bridge.)

Although the underwater search unit failed to locate the body of the adult woman, the search unit did locate the largely skeletal remains of a young African-American male on December 8. His body was located beneath the eastbound I-10 bridge approximately 60 yards from the scene of the earlier discovery of the child's body. Investigators determined this individual had also been thrown over the I-10 bridge, although the victim had lain undiscovered for a minimum of six months, and had been shot to death, thus making his death extremely unlikely to be connected to the case. The man, previously referred to as Moss Point John Doe, was identified by investigators in 2022 as Gary Simpson of Louisiana. (Note: On March 22, 2022, Moss Point John Doe was identified via the usage of genetic genealogy analysis conducted by Othram Inc. as Gary Simpson (b. 1962) of Louisiana.)

== Physical examination ==
An autopsy performed on the child's body revealed that someone had attempted to smother her before she had entered the river, although the child had still been alive when she had entered the water, having inhaled murky water from the river into her lungs, thus indicating she had ultimately died of drowning. The official cause of death would be certified as drowning due to her having inhaled water upon impacting the surface of the river. Investigators would also conclude she had been intentionally deposited into the river from the eastbound I-10 bridge, very likely by the woman seen carrying her two days prior to her discovery (with the woman possibly believing the child had died via the act of smothering).

In life, Delta Dawn had been a healthy toddler, with her age estimated to have been between the ages of one and two years old, most likely being between eighteen months and two years of age. Twelve of her milk teeth had erupted at the time of her death, which influenced the age estimation. The girl was Caucasian, with curly strawberry-blond hair, and has been described as being markedly beautiful in appearance. Because the child's body had lain in the river for approximately 36 to 48 hours prior to her discovery, her eyes had clouded to such a degree that determining their precise color was very difficult, although it is believed they had been either blue or brown. Despite the elemental damage to the eyes, her face was described as being in a "recognizable" condition. She was around two feet six inches in height, weighed around 25 pounds and although no food was found in her stomach, she showed no signs of having been malnourished. The girl wore a pink and white Cradle Togs checkered dress, decorated with three flowers on its front, along with a diaper.

=== Funeral ===
The funeral of the then-unidentified child (who would become known as both "Delta Dawn" and "Baby Jane" to both the public and the media) was primarily funded by a local deputy named Virgil Moore who, along with his wife, Mary Ann, initiated a fundraising and donations appeal via local businesses and funeral homes to ensure the child received a Christian funeral, with Mary Ann Moore as the individual who coined the name "Baby Jane," having been aghast at the thought of the child being simply buried as a Jane Doe. (Note: Mary Ann Moore would name the then-unidentified child "Baby Jane," the name currently inscribed upon the child's granite grave marker within the Jackson County Cemetery.)

Delta Dawn was buried in the Jackson County Cemetery following an hour-long service conducted at the Bethel Assembly Church in Pascagoula. The service was conducted within weeks of the child's discovery, after all efforts to locate any relatives had proven fruitless. The service itself was attended by approximately 200 people, with four police officers serving as pallbearers. The primary means of paying for and conducting the child's funeral were donations by various local businesses and their employees, and Delta Dawn was buried beneath a flat granite marker with a ceramic vase. Her grave bears the inscriptions "Baby Jane" and "Known Only To God".

On the 25th anniversary of the funeral of Delta Dawn, a memorial service in her honor was held at the Bethel Assembly Church. The memorial service was organized by two Alabama women named Marjorie Brinker and Lynn Reuss, who have both stated they could not comprehend "why someone would throw a baby into the river like that."

"She belongs to somebody. And, if she's not remembered, it's not going to be put out anymore. It's just ... time is going to pass on by. And this way here, if we keep her in the light, somebody may just come forward."

— Paul Murphy; Deputy sheriff on duty at the time of the recovery of the body of Delta Dawn from the Escatawpa River, 2007.

== Investigation ==
Extensive searches were conducted to find the body of the woman seen floating face-down within the Escatawpa River on December 5; equal efforts have been made to locate and/or identify the acutely distressed woman seen walking along Interstate 10 carrying a barefooted child in her arms on December 3, should the body sighted by the truck driver actually not have been hers. All efforts proved fruitless. Several scenarios surrounding the death of Delta Dawn have been theorized, with the most common contemporary assertion being that the woman seen with the toddler was the child's mother, who had either accidentally or intentionally caused the child's death before subsequently committing suicide.

Following the discovery of Delta Dawn, newspapers throughout the country published stories of the discovery of the child's body, and the sightings on Interstate 10 two days previously. These stories often featured contemporary forensic facial reconstructions of how the child had most likely appeared in life. All initial efforts proved unsuccessful with ascertaining the identity of Delta Dawn via this technique. A contemporary report of a woman who informed sheriff's deputies that she had "given away" her child to a group of men was originally connected to the case by the investigating officers, although these investigators rapidly determined that the subject requesting assistance had a male child, thus enabling investigators to quickly determine this report as being irrelevant to this case.

In 2009, the body of Delta Dawn was exhumed in order that investigators could obtain a DNA sample from her body which could be entered into both the National Missing and Unidentified Persons System and the National Center for Missing & Exploited Children databases for comparison with nationwide unsolved murders and missing person reports. Initially, no DNA match with Delta Dawn or the individual believed to have been her mother was obtained.

Two forensic facial reconstructions of Delta Dawn prior to her 2020 identification. The most recent rendering (right) was created in 2014.

With advances in technology, several forensic facial reconstructions of the child were created in the years following the discovery of her body in ongoing efforts to identify her. The National Center for Missing & Exploited Children also released two illustrations depicting potential likenesses as to how Delta Dawn may have physically appeared in her life; other forensic artists also produced their own renderings in efforts to discover her identity.

== Identification ==
On December 4, 2020, Jackson County Sheriff's Office announced the identification of Delta Dawn as 18-month-old Alisha Ann Heinrich of Joplin, Missouri. Her identity was confirmed via DNA sequencing and genetic genealogy, with the child's DNA linked to family members in Missouri, where her mother, Gwendolyn Mae Clemons, had previously lived. The process of generating a profile suitable for uploading into a public genealogy database was performed by a lab operated by Othram Inc.; the research was conducted by forensic genealogists under Redgrave Research Forensic Services.

Gwendolyn Clemons had recently divorced from the father of her daughter. She, her daughter, and an unnamed boyfriend had reportedly disappeared "on or around" November 24, 1982, from the family's residence in Kansas City, Missouri. The intent of their departure was to relocate to the state of Florida, with Clemons informing her relatives of her intentions to start life anew in this state. The boyfriend later returned to Missouri alone. The man, now deceased, has been described as both a "person of interest" and a suspect in various media reports.

The circumstances surrounding Alisha's death, and the simultaneous disappearance of her mother, remain under active investigation by the Jackson County Sheriff's department. Investigators remain uncertain as to Clemons' ultimate fate. At a press conference held on December 4, 2020, Sheriff Mike Ezell informed reporters: "We do not know if she is dead or alive at this point. We're assuming the worst, but we don't know that for sure."

Prior to the Jackson County Sheriff's Department's formal announcement of the identity of Delta Dawn as Alisha Ann Heinrich, the previously unknown woman accompanying the child upon the eastbound Interstate 10 bridge was theorized to have been responsible for her death in a suspected murder-suicide, although this theory is now in doubt.

== See also ==
- Murder of Bella Bond
- Crime in Mississippi
- List of murdered American children
- List of solved missing person cases (1980s)
- List of unsolved murders (1980–1999)
- Murder of Riley Ann Sawyers

== Cited works and further reading ==
- Evans, Colin (1996). The Casebook of Forensic Detection: How Science Solved 100 of the World's Most Baffling Crimes. New York: John Wiley & Sons Inc. ISBN 0-471-07650-3.
- Halber, Deborah (2015). The Skeleton Crew: How Amateur Sleuths Are Solving America's Coldest Cases. New York: Simon & Schuster. ISBN 978-1-451-65758-6.
- Meyer, Cheryl; Oberman, Michelle; White, Kelly (2001). Mothers who Kill Their Children. New York University Press. ISBN 0-814-75643-3
- Newton, Michael (2004). The Encyclopedia of Unsolved Crimes. New York: Facts on File. ISBN 978-0-816-07818-9.
