= Murder of Riley Ann Sawyers =

Murder of American child

Riley Ann Sawyers
- Undated photo of Sawyers
- Born: Riley Ann Sawyers; March 11, 2005; Mentor, Ohio, U.S.
- Died: July 24, 2007 (aged 2 years 4 months); Spring, Texas, U.S.
- Cause of death: Homicide by beating
- Body discovered: October 29, 2007; Galveston Bay, Texas
- Resting place: Ashes buried at Mentor Municipal Cemetery, Mentor, Ohio; 41.6387°N 81.3178°W (approximate)
- Other name: Baby Grace
- Known for: Victim of child abuse, filicide, and child murder
- Parent(s): Kimberly Dawn Trenor (mother); Robert Sawyers (father)

Riley Ann Sawyers (March 11, 2005 – July 24, 2007) was a two-year-old American girl who was beaten to death by her mother Kimberly Dawn Trenor and her mother's partner Royce Zeigler in a filicide. Her body was later found in Galveston Bay, Texas.

The level of decomposition meant that police were unable to immediately identify the remains and began a nationwide effort to learn the child's name. Riley Ann's identity was confirmed when her paternal grandmother, Sheryl Sawyers, notified police after seeing a composite sketch. Her remains were then positively identified through DNA testing on November 30, 2007.

Prior to her 2007 identification, Riley Ann Sawyers was known as Baby Grace due to her age and sex.

== Home environment ==
Riley Ann was the daughter of Robert Thomas Sawyers and Kimberly Dawn Trenor. Her mother became pregnant at the age of 15 when the pair developed a relationship while students at Mentor High School. Her father dropped out of high school during his junior year. The family lived in Mentor, Ohio, with Robert's mother, Sheryl, who was Riley Ann's primary caregiver. During this time, Riley Ann's parents grew apart and were no longer a couple. They all continued to live in the same home. Riley Ann's father began dating a woman named Catherine Priester, whom he later married. In October 2006, alleging physical abuse and having filed a domestic violence charge against Trenor, Sawyers left the home. In May 2007, Trenor and Riley Ann moved to Spring, Texas. Trenor married Royce Clyde Zeigler Jr. on June 1, 2007. Trenor met Royce Zeigler while playing World of Warcraft; Robert Sawyers had introduced the game to her and Trenor began putting a lot of time and energy into it.

Zeigler believed Riley Ann should be disciplined to say "sir" and "ma'am" to adults, as well as "please" and "thank you", and that corporal punishment was the best means of disciplining a child. Believing that Trenor was not properly administering the beatings, Zeigler himself beat the child. Zeigler's former stepmother explained that his father had used similar methods to raise his children, which often involved abuse. Other ex-wives also gave recollections of Zeigler's father's abuse and likened the circumstances to that surrounding the death of Riley Ann.

== Death of Riley Ann ==
In a videotaped confession and signed affidavit, Trenor admitted that on July 24, 2007, she and Zeigler beat Riley Ann with two leather belts and held her head underwater in the bathtub. Trenor also stated that Zeigler picked Riley Ann up by her hair and threw her across the room, causing her head to slam into the tile floor. Riley Ann, having been injured by the beating, was unable to stand up when ordered to do so. "She didn't have control of her legs," Trenor stated. The child had also tried to hinder the beating by saying "I love you" to her mother as the abuse that night took place. She maintained that the death was accidental and that it was "a case of discipline that went too far". When they realized Riley Ann was dead, Trenor and Zeigler went to Walmart to buy a Sterilite plastic storage container. They wrapped Riley Ann's body in garbage bags and stuffed it into the plastic container. They kept this container in a storage shed for about two months before transporting it by vehicle and dumping it into Galveston Bay from a bridge near the Galveston Causeway.

Trenor forged legal documents as an attempt to conceal the murder. Such documents cited that Riley Ann had been removed from their custody due to alleged "sexual abuse." She claimed Zeigler had forced her to do so.

A forensic facial reconstruction of Riley Ann Sawyers (left), alongside an image as to how Riley Ann had physically appeared in life

== Discovery and investigation ==
Riley Ann's body was discovered in Galveston Bay by a fisherman on October 29, 2007. A coroner discovered three skull fractures on the body, and the investigation then proceeded as a homicide case. The extent of the injuries was described as having similar force to falling from a rooftop. After police were unable to identify the remains, forensic artist Lois Gibson was recruited to create a forensic sketch to illustrate an estimation of the victim's appearance during life, as the body was unrecognizable. The unidentified body was then nicknamed "Baby Grace."

National efforts began to uncover the identity of the remains and the reconstruction was released to the public. Eventually, Riley Ann's paternal grandmother, Sheryl, reported to authorities that the sketch resembled her granddaughter. Sheryl had discovered the sketch online when she made the connection between the cases. DNA testing later confirmed that the remains were that of the child, as authorities had already suspected, given the statements made by Riley's grandmother.

== Trials ==
Shortly before Thanksgiving Day in 2007, Zeigler attempted suicide by overdosing on blood pressure medication and prescribed anti-depressant pills. He left a suicide note stating, "My wife is innocent of the sins I committed". However, he later claimed during his trial that he was in another room of the house when Riley Ann died, and therefore could not have been guilty.

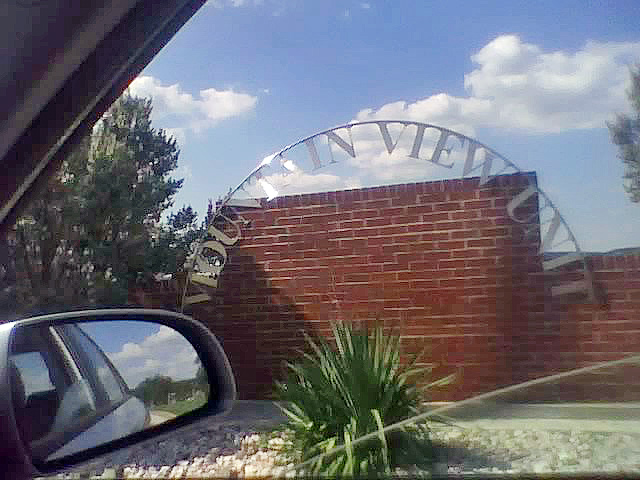
The Mountain View Unit. Kimberly Dawn Trenor is currently incarcerated within this facility

Following their arrests, the pair were held at separate bonds of $350,000 each. They had initially been charged with injury to a child and tampering with evidence. The trial for Trenor was delayed due to her becoming pregnant and it was postponed until after she gave birth in January 2009.

=== Murder convictions ===
Trenor and Zeigler eventually took responsibility for Riley Ann's death. Trenor was convicted of capital murder on February 2, 2009. It took the jury 90 minutes to reach a verdict. She was sentenced to life in prison without the possibility of parole. She is incarcerated in the Mountain View Unit in Gatesville, Texas.

Zeigler was charged with capital murder and evidence tampering. On November 6, 2009, he was convicted and received an automatic sentence of life in prison without possibility of parole. The sentence was automatic because the state did not seek the death penalty. Such verdict was reached after four hours and thirty minutes of conversation by the jury. He is incarcerated in the Wallace Pack Unit near Navasota, Texas.

== Aftermath ==
On January 14, 2008, the cremated remains of Riley Ann were turned over to her family in Ohio, after a Texas judge ruled that evidence collected during the autopsy would be sufficient for trial. Sheryl Sawyers' employer also raised money through a fundraiser to pay for the child's funeral. A ceremony later took place and Riley Ann's remains were interred at the Mentor Municipal Cemetery. As many as twenty countries reportedly performed a similar memorial service for the victim.

The Hitchcock City Commission in Texas named "Riley's Island" after the victim in March 2008.

== See also ==
- List of solved missing person cases (2000s)

== In media ==
=== Television ===
- The Investigation Discovery channel has broadcast an episode focusing upon the murder of Riley Ann Sawyers. This episode was first broadcast in June 2011.

== See also ==
- Cold case
- Delta Dawn
- Unidentified decedent
