= Murder of Erica Green =

American murder victim formerly known as "Precious Doe"

Erica Green
- Image of Erica Green (left) compared to a facial reconstruction created in effort to identify her
- Born: Erica Michelle Marie Green; May 15, 1997; McLoud, Oklahoma, U.S.
- Died: April 28, 2001 (aged 3); Kansas City, Missouri, U.S.
- Body discovered: On April 28, 2001 (body); May 1, 2001 (head)
- Resting place: Memorial Park Cemetery, Kansas City, Missouri, U.S.

Erica Michelle Marie Green (May 15, 1997 – April 28, 2001), also known as Precious Doe, was an American three-year-old girl who was murdered in Kansas City, Missouri, in April 2001. Green's decapitated body was discovered on April 28, 2001, and her head was found nearby on May 1, but she remained unidentified until May 5, 2005. Green's murder attracted significant media and public attention due to the brutality of the crime and the lengthy period without identification.

In 2008, Green's mother and step-father were convicted for her murder.

== Discovery ==
On April 28, 2001, while authorities were conducting a search for an unrelated missing persons case, the decapitated body of a young African-American girl was found near Hibbs Park at 59th Street and Kensington Avenue in Kansas City, Missouri. On May 1, 2001, the child's head was found wrapped in a trash bag approximately 150 to 200 yards southeast of the body discovery site. Investigators determined that she had been beaten with an ashtray found with the body and kicked several times, causing extensive injuries throughout her body, and then decapitated in an effort to keep police from being able to identify the body. The ashtray lacked DNA or fingerprints, and the unidentified girl was known by the multiple-use name Precious Doe, which was used in public broadcasts in an effort to identify her.

== Media appearances ==
The brutality of the crime, and the fact that Green went unidentified for a long period, sparked nationwide interest in an effort to identify her. Police released sketches, computerized facial reconstructions, and at least two busts. The case was featured on the TV programs America's Most Wanted and Cold Case Files several times.

== Identification ==
On May 5, 2005, Precious Doe was identified as Erica Green, a three-year-old from Oklahoma. Her mother, Michelle Johnson (also known as Michelle Pierce), and her stepfather, Harrell Johnson, were charged with murder and extradited from Oklahoma to face charges in Missouri. Michelle Johnson's eight other children were taken into state custody or placed with relatives. On December 3, 2005, prosecutors announced that they would seek the death penalty against Erica's stepfather, Harrell Johnson.

Police stated that Green had died after being brutally beaten by Johnson with an ashtray for refusing to go to bed. Johnson then used a pair of hedge clippers to sever her head. Johnson's cousin, Lawanda Driskell, said that Erica's mother helped Harrell dispose of the body by taking Erica from the house as if sleeping in a stroller and telling Driskell she had given Erica to the woman who had raised her while Johnson was in prison.

== Conviction ==
On October 8, 2008, Harrell Johnson was convicted of first-degree murder and sentenced to life in prison. On October 22, 2008, Michelle Johnson was sentenced to 25 years in prison, in exchange for her 2007 guilty plea to second-degree murder and testimony against her husband.

== See also ==
- List of solved missing person cases (2000s)
- Murder of Anjelica Castillo
- Murder of Atcel Olmedo
- Murder of Evelyn Colon
- St. Louis Jane Doe, a similar case in Missouri
