= Watts Township, Pennsylvania =

Township in Pennsylvania, US

Coordinates: 40°28′00″N 77°00′59″W

- Township
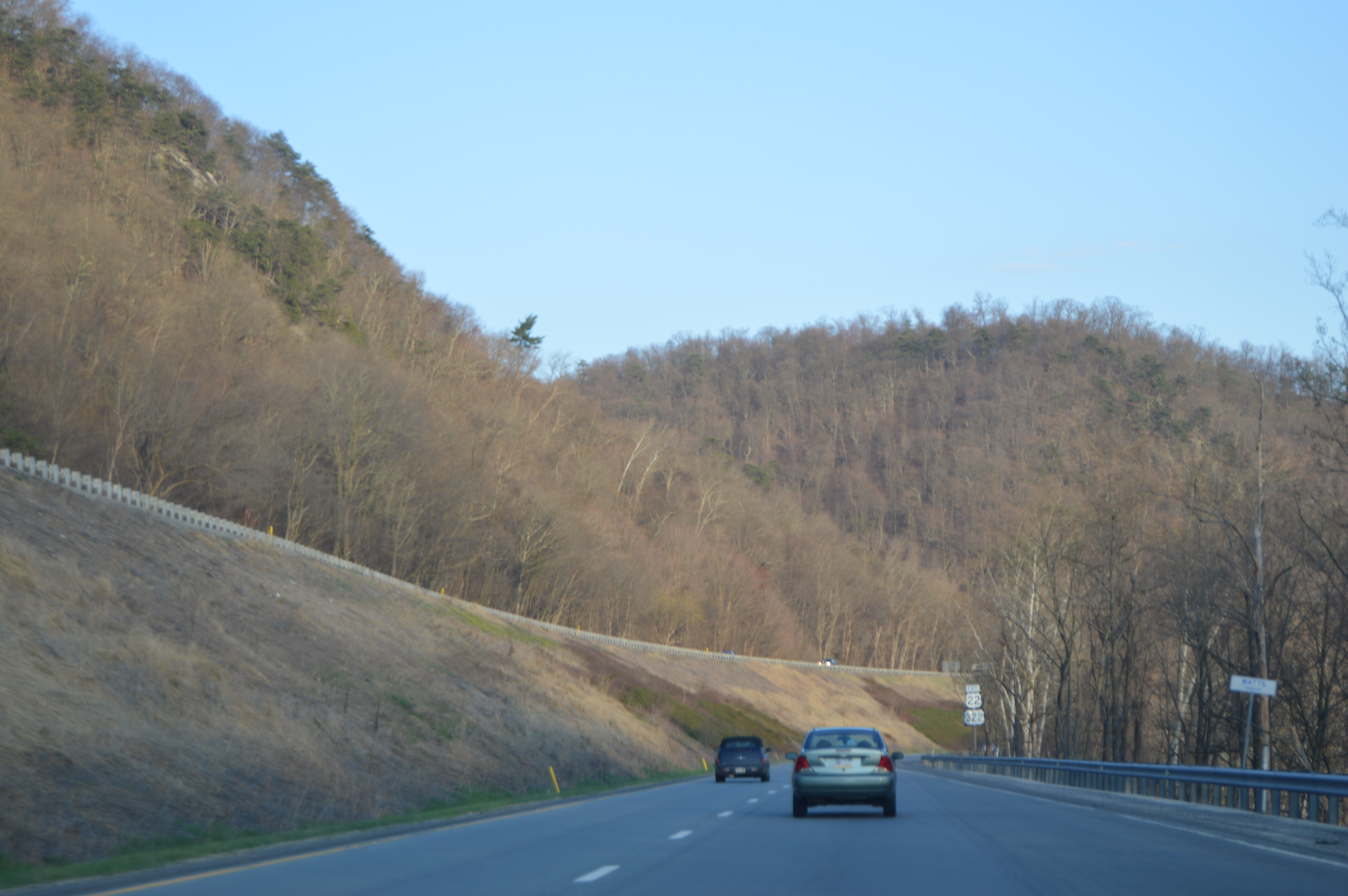
- Along U.S. Routes 22-322 northwest of New Buffalo

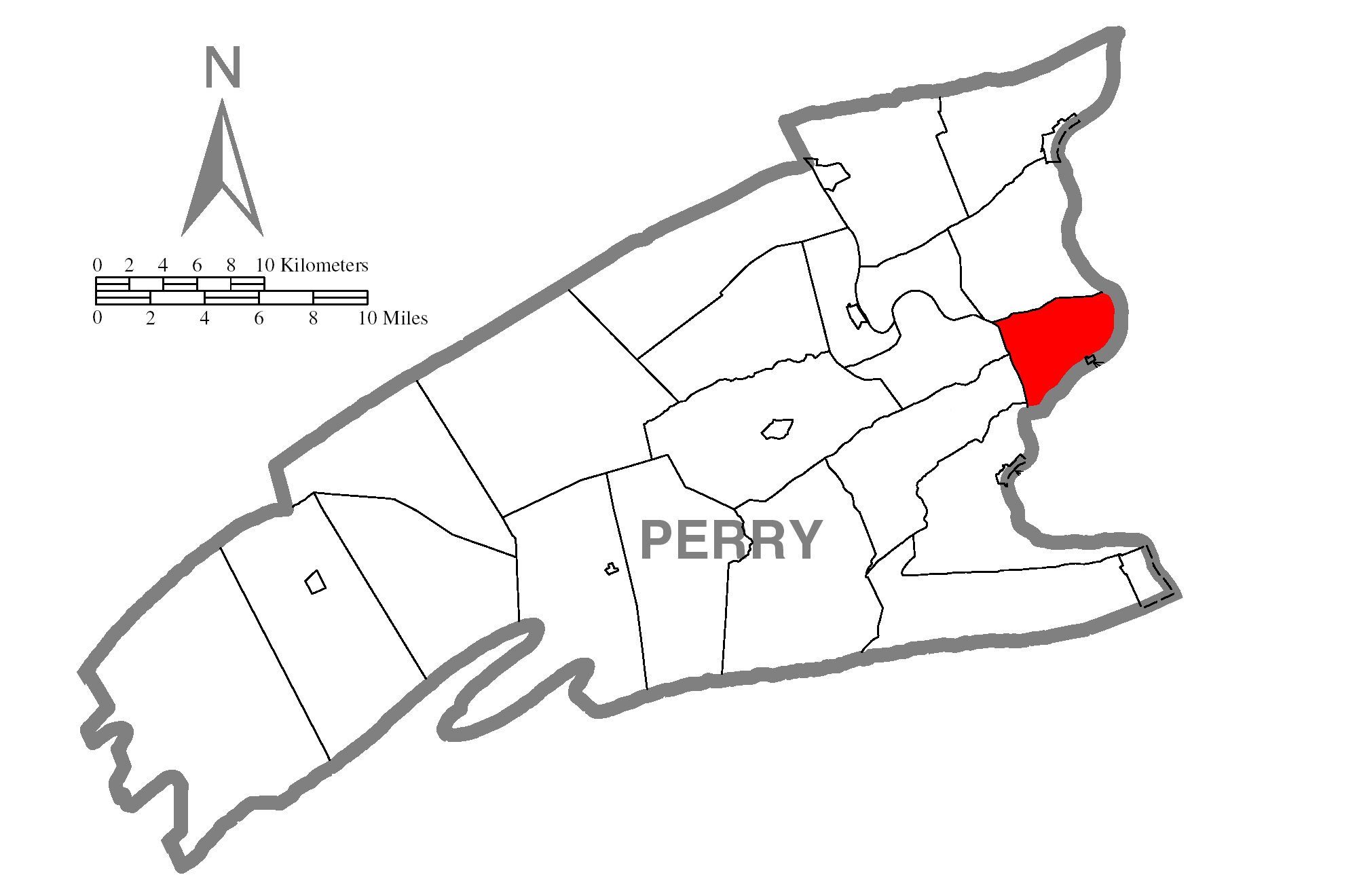
- Map of Perry County, Pennsylvania highlighting Watts Township

- Map of Perry County, Pennsylvania
- Country: United States
- State: Pennsylvania
- County: Perry
- Settled: 1792
- Incorporated: 1849

Area
  - Total: 12.17 sq mi (31.53 km^{2})
  - Land: 11.88 sq mi (30.76 km^{2})
  - Water: 0.30 sq mi (0.77 km^{2})

Population (2020)
  - Total: 1,233 ▼
  - Estimate (2023): 1,245
  - Density: 106.7/sq mi (41.19/km^{2})
- Time zone: UTC-5 (Eastern (EST))
  - Summer (DST): UTC-4 (EDT)
- Area code: 717
- FIPS code: 42-099-81640
- Website: Watts Township Municipal Website

Watts Township is a township in Perry County, Pennsylvania, United States. The population was 1,233 at the 2020 census.

== Geography ==
According to the United States Census Bureau, the township has a total area of 12.0 square miles (31.0 km^{2}), of which 11.7 square miles (30.2 km^{2}) is land and 0.3 square miles (0.7 km^{2}) (2.34%) is water.

== Demographics ==
Historical population
Census	Pop.	Note	%±
2010	1,265		—
2020	1,233		−2.5%
2023 (est.)	1,245		1.0%
U.S. Decennial Census

As of the census of 2000, there were 1,196 people, 447 households and 333 families residing in the township. The population density was 102.4 inhabitants per square mile (39.5/km^{2}). There were 482 housing units at an average density of 41.3 per square mile (15.9/km^{2}). The racial makeup of the township was 99.25% White, 0.08% African American, 0.25% Native American, 0.25% Asian, and 0.17% from two or more races. Hispanic or Latino of any race were 0.42% of the population.

There were 447 households, of which 34.0% had children under the age of 18 living with them, 66.9% were married couples living together, 5.6% had a female householder with no husband present, and 25.3% were non-families. 19.7% of all households were made up of individuals, and 7.2% had someone living alone who was 65 years of age or older. The average household size was 2.65 and the average family size was 3.06.

In the township the population was spread out, with 26.1% under the age of 18, 5.9% from 18 to 24, 31.5% from 25 to 44, 26.3% from 45 to 64, and 10.1% who were 65 years of age or older. The median age was 37 years. For every 100 females there were 101.3 males. For every 100 females age 18 and over, there were 101.4 males.

The median income for a household in the township was $44,583 and the median income for a family was $52,250. Males had a median income of $33,365 versus $26,500 for females. The per capita income for the township was $18,981. About 3.9% of families and 4.0% of the population were below the poverty line, including 3.0% of those under age 18 and 6.3% of those age 65 or over.
