= Murder of Evelyn Colon =

1976 murder in the United States

Evelyn Colon
- Digitally enhanced photograph of Evelyn Colon
- Born: April 17, 1961
- Disappeared: Jersey City, New Jersey, U.S.
- Status: Identified after 44 years
- Died: c. December 13–19, 1976 (aged 15)
- Cause of death: Strangulation
- Body discovered: December 20, 1976
- Resting place: Laurytown Road Cemetery, Weatherly, Pennsylvania, U.S.
- Known for: Formerly unidentified victim of homicide
- Height: 4 ft 11 in (1.50 m) (minimum); 5 ft 4 in (1.63 m) (maximum)

Evelyn Colon (previously known as Beth Doe; April 17, 1961 – December 1976) was a formerly unidentified American teenager from New Jersey who was found murdered and dismembered in three suitcases along with her unborn daughter on December 20, 1976, in White Haven, Pennsylvania. The brutality of the crime, the fact that she was pregnant when she was killed and the length of time that she remained unidentified drew national attention.

After isotope analysis was conducted in 2007, it was believed she had been an immigrant from a Central European country. In 2019, it was announced police were considering the possibility that this victim had been a runaway foster child who was last known to be in New York, but investigators subsequently located the girl and confirmed that she was alive.

On March 31, 2021, it was officially announced that the victim had been identified as 15-year-old Evelyn Colon of Jersey City, New Jersey. In addition, the identity of her alleged killer, Luis Sierra, was made public after charges were filed. As of January 2025, these charges have been dismissed, as authorities determined her murder happened in New Jersey, and not Pennsylvania.

== Death and discovery ==
When discovered, the victim, who was carrying a nine-month female fetus, had been sexually assaulted, strangled and shot in the neck by an unknown person. Her body was then dismembered with a serrated blade. The gunshot wound had occurred postmortem. Her nose, breasts, and ears had been severed and have never been found. The dismemberment was described to be unlike that of a surgeon, but not "haphazard."

The parts of her body and that of her unborn daughter had been placed into three suitcases; two were striped with red, blue, and white, and the other one was tan with a plaid design. They were of vinyl material and were all of the same size. It was evident that the suitcases had been spray-painted black at some point and that their handles had been severed.

To dispose of the body, the suitcases had been thrown off a bridge over the Lehigh River in White Haven, Pennsylvania along Interstate 80. It is believed that the suitcases had been thrown out of a vehicle traveling west. The killer had most likely intended to have the suitcases land in the water below, to lessen the chance of them being found. Two of the suitcases had landed in the woods, 20 feet from the river; the third, containing the head and fetus, was found on the river bank.

Having fallen approximately 300 feet, two of the suitcases had opened and parts of the body had emerged. The head, fetus, and the two halves of the torso were exposed.

Other evidence included straw and packaging foam, as well as a bedspread that was waterlogged with fragments of a newspaper that had been used to wrap parts of the body. The newspaper was later determined to have been The New York Sunday from September 26, 1976, and was linked to northern New Jersey. The bedspread was reddish-orange in color with yellow and pink embroidered flowers, and was made of chenille fabric.

== Examination and physical description ==
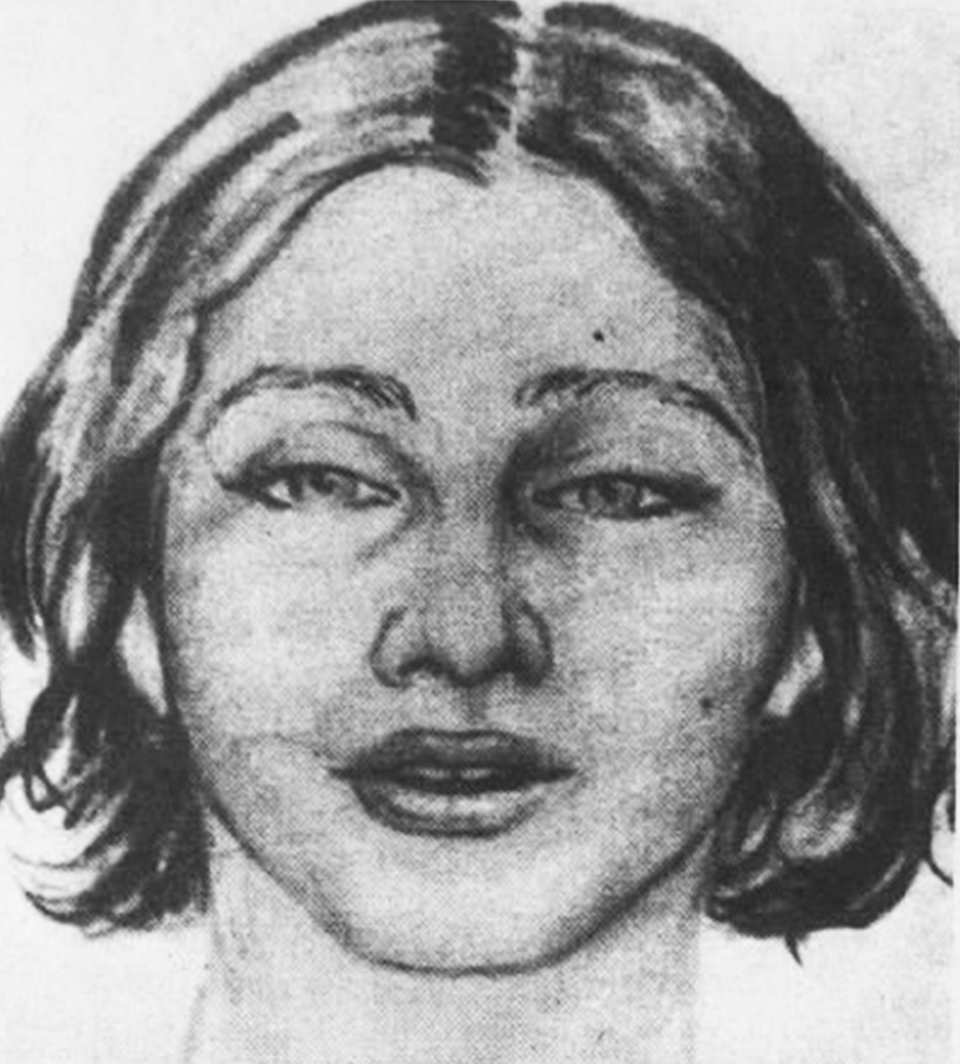
The original sketch of the victim created around the time her body was found

The body was removed by authorities and transported in plastic bags to the nearby Gnadden Huetten Hospital for examination.

After a three-hour autopsy on December 23, 1976, it was determined that she was a white woman in her late teens or early twenties. However, her identity could not be established. The cause of death was determined to be strangulation, although she had been shot in the neck as well.

Beth Doe was between 4 feet 11 inches and 5 feet 4 inches tall. She weighed 140 to 150 pounds (due to her pregnancy). Her hair, which was shoulder-length, was an undyed dark brown. The medical examiner classified her blood as type O.

She had some distinctive markings on her body. A 2- to 6-inch scar was visible above one of her heels. Two moles on her face - one above her left eye and one on her left cheek - may have developed during her pregnancy.

Before becoming a teen, some of her molars had been extracted, and she had received fillings in her teeth. No false teeth were in place. Despite the evidence of previous care, she had likely not seen a dentist in some time, as she was suffering from severe tooth decay. One of her front incisors had a visible fracture, which was noted to likely cause severe pain.

It was believed that she was probably born in Europe and moved to the United States before reaching her teenage years, as examination of her tooth enamel indicated. An initial anthropological examination indicated she may have originated from Serbia or Croatia. Isotope testing was conducted on her hair, teeth, and bones. She had lived in the U.S. for 5 to 10 years, and most likely had resided in Tennessee or a nearby state. Examination on the unborn girl indicated that the child had gestated while the victim was in the southeastern part of the country.

== Investigation ==
Reconstructions of the three suitcases in which Colon, then unidentified, was found

Latest facial reconstructions, depicting the victim with different hair lengths and an approximation of her nose

After the body was found, the victim was fingerprinted. Her teeth were examined and recorded on a dental chart. Missing persons reports throughout the United States and Canada were compared at the time to the victim but were excluded.

The medical examiner noted that a set of numbers had been written on the victim's body. The ink, believed to have been from a pen, was on the left palm of the victim, indicating that she was right-handed if she had indeed written it herself. The writing consisted of the letters WSR and the number 4 or 5, followed by 4 or 7.

Her fingerprints were submitted to the FBI, but they did not match anyone in national databases. When she remained unidentified, a sketch was made and the public was asked for assistance. This resulted in few solid leads. Information about the case was subsequently published across the country to generate leads.

The body was buried in 1983 after the victim remained unidentified for several years. In 2007, her remains were exhumed to obtain additional forensic evidence and to create a new facial reconstruction. The National Center for Missing and Exploited Children released two reconstructions, the latest in May 2015.

Investigators remained optimistic about identifying the remains and solving her murder.

Twelve missing women had been excluded as possible identities:

- Annastaes Banitskas of Australia
- Iris Brown of Vermont
- Valerie Cuccia of New York
- Teresa Fittin of Florida
- Trenny Gibson of Tennessee
- Rory Kesinger of Massachusetts
- Anna Leatherwood of Tennessee
- Georgia Nolan of Kentucky
- Sherry Roach of California
- Mary Robinson of New York
- Patricia Seelbaugh of Pennsylvania
- Denise Sheehy of New York

=== Later developments ===
In September 2019, the Pennsylvania State Police announced a possible connection between "Beth Doe" and Madeline "Maggie" Cruz. A tip was submitted to police by an individual who had gone to school with Cruz and saw a resemblance to the reconstructions of Beth Doe. She had spent time in the Massachusetts cities of Lenox and Framingham; in Framingham she resided with a foster family. Around 1974, at the approximate age of sixteen, she had run away, to Tarrytown with her foster sister, who returned after a week. In the summer of 1976, she called a friend to request money, claiming she was pregnant. She was never heard from again, until the media reported the potential link to Beth Doe. Later that month, police confirmed Cruz was "alive and well" and subsequently eliminated as a potential identity.

== Identification ==
Familial DNA eventually led investigators to Luis Colon Jr., Evelyn Colon's nephew. Colon's identity was released on March 31, 2021. She was fifteen at the time she was allegedly murdered by then-19-year-old Luis Sierra. Sierra was subsequently charged with the victim's murder; at the time of his arrest, he was residing in Ozone Park, New York and was 63. He was extradited back to Pennsylvania, and he first appeared in court on April 28.

At the time of her murder, Colon, who was of Puerto Rican origin, was dating Sierra, the father of her unborn child, in Jersey City. Due to her pregnancy, Colon's parents recently had allowed her to move into an apartment with Sierra, who had also previously been the Colons' next-door neighbor. One day, Colon contacted her mother saying she was not feeling well and asking her to bring her soup, but when Colon's mother arrived, nobody was there. Neighbours told Colon's family that she and Sierra had moved away. In January 1977, the family received a letter in Spanish from Sierra, stamped from Connecticut, telling them Colon had given birth to a boy and not to worry, because she would contact them if she needed anything. Colon's family initially did not report her missing because, according to her brother Luis Colon, they thought she was safe with Sierra. After a few years of no contact, they attempted to report her disappearance, but due to the letter police refused to file a report. By the time Colon was identified, her parents had both died. Colon was revealed to have distant family members living in Puerto Rico and a GoFundMe campaign was organized by her family members in the mainland United States to get them to visit her gravesite.

== See also ==
- List of murdered American children
- List of solved missing person cases (1970s)
- List of unsolved murders (1900–1979)
- Murder of Erica Green (a young girl who was murdered in a similar manner in 2001 and was unidentified until 2005)
- Murder of Ruth Waymire
