= Othram =

American forensic genealogy company

- Industry: Biotechnology, body identification
- Founded: 2018; 8 years ago
- Founder: David Mittelman
- Headquarters: The Woodlands, Texas, U.S.
- Website: www.othram.com

Othram (also Othram Inc.) is an American corporation specializing in forensic genetic genealogy to resolve unsolved murders, disappearances, and identification of unidentified decedents or murder victims (colloquially known as John Does and Jane Does). The company offers law enforcement agencies tools and programs to infer kinship among individuals, closely and distantly related, through a combination of short tandem repeat and single nucleotide polymorphism testing, as well as forensic genome sequencing of DNA.

Othram has assisted with identifications of cold cases such as Beth Doe, Septic Tank Sam, and Delta Dawn. Many cases are not publicized until after a successful identification.

Othram technology and casework inspired the 500th episode of Law & Order: Special Victims Unit.

== Notable cases ==
=== Suspect identifications ===
These are cases where Othram has sequenced DNA and returned forensic genetic genealogy leads for the suspect in a violent crime, such as a sexual assault or homicide.

==== Murder of Carla Walker ====
Carla Walker was a 17-year-old girl who was abducted from a bowling alley in Fort Worth, Texas, on February 15, 1974. She and her boyfriend, Rodney McCoy, had been sitting in her car outside of the alley after attending a school dance at Western Hills High School when they were attacked by an unknown assailant who pistol whipped Roy, leaving him unconscious. Walker's body was later recovered three days later from a cow culvert, half an hour south of Fort Worth. She had been beaten, tortured, raped and strangled to death, as well as injected with morphine.

Othram Inc. was contacted in April or May 2020 to use forensic genealogy on DNA left on Walker's body to identify her killer. On September 21, 2020, it was announced that Glen Samuel McCurley, 77 at the time of his arrest, was charged with Walker's murder based on a DNA match.

==== Murder of Christine Jessop ====
Christine Jessop was a 9-year-old girl from Queensville, Ontario, who was abducted after getting off her school bus in October 1984. She went home, dropped off her bag, and planned on meeting with a friend at a nearby park. She never made it to the park. Her body was later recovered on December 31 in a farmer's field in Sunderland, Ontario. She had been raped and stabbed to death, with semen being found on her underwear.

In 2019, the Toronto Police Service contacted Othram to generate a DNA profile from the semen found on Jessop's clothing and perform forensic genealogy to find her killer. After Othram was able to successfully sequence a profile, Toronto Police were able to find her killer in the fall. It was announced on October 15, that Calvin Hoover, a man who died in 2015, matched the profile of DNA and was named as her killer.

==== Murder of Siobhan McGuinness ====
Siobhan McGuinness was a 5-year-old girl from Missoula, Montana, who was abducted in early 1974 while walking to a friend's house. Her body was found two days later in a snowy culvert. She had been raped and stabbed to death. An extensive investigation between law enforcement and the community was made in order to find her killer until all leads were exhausted.

In 2020, the Missoula Police Department, BODE Technology, and the FBI contacted Othram to create a genetic profile from DNA found on the crime scene, after similar techniques were used to identify the Golden State Killer. After a profile was made, the team used forensic genealogy to find Richard William Davis, who was confirmed by DNA to be her killer. Davis had died in 2012.

==== Killing of Mary Theresa Simpson ====
On March 15, 1964, Mary Theresa Simpson was reported missing, her remains were found four days later. She had been kidnapped, sexually assaulted and killed in a wooded area southwest of Elmira. For 62 years her assailant was unknown, but in 2023 investigators partnered with Othram and students from Russell Sage College to conduct genealogical analysis, identifying Alfred Murray Jr. (died 2004) as a possible suspect, the first time he had been considered one in the case.

Investigators then collected a DNA sample from his son, which confirmed that his DNA was related to the DNA found on Simpson's skirt. In November of that year, investigators exhumed the body of Murray, and compared his DNA to the DNA from Simpson's skirt. They found that the odds of that DNA belonging to a person other than Murray were less than 1 in 320 billion. On February 10, 2026, the Elmira Police Department held a press conference announcing that they believe that Murray killed Simpson, making it the 18th case in the state of New York solved by Othram.

=== Unidentified remains cases ===
These are cases where Othram has sequenced DNA and used forensic genetic genealogy to identify an unidentified decedent.

==== Alisha Heinrich AKA "Delta Dawn" ====
On December 5, 1982, the body of a female toddler was seen floating in the Escatawpa River beneath a bridge on Interstate 10 in Moss Point, Mississippi. She had reportedly been seen a few days earlier with her mother, then-unidentified Gwendolyn Clemmons, as Clemmons paced the bridge, seemingly distressed. Drivers reported seeing Clemmons' body floating in the river, but when law enforcement conducted a search, they instead found Heinrich, deceased. During subsequent searches, another man was recovered; however, he was found to be unrelated to the case. Clemmons has not been found, and is believed to be deceased.

Othram was contacted by the Jackson County Sheriff's Office in 2019 to create a genetic profile for genetic genealogy. After the profile was developed, the Sheriff's Office and FBI worked together and were able to identify Heinrich in September 2020. On December 4, 2020, it was announced that "Delta Dawn" had been identified as Alisha Ann Heinrich, last seen with her mother in Kansas City, Missouri.

==== Vance Rodriguez AKA "Mostly Harmless" ====
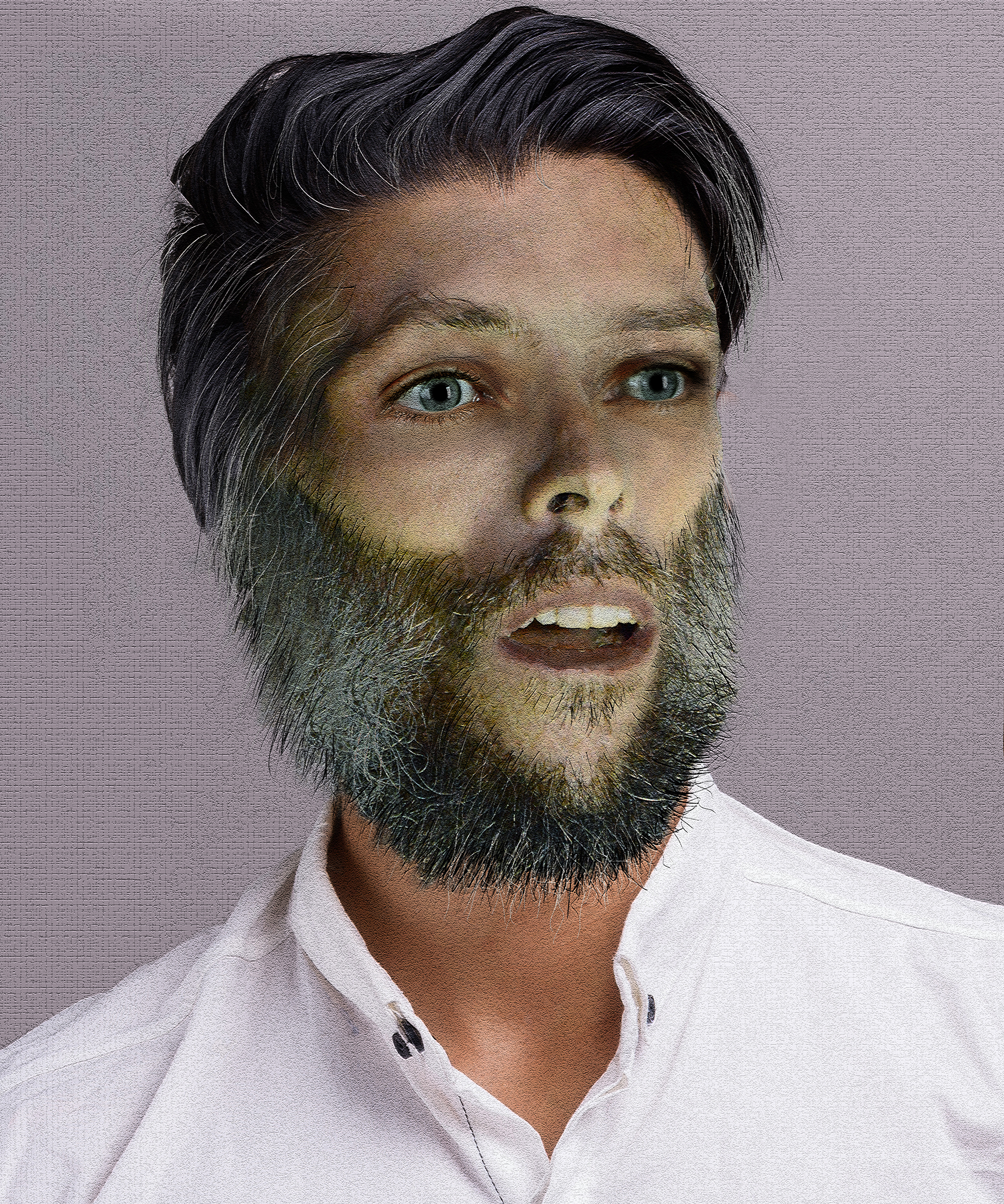
Reconstruction of Vance Rodriguez

On July 23, 2018, a hiker was found dead in his tent near the Appalachian Trail in Big Cypress National Preserve in Florida; he appeared to have starved to death. He was estimated to be between 35 and 60 years old, was 5 feet 8 inches (1.73 m) tall and weighed 83 pounds (38 kg). He had graying dark brown hair, an unkempt gray and brown beard, and blue eyes. He also appeared to have a faint scar across his abdomen. Rodriguez was found wearing a beige shirt with neon green and gray accents, gray "Russel" brand shorts, "Performance" brand underwear, and a Columbia baseball cap. He was also found with various camping and hiking items. He had been seen alive various times previously, and went by the names "Mostly Harmless", "Ben Bilemy", and "Denim" to those he met, possibly referencing Douglas Adams' Hitchhiker's Guide to the Galaxy.

Othram Inc. was contacted in July 2020 to help identify "Mostly Harmless". On January 12, 2021, it was announced that "Mostly Harmless" had been identified as Vance John Rodriguez of Lafayette Parish, Louisiana, who had moved to Brooklyn, New York, after he was recognized by a former co-worker after seeing a flyer.

==== Evelyn Colon AKA "Beth Doe" ====
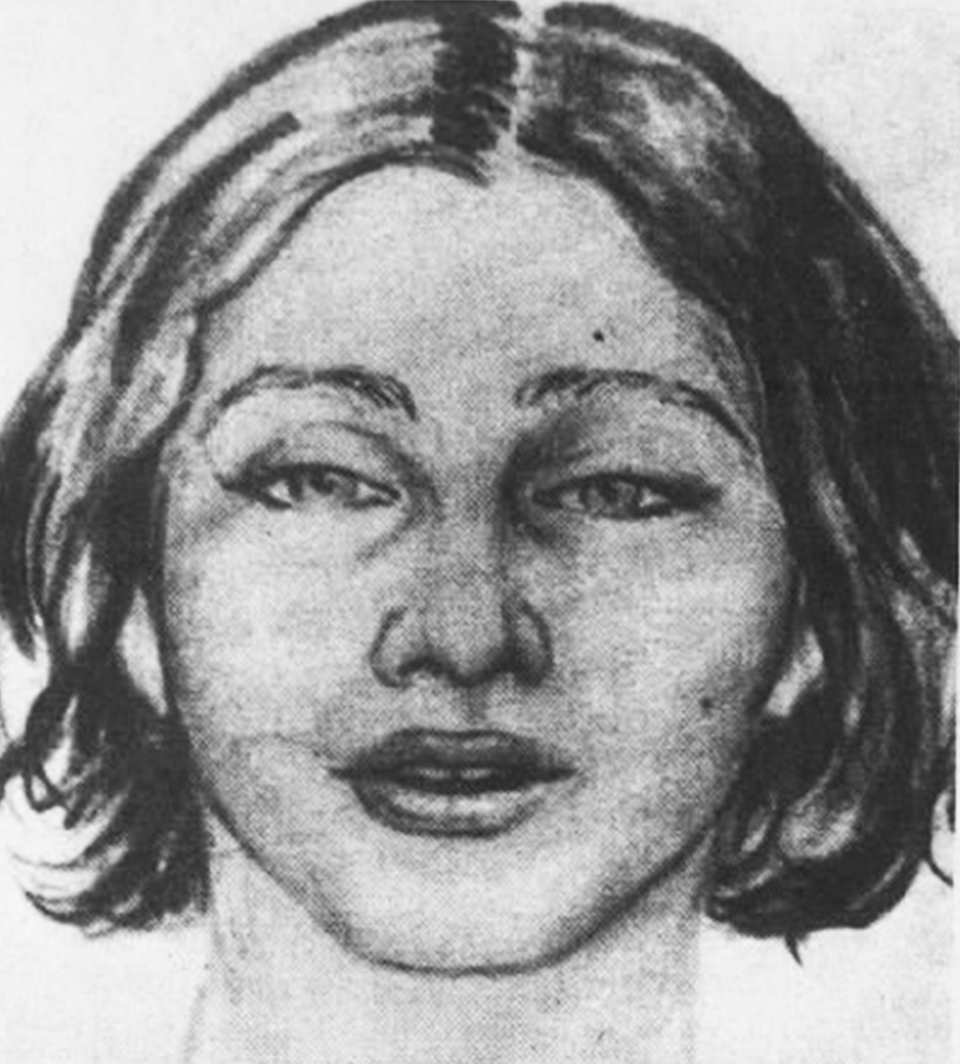
Original sketch of Evelyn Colon

On December 20, 1976, the dismembered body of a young white or Hispanic female was found in multiple suitcases beneath a highway bridge in White Haven, Pennsylvania. Investigators were unable to identify her and she was buried under the name "Beth Doe". After 44 years, investigators finally got a break in the case in 2020 when they compared her DNA to genealogy databases and identified Luis Colon Jr. as a relative of the deceased. Colon Jr. and his family told investigators that Colon Jr.'s aunt, Evelyn Colon, disappeared from Jersey City, New Jersey, at the age of 15 in December 1976 and that she was pregnant and in an abusive relationship at the time she disappeared.

In 2020, the Pennsylvania State Police and the NCMEC contacted Othram to sequence an extraction of DNA in order for them to use forensic genealogy. On March 31, 2021, investigators publicly announced that Beth Doe had been identified as Evelyn Colon. Luis Sierra, Colon's boyfriend and the father of her child, was arrested for her murder.

==== Janet Lucas AKA "Christy Crystal Creek" ====
External image
- Photo of Janet Lucas with 3D Reconstruction

On September 9, 1985, the skeleton of a young woman, nicknamed "Christy Crystal Creek", was found in Missoula, Montana with two .32 caliber bullets in her skull. No clothing was located at the crime scene. Investigators believed this individual may have died sometime between 1983 and early 1985. She stood between 4 feet 10 inches and 5 feet 2 inches (1.47–1.57 m), weighing between 90 and 110 pounds (41–50 kg). Examination indicated that she had a history of smoking and had many fillings as well as two root canals. She also had a type of oral surgery which is distinct to Asia's dental techniques, involving the screwing of a dental post into the tooth. Along with other physical characteristics, it was previously thought she was possibly of Asian descent. It is possible that serial killer and rapist Wayne Nance was responsible for her murder; due to his death in 1986, he was never tried or convicted of any murder. Two other victims believed to have been killed by Nance are "Debbie Deer Creek" and "Betty Beavertail", later identified as Marcella Bachmann and Devonna Nelson, respectively. He also may have committed the murders of two others prior to the Jane Doe discoveries.

Lucas was identified in May 2021 with assistance from Othram. She was last seen in Idaho in 1983 and was originally from Spokane, Washington.

==== Gordon "Gordie" Sanderson AKA "Septic Tank Sam" ====
On April 13, 1977, the decomposing remains of a young to middle aged Native American or white man were found by residents searching a 1.8 meter-deep septic tank in Tofield, Alberta. He had been shot several times and had been sexually mutilated and tortured beforehand, including being burned with a blowtorch and cigarette lighters. Investigators think that the killer must have been familiar with the area, due to the property being derelict and in a very rural location. He was estimated to be between 26 and 50 years old, was 168 cm tall and weighed 70 kilograms. He had brown hair and notable recent dental work. He was found wearing a Levi work shirt with snap buttons, a gray T-shirt, a pair of jeans, a pair of gray wool socks and a pair of brown imitation 'Wallabee' shoes.

Othram was contacted by the Alberta RCMP and Office of the Chief Medical Examiner in 2020 to develop new leads on his identity or killer. With the new genetic profile, "Septic Tank Sam" was identified in June 2021 as Gordon "Gordie" Edwin Sanderson of Edmonton, Alberta.

==== Margaret Fetterolf AKA "Woodlawn Jane Doe" ====
On September 12, 1976, the body of a young woman was found partially wrapped in a white sheet near a cemetery in Woodlawn, Baltimore County, Maryland. She had been beaten, strangled, and raped. The rape had caused bleeding that had seeped into her clothing. Investigators speculated that she was murdered at a different location and then left at the scene at which she was found. It was estimated that she was between 15 and 30 years old, 149 and 159 pounds, and 5 feet 6 to 5 feet 9 inches tall. She was found wearing a white and tan shirt, a white bra, and knee-high socks with multi-colored stripes.

Othram was contacted by BODE Technology and Baltimore County Police in February 2021 to produce a comprehensive genealogical profile from DNA extracted from the victim. On September 15, 2021, it was announced that she had been identified as 16-year-old Margaret Fetterolf of Alexandria, Virginia.

==== Clara Birdlong AKA "Escatawpa Jane Doe" ====
On December 27, 1977, skeletal human remains were found in Escatawpa, Mississippi. The victim was determined to be an African American woman with a front gold tooth. She possibly wore a wig. It is estimated that the woman might have died 3 to 4 months before she was found.

In 2018, serial killer Samuel Little confessed to numerous murders, including the murder of Escatawpa Jane Doe. Little said he murdered a woman that he met at a bar in Gulfport and that she was possibly from the Pascagoula area. Investigators confirmed that he was arrested in Pascagoula in August 1977 during the time period the victim was estimated to have died. He died in prison in December 2020.

The Jackson County Sheriff's Office, in cooperation with the Mississippi State Crime Lab, reached out to Othram to use advanced DNA testing to identify the victim. On September 21, 2021, it was announced that she had been identified as 44-year-old Clara Birdlong from Leflore County, Mississippi.

==== George Seitz AKA "Queens John Doe" ====
On March 12, 2019, the dismembered partial remains of a man were discovered in the backyard of a home in Queens, New York City, after a woman contacted police and informed them that she had seen her stepfather burying a body when she was a child in the 1970s. However, she did not know the identity of the victim.

Othram partnered with the Queens District Attorney's Office and the NYC FBI to identify the victim. On November 3, 2021, it was announced that he had been identified as 81-year-old George Clarence Seitz, who disappeared after leaving his home to get a haircut on December 10, 1976. Seitz was a World War I veteran. Martin Motta was arrested and indicted by a grand jury for the murder.

==== Sherri Jarvis AKA "Walker County Jane Doe" ====
On November 1, 1980, the body of a teenage girl was found along Interstate 45 near Huntsville, Texas, having been beaten severely and strangled. 14-year-old Sherri Ann Jarvis had been in the custody of the state of Minnesota, after excessive truancy from school, until she ran away and disappeared at age 14. It is not known how she made her way to Texas, but three witnesses in the area described her as saying she wanted to go to the now-defunct Ellis Prison Farm to see a "friend". The connection Sherri may have had to the Ellis Prison Farm has never been discovered.

She was publicly identified on November 9, 2021, with assistance from Othram, Inc. The company had begun work on the case during the summer of 2020, finding a potential match in March 2021. Further investigation led to the victim's positive identification.

==== Sharon Lee Gallegos AKA "Little Miss Nobody" ====
The partially buried body of a female child was found in Sand Wash Creek Bed on Old Alamo Road in Congress, Arizona on July 31, 1960. Her cause of death was never determined by medical examiners, but her case was officially declared to be a homicide. She became known as "Little Miss Nobody" after no family or friends came forward to either report her missing or to claim her body. In March 2022, local authorities, with the help of Othram, announced her identity. Gallegos was last seen on 21 July 1960, when she was abducted as she was in an alley behind her home.

==== Joyce Marilyn Meyer Sommers AKA "Christmas Tree Lady" ====
In December 1996, a groundskeeper at Pleasant Valley Memorial Park Cemetery in Annandale, Virginia, found a woman's body. She was found in a section designated for infant burials, but wasn't near a particular grave. The woman was estimated to be a white female with red or copper hair between the ages of 50–70 years old and was approximately 5 feet tall. The woman was found with a plastic bag over her head, along with two fifty dollar bills, one for the coroner and one for the cemetery. A note was found with her body that stated: "Deceased by own hand...prefer no autopsy. Please order cremation with funds provided. Thank you. Jane Doe". The woman's autopsy report showed that she had alcohol and valium in her system when she died. Investigators suspected that the woman committed suicide and the official cause of death was determined to be suffocation. She was given the name of "Christmas Tree Lady" because of a small 8 inch Christmas tree that was found next to her.

Over the years, numerous missing person reports from the National Capital Region were compared to the decedent's physical description, but no matches were found. A colorized sketch of the decedent was made in 2000 in hopes that a friend or family member would recognize her, but no leads were produced. In January 2022, detectives of the Fairfax County Police Department sent physical evidence to Othram where its scientists created a genealogical profile for the decedent. In May 2022, investigative leads were returned to the detectives who used them to find a suspected family member which led to more family connections across the country. A DNA sample from a close relative confirmed a match eventually leading to the decedent's siblings.

On July 7, 2022, the "Christmas Tree Lady" was formally identified as 69-year-old Joyce Marilyn Meyer Sommers. Meyer was born in July 1927, the eldest of 5 siblings and was raised on a farm outside of Davenport, Iowa. Family members believe she moved to Virginia sometime after the mid-1980's. Meyer wasn't reported missing at the time of her death, but family members spent years looking for her and even hired a private detective at one point. It was determined that Meyer never had children.

==== Tracy Walker AKA "Elk Valley Jane Doe/Baby Girl" ====
On April 3, 1985, the skeletonised partial remains of a young girl were discovered about 200 yards off Big Wheel Gap Road, four miles southwest of Jellico, Tennessee, in Campbell County near a strip mine. She was believed to have been dead between one and four years. Her age was estimated between 9 and 15. She was found by a passerby.

On August 30, 2022, she was identified as 15-year-old Tracy Sue Walker of Lafayette, Indiana. The connection was made after Othram Laboratories located a possible family member in the Lafayette area and TBI intelligence analysts located several relatives there, who confirmed they had a relative who disappeared in 1978. DNA samples were taken and submitted to CODIS, from with the UNTCHI identified Walker's remains.

==== Ruth Marie Terry AKA "Lady of the Dunes" ====
In 1974, the decomposing body of a woman was found in Massachusetts. The victim's hands were missing, and her head was nearly severed from her body. She became known as "Lady of the Dunes".

In 2022, skeletal remains were sent to Othram. Despite DNA damage from formaldehyde and other chemicals, a comprehensive DNA profile was built using Forensic-Grade Genome Sequencing®, which was returned to FBI investigators. After discovering a close relative, the FBI were able to confirm that Lady of the Dunes was Ruth Marie Terry. In August 2023, authorities announced that her husband, Guy Muldavin, had killed her, and have now closed the case.

==== Amore Wiggins AKA "Opelika Jane Doe" ====
On January 28, 2012, the skull of a young girl was found in a trailer park in Opelika, Alabama, with additional bones and clothing being found in an adjacent lot. Analysis of the remains determined that they belonged to a young black girl who had likely been malnourished and physically abused while still alive.

On January 19, 2023, Othram identified the decedent as 6-year-old Amore Joveah Wiggins, the daughter of Navy officer Lamar Vickerstaff Jr. and Sherry Wiggins. According to Wiggins, Vickerstaff obtained legal custody of their daughter in 2009 and moved in with his current wife, Ruth, and she never heard from her daughter again. Both of the Vickerstaffs were arrested after the identification, with Lamar facing felony murder charges while Ruth is facing failure to report a missing child.

==== Kerry Cummings AKA "Torso Girl" ====
On October 26, 1997, a human torso was found by a duck hunter in a slough near Eureka, California. Additional remains linked to this victim were located the following year as well. In November 1998, serial killer Wayne Adam Ford confessed to murdering this woman and three others, for which he was tried, convicted and sentenced to death. Despite his confession, this victim's identity remained a mystery.

With the help of a DNA profile and forensic genealogy, Othram managed to identify "Torso Girl" as 25-year-old Kerry Ann Cummings, a woman from Eugene, Oregon, who was known to suffer from an unspecified mental illness and often couch surfed.

==== Ronald Eugene Woodham IV AKA "Baby Boy Horry" ====
In 2008, a newborn baby boy was found in Conway, South Carolina. With few leads to work from, neither the infant nor his parents could be identified.

In 2019, forensic evidence was submitted to Othram, Othram produced investigative leads that were returned to law enforcement investigators. Aided by these leads, law enforcement was able to identify both of the parents as well as the child. His mother was arrested and charged with child abuse homicide, and later accepted a plea deal for manslaughter and was sentenced to 4 years in prison.

The infant was posthumously named Ronald Eugene Woodham IV by his father.

==== Karen Vergata AKA "Fire Island Jane Doe" ====
On April 20, 1996, a pair of legs were found in a plastic bag that had washed ashore in Davis Park, New York. On April 11, 2011, a skull was found west of Tobay Beach near a set of dismembered remains - the skull was later matched to the legs found back in 1996, and this victim was nicknamed "Fire Island Jane Doe". Due to the way in which they were murdered, investigators believed the remains belonged to potential victims of a serial killer dubbed the "Long Island Serial Killer", or simply LISK.

On August 4, 2023, Othram identified the decedent as 34-year-old Karen Vergata, a resident of Manhattan and possible escort who went missing on February 14, 1996. A man named Rex Heuermann has been charged with four of the cases linked to the LISK, but so far has not been publicly named a suspect in this case.

==== Suzanne Kjellenberg AKA "Suzanne Jane Doe" ====
On September 15, 1994, the skeletal remains of a female were found in Holt, Florida, with indications that she had likely been murdered. Serial killer Keith Hunter Jesperson confessed to her murder, claiming that she introduced herself as simply "Suzanne" and that he had met her at a truck stop in Tampa.

In October 2023, Othram identified the decedent as 34-year-old Suzanne L. Kjellenberg of Wisconsin. Investigators have indicated that they would file charges against Jesperson in this case.

==== Kenyatta Odom AKA "Christmas/Waycross Jane Doe" ====
Four days before 1988's Christmas, a truck driver found a human child's remains in a TV cabinet while searching for furniture. She was determined to be African American and speculated to around 3 or 4 years old. In 2020, DNA was submitted to Othram. DNA and isotope forensics revealed that she was likely from Albany, Georgia.

About three years later, someone recognized her facial reconstruction and submitted a tip. Once GBI interviewed and tested her potential family, they can conclusively unearthed her name as Kenyatta Odom. Her mother and her boyfriend at the time of the girl's death were arrested.

==== Ruth Waymire AKA "Millie Doe" ====
On June 20, 1984, two fishermen fishing near the Spokane River found the dismembered remains of a woman. Her hands and feet had been removed, and she had been decapitated. Her skull was found more than a decade later in April 1998, but this failed to bring new clues to her identity.

The case was revisited by investigators over the years, and Othram eventually managed to find a familial match with sisters living in the Midwest. Through them, the decedent was identified as 24-year-old Ruth Belle Waymire, a Spokane resident who lost contact with her family in 1984. Her second husband, Trampas D.L. Vaughn, who had served prison time in Iowa, is currently the only publicly identified suspect. He cannot be questioned, as he died in Sacramento, California in 2017. Investigators are searching for any information on Waymire, her husband and children.

== See also ==
- DNA Doe Project
- Parabon NanoLabs
