= Bear Brook (podcast) =

American true crime podcast

- Genre: True crime
- Language: English

Cast and voices
- Hosted by: Jason Moon

Production
- Production: Taylor Quimby
- Length: Variable

Technical specifications
- Audio format: Podcast (via streaming or downloadable MP3)

Publication
- No. of seasons: 2
- No. of episodes: 20
- Provider: New Hampshire Public Radio
- Updates: Weekly

Related
- Website: www.bearbrookpodcast.com

Bear Brook is an American true crime podcast covering crimes in New Hampshire. The podcast is hosted by Jason Moon and was released through New Hampshire Public Radio.

The first season focused on the Bear Brook murders. The second season covers the case of Jason Carroll.

== Background ==
=== Season 1 ===
In 1985, two bodies were found in a blue barrel in the woods of Allenstown, New Hampshire, in Bear Brook State Park. In 2000, a second barrel was found containing two more bodies. It was determined that the bodies were those of a woman and three young girls. In 2015, Jason Moon began reporting on the murders after it was announced that authorities were using new forensic techniques to try to identify the bodies. Moon wrote a six and a half minute script for a news report on the murders, which later expanded into episodes one through three of the podcast at the suggestion of digital director Rebecca Lavoie.

In 2017, Moon and the editorial team for New Hampshire Public Radio began turning his reporting work into the podcast. In June 2018, Moon began working full-time on Bear Brook. The podcast quickly became one of New Hampshire Public Radio's biggest projects. The podcast could not secure paid advertisers to support it, so as episodes were released, listeners who donated to the radio station were given early access to upcoming episodes. The station received more than $38,000 in donations.

Eventually, the murderer was revealed to be Terry Peder Rasmussen. Rebekah Heath, a librarian and researcher who helped to solve the murders, first heard about the murders on the podcast. The initial breakthrough in the case took 10,000 hours of work. The case was eventually solved by two women at almost the same time, and the results are covered throughout the podcast episodes. The podcast is significant because it explains the genealogy and genetic techniques used to solve the Bear Brook, marking the first time these techniques were used to solve a cold case. The genealogy technique was later used to solve the murders of the Golden State Killer. Bear Brook is credited with helping to solve the crime, as well as contributing to collaborative podcasting community participation.

In May 2019, Moon and Quimby went on an East Coast tour, visiting Washington, D.C., Baltimore, New Jersey, Brooklyn, and Boston.

On March 20, 2020, 20/20 on ABC News hosted a two-hour special on the podcast featuring host Jason Moon. The program was a cooperative project with New Hampshire Public Radio.

=== Season 2 ===
In July 1988, Sharon Johnson, who was seven months pregnant, went missing in Bedford, New Hampshire. Her body was discovered at a construction site. She had been strangled and stabbed. Police later found her vehicle at a mall parking lot. Police focused on Sharon's husband Ken and his coworkers, Anthony Pfaff and Jason Carroll. Pfaaf and Carroll eventually confessed to assisting Johnson with the murder.

All three were charged with capital murder, but a court ruled the state's death penalty unconstitutional. Pfaaf was acquitted, and Johnson's charges were dropped. Carroll was convicted in 1992. He appealed his conviction, arguing his confession had been involuntary. Carroll's mother, a police officer, had been present in the room during his interrogation. The New Hampshire Supreme Court upheld his conviction in 1994.

Season six of the Undisclosed podcast brought Carroll's case to light. After the podcast, Carroll hired the New England Innocence Project to challenge his conviction a second time. The project began by filing a motion for his release from prison. A judge rejected the request in November 2022. Season two of Bear Brook was released the following spring.

In 2025, over 35 years after the murder, New Hampshire prosecutors approved DNA testing on case evidence.

== Production ==
The podcast is hosted by Jason Moon and produced by Taylor Quimby. Most of the original music in the podcast is written, composed, and performed by Moon and Quimby.

== Reception ==
The podcast drew international attention to New Hampshire Public Radio. By November 2018, the podcast had been downloaded more than 1.1 million times. After a break in the case, popularity increased, and by March 2020, the podcast had been downloaded more than 12 million times.

== See also ==
- List of American crime podcasts
