= Disappearance of Laureen Rahn =

1980 disappearance of an American teenager

Laureen Ann Rahn
- Born: Laureen Ann Rahn; April 3, 1966; Manchester, New Hampshire, U.S.
- Disappeared: April 26 or April 27, 1980 (aged 14); Manchester, New Hampshire, U.S.
- Status: Missing for 46 years, 6 months and 14 days
- Height: 5 ft 4 in (1.63 m)

Laureen Ann Rahn (April 3, 1966 – disappeared April 26 or April 27, 1980) is an American teenager who vanished under mysterious circumstances from her home in Manchester, New Hampshire. On the night of her disappearance, Rahn was accompanied by a male and female friend at the apartment she shared with her mother, Judith, who was out on a date with her boyfriend.

At some point during the evening, Rahn's male friend left the apartment after hearing voices in the hallway, assuming Rahn's mother was returning home. Her female friend remained at the apartment. Upon Judith's arrival home after midnight, she found that all of the lightbulbs in the apartment building's hallways had been unscrewed, leaving the halls completely dark. In the apartment, Judith saw a figure sleeping in her daughter's bed and assumed it to be her; however, she then discovered it was in fact Rahn's female friend who had slept in the bed. Her friend claimed to have seen Rahn going to sleep on the couch.

In the months after Rahn's disappearance, Judith was billed for numerous phone calls from an unidentified caller, which were placed from motels in Santa Ana and Santa Monica, California. Karole Jensen, an investigator from the association Wings for Children, uncovered that one of these motels had been suspected of hosting the production of child pornography, but it was never confirmed that Rahn had been at either motel. Rahn's mother continued to receive anonymous calls in the ensuing years before eventually changing her phone number. In 1992, Laureen was declared legally dead by her mother after acknowledging that her daughter was likely never coming home. Regardless, Laureen's case remains open and is still being investigated.

== Biography ==
Laureen Rahn was born on April 3, 1966, in Manchester, New Hampshire. Her parents divorced when she was an infant, and she was primarily brought up by her mother, Judith Rahn (née Swanson). When Laureen was four, she and Judith moved to Miami, Florida, but six years later, they returned to Manchester. By 1980, they resided in a third-floor apartment on Merrimack Street.

Laureen was a student at Parkside Junior High School. She was described as a happy, outgoing girl and a good student who got along with her mother. She loved to sing and dance, and she dreamed of being an actress. However, Laureen was said to be "troubled." She spent much of her time alone on the streets, had talked about running away, and had begun to smoke marijuana and drink alcohol. Her aunt, Diane Pinault, described her as "an angel who hung around with the wrong people for a while."

== Disappearance ==
Locations
1 Rahn home.

On April 26, 1980, Laureen Rahn's mother, Judith, went out of town for the day to watch her boyfriend play in a tennis match. Laureen decided to stay home alone in the apartment. Rahn, who was on spring break at the time, usually attended the matches with her mother, but she had asked to stay home this time. She spent the day around the neighborhood and at a convenience store on the block. Several family members had stopped by the apartment during the day. In the evening, she invited one male and one female friend over, and the three drank a six-pack of beer and a bottle of wine together. Rahn's friends would later say they had seen her restocking wine coolers at the convenience store during the day, possibly in exchange for the alcohol. Around 12:30 a.m. on April 27, Laureen was sitting with her male friend in the living room when they heard voices in the apartment building's hallways. He exited the apartment through a back door, assuming that Rahn's mother was returning home and that he and Laureen would get in trouble if he was found there. The male friend later stated that he heard Rahn lock the door behind him as he left. Another neighbor confirmed having heard voices approaching the apartment around that time.

Sometime around 1:15 a.m. on April 27, Judith arrived home accompanied by her boyfriend and noticed that the light bulbs on all three of the apartment building's floors had been unscrewed, leaving the hallways completely dark. When she arrived at her apartment's front door, she found it unlocked. Judith initially looked into her daughter's darkened bedroom, saw the bed was occupied, and assumed it was Laureen. Her boyfriend then noticed the back door was open. Judith went to wake Laureen to ask why, but realized as she approached the bed that it was not her daughter at all, but a friend. Laureen's friend claimed that Laureen had been in bed with her but had taken her pillow and blanket to sleep on the couch in the living room. The girl would later state that she was unable to recall any of that night due to her inebriation. Upon further examination of the apartment, Judith found Laureen's purse and her brand new sneakers, a birthday gift, in the living room. None of Laureen's possessions, including her money or clothing, were missing, nor were there signs of a struggle in the apartment.

Judith called family members to see if Laureen was with them, and she and her boyfriend went out to search the neighborhood. Around 3:45 a.m., Judith spotted a police car, which she flagged down to report her daughter missing. For several weeks, police believed that Rahn had run away; however, when she did not return, they began to modify their theory. They instead believed that she had left the apartment intending to come back, and something had happened. A bus company employee told police he had sold a ticket to a girl matching Rahn's description the day she disappeared, and a driver from the company identified Rahn from an old photograph as a girl he had dropped off in Park Square, Boston. Weeks later, police obtained a more recent photograph and interviewed him again; the driver said he was no longer sure that the girl he had dropped off was Rahn.

== Subsequent events ==
=== Related cases ===
One month before Rahn's disappearance, 15-year-old Rachael Garden went missing after she purchased a pack of cigarettes and chewing gum at Rowe's Corner Market on Route 108 in Newton, New Hampshire on March 22, 1980. She has not been seen since. Even though there is no evidence linking the two cases, Rahn was a brunette about Garden's age who vanished from a nearby town. Law enforcement, however, continues to be insistent that the two cases are unrelated.

Rahn's case has also been tentatively linked to the disappearance of 15-year-old Shirley McBride who was last seen leaving her half-sister's apartment on Union Street in Concord, New Hampshire at 9:30 p.m. on July 13, 1984. She has not been seen or heard from since. Her parents declared her legally dead twelve years after she disappeared.

Six weeks after Rahn's disappearance, Denise Daneault, a 25-year-old woman who lived two blocks from the Rahn residence, went missing from a bar in Manchester. Decades later, police named Terry Peder Rasmussen, a serial killer living in the area under the pseudonym "Bob Evans", as a suspect. Rasmussen later pleaded guilty to murdering his wife in California in 2003, and died in 2010. Rasmussen lived a mile and a half away from where Rahn disappeared and both she and Daneault reportedly closely resembled each other in spite of the difference in their ages.

Authorities believe Rasmussen may have been involved in as many as six more murders and/or disappearances, including that of Denise Beaudin, who vanished in Goffstown in 1981 and was never found, as well as the Bear Brook murders, which refers to four female murder victims found in the Bear Brook State Park between 1985 and 2000. One of the victims was Rasmussen's biological daughter. Rasmussen was also linked to the death of Elizabeth Lamotte, 17, who disappeared from Manchester, New Hampshire on April 6, 1984. She was last seen at a youth development centre and her naked body was found southbound at the Jearoldstown, Tennessee exit on Interstate 81. She had been beaten and stabbed and the medical examiner determined she had died from a blow to the head. Her body was identified in November 2018.

=== Phone calls ===
External image
- Age progression of Rahn to age 55

On October 1, 1980, Judith found she had been charged for three phone calls placed in California; she did not have friends or relatives there, and Rahn had never had any ties to the area. Two calls were placed from a motel in Santa Monica, and another from a motel in Santa Ana, the latter of which was made to a hotline for teens seeking sexual assistance. Detectives spoke with the physician who maintained the hotline, and he initially denied having known anything of the call.

Five years later, in 1985, Karole Jensen, an investigator from the organization Wings for Children, called the physician, and he changed his story; he claimed that numerous young women and runaways occasionally visited his wife at their home and that one of the girls may have been Rahn. He also stated that Annie Sprinkle, a sex educator and former pornographic actress who allegedly knew his wife, might have had information regarding Rahn's disappearance and those of other runaway girls. However, both investigators from Wings for Children and the National Center for Missing and Exploited Children were unable to find any evidence linking Sprinkle to Rahn's disappearance.

Throughout 1981, Judith claimed to have received numerous mysterious phone calls from an unknown individual, which she always received at approximately 3:45 a.m. During these calls, Judith claimed the caller never spoke. The phone calls continued for several years after Rahn's disappearance, increasing in frequency during the Christmas holiday. The calls eventually stopped after she changed her phone number several years after Rahn's disappearance. Rahn's aunt Janet Roy also reported that on several occasions after her disappearance, a young girl called the Roy family's telephone asking to speak to Roy's son, Michael. Whenever Michael picked up the phone, the caller was silent. Roy believed the caller may have been Rahn as she would refer to Michael as "Mike", a nickname only Rahn used for her cousin.

Jensen visited California in 1986. She located the motels from which the October 1980 phone calls had been placed. She discovered that one of the motels may have been used as a filming location by a child pornographer known as "Dr. Z"; however, Jensen was unable to link Dr. Z to the hotline. The same year, a childhood friend of Rahn's named Roger Maurais received a phone call from a woman who claimed to be "Laurie" or Laureen. Maurais's mother answered the phone call and stated that the woman claimed to have been her son's former girlfriend. Maurais had dated Rahn when the two were about 12 years old.

==== Alleged sightings ====
In 1981, after the receipt of the October 1980 phone calls, a close friend of Rahn's aunt Jobeth Swanson claimed to have seen her at a bus terminal in Boston; this sighting remains unconfirmed. Another unconfirmed sighting occurred in 1988, when a witness claimed to have seen a sex worker in Anchorage, Alaska, who matched Rahn's description.

== Later developments ==
In the late 1980s, Rahn's mother remarried and relocated to Florida. She has stated that she believes her daughter placed the phone calls from California in October 1980. The unnamed male friend who was drinking alcohol with Rahn the night she disappeared took his own life in 1985, though law enforcement never considered him a suspect in her disappearance. Investigators assigned to Rahn's case have stated they believe foul play is involved.

== See also ==
- List of people who disappeared
