= Terry Peder Rasmussen =

American serial killer (1943–2010)

Terry Rasmussen
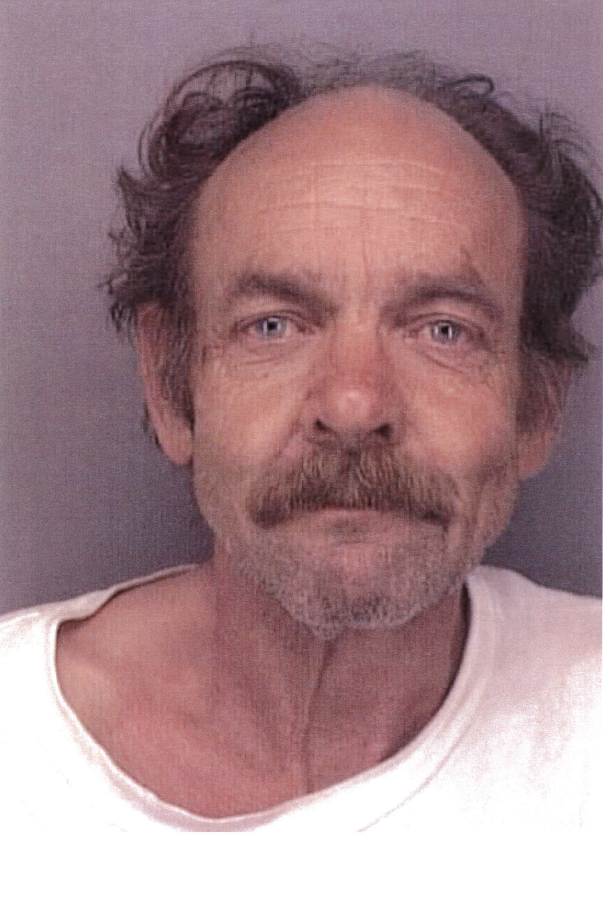
- Rasmussen's 2002 mugshot
- Born: December 23, 1943; Denver, Colorado, U.S.
- Died: December 28, 2010 (aged 67); High Desert State Prison, Susanville, California, U.S.
- Other names: Robert "Bob" Evans; Curtis Mayo Kimball; Gordon Jensen; Lawrence "Larry" William Vanner; Gerald "Gerry" Mockerman; The Barrell Killer
- Children: 5, including Rea
- Criminal charges: Murder
- Penalty: 15 years to life

Details
- Victims: One conviction, 6+ more suspected
- Span of crimes: c. 1978–2002
- Country: United States
- States: New Hampshire; California
- Date apprehended: 2002

Terry Peder Rasmussen (December 23, 1943 – December 28, 2010) was an American convicted murderer and serial killer who was convicted of one murder, and linked to at least six more in a series of crimes that stretched across the contiguous United States between 1978 and 2002. Due to his use of many aliases, most notably "Bob Evans", Rasmussen is known as the Chameleon Killer.

Rasmussen is the prime suspect in the Bear Brook murders, which took place in New Hampshire sometime between 1978 and 1980. During this period, he was in a relationship with Marlyse Honeychurch. The bodies of Honeychurch, her two daughters, and his own daughter were discovered in two barrels in the Allenstown area between 1985 and 2000. Although the Allenstown barrels were discovered during his lifetime, Rasmussen was not linked until 2017, when DNA profiling connected him to the crime. Subsequent investigations led to three of the Bear Brook victims being identified in 2019; the identity of the fourth victim, Rasmussen's daughter, was confirmed in 2025 as Rea Rasmussen. Rea's mother, Pepper Reed, disappeared from California in the late 1970s and is also suspected to be a victim of Rasmussen.

Rasmussen left New Hampshire in 1981 with girlfriend Denise Beaudin, who subsequently disappeared and is presumed dead. He abducted Beaudin's daughter and took her to California, later abandoning her in 1986, for which he was imprisoned on child abandonment charges. Following his parole in 1990, he absconded and remained a fugitive for more than a decade. In 2002, Rasmussen murdered another girlfriend, Eunsoon Jun; he was convicted of her murder and sentenced to 15 years to life imprisonment. He died in prison in 2010.

== Early life ==
Terry Peder Rasmussen was born on December 23, 1943, in Denver, Colorado to Peder Rasmussen, the son of Danish immigrants, and Anita Berwick, a 7th-generation descendant of an English immigrant. Growing up in Arizona, he attended North High School in Phoenix until dropping out during his sophomore year in 1960. He enlisted in the United States Navy in 1961, where he was trained as an electrician, and served until he was discharged in 1967.

Rasmussen married in 1968 and lived with his wife and four children in Phoenix and Redwood City, California. His family later recalled that he was physically abusive, burning one of his sons with cigarette butts. Rasmussen's wife left him and took the children in 1975 after he was arrested for aggravated assault. The family last saw Rasmussen around December 1975 or 1976, when he showed up at their home with an unidentified woman. The divorce was finalized in 1978.

Rasmussen lived in a number of states including Arizona, Colorado, California, Idaho, Virginia, Texas, Ohio, Oregon and Hawaii, finally settling in New Hampshire sometime in the late 1970s. It was reported that he was known to travel with women and children. He often worked as an electrician for oil and gas companies. While living in Manchester, New Hampshire, Rasmussen lived under the alias "Bob Evans" and worked at the Waumbec Mill. He was arrested three times in 1980 for writing a bad check, theft, and diverting electric current. A woman named "Elizabeth Evans" was listed as his wife during his time in New Hampshire; this woman is believed to be Marlyse Elizabeth Honeychurch, the adult Bear Brook victim, but her identity has never been confirmed.

== Crimes ==
=== Pepper Reed and Rea ===
Pepper Reed was last seen by her family in Houston, Texas, during Christmas 1975. Reed was pregnant with Rasmussen's child at the time and her family believed she later moved to California, though they never saw her again. Reed and Rasmussen's daughter, Rea, was born in 1976. Reed subsequently disappeared from public records later in the 1970s and was considered a missing person. Rea Rasmussen was later identified as one of the murder victims found in the second Bear Brook barrel in 2000, with her identification confirmed in 2025. It is believed that she was between the ages of 2 and 4 when she was murdered.

=== Marlyse Honeychurch and her children ===
In 1978, Rasmussen dated Marlyse Honeychurch, who had been married twice and had a daughter from each marriage. Honeychurch was last seen in La Puente, California, on Thanksgiving day of that year. After an argument with her family, Honeychurch left with Rasmussen and her two daughters, six-year-old Marie Elizabeth Vaughn and one-year-old Sarah Lynn McWaters. They were never seen by their family again.

On November 10, 1985, the bodies of Honeychurch and Vaughn were found in a barrel in Bear Brook State Park in Allenstown, New Hampshire. They were found to have died of blunt force trauma to their heads. On May 9, 2000, a second barrel was found about 100 yards from the location of the first, containing the body of McWaters and Rea Rasmussen. Investigators believe all four victims were killed at around the same time, and that the second barrel was already there in 1985 but was overlooked due to its distance from the first. The identities of Honeychurch and her two children were not known until they were confirmed by DNA profiling in 2019.

=== Denise Beaudin and Lisa ===
While using the pseudonym Bob Evans, Rasmussen dated Denise Beaudin, who disappeared from Manchester, New Hampshire, after Thanksgiving 1981 with her six-month-old daughter. Authorities believe that Rasmussen killed Beaudin somewhere in California, although her body has never been found. Beaudin was not reported missing at the time as her family believed she left town due to financial reasons.

Throughout the early 1980s, Rasmussen remained in possession of Beaudin's daughter, whom he called Lisa, and posed as her father. He was arrested in Cypress, California, in 1985 under the name "Curtis Kimball" for charges of driving under the influence and endangering the welfare of a child but failed to appear in court. He then took on the alias "Gordon Jenson" and abandoned the child at an RV park in Scotts Valley, California, in 1986. Two years later, Rasmussen was arrested under another alias, "Gerry Mockerman", for driving a stolen vehicle. As Mockerman, his fingerprints linked him back to his Curtis Kimball alias. In 1989, he was arrested and received a three-year prison sentence for child abandonment. An additional charge of child abuse was dropped; this is believed to be the result of a plea bargain. He was paroled in 1990 and absconded almost immediately, becoming a fugitive.

=== Eunsoon Jun ===
Rasmussen resurfaced in December 1999 under the pseudonym "Larry Vanner" when California-based chemist Eunsoon Jun introduced him to her family. The two were married in an unofficial ceremony in 2001. Jun disappeared the following June and her body was found buried in cat litter in their home. She was found to have died from blunt force trauma to the head. Rasmussen was arrested in November 2002 and pleaded no contest in 2003 to charges relating to her murder and dismemberment. He was sentenced to fifteen years to life in prison.

The guilty plea came as a surprise to the court; Contra Costa County homicide detective Roxane Gruenheid believes Rasmussen pleaded guilty after overhearing her say that she was going to request a paternity test for Lisa, hoping the guilty plea would make Gruenheid stop probing into his past. A fingerprint match had confirmed that along with Vanner, he had previously used the aliases Jenson and Kimball, linking him to the child abandonment case. In 2003, the San Bernardino County Sheriff's Department opened a case to find Lisa's biological family. DNA evidence eventually found that Rasmussen was not Lisa's father, and the case spent years without any significant developments.

Rasmussen died on December 28, 2010, aged 67, while imprisoned at High Desert State Prison. His cause of death was a combination of lung cancer, chronic obstructive pulmonary disease and pneumonia.

== Posthumous findings ==
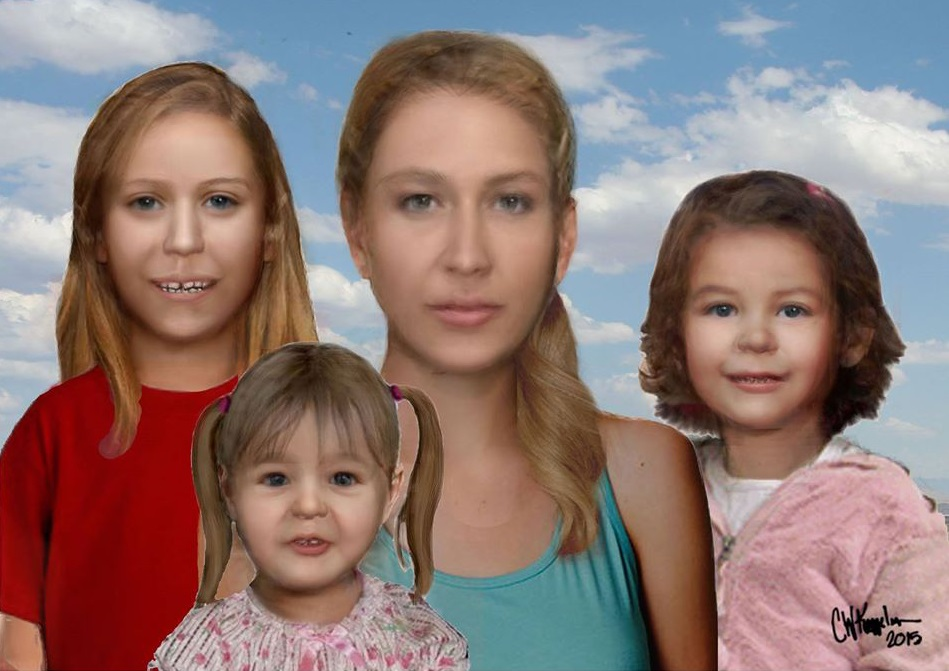
Reconstructions of the four victims found in Allenstown.

San Bernardino detective Peter Headley was assigned to Lisa's case in 2013, by which time genealogy website databases had grown substantially. Aided by genetic genealogist Barbara Rae-Venter in 2015, Beaudin's daughter discovered her mother's identity and that the man she once thought had been her father was her kidnapper. When Beaudin's father was shown a mugshot of "Curtis Kimball", he identified him as Bob Evans. This linked him to New Hampshire in the same timeframe as the Bear Brook murders. On January 26, 2017, authorities publicly announced that "Bob Evans" was a suspect in the disappearance of Beaudin and the Bear Brook murders. Additionally, they announced that DNA confirmed that he was the father of the middle child found in Allenstown but that Evans was a pseudonym and his legal identity was not known.

In June 2017, in hopes of finding his true identity, police released a video of a police interview of Evans from 2002 after his murder of Eunsoon Jun. Two months later, he was confirmed to be Rasmussen through Y-DNA testing from a DNA sample contributed by one of his children from what is believed to be his first marriage. The use of genetic genealogy to identify Rasmussen represented new possibilities in forensic investigations. These techniques have since been used in other high-profile cases, including the capture of serial killer Joseph James DeAngelo in April 2018.

New Hampshire investigators announced that the identities of Honeychurch, Vaughn and McWaters were confirmed through DNA testing in June 2019. The middle child was identified as Rea Rasmussen in September 2025. A California birth certificate and genetic testing identified her mother as Pepper Reed, with both Reed and Rea having gone missing sometime after 1976.

Criminologist Jack Levin has stated that Rasmussen is unlike any serial killer he has ever studied, stating: "What distinguishes Rasmussen from most serial killers, is that he targeted people with whom he had a relationship. Most serial killers would never do that; it's the last thing they would do. Instead, they focus on complete strangers." He has been dubbed the "Chameleon Killer" due to his use of various aliases and his crime spree which stretched across the country.

In 2018, New Hampshire Public Radio covered the Bear Brook murders, as well as other posthumous findings on Rasmussen, on the first season of the true crime podcast Bear Brook.

== Suspect in other crimes ==
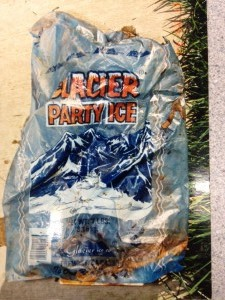
Bag of ice found with the body of Amanda Schumann Deza who was left in a refrigerator in California in 1995

Since Rasmussen's connection to the Bear Brook murders was revealed in 2017, he has been investigated for other crimes. New Hampshire State Police are interested in the gaps of time in which Rasmussen's whereabouts are not known, particularly from 1974 to 1985. Det. Sgt. Christopher Elphick stated that it is "highly unlikely that [Rasmussen] stopped doing what he was doing," commenting that it is "certainly possible" that additional victims will be discovered.

Rasmussen lived a mile and a half away from fourteen-year-old Laureen Rahn when she disappeared from Manchester in April 1980. Denise Daneault, a 25-year-old woman who lived two blocks from the Rahn residence, and on the same street as Rasmussen, went missing from a bar in June 1980. Police and FBI agents conducted a search in Manchester after receiving an anonymous tip regarding Daneault in November 2017, after Rasmussen was announced as the Bear Brook killer. A second search was conducted in May 2018. By 2020, New Hampshire Senior Assistant Attorney General Jeff Strelzin said there was no "evidentiary connection" between Daneault and Rasmussen but that the interest in his case brought renewed attention to Daneault's disappearance.

Elizabeth Lamotte was seventeen years old when she disappeared from the Youth Development Center in Manchester in 1984. She left the group home after receiving a furlough, so she was not reported missing until police were seeking more information on Rasmussen in 2017. At that time, a tipster speculated that she could have been the "Elizabeth Evans" that had been listed as Rasmussen's wife during his time in Manchester. However, DNA from Lamotte's relatives later proved that she was one of the victims in the Redhead murders, a series of unsolved homicides across the U.S. which are unrelated to Rasmussen. Lamotte had been found in Tennessee in 1985, killed about four months after her disappearance.

When Lisa was interviewed by detectives in 1986, they asked her if she had any siblings. She said that she did but "they died eating 'grass mushrooms' when they were out camping". As Rasmussen did not have any known victims during the five years between Beaudin's disappearance and Lisa's abandonment, her answer led police to believe that he may have had more unknown victims.

San Joaquin County Assistant Sheriff John Huber speculated that Rasmussen may have been responsible for killing Amanda Schumann Deza. In 1995, her body was discovered by scavengers inside of a refrigerator which had been dumped in a canal in Holt, California. Like Rasmussen's confirmed victims, she had died of blunt force trauma to the head. Having previously been an unidentified victim, known as the "San Joaquin Jane Doe" and the "Lady in the Fridge", Deza was identified by Othram on February 23, 2023.

== See also ==
- List of serial killers in the United States
- List of serial killers by number of victims
