= Bear Brook (Suncook River tributary) =

- Location within New Hampshire Location within the United States

Location
- Country: United States
- State: New Hampshire
- Counties: Rockingham, Merrimack
- Towns: Candia, Hooksett, Deerfield, Allenstown

Physical characteristics
- Source: Hall Mountain Marsh
  - location: Candia, Rockingham County
  - coordinates: 43°5′50″N 71°21′6″W
  - elevation: 675 ft (206 m)
- Mouth: Suncook River
  - location: Allenstown, Merrimack County
  - coordinates: 43°10′17″N 71°23′41″W
  - elevation: 285 ft (87 m)
- Length: 10.0 mi (16.1 km)

Basin features
- Tributaries
  - left: Catamount Brook
  - right: Pease Brook, Little Bear Brook

Bear Brook is a 10.0-mile-long (16.1 km) stream located in central New Hampshire in the United States. It is a tributary of the Suncook River, part of the Merrimack River (and therefore Gulf of Maine) watershed. Its entire course is within Bear Brook State Park.

Bear Brook begins at the outlet of Hall Mountain Marsh near the four-corner intersection of the towns of Allenstown, Deerfield, Candia, and Hooksett. The brook descends to the north, through Deerfield, then turns west and reenters Allenstown. Nearing Deerfield Road, the brook is impounded by Catamount Pond, with a state park beach and picnic area. The brook flows northwest from the pond and reaches the Suncook River in less than a mile.

== See also ==
- List of rivers of New Hampshire
