= Bear Brook State Park Civilian Conservation Corps Camp Historic District =

Historic district in New Hampshire, United States

- Bear Brook State Park Civilian Conservation Corps (CCC) Camp Historic District
- U.S. National Register of Historic Places
- U.S. Historic district
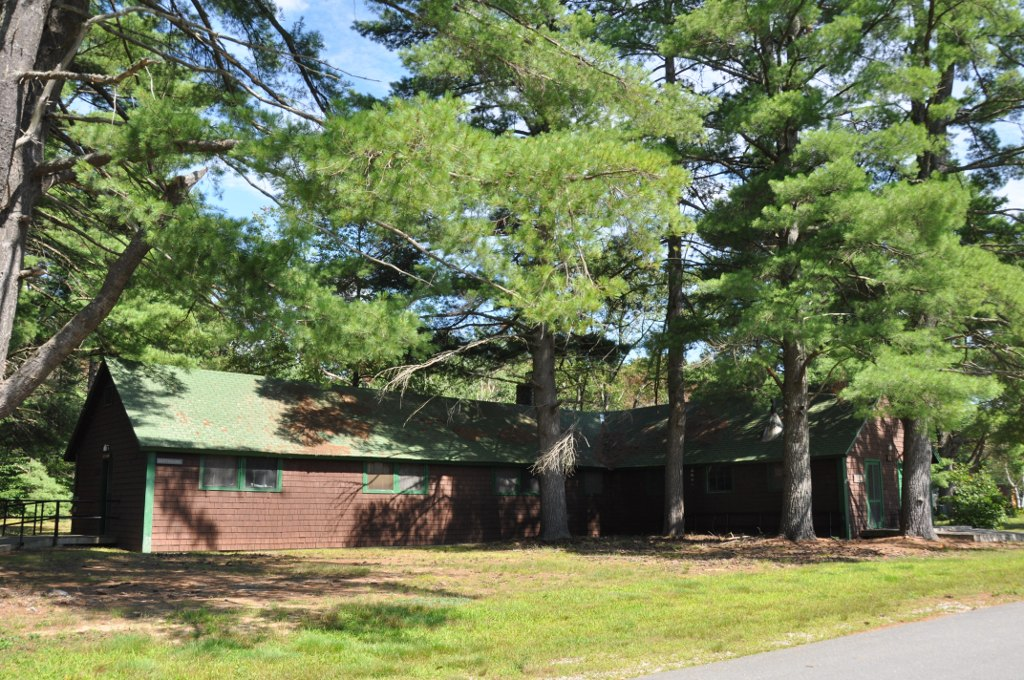

- Location within New Hampshire Location within the United States
- Location: 1/2 mi. from park entrance, 160 yds. S of Allenstown-Deerfield Rd., Bear Brook State Park, Allenstown, New Hampshire
- Coordinates: 43°9′29″N 71°22′44″W
- Area: 2 acres (0.81 ha)
- Built by: Civilian Conservation Corps
- Architect: United States Army
- NRHP reference No.: 92000632
- Added to NRHP: June 11, 1992

The Bear Brook State Park Civilian Conservation Corps (CCC) Camp Historic District is the only surviving Civilian Conservation Corps work camp in New Hampshire. Located in Bear Brook State Park, in Allenstown, the camp's facilities have been adaptively reused to provide space for park administration and a small museum. It is located in the northwestern portion of the park, south of Deerfield Road. It is also believed to be one of the few relatively intact CCC camps in the nation. The district was listed on the National Register of Historic Places in 1992.

== Description and history ==
The United States Forest Service purchased the lands that make up much of Bear Brook State Park in 1935, as part of a jobs plan for acquiring and adapting lands of marginal agricultural value for recreational purposes. The 1123rd Company of the Civilian Conservation Corps was established in those lands in 1935 to undertake the process of building out infrastructure for recreation. The crew was housed in a camp that included thirteen structures, built out of relatively inexpensive materials in a rapid period of time, to standardized designs developed by the United States Army. The buildings were framed in southern pine, with walls and roofs of pine wallboard covered in tarpaper. They were built without foundations, the sills set directly on the ground, as they were intended to be temporary structures.

The camp at Bear Brook operated from 1935 until 1942, when the CCC program was terminated. It was used for one year as a recreational facility for United States Navy personnel on leave from ships docked in nearby coastal harbors, and was then turned over to the state. The camp complex was adapted for use as a maintenance and residence facility for park staff. Buildings were given more durable exteriors (now generally asphalt shingle roofing and wooden shingle siding), and their interiors were altered for these new uses. Of the roughly fifteen buildings erected in the camp, eight survive, as do many of the trees planted in the campground by the CCC, which have matured and provide shade to the area. One of the buildings now houses a small museum devoted to local CCC history. The camp is the only one to survive in any significant form in the state (out of 26 built), and is one of a small number in the nation to retain as many buildings as it has.

== See also ==
- National Register of Historic Places listings in Merrimack County, New Hampshire
- New Hampshire Historical Marker No. 205: Bear Brook CCC Camp 1935–1942
