= Redhead murders =

Unsolved murders in the United States

Lisa Nichols, 28

Tina Farmer, 21

Tracy Walker, 15

Michelle Inman, 23

Espy Pilgrim, 28

Details
- Victims: 5–14+
- Span of crimes: 1978–1992
- States: Tennessee, Arkansas, Mississippi, Pennsylvania, Kentucky, West Virginia
- Date apprehended: Not apprehended

The Redhead murders is the media epithet used to refer to a series of unsolved homicides of redheaded girls and young women in the United States between October 1978 and 1992, believed to have been committed by an unidentified male serial killer. The murders believed to be related have occurred in states including Tennessee, Arkansas, Kentucky, Mississippi, Pennsylvania, and West Virginia. The murders may have continued until 1992. The victims, many remaining unidentified for years, were usually women with reddish hair, whose bodies were abandoned along major highways in the United States. Officials believe that the women were likely hitchhiking or may have engaged in prostitution.

Authorities are unsure how many people were responsible for these murders, if they were all performed by the same perpetrator(s), and how many victims there have been. It is believed that there may have been a total of five to fourteen victims. Of the presumed victims, four were identified by November 2018. The suspect was informally called the "Bible Belt Strangler" in 2018, because the territory where the bodies were found was part of the Bible Belt.

== Victims ==
=== Lisa Nichols ===
On September 16, 1984, the body of a woman later identified as 28-year-old Lisa Nichols, who also used the last name of Jarvis, was found along Interstate 40 near West Memphis, Arkansas. She was wearing only a sweater. She was found to have lived in West Virginia. Authorities were not able to identify and contact her family members for some time, indicating that Nichols was estranged from them. She was not identified until June 1985, nine months after she was murdered. She was identified through fingerprints. She was identified by a couple from Florida, who had allowed her to stay with them for a period of time. Nichols may have been murdered after leaving a truck stop along the highway and may have attempted to hitchhike.

=== Tina Farmer ===
On January 1, 1985, the bound body of a woman was found near Jellico, Tennessee, in Campbell County, down an embankment off the southbound side of Interstate 75. The remains were in an advanced state of decomposition, as she had been killed approximately 72 hours before. The victim, who was strangled to death, was Caucasian, and had shoulder-length curly red hair. Her age was estimated to be between 17 and 25, but possibly as old as 30. The victim was found clothed, in a tan pullover, a shirt, and jeans. Additionally, she had been wrapped in a blanket, which was later found to have seminal fluid on it. The woman had green eyes, freckles, and various scars (including a burn mark on one arm); she was 10 to 12 weeks pregnant when she died. She had a partial upper denture holding two false teeth. It is believed that she was between 5'1" and 5'4" (155–163 cm) in height when she died and was approximately 110 to 115 pounds (50 to 52 kg).

On September 6, 2018, the Shelby County Sheriff's Office announced that the victim had been identified by fingerprint as Tina Marie McKenney Farmer of Indiana. She was 21 at the time of her death and was last seen in Indianapolis, Indiana, accompanied by a trucker said to be headed to Kentucky. Farmer had one daughter prior to disappearing in 1984. She was reported missing by her family at the time, yet authorities in Indiana did not enter her into national databases. The state did not have a law, common to many other states, requiring law enforcement to enter unidentified victims into this database.

In 2019, DNA evidence identified convicted kidnapper Jerry Leon Johns as the man who killed Tina Farmer in December 1984. Johns, who died in prison in 2015, was previously convicted in 1987 of aggravated kidnapping, assault, and other crimes in the attack on a woman, Linda Schacke, who he had picked up in Knox County, Tennessee, two months after Farmer's disappearance and death. Schacke survived the attack, after she was bound, strangled, and dumped along Interstate 40. Her testimony assisted in putting Johns behind bars. Like Farmer, Schacke had been choked with a piece of cloth ripped from her T-shirt, bound, and left for dead inside a storm drain under Interstate 40, near Watt Road. Like Farmer, and the other potential victims of the Redhead Murders, Schacke also had red hair. On December 18, 2019, a grand jury in Campbell County, Tennessee, ruled that Johns would have been indicted for murder in Farmer's death if he were still alive.

=== Tracy Walker ===
2019 reconstruction of Walker by the National Center for Missing and Exploited Children

On April 3, 1985, the skeletonized partial remains of a young girl were discovered about 200 yards off Big Wheel Gap Road, four miles southwest of Jellico, Tennessee in Campbell County near a strip mine. She was believed to have been dead between one and four years. Her age was estimated between 9 and 15. She was found by a passerby.

The cause of death is undetermined, which does not rule out homicide. Thirty-two bones, including her skull, were recovered from the scene. Her skull was complete enough to permit a facial reconstruction attempt. A necklace and bracelet made of plastic buttons were found nearby, as well as a pair of size 5 boots and a few scraps of clothing. These items may or may not have belonged to her. Her hair and eye color were unknown. Her age range was below the median for the other victims, but the circumstances of her death may connect her to them.

Recent forensic analysis of the victim's remains indicated she was not native to the area where she was discovered. The tests showed she was likely born in Florida or central Texas and had later lived in the Midwest, Rocky Mountain states, the Southwest, or the Pacific Coast.

On August 30, 2022, she was identified as 15-year-old Tracy Sue Walker of Lafayette, Indiana. The connection was made after Othram Laboratories located a possible family member in the Lafayette area and TBI intelligence analysts located several relatives there, who confirmed they had a relative who disappeared in 1978. Tracy's mother had twice reported her as running away from their Eisenhower Court home in Lafayette. Tracy was last seen at Tippecanoe Mall with a friend sometime in 1978. DNA samples were taken and submitted to CODIS, from which the UNTCHI identified Walker's remains.

In 2026, the Redhead Murders were the subject of a documentary series, Murder 101, which highlights the efforts of Elizabethton High School students to solve these murders. Alongside the Tennessee Bureau of Investigation, their investigation led to a reinvigoration of the case and the establishment of a website, justice4tracysue.com, showcasing photographs of the crime scene and a call to help find her killer.

=== Michelle Lavone Inman ===
On March 31, 1985, the skeletonized body of a red-haired female was found in Pleasant View, Cheatham County, Tennessee. She was believed to have died between three and five months previously from an unknown cause. However, her case is possibly linked to the redhead murders because her remains were found at the side of Interstate 24, between mile markers 29 and 30.

Unlike some of the other victims, she was wearing clothing: a shirt, sweater, pants and underwear. She was white, between five feet and five feet two inches (157 cm) tall. Her weight could not be determined. An examination of her teeth showed that the victim had some evidence of crowding and overlapping in her mouth. This woman was believed to be between the ages of 31 and 40 at the time of her death. In July 2023 she was identified by the Tennessee Bureau of Identification and Othram, Inc. as 23-year-old Michelle Lavone Inman of Nashville, Tennessee, through forensic genetic genealogy.

=== Espy Pilgrim ===
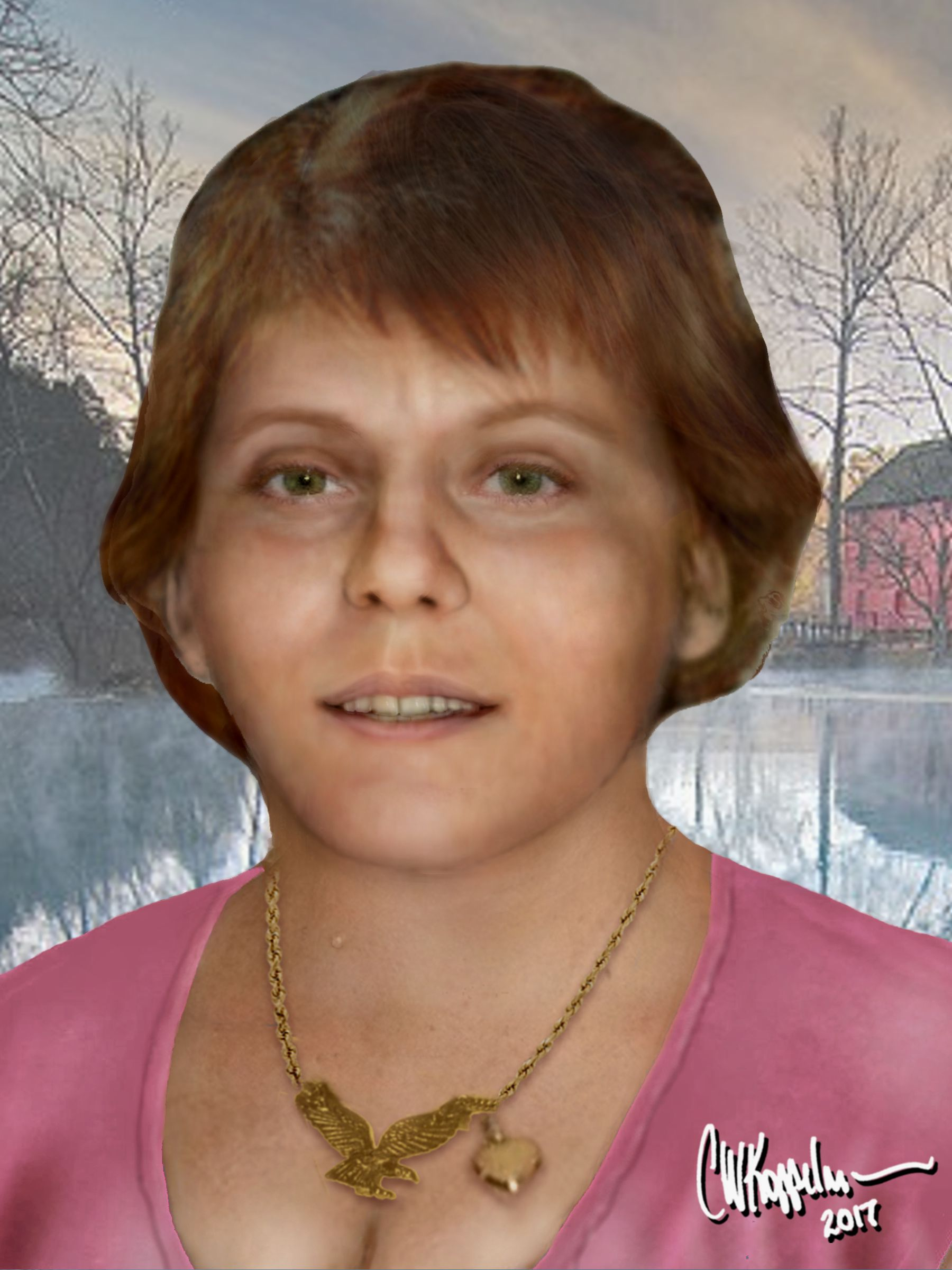
Reconstruction of Pilgrim by Carl Koppelman prior to identification

On April 1, 1985, the body of a woman was found in a large white Admiral refrigerator in Gray, Knox County, Kentucky, alongside Route 25. She was found to have died by suffocation. The victim had been dead for a few days and was nude except for two distinctive necklace pendants, one of a heart and the other of a gold-colored eagle, and two pairs of socks; one white, and the other white with green and yellow stripes. There were reports that the victim may have been soliciting a ride to North Carolina over CB radio. Five hundred people attended the Jane Doe victim's televised funeral. The case was a local sensation in Gray, as the town was a "quiet" and "sleepy" place where little out of the ordinary usually happened.

The refrigerator had a decal of the words "Super Woman" on the front. Distinguishing features of the body included a number of moles (on the right side of her neck, near one ankle, and below each breast), a yellow-stained upper incisor, and a scar and other marks on her abdomen, indicating that she had borne a child. Her eyes were light brown and her hair was red and nearly a foot long, which fit the pattern of the Redhead murders. After the autopsy, this victim was determined to be between 24 and 35, and approximately four feet nine to four feet eleven inches tall. It is also possible that she owned the pair of boots found near the refrigerator. Several missing persons have been eliminated as possible matches for the victim.

After the case was publicized in January 2013, the police received some tips, but it is unknown if they became solid leads. On October 1, 2018, the Knox County Sheriff's Office announced this woman had been positively identified as Espy Regina Pilgrim, of western North Carolina. A DNA match was made between her and her grown daughter, who said her mother disappeared when she was six weeks old. Pilgrim also had four older children.

== Suspected victims ==
=== Priscilla Ann Blevins ===
Priscilla Ann Blevins was a 27-year-old woman whose skeletal remains were found along Interstate 40 in Waynesville, North Carolina on March 29, 1985. It is believed she had been placed at the location around the time she went missing a decade earlier. She had disappeared from her home in Charlotte, North Carolina on July 8, 1975. Blevins was identified via DNA and dental records in 2012. No cause or manner of death was determined, and authorities have not specified the type of investigation surrounding her case. Blevins' sister, however, commented that the circumstances of the decedent's discovery appeared to be involuntary. She had reddish-blonde hair.

=== Karen Kaye Knippers ===
On May 25, 1981, law enforcement recovered the decedent from a low water crossing on Missouri Route M near Dixon, Missouri. She had suffered trauma to the face and was strangled with pantyhose. She was clothed but without shoes and was estimated to be between 25 and 40. She had black hair but has nonetheless been tentatively linked to the other cases based on similarities in modus operandi. Named as Pulaski Jane Doe, she was tentatively identified by the DNA Doe Project in December 2019 as Karen Kaye Knippers who was 32 when she was murdered, with legal confirmation taking place on May 25, 2021.

=== Wetzel County Jane Doe ===
Wetzel County victim sketch

On February 13, 1983, the naked body of a white female was found alongside Route 250 near Littleton, in Wetzel County, West Virginia. A pair of senior citizens reported the body, which they originally had thought was a display mannequin. The body had been placed at the area recently, as snow was on the ground but not on the body. Police said that tire tracks and footprints nearby indicated that she was likely transported to this site after death from another location. Their examination concluded she had died about two days previously and was not a victim of sexual assault. Her cause of death was undetermined. Her hair was auburn; by 1985, she was linked possibly to other redheaded women found as homicide victims whose deaths seemed to be related.

With an estimated age between 35 and 45, this victim appeared to have been older than the median for the other women grouped as victims of the serial killer. Her height was estimated at five feet six inches (168 cm) and weight as 135 pounds (61 kg). Her eyes were presumed to be brown, although postmortem changes may have affected eye color. She had two scars, one typical of a Caesarean section, and another on one index finger. The woman's legs and underarms were shaven, indicating attention to grooming not characteristic of a transient or hitchhiker. Witnesses described seeing a middle-aged white male about five feet ten inches (178 cm) and weighing 185 to 200 pounds (84 to 91 kg) near the area where the body was found. The victim may have been seen alive in Wheeling, West Virginia as an employee or customer at a bar. West Virginia authorities are skeptical of whether this victim is related to other victims in the Redhead murders.

=== Lorie Pennell ===
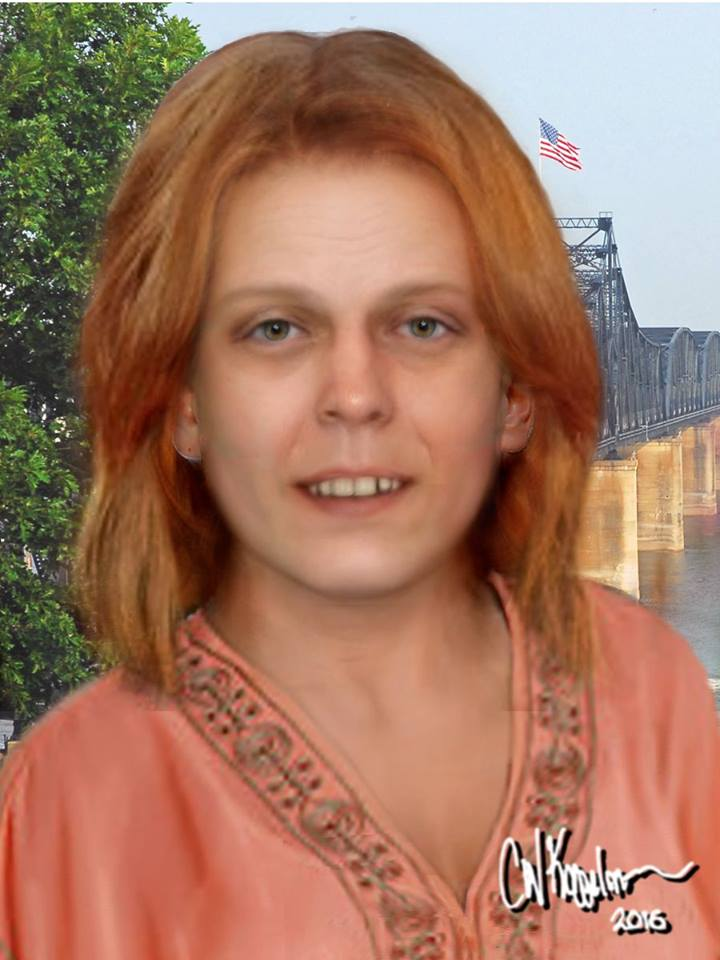
Reconstruction based on Lorie's morgue photograph by Carl Koppelman

22-year-old Lorie Pennell, previously known as Desoto County Jane Doe, was a woman found murdered on January 24, 1985, in Olive Branch, Mississippi. Lorie was found by a truck driver driving southbound on US Highway 78 a hundred feet east of Coldwater River Bridge at around 7:30 a.m. Her body was twenty feet south of the highway and her shoes, underwear, and jacket were missing. She had been strangled with a ligature and possibly sexually assaulted.

=== Elizabeth Lamotte ===
Elizabeth Lamotte

On April 14, 1985, the body of a young white female was found in Greeneville, Greene County, Tennessee. She was determined to have been killed, between three and six weeks prior, by severe blunt-force trauma and possibly a stab wound; her body was in an advanced state of decomposition. Police were able to obtain her fingerprints, as well as DNA and dental information. She had been approximately six to eight weeks pregnant, miscarrying shortly before death.

She was estimated to be 14 to 20 (possibly as old as 25). She was approximately 5'4"-5'6" (163–168 cm) tall, with a weight of 130 to 140 pounds (59 to 64 kg). She had a slight overbite and had some fillings in her teeth, showing that she had dental care in life. Her fingernails had pink polish. Because she had light brown to darkish blond hair with red highlights, her case was thought to be possibly related to the Redhead murders. Authorities hoped in late April 1985 that they would identify her body through fingerprints but were unsuccessful. Six missing women were ruled out as possible identities of the victim.

She was not identified until November 2018, when officials announced she was New Hampshire native Elizabeth Lamotte. She was 17 at the time of her death. Lamotte had disappeared on April 6, 1984. She was identified through a DNA match with a DNA profile obtained from Lamotte's family by New Hampshire police in 2017. She had been staying at a group home in Manchester, New Hampshire and never returned to her family once gaining furlough.

Lamotte's family was earlier asked for a DNA profile to compare it to the adult female victim of the Bear Brook murders, as an unidentified girlfriend of the suspect "Robert Evans" was also known as Elizabeth. "Robert Evans" was later revealed to be the serial killer Terry Peder Rasmussen, and the adult Bear Brook murder victim was identified as Marlyse Elizabeth Honeychurch.

=== Pulaski County Jane Doe ===
Pulaski County Jane Doe was a woman who was found deceased on April 20, 1985, in Wrightsville, Arkansas. She was estimated to be 30 to 40 and had blondish-red hair. Her cause of death has neither been released nor properly determined. Little has been made available about her case.

=== Betty Lou Wisley ===
Roane County Jane Doe was a woman found on August 29, 1987, in Roane County, Tennessee. She was estimated to be between 35 and 50 and had naturally brown hair, dyed reddish. Authorities determined that the body had been burned, likely deliberately to hinder identification efforts. She is believed to have been murdered. In 2023, the woman was identified as Betty Lou Wisley of Knox County.

=== Stacey Lyn Chahorski ===
19-year-old Stacey Lyn Chahorski was found strangled to death in Rising Fawn, Georgia in late 1988. She was officially reported missing in January 1989, four months after she was last contacted. Chahorski had informed her mother, via telephone, that she was planning to hitch rides from her current location to her home state of Michigan. Her remains were discovered along the east side of northbound I-59 near Rising Fawn in Dade County, Georgia, approximately five miles from the Georgia and Alabama state line. It was determined she had been sexually assaulted and strangled. She also had brownish, strawberry blond, auburn or red, shoulder-length hair with frosted ends. She was identified with assistance from Othram Inc. in late March 2022.

On September 6, 2022, Chahorski's killer was identified as trucker and stunt driver Henry Frederick "Hoss" Wise, who would have been 34 at the time of her murder. He worked for the Western Carolina trucking company, and commonly drove through Chattanooga and Nashville, Tennessee and Birmingham, Alabama. He had a criminal history in three states ranging from theft and assault to obstruction of a police officer. Wise burned to death in a car accident at Myrtle Beach Speedway in South Carolina in 1999.

=== Donna Sue Nelton ===
Benton County Jane Doe was a woman who was found murdered on May 7, 1990, in Rogers, Arkansas. After she had been shot, she was set on fire. A neighbor reported seeing a fire in the area in February 1990, but never went to investigate. Investigators believed the victim may have been run over with a vehicle to make identification more difficult. She was identified on October 25, 2022, by Othram Inc. as 28-year-old Donna Nelton, who was last seen in the fall of 1989.

== Investigation ==
It is believed that most of the victims remained unidentified due to their estrangement from family members or from not being native to the states in which they were found. Around 1985, soon after the Greene County victim was discovered, Pennsylvania, Tennessee, Arkansas, and Mississippi requested the Federal Bureau of Investigation for assistance with their cases, as inconsistencies existed. Victims were found both clothed and unclothed and some had a sexual encounter before their murders. During the conference, it was stated that four victims were found in Texas and the victim found in 1981 in Ohio, nicknamed "Buckskin Girl” (later identified as Marcia King), were ruled out in 1985 as possible victims in the Redhead murders.

A possible suspect emerged around 1985 when a 37-year-old trucker from Cleveland, Tennessee, Jerry Leon Johns, attacked and attempted to strangle a woman with reddish hair. He left the victim lying near a highway, thinking she was dead. He was later dismissed in the Redhead murders case but was convicted of the woman's kidnapping in 1987. Despite his exclusion from the case, it was announced that DNA from Johns was matched to Tina Farmer through CODIS in 2016. He died in prison in 2015 at the age of 67. A grand jury decided he would have been indicted for the slaying, had he been alive.

Another suspect, a 32-year-old trucker in Pennsylvania, was questioned after kidnapping and raping a young woman in Indiana. She managed to escape before sustaining further injury. This suspect was also dismissed from the investigation, after being questioned by Tennessee police. In 2018 an Elizabethton, Tennessee teacher, Alex Campbell, offered a sociology class studying these murders. The class potentially identified three new victims and developed a profile of the killer.

== See also ==
- List of fugitives from justice who disappeared
- List of serial killers in the United States
- List of solved missing person cases
- Dr. No (serial killer)
