= Bear Brook murders =

Four murder victims found in Bear Brook State Park in New Hampshire

Marlyse Honeychurch, 24

Marie Vaughn, 7

Rea Rasmussen, age 2–4

Sarah McWaters, 11 months
Victims of the Bear Brook murders
- Date: Disappeared in November 1978; Bodies found on November 10, 1985, and May 9, 2000
- Location: Bear Brook State Park, Allenstown, New Hampshire, U.S.
- Also known as: Allenstown Four
- Cause: Blunt trauma
- Deaths: Marlyse Elizabeth Honeychurch; Marie Elizabeth Vaughn; Sarah Lynn McWaters; Rea Rasmussen, daughter of Terry Rasmussen
- Suspects: Terry Peder Rasmussen (alias Robert "Bob" Evans)

The Bear Brook murders (also referred to as the Allenstown Four) are female American murder victims, two discovered in 1985 and two in 2000, at Bear Brook State Park in Allenstown, New Hampshire, United States. All were either partially or completely skeletonized; all were believed to have been murdered between 1977 and 1981.

In 2017, investigators named Terry Peder Rasmussen (1943–2010) as the most likely suspect. He was also confirmed, via DNA analysis, as the father of a 2-to-4-year-old girl who was one of the Bear Brook victims. Rasmussen is believed to be responsible for several other murders, including that of Denise Beaudin, his known girlfriend, who disappeared in 1981. Rasmussen was convicted and sentenced for the murder in 2002 of his then-wife, Eunsoon Jun; he died in prison in 2010.

In 2019, authorities announced that the three biologically related females had been identified as a mother, Marlyse Elizabeth Honeychurch, and her two daughters (of different biological fathers) Marie Elizabeth Vaughn and Sarah Lynn McWaters, last seen in November 1978. The middle child was identified in 2025 as Rea Rasmussen. Based on the date they disappeared, available documents and Rasmussen's activities, the victims most likely died between 1978 and 1981.

== Discovery ==
On November 10, 1985, a hunter found a metal 55-gallon drum near the site of a burned-down store at Bear Brook State Park in Allenstown, New Hampshire. Inside were the bodies of an adult female and a young girl, wrapped in plastic. Autopsies determined both had died of blunt trauma.

They were buried in an Allenstown cemetery with a tombstone that read: "Here lies the mortal remains known only to God of a woman aged 23–33 and a girl child aged 8–10. Their slain bodies were found on November 10th, 1985, in Bear Brook State Park. May their souls find peace in God's loving care."

On May 9, 2000, the remains of two young girls were found near the first discovery site. The bodies were also in a metal 55-gallon drum, and police believe that all four murders occurred at roughly the same time, despite their having inexplicably missed the second drum in 1985. According to investigators, it took so long to discover the second drum because it was outside the initial crime scene. The cause of death for all the children was blunt force trauma.

== Examination ==
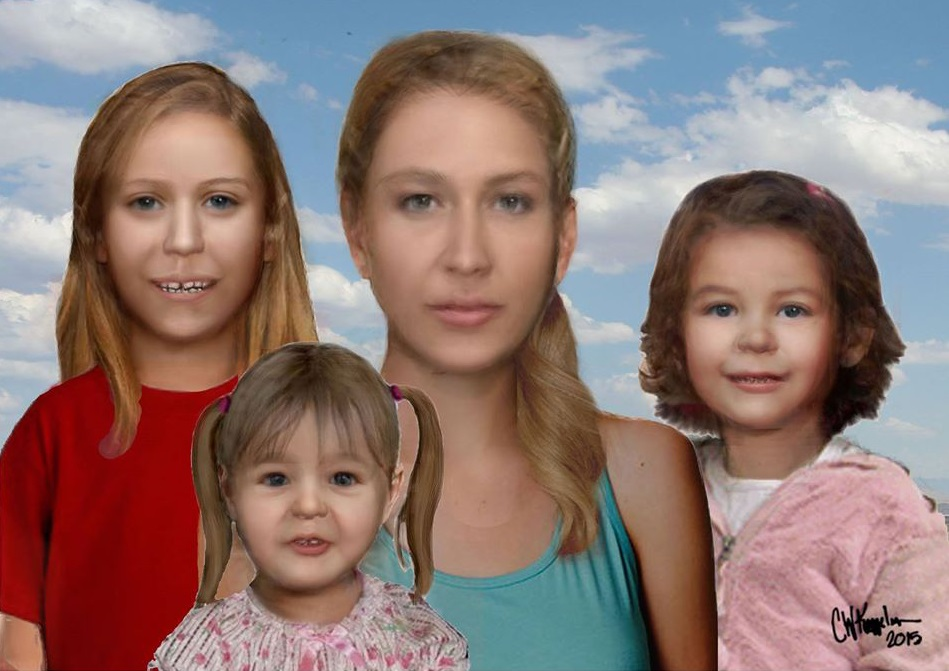
Reconstructions of the victims by Carl Koppelman.

The adult, later identified as Honeychurch, was determined to be Caucasian with possible Native American ancestry. Her age at the time of death was estimated to be 23 to 33. She had curly or wavy brown hair and was between 5 ft 2 in (1.57 m) and 5 ft 7 in (1.70 m) in height. Her teeth showed significant dental work, including multiple fillings and three extractions. The three girls were thought to also have some Native American heritage; they had light or European-American complexions.

The girl found with the adult female, later identified as Vaughn, was between 5 and 11 years old. She had symptoms of pneumonia, a crooked front tooth and a diastema (space between her top teeth), two earrings in each ear, and was between 4 ft 3 in (1.30 m) and 4 ft 6 in (1.37 m) tall. Her hair was wavy and light brown; she had no dental fillings.

The middle child, later identified as Rea Rasmussen (b. 1976 in Orange County, California) also had a notable gap between her front teeth and had died at an age between 2 and 4. She had brown hair and was about 3 ft 8 in (1.12 m) tall. She had an overbite, which was probably noticeable. She also may have suffered from anemia. DNA proved this child was fathered by Terry Peder Rasmussen. In February 2020, it was announced that DNA analysis suggested the child was primarily Caucasian, with slight Asian, African, and Native American heritage. However, updated testing in 2024 revealed she was of full European descent. Prior to her 2025 identification, the organization had released an updated version of the child's facial reconstruction.

The youngest girl, later identified as McWaters, was estimated to be 1 to 3 years old, had long blond or light brown hair, was between 2 ft 1 in (0.64 m) and 2 ft 6 in (0.76 m) tall, and also had a gap between her front teeth.

== Investigation ==
In the early days of the investigation, authorities publicized the case in the United States and some parts of Canada. At least ten possible identities were ruled out. Despite hundreds of leads, the bodies were not identified.

In June 2013, new versions of the victims' facial reconstructions were created by the National Center for Missing & Exploited Children (NCMEC). These versions incorporated their dental information, showing how their teeth could have affected the appearance of their faces. The reconstructions were created in black and white, as their skin tones and eye colors could not be determined.

In November 2015, NCMEC released a third set of reconstructions of the four victims at a news conference at the New Hampshire State Attorney General's office.

=== DNA and isotopic evidence ===
In 2014, police announced that DNA profiling had revealed through mitochondrial DNA that the woman, and oldest and youngest girls were maternally related. This means that the woman could have been the girls' mother, aunt, or older sister. In 2015, it was established that the woman was the mother of the two girls.

Other forensic information showed that the woman and children lived together in the Northeastern United States between two weeks and three months before their deaths. Investigators have concluded the woman and two of the children lived in the area where their bodies were found. Advanced forensic testing showed the 2-to-4-year-old girl (since identified as Rasmussen's daughter) probably spent most of her childhood in either the upper Northeast or upper Midwest, perhaps Wisconsin. In 2019, however, it is stated that the nonrelated child most likely originated from Arizona, Texas, California or Oregon, although additional locations cannot be excluded.

=== Later developments ===
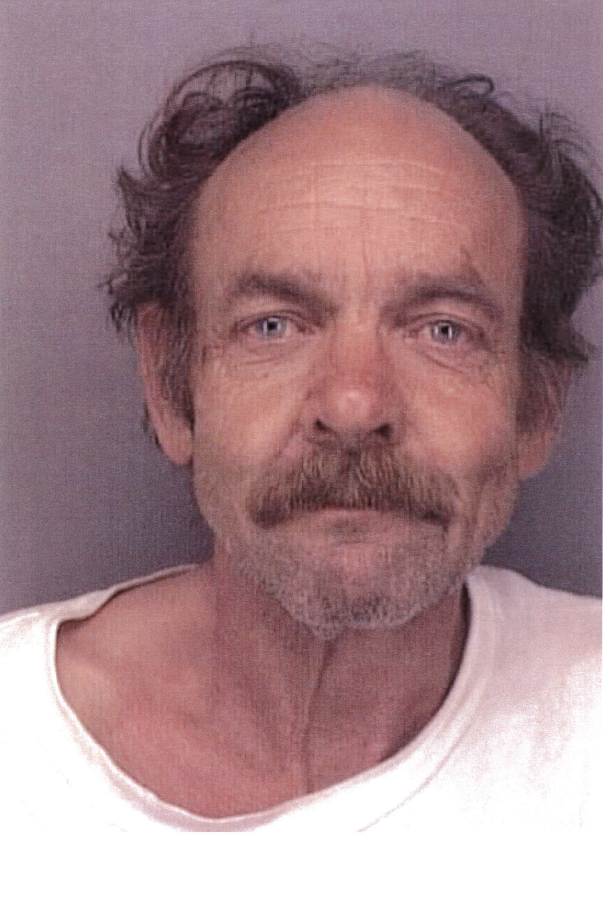
Terry Peder Rasmussen pictured in 2002 after his arrest for the murder of Eunsoon Jun

In January 2017, it was announced that the disappearance of Denise Beaudin, a woman from New Hampshire who had been missing since 1981, was connected to the Bear Brook murders.

By November 27, 1981, Beaudin had disappeared from Manchester, New Hampshire, along with her young daughter and then-boyfriend Robert "Bob" Evans, after she was last seen by her family in Goffstown for Thanksgiving. Evans later abandoned a young girl, "Lisa", at a campground in California in 1986, while he was living under a different alias, and served prison time for the abandonment. In 2003, after Evans was arrested under yet another alias for the murder of Eunsoon Jun, police began an investigation into Evans' past and conducted a DNA test, which found that Lisa was not his daughter. However, it was not until 2016 when, with the help of detective Peter Headley of the San Bernardino County Sheriff's Office and genetic genealogist Barbara Rae-Venter, "Lisa" was discovered to be Beaudin's daughter. Beaudin was subsequently reported missing and, based on Evans' modus operandi, was believed to have also been killed by Evans. "Lisa" is keeping her name private.

Due to the proximity between Manchester where Beaudin disappeared and Allenstown where the barrels were found, New Hampshire authorities suspected the cases were connected. They performed DNA testing and found that the Bear Brook adult victim was not Beaudin; however Evans was found to be the father of the middle child (who was not related to the three other victims). They also said that "Robert Evans" was a pseudonym and that the man's legal identity was unknown.

Evans died in prison in December 2010. He had been convicted and sentenced under another alias, Curtis Kimball, for the 2002 murder and dismemberment of his wife at the time, Eunsoon Jun, a chemist in California. Authorities believed that Evans was the killer of the four Bear Brook victims but did not elaborate.

In June 2017, police released a video of a police interview of Evans in hopes of finding his true identity. At the same time, Rae-Venter was helping to narrow down Evans' identity using genetic genealogy. Two months later, Robert Evans was confirmed as Terry Peder Rasmussen, through Y-DNA testing from a DNA sample contributed by one of his children from what is believed to be his first marriage. Born in 1943, Rasmussen was a native of Denver, Colorado. He married in 1968, had four children between 1969 and 1972, and lived in Phoenix, Arizona, and Redwood City, California. His wife left him between 1973 and 1974, and his family last saw him around Christmas 1974. One of his children from this marriage provided the DNA sample that confirmed Rasmussen as Evans in June 2017. Rasmussen, known as the Chameleon Killer, is believed to have used "at least five different aliases in a decades-long run of crimes across the country, including at least five homicides, and likely more." This was the first major case in which genetic genealogy was used to identify a crime suspect, a method which would later be used to solve several high-profile cold cases such as the Golden State Killer case.

=== Identifications ===
Sarah's younger half-brother, who had never met her, created a post in 1999 on the Ancestry.com website in efforts to locate her. She was born in Hawaiian Gardens, California, when her father was in the Marines. In October 2018, librarian and web sleuth Rebekah Heath, who was looking for possible identities of the Bear Brook victims, found the post. She also found that Sarah's mother, Marlyse Honeychurch, had an older daughter with her first husband, and that their ages matched those of the three related Bear Brook victims. Significantly, one of Sarah's relatives who Heath contacted mentioned that Honeychurch had married a man with the last name Rasmussen. This made Heath almost certain that they were the three related Bear Brook victims, and Heath shared her findings with detective Peter Headley.

On June 6, 2019, New Hampshire investigators held a press conference regarding the case and revealed the identities of three of the victims. Marlyse Elizabeth Honeychurch (b. 1954) was the mother of Marie Elizabeth Vaughn (b. 1971) and Sarah Lynn McWaters (b. 1977), all of whom went missing from La Puente, California, around Thanksgiving 1978, while she was dating Rasmussen. Honeychurch had an argument with her mother and left the residence, never contacting her relatives again. Honeychurch may have adopted the alias name "Elizabeth Evans" to use in legal documents during May 1980. It is believed that all four victims were murdered before 1981, as Rasmussen was known to have left New Hampshire after this time.

Marlyse had previously married Marie's father in June 1971 and divorced by 1974. She married Sarah's father in September 1974, and they were separated by the time she was known to be dating Rasmussen. The children both went through periods where they were in the custody of their fathers, but Marlyse would later regain guardianship. By October 1978, Sarah's father was seeing another woman and Sarah was presumably in the care of her mother.

Honeychurch and Vaughn's funeral was held in November 2019 in Allenstown, during which they were given a new headstone bearing their names. In attendance were members of Honeychurch's family and Rasmussen's daughter from his first marriage. Sarah was laid to rest in Connecticut, closer to her father's family.

The fourth victim's identity was discovered in 2025. Prior to this, investigators stated that through advanced DNA testing they could confirm the child was Rasmussen's. The mother of the child was named as Pepper Reed (born 1952), who had disappeared in the 1970s. In February 2020, a new rendering of the fourth victim was released by the National Center for Missing & Exploited Children and New Hampshire State Police. In 2021, investigators revealed that the middle child's mother had relatives in Pearl River County, Mississippi; the following year, they determined that she was most likely a descendant of Thomas "Deadhorse" Mitchell, a man who was born in 1836 and would be the fifth- or sixth-great-grandfather of the child. Rasmussen's daughter, Andrea Stiers, has said that she believes she met Jane Doe when she was very young. She also believes that Jane Doe was half-Asian. In September 2025, New Hampshire police positively identified the "middle" child as Rea Rasmussen, Terry Rasmussen's daughter.

== In media ==
In 2018, New Hampshire Public Radio covered the Bear Brook murders, as well as other posthumous findings on Rasmussen, on the first season of the true crime podcast, Bear Brook.

== See also ==
- Bear Brook podcast
- Denise Daneault, missing person last seen in June 1980 near where Rasmussen was living at the time
- List of murdered American children
- List of unsolved deaths
- Unidentified decedent
