= Allenstown Meeting House =

Historic church in New Hampshire, United States

- U.S. National Register of Historic Places
- NH State Register of Historic Places
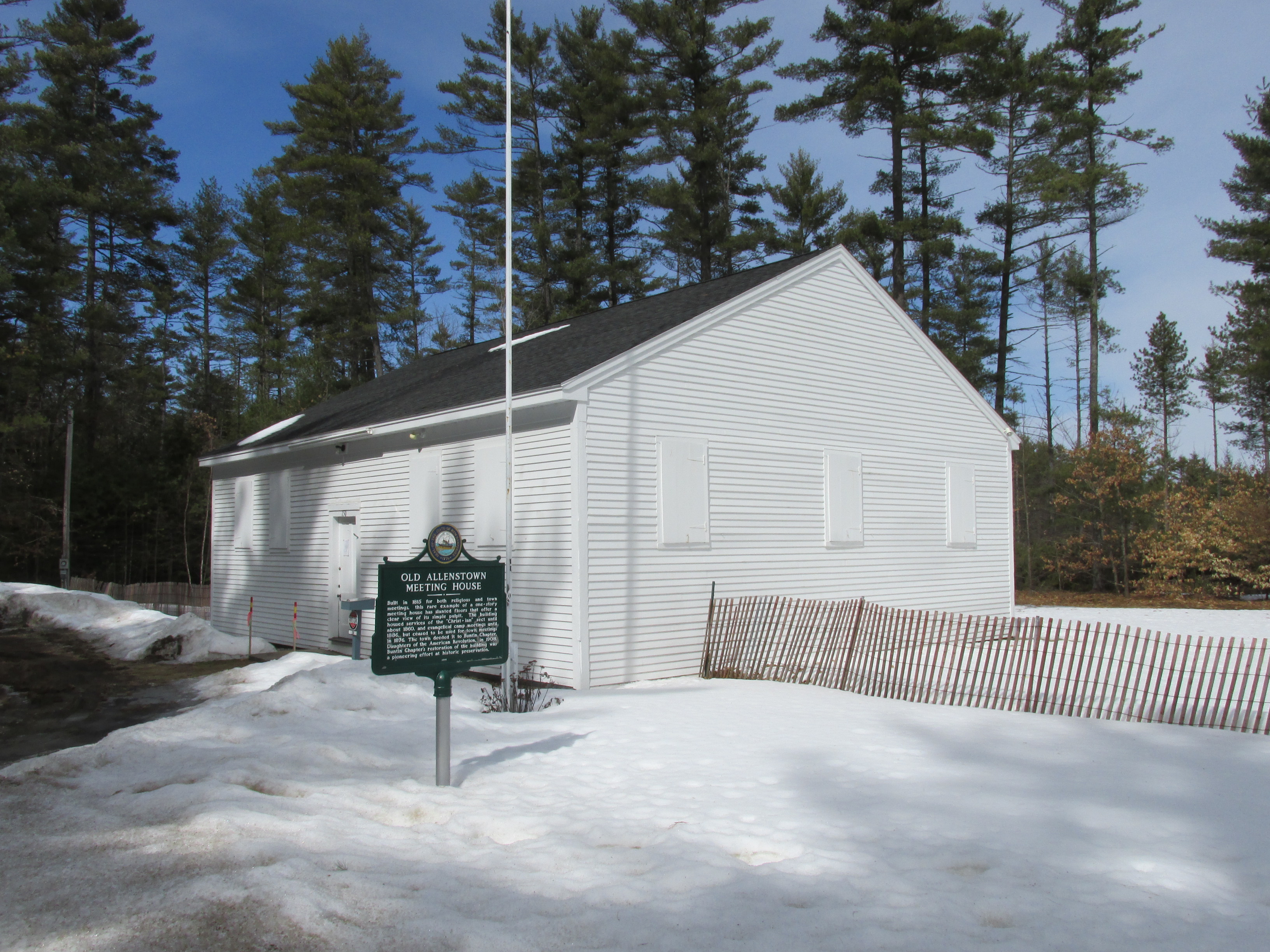
- Allenstown Meeting House

- Location within New Hampshire Location within the United States
- Location: Deerfield Rd., Allenstown, New Hampshire
- Coordinates: 43°9′37″N 71°22′53″W
- Area: 0.4 acres (0.16 ha)
- Built: 1815
- Architect: Kenison, James, Samuel & Nathaniel; et al.
- Architectural style: Federal
- NRHP reference No.: 04001327

Significant dates
- Added to NRHP: December 06, 2004
- Designated NHSRHP: July 26, 2004

The Allenstown Meeting House (also known as Old Allenstown Meeting House; Church of Christ; Christian Church) is a historic meeting house on Deerfield Road in Allenstown, New Hampshire. Built in 1815, it is New Hampshire's only surviving Federal-style single-story meeting house to serve both religious and civic functions. It was listed on the National Register of Historic Places in December 2004, and the New Hampshire State Register of Historic Places in July 2004. It is presently owned and maintained by the town.

== Description and history ==
The Allenstown Meeting House stands in a rural setting on the north side of the town, on the north side of Deerfield Road west of New Rye Road. Although it is within the boundaries of Bear Brook State Park, it is currently owned and maintained by the town. It is a single-story wood-frame structure with a gable roof, resting on a granite foundation. It has a heavy timber frame and is sheathed in wooden clapboards. The main facade faces the road to the south, and is five bays wide, with a central door flanked by two windows on either side. The interior has retained its original box pews and pulpit. The northwest corner of the building was damaged by arson fire in 1985, but has been sensitively restored. Interior features include a slightly sloping wooden floor, to improve visibility by people sitting in the rear of the hall.

The meeting house was built in 1815 on land donated by Judge Hall Burgin, originally intended as a church. The church proprietors were financially unable to complete the building, so the town stepped in to finance its completion. It served as the town's main civic and religious building from then until 1876, when it was abandoned for civic purposes, and the small Protestant congregation dispersed to other area churches. In 1908 the town deeded its ownership share to a local chapter of the Daughters of the American Revolution (DAR), which oversaw its maintenance. After an arsonist attempted to burn it down in 1985, the DAR chapter offered it to the state, which undertook some restoration in 1993–94. The town acquired it from the state in 2004. It is the only surviving single-story meeting house of the period in New Hampshire.

== See also ==
- National Register of Historic Places listings in Merrimack County, New Hampshire
- New Hampshire Historical Marker No. 193: Old Allenstown Meeting House / Meeting House Burying Ground
