= Barbara Rae-Venter =

American genetic genealogist

- Born: July 17, 1948 (age 77); Auckland, New Zealand
- Citizenship: New Zealand; United States
- Education: University of California, San Diego; University of Texas at Austin
- Known for: Genetic genealogy
- Spouses: J. Craig Venter (m. 1968; sep. 1980) Joseph Elmer Huff III (m. 1981; div. 1983)
- Children: 1
- Scientific career
- Fields: Genetics; Patent law; Cancer research

Barbara Rae-Venter (born July 17, 1948) is a New Zealand-born American genetic genealogist, biologist, and retired patent attorney best known for her work helping police and investigators identify Joseph James DeAngelo as the Golden State Killer.

After retirement from her law career, Rae-Venter started researching her family history as a hobby in an attempt to help a family member find his biological family. As part of this work, she was asked to help identify a woman who had been abducted as a child. Her efforts in this case eventually identified Terry Peder Rasmussen as the suspect in the Bear Brook murders in New Hampshire. In 2019 she was included in the Time 100 list of most influential people and in 2018 was recognized in Nature's 10, a list of "people who mattered" in science by the journal Nature. Barbara authored the book I Know Who You Are: How an amatueur DNA sleuth unmasked the Golden State Killer and changed crime fighting forever in 2023.

== Early career ==
Barbara Rae was born on July 17, 1948, in Auckland, New Zealand, and raised in Auckland's Remuera neighborhood. She moved to the United States at age 20, and has United States citizenship. She earned a Bachelor of Arts degree in psychology and biochemistry from the University of California at San Diego in 1972, and received her Ph.D. in biology at the same institution in 1976. From 1976 to 1979 she was a postdoctoral fellow at Roswell Park Comprehensive Cancer Center (then known as the Roswell Park Memorial Institute) in Buffalo, New York. From 1979 to 1983 she was assistant professor at the University of Texas Medical Branch in Galveston, Texas. Rae-Venter focused her research career on breast and gastrointestinal cancer.

She matriculated at the University of Texas at Austin Law School in May 1983 and received her J.D. in August 1985. She later worked as a patent lawyer in California specializing in biotechnology and was an assistant professor at Stanford University from 1988 to 1990.

== Genetic genealogy ==
The field of genetic genealogy was developed largely by volunteer family history hobbyists, and Rae-Venter realized that the techniques used to identify family members in adoption cases could have wider uses in law enforcement and the identification of suspects and victims of crime. Some law enforcement agencies were initially dismissive of the idea.

Rae-Venter's interest in genealogy began when she found a relative through a website for sharing family trees who was looking to identify his biological father. In order to help her relative search for his father, she completed an online course on how to use genetic testing to find relatives, eventually becoming one of the course's teachers.

Rae-Venter has been involved in solving several high-profile criminal cases, including the Bear Brook murders in New Hampshire and the Golden State Killer in California. In 2018, after her role in using genetics and genealogy to solve crimes became well-known, Rae-Venter was named in Nature's list of "10 People who Mattered this Year". She was recognized in the 2019 Time 100 list of most influential people.

=== Bear Brook murders ===
Rae-Venter's initial involvement with using publicly-available genetic databases and family trees to contribute to criminal investigations started in 2015, when she was asked to assist investigators in identifying the true identity of a woman who had been kidnapped as an infant. In addition to searching for family members whose DNA matched the woman's genetic profile on publicly available websites, Rae-Venter suggested the woman submit her sample to closed databases in the hopes of finding more family members. The case evolved to require 20,000 hours of work and a significant number of volunteers who were able to identify the woman's birth name and to put her in contact with one of her grandfathers.

In addition to identifying the woman's family and birth name, Rae-Venter and her team identified the birth mother of a relative found during the search, which allowed them to meet. The identification of this woman led authorities to link her kidnapper to a series of murders in New Hampshire, known as the Bear Brook murders. Rae-Venter contributed to the eventual identification of the suspect's true identity, Terry Peder Rasmussen, using DNA obtained from his autopsy after his death in prison. Rasmussen had been imprisoned for another murder under the name Larry Vanner. In 2019, three of the victims of the Bear Brook murders were identified as 24 year-old Marlyse Elizabeth Honeychurch, and her daughters, Marie Elizabeth Vaughn (6 years old) and Sarah Lynn McWaters (1 year old).

=== Golden State Killer ===
Paul Holes, a forensic investigator, who had been working on the Golden State Killer case for decades, initially contacted Rae-Venter in March 2017 for her assistance in using genealogy to search for new leads in the case. In October 2017, Rae-Venter was contributing to the team attempting to identify the killer. Rae-Venter utilized GEDmatch, Family Tree DNA, and MyHeritage and provided structure to the team's genetic search efforts. The team isolated a DNA sample from a Golden State Killer crime scene to create a DNA profile that could be uploaded to the genealogy databases, which produced positive matches to several distant relatives, and from these Rae-Venter was able to build a family tree using traditional family research techniques. By identifying relatives of the killer, investigators could first work back to find a common ancestor, and then work forward to identify all members of the family's younger generations. Once all the members of a family had been identified, investigators could then start eliminating individuals who were not suspects. In the case of the Golden State Killer, the team needed to go back to great-great-great grandparents before starting to work forward. Multiple family trees needed to be constructed. This information was combined with predictions about ethnicity and physical appearance to narrow down the suspect list. Multiple pieces of evidence started to converge when the genetic profiles were considered, including the possibility that the suspect had Italian heritage. After the suspect had been identified, new DNA samples were collected from the suspect surreptitiously and tested against crime scene samples. The suspect's samples matched those from the killer, confirming his identity. Joseph DeAngelo was arrested on April 24, 2018.

In the immediate aftermath of the arrest, Rae-Venter chose not to be publicly identified, out of fears for her personal safety. Several months after the arrest of the Golden State Killer, Rae-Venter allowed Holes to identify her publicly. The intervening months had seen increased interest in genetic genealogy, and additional people had been identified in the field. After her role in the Golden State Killer case became well-known, Rae-Venter was approached to assist in at least 50 unsolved cases, including homicides and unidentified victims.

=== Additional cases ===
As one of the first public faces of genetic genealogy in law enforcement in the United States, Rae-Venter has been asked to consult on additional cases, and also to comment on the ethics of using shared community data for law enforcement purposes. She has also been one of the most sought after voices when ethical questions arise about the use of shared genetic data by law enforcement. At the conclusion of the Golden State Killer case, Rae-Venter discussed future cases that she was working on, including the "Boy in the Box" case in Pennsylvania.

In 2019, Rae-Venter helped identify Bobby Whitt, a boy who had been found in Mebane, North Carolina in 1998. Based on the DNA profile of the child, she determined that the child was likely of mixed Asian and white descent. Searches of online databases identified a possible relative, who could identify the child. Whitt's family had assumed he had returned to South Korea with his mother. This discovery also resulted in the identification of his mother's remains. A suspect, who was already incarcerated on other charges was identified.

== Personal life ==
In the late 1960s, while in Sydney, Australia, Rae-Venter met J. Craig Venter, a US Navy sailor on leave from the Vietnam War. They reunited while she was on a three-month hiking tour of Europe, and they were married in Geneva in 1968. They separated in 1980, and have one child. She married Joseph Elmer Huff III on September 21, 1981, divorcing in April 1983. Later in her career, Rae-Venter became involved in the Human Genome Project, sequencing the first copy of the human genome. In the course of her research into her own family tree, Rae-Venter identified a great uncle who worked as a police officer in London during the time Jack the Ripper was active.

== Selected publications ==
- Rae-Venter, B.; Reid, L. M. (1980). "Growth of human breast carcinomas in nude mice and subsequent establishment in tissue culture". Cancer Research. 40 (1): 95–100. PMID 6243091.
- Rae-Venter, B.; Nemoto, T.; Schneider, S. L.; Dao, T. L. (1981). "Prolactin binding by human mammary carcinoma: Relationship to estrogen receptor protein concentration and patient age". Breast Cancer Research and Treatment. 1 (3): 233–243. doi:10.1007/BF01806263. PMID 6293628. S2CID 24278474.
- Rae-Venter, B.; Dao, T. L. (1982). "Kinetic properties of rat hepatic prolactin receptors". Biochemical and Biophysical Research Communications. 107 (2): 624–632. doi:10.1016/0006-291X(82)91537-6. PMID 6289836.
- Rae-Venter, B.; Dao, T. L. (1983). "Hydrodynamic properties of rat hepatic prolactin receptors". Archives of Biochemistry and Biophysics. 222 (1): 12–21. doi:10.1016/0003-9861(83)90497-6. PMID 6301378.
- I Know Who You Are. How an Amateur DNA Sleuth Unmasked the Golden State Killer and Changed Crime Fighting Forever. February 6, 2024
