= Bear Brook State Park =

State park in Merrimack County, New Hampshire

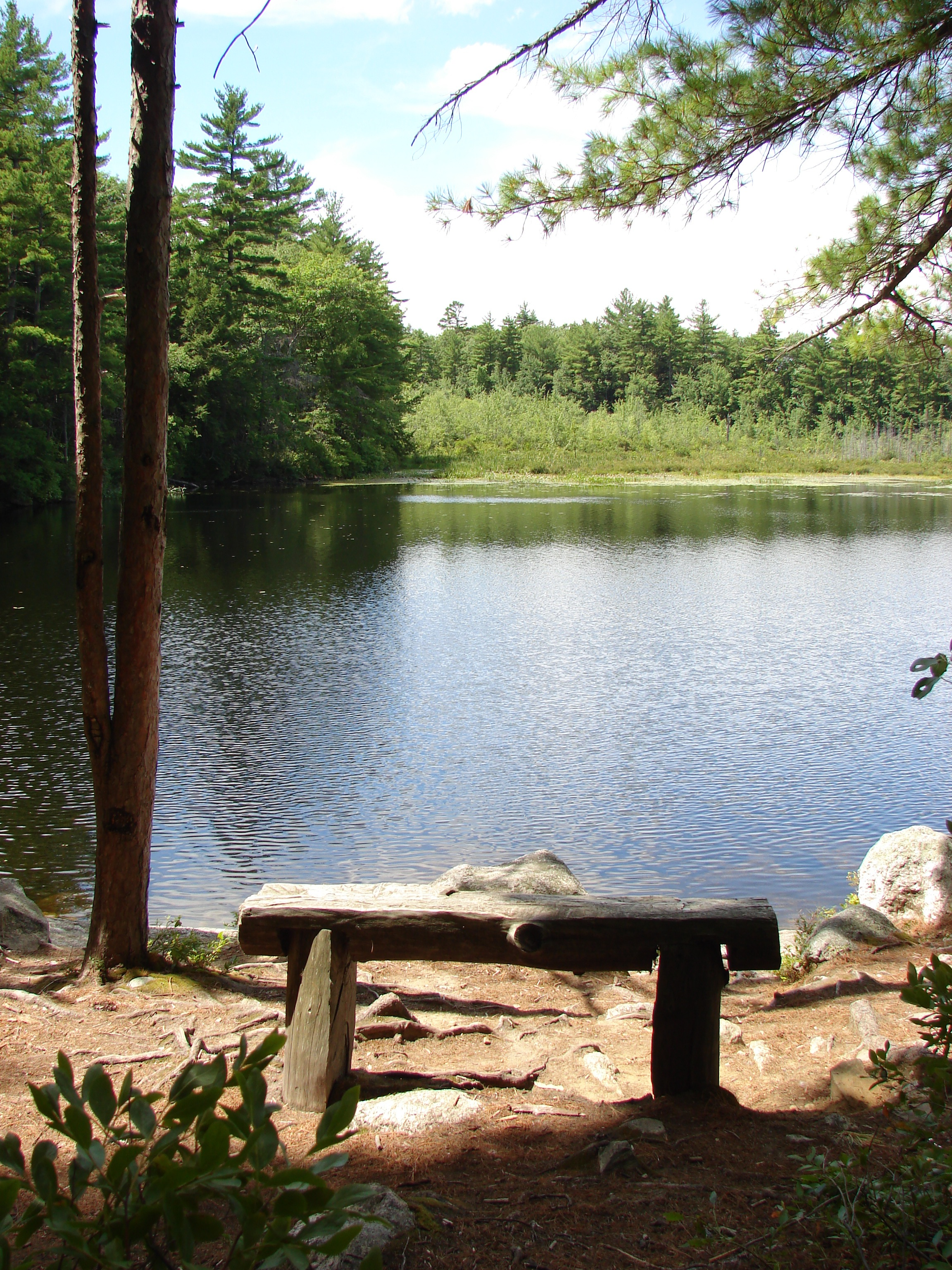
- Beaver Pond as seen from the Beaver Pond Trail near the campground

- Location within New Hampshire
- Interactive map of Bear Brook State Park
- Location: Allenstown, Hooksett, Deerfield, and Candia, New Hampshire, United States
- Coordinates: 43°06′25″N 71°21′07″W
- Area: 9,976 acres (4,037 ha)
- Elevation: 617 feet (188 m)
- Established: 1943
- Administrator: New Hampshire Division of Parks and Recreation
- Website: Official website
- New Hampshire State Parks

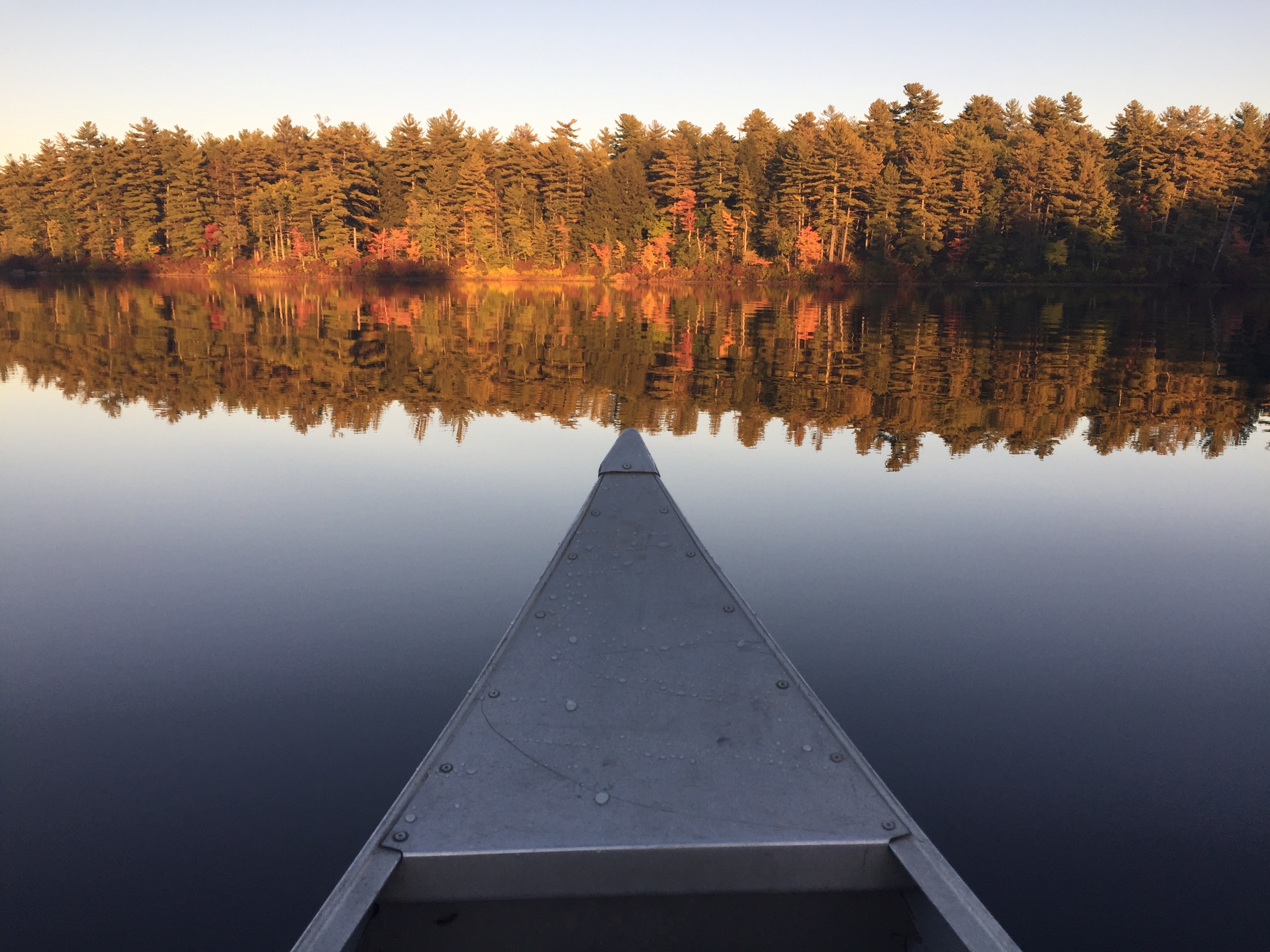
Canoe on Spruce Pond

Bear Brook State Park is a 10,000-acre (4,000 ha) preserve in Allenstown, New Hampshire, and neighboring towns. It is one of New Hampshire's largest state parks.

== Description ==
The park takes its name from Bear Brook, a stream which runs through the park. Its environment is that of the Northeastern coastal forests ecoregion.

Amenities at Bear Brook include camp sites, a picnic area, over 40 miles (64 km) of hiking trails, swimming and fishing ponds, archery range, camp store, a ball field, playground, bathhouse, shelters, picnic tables, canoe and rowboat rentals, and a physical fitness course. The park is home to the New Hampshire Snowmobile Museum, Old Allenstown Meeting House, and the Richard Diehl Civilian Conservation Corps (CCC) Museum, which are in historic buildings built by the Civilian Conservation Corps.

== History ==
The park opened to the public in 1943, with The Boston Globe describing it as New Hampshire's "newest public recreation area." With about 7,000 acres in 1962, it was cited as the state's largest state park, with an estimated 143,230 visitors the previous summer. On 1 July of that year, stables opened at the park for trail riding.

== In the news ==
In 1985 and 2000, the remains of a total of four female bodies, one adult and three children, were found in the park. In January 2017, a suspect in the case was identified as Terry Peder Rasmussen (also known by several aliases) who had died in prison in 2010. In June 2019, three of the bodies were identified. In September 2025, the identity of the fourth victim was confirmed.

== See also ==
- Allenstown Meeting House
- Bear Brook State Park Civilian Conservation Corps (CCC) Camp Historic District
