= Allenstown, New Hampshire =

- Town
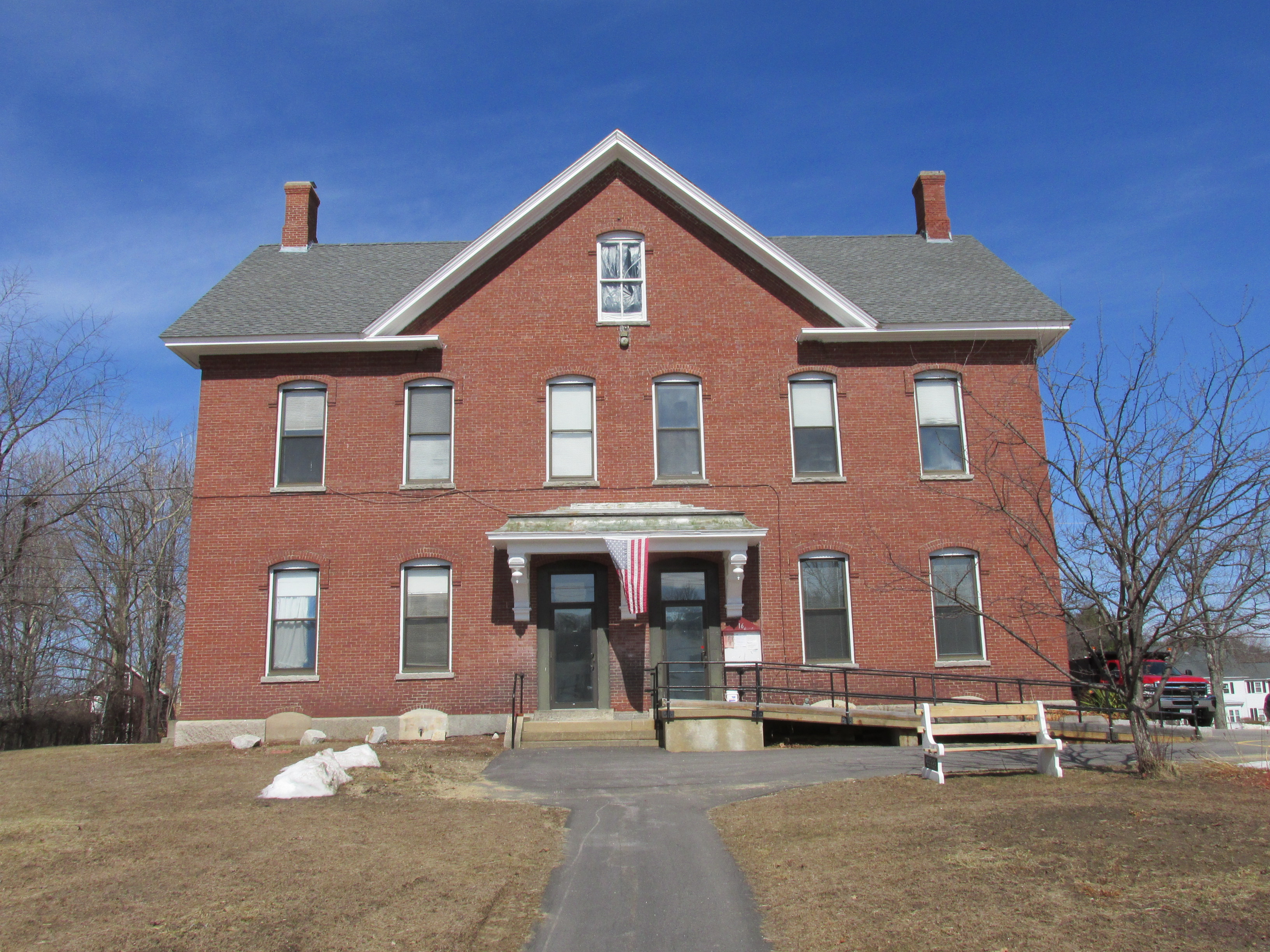
- Allenstown Municipal Building

- Seal

- Location in Merrimack County and the state of New Hampshire.
- Coordinates: 43°08′16″N 71°22′57″W
- Country: United States
- State: New Hampshire
- County: Merrimack
- Incorporated: 1831
- Villages: Allenstown; Suncook (part)

Area
  - Total: 20.6 sq mi (53.3 km^{2})
  - Land: 20.5 sq mi (53.0 km^{2})
  - Water: 0.12 sq mi (0.3 km^{2}) 0.55%
- Elevation: 492 ft (150 m)

Population (2020)
  - Total: 4,707
  - Density: 230/sq mi (88.8/km^{2})
- Time zone: UTC-5 (Eastern)
  - Summer (DST): UTC-4 (Eastern)
- ZIP code: 03275
- Area code: 603
- FIPS code: 33-00660
- GNIS feature ID: 873528
- Website: www.allenstownnh.gov

Allenstown is a town in Merrimack County, New Hampshire, United States. The population was 4,707 at the 2020 census, up from 4,322 at the 2010 census. Allenstown includes a portion of the village of Suncook. Just over one-half of the town's area is covered by Bear Brook State Park.

== History ==
Allenstown takes its name from 17th-century provincial governor Samuel Allen. It was granted in 1721 but not incorporated until July 2, 1831. A part of neighboring Bow was annexed to Allenstown in 1815, and a portion of Hooksett was annexed in 1853.

Most of the town's earliest settlement occurred in the eastern part of town along Deerfield Road, around the area now mostly occupied by Bear Brook State Park, and where the Old Allenstown Meeting House is located. Following the Civil War, the town's population shifted from the east to the west part of town, centered around the confluence of the Merrimack and Suncook rivers, in the area now known as Suncook.

Railroads were instrumental to the development of Allenstown. First, the Concord and Portsmouth Railroad running from Candia and points east arrived in the 1852, but that line was subsequently torn up from Candia to Allenstown, with a new branch being built from the Suncook River down to the Hooksett Falls in 1862. The Suncook Valley Railroad would follow in 1869, which ran northeast along the river, first to Pittsfield and later, to Center Barnstead. While the Suncook depot was just across the river in Pembroke, the Suncook Valley Railroad built Allenstown another depot in the northern part of town, along what is now Verville Road. In 1902, the Concord & Manchester Electric Railway came to town, connecting its two namesakes. It crossed the Suncook Valley track adjacent to the Catholic Church on Main Street; the Blodgett depot was built at that location to facilitate transfers between the steam road and the interurban.

Allenstown, at the junction of the Suncook and Merrimack rivers, proved a prime location in which to harness the Suncook's power for manufacturing. The China Mill, the only large textile mill in the Allenstown part of Suncook, was built in 1868. At this time, a large number of French Canadians, mostly from Quebec, began emigrating to the area to work in the mills. Eventually, Suncook became one of many New England industrial villages known to locals as "le petit Canada."

In 2006, Allenstown was hit hard by the Mother's Day Flood. More than 10 inches (250 mm) of rainfall caused the Suncook River to overflow, inundating homes, roads, and other low-lying areas. As a result of the flood, 14 flood-prone homes in Allenstown were bought out with federal money and demolished in order to avoid more flooding and evacuations in the future.

== Geography ==
According to the United States Census Bureau, the town has a total area of 20.6 square miles (53.3 km^{2}), of which 20.5 square miles (53.0 km^{2}) are land and 0.1 square miles (0.3 km^{2}) are water, comprising 0.55% of the town. The highest point in Allenstown is Bear Hill in the southeastern section of town, at 835 feet (255 m) above sea level. Allenstown lies fully within the Merrimack River watershed. The Merrimack River forms the western border of the town, and its tributary the Suncook River forms the northwest border.

Bear Brook State Park occupies 6,740 acres (27.3 km^{2}) in the central and southeastern parts of town, extending from the town's northern corner to its southern corner. (An additional 3,200 acres (13 km^{2}) of the park are in the neighboring towns of Deerfield, Candia, and Hooksett.)

=== Adjacent municipalities ===
- Epsom (north)
- Deerfield (east)
- Candia (southeast)
- Hooksett (south)
- Bow (west)
- Pembroke (northwest)

== Demographics ==
Historical population
| Census | Pop. | Note | %± |
|---|---|---|---|
| 1790 | 254 | | — |
| 1800 | 315 | | 24.0% |
| 1810 | 346 | | 9.8% |
| 1820 | 433 | | 25.1% |
| 1830 | 421 | | −2.8% |
| 1840 | 455 | | 8.1% |
| 1850 | 526 | | 15.6% |
| 1860 | 414 | | −21.3% |
| 1870 | 804 | | 94.2% |
| 1880 | 1,707 | | 112.3% |
| 1890 | 1,475 | | −13.6% |
| 1900 | 1,496 | | 1.4% |
| 1910 | 1,457 | | −2.6% |
| 1920 | 1,213 | | −16.7% |
| 1930 | 1,549 | | 27.7% |
| 1940 | 1,673 | | 8.0% |
| 1950 | 1,540 | | −7.9% |
| 1960 | 1,789 | | 16.2% |
| 1970 | 2,732 | | 52.7% |
| 1980 | 4,398 | | 61.0% |
| 1990 | 4,649 | | 5.7% |
| 2000 | 4,843 | | 4.2% |
| 2010 | 4,322 | | −10.8% |
| 2020 | 4,707 | | 8.9% |
U.S. Decennial Census

As of the census of 2000, there were 4,843 people, 1,902 households, and 1,253 families residing in the town. The population density was 235.9 inhabitants per square mile (91.1/km^{2}). There were 1,962 housing units at an average density of 95.6 per square mile (36.9/km^{2}). The racial makeup of the town was 97.83% White, 0.50% African American, 0.23% Native American, 0.37% Asian, 0.27% from other races, and 0.81% from two or more races. Hispanic or Latino of any race were 1.18% of the population.

There were 1,902 households, out of which 34.6% had children under the age of 18 living with them, 50.7% were married couples living together, 10.0% had a female householder with no husband present, and 34.1% were non-families. 27.2% of all households were made up of individuals, and 11.3% had someone living alone who was 65 years of age or older. The average household size was 2.53 and the average family size was 3.06.

In the town, the population was spread out, with 27.3% under the age of 18, 6.7% from 18 to 24, 34.3% from 25 to 44, 21.1% from 45 to 64, and 10.6% who were 65 years of age or older. The median age was 36 years. For every 100 females, there were 93.7 males. For every 100 females age 18 and over, there were 90.0 males.

The median income for a household in the town was $41,958, and the median income for a family was $51,659. Males had a median income of $35,520 versus $25,430 for females. The per capita income for the town was $18,851. About 2.2% of families and 3.9% of the population were below the poverty line, including 3.8% of those under age 18 and 4.7% of those age 65 or over.

== Transportation ==
One New Hampshire state routes and one U.S. route cross Allenstown.

- NH 28 enters alongside US 3 in the village of Suncook at the southwestern corner of town from Hooksett. It splits from US 3 and follows Pinewood Road north along the eastern shore of the Suncook River before crossing into the town of Pembroke.
- US 3 enters alongside NH 28 in the village of Suncook at the southwestern corner of town from Hooksett. It is known as Allenstown Road through the Allenstown portion of Suncook before crossing the Suncook River into Pembroke.

== See also ==
- Bear Brook murders
- New Hampshire Historical Marker No. 193: Old Allenstown Meeting House / Meeting House Burying Ground
- New Hampshire Historical Marker No. 205: Bear Brook CCC Camp 1935–1942
- New Hampshire Historical Marker No. 211: Suncook Connection Bridge
- New Hampshire Historical Marker No. 230: Robert Frost in Allenstown / Buck Street Mills
