= Abbey of Saint-Marcel-lès-Chalon =

Monastery in Saône-et-Loire, France

Coordinates: 46.77°N 4.887°E

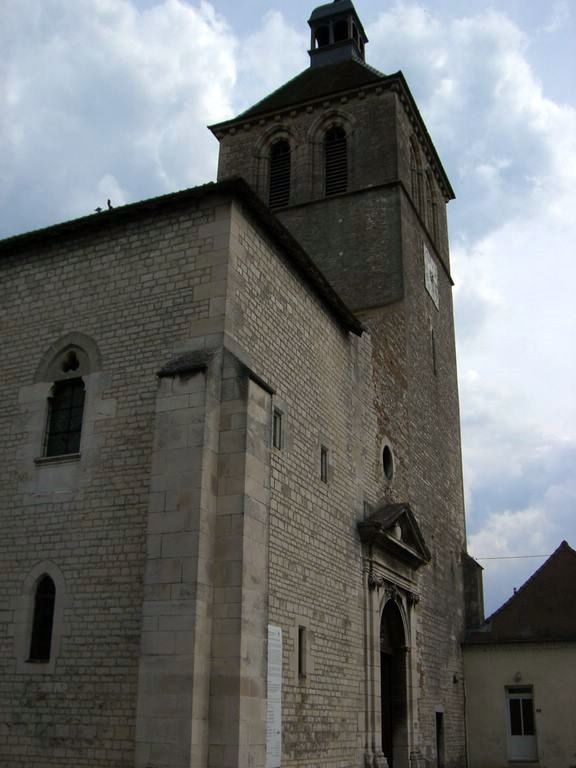
The church of the former abbey

The Priory of Saint-Marcel-lès-Chalon, earlier the Abbey of Saint-Marcel-lès-Chalon (French: Abbaye Saint-Marcel-lès-Chalon), was a monastery located in the present commune of Saint-Marcel near Chalon-sur-Saône, Saône-et-Loire, eastern France. It was founded in c. 590 as a Benedictine abbey. Somewhere between 979 and 988 it became part of the Congregation of Cluny, when it became a priory, like most Cluniac houses.

The philosopher Peter Abelard died here in 1142. The priory was suppressed during the French Revolution: the monastic buildings were demolished but the church survives as a parish church.
