= Canton of Saint-Rémy =

Canton of the Saône-et-Loire department, France

Coordinates: 46.77°N 4.83°E

The canton of Saint-Rémy is an administrative division of the Saône-et-Loire department, eastern France. It was created at the French canton reorganisation which came into effect in March 2015. Its seat is in Saint-Rémy.

It consists of the following communes:

1. La Charmée
2. Épervans
3. Lux
4. Marnay
5. Saint-Loup-de-Varennes
6. Saint-Marcel
7. Saint-Rémy
8. Sevrey
9. Varennes-le-Grand
