= Lux, Saône-et-Loire =

Lux
- Commune
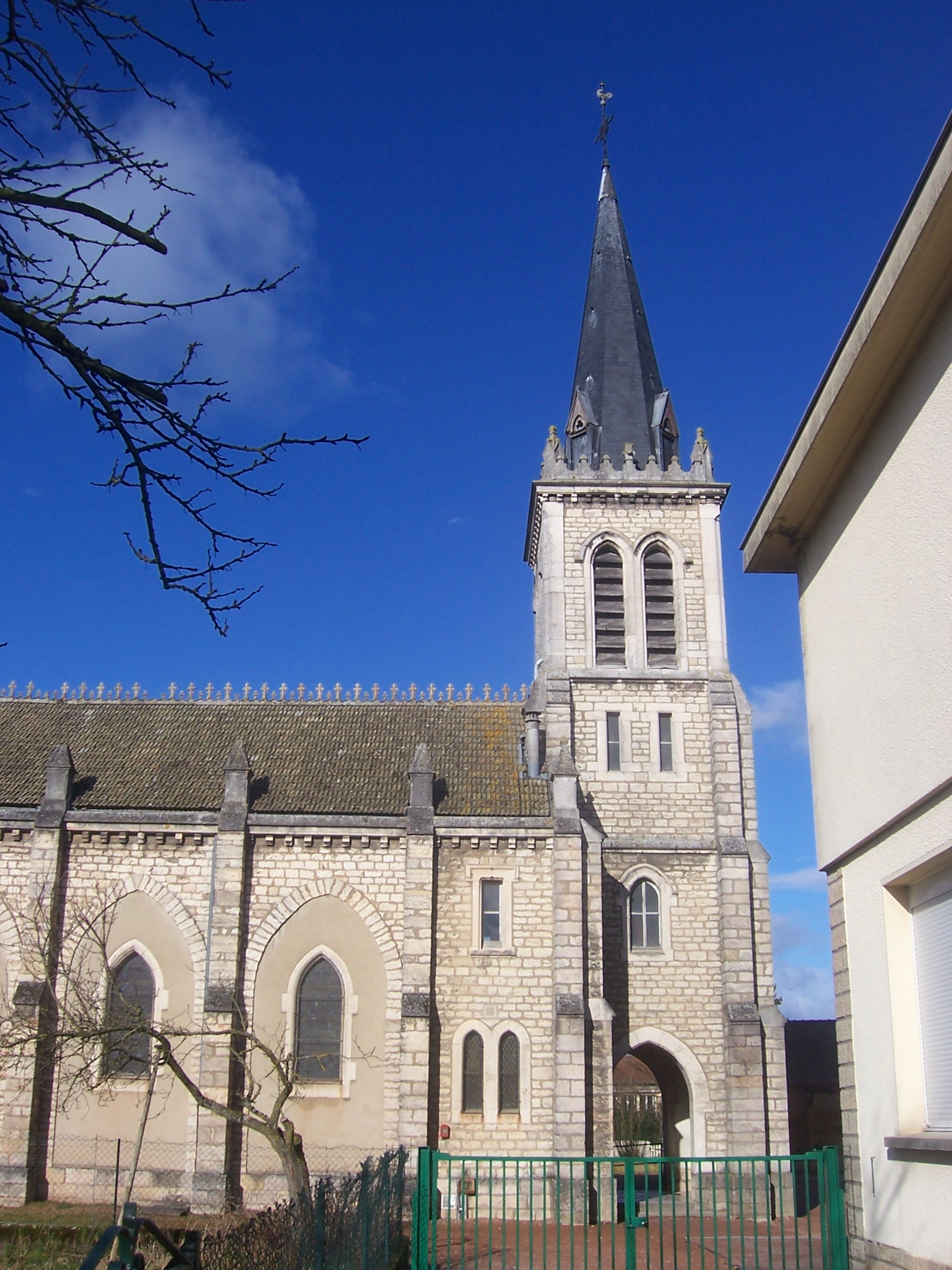
- The church in Lux
- Location of Lux
- Location within France Location within Bourgogne-Franche-Comté
- Coordinates: 46°45′18″N 4°50′50″E
- Country: France
- Region: Bourgogne-Franche-Comté
- Department: Saône-et-Loire
- Arrondissement: Chalon-sur-Saône
- Canton: Saint-Rémy
- Intercommunality: CA Le Grand Chalon

Government
  - Mayor (2020–2026): Stéphane Hugon
- Area^{1}: 6.18 km^{2} (2.39 sq mi)
- Elevation: 182 m (597 ft)
- Highest elevation: 191 m (627 ft)
- Lowest elevation: 172 m (564 ft)
- Population (2023): 1,885
  - Density: 305/km^{2} (790/sq mi)
- Time zone: UTC+01:00 (CET)
  - Summer (DST): UTC+02:00 (CEST)
- INSEE/Postal code: 71269 /71100
- ^{1} French Land Register data, which excludes lakes, ponds, glaciers > 1 km^{2} (0.386 sq mi or 247 acres) and river estuaries.

Lux (French pronunciation: [ly]) is a commune in the Saône-et-Loire department in the region of Bourgogne-Franche-Comté in eastern France.

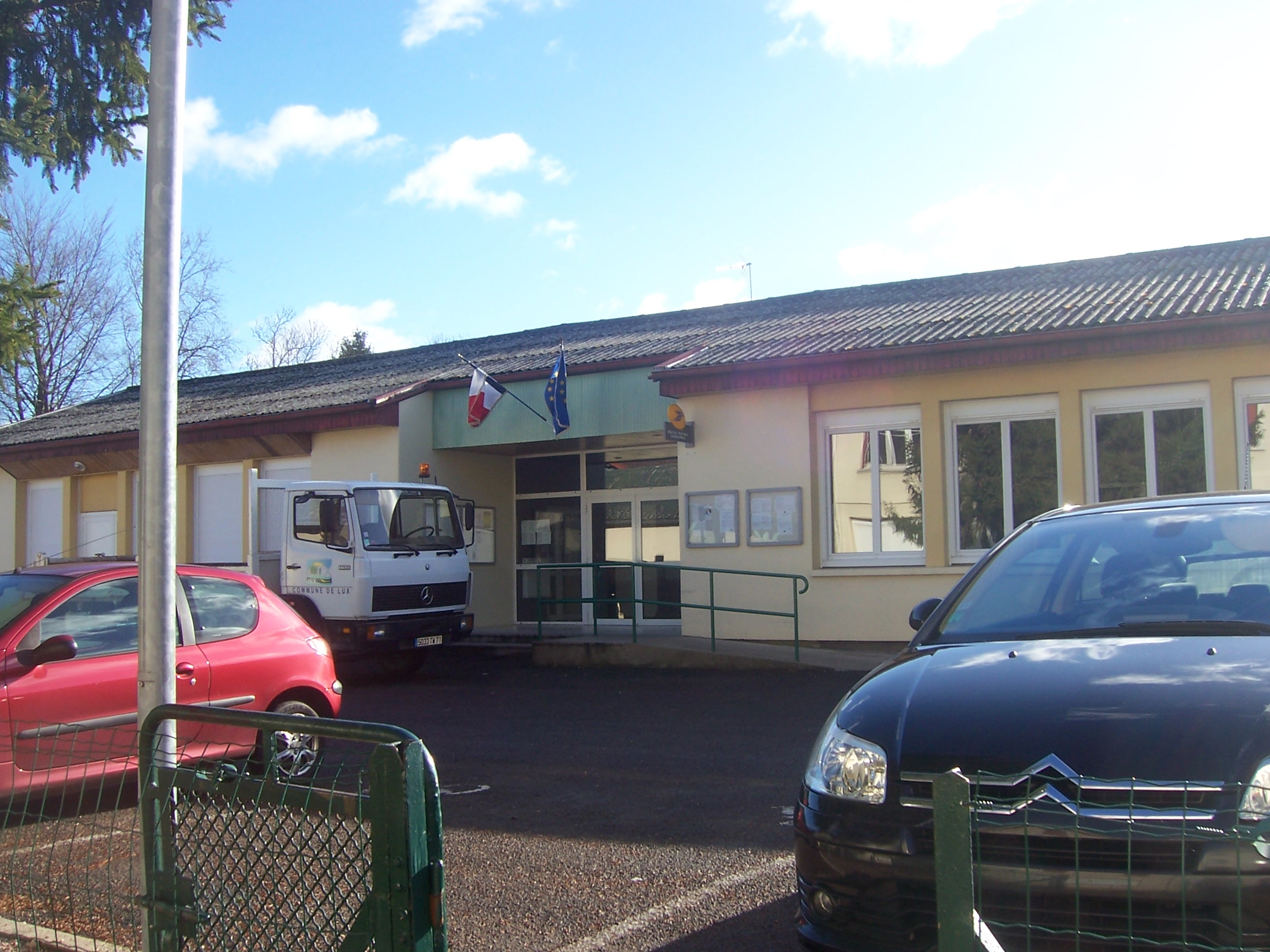
Town hall

== Population ==
Historical population
Year	Pop.	±% p.a.
1968	1,164	—
1975	1,391	+2.58%
1982	1,619	+2.19%
1990	1,619	+0.00%
1999	1,620	+0.01%
2007	1,673	+0.40%
2012	1,879	+2.35%
2017	2,011	+1.37%
2023	1,885	−1.07%
Source: INSEE

== See also ==
- Communes of the Saône-et-Loire department
