= Sevrey =

- Commune
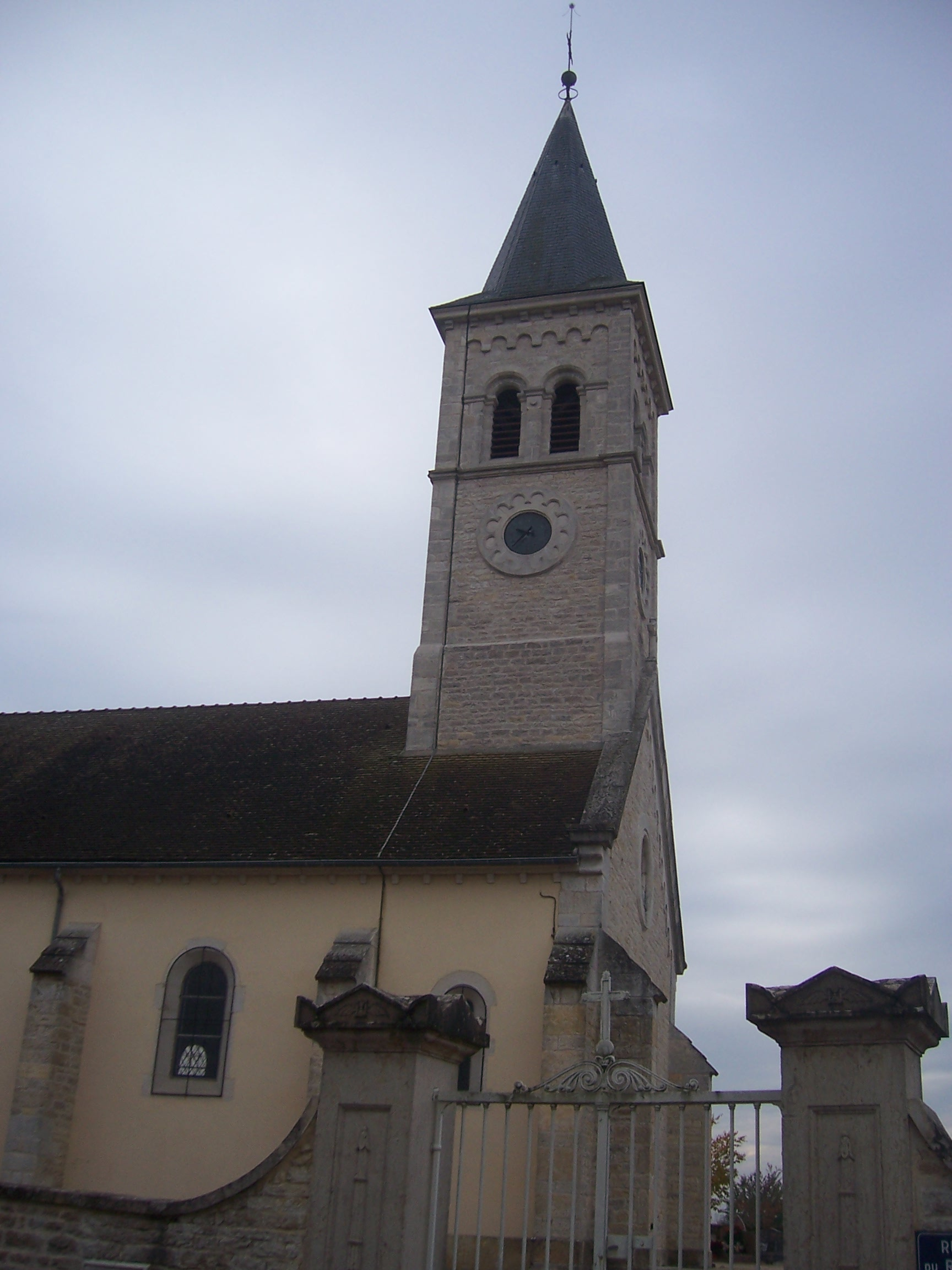
- The church in Sevrey
- Location of Sevrey
- Location within France Location within Bourgogne-Franche-Comté
- Coordinates: 46°44′21″N 4°50′28″E
- Country: France
- Region: Bourgogne-Franche-Comté
- Department: Saône-et-Loire
- Arrondissement: Chalon-sur-Saône
- Canton: Saint-Rémy
- Intercommunality: CA Le Grand Chalon

Government
  - Mayor (2023–2026): Patrick Bernardet
- Area^{1}: 8.44 km^{2} (3.26 sq mi)
- Elevation: 190 m (620 ft)
- Highest elevation: 205 m (673 ft)
- Lowest elevation: 174 m (571 ft)
- Population (2023): 1,201
  - Density: 142/km^{2} (369/sq mi)
- Time zone: UTC+01:00 (CET)
  - Summer (DST): UTC+02:00 (CEST)
- INSEE/Postal code: 71520 /71100
- ^{1} French Land Register data, which excludes lakes, ponds, glaciers > 1 km^{2} (0.386 sq mi or 247 acres) and river estuaries.

Sevrey is a commune in the Saône-et-Loire department in the region of Bourgogne-Franche-Comté in eastern France.

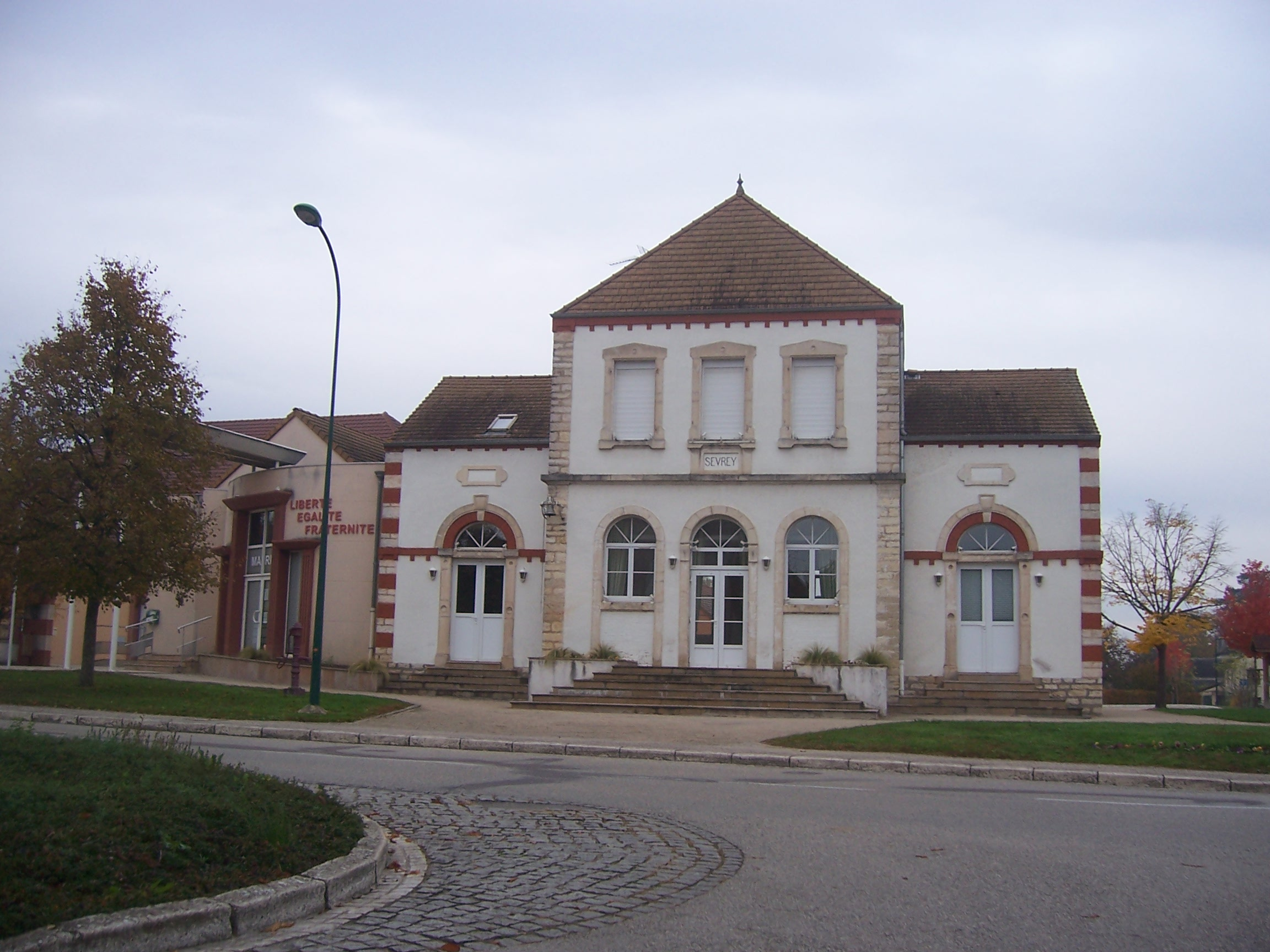
Town hall

== See also ==
- Communes of the Saône-et-Loire department
