= Solène Durand =

French footballer (born 1994)

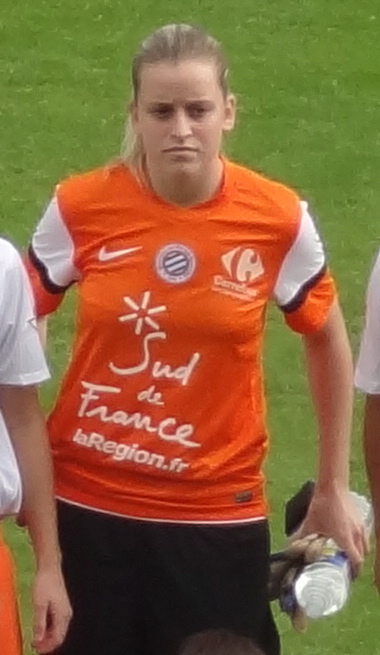

Personal information
- Full name: Solène Marie Reine Durand
- Date of birth: 20 November 1994 (age 32)
- Place of birth: Saint-Rémy, France
- Height: 1.71 m (5 ft 7 in)
- Position: Goalkeeper

Team information
- Current team: Montpellier
- Number: 16

Youth career
- 2008–2009: AS Châtenoy-le-Royal
- 2009–2013: Montpellier

Senior career*
Years	Team	Apps	(Gls)
2012–2017	Montpellier	33	(0)
2017–2021	Guingamp	82	(0)
2021–2022	Dijon	17	(0)
2022–2023	Guingamp	9	(0)
2023–2026	Sassuolo	43	(0)
2026–	Montpellier	0	(0)

International career
2010	France U16	1	(0)
2010–2011	France U17	13	(0)
2012–2013	France U19	12	(0)
2014	France U20	5	(0)
2020–2023	France	4	(0)
Medal record
Women's football
Representing France
UEFA Women's Nations League
Runner-up	2024
- * Club domestic league appearances and goals as of 10 July 2026

Solène Marie Reine Durand (born 20 November 1994) is a French professional footballer who plays as a goalkeeper for Première Ligue club Montpellier.

== Club career ==
Durand began her professional career at Montpellier HSC in 2009. She had previously played for Varennes-le-Grand (2000 to 2006) in Saône-et-Loire, before leaving for Chatenoy-le-Royal, where she played from 2006 to 2009.

In 2017, Durand joined Guingamp as the team's starting goalkeeper.

On 1 July 2023, Durand joined Sassuolo.

== International career ==
Durand was called up to the France squad for the 2019 FIFA Women's World Cup.

Durand was called up to the France squad for the 2023 FIFA Women's World Cup.

In July 2024, Durand was named in France's squad for the 2024 Olympics.

== Career statistics ==
=== International ===
As of match played 5 December 2023

Appearances and goals by national team and year
National team	Year	Apps	Goals
France	2020	1	0
France	2021	0	0
France	2022	1	0
France	2023	2	0
France	2024	0	0
Total		4	0
