= Saint-Marcel, Saône-et-Loire =

Saint-Marcel
- Commune
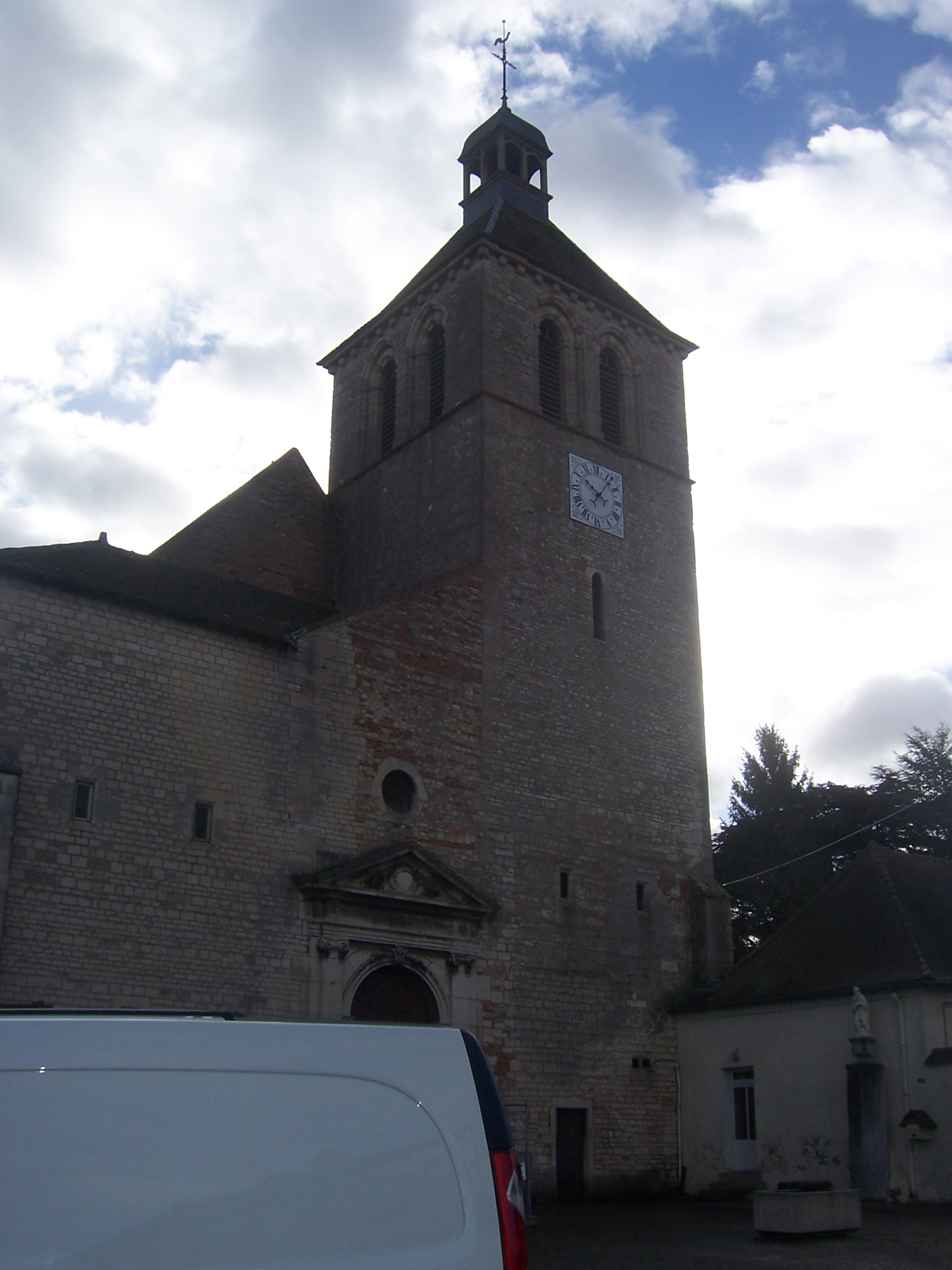
- The church in Saint-Marcel

- Coat of arms
- Location of Saint-Marcel
- Location within France Location within Bourgogne-Franche-Comté
- Coordinates: 46°46′35″N 4°53′24″E
- Country: France
- Region: Bourgogne-Franche-Comté
- Department: Saône-et-Loire
- Arrondissement: Chalon-sur-Saône
- Canton: Saint-Rémy
- Intercommunality: CA Le Grand Chalon

Government
  - Mayor (2020–2026): Raymond Burdin
- Area^{1}: 10.17 km^{2} (3.93 sq mi)
- Elevation: 181 m (594 ft)
- Highest elevation: 194 m (636 ft)
- Lowest elevation: 172 m (564 ft)
- Population (2023): 6,211
  - Density: 610.7/km^{2} (1,582/sq mi)
- Time zone: UTC+01:00 (CET)
  - Summer (DST): UTC+02:00 (CEST)
- INSEE/Postal code: 71445 /71380
- ^{1} French Land Register data, which excludes lakes, ponds, glaciers > 1 km^{2} (0.386 sq mi or 247 acres) and river estuaries.

Saint-Marcel is a commune in the Saône-et-Loire department in the region of Bourgogne-Franche-Comté in eastern France. Among its notable buildings is the Abbey of Saint-Marcel-lès-Chalon.

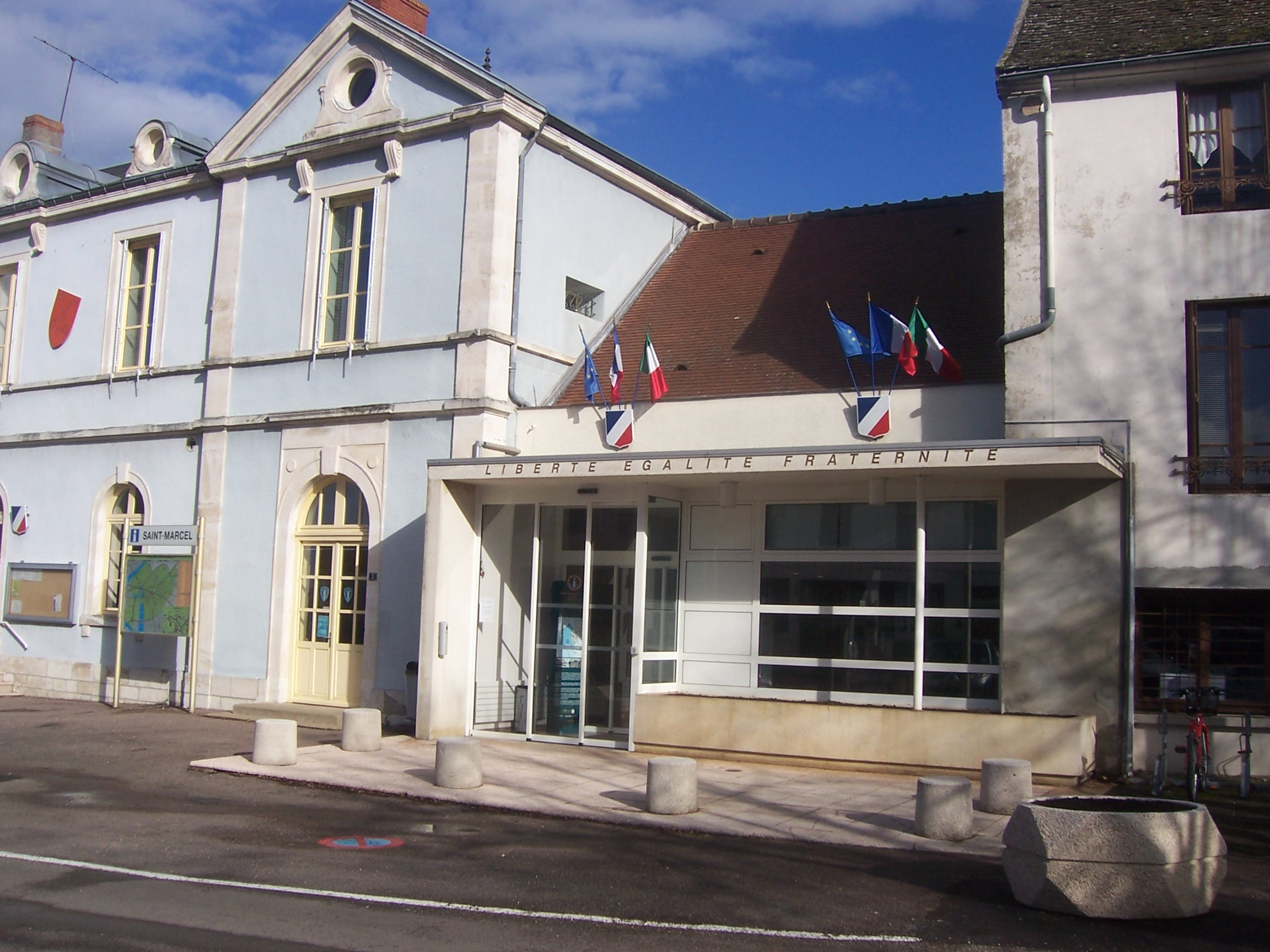
Town hall

== Population ==
Historical population
Year	Pop.	±% p.a.
1968	3,516	—
1975	4,253	+2.76%
1982	3,973	−0.97%
1990	4,118	+0.45%
1999	4,705	+1.49%
2007	5,669	+2.36%
2012	5,932	+0.91%
2017	6,049	+0.39%
2023	6,211	+0.44%
Source: INSEE

== See also ==
- Communes of the Saône-et-Loire department
