= Épervans =

- Commune
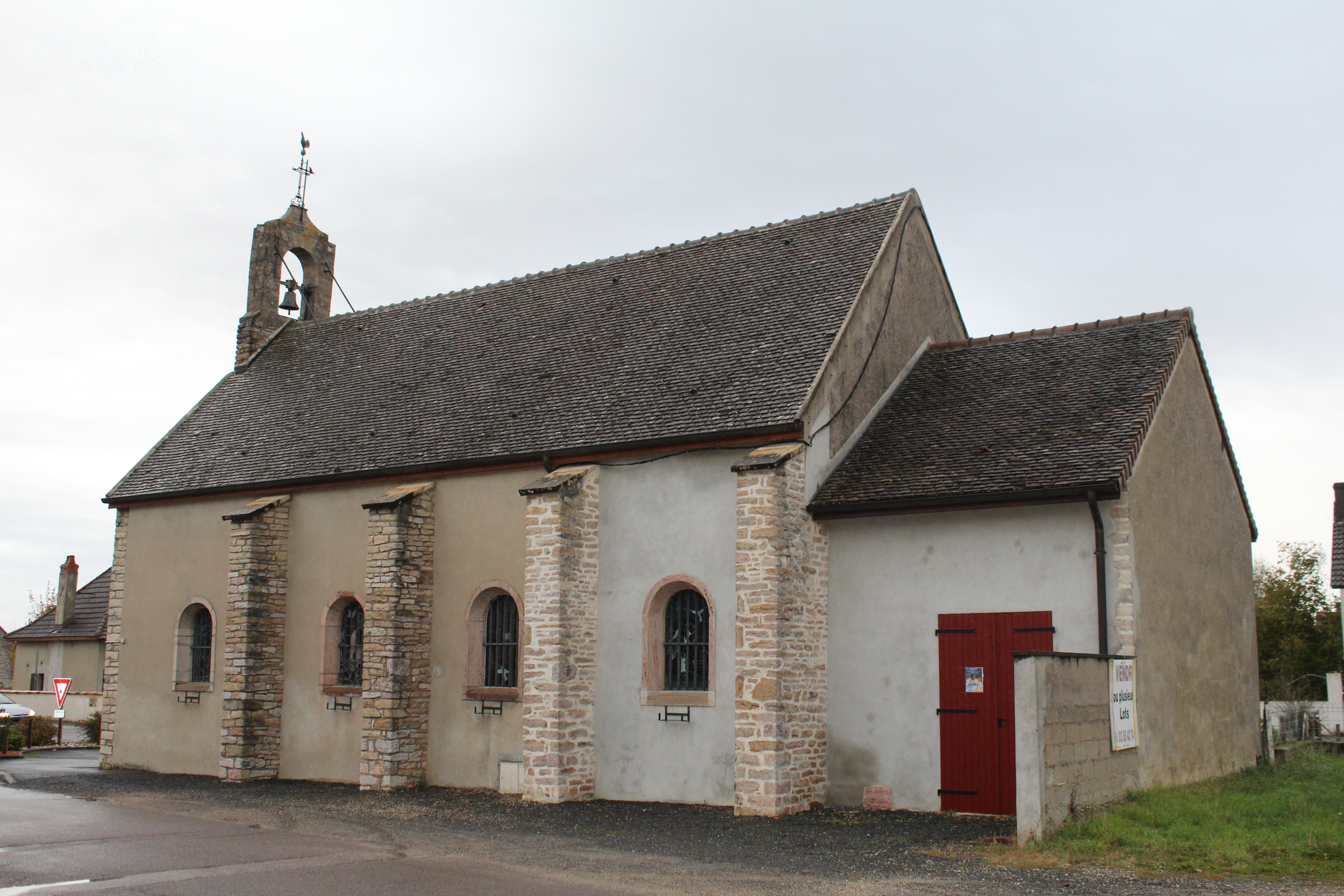
- The church in Épervans

- Coat of arms
- Location of Épervans
- Location within France Location within Bourgogne-Franche-Comté
- Coordinates: 46°45′05″N 4°54′10″E
- Country: France
- Region: Bourgogne-Franche-Comté
- Department: Saône-et-Loire
- Arrondissement: Chalon-sur-Saône
- Canton: Saint-Rémy
- Intercommunality: CA Le Grand Chalon

Government
  - Mayor (2024–2026): Patrick Pinard
- Area^{1}: 12.5 km^{2} (4.8 sq mi)
- Elevation: 181 m (594 ft)
- Highest elevation: 197 m (646 ft)
- Lowest elevation: 170 m (560 ft)
- Population (2023): 1,667
  - Density: 133/km^{2} (345/sq mi)
- Time zone: UTC+01:00 (CET)
  - Summer (DST): UTC+02:00 (CEST)
- INSEE/Postal code: 71189 /71380
- ^{1} French Land Register data, which excludes lakes, ponds, glaciers > 1 km^{2} (0.386 sq mi or 247 acres) and river estuaries.

Épervans (French pronunciation: [epɛʁvɑ̃]) is a commune in the Saône-et-Loire department in the region of Bourgogne-Franche-Comté in eastern France.

== See also ==
- Communes of the Saône-et-Loire department
