= La Charmée =

- Commune
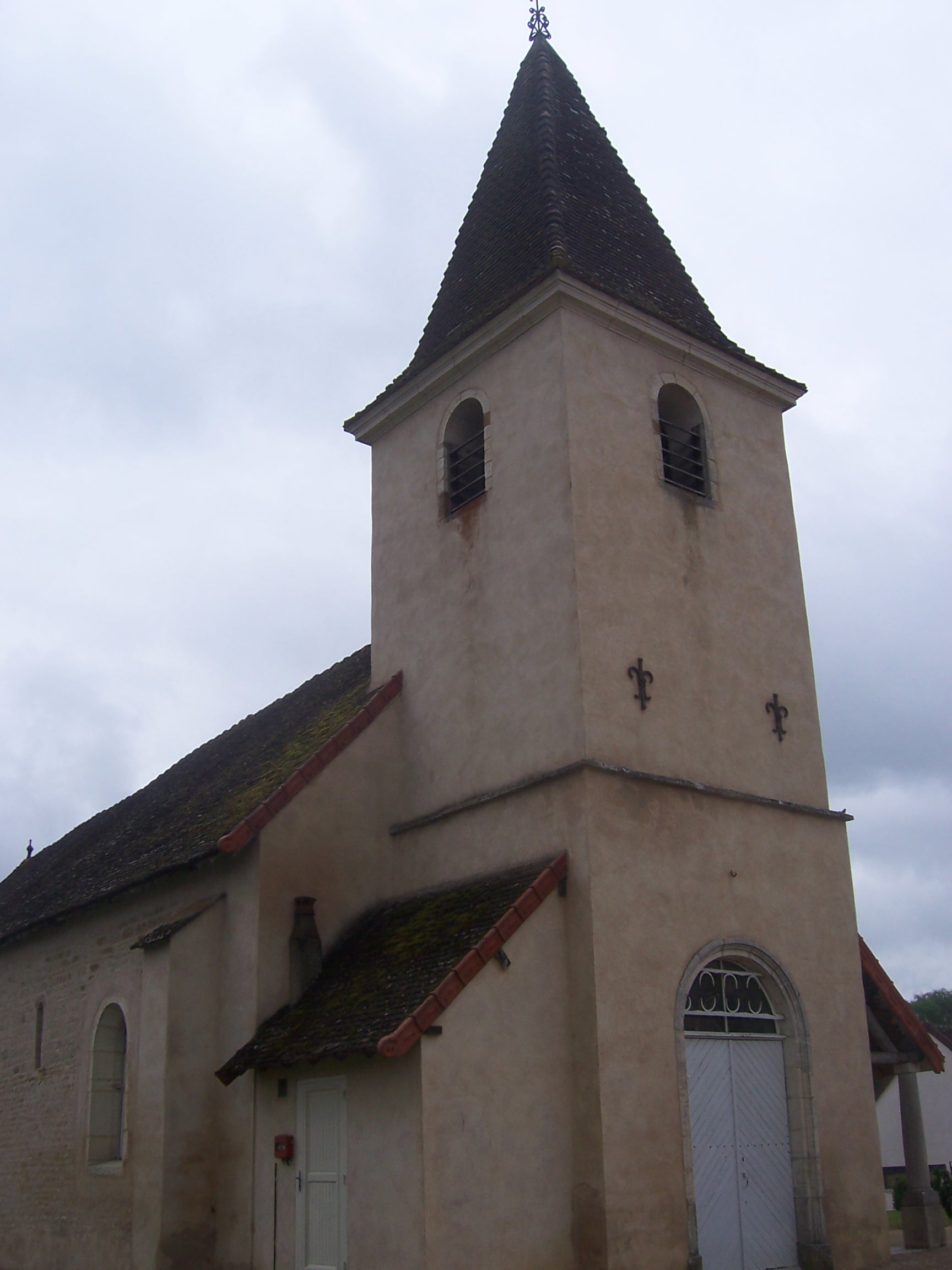
- The church in La Charmée
- Location of La Charmée
- Location within France Location within Bourgogne-Franche-Comté
- Coordinates: 46°43′13″N 4°47′41″E
- Country: France
- Region: Bourgogne-Franche-Comté
- Department: Saône-et-Loire
- Arrondissement: Chalon-sur-Saône
- Canton: Saint-Rémy
- Intercommunality: CA Le Grand Chalon
- Area^{1}: 13.95 km^{2} (5.39 sq mi)
- Elevation: 190 m (620 ft)
- Highest elevation: 206 m (676 ft)
- Lowest elevation: 178 m (584 ft)
- Population (2023): 681
  - Density: 48.8/km^{2} (126/sq mi)
- Time zone: UTC+01:00 (CET)
  - Summer (DST): UTC+02:00 (CEST)
- INSEE/Postal code: 71102 /71100
- ^{1} French Land Register data, which excludes lakes, ponds, glaciers > 1 km^{2} (0.386 sq mi or 247 acres) and river estuaries.

La Charmée (French pronunciation: [la ʃaʁme]) is a commune in the Saône-et-Loire department in the region of Bourgogne-Franche-Comté in eastern France.

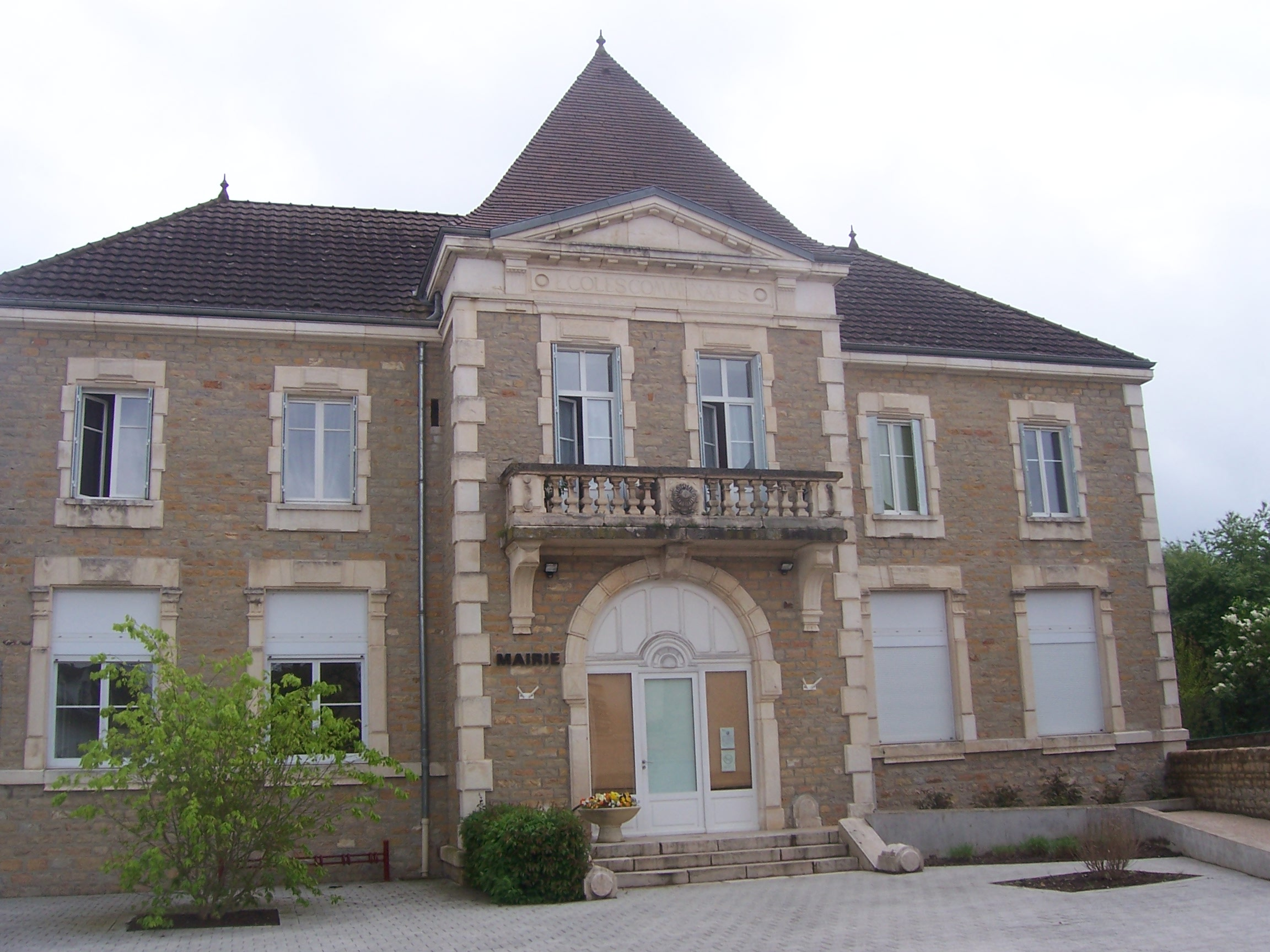
Town hall

== See also ==
- Communes of the Saône-et-Loire department
