= Saint-Rémy, Saône-et-Loire =

Saint-Rémy
- Commune
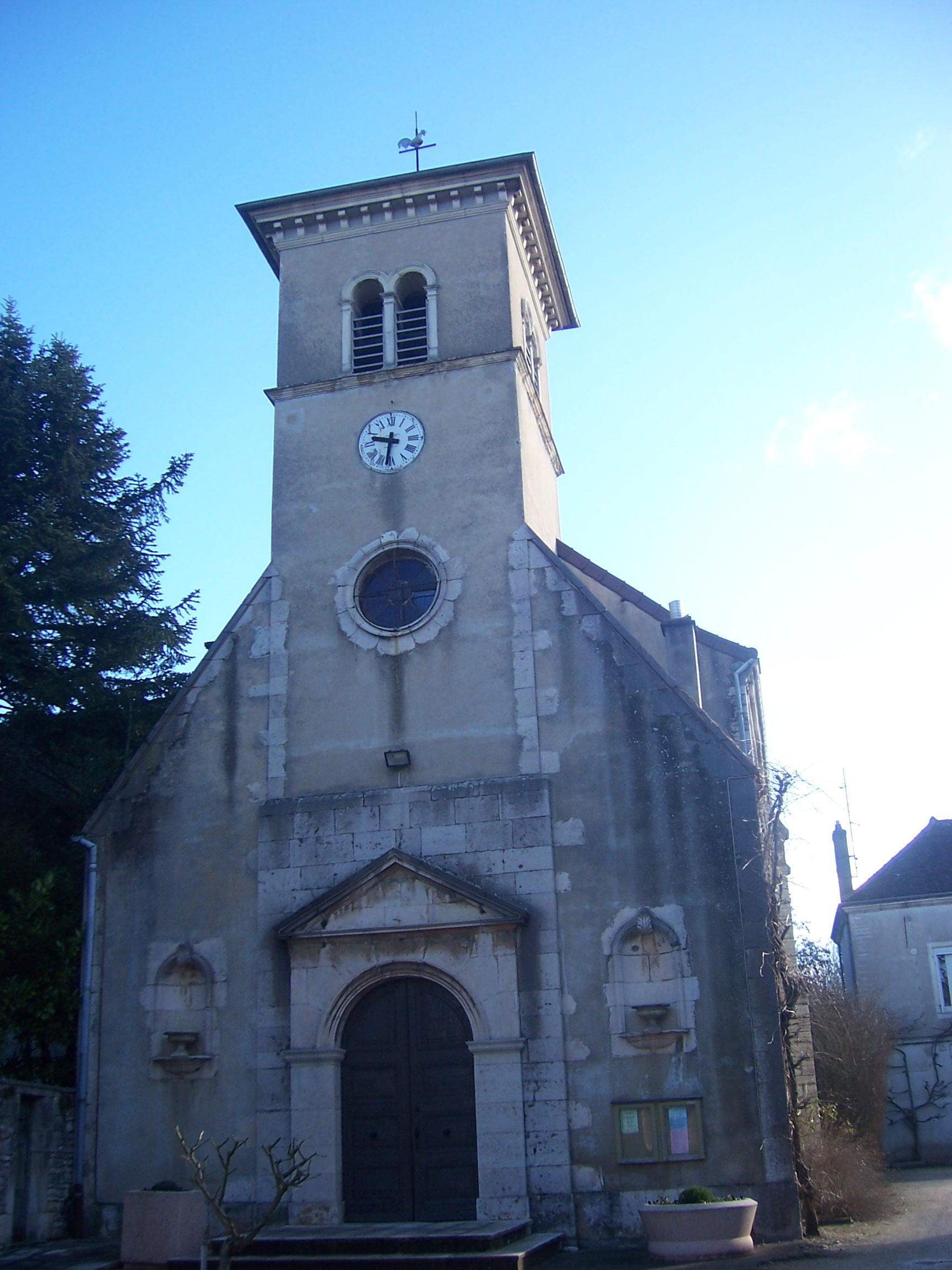
- The church in Saint-Rémy

- Coat of arms
- Location of Saint-Rémy
- Location within France Location within Bourgogne-Franche-Comté
- Coordinates: 46°45′50″N 4°50′18″E
- Country: France
- Region: Bourgogne-Franche-Comté
- Department: Saône-et-Loire
- Arrondissement: Chalon-sur-Saône
- Canton: Saint-Rémy
- Intercommunality: CA Le Grand Chalon

Government
  - Mayor (2020–2026): Florence Plissonnier
- Area^{1}: 10.38 km^{2} (4.01 sq mi)
- Elevation: 178 m (584 ft)
- Highest elevation: 206 m (676 ft)
- Lowest elevation: 173 m (568 ft)
- Population (2023): 6,410
  - Density: 618/km^{2} (1,600/sq mi)
- Time zone: UTC+01:00 (CET)
  - Summer (DST): UTC+02:00 (CEST)
- INSEE/Postal code: 71475 /71100
- ^{1} French Land Register data, which excludes lakes, ponds, glaciers > 1 km^{2} (0.386 sq mi or 247 acres) and river estuaries.

Saint-Rémy (French pronunciation: [sɛ̃ ʁemi]) is a commune in the Saône-et-Loire department in the region of Bourgogne-Franche-Comté in eastern France.

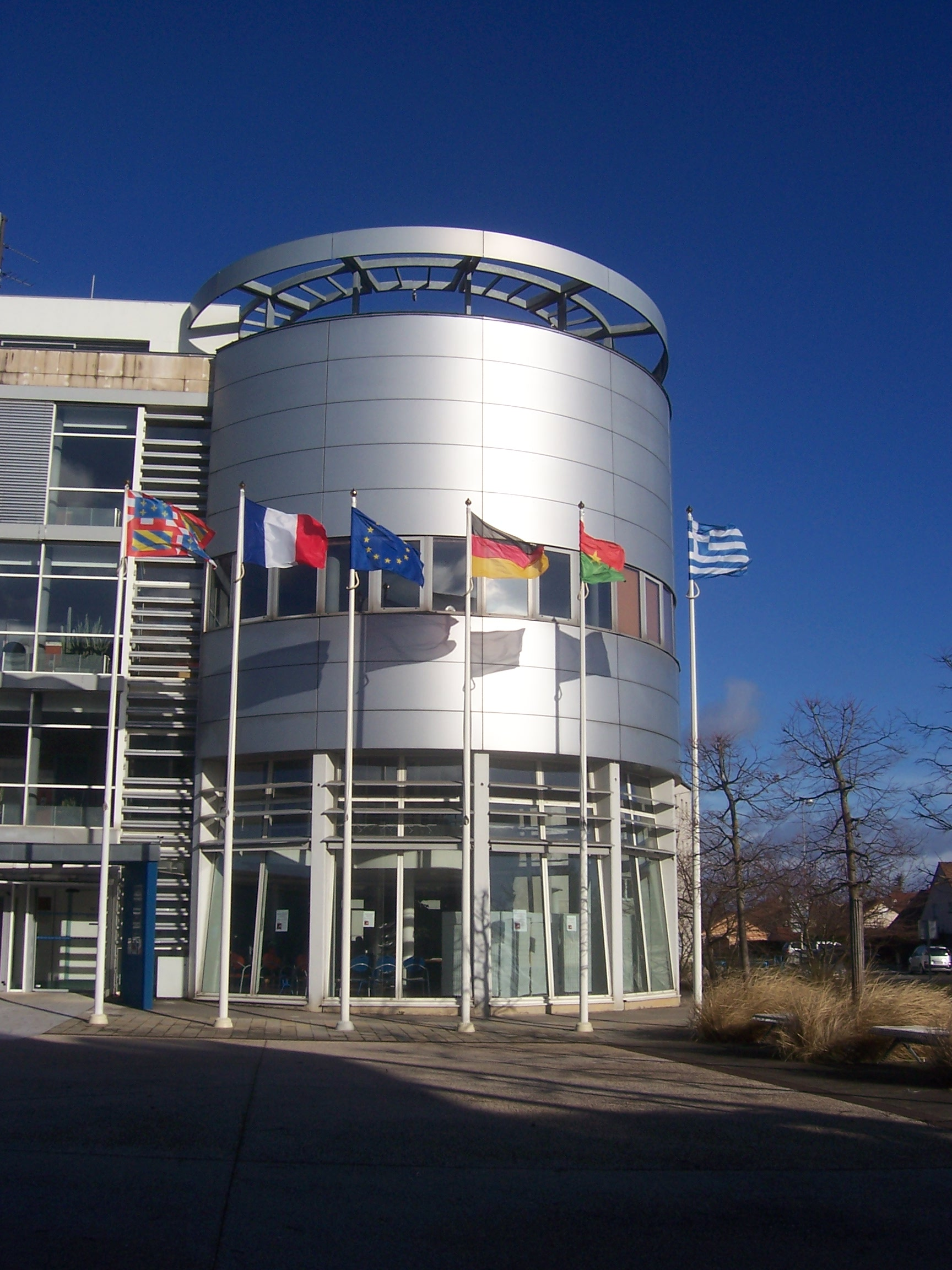
Town hall

== Population ==
Historical population
Year	Pop.	±% p.a.
1968	4,126	—
1975	4,926	+2.56%
1982	5,177	+0.71%
1990	5,627	+1.05%
1999	5,961	+0.64%
2007	5,805	−0.33%
2012	6,476	+2.21%
2017	6,639	+0.50%
2023	6,410	−0.58%
Source: INSEE

== Notable people ==
- Solène Durand (born 1994), footballer for France

== See also ==
- Communes of the Saône-et-Loire department
- Côte Chalonnaise
