= Varennes-le-Grand =

- Commune
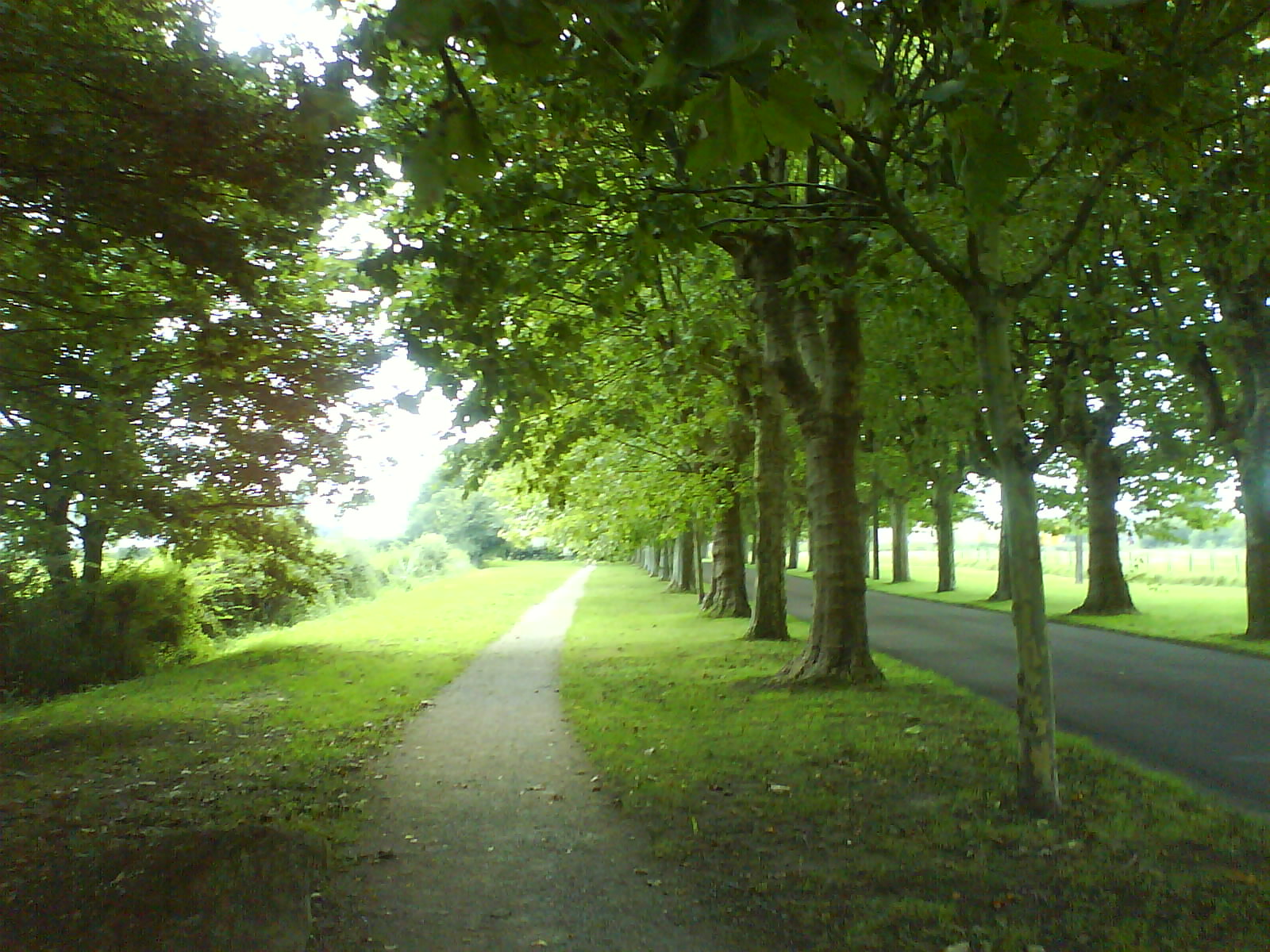
- An avenue in Varennes-le-Grand
- Location of Varennes-le-Grand
- Location within France Location within Bourgogne-Franche-Comté
- Coordinates: 46°42′44″N 4°52′41″E
- Country: France
- Region: Bourgogne-Franche-Comté
- Department: Saône-et-Loire
- Arrondissement: Chalon-sur-Saône
- Canton: Saint-Rémy
- Intercommunality: CA Le Grand Chalon

Government
  - Mayor (2020–2026): Éric Valentim
- Area^{1}: 19.08 km^{2} (7.37 sq mi)
- Elevation: 190 m (620 ft)
- Highest elevation: 206 m (676 ft)
- Lowest elevation: 172 m (564 ft)
- Population (2023): 2,293
  - Density: 120.2/km^{2} (311.3/sq mi)
- Time zone: UTC+01:00 (CET)
  - Summer (DST): UTC+02:00 (CEST)
- INSEE/Postal code: 71555 /71240
- ^{1} French Land Register data, which excludes lakes, ponds, glaciers > 1 km^{2} (0.386 sq mi or 247 acres) and river estuaries.

Varennes-le-Grand (French pronunciation: [vaʁɛn lə ɡʁɑ̃]) is a commune in the Saône-et-Loire department in the region of Bourgogne-Franche-Comté in eastern France.

== Geography ==
The Grosne forms most of the commune's southeastern border. The Saône forms the commune's northeastern border.

== Population ==
Historical population
Year	Pop.	±% p.a.
1968	993	—
1975	1,014	+0.30%
1982	1,181	+2.20%
1990	1,298	+1.19%
1999	2,058	+5.25%
2007	2,297	+1.38%
2012	2,267	−0.26%
2017	2,298	+0.27%
2023	2,293	−0.04%
Source: INSEE

== See also ==
- Communes of the Saône-et-Loire department
