= Crime in Oregon =

The rate of crime in Oregon, at least since 1985, has varied from below the United States national average to slightly above, depending on if one is looking at violent crime or property crime statistics. The violent crime rate remained below the national average every year between 1985 and 2022, while property crime generally remained above the average during that time. Every year between 2011 and 2020, Oregon maintained one of the 20 lowest violent crime rates in the United States. However, some of the most notorious serial killers in U.S. history were known for killing or operating in Oregon, including perhaps the most famous, Ted Bundy, as well as the second most prolific in terms of confirmed murders, Gary Ridgway, among many others.

== Crime statistics (1960–2009) ==
Reported cases of crime in the state of Oregon between 1960 and 2009:

Year	Population	Index	Violent	Property	Murder	Forcible rape	Robbery	Aggravated assault	Burglary	Larceny theft	Vehicle theft
1960	1,768,687	34,970	1,232	33,738	43	166	563	460	7,175	24,252	2,311
1961	1,799,000	36,000	1,242	34,758	48	138	626	430	7,276	24,983	2,499
1962	1,864,000	38,364	1,461	36,903	54	174	714	519	8,268	25,871	2,764
1963	1,826,000	40,362	1,393	38,969	55	161	554	623	8,823	27,023	3,123
1964	1,871,000	47,438	2,009	45,429	34	225	703	1,047	10,727	30,812	3,890
1965	1,899,000	52,376	2,290	50,086	65	226	873	1,126	12,079	34,161	3,846
1966	1,955,000	58,400	2,470	55,930	53	247	895	1,275	13,394	37,840	4,696
1967	1,999,000	69,268	3,147	66,121	61	248	1,317	1,521	17,140	43,515	5,466
1968	2,008,000	74,978	3,955	71,023	64	346	1,536	2,009	18,978	46,612	5,433
1969	2,032,000	85,543	4,527	81,016	81	371	1,760	2,315	22,853	51,692	6,471
1970	2,091,385	98,048	5,373	92,675	97	377	2,144	2,755	26,632	59,082	6,961
1971	2,158,000	106,601	6,335	100,266	70	478	2,383	3,404	28,933	63,543	7,790
1972	2,182,000	110,156	6,494	103,662	119	574	2,390	3,411	32,049	63,178	8,435
1973	2,225,000	117,860	6,512	111,348	110	653	2,211	3,538	35,772	66,494	9,082
1974	2,266,000	143,772	8,326	135,446	127	732	2,964	4,503	41,766	83,060	10,620
1975	2,288,000	154,491	10,034	144,457	142	745	2,982	6,165	43,738	90,053	10,666
1976	2,329,000	148,097	10,654	137,443	97	829	3,091	6,637	39,587	88,661	9,195
1977	2,376,000	142,256	10,830	131,426	117	948	2,948	6,817	38,880	83,306	9,240
1978	2,444,000	148,483	12,278	136,205	123	1,008	3,204	7,943	39,523	87,033	9,649
1979	2,527,000	161,045	13,781	147,264	107	1,121	3,299	9,254	40,682	96,823	9,759
1980	2,610,477	174,561	12,802	161,759	132	1,084	3,978	7,608	45,641	106,712	9,406
1981	2,647,000	186,267	12,671	173,596	117	1,105	4,780	6,669	52,067	112,518	9,011
1982	2,649,000	173,973	12,529	161,444	136	1,057	4,433	6,903	47,410	106,061	7,973
1983	2,662,000	166,398	12,986	153,412	109	1,078	4,533	7,266	46,472	98,880	8,060
1984	2,674,000	166,956	13,533	153,423	128	1,201	4,508	7,696	48,755	96,742	7,926
1985	2,687,000	180,830	14,807	166,023	125	1,363	4,986	8,333	50,690	105,725	9,608
1986	2,698,000	191,037	14,830	176,207	178	1,379	5,555	7,718	53,062	112,312	10,833
1987	2,724,000	189,835	14,697	175,138	153	1,247	5,338	7,959	48,562	113,907	12,669
1988	2,741,000	193,479	14,959	178,520	139	1,111	5,289	8,420	48,355	113,872	16,293
1989	2,820,000	173,744	14,625	159,119	134	1,314	4,282	8,895	40,197	103,690	15,232
1990	2,842,321	160,478	14,405	146,073	108	1,332	4,102	8,863	32,273	100,765	13,035
1991	2,922,000	168,165	14,795	153,370	133	1,561	4,387	8,714	34,363	105,145	13,862
1992	2,977,000	173,289	15,189	158,100	139	1,580	4,507	8,963	32,945	109,274	15,881
1993	3,032,000	174,812	15,254	159,558	140	1,554	3,930	9,630	31,072	110,878	17,608
1994	3,086,000	194,307	16,067	178,240	150	1,333	4,264	10,320	33,970	122,506	21,764
1995	3,141,000	206,173	16,408	189,765	129	1,309	4,332	10,638	34,640	133,075	22,050
1996	3,204,000	192,132	14,837	177,295	129	1,272	3,914	9,522	31,664	128,618	17,013
1997	3,243,000	203,328	14,412	188,916	95	1,306	3,811	9,200	33,507	136,129	19,280
1998	3,282,000	185,323	13,778	171,545	126	1,307	3,452	8,893	30,442	123,841	17,262
1999	3,316,154	165,866	12,432	153,434	88	1,219	2,858	8,267	26,749	113,052	13,633
2000	3,421,399	165,780	12,000	153,780	70	1,286	2,888	7,756	25,618	114,230	13,932
2001	3,473,441	175,174	10,650	164,524	84	1,174	2,749	6,643	26,648	123,034	14,842
2002	3,520,355	171,443	10,298	161,145	73	1,238	2,742	6,246	25,696	118,925	16,524
2003	3,564,330	180,369	10,506	169,863	68	1,218	2,847	6,373	28,562	122,327	18,974
2004	3,591,363	177,199	10,724	166,475	90	1,283	2,751	6,600	30,072	117,868	18,535
2005	3,638,871	170,643	10,444	160,199	80	1,266	2,478	6,620	27,621	113,316	19,262
2006	3,700,758	145,168	10,373	135,895	86	1,195	2,689	6,403	23,879	97,556	14,460
2007	3,747,455	142,920	10,777	132,143	73	1,255	2,862	6,587	22,821	94,773	14,549
2008	3,790,060	134,144	9,747	124,397	82	1,156	2,641	5,868	20,879	92,187	11,311
2009	3,825,657	123,255	9,744	113,511	85	1,168	2,461	6,030	19,377	84,265	9,869

== Capital punishment laws ==
The Oregon Constitution originally had no provision for a death penalty. A statute was enacted in 1864 allowing for the death penalty in cases of first degree murder. Authority to conduct executions was initially granted to local sheriffs, but in 1903, the Oregon Legislative Assembly passed a law requiring all executions to be conducted at the Oregon State Penitentiary in Salem, the first state prison in Oregon which opened in 1866.

Oregon voters amended the Constitution in 1914 to repeal the death penalty, with 50.04% of the vote. The repeal was an initiative of Governor Oswald West. The death penalty was restored, again by constitutional amendment, in 1920.

Initially, all executions were performed by hanging; lethal gas was adopted as the method after 1931.

Voters outlawed the death penalty in the general election of 1964, with 60% of the vote. Governor Mark Hatfield commuted the sentences of three death row inmates two days later.

== Notable cases ==
=== Criminals ===
Name	Lifespan	Crime(s)	Notes	Ref.
John Arthur Ackroyd	1949–2016	Murder	Convicted of the murder of Kaye Turner and a settlement was reached for the murder of his stepdaughter Rachanda Pickle. He is believed to have been involved in the disappearance of other girls and women, collectively called the Ghosts of Highway 20.	
Danford Balch	1811–1859	Murder	Convicted of murdering his son-in-law, Mortimer Stump, in 1859; was the first person executed by hanging in Portland.	
Ben Boloff	1893–1932	Criminal syndicalism	Soviet Russian communist sentenced to ten years imprisonment.	
Dallen Bounds	1971–1999	Serial murder	Born in Ashland, but did not commit any known murders in Oregon; convicted of murders in Washington, North and South Carolina	
Jerry Brudos	1939–2006	Serial murder, necrophilia	Committed multiple murders in Portland and Salem regions	
Ted Bundy	1946–1989	Serial murder, rape	Born in Vermont; confirmed to have abducted and murdered one female from the Oregon State University campus in 1974. Potentially responsible for additional unknown murders.	
Robert Lee Burns	1930–2002	Murder, robbery	Charged in 1963 robbery and murder of a police officer in California; subject of an extradition dispute between Oregon and California, but died before being extradited.	
Scott William Cox	1963–	Serial murder	Convicted of two homicides in Portland in 1993, and suspected in at least 20 others in the Pacific Northwest. Paroled in 2013.	
Diane Downs	1955–	Murder, attempted murder	Shot and killed daughter in rural Springfield; attempted to kill her two other children.	
Jim Elkins	1901–1968	Racketeering	Portland mobster and crime boss.	
John K. Giles	1895–1979	Murder	Convicted of murder in Oregon; escaped, and was later transferred to Alcatraz Island.	
George Hayford	1858–unknown	Forgery	Lawyer convicted of forgery in Oregon and California; falsely claimed to be Oregon Attorney General. Later arrested in Harlem, New York City and Washington, D.C.	
Keith Hunter Jesperson	1955–	Serial murder	Also known as the "Happy Face Killer"; committed at least two murders in Oregon, and is serving life sentence at Oregon State Penitentiary.	
Charity Lamb	c. 1818–1879	Murder	First woman convicted of murder in Oregon Territory.	
Richard Laurence Marquette	1932–	Serial murder	Convicted of murdering and dismembering three women in Portland in the 1960s and 1970s. He was the first person to be added as an eleventh name on the FBI Ten Most Wanted List.	
Harry Charles Moore	1941–1997	Murder	Second person executed in the state of Oregon since 1978 for murders of Thomas Lauri and Barbara Cunningham.	
Dayton Leroy Rogers	1953–	Serial murder	Murdered at least 6 women near Molalla between 1983 and 1987. Also known as the "Molalla Forest Killer."	
Ward Weaver III	1963–	Murder	Committed 2002 murders of Ashley Pond and Miranda Gaddis in Oregon City.	
Randall Woodfield	1950–	Serial murder, rape, robbery	Committed multiple crimes along Interstate 5 in Oregon, Washington, and California; estimated to have murdered over 44 people.	
Douglas Franklin Wright	1940–1996	Serial murder	First criminal executed by lethal injection in Oregon. Lured three homeless men to Warm Springs Indian Reservation and murdered them in 1993; confessed to the murder of fourth homeless man. Also committed double murder in 1969 in Portland.	
Jesse Lee Calhoun	1985–	Serial murder	Accused of killing six women in the Portland area between 2022 and 2023, he faces five counts of second-degree murder and four counts of abuse of a corpse. In 2026, he was indicted on a charge of first-degree manslaughter in the death of Elizabeth "Libby" Gibson, whose body was never found.	

=== Crimes ===
Year(s)	Incident / victim(s)	Location(s)	Notes	Ref.
1844	Murder of George LeBreton	Oregon City	Massachusetts-born pioneer and Oregon politician killed in the Cockstock Incident.	
1887	Hells Canyon Massacre	Hells Canyon	Massacre of thirty-four Chinese goldminers by members of a white horse gang.	
1895–1905	Sheepshooters' War	Crook County	Range war between cattle men and sheepherders. Resulted in the killing of over 10,000 sheep and several farmers.	
1911	Ardenwald axe murders	Ardenwald	William Hill, his wife Ruth, and their two children were found bludgeoned to death with an axe. Nathan Harvey, a landowner, was charged with their murders on December 20, 1911, but these charges were dropped after one week. In 1917, a man named William Riggin confessed to having participated in the murders, but provided significantly varied accounts that were inconsistent with one another.	
1924	Lava Lake murders	Deschutes National Forest	Triple-murder of three fur trappers near Big Lava Lake; one of the oldest unsolved murder cases in Oregon history.	
1946	Oak Grove Jane Doe	Oak Grove	Unidentified unsolved murder; victim discovered dismembered in the Willamette River over a six-month period.	
1949	Murder of Thelma Taylor	St. Johns	Teenage murder victim abducted and killed in St. Johns. Her killer, Morris Leland, was executed for her murder in 1953.	
1960	Murders of Larry Peyton and Beverly Allan	Portland	On the evening of November 26, 1960, Larry Ralph Peyton and his girlfriend, Beverly Ann Allan, disappeared, their bodies both being found dead within 3 months of each other. A witness identified as "Nikki Essex" accused brothers Edward and Carl Jorgensen of having committed the crime. Police also arrested a third man, Robert Gordon Brom. Carl was ultimately acquitted of first-degree murder, while Edward and Brom were both convicted of first-degree murder.	
1974	Cowden family murders	Copper	Family of four murdered while camping in the Siskiyou Mountains; murders remain unsolved.	
1974	Murder of Martha Morrison	Portland	Teenage murder victim who disappeared in Portland in 1974. Remains discovered in late 1974 in Vancouver, Washington, alongside another body. She remained unidentified until 2015, Warren Forrest was convicted of her murder on February 1, 2023.	
1981	Oregon Museum Tavern shooting	Salem	Shooting inside of the Oregon Museum Tavern, resulting in the deaths of 4 people and 18 injuries at the scene. Shooter Lawrence William Moore was subsequently found guilty of four counts of aggravated murder and sentenced to four life terms in prison. Victim Dennis Scharf died on January 19, 2013, due to complications from injuries he sustained in the shooting.	
1984	Rajneeshee bioterror attack	The Dalles	Followers of Bhagwan Shree Rajneesh deliberately contaminated various eateries with Salmonella, resulting in 751 infections and 45 hospitalizations.	
1988	Murder of Mulugeta Seraw	Portland	Ethiopian immigrant murdered by three white supremacists; Kenneth Murray Mieske, Kyle Brewster, and Steve Strasser were convicted of his murder in 1990.	
1989	Murder of Michael Francke	Salem	Director of the Oregon Department of Corrections, stabbed to death outside department building. Murder remains unsolved.	
1991	Disappearance of Thomas Gibson	Azalea	Disappearance of a 2 year old American child named Thomas Gibson who vanished from his front yard in Douglas County, Oregon. Larry Gibson, his father and a sheriff of the county, was convicted on manslaughter in March 1995, after his eldest daughter told law enforcement that she had witnessed her father beating Thomas outside on the day of his disappearance. He served less than one year before being released from jail. Thomas has never been found.	
1992	Murders of Hattie Mae Cohens and Brian Mock	Salem	Firebomb and murder of a lesbian woman and gay man by four white supremacist skinheads, one of whom was acquitted of all charges, the rest of them being convicted to between 25-35 years in prison.	
1994	Leathers Oil Company murders	Gresham	On the morning of January 17, 1994, a customer entered the Leathers Oil Company gas station and discovered the bodies of three employees, found executed. Suspect Tyrom Thies disappeared on February 9, 1994 and has not been seen since. His cousin Lawrence Benjamin Scherf, and friend, Lori Ann Stephens, were both convicted and served ten years in prison for their roles as accessories to the murders.	
1994	Gresham cat hostage taking incident	Gresham	Incident involving an emotionally disturbed 28-year-old woman named Janet Marilyn Smith, who took her own pet cat hostage in a Fred Meyer store in Gresham, Oregon. Police sprayed her in the face with three cans of pepper mace in an attempt to stop her. Smith cried out and then raised the knife above her head, subsequently being shot by a police officer, being pronounced dead at the scene. The public reacted angrily to the shooting with much criticism being directed at the Gresham Police department.	
1995	Murder of Yolanda Panek	Portland	Murder and disappearance of an American woman who vanished from the Capri Motel in Portland, Oregon on July 13, 1995. The day after she was last seen checking into the hotel, her locked car was found abandoned with her two-year-old son inside, alive. Her boyfriend and common-law husband, Abdur Rashid Al-Wadud, was convicted of her murder in March 1996.	
1995	Murders of Roxanne Ellis and Michelle Abdill	Medford	Hate crime murder of lesbian couple. Robert Acremant convicted of their murders and sentenced to death in 1996; sentence later reduced to life without parole.	
1998	1998 Thurston High School shooting	Springfield	On May 20, 1998, 15-year-old freshman student Kipland Kinkel killed his parents; a day later heading to Thurston High School and opening fire with a semi-automatic rifle in the cafeteria, killing 2 students and injuring 25 before students subdued him, leading to his arrest. Kinkel pled guilty to murder and attempted murder and was sentenced to 111 years in prison without the possibility of parole.	
2004	Murder of Brooke Wilberger	Corvallis	One of the most publicized murder investigations in Oregon history. Joel Patrick Courtney was convicted of her murder in 2009.	
2008	Woodburn bank bombing	Woodburn	Bank explosion in a West Coast Bank branch, which killed 2 police officers and seriously injured a third. Father and son Bruce and Joshua Turnidge were convicted of the bombing in 2011; both being sentenced to death row.	
2010	2010 Portland car bomb plot	Portland	Foiled terrorist plot to set off a car bomb in Pioneer Courthouse Square, Portland. Somali-American Mohamed Osman Mohamud was charged with attempted use of a weapon of mass destruction, and sentenced to 30 years.	
2012	Clackamas Town Center shooting	Clackamas	Mass shooting at the Clackamas Town Center shopping mall; resulting in three deaths (including the perpetrator; Jacob Tyler Roberts). Around 8,000-10,000 people were in the mall at the time, it is believed Roberts targeted random people and did not have a specific target in mind.	
2013	Death of Richard Swanson	Lincoln City	Richard Swanson was a 42-year-old man who tried to dribble a soccer ball from the city of Seattle, to São Paulo. On May 14, 2013, he died after being hit by a pickup truck alongside U.S. Route 101 just outside Lincoln City, Oregon. Prior to this incident, the driver had numerous traffic-related violations according to Oregon court records, the jury found the driver not guilty.	
2015	2015 Umpqua Community College shooting	Roseburg	Deadliest mass-shooting in Oregon history; Chris Harper-Mercer, a 26-year-old student who was enrolled at the school, fatally shot an assistant professor and eight students in a classroom. He injured eight others; while deliberately sparing a student's life so they could deliver a package from him to the police. After a brief shootout with Roseburg police, he committed suicide by shooting himself in the head with a weapon.	
2016	Occupation of the Malheur National Wildlife Refuge	Burns	Armed occupation by a militia group of the Malheur National Wildlife Refuge, leading to a month long stand off. Around 40 people occupied the refuge, by February 11, all of the militants had surrendered or withdrawn from the occupation, with several leaders having been arrested after leaving the site; one of them, Robert LaVoy Finicum, was shot and killed during an attempt to arrest him after he reached toward a handgun concealed in his coat pocket, more than two dozen of the militants were charged with federal offenses including conspiracy to obstruct federal officers, firearms violations, theft, and depredation of federal property.	
2016	Murder of Kaylee Sawyer	Bend	Kidnapping, sexual assault, and murder of a 23 year old woman by a college campus security guard, sentenced to life in prison in 2018.	
2016	Murder of Larnell Bruce	Gresham	Murder of a 19-year-old black teen named Larnell Bruce who was run over by a member of the European Kindred gang known as Russell Courtier, outside a 7-Eleven store in Gresham. Russell Courtier was sentenced to life with a minimum of 28 years, while his girlfriend Colleen Hunt received a 10-year sentence.	
2017	2017 Portland train attack	Portland	Train stabbing which resulted in the deaths of 2 men, and serious injuries to another. Perpetrator Jeremy Joseph Christian had threatened a conductor and attacked a black woman on a different train the previous day, he was sentenced to two consecutive life sentences in June 2020.	
2018	Murder of Daniel Brophy	Portland	On the morning of June 2, 2018, Daniel Brophy left for work at the Oregon Culinary Institute, where he was a teacher. Students arrived later and found his body in a kitchen, dead from two gunshots. The death was investigated as a homicide. His wife, Nancy Crampton-Brophy was arrested in connection with the murder, and was found guilty at trial of second-degree murder, being sentenced to life imprisonment with the possibility of parole after 25 years.	
2020	Killing of Aaron Danielson	Portland	Death of Aaron Danielson, an American supporter of the far-right group Patriot Prayer, by a far-left Army veteran named Michael Reinoehl after his participation in a caravan which drove through Portland and clashed with participants in the local George Floyd protests. Reinoehl had admitted to killing Danielson in an interview shortly before his death, claiming it was in self-defense; although police said that Reinoehl had followed and targeted Danielson. Reinoehl was killed nearby Lacey, Washington, outside an apartment in a residential street shortly after.	
2022	Normandale Park shooting	Portland	On February 19, 2022, Benjamin Jeffrey Smith confronted a group of armed protesters and told them to leave or he would shoot them, before pulling a .45 caliber handgun and firing at close range into a crowd of safety volunteers at the edge of Normandale Park in Portland, Oregon; murdering one, causing the paralysis of another from the shoulders down, and seriously injuring three others. Smith was arrested and charged with second-degree murder, four counts of attempted murder, and several assault charges in connection with the shooting. He plead guilty to all charges and was sentenced to life imprisonment.	
2022	2022 Bend, Oregon shooting	Bend	Mass shooting at a Safeway grocery store in Bend, Oregon. Perpetrator Ethan Blair Miller killed two men, one of whom was an employee who attempted to stop him, he wounded two other people before committing suicide. Miller had previously worked in a Safeway.	
