= 2024 Multnomah County District Attorney election =

- May 21, 2024
Candidate	Nathan Vasquez	Mike Schmidt
Party	Nonpartisan	Nonpartisan
Popular vote	100,873	87,679
Percentage	53.3%	46.3%
District Attorney before election
Mike Schmidt
Elected District Attorney
Nathan Vasquez

The 2024 Multnomah County District Attorney election was held on May 21, 2024, to elect the district attorney of Multnomah County, Oregon, which includes the state's largest city, Portland.

Senior deputy district attorney Nathan Vasquez defeated incumbent Mike Schmidt. Since Vasquez won a majority of the vote in this primary election, there was no general election for this office in November 2024. Schmidt's term in office continued to run through January 1, 2025.

== Background ==
Schmidt was elected in 2020 with 77% of the vote, despite his opponent receiving the incumbent's endorsement. He was appointed by governor Kate Brown to start his term earlier than expected, in order to replace Rod Underhill, who retired in the middle of his term.

Schmidt became known for his progressive policies.

On May 24, 2023, senior deputy district attorney Nathan Vasquez announced his intention to run in the 2024 election. He became known as the "tough on crime" candidate, receiving endorsements from public safety unions and prominent businessmen. He also received the endorsements of most of Portland's major newspapers. In January 2024, Schmidt announced his intention to run for re-election.

== Candidates ==
=== Declared ===
- Mike Schmidt, incumbent district attorney
- Nathan Vasquez, senior deputy district attorney

==== Endorsements ====
Mike Schmidt

Statewide officials

- Kate Brown, former Governor of Oregon
- Barbara Roberts, former Governor of Oregon
- Ellen Rosenblum, Oregon Attorney General

Local officials

- Jessica Vega Pederson, Multnomah County Chair

Organizations

- Safety & Justice Oregon
- Latino Network Action Fund

Newspapers

- Portland Mercury
- The Skanner
Nathan Vasquez

U.S. representatives

- Kurt Schrader, former U.S. Representative from Oregon's 5th congressional district (2009–2023)

State legislators

- Mark Hass, former member of the Oregon State Senate from the 14th district

Local officials

- Randy Lauer, Mayor of Troutdale
- Kevin Barton, Washington County District Attorney
- Tony Golik, Clark County (WA) District Attorney

Individuals

- Tim Boyle, CEO of Columbia Sportswear
- Lisa Schroeder, Owner of Mother's Bistro

Organizations

- Multnomah County Prosecuting Attorneys’ Association
- Portland Firefighters Union
- Gresham Police Officers’ Association
- Gresham Professional Firefighters’ IAFF Local 1062
- Multnomah County Deputy Sheriff’s Association
- Portland Police Association
- Portland Fire Fighters’ Association IAFF Local 43
- Port of Portland Police Employees Association

Newspapers

- Willamette Week
- The Oregonian

== Debates ==
2024 Multnomah County Attorney election debates
No.	Date	Host	Moderator	Link	Nonpartisan	Nonpartisan
Key: P Participant A Absent N Not invited I Invited W Withdrawn						
Key: P Participant A Absent N Not invited I Invited W Withdrawn					Mike Schmidt	Nathan Vasquez
1	Mar. 14, 2024	Portland Metro Chamber	Ken Boddie	YouTube	P	P
2	Apr. 2, 2024	City Club of Portland	Conrad Wilson	YouTube	P	P

== Results ==
Multnomah County District Attorney primary election, 2024
Party	Candidate	Votes	%
Nonpartisan	Nathan Vasquez	100,873	53.3%
Nonpartisan	Mike Schmidt	87,679	46.3%
Write-in		865	0.5%
Total votes		189,417	100%
