= Wapato Corrections Facility =

Building in Portland, Oregon, U.S.

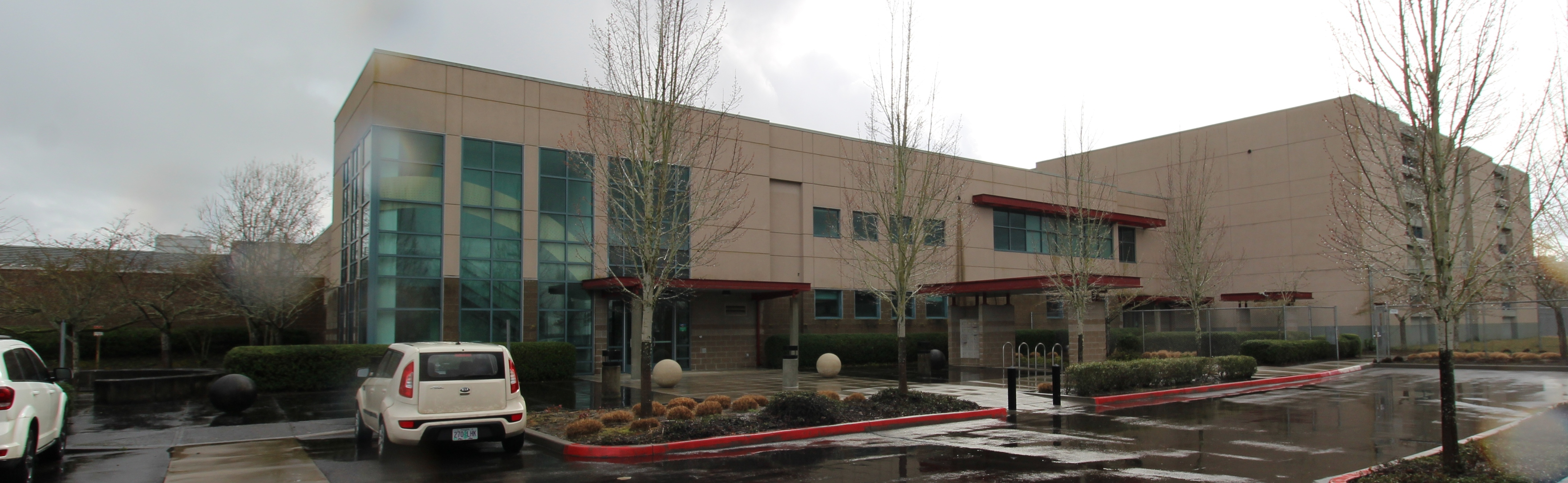

- Location within Oregon Location within the United States
- Location: Portland, Oregon, U.S.; 45.626°N 122.757°W
- Status: Closed (never opened)
- Security class: Minimum
- Capacity: 510
- Population: 0

Wapato Corrections Facility (also known as the Wapato Detention Facility, and colloquially Wapato Jail) is a building that was originally built as a Multnomah County jail in 2003 in the heavy industrial area of St. Johns neighborhood of Portland. It has never been put into service as a jail and was kept vacant until it was repurposed into the Bybee Lakes Hope Center, which opened in October 2020. It is the largest homeless shelter in Oregon.

== History ==
The Wapato Detention Facility was funded in 1996 by a bond measure defined by Multnomah County Commissioners in Resolution 96–122, and promoted by District Attorney at the time Mike Schrunk and law enforcement as a response to Measure 11. The facility, which cost $58 million, in the St.Johns neighborhood built by the Hoffman Construction Company has sat empty since construction halted in 2003. In March 2017, a California-based developer offered $10 million for the property. In November 2017 Multnomah County commissioners voted to sell Wapato to Kehoe Northwest Properties for $10.8 million. Later, Kehoe counter-offered $5 million which was accepted and it was sold to Kehoe for $5 million in April 2018. The proceeds from the sale of Wapato were then marked to be used to create permanent housing.

As of April 17, 2019, the property is owned by developer Jordan Schnitzer and is estimated to have a value of $8.7 million. Budget limitations prevented the county from opening the facility and it has never housed an inmate. It has only seen incidental use such as a location for television and movie shoots. It has since become infamous, being featured by media such as CNN's Anderson Cooper.

== Repurposing ==
The facility is located in the heavy industrial, aircraft landing zone overlay area. Previously land use regulations prevented its use as a homeless shelter.

In 2015 a petition was created online to refit the facility to house the homeless and in August 2016 Multnomah County Commissioner Loretta Smith also further supported the effort. After the sale of the jail to Jordan Schnitzer he also received offers to convert Wapato to a homeless shelter and rejected them because of "cost and distance from other public services".

In April 2019, a proposal was made by Kay Toran, who has been the president of Oregon Volunteers of America since 1999, to create a residential treatment program at the facility for adults experiencing addiction and mental health problems. The proposal received support from Schnitzer who called it "fabulous". Before the proposal, Schnitzer had considered using the site as a warehouse for one of his businesses, Harsch Investment Properties. Toran says that if the plan does not receive funding support in the next few years it would likely not be doable.

In October 2019, Schnitzer announced that the plans to convert the facility into a community wellness center to serve the local homeless population had fallen flat. He cited low funding for renovation and a lack of support from elected officials and homeless advocacy organizations in drawing this conclusion. As such, he said, the facility would likely be demolished by the end of 2019.

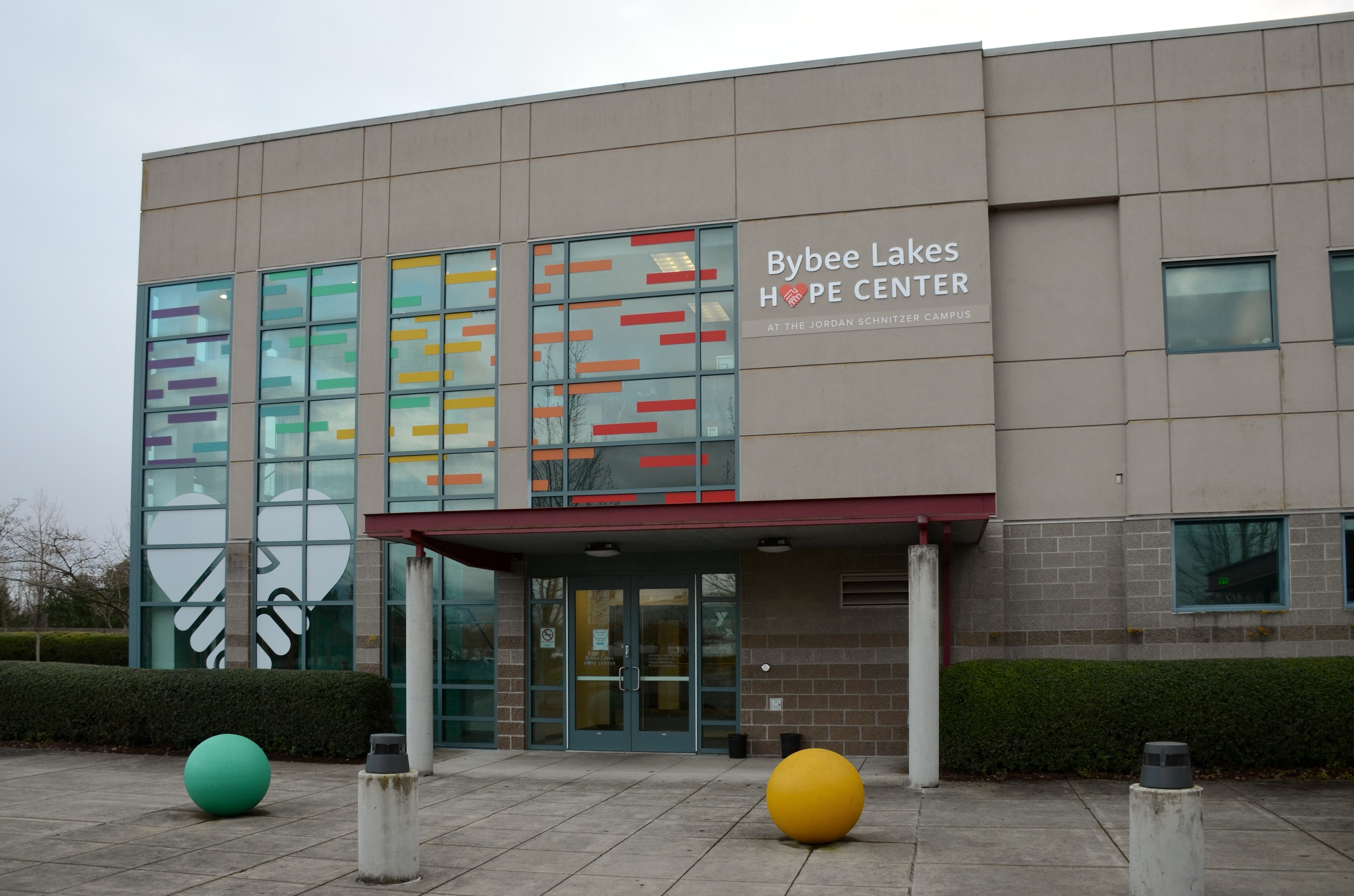
The building in 2024, in use as the Bybee Lakes Hope Center shelter

In February 2020, Wapato jail was on track to be renovated into a 228-bed homeless facility with expected opening of September 2020. By then, $4 million in funds had been raised, enough to operate for two years without any structural changes. In May 2020, the building's owner signed a lease with Bybee Lakes Hope Center for this purpose.

In March 2020 during the COVID-19 pandemic, the building's owner Jordan Schnitzer and the Oregon Health Authority discussed about potentially using the facility as a treatment center for COVID-19 Coronavirus patients in need of in-patient care, but do not need ICU care.

Wapato facility was dedicated as a homeless shelter on August 12, 2020 and it has been in operation since October 2, 2020 with 80 beds, with plans to add approximately 400 beds in December for long-term housing.

Oregon state senators Lew Frederick, Betsy Johnson, Elizabeth Steiner Hayward, and Portland Police Union president Daryl Turner sit on the advisory board of Bybee Lakes Hope Center.

Helping Hands Reentry Outreach Center, which oversees 11 shelters throughout Oregon including the Bybee Lakes Hope Center ceased new admissions into this shelter on August 14, 2023 citing funding uncertainties. The facility was in danger of having to close in September 2023 when Multnomah County approved an emergency grant of $1.5 million in early September, and another of $1.25 million in late September, to keep it operating through at least the end of the year.

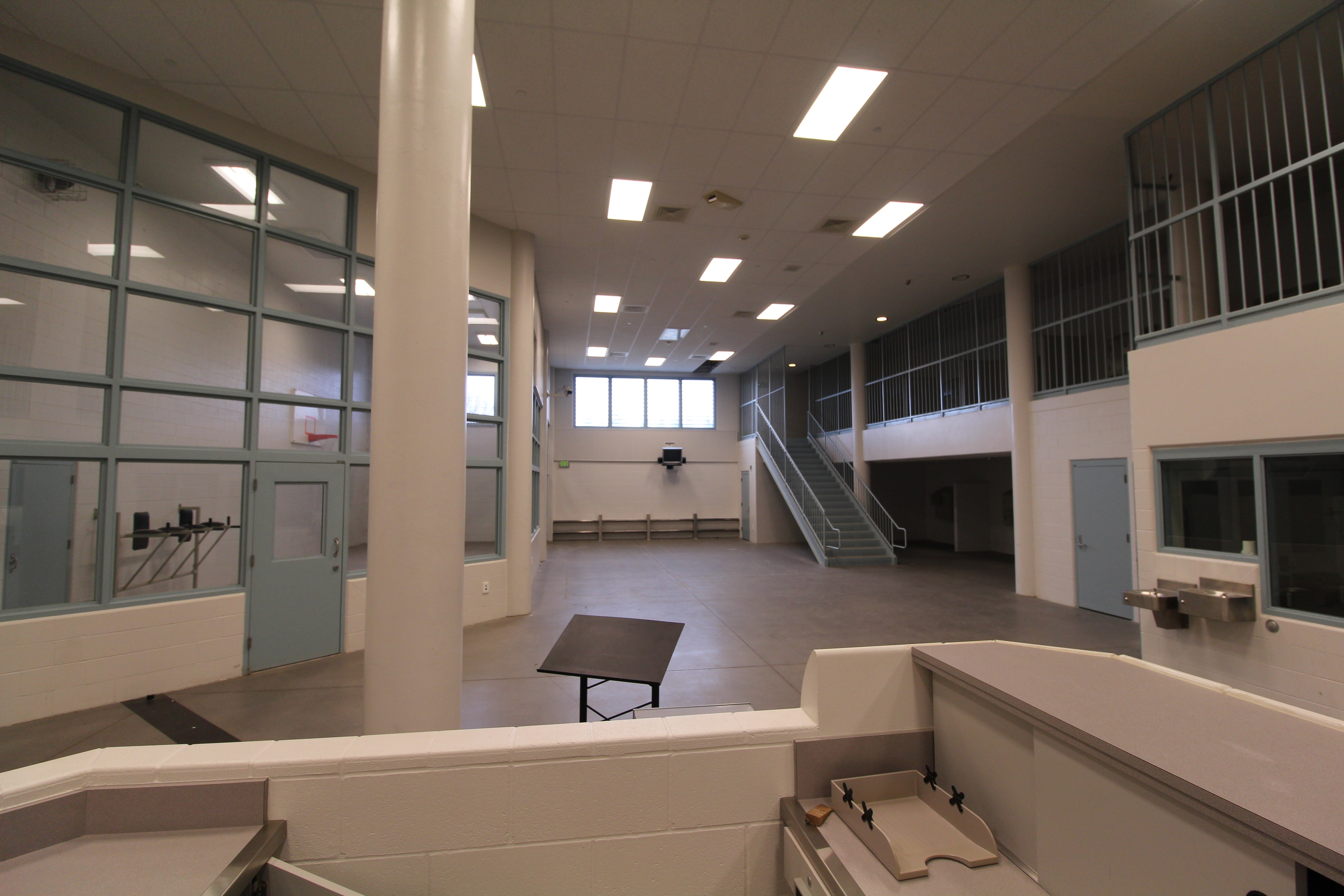
Inside the facility during a tour in December, 2019

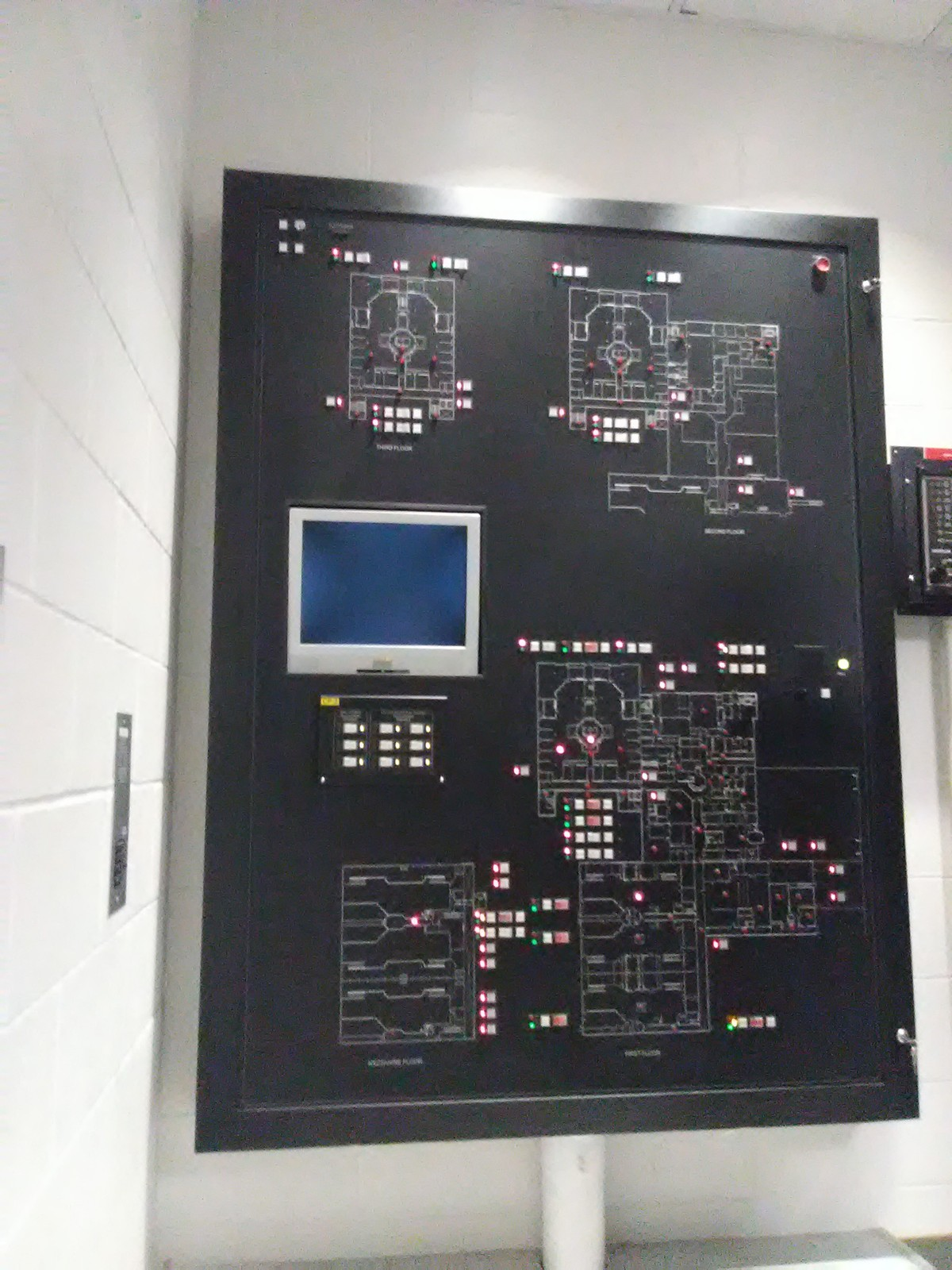
Alarm indicator panel

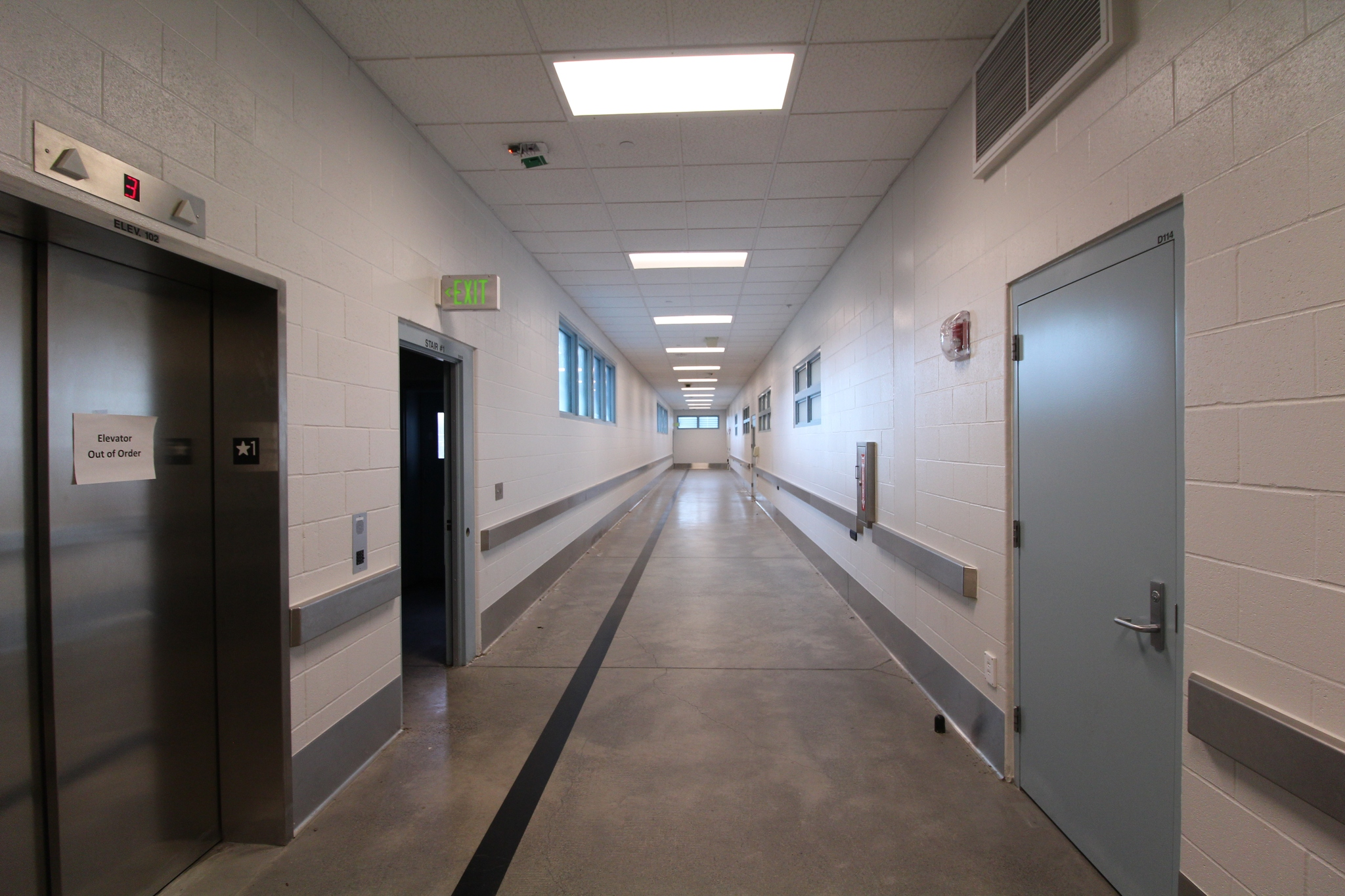
Wapato Jail corridor

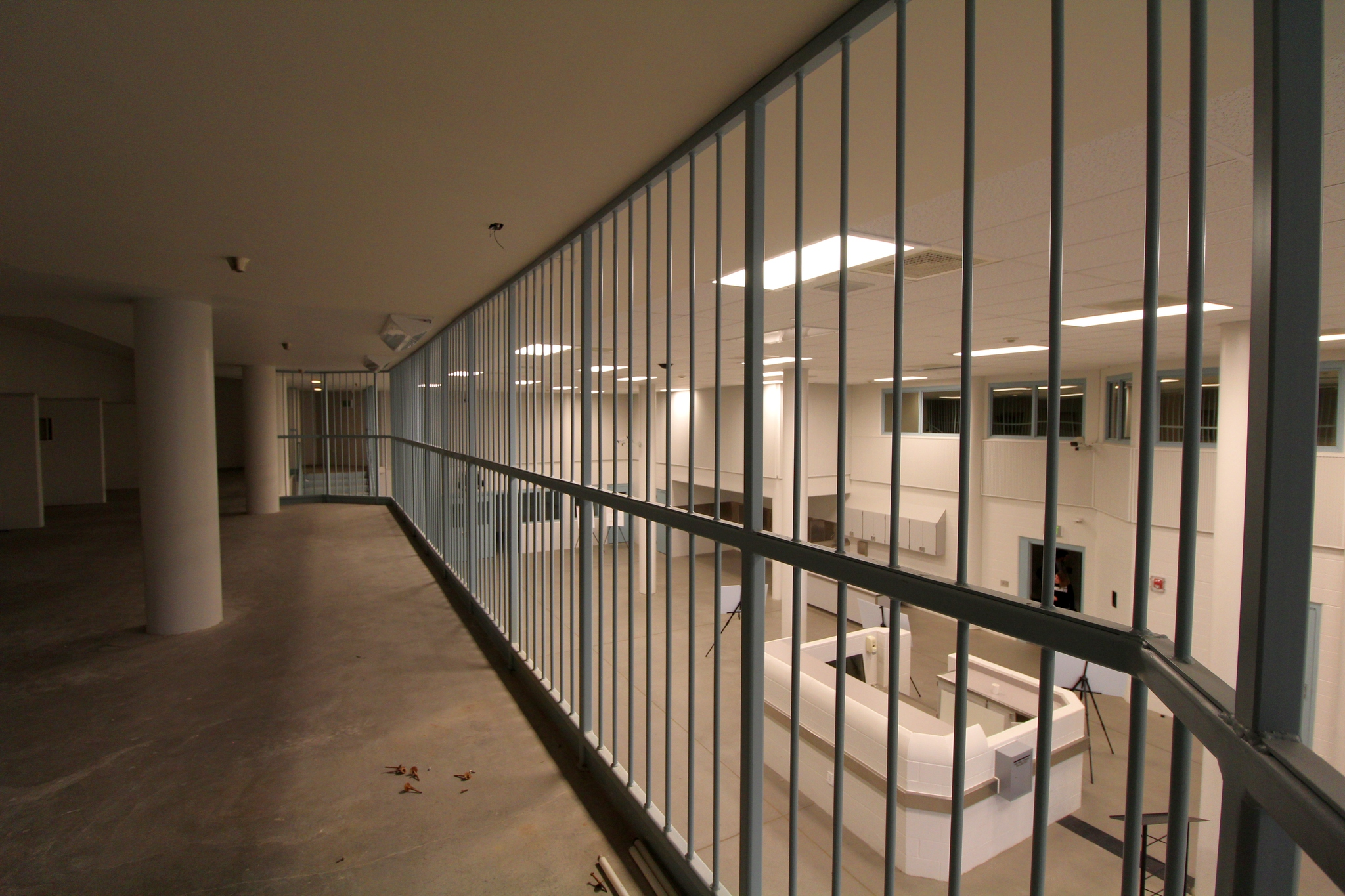
Wapato Correctional Facility upper floor
