= Multnomah County Circuit Court =

Circuit court of Multnomah County, Oregon

The Multnomah County Circuit Court, which composes the 4th Judicial District of the Oregon Circuit Court system, is the general jurisdiction trial court of Multnomah County, Oregon. Judith Matarazzo is the presiding judge of the Court, serving with 37 others. The chief prosecutor is Multnomah County District Attorney Nathan Vasquez.

The four court locations are

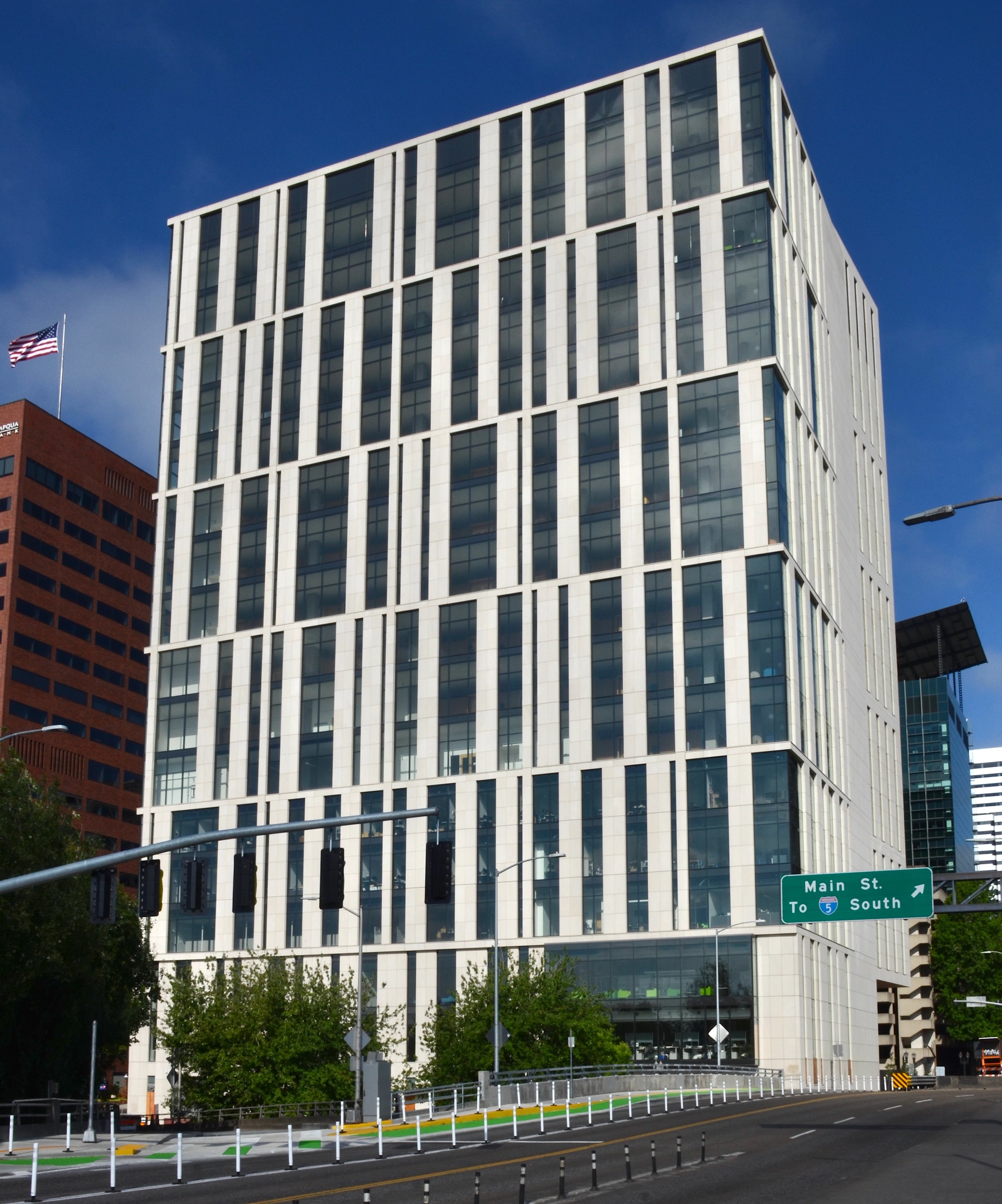
The Multnomah County Courthouse in 2021

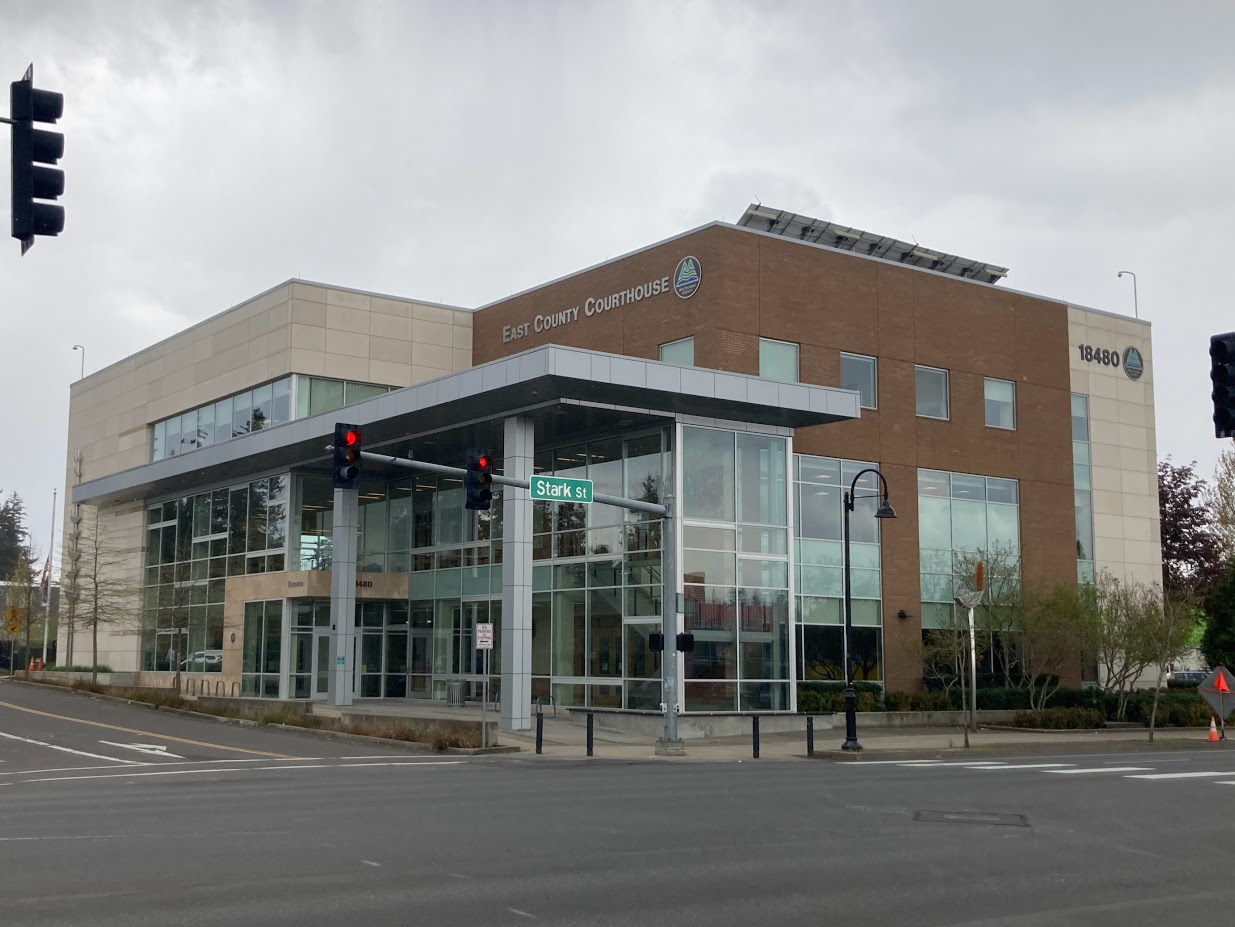
East County Courthouse building in 2022

- Multnomah County Courthouse (Central Courthouse), located at 1200 SW 1st Ave, Portland
- Justice Center, located on the third floor of the County Jail / Police HQ building, 1120 SW 3rd Ave, Portland
- Juvenile Justice Center, 1401 NE 68th Ave, Portland
- East County Courthouse, 18480 SE Stark St, Portland

== Judiciary ==
As of August 2023, the following are currently serving judges in the Circuit Court:

Criminal and civil judges
- Judith Matarazzo, Presiding Judge
- Cheryl Albrecht, Chief Criminal Judge
- Christopher Marshall, Chief Civil Court Judge
- Steffan Alexander
- Amy Baggio
- Eric Bloch
- Leslie Bottomly
- Adrian Brown
- Eric Dahlin
- Bryan Francesconi
- Rima Ghandour
- Michael Greenlick
- Celia Howes
- Andrew Lavin
- Angela Lucero
- Heidi Moawad
- Melvin Oden-Orr
- Jenna Plank
- Christopher Ramras
- David Rees
- Shelley Russell
- Thomas Ryan
- Chanpone Sinlapasai
- Kelly Skye
- Benjamin Souede
- Katharine von Ter Stegge
- Nan Waller

Family and juvenile judges

- Patrick Henry, Chief Probate Judge
- Susan Svetkey, Chief Family Court Judge
- Jacqueline Alarcón
- Maurisa Gates
- Amy Holmes Hehn
- Morgan Long
- Michael Loy
- Patricia McGuire
- Susan Svetkey
- Xiomara Torres
- Francis Troy
- Kathryn Villa-Smith

== List of District Attorneys ==
State's attorney	Term in office	Notes
John M. Gearin	1884–1886	
Unknown	1886–1900	
George E. Chamberlain	1900–1903	Resigned. Elected Governor in 1902.
Unknown	1903–1931	
William Langley	1954–1957	Removed from office by Judge Frank J. Lonergan after being found guilty by a jury for refusing to prosecute gambling.
F. Leo Smith	1957–1958	Appointed in 1957. Did not seek re-election.
Unknown	1958–1962	
George Van Hoomissen		Did not seek re-election. Ran for Secretary of State instead (lost).
Harl H. Haas Jr.	1972–1981	Did not seek re-election. Ran for Attorney General instead (lost).
Mike Schrunk	1981–2012	Longest serving District Attorney in county's history
Rod Underhill	2012–2020	Resigned in 2020
Mike Schmidt	2020–2025	Appointed in 2020 Elected in 2020
Nathan Vasquez	2025–present	Elected in 2024

== Architecture ==
The new Multnomah County Courthouse on SW 1st Ave opened October 2020. The 17-story building spans 450,000 square feet and cost $324 million. SRG Partnership was the lead architect, and Hoffman Construction Company lead contractor, both Portland based.

The previous building, a century-old courthouse, was added to the National Register of Historic Places in 1979. It was sold in 2018 to NBP Capital for $28 million, who said it was "considering various creative uses" that would preserve the historic building. The county assessor valued it at $40 million, but estimated necessary upgrades for earthquake resistance at $70 million.
