= 2020 Multnomah County District Attorney election =

- May 19, 2020
- Turnout: 230,000
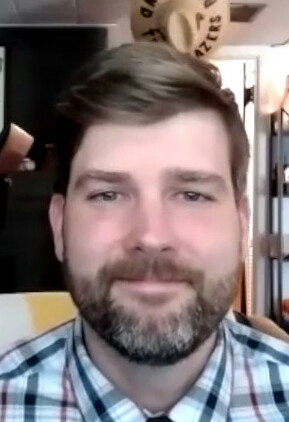

| Nominee | Mike Schmidt | Ethan D. Knight |
| Popular vote | 167,998 | 50,567 |
| Percentage | 76.60% | 23.06% |
District Attorney before election
Rod Underhill
Elected District Attorney
Mike Schmidt

The 2020 Multnomah County District Attorney election was held on May 19, 2020, concurrent with the 2020 statewide general elections, to elect the District Attorney of Multnomah County, Oregon, which includes the major city of Portland.

Oregon Criminal Justice Commission chair Mike Schmidt defeated Assistant United States Attorney Ethan Knight outright with 76.60%. Schmidt, by receiving over 50% of the votes in the primary, avoided a runoff election.

== Candidates ==
- Mike Schmidt, chair of the Oregon Criminal Justice Commission
- Ethan D. Knight, Assistant United States Attorney for the District of Oregon

== Debate ==
2020 Multnomah County District Attorney election debate
| No. | Date | Host | Moderator | Link | Nonpartisan | Nonpartisan |
| Key: P Participant A Absent N Not invited I Invited W Withdrawn | | | | | | |
| Key: P Participant A Absent N Not invited I Invited W Withdrawn | | | | | Ethan Knight | Mike Schmidt |
|---|---|---|---|---|---|---|
| 1 | Mar. 20, 2020 | City Club of Portland | | YouTube | P | P |

== Results ==
Multnomah County District Attorney election, 2020
| Party | Candidate | Votes | % |
|---|---|---|---|
| Nonpartisan | Mike Schmidt | 167,998 | 76.60% |
| Nonpartisan | Ethan D. Knight | 50,567 | 23.06% |
| Write-in | | 757 | 0.35% |
| Total votes | | 219,322 | 100% |
