= Nathan Vasquez =

Nathan Vasquez may refer to:

- Nathan Vasquez, a member of the band Be Your Own Pet
- Nathan Vasquez (lawyer), the District Attorney of Multnomah County, Oregon
