= Clackamas Town Center shooting =

Shooting near Portland, Oregon

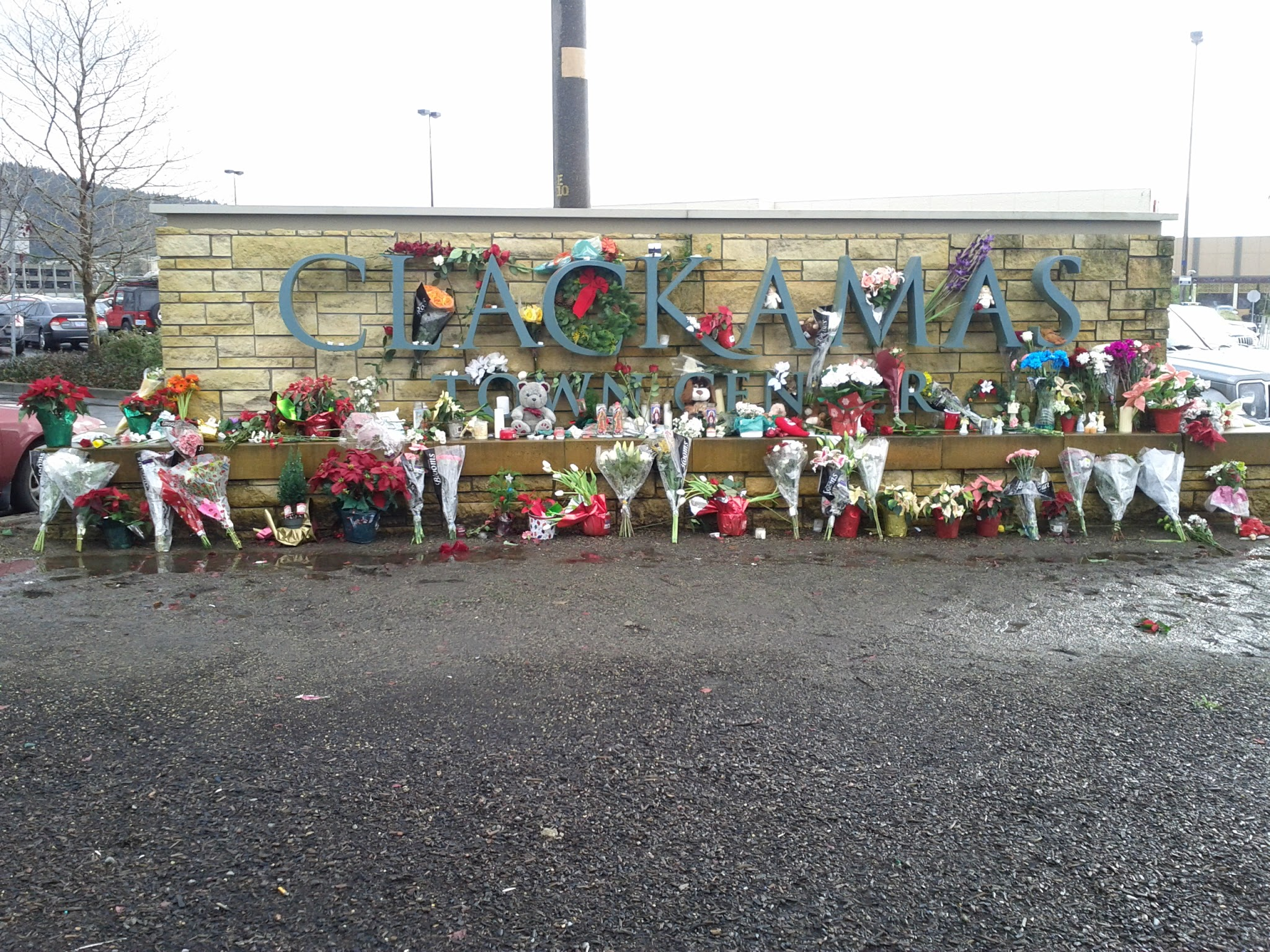
- Memorial to the victims of the shooting at the mall's entrance on December 17th, 2012.
- Location: 45.436°N 122.574°W; 12000 SE 82nd Avenue; Clackamas, Oregon, U.S.
- Date: December 11, 2012; 3:28 p.m. – 3:50 p.m. (PST)
- Attack type: Murder-suicide
- Weapon: .223-caliber Stag Arms STAG-15 Model 2 semi-automatic rifle
- Deaths: 3 (including the perpetrator)
- Injuries: 1
- Perpetrator: Jacob Tyler Roberts
- Defender: Nick Meli
- Motive: Unknown, possibly depression and suicidal ideation

On December 11, 2012, a shooting occurred at the Clackamas Town Center, a shopping center in the relatively urban section of Clackamas County, just outside the city of Portland, Oregon, United States. The gunman, 22-year-old Jacob Tyler Roberts, ran into the shopping center wearing black clothing and a white expressionless facial mask and sporadically opened fire using a Stag Arms AR-15 rifle stolen from a friend. He fired a total of 17 shots, killing two people and seriously wounding a third. Many shots were ricochets. Having attempted to reload his weapon and dropping three magazines, Roberts entered an employee-only back stairwell that runs behind all stores in the mall and committed suicide after descending one level. He had no connection to any of his victims, and it was believed to be a random act of violence.

== Details ==
=== Prior to the shooting ===
Sometime prior to the shooting, Roberts is stated to have stolen a Stag Arms STAG-15 AR-15-style rifle from an acquaintance. Immediately before the shooting, he visited a friend who lived two miles away from the Clackamas Town Center, smoked marijuana with him, and claimed that he was moving to Hawaii. He drove to the mall sometime later and parked at the south side between Macy's and Chipotle Mexican Grill. He ran into the mall through Macy's department store at 3:28 p.m., wearing a white expressionless facial mask and dressed in a black sweater and black pants. He was armed with the AR-15. He was also carrying five loaded magazines, one of which he accidentally dropped in the parking lot while entering the mall.

Roberts legally bought four additional 30-round ammunition magazines and the ammunition to fill them at three local stores, including a Walmart, The Gunbroker, and Wholesale Sports Outdoor Outfitters. When he stole the unsecured AR-15 from a friend, it was loaded with a 30-round ammunition magazine. Between 8,000 and 10,000 people were inside the mall at the time. People who first saw him run into the mall believed the tactical clothing and hockey mask were a paintball outfit and that the rifle was a toy.

=== Shooting ===
Standing in a large atrium, Roberts first opened fire at the mall's food court that was across from him at his left. The first person shot was 54-year-old shopper Cindy Ann Yuille, a hospice nurse and mother of two who was shot in the back; she died despite efforts of bystanders to treat her wound. Fifteen-year-old Kristina Shevchenko, who was walking through the mall with her friend to reach the Town Center MAX station, was the second person to be shot; she received a bullet to the chest, but she survived and made it out of the mall, where she was treated for her gunshot wound. The final victim was 45-year-old youth sports coach Steven Forsyth, the father of future NFL player Alex Forsyth, who was sitting by a rented kiosk and talking to his father on his cell phone when he was shot in the head and killed.

At this point, hundreds of people fled the mall after hearing the gunshots, but many remained inside and dashed to cover. Roberts headed further toward the food court, firing at 16-year-old employee Alina Pavlenko, who was over 100 feet away, but missed. He also dropped three other magazines in his possession. He then turned back and headed toward a JCPenney store. He attempted to reload the AR-15 at that point, but was unable to do so, the weapon having apparently jammed. During that time, Nick Meli, a concealed carry permit holder, drew his Glock 22, claimed to have taken aim at Roberts, but did not fire since there was a bystander behind Roberts.

=== Shooting ends ===
Roberts then ran into a back storage corridor, where he encountered employee Rok Sang Kim, who had returned from recycling boxes and therefore hadn't heard the gunfire. Roberts pointed the rifle at him, but didn't shoot him, instead running down a flight of stairs onto a lower floor. There, he committed suicide at 3:50 p.m. In the chaos of the first few minutes after the shooting, there were expectations of mass casualties. Police responded to the scene minutes later and spent the following hours searching the mall for hiding civilians, injured victims, and a possible second shooter, while dozens of ambulances arrived with the expectations of treating dozens of wounded victims, but treated only Kristina Shevchenko for a serious gunshot wound. Roberts fired only seventeen rounds during the entire shooting, including the one to kill himself. An additional 128 rounds were found in the magazines he dropped and on his person. Vanessa Ogden, the manager of Justice, was a pregnant woman who secured shoppers in their backroom as they hid from the shooter. She was later hospitalized and put on life support after suffering strokes from unknown causes. She died in February 2013, after being taken off life support.

By the next day, the mall was cleared of civilians, but continued to remain under lock-down. It is believed Roberts targeted random people and did not have a specific target in mind.

==== Victims ====
Two people were killed in the shooting, 54-year-old Cindy Ann Yuille and 45-year-old Steven Forsyth. A third person, 15-year-old Kristina Shevchenko, was shot in the side of the chest and seriously injured, but survived. Several others also suffered minor bruises and scrapes while fleeing.

== Perpetrator ==
Jacob's drivers license photo, undated

Jacob Tyler Roberts (March 16, 1990 – December 11, 2012) was identified as the sole perpetrator of the shooting. He lived in the Lents neighborhood in southeast Portland. Roberts was raised by his aunt Tami Roberts; his biological mother, Teresa Anne Roberts, died from cancer in February 1993, shortly before his third birthday. Court records and family indicated that the identity of his father is unknown. He had been estranged from his aunt Tami Roberts since the time he was 18 years of age, though the aunt declined to comment on the reason, saying only that it was unrelated to an $18,000 inheritance from Roberts's grandmother that court documents allegedly show Tami Roberts misappropriated. He attended Milwaukie High School in Milwaukie, Oregon for the first three years and later transferred during his senior year to Oregon City High School in Oregon City, Oregon, graduating in 2008. He attended Clackamas Community College in 2009.

Prior to the shooting, Roberts worked at a Portland gyro restaurant, Big Bertha's on S.E. Hawthorne Blvd., a popular late-night eatery in the infamous "Barmuda Triangle" known for six hard pouring bars within a two-block radius. He was loved by his employer, as well as many friends. Roberts lived with a few roommates in a house ten minutes away from the shopping center. He had plans of joining the United States Marine Corps, but he abandoned these dreams after a bicycle accident that broke his foot. Over the month prior to the shooting, Jacob had slowly sold his belongings, including a legal handgun, resigned from his job at the gyro shop, and told his friends and colleagues that he was planning to move to Hawaii. He told several friends the Friday before the shooting he had missed his flight and told them he had rebooked it. He also purchased at least four magazines and hundreds of rounds of ammunition from local stores during that same timeline.

== Reactions ==
When President Barack Obama delivered a speech regarding the Sandy Hook Elementary School shooting, he mentioned other shooting rampages that occurred in the U.S. within previous months, including the incident at the Clackamas Town Center.

On March 28, 2013, a candlelight vigil was held at the mall, organized against gun violence and one of more than 120 events held nationwide to commemorate the National Day of Action to Reduce Gun Violence.

== See also ==
- Crime in Oregon
- List of homicides in Oregon
