= Charity Lamb =

First woman convicted of murder in Oregon Territory

- Born: c. 1818; North Carolina, US
- Died: 1879 (aged 60–61); Oregon Hospital for the Insane; Portland, Oregon, US
- Known for: First woman convicted of murder in Oregon Territory

Charity Lamb (c. 1818 – 1879) was an American domestic violence survivor who was the first woman convicted of murder in Oregon Territory. She had traveled west from North Carolina via the Oregon Trail, before settling near Oregon City with her husband and six children. On May 13, 1854, Lamb mortally wounded her husband by striking him twice in the back of the head with an axe. Rumors, and information presented by the prosecution at trial, implicated involvement with a paramour, by Charity and possibly her teenage daughter, herself acquitted of the murder two months prior. The defense argued that her husband had a long history of domestic violence, and the murder was committed in self-defense, or out of a level of fear that rose to insanity, marking her trial as an early example of the abuse defense.

She was convicted of second-degree murder and sentenced to a lifetime of hard labor at the Oregon State Penitentiary. In 1862, she was transferred to Oregon Hospital for the Insane. She died there in 1879, and is likely buried on a corner of the property.

== Early life ==
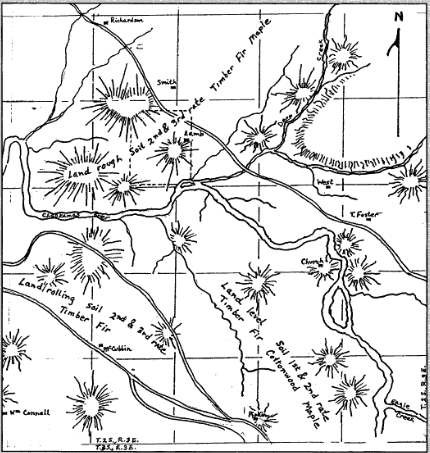
1855 survey showing the vicinity of the Lambs' cabin

Charity Lamb was born c. 1818 in North Carolina. It is not known where, but Charity had some schooling, and could read and write.

She married Nathaniel Lamb, a farmer, in 1837, and their oldest child Mary Ann was born around ten months later. By 1850 they were living in White, Missouri with four children. In 1852, the family began a five-month journey on the Oregon Trail and eventually settled about 10 miles (16 km) up the Clackamas River from Oregon City, where they received a land patent to 318 acres (129 ha). By 1854, the family had six children; Mary Ann and five sons.

== Murder of Nathaniel Lamb ==
On May 13, 1854, while the Lamb family was seated around the table for dinner in their cabin, Charity struck her husband Nathaniel twice with an axe to the back of his head. Nathaniel fell to the floor, and Charity ran out of the home. She later was found smoking a pipe at a neighbor's cabin around 0.5 miles (0.80 km) away. She told the constable that she "did not mean to kill the critter, … only intended to stun him." She was branded "a monster" by the local newspapers, which praised Nathaniel as "an industrious and quiet citizen, and had a good claim, which he had improved considerably with his own hands." (Note: For "a good claim" see land claim.)

Nathaniel died a week later, and an autopsy was performed. Nathaniel's body was taken to the local church, which also assumed custody of the children. Rumor began to circulate that Charity and her 17-year-old daughter Mary Ann had been seduced by a drifter named Collins, with whom they were to escape to California, and that it was in pursuit of this end that the murder had been committed. (Note: According to information reported in the trial, Nathaniel had discovered a letter to Collins, which Mary Ann had hidden in "her bosom". After which either Charity or Mary Ann took the letter from Nathaniel and destroyed it.)

Two months after Nathaniel's death on May 10, indictments were issued for both Charity and her teenage daughter.

=== Trial ===
On July 13, 1854, Lamb appeared in the U.S. District Court at Oregon City. She was represented by a court-appointed attorney and the presiding judge was Cyrus Olney. Her daughter had already been acquitted days earlier in a trial that lasted less than a day, and the same attorneys who had represented Mary Ann were then appointed to represent Charity. She was charged with premeditated murder, a charge which carried the death penalty, and said nothing when asked to plead to the charges. She would then wait some two additional months in the custody of the local jail, for the trial was to take place in September. (Note: By the time the trial took place she had been in custody a total of four months. During this she experienced "physical or mental problems" and received "medical treatment", although the source does not give further detail.)

When proceedings began, she arrived in court cradling her infant child in her arms. The Oregonian described her as "pale and sallow, and emaciated as a skeleton". She now pleaded not guilty. The trial would last six days.

In jury selection, all but six of the all-male pool of potential jurors were eliminated, (Note: At this time, only men were permitted to serve on juries.) and the sheriff had to select additional candidates out of the group of spectators. The prosecution probed the candidates, asking whether they had a prejudice in favor of "the fairer sex" or whether there "needed to be more evidence to convict a woman than was needed to convict a man".

==== Prosecution ====
At the outset of the trial, two of the requirements for a murder charge had already largely been settled: Nathaniel had been killed, and Charity had killed him. Charity had already admitted to as much multiple times.

Regarding the matter of intent, the defense turned to the matter of Collins, the traveler reported by the newspapers, supposed to have seduced either Charity or Mary Ann, or perhaps both. Around a week before the killing, Nathaniel had discovered a letter to Collins, written by one or the other, or written by Charity on her daughter's behalf. Nathaniel or Mary Ann had destroyed the letter after its discovery. The prosecution argued that the nature of the murder, attacking from behind while the victim was seated, indicated it was planned, and that Charity, disaffected and isolated on the frontier, had shown no remorse after the fact.

==== Defense ====
Her defense represented one of the earliest known cases predicated on spousal abuse syndrome and the abuse defense. Two of Charity's children testified that their father often beat her, with one of the children recounting that he had assaulted her with a hammer. Lamb testified that he attempted to poison her and often threatened her with violence. The week prior to his murder, Lamb's husband claimed that he had plans to kill her, abandon the family, and head to California. It was reported during the trial, that while travelling on the Oregon Trail, Charity carried Nathaniel's gun at the head of the train, to prevent him from using it against her after he threatened to kill her. Their child Thomas testified of events that occurred on the morning of the murder:

[Nathaniel] started to Mr. Cook's with the gun, and went a piece and came back to the gate, and put the gun to the paling, and pointed it at [Charity]. I was in the house and saw it. When Mary Ann rose up and saw him, he turned away the gun and shot it off at a big tree.

Their child Abram testified that the week before the murder had seen renewed threats from Nathaniel over finding the letter to Collins. That she "better not run off", and that if she did "he would follow her, and settle her when she didn't know it." At the dinner table on the same day as the murder, Charity had expressed her fear that Nathaniel had made plans to take the boys and move to California, that he had sold his mare and was preparing. Thomas testified that Nathaniel had told him similarly.

The defense also argued insanity, or at least that Charity was partially insane, calling her a monomaniac. (Note: Her Lawyer James Kelly argued: "Total deprivation of reason is not necessary to exonerate from punishment … It is now enough that the mind is deranged on the subject matter of the act charged as crime. It may be sound on all other subjects … except the faculty of judging rightly on that particular subject … And this accounts for the opinions of witnesses that she was sane. The existence of this delusions was not perceptible to those witnesses. They saw only her general conduct, which was regular …") Doctors who had seen her while in jail testified that she had seemed "excited" and "wild-like", but they thought she was faking. Others testified that she was noticeably upset the morning of the murder, but seemed rational on the same evening.

==== Conviction and sentencing ====
Judge Olney stressed the consideration of self-defense, instructing the jury that Charity should be found innocent if she had "acted out of a genuine belief in self-preservation". Despite this, the jury found Charity guilty of second-degree murder, as they determined that while she might have been justified in interpreting her husband's threats as inevitable, they were not imminent and her anxiety did not rise to the level of legal insanity. However, the jury sympathized with Lamb and urged leniency on the part of the judge. Standing at sentencing, Charity told the court, "I knew he was going to kill me," to which the judge replied, "The jury thinks you ought to have gone away." She responded:

Well. He told me not to go, and if I went that he would follow me, and find me somewhere; and he was a mighty good shot. He once gave me a chance to go; and I consented. I even gave up my baby and started. He told me to come back, or he would drop me in my tracks; and I had to come back.

The law mandated that she be sentenced to life in prison, the most lenient sentence the judge could impose. She spent the next two years in the local jail, before being transferred to the Oregon State Penitentiary to perform hard labor.

She thus became the first woman convicted of murder in Oregon Territory, and it was only the second time an Oregon jury had decided the matter of felony charges against a woman, the first being the trial of Charity's daughter Mary Ann months earlier. She was the eighth person incarcerated in Oregon.

== Later life and death ==
Oregon Hospital for the Insane

Following the conviction, the family's belongings were auctioned and the children were raised by a number of other families.

In 1862 Charity remained Oregon's only female inmate. Her duties as part of her "hard labor" included laundering the warden's clothes, and though other prisoners were said to "'elope' or escape at will from the facility", Charity did not. At some point, she received mention in the prison newspaper as a "commendation for her hardiness". (Note: The Weekly Oregon Statesman reported in 1889 that Charity was a cook while at the penitentiary, and was found mixing glass into the food. However, they also appeared to be unaware of her death more than years after the fact, and so it is not clear what the reliability of this report is. Other more modern sources do not appear to recognize this report.) More than five years after her conviction, Quaker missionaries recorded visiting the prison and talking to their lone female resident. Charity maintained that she had done nothing wrong.

There was a short-lived effort in the early 1860s to have Charity pardoned, but nothing came of it.

She was transferred to Oregon Hospital for the Insane in 1862. Steve Laam, (Note: Abraham Lamb changed his name to Laam, though it is not clear that this was a direct result of the murder.) the great-great-grandson of Charity, later recounted that this was a humanitarian move, rather than being done for the reason of mental illness. By 1863 she was among 34 residents of the asylum, five of which were women. Visitation was allowed at this new facility, although no records exist to verify whether her children ever visited her. The asylum, founded by James C. Hawthorne, was run so that the residents were comparatively well cared for, in a way that was "in direct opposition to earlier concepts of cruelty, punishment and imprisonment."

The only surviving record of Charity's life at the asylum is the report of facility inspectors from 1865:

She sat knitting as the visiting party went through the hall, face imperturbably fixed in half smiling contentment apparently as satisfied with her lot as the happiest of sane people with theirs. (Note: The source here specifies that the report was from 1865; however, this report appears in the February 03, 1866 edition of The State Rights Democrat verbatim.)

Lamb died in 1879. The cause of death was recorded as apoplexy, likely a stroke or internal hemorrhage. She was most likely buried at the southwest corner of the Lone Fir Cemetery in Portland, just to the east of the Chinese railroad workers section, where researchers believe up to 132 patients from the mental hospital were buried. However, her name did not appear in cemetery records. Around 1930, the southwest corner was paved over to allow for Multnomah County to begin building on the property.

As of 2009, the plot of landed owned by the Lambs was held as a privately owned parcel outside of Eagle Creek, Oregon. The remains of the family's cabin persisted on the land until at least 1969.

== See also ==
- Crime in Oregon
- History of Oregon
- Violence against women in the United States
