= Jesse Lee Calhoun =

American criminal

Jesse Lee Calhoun (born March 19, 1985) is an American convicted felon and suspected serial killer in the Portland metropolitan area.

== Criminal history ==
In 2019, Calhoun was convicted in Multnomah County Circuit Court in Oregon for felony burglary and car theft. He was sentenced to 50 months in prison, but in 2021, his sentence was commuted by then-Gov. Kate Brown. Brown issued commutations to Calhoun and 40 other inmates who helped fight Oregon's 2020 Labor Day wildfires. Calhoun was released from custody on July 22, 2021, and was later arrested on June 6, 2023, for parole violations. At the request of the Multnomah County District Attorney, Calhoun's commutation was subsequently revoked by Gov. Tina Kotek.

Between February 2023 and May 2023, the bodies of six women were discovered in the greater Portland metropolitan area. In June 2023, the Portland Police Bureau issued a statement that it "has no reason to believe [the] 6 cases are connected." However, on May 16, 2024, a Multnomah County grand jury indicted Calhoun for the murders of three of the women: Charity Lynn Perry (age 24), Bridget Leanne Webster (age 31), and Joanna Speaks (age 32). On August 5, 2025, Multnomah County District Attorney Nathan Vasquez announced at a news conference that Calhoun was indicted for the murder of a fourth woman: Kristin Smith (age 22). He was indicted for the murder of Ashley Real in May 2026 (age 22). He was indicted for the murder of Elizabeth "Libby" Gibson in September 2026 (age 32).

After Calhoun was named a person of interest in four murders, former Gov. Kate Brown was roundly criticized for commuting Calhoun's sentence for felony burglary and theft. Public records indicate that Calhoun violated the terms of his release on numerous occasions, yet he remained released after several violations. Then-Multnomah County District Attorney Mike Schmidt's office reportedly "abstained from vetting Calhoun's commutation," but was not provided a "meaningful opportunity" to consider the commutation. Legal experts rejected any broad link between commutation and violent crime, and some argued that Calhoun may have been released early without then-Gov. Kate Brown's commutation.

Calhoun's trial for the murders is expected to commence in 2027. He has pled not guilty to the murders for which he has been charged.
