= 2022 Normandale Park shooting =

Mass shooting in Oregon, U.S.

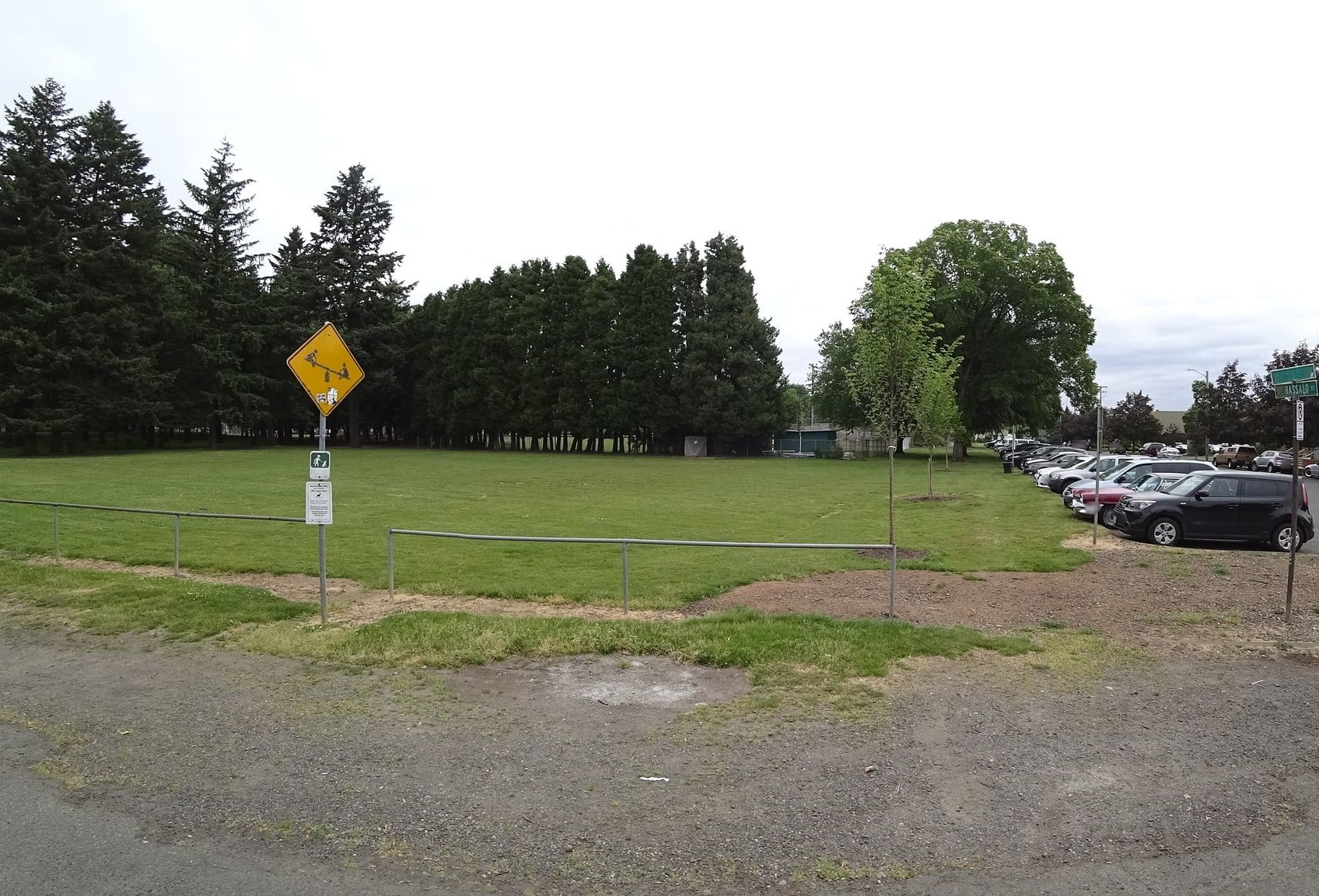
- The shooting location, photographed in 2018
- Shooting location at Normandale Park in Portland
- Location: 45.530355°N 122.607042°W; Portland, Oregon, United States
- Date: February 19, 2022 c. 8:00 pm (PST)
- Attack type: Mass shooting
- Weapon: Handgun
- Deaths: 2 (including a victim who died in 2024)
- Injuries: 4 (including the perpetrator)
- Perpetrator: Benjamin Jeffrey Smith
- Defender: Unnamed armed protestor
- Charges: 1 count of second-degree murder; 4 counts of attempted murder; 3 counts of first-degree assault; 1 count of second-degree assault
- Verdict: Life in prison with the possibility of parole after 55 years.
- Convicted: Pleaded guilty to all charges
- Judge: Christopher Marshall

On February 19, 2022, 43-year-old Benjamin Jeffrey Smith approached and opened fire on a small group of protesters, at the edge of Normandale Park in Portland, Oregon, United States. He murdered one, caused the paralysis of another (who later died of complications resulting from the attack), and seriously injured three others, including a bystander who had approached to deescalate.

The shooting took place near a demonstration for Amir Locke, a 22-year-old Black man who was shot and killed in a "no knock entry" by a Minneapolis police officer in February 2022, and Patrick Kimmons, a 27-year-old Black man killed by Portland police during a 2018 altercation.

Smith was arrested and charged with second-degree murder, four counts of attempted murder, and several assault charges in connection with the shooting. He pleaded guilty to all charges and was sentenced to life in prison.

== Shooting ==
On the evening of Saturday, February 19, 2022, several traffic safety volunteers had gathered near the intersection of NE 55th and NE Hassalo, near the southwest corner of Normandale Park, for a “Justice for Amir Locke” protest, in reference to the Black man who had been killed weeks earlier in Minneapolis while police executed a no-knock warrant on an apartment. Several protests had been held in Portland in the weeks following Locke's death. The night of February 19, a few people were providing traffic safety by rerouting vehicular traffic to avoid a protest march.

Benjamin Smith confronted a group of protesters and told them to leave and said he would shoot them. People attempted to de-escalate the situation, but Smith pulled a handgun and fired at close range into a crowd of safety volunteers and struck five. An armed protester fired back and struck Smith near his hip.

At least eight spent shell casings that matched the assailant's handgun were found at the scene, as well as at least one spent rifle shell casing.

Portland Police Bureau responded to the shooting and closed streets in the area.

=== Victims ===
June "T-Rex" Knightly, a 60-year old woman, was pronounced dead at the scene of the shooting. Four others were wounded by gunfire and transported to a hospital, with one being struck in the neck paralyzed from the neck down as a result.

The 32-year-old struck in the neck and paralyzed from the neck down, identified only as "Deg", died on July 2, 2024, after requesting to be removed from a ventilator. It was ruled that she died of complications from a gunshot wound to the neck and her death has been listed as a homicide.

Knightly had been an activist with Portland's racial justice movements and was among a small group preparing to act as a traffic safety volunteer the night of the shooting. She was struck by a bullet in her head that was fired at close range. Knightly and others in the group that Smith initially approached were unarmed.

=== Perpetrator ===
Benjamin Jeffery Smith

Benjamin Jeffery Smith (born November 28, 1978) was 43 years old at the time of the shooting. He rented an apartment near Normandale Park in Portland. He had expressed animosity towards Antifa and Black Lives Matter and had expressed support for Nazis, Proud Boys, and Kyle Rittenhouse, the person who was acquitted of criminal charges related to the Kenosha unrest shooting. In June 2022, the Federal Bureau of Investigation (FBI) confirmed it had flagged Smith's behavior going back to 2006, and that the bureau had contacted him in 2021 about it. It was unclear if the FBI had ever warned local law enforcement, but the investigation was abandoned. He had also been convicted of criminal mischief and harassment in 2010. Smith had been reported to law enforcement several times in the years leading up to the shooting, including by a relative who called a non-emergency line in May 2021 to report a death threat he received from Smith via Facebook Messenger.

=== Arrests ===
Smith was hospitalized in serious condition and placed under arrest; he was formally charged and was booked into jail facility on March 23, 2022. The armed protester who returned fire was initially arrested on assault and weapons charges, but the charges were dropped.

== Investigation ==
Initial reporting from the Portland Police Bureau (PPB) claimed the shooting began due to "a confrontation between an armed homeowner and armed protesters.” This was inaccurate, as Smith was not a homeowner and the victims he first approached were unarmed. The PPB later updated its statement to call Smith an "armed area resident." The bureau's initial mischaracterization of the incident drew significant criticism.

Pieces of evidence from the crime scene were removed, which caused some difficulty for investigators.

Tension between demonstrators and officials persisted during the investigation. City leaders said they had difficulty obtaining information from witnesses, which some racial justice advocates said that was due to false characterizations about the demonstration and of fears of further violence or reprisal. Sandy Chung, executive director of the Oregon ACLU, noted the "context and environment of threats and doxing towards Black leaders and communities who are fighting for racial justice, but also the allies of this work." Chuck Lovell, the Portland police chief, said that shell casings, and possibly other evidence, were removed from the crime scene, which hampered the initial investigation. A police department spokesperson said that witnesses who may have recorded the incident on their mobile phones did not share it with police. Police investigators obtained GoPro video footage from a witness. A victim shared audio and video recordings of the incident.

The Medical Examiner's office determined Knightly's death was a homicide due to a gunshot wound to the head. Police investigators declined to speculate on a motive in the days after the attack.

== Legal proceedings ==
On February 21, 2022, Mike Schmidt, the Multnomah County District Attorney, announced Smith would be charged with nine criminal counts related to the February 19, 2022 incident: one count of second-degree murder with a firearm, four counts of second-degree attempted murder with a firearm, two counts of first-degree assault with a firearm, and two counts of second-degree assault with a firearm.

The judicial case was presided over by Judge Christopher Marshall of Multnomah County Circuit Court. Smith was represented by a court-appointed attorney. A grand jury heard four days of testimony from 12 witness witnesses on February 28 and on March 4, 7, and 10 in 2022. The grand jury voted to indict Smith, and on March 23, 2022, he was transferred from a hospital and booked into a jail facility, and the case information was available for public view.

In a court hearing on March 24, 2022, Smith pleaded not guilty to the charges. He was held in a Multnomah County jail facility without bail to await the criminal trial that was scheduled for April 2023. In a court hearing on March 8, 2023, Smith pleaded guilty to second-degree murder, four counts of attempted murder, three counts of first-degree assault, and one count of second degree assault. He was sentenced on April 18, 2023, to life in prison with the possibility of parole after 55 years. Smith is currently incarcerated at the Snake River Correctional Institution in Ontario, Oregon.

== Reaction ==
The day after the shooting, Portland mayor Ted Wheeler issued a statement that included, "While many of the details of last night's shooting near Normandale Park are unclear, we do know one thing for sure: Our community is dealing with the sadness of another senseless act of gun violence."

Portland Commissioner Jo Ann Hardesty said in a statement on Twitter, "While we need more information about what transpired, I can say that protesting for racial justice should never endanger those exercising their 1st amendment rights."

Rallies to show solidarity with the victims of the shooting were held in Minneapolis and New York City on February 21, 2022. Activists held a memorial for Knightly at Normandale Park on February 22, 2022. Activists left tributes to her and set up a makeshift memorial and encampment at a pavilion in the park.

Many of the deceased victim's friends and local advocates called the shooting "predictable" due to the history of far-right gathering and violent protests held in Portland in the past year. Some also highlighted the city's history of white supremacy and race crimes.

The Legislative BIPOC Caucus of the Oregon Legislative Assembly said in a statement, “We cannot normalize violence towards our neighbors exercising their First Amendment right to peacefully gather. This weekend, we saw the fatal result of irresponsible rhetoric that villainizes those exercising the right to peaceful protest for racial justice."

The PPB's initial, inaccurate statement drew widespread condemnation for its mischaracterization of the victims. Advocates, including the ACLU of Oregon, argued the error was part of a "pattern and practice" by city officials of misrepresenting racial justice protesters. To support this claim, critics pointed to a list of recent PPB scandals, including a lieutenant's friendly texts with a right-wing leader, the police leak of a false story about a city commissioner who was a police critic, and the discovery of training documents that mocked protesters. Teressa Raiford, executive director of Don't Shoot Portland, said about the mischaracterization, "I believe that it was [done] to entice vigilantism." Several local organizations subsequently called for an independent investigation into the city's spread of misinformation.

In January 2025 Portland police chief Bob Day issued a formal apology for publishing inaccurate information about the incident. He apologized specifically for the police bureau initially saying the shooter was a homeowner when he was not, for falsely claiming the victims were armed protestors when they were unarmed traffic safety volunteers, and for not clarifying the shooting was an unprovoked attack on an innocent group.

== See also ==
- Crime in Oregon
- George Floyd protests in Portland, Oregon
- List of homicides in Oregon
- List of mass shootings in the United States in 2022
