= Nathan Vasquez (lawyer) =

American lawyer

District Attorney of Multnomah County
- Incumbent
- Assumed office January 1, 2025
- Preceded by: Mike Schmidt

Personal details
- Education: University of California, Davis (BA); Lewis and Clark College (JD)

Nathan Vasquez is an American attorney who is the District Attorney of Multnomah County, Oregon. In May 2024, Vasquez defeated incumbent Mike Schmidt.

== Career ==
In 2001, Vasquez graduated from Lewis & Clark Law School. He joined the Multnomah County District Attorney's office as an intern, and later as a prosecutor.

In 2022, Vasquez prosecuted the second-degree murder case of Benjamin Smith stemming from the February 2022 Normandale Park shooting.

In April 2024, Vasquez faced an ethics complaint before the Oregon State Bar when, in election material, he publicly accused a man of being a serial killer despite the man facing no charges. The Oregon State Bar ultimately dismissed the complaint, citing "no sufficient basis to warrant a referral to Disciplinary Counsel." In May 2024, the man Vasquez accused, Jesse Lee Calhoun, was charged with three counts of murder and three counts of abuse of a corpse. Calhoun was previously imprisoned for burglary and vehicle theft but in July 2021, his sentence was commuted by then-Governor Kate Brown.

=== 2024 District Attorney election ===
In 2023, Vasquez announced his intention to challenge incumbent Schmidt in the 2024 election.

During the campaign, Vasquez earned broad support from Portland's public safety unions and business leaders. He received sizable campaign contributions from business leaders like Phil Knight and Tim Boyle. Before the primary election on May 21, 2024, Vasquez was endorsed by The Oregonian and Willamette Week.

On May 22, 2024, Schmidt conceded the election. Vasquez received 53.3% of the vote while Schmidt received 46.3%. Since Vasquez won a majority in this primary election, there was no general election in November 2024 for the position. Although he was elected on May 21, 2024, Vasquez did not become Multnomah County district attorney until January 1, 2025.

After Vasquez defeated Schmidt, internal strife occurred within the Multnomah County district attorney's office. On May 29, 2024, Schmidt sent Vasquez an e-mail ordering him to refrain from transition-related activity during business hours unless authorized by Schmidt. Although Schmidt's predecessor resigned before the end of his term, leaving him to deal with the unrest in the wake of the murder of George Floyd in Minneapolis, Minnesota, Schmidt's full term was scheduled to run through December 31, 2024.
