= Snake River Correctional Institution =

Medium security prison in Oregon, U.S.

- Location in the United States Location in Oregon
- Location: Malheur County, Oregon, near Ontario; 44.079°N 117.066°W
- Status: Operational
- Security class: Medium with co-located Minimum
- Capacity: 3,050
- Population: 2,940
- Opened: 1991; 35 years ago
- Managed by: ODOC
- Warden: Joe Woodland
- Website: Oregon prisons

Snake River Correctional Institution (SRCI) is a medium security men's prison in the western United States in eastern Oregon. The largest facility in the Oregon Department of Corrections system, it is located in unincorporated northeastern Malheur County, about five miles (8 km) northwest of central Ontario, which is near the Snake River.

== History ==
The state's prison siting committee selected the Ontario site in October 1989 for a medium security prison that could house up to 3,000 inmates, which Governor Neil Goldschmidt approved later in the month. SRCI opened in August 1991 with 576 medium and 72 minimum security beds.

In 1994, the Oregon Legislature approved a $175 million expansion; built by Hoffman Construction, it was completed in 1998. At the time, it was the largest public works project in the state's history.

== Operations ==
Currently, the prison houses 2,336 medium security beds, 154 minimum security beds, and 510 beds in specialized units such as administrative segregation, disciplinary segregation, intensive management, and the infirmary/hospice. It is staffed by approximately 900 employees.

Among the prison industries housed at Snake River are a commercial call center, a metal shop that manufactures road signs for the state, and a building trades program that manufactures small modular structures such as comfort stations and gatehouses for the state parks.

The elevation of the prison is approximately 2,480 feet (755 m) above sea level.

== Notable inmates ==
- Benjamin Jeffrey Smith, perpetrator of the Normandale Park shooting in 2022.
- Ben McLemore, Former NBA player convicted of rape
- Richard Lawrence Marquette (also known as Dick Marquette; born December 12, 1934), killed three women
- Ward Weaver III, convicted of killing two girls

== See also ==
- List of Oregon prisons and jails
