= White, Missouri =

Extinct hamlet in Missouri, U.S.

Coordinates: 37°58′47″N 90°42′17″W

White is an extinct town in Washington County, in the U.S. state of Missouri. The community was located on Keyes Branch near its confluence with Mill Creek along the railroad line. Cadet lies one mile to the north and Mineral Point is 2.5 south-southeast of the location.

A post office called White was established in 1902, and remained in operation until 1906. The community has the name of one Mr. White, a mining official.
