= 1994 Oregon Ballot Measure 11 =

Referendum on mandatory minimum sentences

Measure 11
- Establishing mandatory minimum sentencing for various crimes

Results
Choice	Votes	%
Yes	788,695	65.64%
No	412,816	34.36%
- County results Yes: 50–60% 60–70% 70–80%

Measure 11, also known as "One Strike You're Out", was a citizens' initiative passed in 1994 in the U.S. State of Oregon. This statutory enactment established mandatory minimum sentencing for several crimes. The measure was approved in the November 8, 1994, general election with 788,695 votes in favor, and 412,816 votes against.

The sentencing judge cannot give a lesser sentence than that prescribed by Measure 11, nor can a prisoner's sentence be reduced for good behavior. Prisoners cannot be paroled prior to serving their minimum sentence.

Minimum sentences mandated by Measure 11
Crime	Minimum sentence
Aggravated murder	30 to life
Murder	25 years
First degree manslaughter	10 years
Conspiracy to commit aggravated murder	10 years
Attempted aggravated murder	10 years
First degree unlawful sexual penetration**	8 years, 4 months
First degree sodomy**	8 years, 4 months
First degree rape**	8 years, 4 months
First degree arson with threat of serious injury	7 years, 6 months
First degree robbery	7 years, 6 months
First degree kidnapping**	7 years, 6 months
First degree assault	7 years, 6 months
Conspiracy to commit murder	7 years, 6 months
Attempted murder	7 years, 6 months
First degree sexual abuse*	6 years, 3 months
Second degree unlawful sexual penetration*	6 years, 3 months
Second degree sodomy*	6 years, 3 months
Second degree rape*	6 years, 3 months
Second degree manslaughter*	6 years, 3 months
Pornographic exploitation of a child	5 years, 10 months
Compelling prostitution	5 years, 10 months
These are probable sentences:	
Second degree assault*	5 years, 10 months
Second degree kidnapping*	5 years, 10 months
Second degree robbery*	5 years, 10 months
*ORS 137.712 may authorize the court to impose a sentence of less than the M11 minimum
**300-month minimum applies only to adult defendants for crimes committed on/after 4/24/06

The measure applies to all defendants aged 15 and over, requiring juveniles 15 and over charged with these crimes to be tried as adults.

The measure was placed on the ballot via initiative petition by Crime Victims United, a tough-on-crime political group. Then-State Representative Kevin Mannix, who sponsored the measure, has since argued that violent criminals cannot be reformed through probation or short prison sentences, and that the time they are kept incarcerated is itself a benefit to society.

Ballot Measure 10, also passed in 1994, permitted the Oregon Legislative Assembly to change Measure 11, but only with a 2/3 vote in each chamber. The legislature has done so several times.

Legislative Attempts to Alter or Repeal Measure 11:

- House Bill 3439 passed June 1995: Added Attempted Murder and Attempted Aggravated Murder.
- Senate Bill 1049 passed July 1997: Added Arson I (when a serious physical threat is involved), Compelling Prostitution, and Use of Child in Display of Sex Act. This also allowed for departures from the mandatory minimum sentencing for some Assault II, Kidnapping II, and Robbery II convictions.
- House Bill 2494 passed August 1999: Allowed for departures from the mandatory minimum sentence for some Manslaughter II convictions committed after October 23, 1999.
- Measure 94 defeated November 2000: Attempt to repeal mandatory minimum sentencing in Oregon; defeated 387,068 to 1,073,275.^{[14]}
- House Bill 2379 passed July 2001: Allowed for departure from the mandatory minimum sentence for some Rape II, Sodomy II, Sexual Penetration II, and Sexual Abuse I convictions after January 1, 2002.
- Senate Bill 1008 passed in May 2019 (pending signature from the Governor): The bill is a major overhaul of many Measure 11 stipulations. Key parts of the bill seek to address the impacts of Measure 11 on youth reported by the Oregon Justice Resource Center, such as:
  - "Second Look" hearings for any juvenile convicted in adult court after completion of half their sentence. Judges are to consider factors such as remorse and rehabilitation, and may reduce the remainder of the juvenile's sentence to community-based supervision.
  - Prohibiting life without parole for minors.
  - Ensuring minors of 15 years or older are not automatically tried as adults for major crimes.

Proponents of Measure 11 argued that judges had been too lenient in sentencing violent offenders. They saw the measure as critical for lowering crime rates.

Opponents of Measure 11 argued that judges should be allowed discretion in sentencing and should be able to account for the particular circumstances of a given crime. They also objected to the requirement that many youth defendants be tried as adults.

Oregon's prison population increased after Measure 11, and as of 2004, 41% of the growth was attributed to the direct or indirect impact of Measure 11. Crime rates in Oregon decreased between 1994 and 2000, but increased in 2001; opponents of Measure 11 noted that the trend mirrored national trends, while acknowledging that some likely re-offenders were imprisoned as a result of the law.

The effectiveness of Measure 11 to deter crime is further questioned when compared to research about mandatory minimums. Research has repeatedly disproven mandatory minimums as public safety tools. For example, a 1993 meta-analysis report compiled from 50 different studies found mandatory minimums’ lengthier prison sentences produced higher rates of recidivism and a tendency for lower-risk offenders to experience more negative outcomes.

== Background and context ==
Prior to 1989, Oregon judges would decide whether a convicted felon should be put on probation or sent to prison, and for those sent to prison, set a maximum sentence (known as an "indeterminate sentence.") Based on a subsequent decision by the Parole Board, which used an assessment of good behavior, rehabilitative efforts, and criminal case, the average offender would serve a fraction of the sentence handed down by the judge.

The Oregon Legislative Assembly established felony sentencing guidelines in 1989, in an attempt to achieve the following four goals:

- Proportional punishment, imposing the most severe sentences on the most serious offenders
- Truth in sentencing, so the judge's sentence would more closely reflect actual prison time
- Sentence uniformity, to reduce disparities among judges
- Maintenance of correctional capacity consistent with sentencing policy, so the criminal justice system would be able to deliver proposed penalties.

Parole release for most offenders was abolished by the establishment of these guidelines. The Board of Parole and Post-Prison Supervision continues to have release authority over those prison inmates sentenced for crimes committed prior to November 1, 1989, those sentenced by the courts as dangerous offenders, and for murderers and aggravated murderers who are eligible for parole, regardless of the date of their crimes. Other prisoners began serving at least 80% of their sentences.

Measure 11, passed in 1994, affected only specific crimes, which were covered by the sentencing guidelines from 1989 to 1994.

Various exceptions exist to the guidelines, and to Measure 11 restrictions on sentencing.

== Impact on youth ==
In February 2018, Oregon Council on Civil Rights, in collaboration with the Oregon Justice Resource Center, released a report on the impact of Measure 11 on Oregon's young people and whether the law is out-of-step with legal and scientific developments of recent years.

According to the report, Measure 11 mandates that juveniles hold the same culpability as adults, despite brain science declaring otherwise. The US Supreme Court has ruled several times in regards to the sentencing of minors:

- Roper v. Simmons, which ruled that juveniles cannot be sentenced to death.
- Graham v. Florida, which ruled that juvenile life without parole is unconstitutional for non-homicide juvenile offenders.
- Miller v. Alabama, which ruled that mandatory juvenile life without parole is unconstitutional for all crimes.
- Montgomery v. Louisiana, which confirms that the miller ruling now be applied retroactively.
- Key conceptual takeaways from the supreme court decisions:
  - Youth have a unique capacity for reform.
  - Youth are fundamentally different from, and less culpable than, adults
  - All youth should have a reasonable opportunity to demonstrate their ability to change.
  - Lengthy sentences that fail to take into consideration the mitigating qualities of youth are in violation of their Eighth Amendment rights.
  - Youth should have access to a “meaningful opportunity for release.

Some key statistics:

- Today, Oregon incarcerates young people at a higher rate than almost every other state in the country, including Texas and Louisiana. In fact, Oregon has the second highest rate of youth transfers to adult court in the nation, with young people - especially youth of color - subjected to lifelong consequences as a result.
- In 2012, Oregon convicted black youth of Measure 11 offenses at 17 times the rate of their white counterparts.
- Black youth account for 15.5% of Measure 11 indictments but only 1.8% of the general population in Oregon (resulting in an overrepresentation of around 8.6 times.)
- The average relative rate of disparity (measure by the relative rate index or RRI2 ) between black and white youth for the five most common Measure 11 crimes is 15.26. The overall RRI for all crimes covered in this study was 13.6.
- Oregon taxpayers bear a significant burden for youth incarceration. Measure 11 offenders require close custody, the most expensive form of state confinement, which can result in costs of as much as $263 per day and $95,995 per year, per juvenile.

== Impact on women ==
In October 2018, the annual Women in Prison Conference held by the Oregon Justice Resource Center Women's Justice Project focused primarily on the effects of mandatory minimum sentences imposed by Measure 11 on female defendants. The conference highlights similar concerns and statistics echoed by Measure 11's original opponents in concerns to youth, including:

- Oregon's incarceration rate for women has tripled since 1994 when Measure 11 when was first passed
- Many convicted females had mitigating circumstances at the times of their cases, which are barred from consideration during sentencing under Measure 11's mandatory minimums. Coffee Creek Correctional Facility reported 2015 that 46% of their intakes that year experienced domestic violence; 76% were unemployed; over half had children; and 38% had not finished high school.

== Political impact ==
The passage of Measure 11 was a central issue of Governor John Kitzhaber's first term, and remains a matter of controversy in Oregon politics. Supporters credit Measure 11 for reducing crime rates.^{[12]} Opponents argue Measure 11 pressures innocent defendants into plea bargains for lesser (non-Measure 11) crimes, due to fear of mandatory sentences.^{[13]}

== See also ==
- Oregon Ballot Measure 40 (1996) and subsequent measures
- List of Oregon ballot measures
- Oregon Criminal Justice Commission
