= Stag Arms =

American firearms manufacturer

Stag Arms LLC
- Company type: Private
- Industry: Arms industry
- Founded: May 2003; 23 years ago New Britain, Connecticut, U.S.
- Headquarters: Cheyenne, Wyoming, U.S.
- Products: Firearms
- Number of employees: 21
- Parent: White Wolf Capital
- Website: www.stagarms.com

Stag Arms is a firearms manufacturer founded in May 2003 and located in Cheyenne, Wyoming. Stag Arms is a manufacturer of the AR-15 type rifle, marketed as Stag-15 rifles. Stag advertises that all their weapons and accessories are made in the United States. They are best known for their left-handed AR-15 rifles, which use a mirror imaged upper receiver and have the ejection port reversed for left-handed shooters and the safety selector control on the right side of the lower receiver.

In February 2016, White Wolf Capital, a private equity firm, announced that it had acquired Stag Arms. According to the accompanying press release, the company will continue to manufacture firearms in New Britain, Connecticut.

In January 2017, at the 2017 Shot Show in Las Vegas, NV, Stag Arm's announced its first AR-10 type rifle, marketed as Stag-10. This rifle features the .308 caliber cartridge and will be available in the left-handed variant by July 2017. Along with this .308 left-handed platform, Stag Arm's will also be releasing a 6.5 Creedmoor in July 2017.

In addition to AR-15's, Stag Arms also makes a series of bolt action rifles called the Pursuit, which is a highly customized rifle built with the same internal workings and specifications of the Remington Model 700, allowing the rifle to be compatible with the many aftermarket parts for a Model 700. The heart of the 700-style rifle is made from a 7075 aluminium alloy, giving it an excellent tensile strength and resistance to wear and corrosion, and the bottom is machined to accept a 5-round detachable magazine, which is included with the rifle, but 10 round magazines are also available, and includes ambidextrous magazine releases. The bolt features a unique 3-lug bolt design allowing for increase smoothness of cycling the action and chambering a round, and is designed to be fully disassembled without the need for tools. The fire control system uses a TriggerTech flat-faced trigger, with a trigger pull of only 2.75 pounds. The Pursuit's barrel is made from 416 stainless steel, and depending on caliber comes in 18-inch, 20-inch or 22-inch lengths and is threaded with a standard 5/8x24 RH thread, allowing attachment of muzzle devices such as a flash suppressor, muzzle brake, or suppressors. It is mounted on a modular, black, hybrid hunter stock with an adjustable cheek riser and length of pull, and includes M-LOK sections, a Picatinny spigot, and integrated QD cups for the attaching of accessories like scopes, iron sights, weapon lights and slings. The Pursuit is chambered for the .308 Winchester, 6.5 Creedmoor and 6.5 PRC.

Stag also makes a selection of Title II firearms, which are firearms such as machine guns, short-barrel rifles (SBR), short-barrel shotguns (SBS), and suppressors which are regulated by both the National Firearms Act and Title II of the Gun Control Act of 1968. Their STAG-15 is a semi-automatic AR-15 marketed for civilian use and is chambered for 5.56×45mm NATO, 6.8mm Remington SPC & .300 Blackout, in addition to standard barrel lengths, it is also available in SBR carbine lengths of 14.5", 12.5" & 10.5". The STAG-16 has the same caliber and barrel length options as the STAG-15, but the STAG-16 is a select fire version that can be toggled between semi-auto, burst fire and full-auto fire modes, and is marketed only to law enforcement and the military.

On June 7, 2019, Stag Arms announced relocating their headquarters from New Britain, Connecticut to Cheyenne, Wyoming, having completed their move on December 17, 2019.

== Controversies ==
In December 2015, Stag Arm's CEO Mark Malkowski pleaded guilty to manufacturing hundreds of unserialized firearms, including dozens of rifles. The ATF required the CEO to divest all interest in Stag Arms.
