= Mike Schmidt (lawyer) =

American attorney and prosecutor

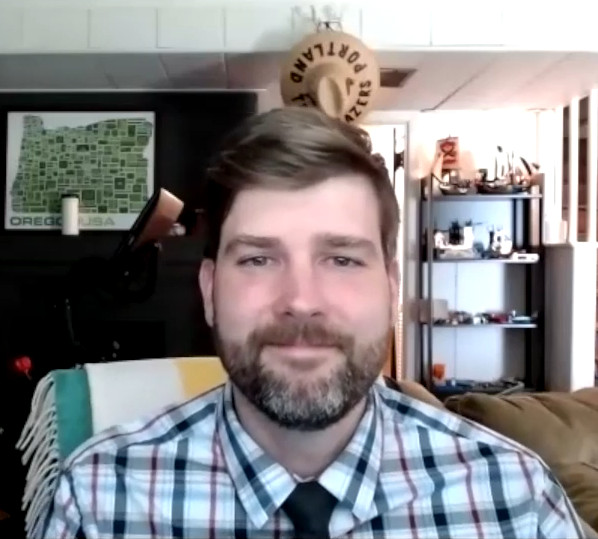
- Schmidt in 2020

District Attorney of Multnomah County
- In office August 1, 2020 – January 1, 2025
- Preceded by: Rod Underhill
- Succeeded by: Nathan Vasquez

Personal details
- Born: 1980 or 1981 (age 44–45) Weedsport, New York, U.S.
- Party: Democratic
- Education: Vassar College (AB); Lewis and Clark College (JD)

Michael Schmidt (born 1980/1981) is an American attorney and a progressive prosecutor. He served as the Multnomah County District Attorney from August 2020 to January 2025. Originally set to begin his term on January 1, 2021, Governor Kate Brown appointed him to the job early, in August 2020, to replace Rod Underhill, who retired in July. Schmidt was succeeded by Nathan Vasquez on January 1, 2025 at the end of his term after conceding loss in the primary election in May 2024.

== Early career ==
In 2003, Schmidt graduated from Vassar College with a bachelor's degree in political science. He then spent two years in New Orleans through Teach for America. In 2005, Schmidt moved to Portland, Oregon to attend Lewis & Clark Law School. Initially interested in environmental law, Schmidt enjoyed criminal law as a student and interned for then-Multnomah County District Attorney Mike Schrunk. Schmidt graduated with a Juris Doctor in 2008 before becoming a Deputy District Attorney in Multnomah County, Oregon.

In 2013, Schmidt left the District Attorney's office and became counsel for the Oregon House and Senate Judiciary Committees. In 2015, then-Governor John Kitzhaber appointed Schmidt as Executive Director of the Oregon Criminal Justice Commission.

== District attorney ==
In 2020, Schmidt announced that he would run for Multnomah County District Attorney. Then-District Attorney Rod Underhill did not seek reelection. Schmidt ran against Assistant U.S. Attorney Ethan Knight, who earned Underhill's endorsement. During the campaign, Schmidt was endorsed by many top Oregon Democrats, including Tina Kotek, Earl Blumenauer, and Jo Ann Hardesty. Schmidt defeated Knight with a 76.6% vote.

Schmidt represents a progressive view towards prosecutions and criminal justice reform, preferring alternatives to prison, against trial as an adult for juveniles, for police accountability, against mandatory sentencing, and against the death penalty. Since a DA has the power to decide who to prosecute, his stance can influence local and statewide cases to counter what has been described the "irrationality of our system" of biased prosecution using data-driven outcomes.

Days after the election results, on June 16, 2020, Rod Underhill resigned his position immediately, to the surprise of Schmidt. Underhill noted the changing environment with police violence, Black Lives Matter, and George Floyd protests. The Portland Mercury noted that Underhill's resignation was less than a week after the resignation of Portland Police Chief Jami Resch.

Governor Kate Brown appointed Schmidt to fill the seat on July 7, 2020. The following day, the president of Multnomah County Prosecuting Attorneys Association resigned. Mike Schmidt took office on August 1, 2020.

Announced formation of a "Justice Integrity Unit" on September 1, 2021, and dedicated $524,387 to staff the effort to examine wrongful convictions and review prison sentences for people serving time. Ernest Warren, who founded the first Black-owned defense law firm in Oregon, will lead the unit.

In what the Oregonian called a "change of tone", he said, following protests in April 2022, “The violence and property destruction we’ve seen in Portland nearly 11 months is unacceptable,” said Schmidt. “As district attorney, I will always defend a person’s right to free speech but I will not defend, nor support anyone who knowingly or recklessly or intentionally destroys property or engages in violence.”

Long time prosecutor Amber Kinney resigned January 10, 2022, with a 7-page letter criticizing his leadership, saying that progress, especially for women, has been "set back decades".

In an opinion piece published March 27, 2022, in the Oregonian, Schmidt complained about a 300% increase in case count and 150 felony cases that cannot be prosecuted without violating the Constitution, for lack of a public defender. A circuit court judge had recently dismissed three felony cases including serious domestic violence. He admits to a prosecution rate of 7 of 10 burglaries referred by the police, who in turn refer only 10 of 100 burglaries reported, and he did not mention a conviction rate in the article.

=== George Floyd / Breonna Taylor protests ===
Schmidt gained notoriety shortly after taking office for refusing to prosecute people who were arrested participating in the George Floyd protests unless there is "deliberate property damage, theft, or threat of force." Of the 550 cases referred by police as of August 10, including 417 misdemeanors and 133 felonies, Schmidt planned to prosecute only 47 cases, all felonies. In an August 11 announcement Schmidt characterized the policy as "recognizing the right to speak" while emphasizing that it was not a free pass to commit acts of violence. A notable case where charges were dropped was against Demetria Hester, a leader in the Wall of Moms movement.

In an open letter published on August 7, Portland Police Association president Daryl Turner called on both Schmidt and mayor Ted Wheeler to "step up and do your job", calling their operational direction "insane" and describing Schmidt's platform of police accountability as "a thinly veiled threat to indict police officers". In a meeting, a police officer reportedly told Schmidt "I don’t trust anything you do or say because you’re antifa." Turner also stated that Schmidt was "George Soros-backed", though a union representative denied that he said that. An activist described the law enforcement responses as "lashing out", and another described it as political spin. Schmidt stated that he thought it was ironic that police criticized his office for dropping minor infractions while their own officers ignored crimes committed by armed white supremacists.

On September 4, 2020, Patriot Prayer leader Joey Gibson and a supporter sued Schmidt, seeking an injunction to halt their prosecution for inciting a riot between left and right wing protestors at Cider Riot in 2019. In the suit, Gibson alleged selective prosecution based on political beliefs after Schmidt refused to drop his own riot charge despite dropping other charges for George Floyd protesters. The case was later dismissed.

=== Gun violence ===
In a press conference with other Multnomah County leaders on September 23, 2021, Schmidt told victims of gun violence that "help is on the way" before announcing a $1 million investment from the county for added prosecutors and investigators devoted to homicides. This is the first investment for added prosecutors in the Multnomah County District Attorney's Office in decades. The announcement was coupled with a plan for collaboration between public health and public safety agencies, "The old war on crime approach to public safety, which leans almost exclusively on law enforcement, prosecution and punishment is both ineffective and causes profound long-term harm, especially on communities of color," County Chair Deborah Kafoury said at the press conference in reference to the County's 21st-century approach to addressing gun violence.

=== Drug decriminalization ===
Schmidt endorsed Ballot Measure 110 in 2020, which removed criminal penalties for possession of small amounts of all drugs. On December 17, after voters approved the measure, Schmidt announced he would implement the changes immediately, several months before the measure took effect statewide on February 1, 2021.

In late 2023, as polling showed declining public support for Measure 110 and multiple groups began efforts to repeal the measure, Schmidt continued to oppose criminal penalties for simple possession. Instead, he advocated for proposals to criminalize public consumption of drugs and to make it easier to prosecute drug dealers.

On February 26, 2024, Schmidt testified in support of a proposal by the Oregon Legislative Assembly to reinstate criminal penalties for possession of hard drugs. Citing the recent impact of fentanyl, Schmidt stated that “we can approach addiction as the health issue it is, while also holding people accountable.”

=== Reelection loss ===
On May 21, 2024, Multnomah County hosted its primary election to elect a district attorney. Schmidt ran for reelection and was challenged by Nathan Vasquez, a senior Multnomah County prosecutor who was Schmidt's subordinate. Vasquez received 53.3% of votes while Schmidt received 46.3%. Because Vasquez received a simple majority of votes, he was declared the winner and no general election was held. Schmidt was replaced by Vasquez as Multnomah County district attorney on January 1, 2025.

== Later career ==
After losing his bid for reelection as Multnomah County district attorney, Schmidt became general counsel of the Urban League of Portland, a civil rights organization. In May 2025, he debuted a podcast, "The Schmidt Show," with the goal of "uplifting community news, events, and voices."

== Personal life ==
Schmidt lives in Southeast Portland. He is married to Clare Schmidt.

== Published works ==
- Schmidt, Mike (March 27, 2022). "Opinion: A system in crisis puts safety at risk". oregonlive. the Oregonian.
- Multnomah County prosecutor resigned over what she described as the failed leadership of District Attorney Mike Schmidt https://www.documentcloud.org/documents/21180898-kinney-resignation-letter

== See also ==
- Normandale Park shooting
