= Richard Laurence Marquette =

American serial killer

Richard Marquette
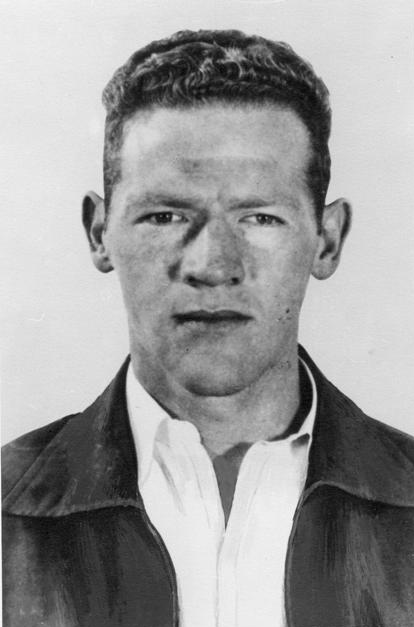
- Born: December 12, 1934 (age 91); Portland, Oregon, U.S.
- Status: Incarcerated
- Convictions: First degree murder; Murder (2 counts)
- Penalty: Life imprisonment

Details
- Victims: 3
- Span of crimes: 1961–1975
- Country: United States
- State: Oregon

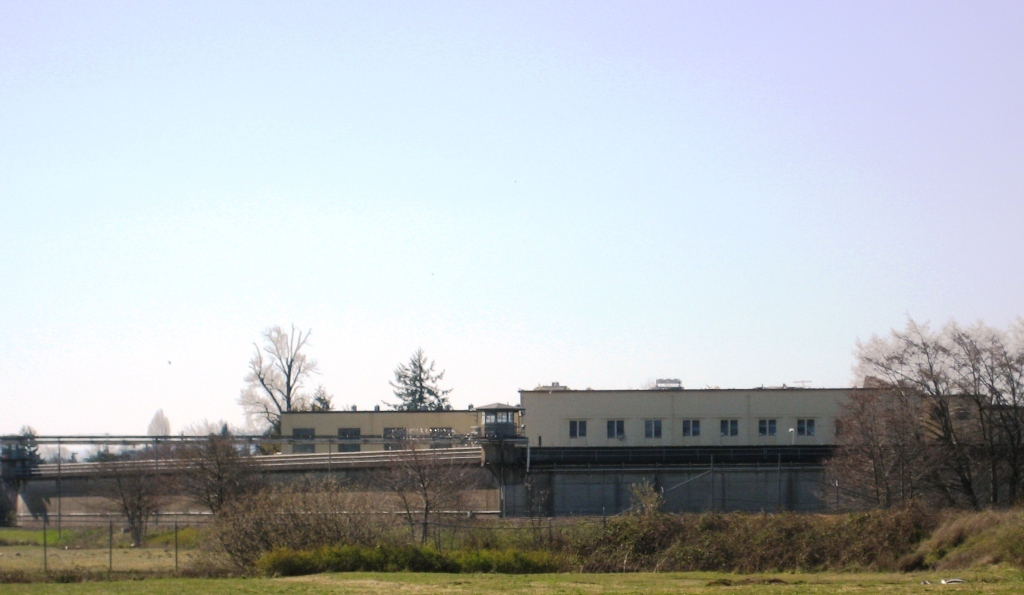
The Oregon State Penitentiary has held Marquette for over 40 years. He is not eligible for parole.

Richard Lawrence Marquette (also known as Dick Marquette; born December 12, 1934) is an American serial killer who killed three women, drained their blood, mutilated and dismembered their bodies, and scattered their remains between 1961 and 1975. He was the first person to be added as an eleventh name on the FBI Ten Most Wanted List, in connection with the 1961 murder of Joan Caudle in Portland, Oregon. He is currently incarcerated at Snake River Correctional Institution.

== Personal background ==
Richard Laurence (Lawrence) Marquette was born on December 12, 1934, in Portland, Oregon.

== Murders ==
=== Joan Caudle ===
On June 8, 1961, Portland police received a phone call from a local housewife whose dog had brought home a human foot in a paper bag. While detectives were at the woman's house investigating, the dog returned again, this time with a hand. The area was then subject to a thorough search which uncovered several more body parts, all fresh and bled dry, with no attempt to bury them. The foot definitely belonged to a woman and had bright red nail polish on the toes, which were also slightly webbed. An autopsy on the remains found that the veins and arteries were completely drained of blood and that it had happened shortly after death, ruling out the possibility that this was a buried corpse someone had dug up and dismembered.

Police scanned through missing persons reports and first investigated that of a runaway teenager who lived with her aunt. The aunt said that her niece did not have webbed toes, nor was she in the habit of wearing nail polish. Moreover, her shoes were much too small to fit the dead woman's foot.

The next report involved Joan Caudle, a 23-year-old Portland housewife and mother of two children who'd been reported missing by her husband. Mr. Caudle was the most immediate suspect, so investigators questioned him carefully. He said that she was out shopping for Father's Day gifts when she vanished. Although her husband said she was not a habitual drinker, she had been depressed as of late because her mother was gravely ill and so it was entirely plausible she might have stopped in a bar.

They asked if it was possible that his wife might be seeing another man, but he said she could not possibly have time for that with having to care for two small children, nor was she the sort who would do such a thing. When Caudle's husband was asked if she had webbed toes, he admitted that he'd never paid that close attention to her feet and couldn't say. He added that she did not drive a car and would have used a bus or taxi to travel around town. An examination of the shoes in Caudle's closet found that they were the correct size for the foot.

Police then found a witness, a local woman who was a habitual barfly and had a string of arrests for public drunkenness and disorder. She said she'd been in a bar on the evening of June 7 and met a man who told her his name was Marquette. By her account, the two were hitting it off well when another woman approached and took his attention instead. After police showed her a photograph of Joan Caudle, the woman said that was definitely the same individual from the bar, adding that she was lucky she hadn't been the one to go home with Marquette.

Police found his residence, a tiny house resembling a shack, but there was no one inside. They discovered neatly-chopped up human body parts wrapped in newspaper inside the refrigerator. Also found inside were bloodstained lingerie. The only significant missing piece was her head.

An arrest warrant was issued and a manhunt began. Oregon Governor Mark Hatfield called the crime "the most heinous in Oregon history" and appealed to the FBI for help and the agency took the unusual step of expanding their most wanted list to eleven names, the first time it had ever done so. The tactic worked; Marquette was arrested in California the day after being added to the list. He put up no resistance and seemed almost relieved at his arrest. A background check found that he had two previous arrests, in June 1956 for attempted rape, and in August 1957 when he robbed a Portland gas station and spent a year in jail.

Marquette claimed that he was in a bar when he saw Caudle accompanied by another man, but she recognized him from elementary school and walked over to him. They had a few drinks, went around to several more bars, according to his account, and then came back to his house where his former classmate drank more beer with him and allegedly agreed to sex. When investigators asked what happened next, he claimed that the two had sex, then got into an argument afterward, whereupon Marquette choked Caudle to death. Since he had no vehicle to dispose of her remains, he panicked and dragged the corpse into the shower where he dismembered it.

From everything the investigators found about Caudle, Marquette's story seemed quite unbelievable, but he was the only living witness to the crime. The prosecution asked for him to be charged with rape as well since they did not believe that the two had consensual sex. When asked what became of Joan Caudle's head, Marquette led police to a river bank near Oaks Park in Portland where it was fished out of some rotting timber along the edge of the water. He was found guilty of first degree murder, but was spared execution after the jury recommended leniency. Marquette, who muttered "Thank God" upon hearing the recommendation, was sentenced to life in prison. After an 11-year sentence during which time he was described as "a model prisoner", he received parole in 1973.

=== Betty Wilson ===
In April 1975, a fisherman discovered mutilated human remains floating in a shallow slough in Marion County, Oregon. Once again, the corpse had been bled dry, savagely mutilated, and dismembered before being dumped with only a minimal effort at concealment. All major parts of the victim were found there and retrieved except the genitals, which were missing and ultimately never located. Detectives determined the remains were those of 35-year-old Betty Wilson, a North Carolina native who'd led a hard life of poverty and had 7 children since marrying at the age of 16.

Wilson and her husband lived for a time in an abandoned school bus at the edge of the city dump with no electricity or running water, and she claimed that her husband was abusive. With all of her children in foster care, Wilson stowed away in the back seat of her sister's car one day to begin a new life far away from North Carolina and had been living with her in Salem. She had last been seen alive at a crowded nightclub. Wilson's husband was the initial and obvious suspect, but it was quickly verified that he'd been working in North Carolina at the time and could not possibly be responsible for a murder that happened on the other side of the country.

Marquette thus became the prime suspect. Detectives began a stakeout of his home and obtained a search warrant. They searched both inside and outside the mobile home where Marquette was living and uncovered several small but damning pieces of physical evidence that tied him to the murder of Betty Wilson. Fifty-five hours after the first remains were found, Marquette was once again arrested for murder. Given the overwhelming physical evidence and the close similarity to the Caudle murder, Marquette pleaded guilty to the Wilson murder.

His story was similar to the one he'd used earlier; that he brought Wilson back to her house, and she agreed to sex, but then refused, after which he strangled and dismembered her. Despite the near-surgical precision with which he dismembered his victims, Marquette stated that he was not a hunter, nor did he have any formal training as a butcher. While he claimed that he chopped up Joan Caudle because he didn't have a car to dispose of her body, this time he had a more than adequate pickup truck, yet he still decided to dismember Betty Wilson.

Although Marquette would not say it in so many words, investigators clearly could tell that it was part of his obsession. He was sentenced in May to life imprisonment with no possibility of parole. Criminal psychiatrists working with Marquette came to the conclusion that he was a perfectly normal, socially adjusted individual unless women turned him down. The sting of rejection, they concluded, set off a murderous rage. He has been incarcerated at the Oregon State Penitentiary since June 1975.

=== Jane Doe ===
While confessing to the murder of Betty Wilson, Marquette also confessed to another murder in the same style in 1974. He picked up a woman at a bar, convinced her to come to his home, and proceeded to choke her to death, mutilate, and dismember her corpse. Marquette led detectives to two shallow graves where he had disposed of the bulk of the remains, but the head was never located and as the remains were mostly skeletal, there was no way the woman could be identified. Marquette said that he didn't know her name and since he never heard anything more about it, he figured that nobody missed her. Her identity remains unknown.

== See also ==
- List of serial killers in the United States
