= Normandale Park =

Public park in Portland, Oregon, U.S.

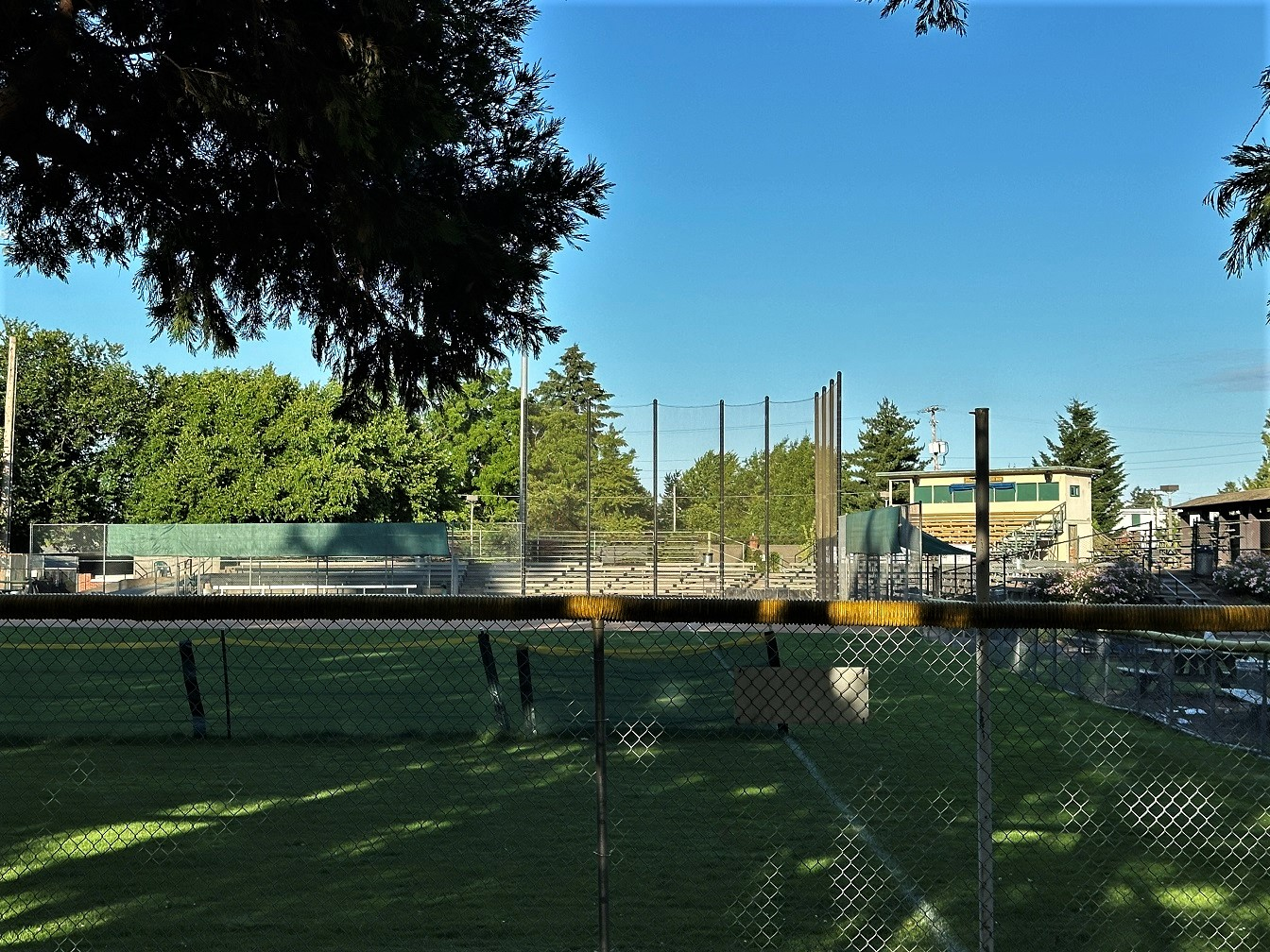
- Erv Lind Stadium
- Interactive map of Normandale Park
- Location: NE 57th Ave. and Halsey St. Portland, Oregon
- Coordinates: 45°31′58″N 122°36′21″W
- Area: 13.69 acres (5.54 ha)
- Operator: Portland Parks & Recreation
- Normandale Field
- U.S. National Register of Historic Places
- Built: 1948
- NRHP reference No.: 100010362
- Added to NRHP: May 20, 2024

Normandale Park is a 13.69-acre (5.54 ha) public park in Portland, Oregon's Rose City Park neighborhood, in the United States. The park was acquired in 1940, shortly after the closure of Normandale elementary school on the same site. The park was still under development as of 1947. The park's existence, as well as that of Laurelhurst Park, was cited in an announced plan to reduce the size of a nearby playground. In 2010 one of the city's earliest dog parks dedicated to dogs under 25 pounds (or frail or elderly) was established at Normandale.

== Erv Lind Stadium ==
The park is the site of Erv Lind Stadium, a softball and baseball facility named for Erwin "Erv" Lind in 1964. Lind coached the Erv Lind Florists, a women's fast-pitch softball team based at Normandale Park, from 1937 until his death in 1964; the team won the ASA Softball national tournament twice, in 1944 and again in 1964, along with many state and regional championships. In their 28 years the Florists never had a losing season, and the team retained Lind's name for several years following his death. The stadium was listed on the National Register of Historic Places in 2024 under its original name, Normandale Field.

== Normandale school ==
The Normandale elementary school that previously occupied the land was closed in the 1935-36 school year. One of its buildings, described as "portable," was moved to Jefferson High School in 1935.

In 1930 Cora E. Felt, a Portland schoolteacher of more than three decades, resigned following accusations from at least 26 parents of her having imposed extreme corporal punishment on her students. Principal Kate E. Young was also implicated, though she may not have faced specific repercussions.

== See also ==
- National Register of Historic Places listings in Northeast Portland, Oregon
