= Oregon Criminal Justice Commission =

The Oregon Criminal Justice Commission (CJC) is a nine-member volunteer commission in the U.S. state of Oregon. It was established in 1995, charged with providing a "centralized and impartial forum for statewide policy development and planning" in order to "improve the efficiency and effectiveness of state and local criminal justice systems."

Like many other commissions, the CJC's members are appointed by the Governor of Oregon and approved by the Oregon State Senate. It was brought into existence by an act of the 1995 session of the Oregon Legislative Assembly, and its statutory authority is defined in Chapter 137 of the Oregon Revised Statutes.

== See also ==
- Oregon Department of Corrections
- Oregon Ballot Measure 11 (1994)
