= Rod Underhill (district attorney) =

Rod Underhill was the Multnomah County District Attorney from 2012 to 2020. He ran unopposed in 2012, having been endorsed by his predecessor Mike Schrunk. Unopposed again in 2016, he resigned the office to Mike Schmidt after the George Floyd protests in Portland, Oregon began, shortly before his term was about to expire.
