= Mike Schrunk =

American lawyer (1942–2023)

Michael D. Schrunk
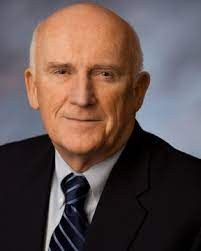

District attorney of Multnomah County, Oregon
- In office January 1981 – December 31, 2012
- Succeeded by: Rod Underhill

Personal details
- Born: February 28th, 1942 Portland, Oregon, U.S.
- Died: January 30, 2023 (aged 80)

Michael D. Schrunk (February 28, 1942 – January 30, 2023) was an American attorney who served as district attorney of Multnomah County, Oregon, United States from 1981 until 2012. He is believed to have been the longest-serving district attorney in the state of Oregon.

In 1981, after eight narcotics officers of the Portland Police Bureau were implicated for misconduct, Schrunk, sought pardons from the governor for 58 people convicted.

In 1985, a Portland police officer killed Lloyd Stevenson, a black man, using a chokehold. It was ruled a homicide while under Schrunk's investigation, but a grand jury convened by Schrunk declined to indict either of the officers involved, citing the wording used in the homicide ruling as insufficiently definitive. Simultaneous with Stevenson's funeral, two officers sold T-shirts to fellow officers that read "Don't Choke Em, Smoke Em". The two officers were fired, but later reinstated by a union arbitrator.

Schrunk's office prosecuted three men for beating and killing Ethiopian national Mulugeta Seraw in Southeast Portland in 1988. Schrunk described them as members of East Side White Pride, which he stated was the largest skinhead group in the state.

In 1989, Schrunk called on Multnomah county to devote more funds to drug use and gangs.

Programs championed by Schrunk have been replicated across the country. He played a part in launching the nation's second drug court; twenty years later, there were 2500 such courts in the United States.

In 2002, Willamette Week searched through the trash of Schrunk, then-mayor of Portland Vera Katz and then-chief of Portland police Mark Kroeker, for a story in response to a controversial police decision endorsing the search of citizens' trash during investigations. Of the three targets, only Schrunk responded with grace and good humor. A 2019 Oregon Supreme Court ruling which referenced the story established that privacy rights do in fact extend to an individual's trash. In 2003, a star witness of Schrunk's ended up imprisoned himself, in a bizarre and complex case that is regarded as a blemish on Schrunk's record.

By 2009, Schrunk was regarded as the most influential politician in Multnomah county. That power was exemplified by his open refusal to try cases before a specific judge he believed was too sympathetic to suspects. In 2010, due to budget constraints, he made a controversial decision to no longer treat a number of illegal acts as crimes.

Schrunk never sought higher office. Upon his retirement in 2012, Schrunk endorsed Rod Underhill, who was elected to the office unopposed in 2012 and 2016.

== Early life ==
Mike Schrunk was born into a politically active family in Portland in 1942. Schrunk's father, Terry Schrunk, was elected Sheriff of Multnomah County in 1949. Subsequently, he was elected mayor of Portland four times, from 1957 to 1972.

Mike Schrunk attended Roosevelt High School, where he was a star athlete, ultimately being inducted into the Portland Interscholastic League Hall of Fame for football, basketball, and baseball. After high school he continued to play basketball and football at Portland State College. Schrunk was named as an Oregon Collegiate Conference all-league football player in 1963. He was the starting quarterback on the Portland State's conference champion team that year.

While at Portland State he also excelled at basketball. Today at Portland State University there is a scholarship given in his name called “The Mike Schrunk Scholar-Athlete of the Year.

After graduating from Portland State College in 1964, Schrunk attended the University of Oregon Law School. He graduated in 1967. He excelled in school and was on the school's law review.

Following law school, Schrunk was commissioned in the United States Marine Corps and served in Vietnam at the height of the war. He was discharged as a captain in 1970.

== Early legal career ==
Following his time in the Marine Corps, Schrunk became a deputy district attorney in the MCDA's office from 1970 to 1977. He was assigned largely to felony prosecutions and eventually responsible for administering all the homicide cases in the office. Among his most significant cases was his 1975 conviction of Colin Hockings for the widely publicized bludgeoning murder of a married couple and two children.

In 1977, Schrunk went into private practice representing clients in civil litigation and criminal defense. In 1980, while still in private practice, he was appointed as a special prosecutor by Oregon Attorney General's Office to investigate and prosecute corruption charges against Gary Gortmaker, the District Attorney of Marion County, Oregon. Schrunk obtained indictments and convictions against Gortmaker.

== Multnomah County District Attorney (MCDA) ==
In 1980, Schrunk was elected to the office of Multnomah County District Attorney. He became the district attorney in January 1981.

=== The SID Scandal ===
Upon assuming office, Schrunk inherited a significant police scandal involving a Portland Police Bureau drug unit (Special Investigations Department, or SID). In May, 1980 it was discovered that members of the SID unit may have been planting drugs, falsifying affidavits, perjuring themselves in court and stealing undercover money. Compounding the scandal was an incident of a police officer who had been shot to death during the service of search warrant on a biker gang residence when the police were attempting to plant drugs in the location.

Immediately upon assuming office Schrunk formed an independent task force to address the scandal, which was under his exclusive control. It was made up of two veteran homicide detectives, and two senior deputy district attorneys. Ultimately five officers were dismissed from the Police Bureau, one was convicted and served a prison term. In addition, 59 convictions were overturned, 35 pending cases dismissed upon motions of the District Attorney's Office and a Manslaughter I conviction was set aside.

The American Civil Liberties Union (ACLU) awarded Schrunk the Civil Liberties Award for his actions in the SID scandal.

=== Innovations in Justice System Administration ===
Throughout his long tenure in office, Schrunk was a leading national advocate for specialized programs, which more effectively addressed criminal conduct. Among the programs pioneered by the District Attorney's office under Schrunk were:

==== Drug Courts ====
In 1991, Multnomah County was the second jurisdiction in the nation to institute a drug treatment court, designed to induce drug users to obtain treatment rather than to merely convict them of drug

possession. Offenders who completed treatment had their cases dismissed and any record expunged. The program was considered a national model which has since been duplicated across the nation.

==== Neighborhood prosecution ====
In 1990, Schrunk established the Neighborhood District Attorney Program. The program placed experienced deputy district attorneys in small offices in communities experiencing high levels of “maintenance and order” crimes, misdemeanors such as prostitution, car break-ins, theft, and street level drug dealing. The successes of the program in dealing with quality-of-life crimes

became a national model for community prosecution.

==== Domestic violence ====
The Multnomah County District Attorney's Office was one of the first offices in the nation to establish a unit dedicated solely to the prosecution of domestic violence offenses. Beginning in 1989, the unit handled all domestic violence crimes in the county, and served as the central organizational unit for domestic violence coordination among law enforcement agencies in the county. He pioneered a specialty court for domestic violence.

==== Victims' rights ====
Like most states, Oregon moved to expand the rights of crime victims in the 1980s and 1990s. The Multnomah County District Attorney's Office was a leader in this effort. Schrunk and his office worked with the legislature, and victims’ rights groups to establish significant statutory and constitutional rights for crime victims. In 1986, his office drafted a victims’ rights initiative, which was passed by voters by an overwhelming majority (75%).

==== The Multidisciplinary Child Abuse Team (MDT) ====
In November 1989, Schrunk convened a policy group composed of Children's Services Division, Portland Police Bureau, Multnomah County Sheriff's Office, Juvenile Court,

Gresham Police Department, CARES NW, local hospitals, area schools, and the Multnomah County Health Division to develop interim protocols for how the county dealt with child abuse under the supervision of his Chief Deputy in charge of his Family Justice Division. Based on the protocols established by the policy group, in March 1990, the Multidisciplinary Child Abuse Team (MDT) began operation to ensure that child victims coming into the criminal justice system would be protected at every step in the system. In addition, both the police and the prosecutors developed the expertise to process these cases much better.

==== Community Courts ====
In 1986 Schrunk visited the recently opened Midtown Manhattan Community Court. The concept was to place misdemeanor courts within certain communities and then find community solutions as part of the sentence. Schrunk saw the potential in replicating the project in Portland. His efforts resulted in the establishment of the North/Northeast Community Court

in March 1998, the second oldest community court in the country. Two other courts followed, the South/Southeast Community Court in Feb. 2000 and the Downtown/Westside Community Court in April 2001. In 2003, a fourth was opened in Gresham, Oregon, which is in the eastern part of the county.

== Significant cases ==
=== Mulugeta Seraw ===
On November 13, 1988, Mulugeta Seraw, an Ethiopian immigrant, was beaten to death in a Portland park by three white nationalist skinhead members of the White Aryan Resistance (WAR), a California white supremacist organization. The three offenders were convicted and sentenced to lengthy prison sentences. As a result of the convictions, Morris Dees of the Southern Poverty Law Center won a $12.5 million verdict against the White Aryan Resistance and its leader Tom Metzger, resulting in a forfeiture of significant assets of the organization.

=== Tonya Harding ===
In January 1994, U.S. figure skater Tonya Harding and her then-husband Jeff Gilooly were involved in an attack on Harding's U.S. skating teammate Nancy Kerrigan, designed to keep Kerrigan from competing against Harding in the February 1994 Winter Olympics. Harding later accepted a plea bargain in which she pleaded guilty to conspiracy to hinder prosecution. As a result of her involvement in the aftermath of the assault on Kerrigan, the United States Figure Skating Association banned her for life.

=== “Happy Face” Killer ===
Keith Hunter Jesperson is a Canadian American serial killer who killed at least eight women while working as a truck driver. One of his victims was Taunja Bennett, whose body was found in early 1990 in a remote part of Multnomah County. Schrunk's office prosecuted and convicted Laverne Pavlinac and John Sosnovske, two individuals who were later determined to have had no connection to the case, based on a false confession by Pavlinac. Jesperson later confessed to the killings and plead guilty to the murder. Schrunk's office moved successfully to have Pavlinac's and Sosnovske's convictions overturned, despite initial opposition by the court. The case received significant national press, leading to a film and several documentaries.

== Death ==
Schrunk died from complications from Alzheimer's disease on January 30, 2023, at the age of 80.
