= Hillcrest Youth Correctional Facility =

Juvenile correctional facility in Salem, Oregon

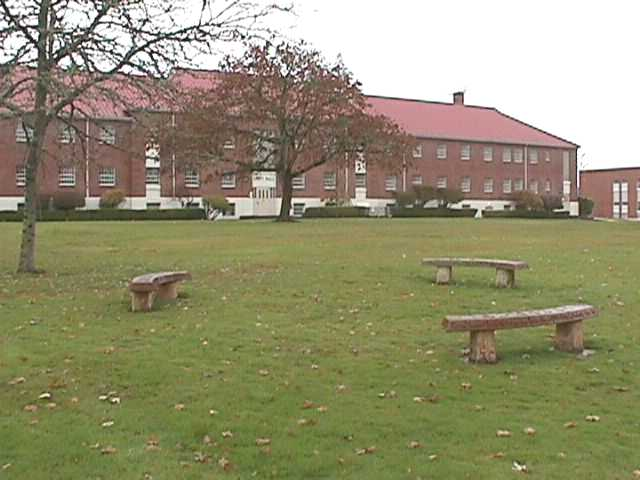
- Campus in 2000

- Location within Oregon
- Location: Salem, Oregon; 44°53′36″N 123°00′34″W
- Opened: 1914
- Closed: September 1, 2017
- Former name: State Industrial School for Girls
- Managed by: Oregon Youth Authority

Hillcrest Youth Correctional Facility was a state-run juvenile correctional facility located in Salem, Oregon, United States, established in 1914. Hillcrest was run by the Oregon Youth Authority (OYA), Oregon's juvenile corrections agency. It was closed on September 1, 2017, and all youth, staff, and programs were moved to MacLaren Youth Correctional Facility in Woodburn as part of a major project to consolidate the two facilities.

Hillcrest was originally founded as the State Industrial School for Girls, following the 1891 establishment of a boys' reformatory school. It later became co-gender in the 1970s, and served males ages 12–25 who were violent or in need of substance abuse treatment. The facility had a budgeted capacity of 180 beds. Hillcrest also served as the location for statewide male intake and parole violator intake assessment for youth offenders.

Robert S. Farrell High School was located on site.

== History ==
The facility originally opened as the State Industrial School for Girls in 1914. It was the state's first reform school for girls. A boys' facility was opened 1891, and concern was expressed that there was a need for a similar institution for "erring daughters". The girls' facility opened in 1913 in the old Polytechnic Building on the grounds of the Oregon School for the Deaf while Hillcrest was being built.

The school was renamed Hillcrest School for Girls, and later the Hillcrest School of Oregon. The facility became co-gender in the mid-1970s. Hillcrest became an all-male facility in 2008, when Oak Creek Youth Correctional Facility for female offenders was established in Albany.

== Oversight ==
For part of its history, Hillcrest was managed by the Oregon State Board of Control. Hillcrest was operated by the Oregon Department of Corrections (DOC) from 1965–1971. When the Children's Services Division in the Department of Human Resources (now the Oregon Department of Human Services) was created, it took over oversight of the facility from the DOC. In 1995, a bill was introduced in the Oregon State Legislature that would establish an independent department, the Oregon Youth Authority, to administer Oregon's youth correctional facilities. The bill became law that same year and the Oregon Youth Authority became a division of the Oregon Department of Human Resources. In 1996, the Oregon Youth Authority became an independent department of the State of Oregon.

== Notable residents ==
- Courtney Love Russell S Gaither 78-80

== See also ==
- Fairview Training Center
- Juvenile delinquency in the United States
- List of Oregon prisons and jails
- Mill Creek Correctional Facility
