= 1998 Thurston High School shooting =

Mass shooting in Oregon, US

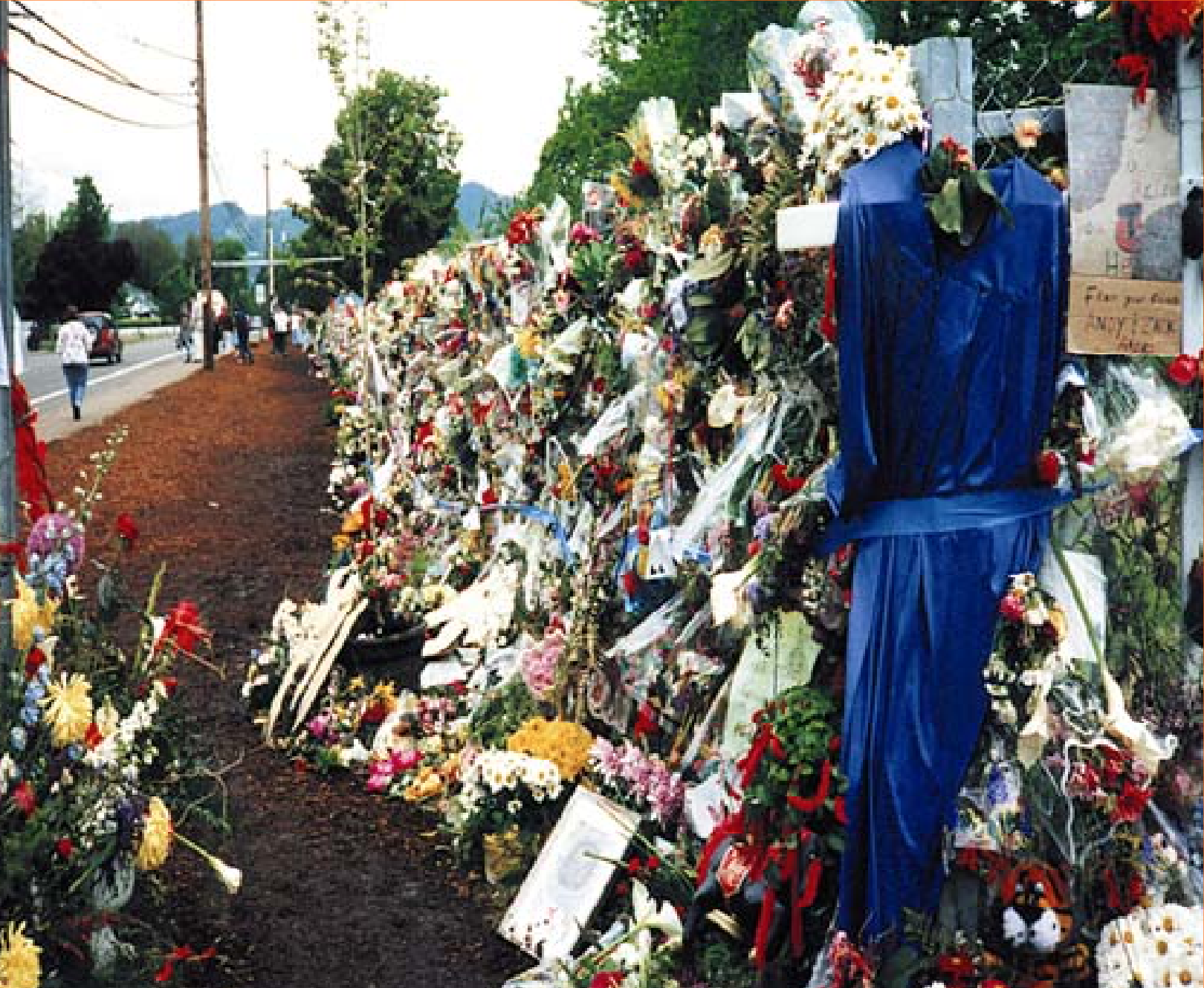
- The first memorial after the shooting
- Location: 44°02′58″N 122°55′29″W; Springfield, Oregon, U.S.
- Date: Murder of parents: May 20, 1998; Shooting: May 21, 1998; 7:55 a.m. (PDT; UTC-08:00)
- Target: Students and staff at Thurston High School
- Attack type: Spree killing; mass shooting; school shooting; mass murder; parricide
- Weapons: 9×19mm Glock 19 Gen2 semi-automatic pistol; Sawed-off .22LR Ruger 10/22 rifle; .22LR Ruger MK II pistol (unused); Two hunting knives (one used)
- Deaths: 4 (including the perpetrator's parents at home)
- Injuries: 25
- Perpetrator: Kipland Kinkel
- Defender: Jacob Ryker
- Verdict: Pleaded guilty
- Convictions: Murder (4 counts), attempted murder (26 counts) (Note: Four counts of aggravated murder and 26 counts of attempted aggravated murder dropped in a plea deal.)
- Sentence: 111 years imprisonment without the possibility of parole

On May 21, 1998, 15-year-old freshman student Kipland "Kip" Kinkel opened fire with a semi-automatic rifle in the cafeteria of Thurston High School in Springfield, Oregon, United States, killing two of his classmates and wounding 25 others. The day before, he had killed his parents at the family home, following his suspension pending an expulsion hearing after he admitted to school officials that he was keeping a stolen handgun in his locker. Fellow students subdued him, leading to his arrest. He later characterized his actions as an attempt to get others to kill him, since he wanted to take his own life after killing his parents but could not bring himself to.

During the year before the shooting, Kinkel displayed increasingly aberrant behavior and a heightened fascination with weapons and death, leading his parents to take him to a psychologist, who diagnosed Kinkel with major depressive disorder. Kinkel's parents had not disclosed any histories of mental illness in their families, and Kinkel himself had not told anyone about having heard voices urging him to violence since he was 12, out of fear of being ostracized or institutionalized. After the shooting, Kinkel pled guilty to murder and attempted murder and was sentenced to 111 years in prison without the possibility of parole under Oregon's Measure 11 passed four years earlier. It was the first time an Oregon juvenile received an effective life sentence without parole, a sentence upheld on appeals in both state and federal court. Currently incarcerated at Oregon State Correctional Institution in Salem, Kinkel has been diagnosed with paranoid schizophrenia and now takes antipsychotic medication. He has, with other juvenile offenders serving lengthy sentences in the state's prison system, organized advocacy efforts that have softened provisions of Measure 11 for future offenders.

The shooting made national news, as the latest in a series of school shootings over the previous year. Kinkel's crime was seen as more egregious than the earlier ones before since he had gone into a crowded internal space and indiscriminately opened fire with a semi-automatic rifle. President Bill Clinton spoke at the high school a month later about the issue. A memorial outside the school memorializes the two students killed.

Some survivors of the shooting continue to struggle with its physical and mental effects on them. One, Anthony W. Case, has said that his injuries led him to put more energy into scientific studies and a career in astrophysics and a key role in designing a tool for NASA's Parker Solar Probe. While survivors and their families have conceded they have more sympathy for Kinkel now that more is known about his life before the shootings, they still believe he should not be released.

== Background ==
=== Perpetrator ===
Kinkel's mugshot, 1998

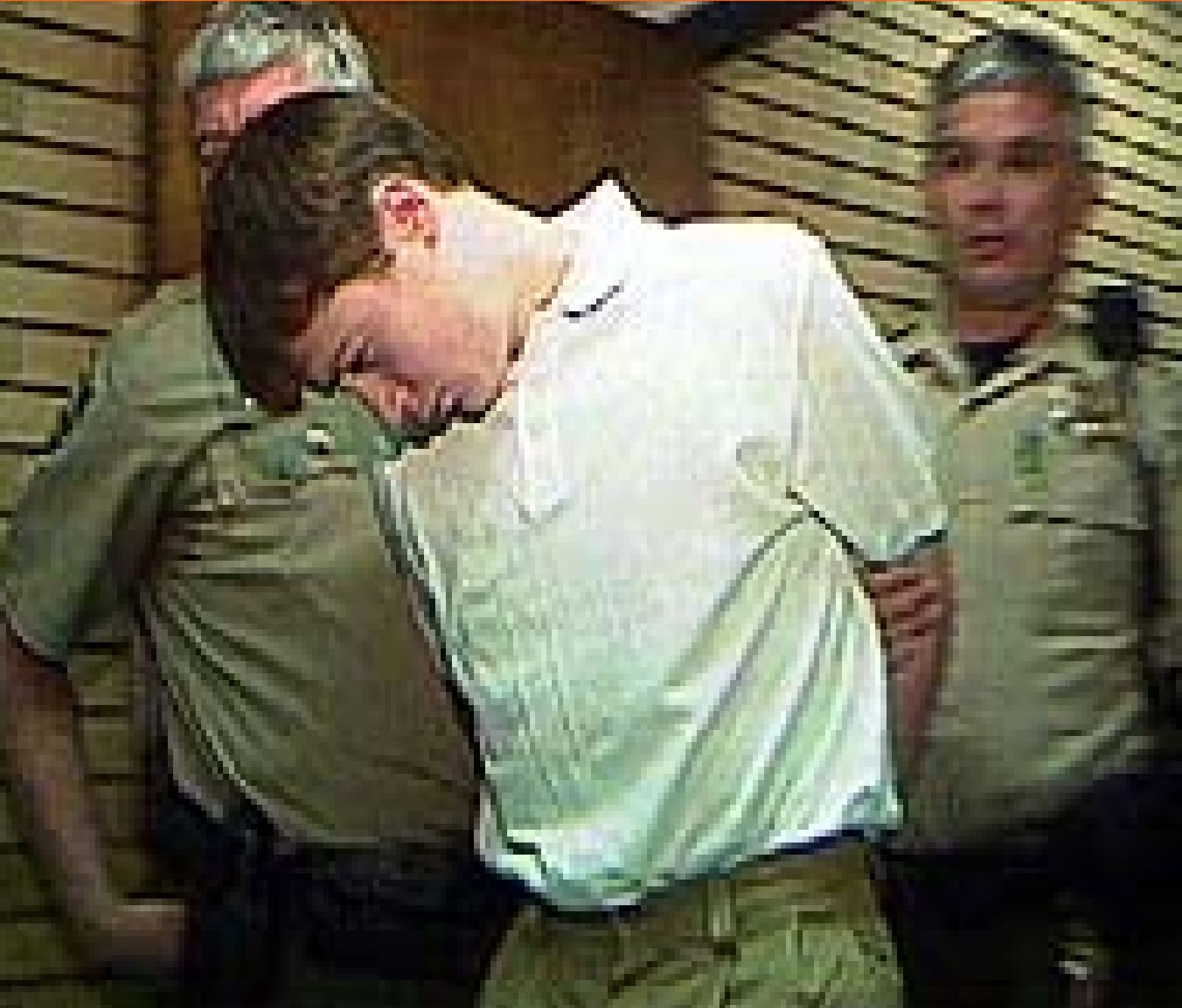
Kinkel being escorted by police officers

Kipland Phillip Kinkel (born August 30, 1982), known as "Kip", is the second child of William and Faith Kinkel (née Zuranski). His parents were Spanish language teachers; Faith at Springfield High School, and William had taught at Thurston High School and Lane Community College; William had retired three years before the shooting, while Faith was still working.

There was a history of serious mental illnesses in both sides of the family. Nine of Kinkel's relatives had mental illness severe enough to require their institutionalization. Faith and William withheld this from psychologists; investigators hired by Kip's lawyers uncovered it, including one uncle who had stabbed a state trooper after a traffic stop in the late 1940s, believing the man had killed his brother during the war. Faith Kinkel had herself been treated for depression with prescription antidepressants on two different occasions years apart. She was one of 30 on her side of the family, including all three of her sisters, who had either been diagnosed with mental illness or shown signs of it. William Kinkel had no history, but some of his reported behavior, such as keeping the house heating low enough in the winter months that the family had to put on outerwear while inside at night, suggests mental illness. It is unknown whether Faith knew the full extent of mental illness in her family history when she falsely told Jeffrey Hicks, the psychologist who later treated her son, that there was none.

According to all accounts, Kinkel's parents were normal and cared for their son. His older sister Kristin was reportedly a gifted student. The family spent a sabbatical year in Spain when Kip was six, where he attended a Spanish-speaking kindergarten. Kip reportedly attended in an "unnormal" way, and his family said that he struggled with the curriculum. When he returned to Oregon, he attended elementary school in the small community of Walterville, about 5 miles (8 km) east of Springfield. His teachers considered him immature and lacking physical and emotional development. Following the recommendation of his teachers, Kip's parents had him repeat the first grade. During that year, he was diagnosed with dyslexia, which became worse, and placed in extensive special education classes by the beginning of second grade.

Kip had an interest in firearms and explosives from an early age that grew in puberty; he began making bombs, mostly gasoline-based, and detonating them in a nearby quarry to assuage his anger. William initially wanted to discourage his son from violence, but later enrolled Kip in gun safety courses, buying him a 9mm Glock handgun and eventually a .22 caliber rifle at the age of 15. He also passed down a .22 single-shot rifle he had received at age 12 to his son. William told a friend that he believed Kip was going to get a gun "one way or another" and that supervising Kip's use of guns would allow him to channel them into a hobby. Faith initially disapproved of the purchases but relented when Kip's psychologist "gave her emotional permission to say yes." Kip and William used the guns for target shooting near their home.

Classmates at Thurston described Kinkel as strange and morbid. Others characterized him as psychotic or schizoid, enjoying the music of rock bands such as Nine Inch Nails, Rage Against the Machine, and Marilyn Manson. He constantly talked about committing acts of violence, telling friends that he wanted to join the U.S. Army after graduation to find out what it was like to kill someone. When asked about a family trip to Disneyland, he commented that he wanted to "punch Mickey Mouse in the nose." He once gave a "how-to" speech in bomb-making to his speech class and set off "stink bombs" in the lockers of classmates. Kinkel studied William Shakespeare's Romeo & Juliet in his English class. He related to the protagonists and became enamored with the 1996 modernized film adaptation, which featured heavy use of firearms.

Kinkel's parents enrolled him in anger management and had him evaluated by Hicks. Kinkel saw him over a period of six months in sessions with his mother (his father did not attend since, according to Kip's sister Kristin, William did not believe psychiatric treatment was very effective, likening it to chiropractic). Kip was diagnosed with depression and began a prescription for Prozac. Eight weeks later, Hicks and the Kinkels agreed that Kip was doing well enough to stop the sessions. However, Kip did not refill his Prozac prescription when it ran out in late 1997. In December, William Kinkel confided about Kip's problems to Dan Close, whom he had just met at the San Diego Airport, once he learned that Close specialized in antisocial behavior and juvenile delinquency. "I told Bill that raising kids is the toughest thing we'll ever do," Close said after the shooting. "And Bill said, 'If we survive.'"

A Thanksgiving 1997 incident had a great effect on Kinkel's psyche. He had left the house on his bicycle to get candy, which his parents did not typically keep in the house, from a gas station 5 mi (8.0 km) away. During the return trip, he saw a triangular warning sign in the road and kicked it as he passed, leaving it broken. After rounding a nearby bend, he saw a man outside a nearby trailer staring at him. The man drove up to Kinkel shortly afterwards in a truck with visible bullet holes and excoriated him for the vandalism. Kinkel apologized, but then the man took out a gun and demanded $40 to replace the sign. Kinkel had spent what money he had on the snack, so the man demanded his phone number. Kinkel gave him a false one, but for weeks afterward became paranoid and fearful that the man would become enraged, find out where he lived, and come to shoot his family, fears that were encouraged by the voices that were in his head. He began sleeping with the Glock loaded under his pillow. When William found out, he took the pistol away. Kinkel never returned to the gas station and began keeping the rifle nearby instead, as he could conceal it better.

The incident intensified Kinkel's paranoia. "Everything was a threat, everything was evil, everything was ugly", he recalled years later. Kinkel began to have paranoid delusions, believing that the government had implanted a computer chip in his brain and that the Chinese were going to invade the West Coast. He described three voices: "Voice A", who commanded Kinkel to commit violent acts, "Voice B", who repeated insulting and depressive statements about him, and "Voice C", who constantly echoed what A and B said. Kinkel felt angry at God for being subjected to these voices, and that it was Voice A who instigated the killing of his parents and the subsequent attack at the school.

Kinkel exhibited signs of paranoid schizophrenia, the full extent of which became apparent only after his trial. He had gone to great lengths to hide any symptoms due to a fear of being labelled abnormal or "mentally retarded", being disliked by girls, or being institutionalized. After the shooting, he told examining psychiatrists about how he would hear voices in his head since he had turned 12, which were so insistent that he considered self-harm to suppress them. Instead, he tried to drown them out by playing loud music on his headphones, and bike riding.

In January 1997, Kinkel kicked a large rock off a highway overpass, which then landed on a car passing underneath, damaging it. In response, Faith made her son memorize the Lord's Prayer. She told a friend she believed it would be beneficial.

=== Expulsion ===
On May 20, 1998, Kinkel was suspended after being found in possession of a loaded, stolen handgun on school grounds. A friend of Kinkel's had stolen the pistol from the father of another friend and arranged to sell the weapon, a Beretta Model 90 .32-caliber pistol, to Kinkel the night before, for $110 ($200 in 2025). Kinkel then put the gun, loaded with a nine-round magazine, in a paper bag and left it in his locker. When the gun's owner discovered the theft, he reported it to the police and supplied the names of students he believed might have stolen the firearm; Kinkel was not one of them. The school became aware of his possible involvement and questioned him. When he was checked for weapons, he reportedly stated: "Look, I'm gonna be square with you guys; the gun's in my locker." Kinkel was suspended pending an expulsion hearing, and he and the friend were arrested. Kinkel was released from police custody and driven home by his father, who told him he would be sent to military school if he did not improve his behavior. According to Kinkel, the two stopped at a Burger King to eat on the way home, where William left Kip to finish alone after telling his son "you disgust me". When his father lectured him while driving him home from the police station after the firearm incident, Kinkel said, the voices in his head were so loud that he was unable to hear his father.

== Shooting ==
=== Murder of parents ===
Shortly before his death, William had confided to a friend that he was "terrified" and had run out of options to help his son.

According to Kinkel's taped confession, at about 3 p.m. that day, he retrieved his Ruger .22-caliber semi-automatic rifle from his bedroom and ammunition from his parents' bedroom. After the voices in his head told him he had no choice but to kill his father, he then went to the kitchen, where he heard William on the phone with the Oregon National Guard asking about boot camp. He then shot his father once in the back of the head, before dragging his body into the bathroom and covering it with a sheet. When his mother arrived home at about 6:30 p.m., he met her in the garage, told her he loved her, then shot her six times: twice in the back of the head, three times in the face, and once in the heart, again as his auditory hallucinations directed him. He then dragged her body across the floor and covered it with a sheet. He was unable to sleep; the voices told him that now he had to "go to school and kill everybody. Look at what you've already done."

Throughout the early morning hours, Kinkel repeatedly played a recording of "Liebestod", the final dramatic aria from Wagner's opera Tristan und Isolde, on the family's sound system. The recording was featured in Romeo + Juliet and included in a soundtrack release for the film. When police arrived at the house, they found this "opera music" from the soundtrack playing loudly with the CD player set to continuous play. In a note Kinkel left on a coffee table in the living room, he described his motive for killing his parents thus: "I just got two felonies on my record. My parents can't take that! It would destroy them. The embarrassment would be too much for them. They couldn't live with themselves." But as the note continues, he attempts to describe his mental state: "My head just doesn't work right. God damn these VOICES inside my head. ... I have to kill people. I don't know why. ... I have no other choice."

=== School shooting ===
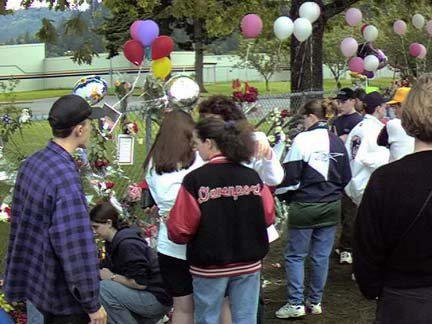
Students at memorial fence following shooting at Thurston HS in Springfield, Oregon in May 1998

On May 21, Kinkel drove his mother's Ford Explorer to the high school. He wore a trench coat to hide the five weapons he carried: two hunting knives, his rifle, a 9×19mm Glock 19 pistol, and a .22-caliber Ruger MK II pistol. He was carrying 1,127 rounds of ammunition.

Kinkel parked on 61st Street, two blocks from the school, then jogged to the campus, entered the patio area and fired two shots, fatally wounding 16-year-old Ben Walker and wounding another. He went to the cafeteria after turning down the hallway and, walking across it, fired the remaining 48 rounds from his rifle, wounding 24 of the 300 students present and killing 17-year-old Mikael Nickolauson. Kinkel fired a total of 51 rounds, 37 of which struck students.

When Kinkel pointed his rifle at the forehead of another student, Michael Crowley, and pulled the trigger, it clicked as he was out of ammunition. As he began to reload, wounded student Jacob Ryker saw his girlfriend, Jennifer Alldredge, lying wounded on the floor and said later that motivated him to act. Hearing Kinkel's weapon click, Ryker tackled him, assisted by his brother and several other students. Kinkel drew the Glock from his belt and fired one shot before he was disarmed, injuring Ryker, who had grabbed the pistol by the barrel in the belief its safety had been activated (Glock handguns do not have a manual safety). It had not, and Kinkel shot him again in the finger, as well as another student. Kinkel yelled "Just kill me!" at the students; they restrained him until the police arrived and arrested him. A total of seven students were involved in subduing and disarming Kinkel.

Nickolauson died at the scene; Walker died after being transported to the hospital and kept on life support until his parents arrived. The other students, including Ryker, were also taken to the hospital with a variety of wounds. Ryker had suffered a perforated lung, but he made a full recovery. Ryker was honored for his heroism. U.S. Representative Peter DeFazio, whose district included Springfield, came to visit him in the hospital and governor John Kitzhaber had a state trooper hand deliver a personal letter. A military veteran gave Ryker the Bronze Star he had been awarded. Ryker later received the Boy Scouts of America Honor Medal with Crossed Palms.

== Aftermath ==
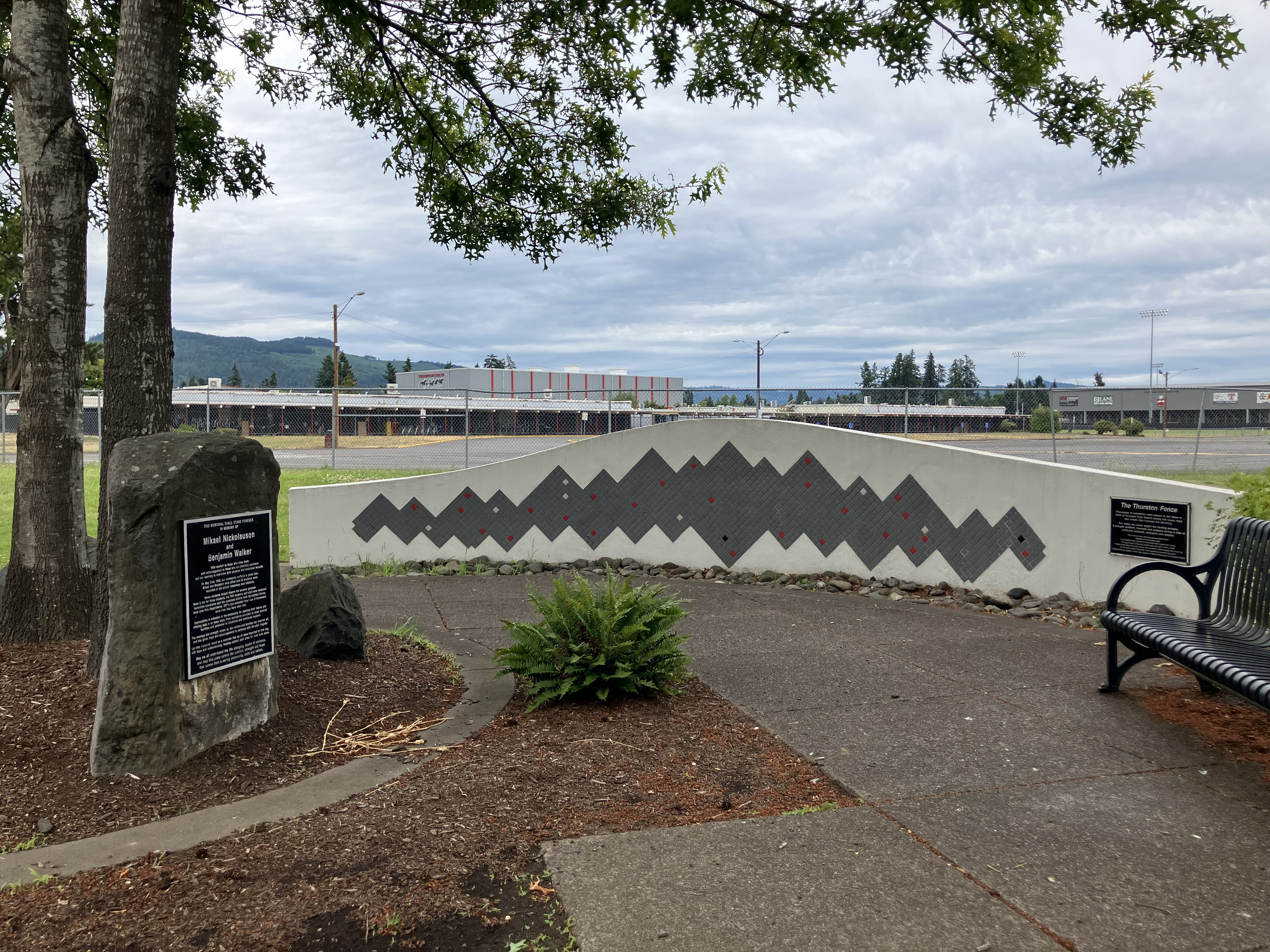
The memorial in June 2026

In the wake of the shooting, over 200 counselors volunteered and over $400,000 of aid money was given in the form of the Thurston Healing Fund. A scholarship was created for school graduates in remembrance of the shooting. In 2003, a permanent memorial was created and dedicated at the school in memory of the event. It has a curved wall and a plaque with the names of the two students killed; plans to also include Kinkel's parents' were dropped after debate.

The shooting made national news. Since the preceding October, there had been four other school shootings around the country. (Note: In Pearl, Mississippi; West Paducah, Kentucky; Jonesboro, Arkansas and Edinboro, Pennsylvania) While mass shootings had not been uncommon in the U.S., they had very rarely happened at schools. (Note: The most significant school shooting before had occurred in 1979, when a 16-year-old San Diego girl opened fire on students waiting to get into a school across the street from her house, killing a janitor and the principal) The earlier shootings had occurred outside schools or had involved pistols. Kinkel, by contrast, had entered the school with a semi-automatic rifle and opened fire on a crowded cafeteria. "Something like this was unimaginable at that point in time," recalled Peter DeFazio, who lived near the school and represented the area in the U.S. House of Representatives. Many of the students at the time still live in Springfield. Thurston's current dean of students, a friend who had to call Kristin Kinkel to let her know what had happened, considers the shooting "our 9/11".

Springfield adopted the slogan "Let it end here" in response to the tragedy. In June, President Bill Clinton spoke at the school, calling the shooting "a traumatic experience for all of America ... Everybody who has looked at you knows that this is a good community that they'd be proud to live in, and, therefore, it could happen anywhere."

== Legal proceedings ==
=== Jail ===
At the police station, Kinkel lunged at Officer Al Warthen with his knife, screaming, "Shoot me, kill me!" The officer repelled Kinkel with pepper spray. Kinkel later said that he wanted to trick the officer into shooting him, as he had wanted to kill himself after killing his parents but could not bring himself to do so.

In jail, Kinkel was placed on suicide watch. He attempted to kill himself by starvation, but stopped once his sister, Kristin, began visiting him. He did not resume the attempts when she had to leave the state to finish her undergraduate degree because he "didn't want her to have to fly right back [to Springfield] again."

Kinkel was held in solitary confinement for most of the time he was awaiting trial, both at the juvenile facility where he was held until turning 16, and then at the county jail afterwards, exacerbating his mental condition. His delusions continued; he looked forward to receiving an MRI since he believed it would reveal he had been telling the truth about the chip in his brain. When news of the Columbine High School massacre nearly a year later reached him, he sobbed uncontrollably all night out of the guilt he felt for having possibly inspired them to kill 13 fellow students and then themselves, and continuously punched himself in the head in an effort to silence the voices telling him to kill himself. He was taken off his medication for weeks at a time by his lawyers, so his mental health evaluations would accurately reflect his mental state at the time of the crime. (Note: Years later, Kinkel characterized his lawyers' strategy as "the best thing we can do is make him as psychotic as possible".)

=== Guilty plea and sentencing ===
Four years earlier, in response to rising juvenile violent crime, Oregon voters had passed Measure 11, an initiative mandating stiffer sentences for murder, raised to 25 years minimum, and many other offenses. It also required that any offender over the age of 15 be tried as an adult, and eliminated most of a judge's discretion in imposing sentence.

Before trial, Kinkel moved to have the four counts of aggravated murder against him dismissed, arguing that since they would likely have led to a sentence of life without parole if he was convicted, imposing that sentence on a defendant who was a minor at the time of the offense was cruel and unusual punishment, forbidden under the Eighth Amendment of the U.S. Constitution. The motion was denied. In September 1999, with trial imminent, Kinkel suffered a severe panic attack in his cell. Three days before jury selection was set to begin, Kinkel pleaded guilty to lesser charges of murder and attempted murder, forgoing the possibility of being acquitted by reason of insanity. (Note: Kinkel's lawyers may also have recognized the difficulty of successfully mounting an insanity defense due to public antipathy to it that would likely have made jurors extremely resistant to properly considering it.) He had not yet accepted his diagnosis and was afraid of being stigmatized as a "retard", as he would say later, and being sent to a mental institution, which he considered worse than prison. He also feared the stress of a trial would aggravate his condition.

At his sentencing, the defense presented experts to show that Kinkel was mentally ill. Hicks said that he was in satisfactory mental health. He had seen Kinkel for nine sessions and treated him for major depression. William and Faith had terminated the therapy because Kinkel was responding well to treatment and ceased to show symptoms of depression. William Sack, the psychiatrist then treating Kinkel, recalled that when he had given him his interview notes to review, Kinkel had insisted on changes unfavorable to him, saying that he had shoplifted and gotten drunk more than he had previously admitted. "I think he was trying to be almost too scrupulously honest in giving me this information", Sack testified. With proper care and medication, Kinkel might be able to be released in 25–30 years. "I would be happy to have him as my next-door neighbor if those conditions were met."

Survivors and the families of the students took the stand. Many of the former talked of getting through surgeries and other treatments, uncertain they would survive, only to feel guilty when they did. They suffered continuing mental and physical effects; many said their lives had not yet returned to normal and might never. "No one can hug you and tell you everything will be OK, because it won't", said Alldredge, struck in the hand and chest by Kinkel's bullets and almost left for dead. "It won't ever be OK again until every memory, every fear and every consequence becomes nonexistent." Michael Crowley's father talked about how his son, though uninjured, was still so traumatized by watching Nicklauson die across the table from him and then expecting to die when Kinkel put his gun to his forehead that he could not attend the sentencing personally and had had to drop out of school. "He is very jumpy. He is very excitable. He can't stay still. Everything scares him. He's not the person he was a year before."

The survivors and parents doubted whether Kinkel's mental illness was real, and even if it was, the likelihood that he would take medicine prescribed. They called for a life sentence. "Kip has taken Mikael's life permanently. He has taken a lot of joy from our family permanently", said Michael Nicklauson. "And I feel he should be in jail permanently."

Kristin Kinkel, who had been at college out of state when the killings occurred, told the court that she wished she had recognized before the early signs of mental illness in her brother. He needed "different help than any of us knew how to give", she said. Kristin pleaded for Kip to be given the support he needed so that later advances could better treat him. "But most of all right now, he needs hope."

"I have come to the realization that it really doesn't matter what I say", Kinkel said when it was his turn to address the court. "Because there is nothing I can do to take away any of the pain and destruction I have caused." He continued:

I absolutely loved my parents and had no reason to kill them. I had no reason to dislike, kill or try to kill anyone at Thurston. I am truly sorry that this has happened. I have gone back in my mind hundreds of times and changed one detail, one small event so this never would have happened. I wish I could. I take full responsibility for my actions. These events have pulled me down into a state of deterioration and self-loathing that I didn’t know existed. I am very sorry for everything I have done, and for what I have become.

Kinkel's lawyers argued for a lighter sentence on the ground that Kinkel was a minor. "To say that a 15-year-old offender should spend 200 years in prison is draconian", one of them told the court. "Although it seems to be authorized by our statutes, it's unconstitutionally cruel and unusual as applied in this case." The Lane County assistant district attorney prosecuting the case in turn called Kinkel manipulative and compared him to several notorious serial killers, saying he should be sent to prison for the rest of his life. He cast doubt on whether Kinkel was truly mentally ill, noting he had not mounted an insanity defense and that there was no corroboration that he had heard voices.

He was sentenced to more than 111 years in prison without the possibility of parole, making him the first juvenile in Oregon history to be sentenced to what was effectively life.

== Appeals ==
In state court, Kinkel has appealed his sentence twice. Relying on U.S. Supreme Court decisions made over the time since the shooting, he has argued that his 111-year cumulative sentence is unconstitutionally long and harsh for crimes committed as a mentally ill juvenile. The latter of those cases went to the Oregon Supreme Court. He also challenged his conviction and sought a new trial on grounds of ineffective assistance of counsel. After those appeals in state court failed, Kinkel raised both those issues in a federal habeas action.

=== 2002 direct appeal of sentence ===
In 2002 the Oregon Court of Appeals upheld his 111-year sentence. Kinkel had argued that it violated two provisions of the Oregon Constitution. One forbids cruel and unusual punishment and the other, passed a few years earlier as Measure 26, declares the principles of criminal law to be "protection of society, personal responsibility, accountability for one's actions and reformation." The trial court, he said, had placed too much emphasis on the first of those principles by making the sentences for the counts of attempted murder partially consecutive and thus the entire sentence overlong and harsh. Kinkel said that since he accepted responsibility for what he had done and might be rehabilitated later, enough of those conditions had been satisfied as to mandate a shorter sentence.

The state had argued that that provision only gave Kinkel the right to facially challenge the law under which he was sentenced, not an individual sentence under that law. Judge Rick Haselton, writing for a unanimous three-judge panel, agreed that there had been questions as to whether earlier constitutional language allowed an as-applied challenge to the sentence such as Kinkel sought, but found it unnecessary to consider in the instant case as even if it had it would not have reached Kinkel's sentence. "There is no simple mathematical formula for sentencing to be derived from the provisions of Article I, section 15", Haselton ruled. The possibility, raised by Kinkel's medical expert, that his schizophrenia might be curable at some point in the future did not require a trial court to consider that possibility when passing sentence. The court also rejected what it saw as an implicit argument of Kinkel's, that the language expanded through Measure 26 lessened the importance of protecting society, as literature distributed to voters at that time had stated otherwise. "[O]f most obvious significance here," Haselton wrote, "where the underlying crimes are extremely violent and involve multiple victims in a public setting, it may well be appropriate to accord the 'protection of society' consideration greater weight."

=== 2007 appeal of conviction ===
Kinkel then sought post-conviction relief in the form of a new trial. His case revolved primarily around his lawyers' instruction to discontinue his anti-psychotic medication for the weeks leading up to his guilty plea, so that his psychiatric evaluation would reflect his mental state at the time of the shooting. As a result, at the time of the settlement conference (which he did not attend), he was still experiencing some auditory hallucinations and other symptoms. Kinkel argued ineffective assistance of counsel: his attorneys should have had his competence evaluated before the conference, and that his aunt, appointed guardian ad litem, should have been present at the conference, where she might not have agreed to the plea agreement. Because of these lapses, Kinkel alleged he had not made his plea intelligently or voluntarily and thus his state and federal constitutional rights to due process were violated.

After a two-day trial affirmed the conviction, Kinkel appealed. The state's Court of Appeals sustained the trial court in 2011. Writing for a unanimous court, Judge Jack Landau dismissed most of Kinkel's arguments, noting that neither his trial lawyers nor his physicians had seen anything to indicate a possible competence issue as he communicated with them normally and understood everything being discussed. The trial judge similarly noted Kinkel's attentiveness to the plea agreement, which required he initial every paragraph. Nor was the ad litem's role an issue, as she had been appointed strictly to help the defense team get access to Kinkel's school and medical records in the absence of his parents.

=== 2018 appeal of sentence ===
Kinkel v. Persson
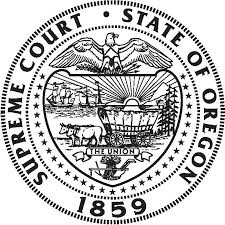
- Seal of the Oregon Supreme Court
- Court: Oregon Supreme Court
- Full case name: Kipland Philip Kinkel, Petitioner on Review v. Rob Persson, Superintendent, Oregon State Correctional Institution, Respondent on Review.
- Decided: May 10, 2018
- Citation: 417 P.3d 401, 363 Ore. 1

Case history
- Appealed from: Oregon Court of Appeals

Court membership
- Judges sitting: Thomas A. Balmer (chief), Rives Kistler, Martha Lee Walters, Lynn Nakamoto, Meagan Flynn, Jack Landau (pro tempore) and James C. Egan (pro tempore)

Case opinions
- U.S. Supreme Court decision in Miller v. Alabama holding mandatory life without parole sentences for murders committed by juveniles to be cruel and unusual punishment does not reach discretionary 111-year aggregate sentence for multiple homicide and non-homicide offenses; sentence complied with Miller even before that decision by considering effect of defendant's youth and finding defendant's mental illness justified lengthy sentence. Court of Appeals affirmed
- Decision by: Kistler
- Dissent: Egan

Keywords
- sentencing; juveniles

In 2012 the U.S. Supreme Court ruled in Miller v. Alabama that life-without-parole sentences for juveniles convicted of murder violate the Eighth Amendment. Since the Court majority's logic in the case, that juvenile offenders require special consideration in sentencing due to their immaturity and capacity for growth which was not allowed for by the mandatory life sentence, was very similar to what Kinkel had argued in his 2002 appeal, he filed a new challenge to his sentence in 2013.

Oregon law on res judicata generally bars petitioners from raising new appeals on the same grounds as those that failed in a previous appeal. Kinkel argued that he was allowed to relitigate what was essentially the same case he had lost a decade earlier since Miller as a precedent had not existed at that time, significantly changing Eighth Amendment law, which would be an exception to the statute. The state prevailed both after a six-day trial and on appeal. The Oregon Supreme Court granted Kinkel's request to hear the case.

Writing for a six-justice majority, Rives Kistler upheld the lower courts. He did not reach the procedural question as he found that Kinkel's Eighth Amendment claim failed on the merits. Kistler distinguished the case from Miller in two ways: that case had involved a youth convicted of a single killing, and the life-without-parole sentence had been solely for that crime. Kinkel's 111-year aggregate sentence, by contrast, resulted from a combination of murders and attempted murders for which no single offense carried such a heavy sentence. Two years before Miller, in Graham v. Florida, when the Court held life without parole for juvenile offenders for non-homicide offenses to also constitute cruel and unusual punishment, Kistler noted, it had distinguished situations involving a combination of homicide and non-homicide offenses from those involving only one type. "Given the nature and the number of the crimes that petitioner committed, we are hard pressed to say that his aggregate sentence is constitutionally disproportionate even taking his youth into account", Kistler wrote. But even without taking those factors into account, he added, the nature of Kinkel's crimes was consistent with the "irreparable corruption" the Court had identified in Graham and Roper v. Simmons, the 2005 decision that held death sentences for juvenile offenders unconstitutional, as a possible justification for sentencing a juvenile so harshly.

Dissenting justice James C. Egan, chief judge of the state Court of Appeals, sitting pro tempore on the higher court due to another justice's retirement before the case was heard, castigated his colleagues for conflating Kinkel's mental illness with corruption. "I cannot agree that petitioner's crimes do not reflect the transient immaturity of youth", he wrote. "In my view, petitioner's youth is inextricable from his crimes". The issues caused by Kinkel's mental condition were exacerbated by his youth. Egan noted that an adult might have been more forthcoming about the auditory hallucinations than Kinkel had been, knowing that they were not a normal part of growing up. "There is no evidence admitted for the truth of the matter asserted that petitioner's crimes are the result of an irretrievable depravity", which could not simply be assumed from the number and gravity of the offenses involved.

Kinkel's petition for certiorari to the U.S. Supreme Court asking it to hear the case was denied at the beginning of 2019.

=== 2021 federal habeas petition ===
In the late 2000s, after the failure of his challenge to his conviction, Kinkel had filed a habeas action in federal court for the District of Oregon. After the U.S. Supreme Court's decisions in Graham and Miller opened up a new legal ground to appeal his sentence, he was granted a stay of the federal action while he pursued a new appeal on those grounds. Following the state Supreme Court's decision affirming the sentence, he resumed his federal case. Kinkel reargued his original claims of cruel and unusual punishment and ineffective assistance of counsel and additionally said the state courts had made procedural errors in reaching their decisions. A third argument, that the Oregon Supreme Court's discussion of Kinkel's Miller and Graham claims had not been part of the question originally framed to the parties and thus denying his appeal on those grounds was a denial of due process, was moot in a habeas proceeding since that had not and could not have been the basis of his imprisonment.

At the beginning of 2022, Judge Ann Aiken held for the state, since for several of arguments Kinkel offered no evidence. She wrote a longer response to his argument that deference to the Court of Appeals under the Antiterrorism and Effective Death Penalty Act of 1996 (AEDPA) was not required since the court had chosen to apply the legal standard for competency rather than the standards used to ensure a knowing and voluntary guilty plea. But since his attorneys had testified that he showed no signs of incompetence, "the issues of competence and voluntariness collapsed". Likewise, the finding of competence was not an unreasonable reading of the facts that would also rule out AEDPA deference. "Without question, it is troubling that Kinkel had resumed his antipsychotic medication only two days before the settlement conference and was experiencing auditory hallucinations at the time of his plea", Aiken allowed, but since the question before the courts had been his competence, and nothing in the record cast doubt on that, the AEDPA deference applied.

Aiken also rejected Kinkel's argument that the Oregon Supreme Court erred in holding his sentence complied with Miller's requirements for imposing long sentences on juvenile offenders when Miller had not even been litigated at the time of his trial. "The fact that Kinkel was sentenced before Miller was decided does not necessarily mean that his sentencing hearing did not comply with its requirements", she wrote. "[T]he record here shows that the sentencing court was presented with argument and evidence regarding Kinkel's youth and its 'attendant characteristics,' and the sentencing court had discretion to consider that evidence and impose a sentence lesser than the equivalent of life without parole." Aiken pointed to Jones v. Mississippi, a 2021 case in which the U.S. Supreme Court had refined its holding in Miller to clarify that sentencing courts do not explicitly need to consider whether a juvenile offender is incorrigible enough to imprison for life when fixing a sentence. She further rejected his argument that Graham forbade similarly harsh sentences for juveniles convicted of non-homicide offenses, finding that not yet settled law. (Note: Aiken did note the Ninth Circuit's Moore v. Biter, from 2013, holding that long aggregate sentences for juveniles are legally indistinguishable from life sentences, and the Tenth Circuit's Rainer v. Hansen decision in 2020, holding that Graham applies to such long aggregate sentences. But she distinguished those cases from Kinkel's since the petitioners in both cases had been sentenced only for non-homicide crimes, unlike him.)

The state had argued that Kinkel's last ground for habeas relief, that its Supreme Court's holding that his sentence was based on his mental illness made exempting it from Miller unconstitutional, was procedurally barred as he had not yet raised it in state court. But Aiken found that analysis unnecessary since to her that argument failed on the merits.

[T]he Oregon Supreme Court did not find Kinkel's youth irrelevant or Miller inapplicable because he was mentally ill at the time of his offenses. Rather, the Oregon Supreme Court found that the nature of Kinkel's mental illness distinguished his case from Miller and, notwithstanding his youth, other factors—including the severity of the crimes, the number of victims, the degree of harm, and Kinkel's potential future dangerousness—left him "within the narrow class of juveniles" who may be sentenced to life without the possibility of parole.

Kinkel filed a petition asking Aiken to reconsider, on the grounds that Jones could not be relevant in evaluating the Oregon Supreme Court's decision since it was handed down three years later. Six months later she reaffirmed her decision, noting that the language of Jones made very clear that the U.S. Supreme Court majority was clarifying Miller and Graham, not creating a new rule of law which would have exempted the Oregon Supreme Court's decision from the AEDPA strictures. Kinkel's briefs had, she added, acknowledged this effect of Jones. Even absent that, she reiterated that Miller did not reach his sentencing since it applied only to mandatory life sentences, not discretionary ones as had been the case with Kinkel. As of 2023, Kinkel had appealed to the Ninth Circuit Court of Appeals, which has appellate jurisdiction over the District of Oregon.

=== Administrative and legislative action ===
==== Measure 94 ====
In Oregon, Kip is the boogeyman that people bring up any time there’s some type of movement on a juvenile bill that might let people who have long sentences get out earlier. To most people, he’s the school shooter from Thurston. They don’t know Kip Kinkel, they just know a name.

— Seth Koch, a fellow Oregon prisoner serving a long sentence for a crime committed as a juvenile,

Kinkel's crimes were cited in defense of Measure 11's stiff juvenile sentencing provisions. Two years later, Measure 94, which would have repealed Measure 11, was put before voters. It failed overwhelmingly, with more than two-thirds of voters in opposition. The Thurston shootings were cited as part of the reason for that result. The pamphlet distributed in opposition to Measure 11 included testimonials from Alldredge and Michael Nicklauson, both arguing that Kinkel would be eligible for release at 21 if Oregon's pre-1994 juvenile sentencing laws were restored.

==== Senate Bill 1008 ====
Twenty years after the shooting, Floyd Prozanski, a state senator from Eugene, near Springfield, who chaired the Senate's Judiciary Committee and had been part of the Lane County prosecution team in Kinkel's case, filed Senate Bill 1008. It modified some aspects of Measure 11, which he had opposed since its passage, by allowing "second look" resentencing hearings for juveniles convicted as adults after they had served half their sentences, end the automatic treatment of minors 15 and older as adults and prohibit life-without-parole sentences for juveniles.

Kinkel was part of a group of prisoners serving long sentences for crimes committed as juveniles who organized lobbying efforts for SB 1008. They invited lawmakers to come meet with them in the chapel at Oregon State Penitentiary, where they discussed what they had accomplished behind bars as contrasted with what they had done to receive their sentences. Some who came said they had considered leaving when they saw Kinkel, still notorious in the state, among the offenders. Prozanski said he got to know Kinkel more than he had as a prosecutor. "What I learned is that he would just like to be able to pay his debt to society by helping others and not having people held back because of who he is and what he did," the senator said. "It's one of those situations that made me pause and made me think twice as to, 'Is justice being served at this time?'" Sherrie Sprenger, a former Linn County deputy sheriff then serving in the state House, recalled how the day of the shooting she had considered never sending her young son to public school and had regarded Kinkel as a monster, but from meeting him came to see him instead as someone with serious mental health issues that were being treated.

SB 1008 drew support from both state Department of Corrections and its Youth Authority, which manages the juvenile corrections system. Ellen Rosenblum, the state's Attorney General, also backed it. But it required a two-thirds majority of the legislature for an amendment to Measure 11 to pass, and opponents of the bill argued that even though it did not apply retroactively (unless an offender earned a resentencing hearing on appeal) it would eventually lead to the possibility of Kinkel's release. "The scars are not healed in my community, from those events, and the trauma is still very real" Lane County's district attorney, Patty Perlow, testified to the House. In a video released just before the vote, Ben Walker's brother spoke about the shooting: "It doesn't matter if he was 15. Kip Kinkel terrorized our community. The victims don't get second chances. Why should the offenders?" Kinkel, watching the hearings in the prison law library, recalled this as "an incredibly hectic, nerve-wracking and guilt-invoking time because it was pretty clear that they were going to use me as the reason that this shouldn't impact kids who are already in the system and who are already trapped."

After the Senate approval, the House passed the bill in May 2019 with just one vote over the two-thirds threshold. Sprenger ultimately voted no. "I think sometimes we get into the paradigm of understanding the offender better, which is smart and good. But nothing we understand about the offender makes the loss less of a loss, or a more justified loss. It just doesn't", she told the Huffington Post later. "I'm pretty certain that Kip feels like he's the poster child for why juveniles that commit murder receive these extraordinarily long sentences or life sentences. And the reality is, it's hard—I'm not saying it's fair—it's hard for the general public to remove Kip Kinkel from their thinking when you're talking about releasing murderers from prison." She said specifically she opposed the bill because she felt victims had been left out of the process, though she declined to give specifics when asked.

Kinkel and the other prisoners he had organized and advocated with were happy for the younger prisoners the bill would benefit. A month, however, when the bill's opponents pointed out that older juvenile offenders could still avail themselves of SB 1008's provisions were they to be resentenced, the legislature passed another bill that eliminated that possibility and specifically exempted anyone convicted before 2020 from them. Kinkel felt betrayed, until he heard from offenders currently in the state's juvenile system who were grateful for his efforts.

==== Parole efforts ====
In 2023 Kinkel filed an application with the Oregon Board of Parole and Post-Prison Supervision for a murder-review hearing, seeking to have his sentence reduced through that process, since he had by then served 25 years. The board denied his request, saying that it can only commute a life sentence, and since he had not received one specifically it did not have jurisdiction. Additionally, since Kinkel has served the 25 concurrent years he was sentenced to for all four murder counts, he is now serving only the time he was sentenced for the attempted murders, a charge again outside the board's authority to commute. He has appealed to the Oregon Supreme Court, arguing he is entitled to a hearing at least.

Kinkel continues to seek parole, although it is considered unlikely that he will ever be released. "Even now, more than 23 years later, I and many other survivors are still dealing with the fallout", Betina Lynn, another survivor of the shooting, said in 2018. "We are all serving life sentences right alongside him." Five years later, "There is still a long memory and a lot of victims", former congressman DeFazio told The New Yorker. "I mean, that guy should never see the light of day."

== Prison experience ==
MacLaren Youth Correctional Facility

Kinkel began serving his sentence at MacLaren Youth Correctional Facility in Woodburn. In the prison's intensive program for young offenders convicted of violent crimes, he finally began to receive serious treatment for his mental illness under the guidance of Orin Bolstad, who had testified on Kinkel's behalf at sentencing. In addition to medication, it involved group therapy. Kinkel says many of his delusions started to fade and he recognized them for what they were. He began, with the help of his therapists, to come to terms with his crimes and how, although he could not deny them, they could not prevent him from becoming a better person. His stability was a priority for prison administrators, who wanted to avoid any incidents related to him due to the high-profile nature of his crime.

The program certified Kinkel as ready to return to society, which he knew was not going to happen anytime soon. He felt that the skills he had learned were going to be wasted when he and the other inmates he had worked with were transferred to adult facilities. "It was a deep contradiction", he recalled later.

Kinkel continued his education, earning not only his GED but a college degree. Shortly after that, in 2007, having reached the maximum age for an imprisoned juvenile of 25, he was transferred to the Oregon State Correctional Institution outside Salem, where he currently resides, with Oregon Department of Corrections SID number 12975669. A 2012 court action to have him transferred to the state hospital for the criminally insane, on the same grounds he argued during his appeal in state court that he was not of sound mind at the time of his guilty plea, failed.

Before Kinkel's transfer, Bolstad called Conrad Engweiler, another former patient, like Kinkel serving a long sentence for a crime committed as a juvenile. By then Engweiler was at OSCI, and Bolstad asked that he look out for Kinkel once he arrived there. Both knew that Kinkel, due to the statewide notoriety of the Thurston shooting, would be especially likely to be a target of violence once at OSCI. Prison gangs might assault or extort him, and correctional officers might not care enough to protect him. Engweiler and other former juvenile offenders worked with the gangs to make sure it was known that Kinkel had protectors among the inmate population. "What I ... establish[ed] with all the gangs is that you come at him, you come at him square. And if you put more than one person on him, there's going to be retaliation for that stuff."

Engweiler took personal responsibility for Kinkel when he arrived at McLaren, teaching him how to walk the yard, but warning him that eventually someone would try to attack him and he had to stand up for himself. Joe Cheadle, Engweiler's cellmate, came to Kinkel's cell on his first day at OSCI, recalling he was "super scared". The correctional officers had told Kinkel to stay in his own cell for his safety, but Cheadle told him that would be interpreted as showing fear and that he needed to get out. While he was out with Cheadle in the yard that evening, "everybody was looking at him ... They didn't know what the fuck to think. They didn't understand what I was doing". Cheadle feared that publicly aligning himself with Kinkel could make him a target as well.

Two weeks into his time at OSCI, Kinkel was returning from playing basketball with Cheadle. While he was getting a drink from a water fountain, someone punched him in the back of the head. Kinkel struck back, and corrections officers quickly broke the fight up; Kinkel offered no resistance and voluntarily went to the ground with his hands behind his back. He served a month in solitary confinement and has maintained a clean disciplinary record ever since.

Kinkel also had to resume his psychiatric treatment. His doctor at McLaren had raised the dosages of his medications just before he was transferred in order to deal with the stress the move was likely to cause. The OSCI physicians did not want to reduce those dosages, and Kinkel gained 50 pounds (23 kg) and began feeling fatigued and having tremors in his tongue. Engweiler told him they were overmedicating him out of fear he would be violent, and urged him to advocate for himself. It took five years for Kinkel to have his medications properly adjusted again; he was also able to see a therapist he knew from McLaren and successfully advocated for other prisoners at OSCI to be able to see outside mental health professionals.

Engweiler also helped Kinkel take advantage of the prison library and resume his intellectual development. The two read literary classics, works by writers like Ralph Waldo Emerson, Ernest Hemingway, Marcel Proust, and Henry David Thoreau, together. Kinkel's increasing comfort in dealing with his mental illness led them to the work of Samuel Beckett and James Joyce. Kinkel found Joyce's Finnegans Wake very relevant to his own experience:

It's long, it's convoluted, things are intentionally misspelled. That type of writing was helpful for me to be able to organize a lot of the pressure that I was feeling ... For most people, it looks like garbage, it looks crazy. But for me, it was a conduit to be able to organize information and my language in such a way where I was able to then get to the point where I could write with no unnecessary words in a paragraph.

At Cheadle's suggestion, Kinkel began training and working in the prison as an electrician. The two older men have been paroled; Kinkel and other inmates serving long sentences they began as juveniles continue their work with "juvenile lifers" who are transferred into OSCI.

== Long-term impact ==
=== Survivors ===
Students in the cafeteria that morning have, in later years, spoken about the impact the shooting had on them physically and mentally.

Three years after Ryker, by then a Marine Corps reservist, graduated from Thurston, he and Alldredge married. After having two sons, they divorced in 2017. "I don't know if we would have ended up having a serious relationship and getting married without the shooting having happened", she told The Oregonian the following year, on the 20th anniversary. She has said that the experience of raising her own sons made her more sympathetic with Kinkel's parents than she had been after the shooting. When one of the boys began assaulting other students in preschool, she took him to get help as soon as she could. "It terrified me that my son was actually going to be that kid", she recalled. While she feels that mentally she has recovered from the shooting and her injuries, she finds herself tensing up sometimes when she encounters strangers while walking her dog. "You don't realize your body has a memory."

Anthony W. Case was shot four times by Kinkel as he took shelter underneath a table. The injuries were severe enough that he was unable to walk for an extended period afterwards and did not return to school until the next year. At Kinkel's sentencing, he said the pain was still enough that he could not walk far without shoes; he still has a slight limp. Nerve damage in his legs led him to give up hopes of playing baseball in college. Instead, he devoted himself to science, earning a bachelor's degree in physics from the University of Oregon (UO) in nearby Eugene, and a Ph.D. in astronomy from Boston University. He worked at the Harvard-Smithsonian Center for Astrophysics where he has helped develop the Parker Solar Probe, the Lunar Reconnaissance Orbiter and HelioSwarm. Case told The New Yorker that without the injuries, he might not have pursued his scientific studies as seriously: "If I had been pushing more toward baseball, there's no way I could have been studying as much".

Like Case, Lynn still has the physical effects of her injuries, but hers are more serious. The second bullet to strike her hit her in the foot, embedding pieces of her sock and shoe within it. After several surgeries the wound became infected and did not fully heal for five months. The nerve damage left her without feeling in much of that foot, her ankle is weak. She must be careful walking and avoids steep climbs on foot. But her mental recovery was worse, she says. "Very quickly there's a push for us to get back to normal, to get back to taking those classes and doing those extracurricular activities, or working that part-time job." She was not ready, and during her senior year transferred from Thurston to an alternative school.

In college Lynn failed most of classes her freshman year. After that, she said, "[I] spen[t] two or three years working unfulfilling jobs and living at home because I just couldn't deal." She had hoped to move out of state, but could not bring herself to do that either since it would mean dealing with strangers unaware of her past trauma. She eventually completed her degree at UO, taking a job with the university's administration where she is allowed to have her therapy dog at work, and settled in Eugene. Living nearby is still difficult for her since there are regular reminders of the shooting and people still associate her with it. Her infirmity is also a mental issue: "It's less about the physical issue itself, and all about the reminder of why it exists". Lynn deals with some issues through gun control activism, although the many school shootings since Thurston have made her pessimistic about preventing them.

Jolene Leu (née Cosby) also suffered psychological effects from being present at the shooting despite being uninjured. Half the students Kinkel injured in the cafeteria alongside her that morning were friends of hers. She was rarely mentioned in news coverage and did not consider herself a survivor since she had not been shot. "I felt that way for a really long time, until I realized that even though I didn't have any physical scars, I was emotionally scarred." When, five years after the shooting, Leu's doctor told her that her first child's due date was May 21, the anniversary, she became very upset. Her daughter was born two days later, and she has said since then that if the girl had been born on the 21st, it might have lessened some of the stress the day causes her. She observes the anniversary by having coffee with another survivor.

Seeing the national news media up close in the wake of the tragedy soured Leu on the journalistic aspirations she had before the tragedy. She recalled how one reporter she was put in contact with wanted her to call other survivors and then hand him the phone without even asking them if they wanted to be interviewed, which disquieted her. Leu eventually opened a photography business, and dealt with her post-traumatic stress disorder, but cannot handle the sounds of balloons popping.

=== Kinkel ===
Kinkel continues to reflect on, and try to understand, his actions. "How could I have gotten to this point at fifteen that all these things came together—where my humanity collapsed, and I did this horrific thing to people I loved and to people I didn't know?" he asked in 2023.

"There's no way his behavior was a choice", says his sister, who elaborates that she has never felt angry enough to need to forgive him since he was the only family member she had left after he killed their parents. Being his sister has, she says, complicated some of her romantic relationships when partners found out. Case resists the desire to explain him but agrees that better mental health treatment might have averted the shootings. If it came down to his opinion as to whether Kinkel should be released, he allowed, it would not be an easy decision but "it wouldn't be a hard no". Lynn is not without sympathy either, recalling seeing Kinkel bullied and having concerns about his mental health even then. But she has no reservations about his long sentence. "He cannot be trusted among other humans", she said in 2018. "He has proven that he is violent and dangerous." Leu opposes the idea of his release as well, since she does not believe he can rehabilitate as his mental illness is so severe. But, she says, "there needs to be a facility where he can still grow as a human being without being punished."

Kinkel and survivors who have spoken about it do agree on tightening gun laws. Kinkel told The New Yorker that no civilian should be allowed to own weapons like the rifle he used. While Case enjoys hunting and target shooting, he is not a member of the National Rifle Association since he believes it has too much political power. He hopes that "maybe we get rid of some different types of assault weapons, large-capacity magazines, and enforce better background checks." Lynn, too, does not want to ban all firearms, but believes that if they become less accessible there will be more potential for society to treat mental illness and other problems before they result in shootings.

In 2024, a Eugene man posted numerous threatening videos online, including one where he discussed becoming "the next Kip Kinkel". He was arrested and the Federal Bureau of Investigation found weapons in his house. He was sentenced to five years' probation, which he violated shortly afterwards.

== See also ==
- Cleveland Elementary School shooting (San Diego), perpetrated in 1979 by a 16-year-old girl, who has also been found to have had mental issues and remains imprisoned, using a gun her father had bought her.
- List of homicides in Oregon
- List of school shootings in the United States by death toll
- List of school shootings in the United States (before 2000)
