= List of Oregon prisons and jails =

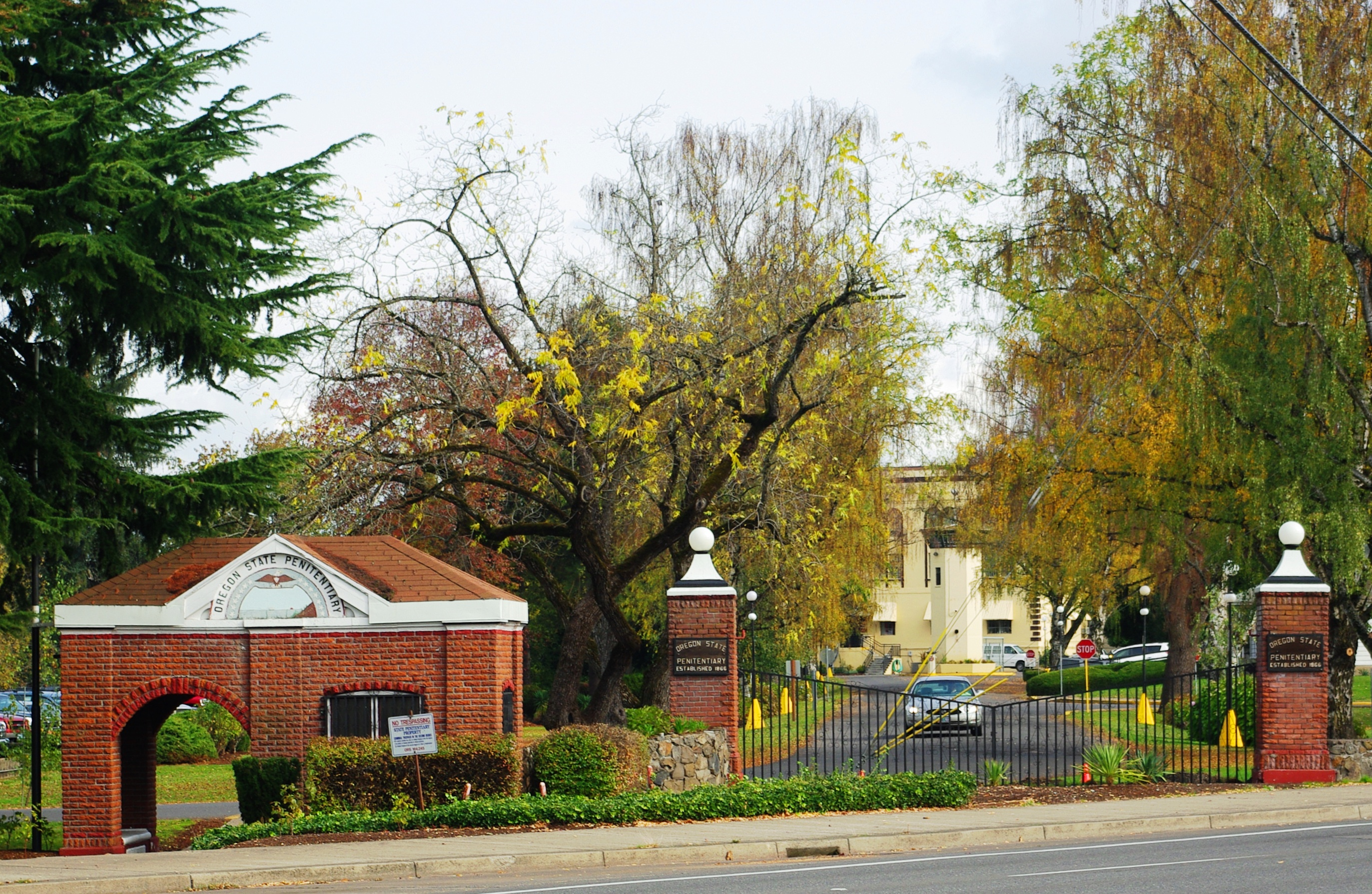
Oregon State Penitentiary

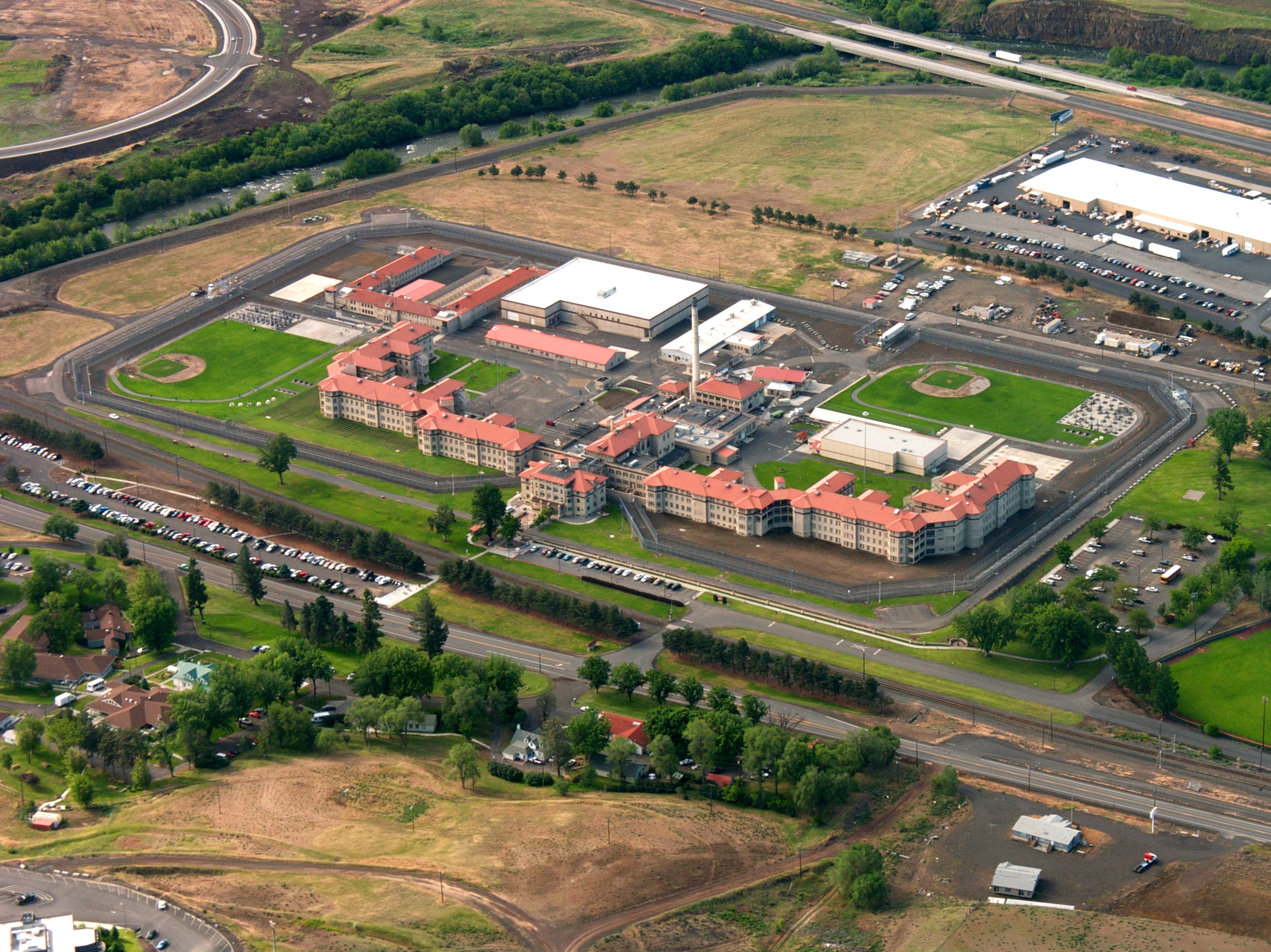
Eastern Oregon Correctional Institution in Pendleton

This is a list of prisons and jails in the U.S. state of Oregon. The incomplete list includes all local, state, federal, and any other detention facilities.

== Federal prisons ==
- Federal Correctional Institution, Sheridan (1,350 medium security, 480 minimum security)

== State prisons ==
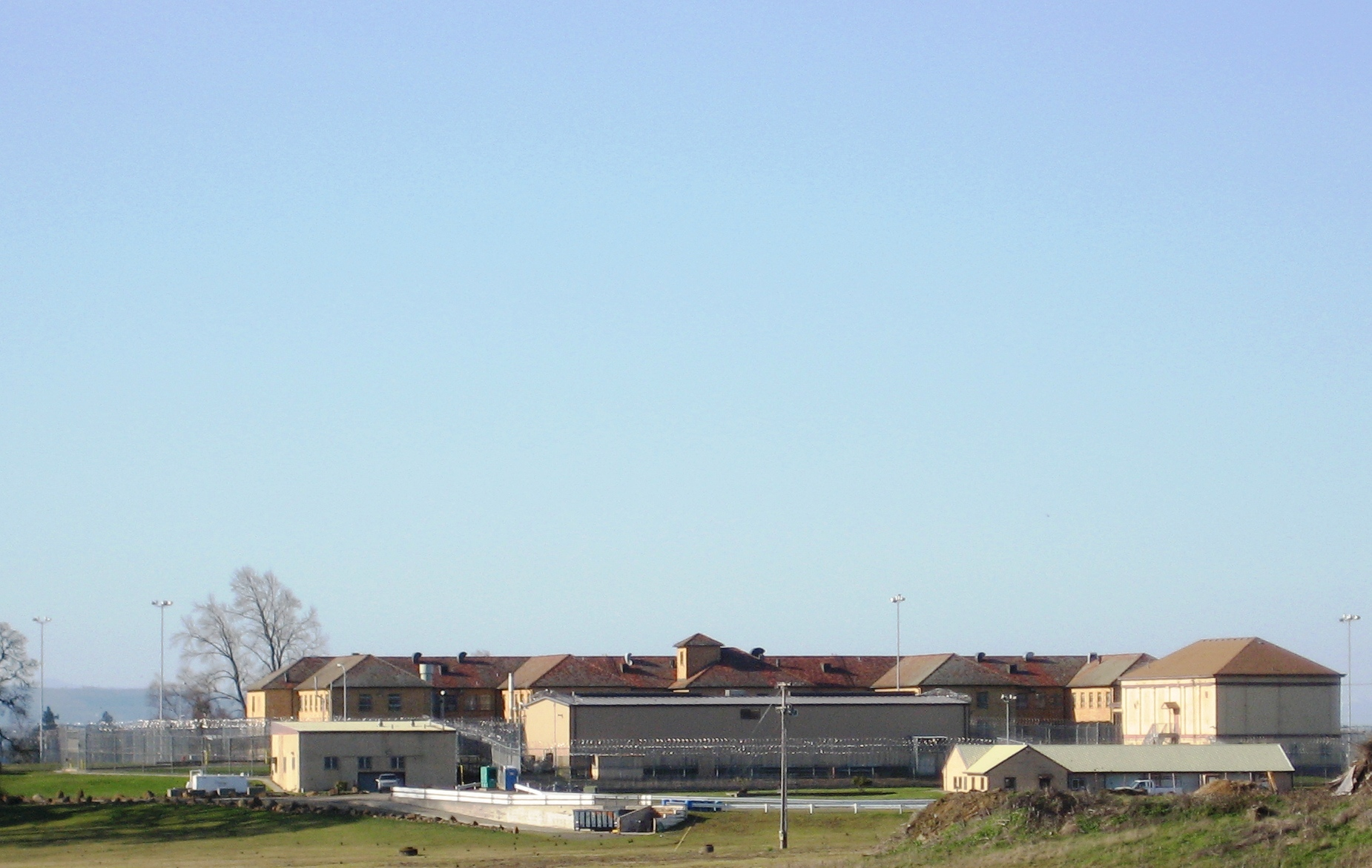
Santiam Correctional Institution

- Coffee Creek Correctional Facility, Wilsonville (1,685 inmate capacity)
- Columbia River Correctional Institution, Portland (595 inmate capacity)
- Deer Ridge Correctional Institution, Madras (1,867 inmate capacity)
- Eastern Oregon Correctional Institution, Pendleton (1,659 inmate capacity)
- Mill Creek Correctional Facility, Salem (290 inmate capacity; closed July 2021)
- Oregon State Correctional Institution, Salem (888 inmate capacity)
- Oregon State Penitentiary, Salem (2,194 inmate capacity)
- Powder River Correctional Facility, Baker City (366 inmate capacity)
- Santiam Correctional Institution, Salem (440 inmate capacity)
- Shutter Creek Correctional Institution, North Bend (260 inmate capacity; closed December 2021)
- South Fork Forest Camp, Tillamook (200 inmate capacity)
- Snake River Correctional Institution, Ontario (3,050 inmate capacity)
- Two Rivers Correctional Institution, Umatilla (1,878 inmate capacity)
- Warner Creek Correctional Facility, Lakeview (496 inmate capacity)

== Youth correctional facilities ==
- Eastern Oregon Youth Correctional Facility, Burns (50 beds)
- MacLaren Youth Correctional Facility, Woodburn (271 beds)
- North Coast Youth Correctional Facility, Warrenton (50 beds)
- Rogue Valley Youth Correctional Facility, Grants Pass (100 beds)
- Tillamook Youth Correctional Facility, Tillamook County (50 beds)
- Oak Creek Youth Correctional Facility, Albany (75 beds)

== See also ==
- Lists of Oregon-related topics
- List of U.S. state prisons
- List of U.S. federal prisons
- Oregon Department of Corrections
- Oregon Revised Statutes
