= Oregon school shooting =

Oregon school shooting may refer to:

- Thurston High School shooting, Springfield, Oregon, May 21, 1998
- Roseburg High School shooting, Roseburg, Oregon, February 23, 2006
- Springwater Trail High School shooting, Gresham, Oregon, April 11, 2007
- Reynolds High School shooting, Troutdale, Oregon, June 10, 2014
- Rosemary Anderson High School shooting, Portland, Oregon, December 12, 2014
- Umpqua Community College shooting, Roseburg, Oregon, October 1, 2015
- Silver Rail Elementary School shooting, Bend, Oregon, October 15, 2026

== See also ==
- List of mass shootings in the United States
