= Mill Creek Correctional Facility =

Former minimum security prison in Salem, Oregon, U.S.

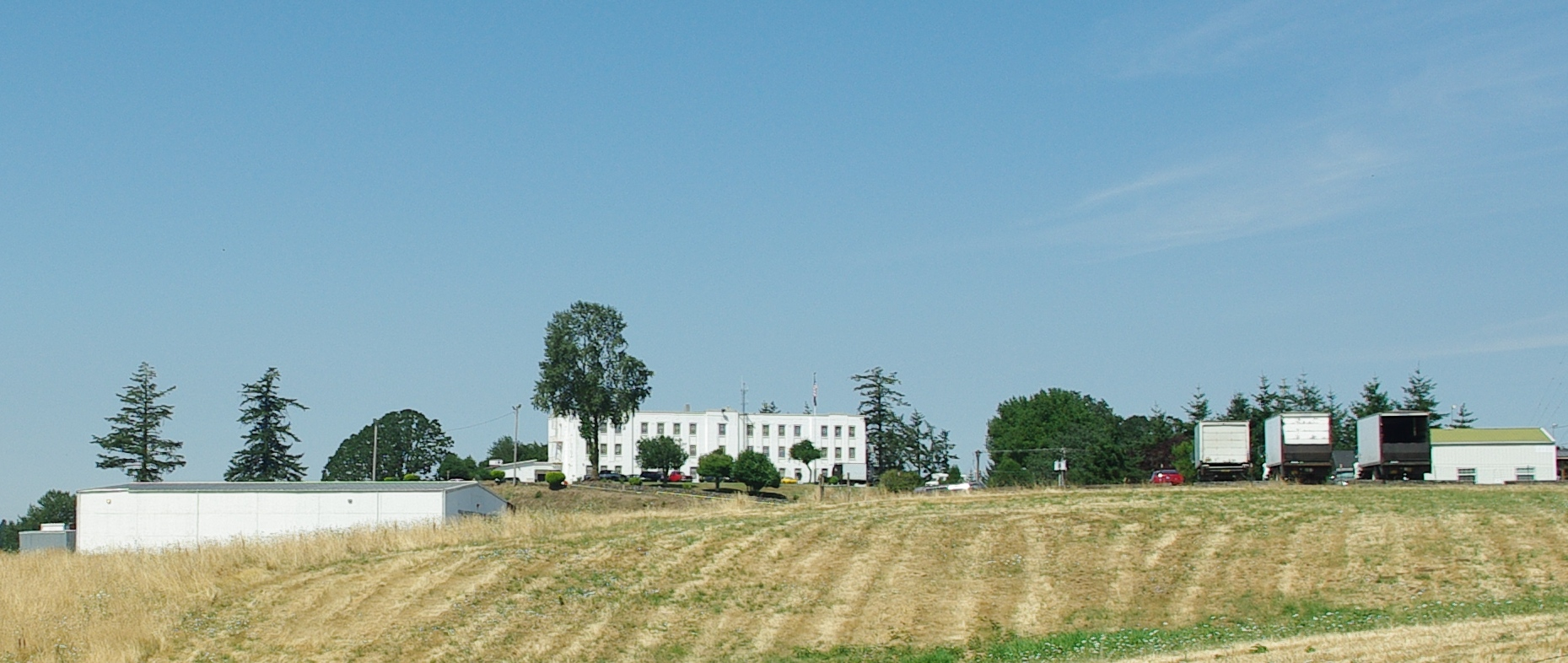

- Location in Oregon
- Location: Salem, Oregon, United States; 44°52′34″N 122°58′26″W
- Security class: Minimum security
- Capacity: 0
- Opened: 1929
- Closed: June 30, 2021
- Managed by: Oregon Department of Corrections

Mill Creek Correctional Facility (MCCF) was a minimum-security prison located five miles southeast of Salem, Oregon on 2,089 acres. The facility was a minimum-security work camp providing prison labor to the Oregon Department of Corrections, other state and local agencies, and private industries throughout the Willamette Valley.

MCCF officially closed on June 30, 2021 as part of Governor Kate Brown's sentencing reform and budget saving efforts.

== History ==
The land on which the Mill Creek Correctional Facility was built was the site of the Oregon State Training School, a reform school for boys, from 1891 to 1929. Overcrowding resulted in most of the boys being transferred to the Woodland School for Boys (now called the MacLaren Youth Correctional Facility) beginning in 1926.

The MCCF opened in 1929 and was originally developed as the Farm Annex of the Oregon State Penitentiary (OSP), both as a rehabilitation tool and to offset food costs at the OSP and at the Oregon State Tuberculosis Hospital. Inmates were shuttled to the site from OSP daily, and used the agricultural equipment and facilities left over from the Training School–as well as new facilities added over time–for cow, hog, and poultry farming and product processing. In 1941, a dormitory with a capacity of over 200 was constructed, and the site effectively became its own full minimum-security prison. In the 1950s and 60s, in response to the cessation of farm operations at other prisons in the state, (Note: These closures were partly the result of changing public opinion, where people began to view farming as an outdated rehabilitation method. For more information, see prisoners' rights and Standard Minimum Rules for the Treatment of Prisoners.) the processing facilities at the Annex were modernized and expanded, and at over 2,000 acres it became one of the largest farms in Marion County. It was renamed Mill Creek Correctional Facility in 1990. Despite the closure of the poultry and hog programs and a series of mismanagement scandals, including a "scathing audit" and a 1992 citation for polluting Mill Creek with wastewater, MCCF continued milk processing operations, partly due to 1994 Oregon Ballot Measure 17, which mandated forty hours per week of work or training for adults held in Oregon state prisons. In 1998 the MCCF closed dairy operations due to growing deficits, and by 2000 all farm activity had ceased.

Escapes were relatively common throughout the entire history of the MCCF, partly because it was low security and lacked fenced borders. In August 2014, an inmate escaped from the facility. One inmate escaped in November 1994, and lived in hiding with a stolen identity until he was reapprehended in July 2024.

After the prison facility closed in 2021, the property was put up for sale and leased to a private farmer.

== See also ==
- Agriculture in Oregon
- Hillcrest Youth Correctional Facility
- List of Oregon prisons and jails
- Mill Creek (Marion County, Oregon)
- Oregon Department of Corrections
