= Anthony W. Case =

American astrophysicist

- Born: 1980 (age 45–46)
- Education: B.S., University of Oregon; Ph.D., Boston University
- Known for: Design of Solar Probe Cup on Parker Solar Probe
- Scientific career
- Fields: Astrophysics
- Institutions: Harvard-Smithsonian Center for Astrophysics, BWX Technologies
- Thesis: Variations in the Galactic Cosmic Ray Flux at the Moon (2010)
- Doctoral advisor: Dr. Harlan Spence
- Website: hea-www.harvard.edu/~acase/

Anthony W. Case (born 1980) is an American astrophysicist who has designed instruments to study the solar wind and cosmic rays on unmanned spacecraft. A native of Oregon, he earned his undergraduate degree in physics from the University of Oregon and a doctorate in astronomy at Boston University. His research has focused on the measurement of atomic particles in space, and the instruments used for that purpose, particularly Faraday cups.

After college, Case worked at the Harvard–Smithsonian Center for Astrophysics for 13 years, where he has helped develop Faraday cups for the Lunar Reconnaissance Orbiter, Parker Solar Probe (PSP), and the planned HelioSwarm, earning several awards from NASA. The Solar Probe Cup he helped build for the Parker Probe's SWEAP instruments was particularly challenging as it had to be able to resist extremely high temperatures since the probe has flown far closer to the Sun than any previous spacecraft, and the cup had to be constantly exposed to the sun in order to do its job. Data it collected has helped resolve the coronal heating problem that has puzzled astrophysicists for almost a century. Case is now employed in the private sector by BWX Technologies of Virginia.

While a junior at Thurston High School in Springfield, Case was injured severely in a 1998 school shooting where two students were killed. One of the four gunshot wounds he suffered cut off the flow of blood to one of his feet temporarily, causing nerve damage. It took him a year to recover and ended his hopes of playing baseball in college. As a result, he pursued science instead.

== Early life ==
Case grew up in the area of Springfield, Oregon. At Thurston he was a trombonist for the school's jazz band. He was also an athlete; by his junior year he pitched for the varsity baseball team, and was team co-captain.

=== 1998 school shooting and aftermath ===
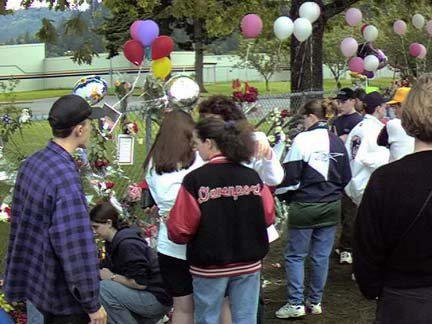
Visitors leaving flowers and balloons as a memorial at Thurston after the shooting

On the morning of May 21, 1998, near the end of the school year, Case was in the school cafeteria passing out campaign buttons and flyers for a friend seeking to be elected student-body president. As he was doing so, a freshman, Kip Kinkel, having killed both his parents at their home the previous night, entered and began shooting at the 300 students present with the two pistols and semi-automatic rifles he was carrying in the trenchcoat he was wearing. Case took cover under a table, but four of the 51 rounds Kinkel fired struck him anyway—three in the back and one in the leg.

Two students were killed and 24 others injured; Case did not realize the extent of his injuries until first responders found all the wounds. He was rushed to Sacred Heart Medical Center in nearby Eugene, where doctors found that in addition to the blood loss he had suffered, the bullet in his leg had become dislodged, causing further nerve and artery damage. They feared he might not survive, and that even if he did his leg might have to be amputated. One surgeon said later that "he was dying before our eyes".

Doctors had to first treat damage to Case's stomach and intestines, where bleeding was heavy due to 14 separate holes. Then they addressed another shot that had pierced both lungs. Only then could they turn to Case's right leg, where the bullet had pierced an artery and vein in the knee and the thigh above it, leaving the portion below without blood flow for a long time. A skin graft was necessary on the leg after the surgery, two days after the shooting. They were unsure whether he could fully recover, although Case believed he would be able to.

The shooting, the latest of several at schools over the preceding 18 months, attracted national media attention due to Kinkel having opened fire in a crowded cafeteria with a semi-automatic rifle, suggesting more serious homicidal intent than the perpetrators of the previous shootings despite the minimal death toll. Life magazine ran a 10-page article about the aftermath illustrated in part by a photograph of Case in his hospital bed. Get-well cards came from across the country.

After a week, Case was discharged. He started regular physical therapy sessions, hoping eventually to resume his extracurricular activities, including baseball. "It's good to be making progress," he told a local newspaper, "[but] it's frustrating, because I don't know for sure if it's going to come back." His therapist said that while Case was clearly regaining the range of motion in his leg, it was not clear how much of his muscles and sensation would come back. He believed that the intense pain Case was beginning to experience in his lower legs might have been due to compartment syndrome, in which swelling that should have occurred after the injuries did not due to the lack of blood. Two of the bullets remained in his body until doctors removed them six months later.

Case threw out the first pitch at a local American Legion game played by his team. His father reported that some pitches he threw to him as a test "still had plenty of zip". But he did not return to school for the rest of the year. By September he was able to, and had resumed playing with the jazz band. He still had no feeling in his lower right leg, could not move the foot, and wore a brace on the leg. But he was eager to resume classes, and felt no hesitation about returning to the cafeteria (now repainted) for the first time since he had been shot there in order to register for classes. By springtime Case, despite still not having any feeling in the right foot, had recovered enough to resume playing baseball, pleasantly surprising his doctors. His coach admitted, however, that despite in one contest striking out nine batters in five innings he was not as good as he had been. Case still hoped to be able to play in college and indicated on the anniversary of the shooting that he was basing his college search around that.

In September 1999, Kinkel abandoned plans to mount an insanity defense and pleaded guilty to four counts of murder and 26 of attempted murder that had been brought against him for the shooting. "I'd kind of like to know exactly why he did it," Case told a newspaper. "But we're never going to find out." The plea included sentences for the murders that could have led to Kinkel being eligible for parole in 25 years, if no further sentence was imposed for the attempted murder charges. At the sentencing hearing on those counts two months later, Case, by then studying at Lane Community College, was among the last of the victims and family members to make a statement. Recounting how it still hurt to walk in bare or stocking feet, he said "Because I will be affected for the rest of my life, I feel that he should be, too." Judge Jack Mattison sentenced Kinkel to another 87 years for the attempted murders, bringing his total sentence to nearly 112 years, effectively a life sentence without parole.

== Academic and research career ==
Case later decided that the long-term effect of his injuries precluded him playing baseball at the college level, and turned to scientific study. After his year at Lane, he studied at Oregon State for two years, then transferred to the University of Oregon, closer to home, where he earned a B.S. degree in physics in 2004. Following that, he began graduate study in astronomy at Boston University (BU), receiving a doctorate in 2010. During that period he worked as a research assistant for Harlan Spence, analyzing data from CRaTER, the Cosmic Ray Telescope for the Effects of Radiation on the Lunar Reconnaissance Orbiter, which informed his dissertation, "Galactic Cosmic Ray Variations at the Moon". Case also worked to quantify the ambient solar wind's effect on coronal mass ejections (CMEs) using global magnetohydrodynamics (MHD) models to quantify the solar wind's effect on CME transit times, This led to his research focus on particle measurement in space. the subject of his first published paper, in 2008, and subsequent research.

After BU, Case began a postdoctoral fellowship at the Harvard–Smithsonian Center for Astrophysics (CfA) in Cambridge under Justin Kasper. He continued to analyze CRaTER data and began preliminary work on the solar cup for what was then known as the Solar Probe Plus, scheduled to launch in 2018. In 2012, he became one of CfA's staff astrophysicists, working on Faraday cups, a device used to capture particles in a vacuum, for space probes. He was test lead on re-certifying the Deep Space Climate Observatory's cup and co-investigator on the Plasma Instrument for Magnetic Sounding (PIMS), a cup included on the Europa Clipper probe scheduled to launch in October 2024 for a 2030 rendezvous with the similarly-named moon of Jupiter.

=== SWEAP ===
Designing and building the PSP posed a significant challenge. An 11.5-centimetre-thick (4.5 in) carbon-carbon heat shield was built so it could withstand temperatures of up to 1,500 °C (2,730 °F) caused by direct sunlight 475 times stronger than on Earth. The onboard electronics also had to deal with the possible corrupting effects of solar flares or coronal mass ejections (CMEs).

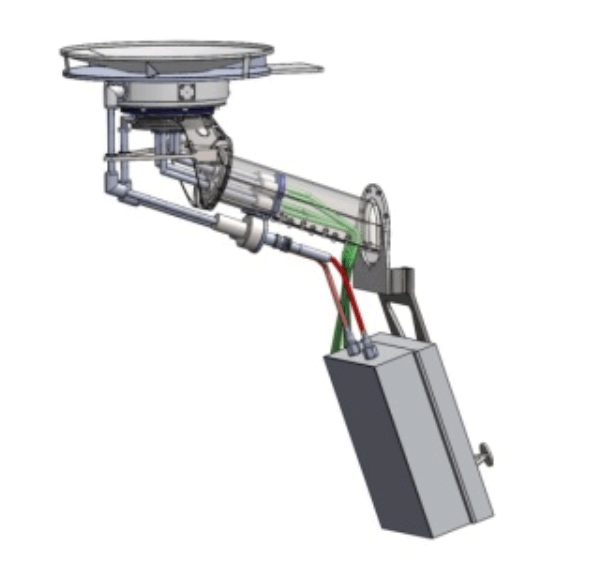
Diagram of the Solar Probe Cup (SPC)

Case discussing the SPC on Destin Sandlin's YouTube channel, Smarter Every Day
- The Parker Solar Probe - Smarter Every Day 198, at 7:25–10:45
- Full interview, on Smarter Every Day 2

Case worked on the team that designed SWEAP (Solar Wind Electrons Alphas and Protons), the instrumentation that collected and measured the particles in the coronal plasma. For them the challenge was even greater. In order to function properly, one of the two parts of SWEAP, the Faraday cup known as the Solar Probe Cup (SPC), had to remain directly exposed to the Sun, outside the heat shield's protection. "We have this unique problem with the SPC of trying to allow in the particles we want to measure," Case told Physics, "while also dealing with all the light and heat that comes with them." It used the same basic design as previous Faraday cups on interplanetary space probes such as Voyager and DSCOVR, but the materials would have to be different given how close the PSP would be going to the Sun.

The team tested materials for the SPC using four modified IMAX movie projectors shining on them in a vacuum chamber to simulate the intense sunlight it would have to deal with. Aluminum, usually preferred in spacecraft instrumentation, was found to easily melt and grow brittle in that heat. They finally found only three metals—niobium, tungsten and molybdenum—that could take the heat. "That's pretty much it for the main constituents of metals that we could use", Case said." Ultimately they chose TZM, an alloy of 99 percent the latter element, combined with titanium and zirconium to strengthen the otherwise brittle molybdenum, for the SPC. The specialized mesh filter that helps trap particles in the cup was made of tungsten. To insulate the niobium wiring which supplied that mesh to 8,000 volts, the team obtained single-crystal sapphire pieces, again the most heat-resistant material they could find, and grew them in the lab. "One of the considerations when we choose materials to make a cup out of is that we want them to be as inert as possible", he explained. "We want materials that don't interact when we place them together in a hot thermal environment".

To deal with the risk of data corruption from heliomagnetic events such as flares and CMEs, the SPC makes three separate copies of its data. In the event of a disparity between the copies, the software defaults to the data in the majority as the uncorrupted version. "If there's a solar flare," Case said, "we can deal with that penetrating radiation, and it doesn't cause any significant effects within the spacecraft."

The SPC is designed to measure solar wind ions with 100–6,000 V of energy, and electrons in the 100–1,500 V range. The PSP is making 24 orbits through 2025, going closer to the Sun each time, eventually becoming the first probe to penetrate the Alfvén surface, the outer boundary of the corona. On its last orbit and closest approach in 2025, it will reach 9 R_{☉}, or less than 6.4 million kilometers (4 million miles) from the Sun, closer than any probe has ever flown before. The SPC has functioned as intended on each approach. Data from the mission has helped point to one long-theorized explanations for the hotter temperature of the corona: Alfvén waves and the magnetic switchbacks they create. Likewise, the slow solar wind appears to come from holes in the corona related to sunspots near the Sun's equator.

=== HelioSwarm ===
Case left CfA for BWX Technologies at the beginning of 2023, where he is a research scientist focusing on instrumentation and is the instrumentation and control (I&C) lead for the nuclear reactor subsystem of the nuclear thermal propulsion engine on the DRACO program. His doctoral advisor, Harlan Spence, is the lead investigator for the planned HelioSwarm probe, scheduled for launch in 2028. It will consist of a group of nine satellites, organized as a hub with eight nodes, that will go into a lunar-resonant Earth orbit, to better measure plasma turbulence from an unprecedented variety of perspectives at once. Understanding that phenomenon better will be very helpful to future space missions, crewed or not, and in protecting satellite communications better against solar events.

== Legacy of shooting ==
Case has kept the bullets that were removed from his body and stores them with his high school baseball trophies and other mementoes of that time in his life. His right ankle has never regained full mobility, leading Case to limp occasionally, but other than that he has no impairments from the shooting and engages in recreational activities like hiking, bicycling and running. He has experienced few long-term psychological effects from the shooting. In May 2022, he told a reporter about how he coped with the shooting:

People are in bad car wrecks that end up significantly worse than I did. Dealing with negative experiences is just part of life, and moving on from them is necessary for future happiness. Of course that is easier said than done sometimes, but consciously having that perspective has helped, I think.

Until the COVID-19 pandemic, he, his family and doctors gathered in Springfield every year on May 21 to celebrate his "second birthday".

The effect of the injuries led Case to his present career, he believes. Had he, as he had originally hoped, been playing baseball in college "[I might not] have studied physics and ended up working on all the cool stuff that I've worked on ... If I had been pushing more toward baseball, there's no way I could have been studying as much."

Being a survivor of a school shooting has not made Case averse to firearms; he hunts and enjoys target shooting. He believes that gun laws should be made more restrictive. "I’m hoping there will be meaningful change in that maybe we get rid of some different types of assault weapons, large-capacity magazines, and enforce better background checks", he said on the 20th anniversary of the shootings.

Kinkel, who was diagnosed with paranoid schizophrenia after the shooting, applied for clemency in 2021 when Oregon's then-governor Kate Brown announced she would consider those requests from adults incarcerated for crimes committed as juveniles. Case followed the story online; Kinkel's request was ultimately rejected. While at the time he had felt Kinkel's motive was irrelevant—"can't we just call him a bad person and a criminal and a murderer, and not worry about whether it was a mental illness?—he now appreciated the role it played: "It's hard to look back and place the full blame on him," he told The New Yorker in 2023. He speculated that had Kinkel's mental illness been properly dealt with prior to the shootings, they might not have happened.

== Personal life ==
Case lives in Sudbury, Massachusetts, with his partner Susanna, a fellow astrophysicist, and their son Walden. He continues to play music, although on the piano, and is active with a community cycling team in West Boston.

== See also ==
- List of astronomers
- List of people from Oregon
- List of University of Oregon alumni
- List of Boston University people
