= Thurston, Springfield, Oregon =

Unincorporated community in the state of Oregon, United States

Coordinates: 44.0531814°N 122.9164697°W

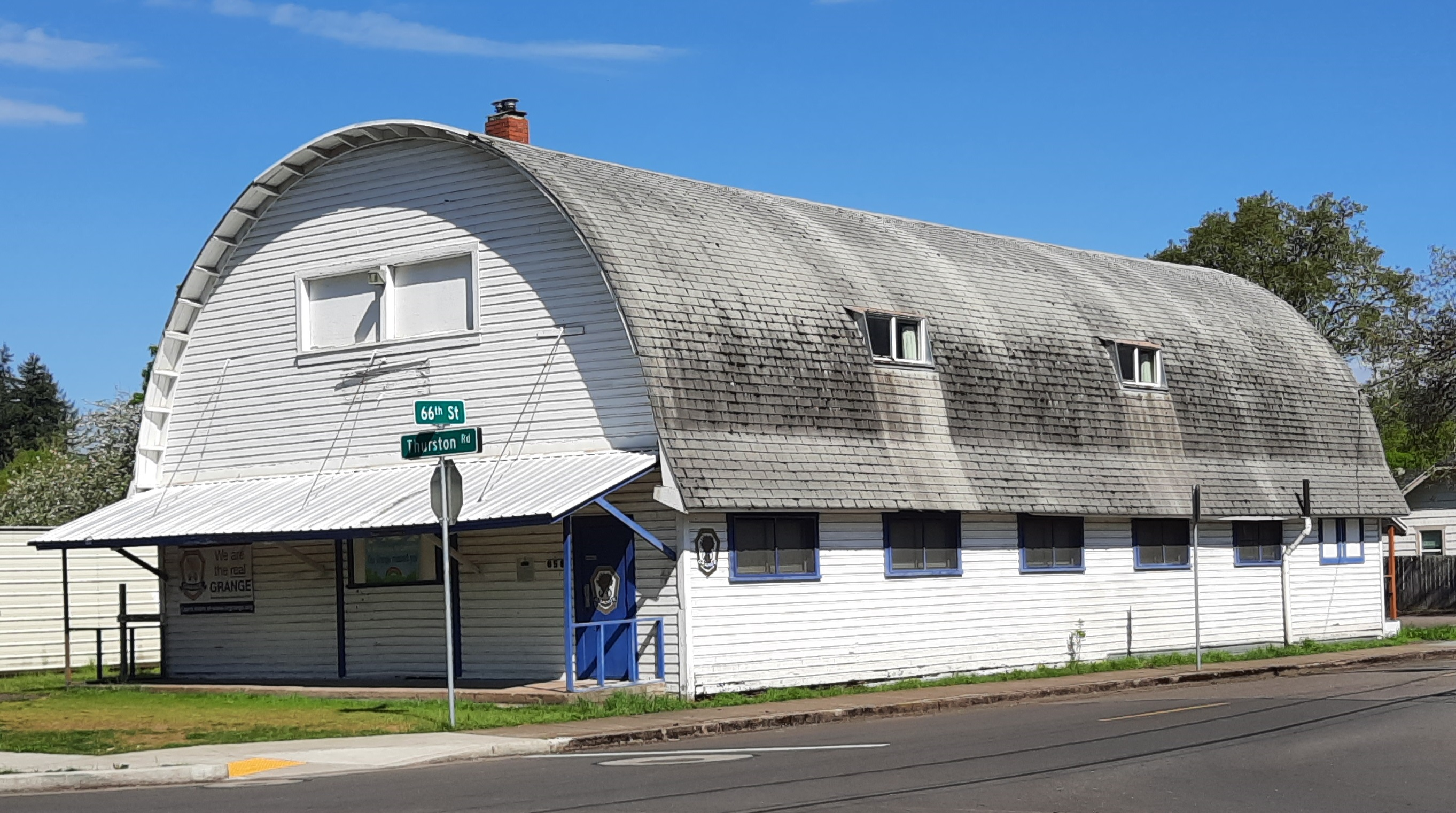
Thurston Grange Hall

Thurston is a neighborhood in the eastern part of Springfield, Oregon, United States on Oregon Route 126. Before being annexed by Springfield, it was formerly an unincorporated community with its own post office. The earliest land claims in the Thurston area by white settlers were in 1851. A small crossroads community, including a general store and a blacksmith shop, formed at the corner of Thurston Road and 66th Street. The settlement was named for pioneer George H. Thurston, son of Samuel Thurston. Thurston post office was established in 1877. The ZIP code for Thurston post office boxes is 97482. The ZIP code for delivered mail is 97478.

Thurston Community Hall was built in 1912. It was the first building in Oregon that was constructed using curved laminated beams. Now known as the Thurston Grange Hall, it is still in use today.

== See also ==
- Thurston High School
