= Robert S. Farrell High School =

Location
- 2450 Strong Road SE; Salem, (Marion County), Oregon 97302; United States; 44.893454°N 123.009539°W

Information
- Type: Public
- School district: Youth Corrections Education Program
- Principal
- Grades
- Enrollment: 0

Robert S. Farrell High School was a public high school in Salem, Oregon, United States. It was part of the Hillcrest Youth Correctional Facility before the facility closed in 2017.
