= Oregon State Correctional Institution =

Prison located in Oregon, United States

- Interactive map of Oregon State Correctional Institution
- Location: Salem, Oregon, United States 44.897°N 122.949°W
- Status: Operational
- Security class: Medium (male)
- Capacity: 880
- Opened: June 1, 1959; 67 years ago
- Managed by: Oregon Department of Corrections
- Warden: Jeremy Wagner
- Website: https://www.oregon.gov/doc/about/Pages/prison-locations.aspx

Oregon State Correctional Institution (OSCI) is a 33-acre (130,000 m^{2}) medium security men's prison located three miles (4.8 km) east of Salem, Oregon, United States. It is operated by the Oregon Department of Corrections. The prison was established by an act of the Oregon State Legislature in 1955 and opened in 1959. OSCI typically houses younger Adults in Custody (AICs), including young adults who began their sentence in a youth detention center. OSCI also houses AICs transitioning out of prison gangs or have given information to the Special Investigations Unit (SIU).

AICs at OSCI are permitted to work in its print shop and mail room, and provide telephone services for the Oregon DMV. AICs may also access education programs, drug and alcohol treatment, and mental health treatment.

As of August 2024, OSCI has a maximum capacity of 888 AICs, with approximately 350 beds designated for transitional release inmates who go through programs intended to prepare them for release to the community. (Note: "Transitional release inmates" are inmates who are scheduled to be released within 6 months.)

Following the promotion of Superintendent Josh Highberger to ODOC Assistant Director of Operations, the current Superintendent (not Warden) of OSCI is Jeremy Wagner.

== History ==
OSCI held its first LGBT Pride event in June 2024.

== Facility and programs ==
Programs available to Adults-in-Custody include:

- Service dog training

== Notable inmates ==
| Inmate Name | Register Number | Status | Details |
|---|---|---|---|
| Kipland Philip Kinkel | 12975669 | Sentenced to 111–112 years, making him eligible for parole in 2110, at which he would be 128-years-old, effectively making it a life sentence with no parole. | Perpetrator of the 1998 Thurston High School shooting in which he murdered 2 people and injured another 26. He had murdered his parents before the shooting. |

== See also ==
- List of Oregon prisons and jails
- Oregon Department of Corrections
