= Rosemary Anderson High School =

School in Portland, Oregon, US

Location
- 717 N Killingsworth Ct; Portland, OR 97217; United States; 45.562060°N 122.674283°W

Information
- Established: 1983
- President/CEO of POIC: Joe McFerrin II
- Website: www.portlandoic.org/high-school

Rosemary Anderson High School (RAHS) is a private alternative high school in Portland, Oregon, United States. It is a program of the Portland Opportunities Industrialization Center (POIC) and is accredited by the Northwest Accreditation Commission. The school was established in 1983. Rosemary Anderson High School East was established in 2012 to serve students in the Centennial and Gresham-Barlow school districts in eastern Multnomah County. The school provides a year-round program that gives students a last chance to earn a high school diploma. The community based programs of the POIC serve youth and young adults through the age of 25.

The school has an annual enrollment of 190 at-risk students who have been expelled from or dropped out of public high school, including many students experiencing homelessness. The program has a 90% graduation rate for students who enroll and attend classes. The East program can enroll up to 200 students. The school is registered with the Oregon Department of Education, which qualifies POIC to contract with school districts and makes it eligible to instruct and administer high school diplomas and instruct for the GED.

== History ==
In 1983, Portland Public Schools requested that POIC develop an academic high school program for students who were failing in the public school system. The program was directed by a group of volunteers, led by teacher Rosemary Anderson and former University of Washington Vice President for Minority Affairs Samuel E. Kelly. According to Kelly, Anderson had been with POIC since 1967 and founded the high school program to help her own grandson. She had heard about Opportunities Industrialization Center alternative high school programs throughout the country and wanted to start a similar program in Oregon. The school was located in the Albina neighborhood, which had traditionally had a predominantly African American population.

The school's first graduation ceremony took place in 1992. In 1997, the school, then known as Portland OIC High School, was renamed Rosemary Anderson High School to honor Rosemary Anderson's commitment to helping at-risk youth. Anderson's grandson, Joe McFerrin II, succeeded Kelly as president of RAHS.

== Shooting ==
On December 12, 2014, a shooting occurred near the school. Four people were injured. All of the victims were students at the school, they consisted of two boys and two girls. One was shot in the chest and required surgery, another was grazed in the foot, and the other two were in serious condition, which they eventually recovered from. Police stated the shooting appeared to be gang-related. On December 13, a 22-year-old man who was on parole at the time was arrested in connection with the shooting and the following day an 18-year-old male was arrested along with one other teen. 16-year-old Marquise Murphy was found to be the shooter, he pled guilty and he was sentenced to 10 years in prison. As part of his plea agreement Murphy is allowed to be released after 8 1/2 years in prison if—on his 25th birthday—it is determined that he has reformed while in youth prison. Lonzo Murphy, Marquise's 22-year-old brother pled no contest and was sentenced to 7 1/6 years in prison and 18-year-old Marquel Dugas, a friend who accompanied the Murphy brothers to the high school, also pled no contest and was sentenced to 8 1/3 years in prison and a fourth man charged in relation to the case, 19-year old, Geno Malique King, was accused of trying to help Marquise Murphy flee the state by driving a car toward Las Vegas and he was also charged with trying to elude police who caught up to him in the Salem area. In March, he pleaded guilty and was sentenced to 1 1/2 years of probation. Dugas is currently incarcerated in the Eastern Oregon Correctional Institution and Lonzo is currently incarcerated in the Two Rivers Correctional Institution.

== Innovative programs ==
In 2011, after the school received a $256,000 grant from the Portland Children's Levy to implement an after-school program, Bibi McGill, the lead guitarist and musical director for Beyoncé's touring band, started a twice-weekly yoga program at RAHS.

RAHS East offers students a for-credit mindfulness and meditation class, which is also offered at Ida B. Wells-Barnett High School. The year-long class, part of the Peace in Schools organization, began in September 2014.

== See also ==
- Leon Sullivan
