= Thurston High School =

Public high school in Oregon, United States

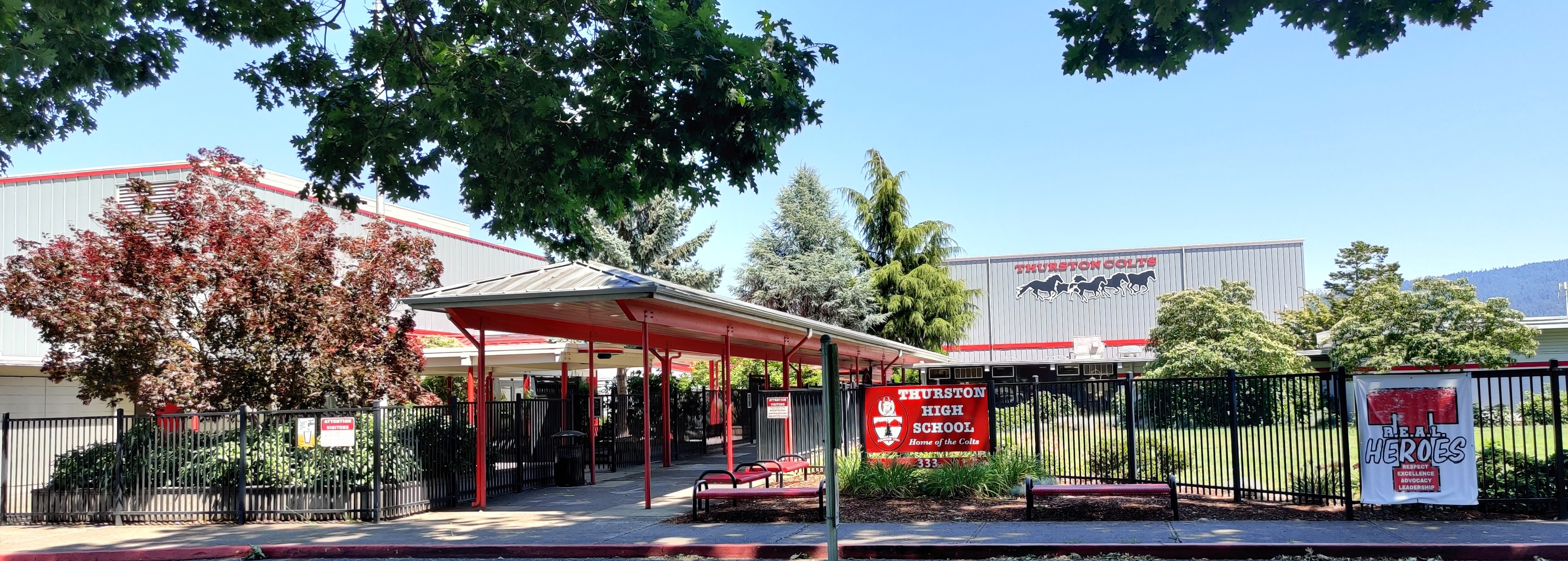
- Entrance to the school, 2021

Location
- 333 North 58th Street; Springfield, (Lane County), Oregon 97478; United States; 44°02′57″N 122°55′30″W

Information
- Type: Public
- Opened: 1960
- School district: Springfield School District
- Grades: 9–12
- Enrollment: 1,215 (2024-2025)
- Colors: Red, black, and white
- Athletics conference: OSAA Midwestern 5A
- Mascot: Colt
- Newspaper: The Pony Express
- Website: www.springfield.k12.or.us/THS

Thurston High School is a public high school located in the Thurston area of Springfield, Oregon, United States.

== Academics ==
In 2025, 90% of the school's seniors received a high school diploma in four years. 29% of students met Oregon proficiency standards in English language arts, 14% met the standards in mathematics, and 35% did so in science.

== Notable alumni ==
- Anthony W. Case, astrophysicist
- Colby Covington, professional mixed martial artist, former UFC interim welterweight champion
- Jodi Ann Paterson, Playboy Playmate of the Year 2000
- Dan Straily (born 1988), starting pitcher in the Philadelphia Phillies organization

== Notable faculty ==
- Matt LaBounty

== Shooting ==
On May 21, 1998, the school was the scene of a shooting. Kipland Kinkel, a student who had been suspended the previous day pending expulsion, opened fire with two guns and killed two students and injured 25 others. He was pinned down while he was reloading and restrained until police arrived and arrested him. Kinkel, who had also murdered his parents the previous night, was sentenced to 111 years in prison.
