= Deer Ridge Correctional Institution =

Prison in Madras, Oregon, U.S.

Coordinates: 44°38′12″N 121°03′10″W

- Interactive map of Deer Ridge Correctional Institution
- Location: 3920 E Ashwood Road Madras, Oregon
- Status: Operational
- Security class: Minimum; medium
- Capacity: 1867 (644 minimum, 1,223 medium)
- Opened: September 2007
- Managed by: Oregon Department of Corrections
- Warden: Chris Randall
- Website: www.oregon.gov/doc/about/Pages/prison-locations.aspx

The Deer Ridge Correctional Institution is a state prison for men located in Madras, Jefferson County, Oregon, owned and operated by the Oregon Department of Corrections. The facility opened in 2007 and holds a maximum of 1867 inmates, 1223 at medium security and 644 at minimum security.
