= Eastern Oregon Correctional Institution =

State prison in Pendleton, Oregon, US

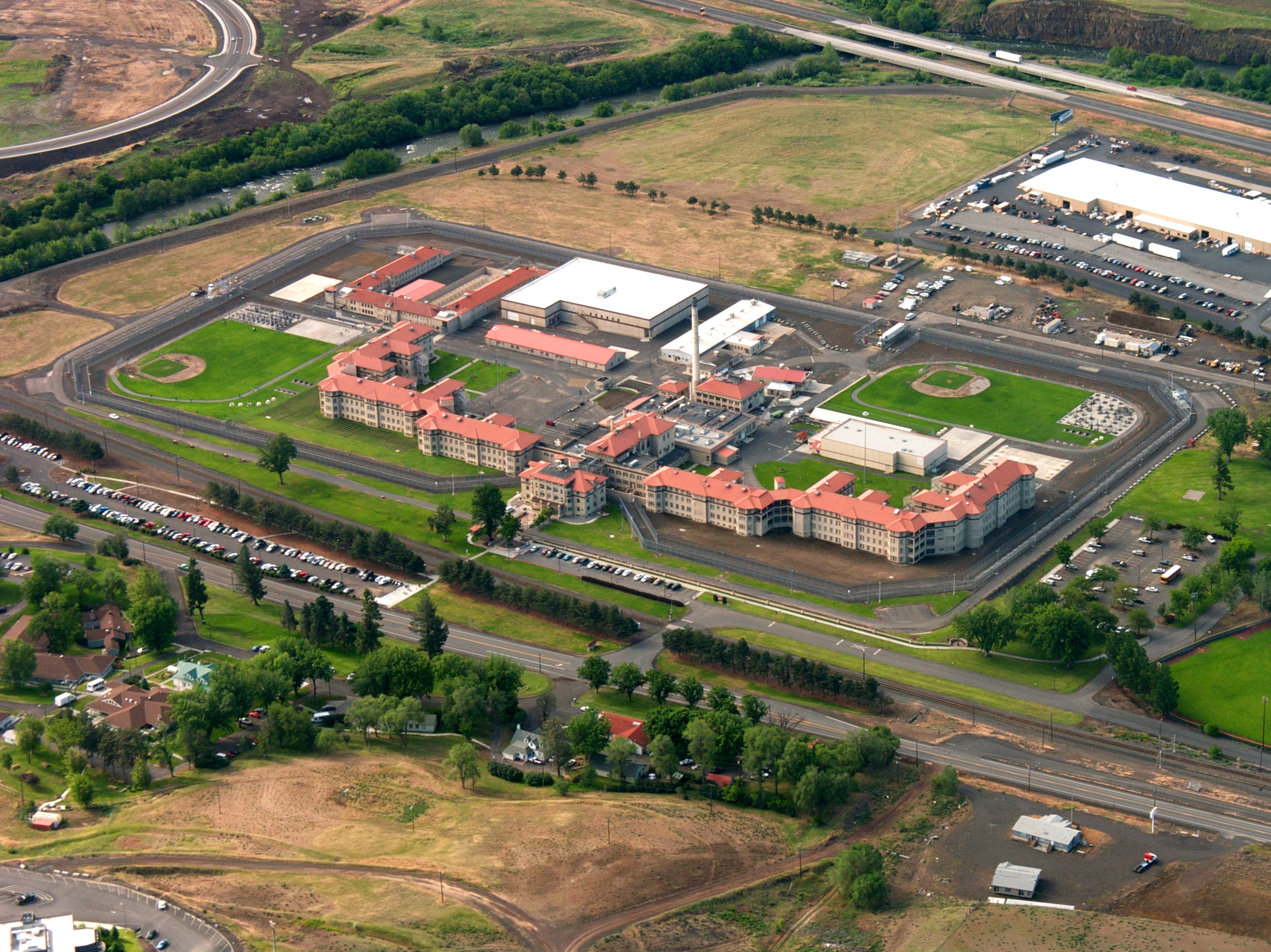
- Interactive map of Eastern Oregon Correctional Institution
- Location: Pendleton, Oregon, United States 45.6715°N 118.8171°W
- Status: Operational
- Security class: Medium (male)
- Capacity: 1,600 inmates
- Opened: 1985
- Managed by: Oregon Department of Corrections
- Warden: David Pedro
- Website: https://www.oregon.gov/doc/about/Pages/prison-locations.aspx

The Eastern Oregon Correctional Institution is one of 14 state prisons in Oregon, United States. The prison is located in Pendleton, Oregon. The facility was originally built in 1912 as the Eastern Oregon State Hospital, a hospital for long-term mental patients, but was converted into a prison in 1983. In addition to providing confinement housing, food service, and medical care, the correctional facility offers education, vocational training, and work opportunities within the prison. Inmates at the Eastern Oregon Correctional Institution produce Prison Blues garments, an internationally marketed clothing line.

== History ==
Most of the facilities that now house the Eastern Oregon Correctional Institution were built in 1912 and 1913. They were originally built for use as Eastern Oregon State Hospital, a former state mental hospital. They were designed by William C. Knighton, the State Architect.

As such, the buildings housed the Eastern Oregon Hospital and Training Center until the Oregon legislature authorized their conversion into a men's medium-security prison in 1983. When the first inmates arrived at the Eastern Oregon Correctional Institution on 24 June 1985, the prison became Oregon's first state correctional facility located outside Marion County.

Today, the Eastern Oregon Correctional Institution is one of 14 state prisons run by the Oregon Department of Corrections. As of 2009, the prison was the fourth largest employer in Pendleton.

== Facilities and correctional programs ==
The Eastern Oregon Correctional Institution is a 1600-bed facility located in Pendleton, Oregon. It has 19 separate general population housing units with 596 dormitory beds and 897 confined cell beds. There is also a 99-bed single-occupancy disciplinary segregation unit and an 8-bed infirmary.

Medical care is provided to all inmates as required. The medical services include sick call, ambulatory care, dental services, health education, and emergency care. There are also programs for control of communicable diseases, sex offender treatment, and treatment for alcoholism and drug abuse. The state prison's Health Services Unit also conducts quality assurance and peer review of all medical services provided to inmates.

The prison provides behavioral health services including HIV education and counseling, mental health case management services, mental health day treatment, and crisis intervention counseling. Anger-management classes are available to inmates as well. The opportunity to participate in religious services is also provided. The faith-based programs help inmates make peace with their past and search for personal meaning in their life. These programs are all voluntary and available to all inmates.

== Education and vocational training ==
Treasure Valley Community College provides educational services at the prison. Between 1986 and 2009, approximately 1,000 inmates received either a General Educational Development certificate or a high school diploma through the institution's basic educational program. In 1999, the prison expanded education opportunities through a program called the New Directions Education Project. The program offers inmates college level courses taught by instructors from Treasure Valley Community College. The cost of tuition, textbooks, and supplies are covered by donations from local churches, civic groups, foundations, and members of the public.

The prison's creative arts program was begun in 2001. It includes wood working and cast iron work. The program provides meaningful work while inmates learn valuable job skills in a realistic work environment. This improves an inmate's chance of getting a job and becoming a productive citizen upon release from prison. The creative arts program is self-financing, and has helped other state agencies develop similar wood working programs.

Eastern Oregon Correctional Institution's commercial laundry (managed by Oregon Corrections Enterprises cleans clothing and other items for its own prison population. OCE also offers job training in two telemarketing call centers, as well as a production factory manufacturing "Prison Blues" clothing. Other inmate work opportunities include the prison food service, clerical jobs, and facility maintenance.

== Prison Blues ==
Commercial Prison Blues brand garments are produced at the Eastern Oregon Correctional Institution. The garment manufacturing operation is one of the largest prison industries in the state. The Prison Blues enterprise manufactures denim blue jeans, yard coats, and work shirts for Oregon prison inmates and commercial sales to the public.

The Prison Blues production facility was established in 1989 by Inside Oregon Enterprises, a division of the Oregon Department of Corrections. The start-up cost for the 37,000-square-foot (3,400 m^{2}) production facility was financed by a Federal grant, but the operation is now self-financing. By 1998, the Prison Blues brand was being sold in 30 states and overseas. In 2001, Prison Blues began marketing its denim jeans and other garments on-line. Today, the Prison Blues brand is a successful commercial product line sold across the United States and internationally.

Inmates who work in the Prison Blues factory are all volunteers. In fact, there is always a long waiting list of inmates who would like to join the Prison Blues workforce. To be eligible, an inmate must have a record of good conduct and successfully interview with the factory personnel office, an experience that helps inmates prepare for job interviews outside prison. Once hired, an inmate must continue to demonstrate good behavior and produce garments that meet the Prison Blues standard of quality. Inmates working in the Prison Blues factory are paid prevailing private sector wages, of which they receive twenty percent. They are also eligible for quality and productivity bonuses. Eighty percent of their salary is returned to the state to help cover the cost of incarceration, pay victim restitution, and provide family support. Inmates also pay both state and Federal taxes on their earnings. The inmate can save the remaining amount or use it to provide additional family support, take college courses, or purchase items at the prison store.

== Visiting ==
At the Eastern Oregon Correctional Institution, visiting is permitted five days a week, Wednesday through Friday and every other Saturday; there are two visiting periods each day. In the morning the visiting hours are from 0830 until 1115, while afternoon visiting hours are from 1300 until 1545. The prison is closed to visitors on Mondays and Tuesdays.

== In popular culture ==
In the 1975 film One Flew Over the Cuckoo's Nest the institution is metonymously referenced several times as Pendleton, and it is implied that the character of R.P McMurphy has been incarcerated there prior to his commitment to the hospital in which the film takes place. Pendleton is explicitly referenced several times in the Ken Kesey novel.
