= HelioSwarm =

Planned Sun-observing satellite

HelioSwarm is a planned NASA mission to study the Sun. It is a Medium-Class Explorers mission of the Explorers Program, planned to be launched in 2029. It will consist of nine satellites ("one hub spacecraft and eight co-orbiting small satellites"), that will measure solar wind turbulence - fluctuations in the magnetic field and motions of the solar wind. The mission PI is Harlan Spence from the University of New Hampshire.
