= Oregon Department of Corrections =

Agency overview
- Employees: 4,404

Jurisdictional structure
- Operations jurisdiction: Oregon, USA
- Map of Oregon Department of Corrections's jurisdiction
- Area: 98,466 square miles (255,030 km^{2})
- Population: 3,930,065 (2013 est.)
- General nature: Civilian police

Operational structure
- Headquarters: Salem, Oregon
- Agency executive: Mike Reese, Director

Facilities
- Prisons: 12

Website
- Oregon DOC Website

The Oregon Department of Corrections is the agency of the U.S. state of Oregon charged with managing a system of 12 state prisons since its creation by the state legislature in 1987. In addition to having custody of offenders sentenced to prison for more than 12 months, the agency provides program evaluation, oversight and funding for the community corrections activities of county governments. It is also responsible for interstate compact administration, jail inspections, and central information and data services regarding felons throughout the state. It has its headquarters in Salem.

== Institutions ==
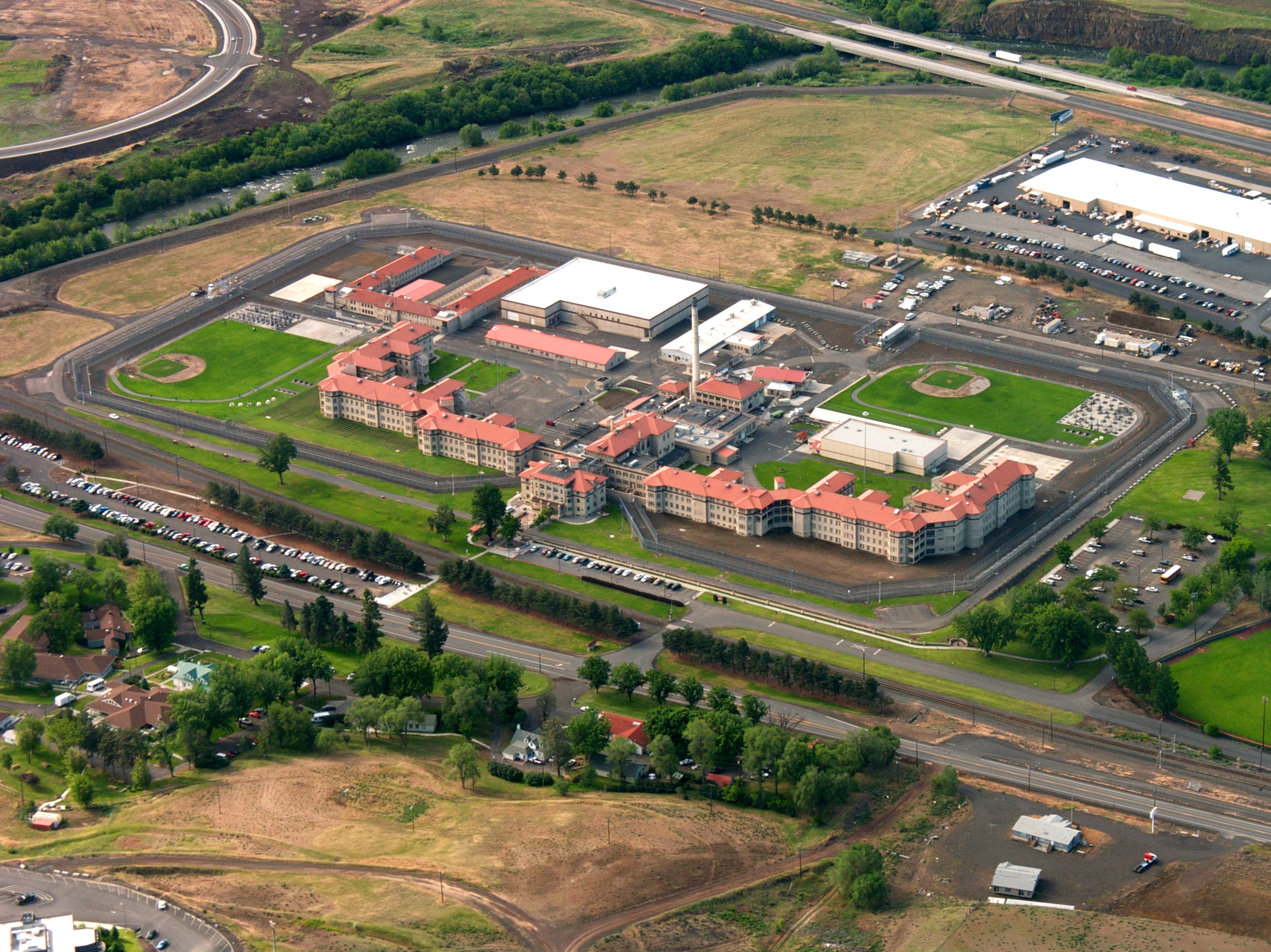
Aerial photograph of the Eastern Oregon Correctional Institution

The Oregon Department of Corrections operates 12 facilities across the state. They also operate the Community Corrections offices in Linn and Douglas counties.

Facility	Location	Security Level	Opened	Capacity
Coffee Creek Correctional Facility	Wilsonville	Minimum-Medium (Women)	2001	1,685
Columbia River Correctional Institution	Portland	Minimum	1990	595
Deer Ridge Correctional Institution	Madras	Minimum-Medium	2007	2,002
Eastern Oregon Correctional Institution	Pendleton	Medium-Maximum	1912	1,600
Oregon State Correctional Institution	Salem	Medium-Maximum	1959	888
Oregon State Penitentiary	Salem	Medium-Maximum	1866	2,242
Powder River Correctional Facility	Baker City	Minimum	1989	286
Santiam Correctional Institution	Salem	Minimum	1946	440
Snake River Correctional Institution	Ontario	Minimum-Maximum	1991	3,000
South Fork Forest Camp	Tillamook	Minimum	1951	204
Two Rivers Correctional Institution	Umatilla	Minimum-Maximum	1997	1,632
Warner Creek Correctional Facility	Lakeview	Minimum	2005	475

== Oregon Department of Corrections agency history ==
In 1851, Oregon established its first state-run institution. Oregon State Penitentiary (OSP) was established in 1851 in Portland, Oregon. However, in 1864 funds were allocated to purchase as its in Salem for OSP and an insane asylum. In 1866 OSP was relocated to Salem and encompassed by a concrete wall. OSP is Oregon's only maximum security prison. The capacity of the penitentiary is 1700 inmates. From 1866 to 2007 the Oregon Department of Corrections opened 13 more correctional institutions. For over a century Oregon sustained with one prison, with the addition of the second prison in 1929 (Mill Creek Correctional Facility) after the state allowed for the entrance of Black people in 1926.

In 1929 Mill Creek Correctional Facility (MCCF) was converted from a state training school to a minimum security prison (previously named Annex Farm). This facility is entirely self funded and uses prison labor to produce food for their facility and other ODOC institutions. Eastern Oregon Correctional Institution (EOCI) was opened in Pendleton in 1985 in the form Eastern Oregon Hospital and Training center and as a minimum security prison places significance on rehabilitation. However, Oregon Department of Corrections was not called the Oregon Department of Corrections until 1987 in which its name changed from "Corrections Division". Oregon Women's Correctional Center opened in 1965, became autonomous in 1972, and was recommissioned in 2002.

Santiam Correctional Institution was opened in 1977 in Salem as minimum security facility. Powder River Correctional Institution was opened in Baker City in 1989. Shutter Creek Correctional Institution was previously an Air National Guard Radar Station in North Bend and was converted to a minimum security labor camp in 1990. Snake River Correctional Facility was opened in 1991. South Fork Forest Camp (SFFC) has used inmate labor to combat forest fires and to assist the State Forestry Department in its reforestation program. Two Rivers Correctional Facility's construction was complete in March of 200; however, ODOC began housing inmates in December 1999. Coffee Creek's minimum security institution was opened in October 2001 and the medium security facility was opened in April 2002. Coffee Creek Correctional Facility (CCCF) comprises Oregon Corrections Intake Center (OCIC) for men and women; in addition, to the states only full service women's prison. Warner Creek Correctional Facility (WCCF) opened in September 2005 and houses 400 inmates. Construction for the institution was delayed in 2001 due to lack of funding and continued in 2003 after funding was allocated. Finally, the states newest prison, Deer Ridge Correctional Institution (DRCI), was established in 2007.

In 2021, Governor Kate Brown announced a plan to close 3 minimum security facilities operated by the department; Mill Creek Correctional Facility in Salem, Shutter Creek Correctional Institution in North Bend, and Warner Creek Correctional Facility in Lakeview. The closures were expected to save the state approximately $44 million. Later that same year, 193 employees of the department were placed on leave for failing to abide by Governor Brown's COVID-19 vaccination requirement for state employees.

== Oregon Prison/Jail Population Demographics ==
Race:

- White people make up 78% of Oregon's state population and 69% of Oregon's prison/jail population.
- Latino people make up 12% of Oregon's state population and 16% of Oregon's prison/jail population.
- Black people make up 2% of Oregon's state population and 10% of Oregon's prison/jail population.
- American Indian and/or Native American people make up 1% of the Oregon state population and 3% of Oregon's prison/jail population.

While Latino people, Black people, and American Indian and/or Native American people are overrepresented in Oregon's incarcerated population, white people are underrepresented.

Sex:

- Women account for 1,211 (approximately 8%) of inmates in the Oregon prison population and make up 50.4% of the Oregon state population.
- Men account for 13,512 (approximately 92%) of inmates in Oregon's prison population and make up 49.6% of the Oregon state population.

Age:

- 17 and under: 0
- 18-24: 1,267
- 25-30: 2,811
- 31-45: 6,253
- 46-60: 3,556
- 61 and older: 1,036
- Total: 14,923

== Oregon death penalty ==
In Oregon's history the death penalty became law four times. On two occasions it was voted out of practice by Oregon citizens and once abolished by Oregon Supreme Court.

Male death row inmates are held at Oregon State Penitentiary. Women on death row are held at Coffee Creek Correctional Facility until shortly before their execution. The execution chamber is at Oregon State Penitentiary. The Oregon Statute States:"The punishment of death shall be inflicted by the intravenous administration of a lethal quantity of an ultra-short-acting barbiturate in combination with a chemical paralytic agent and potassium chloride or other equally effective substances sufficient to cause death." The chemicals used to inflict death are Pentobarbital which induces unconsciousness, Pancuronium Bromide which stops breathing, and Potassium Chloride which stops the heart from beating.

As of January 1, 2019, there are 30 inmates on death row (29 men and 1 woman).

Effective 2020, while there will still be inmates with death sentences, the death row itself will dissolve as an entity.

== Private prisons ==
The state of Oregon does not use private prisons, and as of 2001 outlawed its former practice of exporting state prisoners to other states.

An effort in 1996 had about 12% of Oregon's prisoner population exported to private facilities run by Corrections Corporation of America in Texas and Arizona. The experiment ended after escapes, sexual contact between guards and inmates at Central Arizona Detention Center, and a controversy related to CCA's housing of 240 Oregon sex offenders in a private facility near Houston Intercontinental Airport. Local authorities were only notified of their presence after two had escaped.

== Fallen officers ==
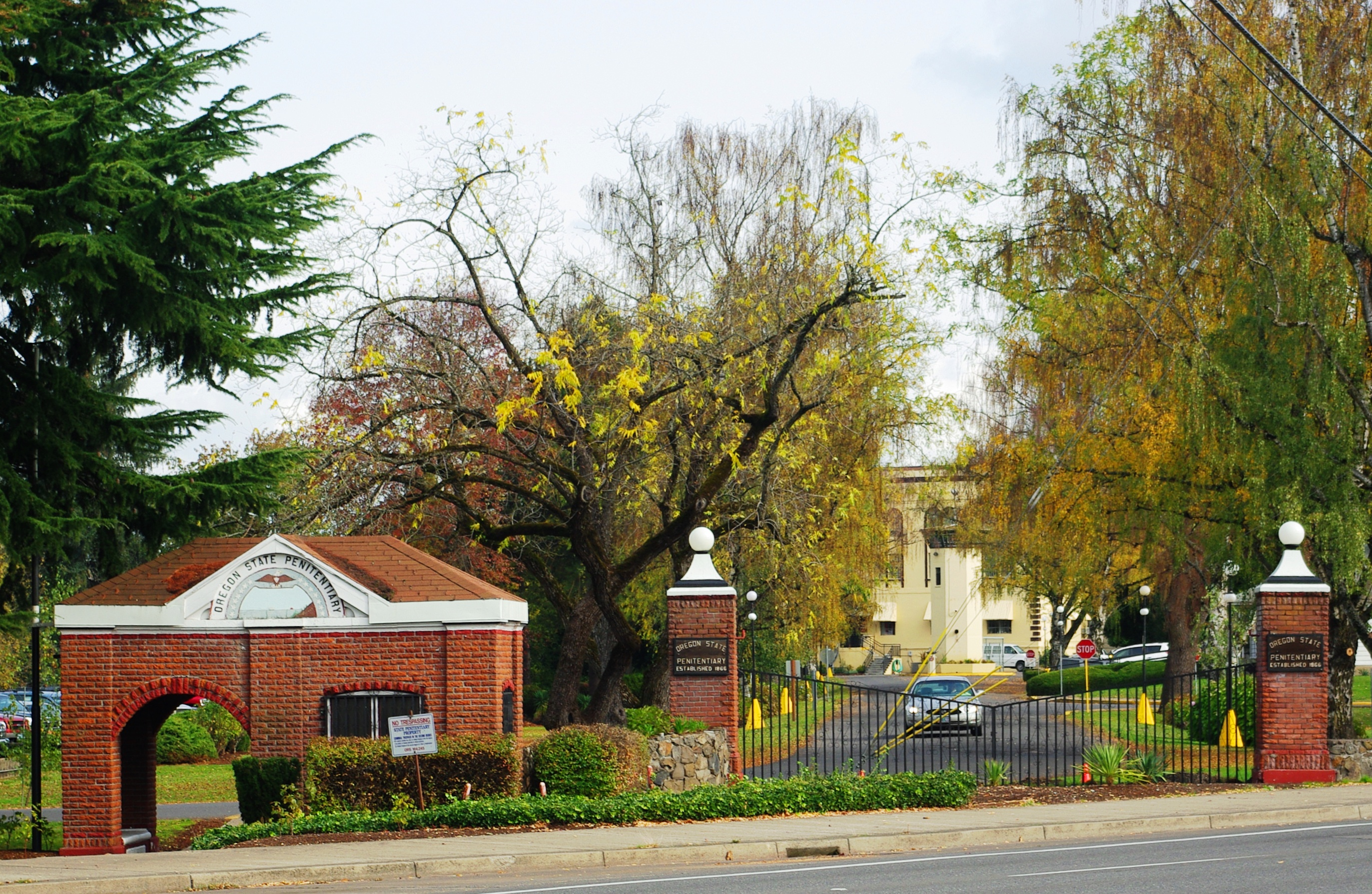
Oregon State Penitentiary

November 29, 2011 - Officer Buddy R. Herron; killed by a stranded motorist he stopped to assist while enroute to his shift at Eastern Oregon Correctional Institution.

November 17, 1994 - Officer Louis Perrine; killed in an accident while supervising an inmate work detail in Baker County, Oregon.

January 17, 1989 - Director Michael Francke; stabbed to death in the parking lot of the Oregon Department of Corrections headquarters in Salem.

April 7, 1972 - Lieutenant Robert Geer; stabbed to death by an inmate while attempting to subdue him at Oregon State Penitentiary.

April 11, 1969 - Officer Alvin Schmitt; succumbed to injuries sustained 2 days earlier when attacked by an inmate with an edged weapon at Oregon State Penitentiary.

August 12, 1925 - Officer James Holman; shot and killed by inmates with stolen weapons during an escape attempt.

August 12, 1925 - Officer John Sweeney; shot and killed by inmates with stolen weapons during an escape attempt.

September 28, 1915 - Superintendent Harry Minto; shot and killed while searching for an escaped inmate.

June 9, 1902 - Officer Thurston Jones Sr.; shot and killed by an inmate while he escaped from Oregon State Penitentiary.

June 9, 1902 - Officer Frank Ferrell; shot and killed by an inmate while he escaped from Oregon State Penitentiary.

June 9, 1902 - Officer Bailey Tiffany; shot and killed by an inmate while he escaped from Oregon State Penitentiary.

== Women At Coffee Creek Correctional Facility (CCCF) ==
The Real Cost of Prisons project highlights that 78% of women in prison in the United States have survived physical or sexual abuse. Additionally, that when who have a history of abuse or neglect as children have a 77% higher rate of arrest than that of women who were not abused. Surveys conducted by Portland State University of two-hundred women at Coffee Creek Correctional Facility (CCCF) also report display that many of the women in their facility have also survived domestic violence and childhood trauma. Of the two hundred women surveyed, 68% of the women who were in relationships when imprisoned, report that they faced physical, mental, and emotional intimate partner violence. In addition, in regard to childhood abuse and trauma 80% of women reported being emotionally abused, almost 70% reported being physically abused, and report being sexually abused.

Sexual abuse and rape has reportedly occurred at Coffee Creek Correctional, resulting in series of multi-million dollar lawsuits filed against the Oregon Department of Corrections. The Oregon Department of Corrections are being sued by five current and former inmates of CCFI for allegations of rape, groping, assault, and molestation at the hands of a nurse in the medical unit and guards that are charged with protecting incarcerated individuals.

In 2023, former Oregon Corrections nurse Tony Daniel Klein was sentenced to 30 years in prison after he was reported by nine inmates for some type of sexual contact during his employment which ranged from 2010 to late 2017.

In 2024, a Coffee Creek Correctional Facility guard named Nicholas T. Alexander, was investigated for allegations of misconduct involving female prisoners including having inappropriate boundaries with those he was guarding. He was placed on paid administrative leave on October 4. On December 9, Alexander was booked for driving under the influence of intoxicants. On December 11, four Washington County Sheriff's Office authorities went to the apartment where Alexander lived with his daughter and discovered he fatally shot his teenage daughter and himself in an apparent murder-suicide.

== See also ==
- List of law enforcement agencies in Oregon
- Oregon Youth Authority
- Oregon Criminal Justice Commission
- Harry Minto
- Harry Tracy
- Prison–industrial complex
- List of United States state correction agencies
- Incarceration in the United States
- Critical Resistance
