= Oregon Youth Authority =

Agency overview
- Formed: 1995
- Headquarters: 530 Center St. N.E. Salem, Oregon 97301
- Employees: 1,100 (April 2015)
- Agency executives: Joseph O'Leary, Director; Nakeia Daniels, Deputy Director
- Website: www.oregon.gov/oya/pages/index.aspx

The Oregon Youth Authority (OYA) is a state agency of Oregon, headquartered in Suite 500 of the 530 Center St. NE building in Salem. The agency operates juvenile corrections.

A juvenile crime prevention task force chaired by then-Attorney General of Oregon Ted Kulongoski recommended the creation of a separate juvenile corrections agency. The OYA was established as a distinct agency in 1995.

== Facilities ==
Facilities include:

Secure correctional facilities for boys:

- Eastern Oregon Youth Correctional Facility (Burns)
  - Harney County School District 3 operates the Monroe School inside this facility.
- MacLaren Youth Correctional Facility (Marion County)
- Rogue Valley Youth Correctional Facility (Grants Pass)
- Tillamook Youth Correctional Facility (Tillamook County)

Oak Creek Youth Correctional Facility in Albany is the state's only secure correctional facility for girls.

Transition and work study programs include:

- Camp Florence (Lane County)
- Camp Tillamook (Tillamook County)
- RiverBend Facility (Union County)
- Young Women's Transition Program (Albany, Oregon). The program was previously in Corvallis.

Hillcrest Youth Correctional Facility in Salem and North Coast Youth Correctional Facility in Warrenton closed in 2017. Youth at Hillcrest were transferred to MacLaren, and youth at North Coast were paroled out (if appropriate) or transferred to other OYA facilities.

The majority of youth served by OYA are in the community. OYA offers residential programs, its own foster care network and partnerships with Oregon's county juvenile departments, community providers and other stakeholders.
