= MacLaren Youth Correctional Facility =

Juvenile correctional facility in Oregon, U.S.

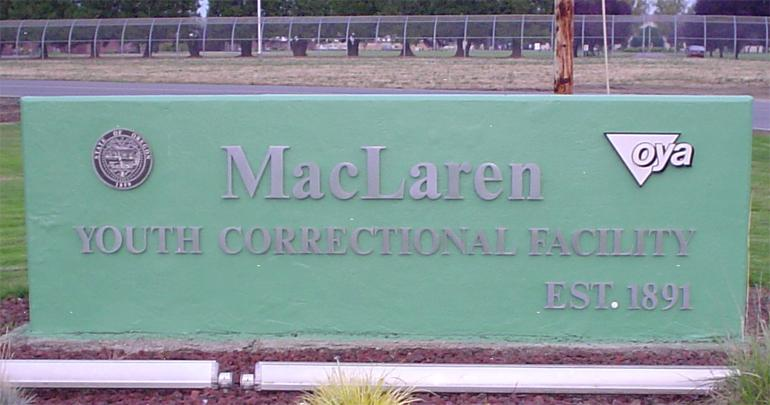
- Interactive map of MacLaren Youth Correctional Facility
- Location: Near Woodburn, Oregon; 45.1557°N 122.8201°W
- Status: Operational
- Capacity: 187
- Opened: 1891
- Managed by: Oregon Youth Authority
- Warden: Superintendent Troy Britting
- Website: www.oregon.gov/oya/maclaren/pages/default.aspx

MacLaren Youth Correctional Facility is a juvenile correctional facility in unincorporated Marion County, Oregon, United States, near Woodburn. MacLaren can house up to 187 youth. MacLaren is home to the Oregon Youth Authority's intake units and parole violation unit.

== Facility ==
MacLaren has 12 living units divided into two buildings, Valley and Courtyard.

=== Valley units ===
The Valley units each have a common room, kitchen, canteen, a dormitory with 20 people, and an outdoor patio. The Valley units are:

- Boulder
- Crater
- Dunes
- Fossil
- Haystack

=== Courtyard units ===
The Courtyard units each have 16 individual cells, several common rooms, and an outdoor patio. The Courtyard units are:

- Lake
- Maple (intake unit)
- Noble (intake unit)
- Oak
- Pacific
- Rockaway
- Summit

=== Lord High School ===
William P. Lord High School is a public high school located inside MacLaren. The school is operated by the Willamette Education Service District. All Youth at MacLaren who have not completed a GED or graduated high school must attend the school.
