= List of homicides in Oregon =

This is a list of homicides in Oregon. It includes notable homicides committed in the U.S. state of Oregon that have a Wikipedia article on the killing, the killer, or the victim.

The list is divided into three sub-lists as follows:

1. Multiple homicides. The state's largest multiple homicide was the 1887 slaughter of 34 Chinese gold miners at the Hells Canyon Massacre. Other notable multiple homicides include the 2015 Umpqua Community College shooting (ten killed in mass shooting on college campus), the Oregon Museum Tavern shooting (five killed in Ladies' Night shooting), the Bandon massacre (five killed in a home invasion), and the 2022 Bend, Oregon shooting (three killed at a Safeway grocery store).

2. Serial killers. Serial killers active in Oregon include Keith Hunter Jesperson, Robert Wayne Danielson, and Sebastian Shaw.

3. Individual homicides.

== Multiple homicides ==
Listed in chronological order

Incident	Location	Date	Deaths	Description	Sources
Hells Canyon Massacre	Chinese Massacre Cove	1887-05	34	Massacre of Chinese gold miners	
Ardenwald axe murders	Ardenwald	1911-06-09	4	Married couple and two children bludgeoned with an axe	
Lava Lake murders	Deschutes National Forest	1924-01	3	Triple murder of fur trappers, bodies deposited under surface ice of lake	
Murders of Larry Peyton and Beverly Allan	Portland	1960-11	2	Young couple disappeared, bodies discovered in a ravine	
Cowden family murders	Copper	1974-09-01	4	Married couple and two children disappeared from campground, bodies discovered months later	
1977 Klamath Falls nightclub shooting	Klamath Falls	1977-7-23	6	Mass shooting at a nightclub	
Oregon Museum Tavern shooting	Salem	1981-05-07	5	Mass shooting at tavern during ladies' night event	
Harry Charles Moore	Salem	1992	2	Executed for double murder of two relatives	
Leathers Oil Company murders	Gresham	1994-01-17	3	Employees of gas station shot and left in storage room	
Murders of Roxanne Ellis and Michelle Abdill	Medford	1995-12-04	2	Murder of lesbian couple	
Bandon massacre	Coos County	1996-05-09	5	Murder of five members of the Jacobs family in mass stabbing	
Thurston High School shooting	Springfield	1998-05-20/21	4	Teenager murdered his parents and shot multiple victims at school the next day	
Christian Longo	Newport	2001–12	4	Familicide by Starbucks worker who killed his wife and three children	
Clackamas Town Center shooting	Clackamas	2012-12-11	3	Mass shooting at a mall by 22-year-old man with AR-15	
2015 Umpqua Community College shooting	Roseburg	2015-10-01	10	Mass shooting at college campus	
2017 Portland train attack	Portland	2017-05-26	2	Fatally stabbed two men after confronted for shouting racist and anti-Muslim slurs at teenage girls	
Normandale Park shooting	Portland	2022-02-19	2	Shooting of protesters near Normandale Park	
2022 Bend, Oregon shooting	Bend	2022-08-28	3	Mass shooting at Safeway grocery store	
2026 Silver Rail Elementary School shooting	Bend	2026-10-15	5	Mass shooting at elementary school	

== Serial killers ==
Listed in chronological order

Incident	Location	Date	Deaths	Description	Sources
Earle Nelson	Multiple states	1926–1927	22–29	Serial killer known as "The Gorilla Man"	
Leroy McGahuey	Mineral, Central Point	1957–61	2–3		
Jerry Brudos	Oregon	1968–1969	4	Serial killer and necrophile, aka Shoe Fetish Slayer	
Douglas Franklin Wright	Oregon	1969–1991	7+	Serial killer	
Robert Wayne Danielson	Multiple states	1970–1982	7+	Serial killer responsible for 11-month killing spree through western states	
Thomas Eugene Creech	Oregon, California, Idaho	1974–81	3–43	Serial killer	
Jeffrey Paul Cutlip	Portland metropolitan area	1975–1993	3–4	Serial killer, rapist and necrophiliac convicted of 3 murders and allegedly confessed to a 4th	
Edward Delon Warren	Brookings	1976–1979	3	Serial killer	
John Arthur Ackroyd	Oregon	1977–92	2–7+	Convicted for murder of Kaye Turner, suspected serial killer	
Stanley Bernson	Oregon, Washington	1978–79	2–30	Serial killer and companion of Ted Bundy	
William Perry Jackson	Oregon, Washington	1980	5	Serial killer	
Randall Woodfield	Oregon, California	1980–1981	1–44	Serial killer known as the "I-5 Killer"	
William Scott Smith	Salem	1981–84	4+	Serial killer	
Darren Dee O'Neall	Multiple	1982–1987	1–6+	Suspected serial killer convicted of kidnapping/rape of 14-year-old girl in Portland	
Dayton Leroy Rogers	Molalla	1983–87	7–8+	Serial killer, aka The Molalla Forest Killer	
Keith Hunter Jesperson	Multiple states	1990–1995	8–185	Canadian serial killer	
Sebastian Shaw	Multiple	1991–92	3–13	Vietnam-born serial killer and rapist	
Cesar Barone	Portland area	1991–1993	4+	Serial killer	
Todd Alan Reed	Portland	1999	3–5	Serial killer and sex offender raped and strangled homeless women	
Murders of Ashley Pond and Miranda Gaddis	Oregon City	2002	2	Victims of serial killer Ward Weaver III	
Scott William Cox	Multiple		2–20+	Serial killer	
Andrew David Edwards	Multiple states	1987–1992	4	Serial killer	
Homer Jackson	Oregon	1983–1993	4+	Serial killer	
Richard Laurence Marquette	Oregon	1961–1975	3	Serial killer	
Jesse Lee Calhoun	Portland area	2022–2023	6	Serial killer	

== Single homicides ==
Listed by date

Incident	Location	Date	Description	Sources
George LeBreton	Oregon	1844-03-04	Official recorder of provisional Oregon government by Native American	
Peter French	Frenchglen	1897-12-26	Cattle king of Oregon shot in head by one of the homesteaders French sought to eject	
Killing of Alonzo Tucker	Coos Bay	1902-09-18	African-American boxer and gym owner accused of raping white woman and lynched by a mob	
Harry Minto	Albany	1915-09-27	Superintendent of Oregon state Penitentiary killed by escaped inmate	
John K. Giles	Oregon		Sentenced to life in prison but escaped	
Robert Folkes	Train near Tangent	1943-01-23	Black man convicted and executed for the murder of a white woman on a train, historical works question his guilt	
Oak Grove Jane Doe	Oak Grove	1946	Unidentified murder victim found dismembered in Willamette River	
Omar August Pinson	Hood River	1947-04-15	Escaped prisoner shot and fatally wounded an Oregon State Police officer	
Murder of Thelma Taylor	Portland	1949-08-06	Teenager abducted and murdered	
Jeannace June Freeman		1961	Murdered two children of her lover, first woman sentenced to death in Oregon	
Murder of Martha Morrison	Portland	1974-09	17-year-old girl disappeared from Portland, remains discovered 2015	
Jim Bradley	Portland	1982-02-20	Pro basketball player shot to death in an alley in Portland	
Diane Downs	Springfield	1983-05-19	Sociopath mother shot her three children, killing one, blamed carjacker	
Christopher Brathwaite	Eugene	1984-11-12	Sprinter from Trinidad shot by assailant with sniper rifle	
Cheryl Keeton		1986-09-21	Lawyer murdered by husband during divorce, found inside her van on Sunset Highway	
Murder of Mulugeta Seraw	Portland	1988-11-13	Ethiopian student beaten to death by white supremacists	
Michael Francke	Salem	1989-01	Director or Oregon corrections department and murder victim, subject of film Without Evidence	
Murder of Yolanda Panek	Portland	1995-07-13	Woman disappeared from motel with mattress soaked in blood	
Marion Eugene Carl	Roseburg	1998-06-28	WWII fighter ace and record-setting test pilot shot and killed at his home by burglar	
Murder of Brooke Wilberger	Corvallis	2004-05-25	LDS college student from BYU murdered while visiting Oregon	
Susan Monica	Wimer	2012, 2013	Murdered two handymen who worked at her farm	
Reynolds High School shooting	Troutdale	2014-06-10	School shooting by 15-year-old shooter	
Murder of Kaylee Sawyer	Bend	2016-07-24	COCC student murdered by a campus security guard	
Murder of Larnell Bruce	Gresham	2016-08-10	Black 19-year-old run over by a Jeep driven by a member of the European Kindred gang	
Murder of Daniel Brophy	Portland	2018-06-02	Chef and instructor murdered by wife at Oregon Culinary Institute	
