= Two Rivers Correctional Institution =

State prison in Umatilla, Oregon, US

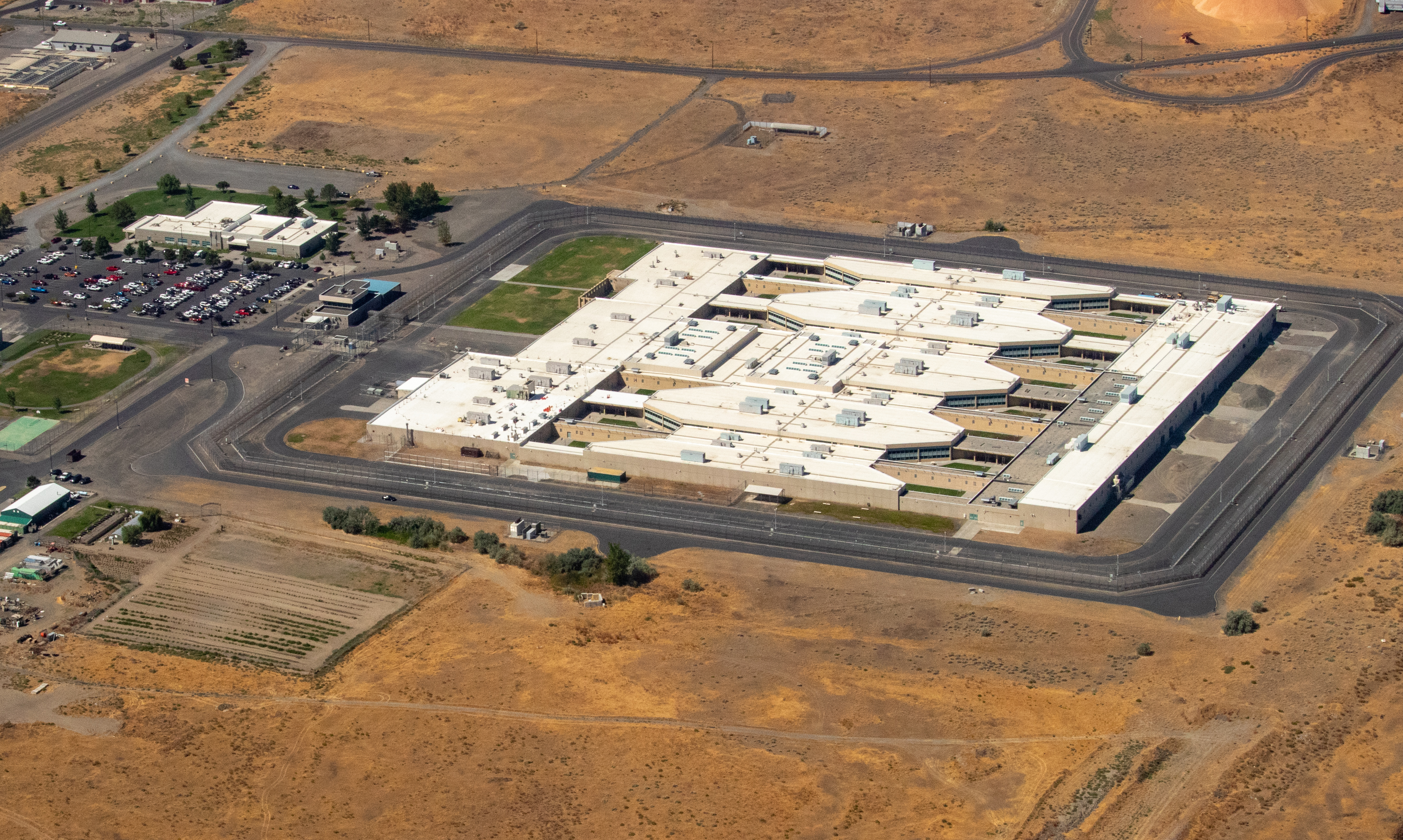
- The prison complex
- Interactive map of Two Rivers Correctional Institution
- Location: 82911 Beach Access Road Umatilla, Oregon; 45°55′24″N 119°15′30″W
- Status: Operational
- Security class: Level 1–5
- Capacity: 1,632
- Opened: 1999
- Managed by: Oregon Department of Corrections
- Warden: Ryan Legore
- Website: www.oregon.gov/doc/about/Pages/prison-locations.aspx

The Two Rivers Correctional Institution is a state prison for men located in Umatilla, Umatilla County, Oregon on the Columbia River, owned and operated by the Oregon Department of Corrections. The facility employs approximately 440 people, with 280 of those being security personnel. The design of the facility departs from typical campus type prison designs, as it was intended to meet the state of Oregon’s constitutional mandate that requires all inmates to be engaged in productive work for 40 hours per week. The facility primarily houses inmates classified between custody levels 1-4 but can also hold level 5 inmates with special medical needs.

Groundbreaking for the facility began on April 5, 1997. Construction was completed and the facility fully opened in March 2000. The final housing unit was constructed in September 2001. Later that year, inmates took control of housing unit and assaulted two staff at the facility. A riot control team had to be deployed to quell the disturbance. The riot caused approximately $57,000 in damage. In 2002, a dialysis clinic was opened at the facility. As of 2016, it is the only dialysis clinic located within a male prison in Oregon.

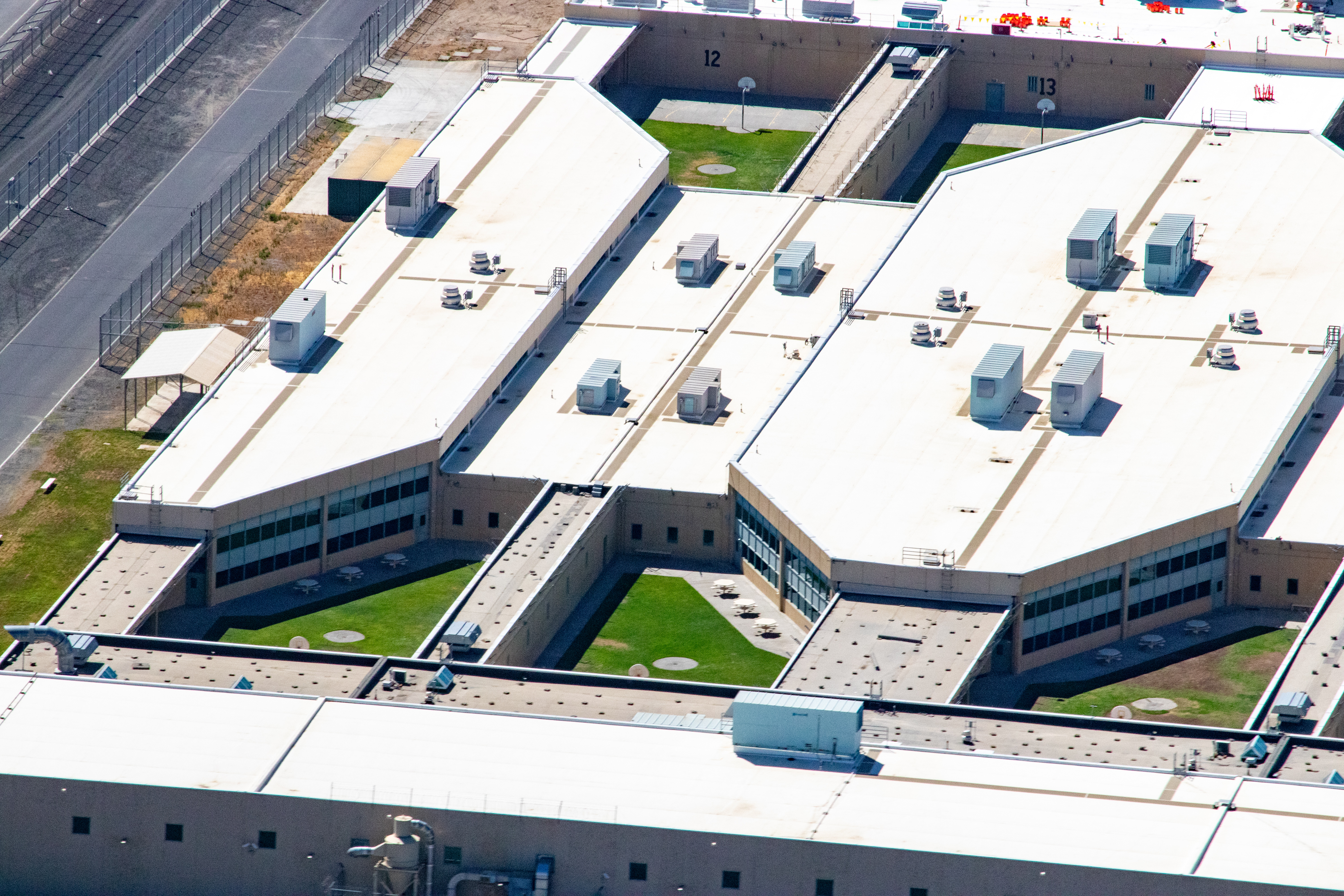
Aerial view of the prison's housing units and yards.

== Notable inmates ==
- Jeremy Joseph Christian (born 1982) was the perpetrator of the 2017 Portland train attack. He is serving two consecutive life sentences without parole.
- Ward Francis Weaver III (born 1963) was convicted of killing two teenage girls, Ashley Pond and Miranda Gaddis, in Oregon City, Oregon, in 2002. Weaver is currently serving two life sentences for the murders.
- Jeffrey Paul Cutlip (1949–2026) was convicted of murdering two women and a teenage girl in the Portland metropolitan area between 1975 and 1993. He was serving a life sentence without parole until his death in 2026.
- Joshua Abraham Turnidge – One perpetrator of the Woodburn bank bombing.
- Dayton Leroy Rogers – Also known as the "Molalla Forest Killer", convicted of six murders between 1983 and 1987. Suspected to have more than eight victims.
- Girley Crum Jr. - Perpetrator of the Bandon massacre, one of Oregon’s worst mass murders.
- Edward Morris – Convicted of the 2003 killing of his pregnant wife and two sons in Tillamook County, Oregon.
