= Larnell =

Larnell is a given name. Notable people with the name include:

- Larnell Bruce (died 2016), American murder victim
- Larnell Cole (born 1993), English footballer
- Larnell Lewis (born 1984), Canadian musician, producer, and educator
