= 1977 Klamath Falls nightclub shooting =

1977 mass shooting in Klamath Falls, Oregon, U.S.

1977 Klamath Falls shooting
- Uncle Albert's Lounge (Oregon)
- Location: 42.2249°N 121.7817°W; Uncle Albert's Lounge, 5711 S. Sixth St., Klamath Falls, Oregon, United States
- Date: July 23, 1977; 12:15 a.m. (UTC-5)
- Attack type: Mass shooting, mass murder, shootout
- Weapon: Colt AR-15 Sporter .223-caliber semi-automatic rifle
- Deaths: 7 (including an unborn child)
- Injuries: 3 (including the perpetrator)
- Perpetrator: DeWitt Henry
- Convictions: 6 counts of murder, 2 count of attempted murder

On July 23, 1977, a mass shooting occurred at the Uncle Albert's Lounge near Klamath Falls, Oregon, United States. 26-year-old DeWitt Henry, an unemployed truck driver, armed with a Colt AR-15 Sporter semi-automatic rifle, opened fire at the club. Six people were killed.

== Perpetrator ==
Henry was adopted as an infant in Bakersfield, California, by married couple Andrea Henry and Dewitt Henry. He was a 26-year-old, 6'3", 230 pound unemployed trucker at the time of the shooting, but he used to work as a bouncer at the establishment he would later attack. Prior to the shooting, he was convicted of negligent homicide.

== Attack ==
Henry got into an argument with Bill Ransom over a bar bill at the club located at 5711 S. Sixth Street. Ransom struck Henry during the argument. Henry said "I always liked you – just get on out of here." to James Williamson, the dishwasher at the establishment. After Williamson left, Henry opened fire, killing six people, including a pregnant woman. He also opened fire on two state troopers, who eventually arrested him after a gunfight, where the shooter was wounded.

== Victims ==
Deceased:

- Robert Dale Seater, 26, of Klamath Falls, Oregon
- Carrol Ann Seater, 23, of Klamath Falls, Oregon
- Michael Mortensen, 23, of Klamath Falls, Oregon
- Gary Lee Anderson, 27, of Klamath Falls, Oregon
- Andrew Walker, 22, of Medford, Oregon
- James Trueman, 25, of Kodiak, Alaska

== Trial and imprisonment ==
Dewitt Charles Henry was tried in Multnomah County Circuit Court in November 1979. He pleaded not guilty due to a "mental defect".

The jury did not believe the defense's arguments, and DeWitt was found guilty on six counts of first-degree murder and two counts of attempted murder. He was given six consecutive life sentences. He was not a candidate for the death penalty because Oregon did not have capital punishment at the time.

As of 2002, DeWitt Henry was incarcerated at the Oregon State Penitentiary without possibility of parole. Henry was incarcerated at the Snake River Correctional Institution, a medium-security prison in Eastern Oregon where he died at age 75 on 25 July 2026.

== See also ==
- 1981 Salem, Oregon shooting
- 1984 Autzen Stadium shooting
- 1998 Thurston High School shooting
- 2015 Umpqua Community College shooting
- 2022 Bend, Oregon shooting
