= Hank Vaughan =

American gambler and outlaw (1849–1893)

Henry Clay Vaughan aka Hank Vaughan (April 27, 1849 – June 15, 1893) was born to Alexander and Elizabeth Vaughan in the Willamette Valley of Oregon Territory. Vaughn became an infamous outlaw and gunfighter of the American West.

== Early criminal activity, prison sentence ==
At the age of 18, after having rustled Cayuse horses from the Umatilla with Dan Burns, Vaughan and Burns were tracked by Umatilla County Sheriff Frank Maddock and Deputy O. John Hart to their camp at Burnt Creek. On May 1, 1865, the lawmen engaged the two outlaws in a gunbattle. Hart and Burns were killed in the gunfight, and Maddock had a gunshot wound to the head. Vaughan was also wounded, but initially escaped. However, soon afterward he was captured and taken to jail in Auburn, Oregon, where he was protected from a gathered lynch mob by a citizen named John Hailey. Hank Vaughan was sentenced to eight years in the Oregon State Penitentiary.

== After prison ==
After release from prison, Vaughan lived a colorful life in the area of Pendleton, Oregon, engaging in frequent gunplay and supporting a lifestyle that included significant medical expenses and damages to taverns without having any noticeable means of income. He acquired a lifetime pass on the Northern Pacific Railroad when a gang robbing the train interrupted his nap on a trip home to Pendleton from Spokane, Washington.

Vaughan married into the Umatilla tribe and settled down, relative to his own youth, on his wife's ranch on the reservation. In 1891, the New York Times reported an incident at an auction for lands formerly part of the Umatilla Reservation. Vaughan had hired an attorney to bid on his behalf, and when the parcel of land he wanted went up for bid a gunfight broke out behind the building, an exchange of gunfire between Vaughan and one of his men. Vaughan's agent bought the property at what was described as a "ridiculously low price." No one was injured in the gunfire, which was reported to be the discharge of numerous blank cartridges.

== Death ==
Vaughan died when his horse, running through the streets of Pendleton, slipped on the first concrete sidewalk in Pendleton, Oregon. He fractured his skull on the gravel ground, after being thrown, head first, from his horse, at ~5:30pm May 31st 1893. He died on the 15th of June 1893 at 6 pm, after a surgery on his skull earlier that day. At the time of his death, the contents of his private safe included 6,000 dimes, a collection of seal finger rings, a large gold nugget and a collection of revolvers.
