= Murders of Larry Peyton and Beverly Allan =

1960s murders in Oregon

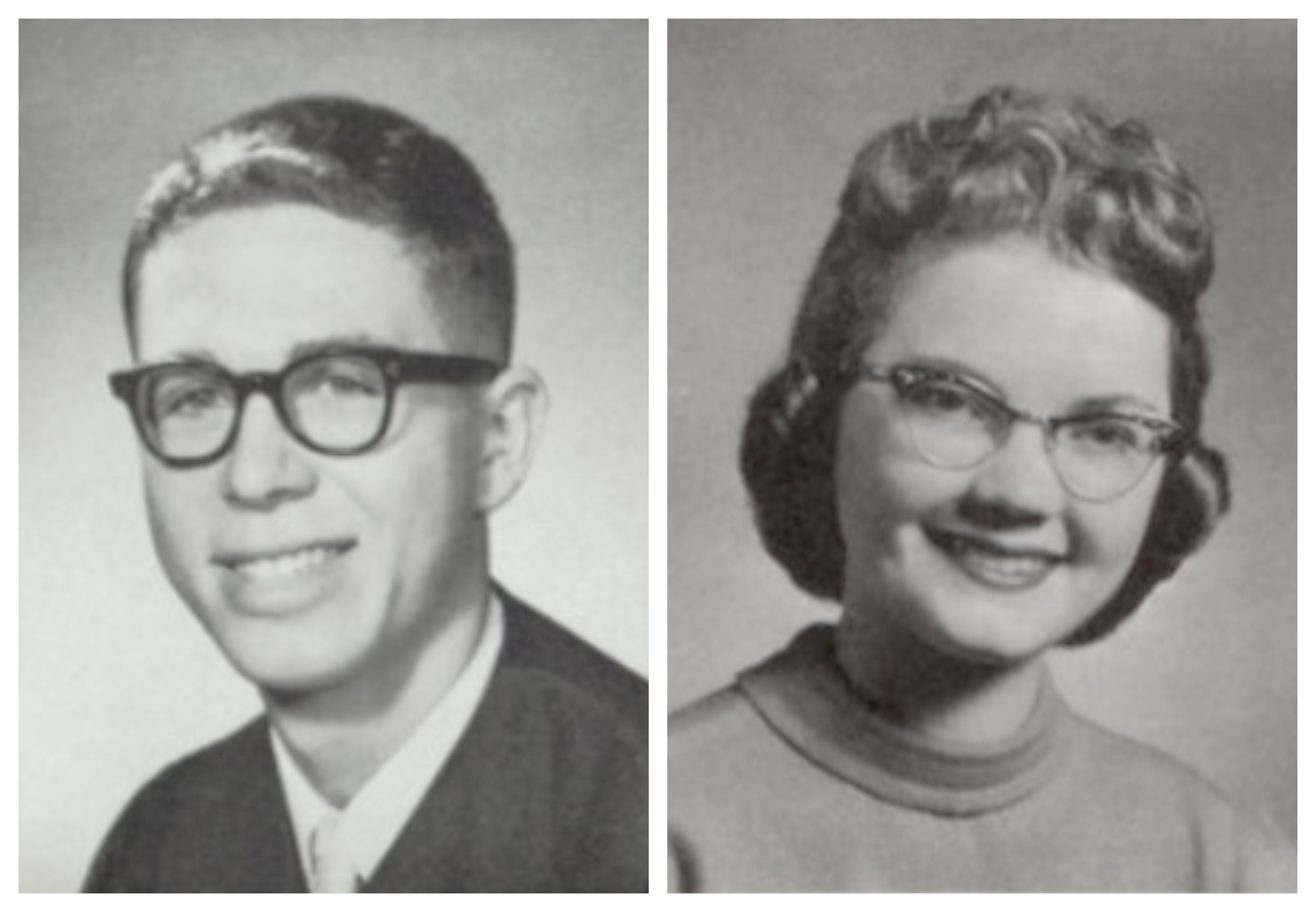
- Peyton and Allan in their 1959 yearbook photos
- Date: November 26–27, 1960
- Location: Forest Park, Portland, Oregon, U.S.
- Deaths: Larry Ralph Peyton; Beverly Ann Allan
- Accused: Edward Ralph Jorgensen; Carl Fredrick Jorgensen; Robert Gordon Brom
- Convicted: Edward Ralph Jorgensen; Robert Gordon Brom

On the evening of November 26, 1960, Larry Ralph Peyton (born March 4, 1941) and his girlfriend, Beverly Ann Allan (born May 16, 1941), disappeared after having made plans to shop at the Lloyd Center shopping mall in Portland, Oregon, United States. The following day, November 27, Peyton's 1949 Ford Coupe was found in Forest Park, with his mutilated body inside. Allan was missing from the scene, though her purse and coat were still inside the car. A widespread manhunt ensued over the following two months. In January 1961, a highway crew 30 miles (48 km) outside Portland discovered Allan's partially nude body in a ravine, and it was determined she had been raped and strangled to death.

The murders went unsolved for seven years until Edward Jorgensen, his brother Carl Jorgensen, and their friend Robert Brom were all charged with first-degree murder. Edward and Brom were convicted and Carl was acquitted. Edward and Brom both appealed their convictions to no success, but then Edward was released on parole after serving only three years of his life sentence, and Brom, after serving only seven. The possible innocence of the two has been claimed as a reason for them being paroled so soon.

The case received widespread national attention and has been credited by some journalists as "the most talked-about and written-about double-murder" in Portland's history. Some investigators have suggested that serial killer Edward Wayne Edwards might have committed these murders, as he was questioned early in the investigation, but was later cleared as it was confirmed he was not in the area at the time of the murders.

== Background ==
Larry Ralph Peyton was a 19-year-old sophomore at Portland State College in Oregon; his girlfriend, Beverly Ann Allan, originally from Port Townsend, Washington, was a student at Western Washington University. The two had met in the summer of 1960 while working at Crater Lake National Park, where Peyton's father operated a motor lodge. After spending Thanksgiving with her parents, Allan drove to Portland for a weekend visit with Peyton. On November 26, 1960, the couple made plans to go shopping at Lloyd Center before departing around 9:00 p.m.

== Discovery ==
=== Larry Peyton ===
On the evening of November 27, 1960, Peyton's 1949 Ford Coupe was discovered parked on a remote lovers' lane in Forest Park, northwest of Portland, with his body inside. He had been stabbed a total of 23 times with a 4-inch (100 mm) blade, and had also suffered a severe skull fracture. Mud was found on Peyton's clothing, suggesting he had been outside the car at some point during the attack.

Federal Bureau of Investigation (FBI) agents assisted in the search efforts and collection of evidence at the crime scene. Allan was absent from the scene, though her coat and purse, containing US$11, had been left in the car. A pair of crushed women's glasses and a broken women's necklace were also found inside, and a portion of a fingernail. A knife was found lying on the hood of the car, and Peyton's penknife was on the ground outside. A single bullet hole was discovered in the car's windshield, but it was determined that the gun had been fired from inside the car. Blood evidence was found both inside and outside the vehicle, but no gun was found at the scene. The car keys were found in brush nearby.

=== Beverly Allan ===
The search for Allan began after the discovery of Peyton's body. Her father, Robert Allan, offered a $1,000 reward for anyone with information leading to his daughter's whereabouts. Sometime after the Forest Park discovery, a patron of a restaurant in Eugene found a message written in lipstick on the restaurant's bathroom mirror, which read: "I am being held in a brown Ford. Help me." A woman who a witness claimed resembled Allan was purportedly seen at the restaurant with a man, but this claim was ultimately dismissed by police, as the witness, though able to fully describe Allan's features, was unable to describe the man in any detail.

On January 9, 1961, Allan's remains were located by highway workers approximately 30 miles (48 km) west from Portland in a ravine along Sunset Highway. She was lying face-down and was nude from the waist up, wearing only dark grey stockings. One of her shoes, her ski sweater and a blouse were lying nearby. Her hands were bound with green nylon cord. Near the body was a plastic sheet covered in red stains that appeared to be blood. An autopsy confirmed that Allan's cause of death was strangulation (possibly with rope) and it was estimated she had died between 3:00 a.m. and 7:00 a.m. on November 27. There were signs that Allan had been sexually assaulted prior to her death. Additionally, the partial fingernail found in Peyton's car matched the remaining nail on one of Allan's fingers.

== Investigation ==
Police began questioning the owners of two abandoned cars that were found near the site of Allan's body; one belonged to a United States Navy sailor stationed in Astoria, the other to a young man from Banks who claimed the car had become stuck in the mud, resulting in him abandoning it. Police stated at the time of that they believed Peyton and Allan had been ambushed by at least two men. Edward Wayne Edwards, a fugitive and serial killer who had ties to Portland, was considered a suspect, but was cleared when it was concluded he had not been in the area on the date of the murders.

According to the lead investigator, Earl Son, 2,292 individuals were questioned over the course of the investigation. A total of 453 suspects were considered, only 47 of whom were definitively cleared. Approximately $250,000 was spent in search and investigation efforts.

=== Edward and Carl Jorgensen ===
In October 1966, Son received a letter from a woman who claimed to have information regarding the murders. Identified as Nikki Essex, the author divulged information that would have only been known to person(s) at the scene of the crime, including a large house party that occurred near the Forest Park crime scene on the night of the attack, and the fact that a knife had been left on the hood of Peyton's car. Essex implicated 36-year-old Edward Jorgensen and his brother, Carl Jorgensen (age 27) in the murders. Edward was a married father of five children who operated a garage. Carl was a former boxer and salesman at an upscale Portland shoe store. According to Essex, both brothers had attended the house party in Forest Park on the night of the murders.

When detectives questioned Jorgensen's mother at her Portland home, she vehemently denied that her sons had any involvement and stated: "You're barking up the wrong tree, just because my boys went to a party in the West Hills the night of the murder." In April 1968, Multnomah County police offered $500 for "more information" leading to the identity of the perpetrators, which was increased to $750 in May.

== Indictment and trial ==
On August 13, 1968, a grand jury brought an indictment against Edward Jorgensen, Carl Jorgensen, and 28-year-old Robert Gordon Brom. Brom, a resident of Salem, had previously been imprisoned for beating an elderly grocer with a gun in 1962 and was on parole at the time of the murders. Edward was arrested in the middle of the night at his home, while Carl was apprehended at the shoe store where he worked. All three men protested their arrests and pled not guilty to charges of murder.

Trials in the murders began in early November 1968, beginning with the Jorgensens. Trial testimony revealed that the brothers and Brom had attended a party on the night of the killings. Essex provided testimony as the prosecution's star witness, stating that Edward and Brom encountered Peyton and Allan while returning from a beer run and invited them to the party. Peyton and Allan agreed, and followed them in the direction of the party. During the drive, the two cars began to race, and Peyton forced Brom's vehicle into a curb, damaging it. Brom returned to the party and obtained another vehicle; Essex, Edward, and Carl went along as passengers. Essex testified that Brom shortly located Peyton's car, and chased it down a dead-end road in Forest Park. The three men exited the car and began a confrontation, during which Essex fled on foot to the main road. There she claimed to have heard a "loud crack" that "sounded like a gunshot." Shortly after, the trio, along with Allan, returned to the main road in Brom's vehicle and picked up Essex. Brom dropped Essex off at her home, and he, Edward, Carl, and Allan left. Essex's testimony was questioned by Edward's attorney, Charles Paulson, who pointed out that she had undergone hypnosis and sodium amytal treatments in an attempt to recall the events of the night.

In late November 1968, Edward was convicted of first-degree murder in Allan's death, and second-degree murder in Peyton's. He was sentenced to life imprisonment plus 25 years. Ninety witnesses were called during his trial, including his brother Carl, who testified that he had no involvement. Closing arguments in Carl's trial occurred on December 5, 1968, and he was ultimately acquitted of first-degree murder. Brom was convicted of first-degree murder of Peyton in early 1969, and sentenced to life imprisonment plus 25 years.

== Aftermath ==
=== Petitions and parole ===
In the spring of 1972, both Edward and Brom filed appeals of their convictions, claiming that Essex was psychologically unstable and had not undergone a competency evaluation before testifying in court. The validity of her testimony was also questioned as she had undergone hypnosis and sodium amytal treatments to regain memory of the murders. The Oregon Supreme Court, however, ultimately denied a review. On December 23, 1972, Brom was denied a bid for parole.

In 1975, Brom filed for a second appeal, claiming his attorney had failed to adequately represent him. Douglas Tatting, a private investigator who claimed to have worked on the case, testified during the appeal that a witness had told him Allan was alive on December 28, 1960, over a month after the prosecution claimed she had died. The witness claimed that they had seen Allan at a party held by a local gang on the night of December 28, and that she was being prostituted to partygoers.

Edward was released on parole after serving three years in prison, and in January 1976, both he and Brom filed relief petitions seeking exoneration in the murder charges. Brom was paroled after serving seven years of his sentence.

=== Subsequent theories ===
Journalist Phil Stanford, in 2010, stated that he felt Edward and Brom were paroled so soon for such a high-profile crime because law enforcement did not actually believe in their guilt. He alleged that Essex was given sodium amytal treatments and hypnosis while visiting the crime scene, "until she came up with a story that fit their version of what happened." He also claimed that law enforcement were careless with their investigation, losing vaginal swabs from Allan's body as well as "ruining" the crime scene: "They didn't secure it, and people were walking all over the place, reporters and photographers and cops, leaving footprints and dropping cigarette butts."

Stanford states that Edward Wayne Edwards, a convict who had been a suspect early in the investigation, may have committed the murders, and cites a 1980 double-murder in Wisconsin that is a "virtual carbon copy" of the Peyton-Allan murders, as evidence. When Edwards was originally questioned in the case, he had a bullet hole in his arm; however, in letter correspondence between Stanford and Edwards, Edwards denied involvement in the Peyton-Allen murders and claimed he had sustained the bullet injury after his girlfriend shot him during an argument.

== See also ==
- List of homicides in Oregon
