= Michael Finkel =

American journalist and memoirist

Michael Finkel (born 1969) is a journalist and memoirist, who has written non-fiction books about criminals and marginals.

His autobiographical novel about his strange relationship with the killer Christian Longo who took his identity was made into a film True Story in 2015, and his role was played by Jonah Hill.

== Career ==
In 1990 Finkel took a job with Skiing magazine, and wrote about sports for Sports Illustrated and National Geographic Adventure. He later worked for The New York Times Magazine.

Finkel was a writer for The New York Times until 2002, when he was discovered to have created a composite protagonist for a story on the slave trade within Africa. The story, published in 2001 and titled "Is Youssouf Malé A Slave?", purported to profile an adolescent West African boy, Youssouf Malé, who had sold himself into slavery on a cocoa plantation in the Ivory Coast. The story as published included photographs, including one described as being that of Malé. However, after publication, an official from Save the Children contacted Finkel to say that the boy pictured was not Malé. Upon questioning by his editors, Finkel admitted that the boy profiled in the article was a composite of several boys he had interviewed, including one named Youssouf Malé. Finkel was subsequently fired. Initially, Finkel had pitched a story about child slavery to The New York Times, but his reporting did not uncover proof of enslavement. Instead, he encountered teenagers working for meager wages in difficult conditions, leading him to create the composite character to fit the narrative he had proposed.

After his dismissal from The New York Times, Finkel learned that Christian Longo, an Oregon man who murdered his wife and three children in December 2001, had used "Michael Finkel" as an alias during his several weeks as a fugitive. After Longo's capture the next month, Finkel communicated with him. Finkel says that, before the trial, Longo had hoped the journalist would bring out "the real story" to help him win acquittal; after his conviction, Longo gave Finkel interviews admitting his guilt. Finkel wrote a memoir about their relationship, True Story: Murder, Memoir, Mea Culpa (2005).

He later worked on National Geographic magazine, lived for seven years in France, and returned to the United States in 2021.

== Bibliography ==
- Alpine Circus. Alpine Circus: A Skier's Exotic Adventures at the Snowy Edge of the World (1999). Collection of memoir novellas.
- True Story: Murder, Memoir, Mea Culpa (2005) about Christian Longo. A film adaptation was released in April 2015, starring Jonah Hill as Finkel and James Franco as Longo.
- The Stranger in the Woods: The Extraordinary Story of the Last True Hermit (2017) about Christopher Thomas Knight, a hermit who lived alone in woods in the North Pond area of Maine for 27 years.
- The Art Thief: A True Story of Love, Crime, and a Dangerous Obsession (2023) about Stéphane Breitwieser.

== Honors and awards ==
- True Story was nominated for an Edgar Award for Best Fact Crime (2006).
- In 2008, Finkel and photographer John Stanmeyer won the National Magazine Award for photojournalism for "Bedlam in the Blood: Malaria", published in National Geographic (July 2007).
- The Art Thief was named a Best Book of the Year by The Washington Post, The New Yorker, and Lit Hub.

== Links ==
- https://www.michaelfinkel.com/
