= Edward Edwards (serial killer) =

American serial killer (1933–2011)

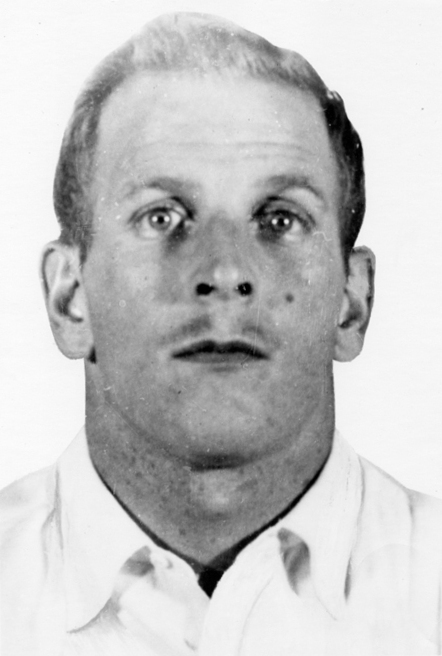
- Photograph taken 1959
- Born: Charles Wayne Murray; June 14, 1933; Akron, Ohio, U.S.
- Died: April 7, 2011 (aged 77); Columbus, Ohio, U.S.
- Other name: Wayne
- Convictions: Wisconsin; First Degree Intentional Homicide (2 counts); Ohio; Aggravated Murder (3 counts); Aggravated Robbery
- Penalty: Wisconsin; Life imprisonment Ohio; Death

Details
- Victims: 5 confirmed, 9–15+ suspected
- Span of crimes: 1977–1996
- Country: United States
- States: Ohio, Wisconsin
- Date apprehended: 2009

Edward Wayne Edwards (born Charles Wayne Murray; June 14, 1933 – April 7, 2011) was an American serial killer, rapist, prison escapee, and fugitive. After committing a series of gas station holdups in the 1950s and early 1960s, he was put on the FBI's Ten Most Wanted Fugitives list, leading to his capture in 1962. After his release from prison on parole in 1967, Edwards murdered at least five people between 1977 and 1996 in Ohio and Wisconsin. He was apprehended for these crimes in 2009 and died in 2011.

== Background ==
Edwards was born in Akron, Ohio, in 1933. In his autobiography Edwards wrote that he grew up in an orphanage, and that he was abused both physically and emotionally by nuns there.

Edwards was allowed out of juvenile detention to join the U.S. Marines, but he eventually went AWOL and was dishonorably discharged. He traveled frequently during his 20s and 30s, working as a ship docker, vacuum cleaner retailer, and handyman, among other assorted jobs.

In 1955, Edwards escaped from a jail in Akron and drifted around the country robbing gas stations. He wrote that he never disguised himself during these crimes because he wanted to be famous. After spending several years as a fugitive, he was placed on the FBI's 10 Most Wanted list in 1961 following a 1960 escape from a Portland, Oregon, jail, where he had been held on suspicion of impersonating a Federal Officer. After his 1962 capture, he was imprisoned in USP Leavenworth, from which he was paroled in 1967. Edwards claimed that the influence of a benevolent guard at Leavenworth reformed him. He married and became a motivational speaker.

Edwards appeared on two television shows, To Tell the Truth (1972) and What's My Line? He wrote an autobiography, The Metamorphosis of a Criminal: The True Life Story of Ed Edwards, in 1972. By 1982 he had returned to crime, and was imprisoned in Pennsylvania for two years for arson.

Between 1974 and 2009, when not incarcerated, Edwards lived in more than a dozen different states using many false names, according to his daughter April.

In a 1993 letter to the FBI found in his papers, Edwards requested his criminal and history records for cities in 19 states, claimed that J. Edgar Hoover "more or less gave me permission to proceed" with his 1972 autobiography "after I assured him there was nothing in it bad about the FBI" and he was writing a new book about criminals he met while incarcerated, such as Tony Provenzano, Charles Manson and Jimmy Hoffa.

== Known murders ==
The first murders for which Edwards was convicted took place in Ohio in 1977. William Joseph "Billy" Lavaco, 21, of Doylestown, Ohio, and his girlfriend Judith Lynn "Judy" Straub, 18, of Sterling, Ohio, had been dating eight months when Straub's car was found in the parking lot of Silver Creek Metro park in Norton, on August 7, 1977, with her purse and shoes inside. Family members gathered in the lot the next day as Norton police, aided by a National Guard helicopter, searched the high weeds. There, they found Lavaco and Straub lying on the ground, shot at point-blank range with a 20-gauge shotgun. Edwards received life sentences for these crimes in 2010.

The second pair of murders, another double homicide, occurred in Concord, Wisconsin, in 1980, when a couple from Jefferson, Wisconsin, Timothy John "Tim" Hack, 19, and Kelly Joye Drew, 20, were stabbed and strangled. These are referred to as the "Sweetheart Murders." Edwards had been questioned at the time, but there was no basis to hold him. Almost 29 years later, his connection to the crime was established by means of DNA testing. Edwards' own child, April Balascio, tipped off police about his possible involvement.

Edwards confessed to the 1996 murder of his foster son, 24-year-old Dannie Boy Edwards in Burton, Ohio. The victim had lived with Edwards and his family for several years. Dannie's original name was Dannie Law Gloeckner. Edwards murdered Gloeckner in a scheme to collect $250,000 insurance money. Dannie Boy, a soldier in the United States Army, was persuaded by Edwards to go AWOL from the Army and taken by him to the woods near his house in Burton, Ohio. There, Edwards shot him twice in the face, killing him, and left his body in a shallow grave, where it was later discovered by a hunter. Edwards was sentenced to death for this crime in March 2011. He died in prison of natural causes a month later.

=== Arrest and conviction ===
In 2009, Edwards was arrested for murder in Louisville, Kentucky. Neighbors described him as pleasant and neighborly. In 2010, he pleaded guilty to the murders of Billy Lavaco and Judith Straub, in Norton, Ohio; and Tim Hack and Kelly Drew, in Concord, Wisconsin.

Soon after, in a jailhouse interview, Edwards confessed to killing his foster son, Dannie Law Gloeckner, 25. In 2011, he was sentenced to death for that killing.

== Death ==
Edwards was found dead in his jail cell at the Corrections Medical Center in Columbus, Ohio, on April 7, 2011. His death was believed to be from natural causes.

== Other possible murders ==
According to Phil Stanford in his book The Peyton-Allan Files, Edwards may have been responsible for the murders of Beverly Allan and Larry Peyton in Portland, Oregon, in 1960. Two men were arrested and imprisoned for these murders, but released from prison early. Authorities maintain that the correct persons were prosecuted.

In March 2017, Detective Chad Garcia of the Jefferson County Sheriff's Office who was in charge of the "Sweetheart Murders" case described how the murders of Hack and Drew were solved following a tip off from Edwards' daughter. Garcia said he was "pretty confident" there are at least five to seven more murders Edwards committed and "who knows beyond that." He gave a list of 15 confirmed and suspected victims, adding that he was less sure Edwards was involved in the Zodiac killings.

Retired homicide detective John Cameron speculated that Edwards was responsible for several high-profile cases, including the Zodiac killings in the Bay Area of California and the murder of JonBenét Ramsey. However, his claims have proven highly controversial.

== In media ==
In October 1972, Edwards appeared on the television game show To Tell The Truth, claiming to be reformed and denying having committed any murders.

A former police detective and cold case investigator, J.A. Cameron published a true crime book It's Me – Edward Wayne Edwards, the serial killer you never heard of, in 2014, claiming that along with other murders Edwards hadn't confessed to, that Edwards was the Zodiac Killer. The book and Cameron's claims were "met with almost universal disdain, especially from law enforcement".

In 2017, A&E broadcast a Cold Case Files episode describing the murders of Tim Hack and Kelly Drew. The name of the episode is "Sweethearts, Silenced".

In 2018, Investigation Discovery broadcast the People Magazine Investigates episode titled My Father, the Serial Killer which tells the story of how Edwards' daughter realized her father had committed the so-called "Sweetheart Murders" and tipped off authorities, leading to his arrest and conviction. The daughter told People that Edwards had a dark side, verbally and physically abusing her mother Kay, and making the children watch videos about the Zodiac Killer while screaming, "that's not how it happened!" In the episode, she affirmed that she thought her father was also the Zodiac Killer.

In April 2018, A&E aired a six part series, It Was Him: The many murders of Ed Edwards. According to an article in Rolling Stone by Amelia Mcdonell-Parry, Larry Harnish, who had also researched the Black Dahlia case, ridiculed Cameron's use of a website which Cameron believes was authored by Edwards; Cameron's efforts to reach out to Kathleen Zellner, attorney for Steven Avery, were unsuccessful, but in an e‑mail Zellner doubted that Edwards could have murdered Teresa Halbach, while citing no evidence which definitively excluded him; Mcdonell-Parry claimed that Cameron embellished his theories in the A&E documentary, citing a lack of evidence that the Zodiac Killer's hood was made of leather, but also noted that Detective Chad Garcia agreed that Edwards had committed more than the five murders for which he was convicted.

He features in a 2019 true crime podcast called The Clearing. The podcast story starts with the moment Edwards' daughter April Balascio realises her father might be involved in the 'Sweetheart Murders' and includes what came after, as well as delves into Edwards' past by way of Balascio's memories.

== See also ==
- List of homicides in Wisconsin
- List of serial killers in the United States
