= Leathers Oil Company murders =

1994 mass murder in Oregon, United States

- Leathers Oil Company gas station c. 1994
- Date: January 17, 1994
- Location: Gresham, Oregon, U.S.; 45.487357°N 122.398940°W
- Type: Mass murder
- Deaths: Virginia Kay Endecott; Rosealie Fey-Girtz; Mary Beth Carey
- Accused: Tyrom Walter Thies
- Convicted: Lawrence Benjamin Scherf; Lori Ann Stephens

The Leathers Oil Company murders refers to a mass murder that occurred in Gresham, Oregon, United States, on January 17, 1994. The victims were Virginia Kay Endecott (born July 15, 1946); Rosealie Fey-Girtz (born September 17, 1942); and Mary Beth Carey (born May 16, 1968), each of whom were employed at the Leathers Oil Company gas station. Their bodies were discovered in a storage room on the premises, each having been shot to death. The station was also robbed of approximately US$9,000.

Tyrom Walter Thies (born April 14, 1973), a former employee at the gas station who had been terminated for stealing in August 1993, was charged with three counts of aggravated murder, but disappeared a few weeks after the victims' bodies were discovered. Thies' cousin, Lawrence Benjamin Scherf, as well as his friend, Lori Ann Stephens, were both convicted and served ten years in prison for their roles as accessories to the murders.

The case received national attention, and was profiled on the NBC documentary series Unsolved Mysteries and Fox Broadcasting Company series America's Most Wanted. The crime was branded one of the most notorious murders in the Pacific Northwest by The Oregonian in 2016. As of 2021, the whereabouts of Thies remain unknown.

== Background ==
Tyrom Thies, a 20-year-old station manager of the Leathers Oil Company gas station in Gresham, Oregon, was suspended from his position on August 31, 1993, after allegedly stealing US$30 from the station. Thies had begun working at the station on April 9, 1992. After being terminated by the company's supervisor, Harry Staten, Thies returned the stolen money and formally apologized.

== Murders ==
Tyrom Thies
- Thies c. 1993
- Born: Tyrom Walter Thies; April 14, 1973; Oregon, U.S.
- Disappeared: February 9, 1994; Portland, Oregon, U.S.
- Status: Missing for 32 years, 8 months and 14 days
- Height: 6 ft 4 in (1.93 m)
- Criminal charge: Aggravated murder
- Wanted since: 1994

On the morning of January 17, 1994, a customer entered the Leathers Oil Company gas station and discovered the bodies of three employees: Virginia Kay Endecott, Rosealie Fey-Girtz, and Mary Beth Carey. Fey-Girtz was the mother-in-law of Carey.

Approximately US$9,000 was taken from the station's safe and cash register. Law enforcement determined that the victims had been taken into the storage garage of the station at gunpoint and ordered to lie face-down on the floor before each was shot in the back of the head, execution-style.

A break in the case came on February 10, 1994, when an informant called law enforcement with a lead. Law enforcement received Thies' name the next day. His Southeast Portland, Oregon, apartment was searched by law enforcement two days later.

On February 16, 1994, a Multnomah County judge signed an arrest warrant accusing Thies of three counts of aggravated murder, but law enforcement were unable to locate him. A federal warrant was issued the following day, claiming Thies fled to Idaho to avoid prosecution. Thies disappeared on February 9, according to the federal warrant's supporting complaint. His friend, 23-year-old Lori Stephens, and cousin, 20-year-old Lawrence Scherf, were questioned by law enforcement in early February. In an effort to locate Thies, notable physical details about his appearance were released to the public, specifically a distinctive tattoo of a black panther on his abdomen. In a flyer published by the Federal Bureau of Investigation in 1994, it was noted that Thies may have used the alias Tyrom Walter Crozier.

=== Arrests and convictions ===
Stephens was arrested on April 13, 1994, and charged with felony murder for driving the getaway vehicle from the crime scene. Scherf, who was also in the vehicle, was arrested two days later. According to Stephens's husband, she had driven both men to the gas station on the morning of the murders, but was unaware that Thies intended to rob the station. Stephens and Scherf remained in the vehicle while Thies entered and exited the station. Despite this, Stephens pleaded guilty to her charges on October 18, 1994.

Both Stephens and Scherf were convicted and served ten years in prison for their roles in the murders. As part of a plea-bargained agreement for their reduced prison sentences, both Stephens and Scherf agreed to testify against Thies when he is brought to trial. As of 2021, the whereabouts of Thies remain unknown. According to a 2011 profile of the case by America's Most Wanted, law enforcement assumed Thies was still alive and possibly still residing in the United States under a false identity.

== Publicity ==
The case was profiled on the NBC documentary series Unsolved Mysteries on January 13, 1995, and also received attention on the Fox Broadcasting Company series America's Most Wanted.

The crime was branded one of the most notorious murders in the Pacific Northwest by The Oregonian in 2016.

== See also ==
- List of homicides in Oregon
