= Christian Longo =

American mass murderer (born 1974)

- Oregon Department of Corrections mugshot of Christian Longo

FBI Ten Most Wanted Fugitive
- Charges: Aggravated murder; Unlawful Flight to Avoid Prosecution
- Alias: Christopher Longo; Chris Longo; Christian M. Longo; Jason Joseph Fortner; John Thomas Christopher

Description
- Born: Christian Michael Longo; January 23, 1974 (age 52); Iowa, U.S.
- Gender: Male
- Height: 6 ft 1 in (185 cm)

Status
- Penalty: Death; commuted to life imprisonment without parole
- Added: January 11, 2002
- Caught: January 13, 2002
- Number: 469
- Captured

Christian Michael Longo (born January 23, 1974) is an American convicted mass murderer who killed his wife and three children in Oregon in December 2001.

== Background ==
Christian Michael Longo was raised in Ypsilanti Township, Michigan. In 1993, at the age of 19, Longo married 26-year-old Mary Jane Baker and had three children with her. Longo and his family often encountered financial difficulties due to his reckless spending habits.

The Longo family lived in Newport, Oregon. Christian was employed at a local Starbucks, while Mary Jane was a stay-at-home mother. She was also a Jehovah's Witness and active in their local Kingdom Hall. By all accounts, the two devoted their time to raising their three young children. At the time of the murders, the couple had been married for eight years and enjoyed sailing and jigsaw puzzles in their spare time.

== Murders ==
The body of four-year-old Zachary Longo was found on December 19, 2001, in Lint Slough, a backwater of the Alsea River estuary. Divers located the body of three-year-old Sadie on December 22, less than a mile (1.6 km) offshore in the Pacific Ocean. 34-year-old Mary Jane and their two-year-old daughter Madison were found five days later. Mary Jane had been stuffed nude in suitcases found in the water near a ramp at Embarcadero Marina on December 27, 2001. Madison was found inside a different suitcase the same day, having been dropped off on the same dock. An autopsy revealed that Sadie and Zachary were killed by asphyxiation, while Mary Jane Longo and Madison had been strangled.

After he fled the United States, Longo was recognized at a hotel in Cancún, Mexico, on December 27, 2001. By that time, Longo was wanted in connection with the murder of his wife and three children. The next day, in Lincoln County, Oregon, a federal arrest warrant issued in the United States District Court for the District of Oregon charged him with multiple counts of aggravated murder and unlawful flight. He left the hotel on January 7, 2002, and was captured six days later without incident in the small town of Tulum, Quintana Roo, about 80 miles (130 km) south of Cancún. He was taken into U.S. custody at George Bush Intercontinental Airport on January 14, 2002. He was sentenced to death in 2003.

Years later, Longo admitted to being a narcissist in a letter he wrote to a woman that was obtained by television station KATU-TV in Portland, Oregon. He wrote that he eventually began "studying what a psychologist said I was and came to terms with it, almost totally agreeing that he was right... his conclusion was the narcissistic personality disorder which he called 'compensatory' – basically self-centeredness related to a damaged core sense of self."

When in Mexico, Longo used the name of Michael Finkel, the former New York Times reporter who later chronicled their experiences in his memoir True Story, which was adapted into a 2015 film of the same name starring James Franco as Longo and Jonah Hill as Finkel.

Longo was incarcerated on death row at Oregon State Penitentiary. On December 13, 2022, Longo's death sentence (along with everyone else on Oregon's death row) was commuted to life without parole by Governor Kate Brown.

== Organ donation advocacy ==
In 2011, Christian Longo founded Gifts of Anatomical Value from Everyone (GAVE), which advocates for death row prisoners being allowed to donate their organs. Currently, most death row prisoners are denied requests to donate their organs because infectious diseases within American prisons occur at higher levels than the general population, such as widespread cases of HIV/AIDS, Hepatitis C, and tuberculosis. However, Longo has countered that death row inmates interested in donating their organs could undergo intensive screening far ahead of their execution.

== See also ==
- List of homicides in Oregon
- Bandon massacre
- FBI Ten Most Wanted Fugitives, 2000s
