= True Story (film) =

2015 American mystery drama film

- Theatrical release poster
- Directed by: Rupert Goold
- Written by: Rupert Goold; David Kajganich
- Based on: True Story by Michael Finkel
- Produced by: Dede Gardner; Jeremy Kleiner; Anthony Katagas
- Starring: Jonah Hill; James Franco; Felicity Jones
- Cinematography: Masanobu Takayanagi
- Edited by: Christopher Tellefsen; Nicolas De Toth
- Music by: Marco Beltrami
- Production companies: Regency Enterprises; Plan B Entertainment
- Distributed by: Fox Searchlight Pictures
- Release dates: January 23, 2015 (Sundance); April 17, 2015 (United States)
- Running time: 99 minutes
- Country: United States
- Language: English
- Box office: $5.3 million

True Story is a 2015 American mystery thriller film that was directed by Rupert Goold in his directorial debut. It is based on a screenplay by Goold and David Kajganich. Based on the memoir of the same name by Michael Finkel, it stars Jonah Hill, James Franco and Felicity Jones, with Gretchen Mol, Betty Gilpin and John Sharian in supporting roles.

Franco plays Christian Longo, a man on the Federal Bureau of Investigation's most-wanted list accused of murdering his wife and three children in Oregon. He hid in Mexico using the identity of Michael Finkel, a journalist played by Hill. The film premiered at the 2015 Sundance Film Festival and was released theatrically on April 17, 2015, in the United States. It explores the relationship that develops between the two men after journalist Finkel begins to meet with Longo in prison.

== Plot ==
In 2001, Christian Longo, an Oregon man whose wife and three children have been discovered murdered, is arrested by police in Mexico, where he had been identifying himself as a reporter for The New York Times named Michael Finkel. Meanwhile, in New York City, Finkel, an ambitious and successful reporter, is confronted by his editors about a cover story he has written for The New York Times Magazine in which he has used a composite character as the focus of his story, violating basic journalism principles. Finkel briefly attempts to defend his actions but is unsuccessful and is fired. He returns home to his wife Jill and struggles to find work as a journalist due to his public firing from the Times.

In 2003, Finkel is contacted by a reporter for The Oregonian, seeking his opinion on Longo's assumption of his identity. Unaware of Longo's case, Finkel is intrigued and arranges to meet Longo in prison. During their first conversation, Longo claims he has followed Finkel's career and admired his writing. Longo agrees to tell Finkel his side of the crimes he is accused of in exchange for writing lessons and Finkel's promise not to share their conversations until after the conclusion of the murder trial.

Finkel becomes increasingly absorbed with Longo, who is likable but evasive about his guilt. Convinced the story will be redemptive, Finkel visits Longo in prison and corresponds with him for several months. Longo sends Finkel numerous letters and an 80-page notebook entitled "Wrong Turns," which contains what Longo describes as a list of every mistake he has made. Finkel begins to recognize similarities between Longo and himself, their handwriting and drawing, and Longo's letters and Finkel's journals. As the trial approaches, Finkel becomes increasingly doubtful that Longo is guilty of the murders, and Longo informs Finkel that he intends to change his plea to not guilty.

In court, Longo pleads not guilty to two of the murders but pleads guilty to the murder of his wife and one of his daughters. Finkel confronts Longo, who claims he cannot share everything he knows because he has to protect certain people he refuses to name. Greg Ganley, the detective who tracked Longo down and arrested him, approaches Finkel and claims Longo is an extremely dangerous and manipulative man. He tries to convince Finkel to turn over as evidence all his correspondence with Longo. Finkel refuses, and Ganley does not press him for an explanation.

At the trial, Longo takes the stand and describes his version of the events in detail. After an argument with his wife about their financial situation, he claims he had come home to discover two of his children missing, one of his daughters unconscious, and his wife sobbing, saying she put the children "in the water." Longo says he strangled his wife to death in a blind rage. He says he thought his other daughter was dead at first but realized she was still breathing and strangled her as well because she was all but dead. Finkel's wife, Jill, watches Longo's testimony. As the jury deliberates, Jill visits Longo in jail and tells him he is a narcissistic murderer who will never escape who he is.

Longo is found guilty and sentenced to death. After he is sentenced, he winks at Finkel, who, to his shock and rage, realizes Longo has been lying throughout their conversations, using him to make his testimony more believable. A short time later, Finkel meets Longo on death row. Longo tries to convince Finkel he discovered his wife strangling their daughter and then blacked out, so he has no memory of the murders. Finkel angrily tells Longo he will not believe any more of his lies and will warn the judge of his manipulative nature when Longo appeals against his sentence. Longo retorts by pointing out Finkel's success with his book about their encounters, leaving the reporter shaken.

Finkel reads a section of his book, True Story, at a promotional event in a bookstore. Taking questions from the audience, he imagines Longo standing in the back of the room. Finkel is unable to respond. Longo says if he has lost his freedom, Finkel must have also lost something.

Title cards reveal that a year later Longo admitted to killing his entire family. The final title card says Finkel and Longo still speak on the first Sunday of every month. Finkel never wrote for the Times again, but Longo has contributed articles to several publications from death row, including the Times.

== Cast ==
- Jonah Hill as Michael Finkel
- James Franco as Christian Longo
- Felicity Jones as Jill Barker
- Robert John Burke as Greg Ganley
- Connor Kikot as Zachary Longo
- Gretchen Mol as Karen Hannen
- Betty Gilpin as Cheryl Frank
- John Sharian as Lincoln County Lobby Sheriff
- Robert Stanton as Jeffrey Gregg
- Maria Dizzia as Mary Jane Longo
- Genevieve Angelson as Tina Alvis
- Dana Eskelson as Joy Longo
- Ethan Suplee as Pat Frato
- Joel Garland as Dan Pegg
- Rebecca Henderson as Ellen Parks
- Charlotte Driscoll as Sadie Longo
- Maryann Plunkett as Maureen Duffy
- David Pittu as Marcus Lickermann

== Production ==
=== Filming ===
Principal photography began in March 2013 in Warwick, New York and New York City as well as some shots in Mexico City. Brad Pitt produced, along with several others, and Fox Searchlight Pictures distributed.

=== Music ===
Marco Beltrami was hired on July 18, 2014, to write the film's music.

When Jill visits Longo in prison, she plays him a recording of "Se la mia morte brami" (If you desire my death), a madrigal by the Italian renaissance composer Carlo Gesualdo. She explains that despite its beauty, she cannot hear it without remembering the facts of the composer's life: that Gesualdo murdered his wife, her lover, and their child.

== Release ==
The film was originally scheduled for a limited theatrical release on April 10, 2015. That release date was delayed for one week in favor of a wide release.

== Reception ==
True Story has received mixed reviews from critics. On Rotten Tomatoes, the film has a rating of 45%, based on 169 reviews, with an average rating of 5.44/10. The site's critical consensus reads: "James Franco and Jonah Hill make a watchable pair, but True Story loses their performances—and the viewer's interest—in a muddled movie that bungles its fact-based tale." On Metacritic, the film has a score of 50 out of 100, based on 40 critics, indicating "mixed or average reviews".

=== Accolades ===
Award	Category	Recipient(s)	Result	Ref(s)
Teen Choice Awards	Choice Movie Actor: Drama	James Franco	Nominated	
Teen Choice Awards	Choice Movie Actor: Drama	Jonah Hill	Nominated	
Teen Choice Awards	Choice Movie Actress: Drama	Felicity Jones	Nominated	
