= William Scott Smith =

Convicted American serial killer

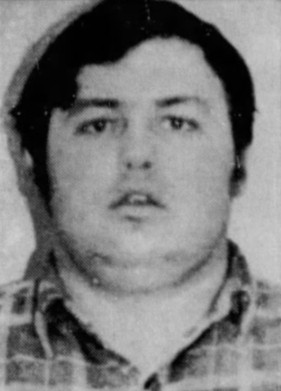
- Smith in 1984
- Born: April 29, 1959 (age 67); Portland, Oregon, U.S.
- Conviction: Murder (4 counts)
- Penalty: Life imprisonment (4 sentences)

Details
- Victims: 4+
- Span of crimes: 1981–1984
- Country: United States
- State: Oregon
- Date apprehended: April 1984
- Imprisoned at: Undisclosed prison in Washington

William Scott Smith (born April 29, 1959) is an American serial killer and kidnapper who abducted, sexually assaulted and murdered at least four women in Salem, Oregon from 1981 to 1984. For his known crimes, Smith was sentenced to four life terms, and remains a suspect in several other murders.

== Murders ==
=== Terry Monroe ===
On February 12, 1981, 21-year-old Terry Cox Monroe, a clerk at a Payless in downtown Salem, went to the Oregon Museum Tavern with some friends. After chatting and smoking cigarettes with them for some time, Monroe said that she would go outside to take a breath of fresh air, but did not come back. On the following day, friends and family became concerned for her safety, as Monroe did not turn up at work. The authorities were called in, and two hours into the search, her clothing and personal documents were found on the banks of the Willamette River. On March 15, a boater crossing the river spotted the body of a woman wedged amidst debris, and immediately notified the police. On the next day, the body was positively identified as Monroe's, with coroner Dr. Larry Lewman deducing that she had been strangled to death. A fund was soon established in her name, with the aim that the monetary incentive would lead to tips that could solve the case.

For a brief period, it was suggested that Monroe's killing may be linked to the I-5 Killer or the Oregon Museum Tavern shooting that occurred three months later, but both of these possibilities were quickly ruled out, and the case went cold.

=== Sherry Eyerly ===
On July 4, 1982, 18-year-old Domino's Pizza courier Sherry Melissa Eyerly was dispatched to an address on Riverhaven Drive to deliver an order. Hours later, her delivery car, with her collie still inside, was found abandoned on a dirt road outside of town. It was first discovered by pastor David Stark and later by George Hutmacher and his two sons, acquaintances of the Eyerly family who were out setting fireworks. Upon inspecting the address given by the caller, police learned that both the name and location were fictitious, and that the call-back number listed led to a motel. Despite extensive searches over the next few days, Eyerly's body was never found.

=== Rebecca Darling ===
On February 19, 1984, employees at a local Circle K store went to start work, only to find that the night-time employee, 21-year-old Rebecca Anne Darling, was missing. Her car, a Volkswagen Beetle, was still in the parking lot, and her purse, car keys and coat were still in the store, but there were no apparent signs of a struggle or anything being stolen. This was considered highly unusual, as Darling was considered a diligent worker who would never abandon her shift or leave her possessions behind. As a result, authorities were notified and a search began to locate her.

On March 25, a farmer tending to his cows found a highly decomposed body floating in the Little Pudding River, which was stuck in some brush. While it was apparent that the cause of death was homicidal in nature, investigators were initially unable to determine the race, sex or age of the decedent. The body was sent to medical examiner William Brady, and two days later, he positively identified the body as that of Darling. The subsequent autopsy determined that she had been strangled to death. After this revelation, police released the identikit of a man wanted for questioning, as on the day of her disappearance, the stranger had asked for Darling by name three times before her shift had even started. Around the same time, it was announced by investigators that there were no apparent links between Darling's murder and several other unsolved cases in the area, including that of Monroe three years prior.

=== Katherine Redmond ===
On April 11, 1984, the car of 18-year-old Katherine Ione Redmond, a freshman university student at the Alpha Chi Omega fraternity in Willamette University, was found abandoned at an intersection about two hours after she had left. Fearing that something might have happened to her, locals and authorities organized searches in attempt to locate her. Four days later, Redmond's nude body, bearing signs of sexual assault and strangulation, was found in a forested area outside Salem.

The recent murders attracted heavy media attention, with authorities issuing warnings for women to avoid travelling alone. In addition, there were reportedly increased sales for Mace and handguns, and student organizations organized escorts to protect female students.

== Arrest, trial and imprisonment ==
Shortly after Redmond's death, police focused their investigations on William Scott Smith, a 24-year-old unemployed truck driver with a criminal record for harassment against women dating back to 1977. At the request of district attorney Michael J. Brown, various newspapers were instructed to withhold his identity until he could be caught on a serious charge. In response to Brown's plea, the Silverton Appeal Tribune abandoned a plan to print Smith's name in an upcoming issue.

On April 23, Smith pleaded guilty to a misdemeanor charge for making harassing phone calls to a 20-year-old Salem woman that January. In lieu of his identification in the papers, district Justice Thomas C. Beck recommended that he be prohibited from access to furloughs. Two days later, he was officially charged in Darling and Redmond's murders. In response to the charges, some Willamette University students started distributing flyers advocating for the return of the death penalty in the state.

Shortly after, Smith was put on trial for the two killings. By then, he signed a written confession detailing how he had carried out both murders, but gave no discernible reason for carrying them out. It was briefly considered that he might suffer from a possible mental illness or extreme duress, but this avenue was abandoned after two psychiatric evaluations determined that he was sane. One of the psychiatrists, Dr. Wesley Weissert, described him as a "sexually sadistic serial killer" and "an extreme danger" who was highly likely to reoffend if released. His attorneys filed a motion to suppress the use of the confessions, which was denied by the court. As a result, Smith was found guilty of both charges on July 9, and during sentencing Justice Val D. Sloper called his crimes "heinous", to which Smith showed no visible emotion. He was subsequently sentenced to two life terms, each with a chance of parole after serving 20 years.

== Confessions ==
After being transferred to an out-of-state prison, Smith could not be conclusively connected to either Monroe's murder or Eyerly's disappearance, which remained cold cases for a few decades. The latter case garnered many tips after receiving several features on Unsolved Mysteries, but none of them led to convictions. In November and December 2006, Smith finally confessed to investigators that he was indeed responsible for Eyerly's murder. According to him, he and an accomplice, Roger Noseff, had planned to abduct another Domino's employee and hold her for ransom, but had mistakenly taken Eyerly instead of their intended target. Instead of proceeding with their plan, Smith strangled her and threw her body in the river. On December 18, 2007, Smith pleaded guilty to the murder and was given another life sentence; Noseff could not be arrested, as he had died in 2003 from cancer.

In October 2012, Smith confessed to killing Monroe, to which he later pleaded guilty and was given another life imprisonment term. It marked the first time that the newly-formed Cold Case Unit of the Salem Police Department, formed the previous year, had solved a case. As of November 2021, he remains behind bars, and is considered a possible suspect in other murders.

== See also ==
- List of serial killers in the United States
