= Robert Wayne Danielson =

American serial killer

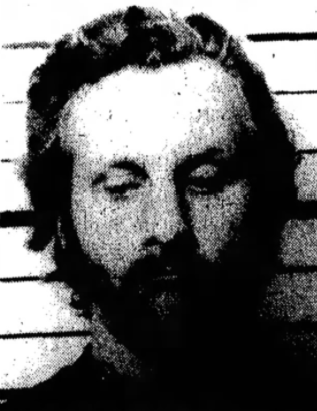
- Mugshot of Danielson c. 1984
- Born: Robert Wayne Danielson Jr. August 15, 1946; Iowa, U.S.
- Died: September 7, 1995 (aged 49); San Quentin State Prison, California, U.S.
- Status: Deceased
- Convictions: Oregon; Aggravated murder Voluntary manslaughter First degree robbery Being a convicted person in possession of a concealed weapon Illegal possession of narcotics California; First degree murder with special circumstances (2 counts); Kidnapping (2 counts); Robbery (2 counts); Burglary
- Penalty: Oregon; Life imprisonment California; Death

Details
- Victims: 7+
- Span of crimes: 1970–1982
- Country: United States
- States: Arizona; Oregon; California (confirmed); Idaho; Nevada (suspected)
- Date apprehended: April 6, 1984

Robert Wayne Danielson Jr. (August 25, 1946 – September 7, 1995) was an American serial killer who robbed and murdered six people in the Western United States between December 1981 and November 1982, particularly at camp sites or secluded park areas. At the time, Danielson was on parole for a 1970 manslaughter conviction. In 1995, nine years after being sentenced to death in California, where two of his murders occurred, he killed himself while incarcerated at San Quentin State Prison.

== Early life ==
Danielson was born on August 25, 1946, in Iowa. Although little was initially reported about his childhood, it was later revealed that Danielson had experienced depression and drug use. He also later underwent a religious conversion in prison.

== Murders ==
On June 23, 1970, Danielson got into an argument with 21-year-old Thomas Elroy Davis after a roadside encounter near Marcola, Oregon. After some time, Danielson brandished a gun and fatally shot Davis. He was charged with first-degree murder not long after, but after an initial mistrial, which resulted from the prosecution presenting improper evidence, that charge was dismissed. Instead, in November 1970, Danielson pleaded guilty to voluntary manslaughter and several other charges, although persisted that he only shot Davis in self defense. Nonetheless, he received a sentence of 25 years in prison.

In 1981, after serving eleven years of his sentence at Oregon State Penitentiary, Danielson was granted parole, and released from prison in November. On December 9, Danielson confronted 60-year-old Harold and 55-year-old Betty Pratt at a desert campsite in Arizona. He bound their hands with a rope, and shot both in the head, execution style, and later stole their pickup truck. The next day, their bodies were discovered, and their truck was found abandoned in Yuma. In the subsequent investigation, investigators put out a reward of $5,000 for information.

In the following months, Danielson, who was residing in Springfield, Oregon, became acquainted with 14-year-old Lenora Hart Johnson and the two sparked a relationship, with Johnson herself later stating it was "like a common-law marriage". On June 21, 1982, Danielson and Johnson attacked 62-year-old Arthur E. Gray at a park in Eugene. Gray, who had left his home earlier that day to go fishing, was bound by Danielson who proceeded to shoot him once in the back of the head. His body was found on June 25 by members of a youth group.

In July, Danielson, accompanied by Johnson, stumbled into 69-year-old Benjamin and 62-year-old Edith Shaffer at a park in Manchester, California. Johnson bound the Shaffers' hands with twine, and Danielson proceeded to demand she walk their dog away from the scene. When she was a far enough distance away, Danielson shot the couple to death. In November, Danielson murdered 38-year-old Ernest Corral in a similar fashion in Apache Junction, Arizona.

== Investigation and arrest ==
After murdering the Shaffers, Danielson retained their credit cards and campervan, although he would abandon it in Reno, Nevada. In December 1983, road workers in Manchester unearthed two bodies inside a ravine off Mountain View Road, later identified as the Shaffers through dental records. During the investigation, detectives named Danielson their prime suspect, as he had been identified as the man seen using the couple's credit cards. Detectives located Johnson, who confessed to being involved in the murders, but said that Danielson was the mastermind. She also told investigators about the murder of Arthur Gray, and the other murders which Danielson confessed to her.

Following this, Danielson was charged with two counts of murder, but did not surrender to the police and was considered a fugitive. On April 6, 1984, Danielson was located in Odessa, Texas, and he was arrested at his job at a traveling carnival.

== Trials ==
Danielson was to stand trial for the California murders first. During one day of his trial, Danielson's mother Mary Ann Bishop attempted to pass her son a loaded revolver as he entered the Mendocino Courthouse. The attempt was noticed, Bishop was arrested, and was given a 3-year prison term.

In July 1986, the jury composed of four women and eight men found Danielson guilty of killing the Shaffers, and on the basis of which made him eligible for the death penalty. Danielson pleaded for his life to be spared, even exclaiming during his testimony "I'm disgusted with myself". During the sentencing phase, his lawyers said that other infamous criminals such as Charles Manson, Juan Corona, and the Hillside Stranglers were sentenced to life rather than to death (Manson was sentenced to death, but had his sentence commuted to life after capital punishment was temporarily ruled unconstitutional, while Corona committed his crimes before capital punishment was reinstated). Two months after his conviction, the jury ultimately sentenced Danielson to death.

After the trial, Danielson was extradited to Oregon to stand trial for the murder of Arthur Gray. In February 1987, Danielson was found guilty, but was not eligible for execution due to Oregon's capital punishment statute not being in effect when Gray was murdered, so instead the jury imposed the sentence of life imprisonment on February 22.

== Death ==
For the remainder of his death sentence, Danielson was housed in San Quentin State Prison awaiting execution. On September 7, 1995, a San Quentin corrections officer named J.S. Spellman found Danielson hanging from a white tube sock in his cell. After unsuccessfully attempting to gain Danielson's attention, he signaled to other prison officials, who declared Danielson dead.

== See also ==
- List of serial killers in the United States
