= It Was Him: The Many Murders of Ed Edwards =

- Genre: Documentary
- Based on: It’s Me, Edward Wayne Edwards, the Serial Killer You Never Heard Of by John Cameron
- Starring: Wayne Wolfe; John Cameron
- Composer: Shrapnel Music
- Country of origin: United States
- Original language: English
- No. of episodes: 6

Production
- Executive producers: Jimmy Fox; Layla Smith; Gregory J. Lipstone; Wayne Wolfe; Kenneth Dale Borill; Leonid Leonov; Jackson Nguyen; Todd Crites
- Producer: Charlotte Glover
- Cinematography: Todd Crites
- Running time: 40–43 minutes
- Production companies: All3Media America; Main Event Media; Turn Left Productions

Original release
- Network: Paramount Network
- Release: April 16 – May 21, 2018

It Was Him: The Many Murders of Ed Edwards is an American documentary television series that premiered on April 16, 2018 on Paramount Network.

== Premise ==
It Was Him: The Many Murders of Ed Edwards follows Wayne Wolfe who "discovered that his real grandfather was the deceased killer Ed Edwards who was convicted of five cold cases in his 70s, but had potentially embarked on a decades-long murder spree. The series examines the infamous murderer through an investigation led by Wolfe and John Cameron, a cold-case expert and retired detective who has been investigating Edwards for almost a decade. Cameron’s meticulously compiled evidence has Edwards as the ultimate suspect in some of the most well-known murder cases, including the Zodiac Killer, Laci Peterson and many more."

== Production ==
=== Development ===
On November 10, 2016, it was announced that Spike had given the production a series order. The limited series was expected to air under a new "Spike Serialized" franchise for limited-run non-scripted series. The production was developed by Objective Media Group’s Jimmy Fox, who will executive produce, along with Wolfe and the showrunning team Jackson Nguyen and Todd Crites of Turn Left Productions. Additional executive producers included Leonid Leonov and Kenny Dale Borill as well as Objective/All3Media's Layla Smith and Greg Lipstone.

On March 16, 2018, it was announced that the series would premiere on Paramount Network on April 16, 2018.

== Release ==
=== Marketing ===
Alongside the announcement of the series' premiere, Paramount Network released the official trailer.

== Episodes ==
| No. | Title | Original release date | U.S. viewers (millions) |
|---|---|---|---|
| 1 | "The Killer Gene" | April 16, 2018 | 0.234 |
| 2 | "Slaves in the After Life" | April 23, 2018 | 0.266 |
| 3 | "Child Killer" | April 30, 2018 | 0.234 |
| 4 | "A Double-Life" | May 7, 2018 | 0.212 |
| 5 | "Mama's Boy" | May 14, 2018 | 0.211 |
| 6 | "The Nail in the Coffin" | May 21, 2018 | 0.109 |

== Reception ==
In a mixed review, The Hollywood Reporter's Daniel Fienberg described the series as "half outlandish serial killer conspiracy theory, half portrait of obsession, neither completely satisfying" and said that it was "often disturbing, occasionally entertaining, never convincing."
