= Murder of Larnell Bruce =

Racially motivated hate crime in the United States

On August 10, 2016, Larnell Bruce Jr. (born September 1, 1996), was a 19-year-old black man, was run over by a Jeep driven by Russell Courtier, a member of the European Kindred gang, outside a 7-Eleven convenience store in Gresham, Oregon. Bruce died from his injuries three days later.

Russell Courtier

In March 2019, Courtier was found guilty of murder and hate crime, while his girlfriend Colleen Hunt, who had been in the Jeep with Courtier, pleaded guilty to manslaughter. Courtier was sentenced to life with a minimum of 28 years, while Hunt received a 10-year sentence.

The case was the subject of a two-part BBC Two documentary series called A Black And White Killing: The Case That Shook America.

== See also ==
- List of homicides in Oregon
