= Jeffrey Paul Cutlip =

American serial killer (1949–2026)

- Cutlip in 2012
- Born: Jeffrey Paul Cutlip; June 15, 1949
- Died: March 29, 2026 (aged 76); Umatilla, Oregon, U.S.
- Other name: Jesse Andre D'Breeze
- Status: Deceased
- Convictions: Murder (2 counts); Aggravated murder
- Penalty: Life imprisonment without the possibility of parole

Details
- Victims: 3–4
- Span of crimes: 1975–1993
- Country: United States
- State: Oregon
- Date apprehended: July 2012

Jeffrey Paul Cutlip (also known as Jesse Andre D'Breeze; June 15, 1949 – March 29, 2026) was an American serial killer and rapist who murdered two women and a teenage girl in the Portland metropolitan area of Oregon between 1975 and 1993. He confessed to the murders in 2012 and was sentenced to life imprisonment the following year.

== Criminal career ==
In 1975, Cutlip entered the apartment of 44-year-old Marlene Claire Carlson. Upon opening her unlocked door, he found Carlson sleeping on her bed. Cutlip then pounced on her and demanded sex. When Carlson refused, he attempted to smother her with a pillow. When that did not work, he strangled Carlson to death with a telephone cord. He then sexually assaulted her corpse. Carlson was last seen alive on July 30, 1975, but her body was not found until August 7 of that year. Cutlip was a tenant in the same building but was never questioned by the police.

On April 4, 1977, Cutlip drowned Julie Marie Bennett, 15, to death in Johnson Creek. He met Bennett earlier that day at Johnson Creek Park. At about 4:00 p.m., the two went to a Corner Pantry Store, where they bought beer and cigarettes. Cutlip then lured her to his cabin, where he forced her to the ground, tied her hands around her back, and raped her for nearly two hours. After Bennett threatened to call the police, he took her back to the park and attempted to suffocate her. When he was unsuccessful, he pushed her head into the creek and held her underwater until she stopped breathing. He then dragged her body to the east side of the creek.

A friend with Bennett that day became worried after she did not return to the park. The friend alerted Bennett's father, and they began to search for her. Bennett's purse was soon found in bushes at the park, but her body was not discovered until two days later. Investigators believed her death resulted from an accidental drowning, but locals believed that Cutlip was responsible for her death, causing him to move out of the neighborhood.

In 1982 Cutlip entered a woman's home, gagged and tied her up, and sexually assaulted her for six hours. He was soon caught, convicted of sodomy and first-degree burglary, and labeled a sex offender.

On July 21, 1993, the body of Nielene Loribell Doll, 33, was discovered by a jogger off Southeast Bull Run Road near Sandy. Cutlip claimed Doll went home with him after they used methamphetamine together at a Portland bar. He then asked to tie her up for sex, but she refused. After a struggle, Cutlip strangled her to death. He later attempted to sexually abuse her corpse. He then placed Doll's body in the trunk of her car, dumped it, and left her car in a Fred Meyer supermarket parking-lot.

Seven months after his 1993 release from prison, he robbed two people while armed with a shotgun. He was arrested again and sent back to prison for six years.

In 2000, Cutlip was paroled again; however, he failed to register as a sex offender and left Oregon. In 2004, he was arrested again after coming back to Oregon to reinstate his Social Security disability benefits. Cutlip was released from prison again in December 2004 but sent back six months later after he groped a teenage girl in Northeast Portland.

Cutlip served two more years in prison until he was released again. In 2008, he left the state again after violating his parole conditions. One week later, he was caught in Bakersfield, California, and sent back to prison until his release on July 28, 2010. In January 2011, Cutlip left Portland again and traveled to Texas.

== Confession, incarceration, and death ==
In July 2012, Cutlip called the police from Brownsville, Texas, and confessed to murdering four women, although police were only able to confirm three of these murders. He was then arrested and held without bond in Portland, Oregon. In 2013 he pleaded guilty to two counts of murder and one count of aggravated murder in the deaths of Carlson, Bennett, and Doll and was sentenced to life in prison without parole. He was incarcerated at Two Rivers Correctional Institution in Umatilla, Oregon.

Cutlip died in hospice care at Two Rivers Correctional Institution in Umatilla, Oregon, on March 29, 2026. He was 76.
