= Dayton Leroy Rogers =

American killer (born 1953)

- Mugshot of Rogers, c. 1988
- Born: September 30, 1953 (age 73); Moscow, Idaho, U.S.
- Other name: The Molalla Forest Killer
- Conviction: First degree murder (7 counts)
- Penalty: Death; commuted to life imprisonment

Details
- Victims: 7–8+
- Span of crimes: 1983–1987
- Country: United States
- State: Oregon
- Date apprehended: 1987

Dayton Leroy Rogers (born September 30, 1953) is an American serial killer who has been tied to the murders of at least eight women. He preferred "street" women, usually addicts, sex workers, and runaways. The bodies of six of the women were found at a dump site located on privately owned forest lands outside Molalla, Oregon, and thus he was dubbed the "Molalla Forest Murderer".

== Crimes ==
Rogers was convicted in 1988 for the murder of his last victim, Jennifer Lisa Smith, whom he killed on August 7, 1987, and in 1989 for a further six murders for which he was sentenced to death.

Jennifer Lisa Smith was in Rogers' truck parked in a lot located off of SE McLoughlin Blvd in Oak Grove in unincorporated Clackamas County when he stabbed her 11 times in the breasts, abdomen, and back. She fell out of the truck and was attended to by witnesses from a nearby Denny's restaurant, later dying at the hospital. One witness stood by a window and described the attack to another patron who could not see the parking lot; that patron called the Clackamas County Sheriff's Office.

When the victim fell to the ground, several witnesses ran to their cars in an attempt to block Rogers' car in the parking lot. However, he drove over the landscaping and headed south on SE McLoughlin. One witness followed Rogers through Milwaukie, Gladstone, Oregon City, and Canby at speeds up to 100 mph. When the suspect's car pulled into a driveway, the following driver took the address, went to a phone, and reported the information.

Rogers' modus operandi was to pick up prostitutes and take them to secluded areas. He took at least six of them into the forest, tied them up, and killed them.

Rogers, who was married and had a child, was a small engine mechanic by trade and deeply in debt. He was connected to the bodies through his habit of pouring a mini-bottle of vodka into an orange juice bottle to make himself a screwdriver.

Rogers was convicted in May 1989 for the murders of 23-year-old Lisa Marie Mock, 26-year-old Maureen Ann Hodges, 35-year-old Christine Lotus Adams, 20-year-old Cynthia De Vore, 26-year-old Nondace "Noni" Cervantes, and 16-year-old Riatha Gyles. The seventh body was identified in August 2013 as 18-year-old Tawnia Jarie Johnson.

Rogers was sentenced to death three times, and three times the Oregon Supreme Court vacated the sentence of death and remanded the case for a new trial. The first two Supreme Court decisions came in 1992 and 2000. In both instances, a jury again imposed the death penalty. On October 11, 2012, the Oregon Supreme Court vacated his latest death sentence and remanded the case for a new trial on the appropriate penalty.

On November 16, 2015, a Clackamas County jury sentenced Rogers to death for the fourth time. According to his defense attorney, Rogers would have waived all future appeals and allocuted to his crimes in exchange for a true life sentence instead of the death penalty.

On November 12, 2021, his death sentence was overturned for the fourth time. This was due in part to a new law signed by Governor Kate Brown, which limited the amount of aggravating factors required for seeking the death penalty. On December 13, 2022, Governor Kate Brown commuted the death sentences of everyone on Oregon's death row to life without parole.

Rogers is currently incarcerated at Two Rivers Correctional Institution in Umatilla.

== See also ==
- List of serial killers in the United States
- List of homicides in Oregon
