= Omar August Pinson =

American murderer

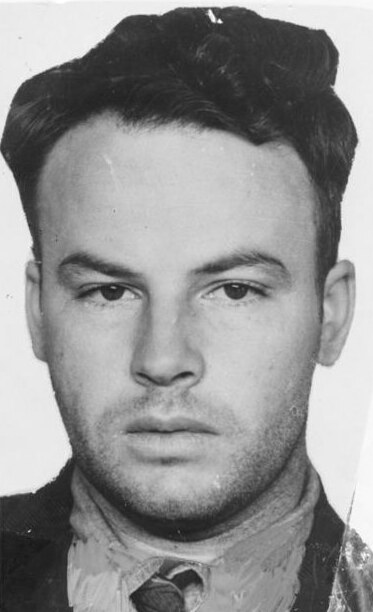

FBI Ten Most Wanted Fugitive
- Charges: Murder
- Alias: John Omar Pinson; Sam Cignitti; Joseph Anthony Dorian; D.C. Audell

Description
- Born: March 31, 1918; Joplin, Missouri
- Died: October 20, 1997 (aged 79); Los Angeles County, California

Status
- Convictions: First degree murder
- Penalty: Life imprisonment
- Added: March 18, 1950
- Caught: August 28, 1950
- Number: 5
- Captured

Omar August Pinson (March 31, 1918 – October 20, 1997), also known as John Omar Pinson, was an American robber and murderer who was on the FBI Ten Most Wanted Fugitives list in 1950.

== Biography ==
Pinson had been released from the Washington State Prison in 1945 after serving time since 1944 for burglary. He also served time at Missouri State Penitentiary for automobile tampering and the Eldora, Iowa State Reformatory on a charge of armed robbery. He had been captured within 24 hours by the Oregon State Police and local officers at Ordnance, Oregon after he shot and fatally wounded Oregon State Police Officer Delmond Rondeau on April 15, 1947, in Hood River, Oregon after a burglary. On May 24, 1957, he had been sentenced to life imprisonment at Oregon State Penitentiary for first degree murder after the jury recommended mercy. He became wanted in 1949 in eastern Washington and Idaho for burglary and was charged with unlawful flight on September 7, 1949, when he crossed state lines after he escaped on May 30, 1949, from the Oregon State Prison with a cellmate. He had evaded capture after a shootout with police on January 30, 1950, at Polson, Montana while burglarizing a hardware store. He was a prisoner at Oregon State Penitentiary after being arrested on August 28, 1950, at Pierre, South Dakota by South Dakota Highway Patrol and an FBI National Academy graduate.

Pinson was paroled in 1959. In 1975, Pinson, described as a "model parolee", later expressed regret for his crimes. He died in 1997.

=== Cultural references ===
- Gang Busters, a 1955 feature film starring Myron Healey as Public Enemy No. 4, in which he was portrayed as an unrepentant criminal mastermind.
