= Sebastian Shaw (serial killer) =

Vietnamese-born American rapist and serial killer

- Mugshot of Shaw taken by the Oregon Department of Corrections
- Born: Chau Quong Ho; November 28, 1967; Phước Tuy Province, South Vietnam
- Died: October 4, 2021 (aged 53); Oregon State Penitentiary, Salem, Oregon, U.S.
- Other name: Sebastian Alexander Shaw
- Conviction: Murder (3 counts)
- Penalty: Life imprisonment (3 sentences)

Details
- Victims: 3–13
- Span of crimes: 1991 – 1992 (possibly 1994)
- Country: United States
- States: Oregon, possibly California
- Date apprehended: For the final time on February 20, 1998
- Imprisoned at: Imprisoned at the Oregon State Penitentiary

Sebastian Alexander Shaw (born Chau Quong Ho; November 28, 1967 – October 4, 2021) was a Vietnam-born American serial killer and rapist responsible for at least three murders in Portland, Oregon, between 1991 and 1992. When interviewed by detectives in prison, Shaw confessed to killing ten more people. He is the prime suspect for the 1994 murder of 14-year-old Jenny Lin in Castro Valley, California. At the time of his death, he was serving three life sentences in the Oregon State Penitentiary.

== Early life ==
Born Chau Quong Ho in the Phước Tuy Province of South Vietnam on November 28, 1967, he was ethnically Hoa. He moved to Oregon with his father, Van at a young age. As a young boy, Chau became an altar server at the local Saint Mary Catholic Church, but was reported to have problematic behavior at school. Between August and November 1975, he lived at the Marine Corps Base Camp Pendleton, before a group from Port Arthur, Texas sponsored the father and son to move to the state. At age 14, the two moved to Woodburn, Oregon and attended the local highschool, where Chau was reportedly enjoying himself. However, at one point, in a supposed suicide attempt, he overdosed on aspirin, but survived. In 1985, Chau and Van got into a fight that resulted in the young man being beaten with a piece of wood. He then moved to live with his aunt and cousin in California, where he briefly worked for a company before joining the Marine Corps, serving in Okinawa, Japan.

In 1990, Ho applied for an honorable discharge, and was sent back to Oregon, where he applied for a job as a security dispatcher for the Paragon Cable company. During this time, he legally changed his name to Sebastian Alexander Shaw.

== Murders ==
=== Jay Rickbeil ===
On July 1, 1991, the body of 40-year-old Jay Andrew Rickbeil, a quadraplegic suffering from cerebral palsy, was found in his Portland home by his roommate and apartment manager Mac MacCartney. He had bled to death as a result of an injury to the neck, likely inflicted with a knife. According to his neighbors, Rickbeil was a New Age believer who would often invite strangers into his apartment to have discussions, and often attempted to convert the visitor to his religion. A trusting man, he would often give them a business card with his name and address, and occasionally even money, which often resulted in his personal possessions being stolen. At that time, Shaw had just been fired from his job at Paragon Cable, following complaints of sexual assault by his colleague Shirley Phillips. In order to vent out his anger, he picked Rickbeil at random, slashing his throat while the man lay in bed.

=== Donna Ferguson and Todd Rudiger ===
On July 20, 1992, a couple were found murdered in their trailer home by their fathers in Portland. Todd A. Rudiger, 29, and his live-in girlfriend Donna G. Ferguson, 18, were both stabbed in the necks and bled to death, with Donna having been bound and raped beforehand.

=== Jenny Lin (suspected) ===
On May 27, 1994, after returning home from work, John Lin found the partially naked body of his 14-year-old daughter Jenny in the bathroom of the family's home in the Palomares Hills neighborhood, in Castro Valley, California. She had been stabbed multiple times, but, peculiarly, there were no signs of a struggle, of any apparent sexual assault or any items missing from the house, which puzzled the investigators. She had no known enemies, was a straight A-student and gifted violinist who was about to graduate the following month. According to her friends, when they last spoke to her via phone around 5:15 p.m., Jenny said that she was fine and that she was currently at home. Authorities believed that Jenny's killer was a man, as she had been easily overpowered, and that they did not know each other. They announced that they were looking for a young man on a motorcycle who was seen handing out leaflets in the area, as they wanted to question him as a potential witness.

John Lin later recalled that two weeks before his daughter's death, he had been stopped at a parking lot by a disheveled man who claimed to have "got his daughter", but, knowing that Jenny was at her violin lessons, he brushed the man off and left. Although this bizarre individual was not considered a suspect, a sketch of him was released to the press in an attempt to identify and then interrogate him. In the meantime, the Lin family created "Friends of Jenny Lin", a volunteer organization aimed at spreading awareness about their daughter's case, a move backed by the executive director of the Adam Walsh Center and the father of Polly Klaas. In October, a neighbor came forward to police, claiming that they had seen a stocky man in a dark jacket and cap outside the Lin residence near the time of the murder, claiming that they had been afraid to come forward out of fear that the killer might return to exact revenge on the informants.

== Arrest, trial, imprisonment ==
On August 31, 1994, Sebastian Shaw was arrested for burglary, after he was found asleep in a stolen 1978 Pontiac Bonneville in San Ramon. Among the items confiscated were a so-called "murder kit", consisting of ski mask, surgical gloves, duct tape, knives, binoculars, and plastic handcuffs. As there was no evidence linking him to any murders at the time, he was let go. On February 20, 1998, he was arrested again and charged with the Rudiger/Ferguson murders and the 1995 rape of 18-year-old Amanda Carpova in Portland. His DNA was matched to the crime scenes after police obtained a discarded cigarette he had thrown out at a supermarket.

He pled guilty to the double murder and sexual assault of Carpova, but, in a rare decision, the judge acquitted Shaw of the Rickbeil murder before the trial on behest of the prosecutors. Shaw was sentenced to two terms of life imprisonment instead. While in jail, he told a fellow inmate that he had killed a total of 13 people, information which was relayed to investigators. When two detectives came to interview him, Shaw said that his confession was truthful, and that he would name the victims if he was transferred to a federal prison where he could smoke, as smoking was prohibited in Oregon prisons. Two years later, he was convicted of Rickbeil's murder and received another term of life imprisonment. That same year, he was officially announced as the prime suspect in the murder of Jenny Lin, but was not charged, as there was no physical evidence linking him to the murder. Prosecutors attempted to put him on trial the following year, but the charges were dropped. Lin's murder officially remains unsolved.

== Death ==
Shaw died in prison, aged 53, from undisclosed causes, on October 4, 2021, having served 15 years of his sentence.

== See also ==
- List of serial killers in the United States
- Murder of Adam Walsh
- Murder of Polly Klaas

== Bibliography ==
- Robert Scott (May 1, 2009). Lust To Kill. Pinnacle Books. ISBN 9780786026593.
- Michael Newton (2009). The Encyclopedia of Unsolved Crimes. Infobase Publishing. ISBN 9781438119144.
