= Oregon Museum Tavern shooting =

1981 mass shooting in Salem, Oregon, U.S.

- Location: Salem, Oregon, U.S.
- Date: May 7, 1981; 10:30 p.m.
- Target: Oregon Museum Tavern
- Attack type: Mass murder, shooting spree, mass shooting
- Weapon: 9mm Browning HP handgun
- Deaths: 5 (including 1 who died in 2013)
- Injuries: 18
- Perpetrator: Lawrence William Moore

The Oregon Museum Tavern shooting occurred on May 7, 1981, at the Oregon Museum Tavern in Salem, Oregon, United States.

== Incident ==
At the time of the incident, Lawrence William Moore (born October 1955) was a 25-year-old unemployed mill worker from Scio, Oregon. On May 7, 1981, at 10:30 pm, Moore walked into the crowded Oregon Museum Tavern on Front Street NE during a ladies' night event. Without saying a word, he began to fire his 9mm Browning handgun. Moore first fired at the bar, before turning the weapon at patrons who began to flee.

Throughout the shooting, he spent multiple magazines. While reloading, a bar patron began hitting him with a pool cue and he was overpowered and pinned to the ground by several of the patrons. He was held down until the police arrived.

3 people died on-site and 20 were wounded; one of whom died at the hospital later that night. Dennis Scharf eventually succumbed to his injuries nearly 32 years later. In the end, a total of 5 people lost their lives and 18 were injured.

== Perpetrator ==
Lawrence William Moore

Moore was described by neighbors as a typical country boy. He enjoyed shooting guns and often practiced shooting targets at home, he was polite and a hard worker. He was regularly seen walking around the neighborhood with his golden retriever, Thaddeus. Neighbors and coworkers recall him being shy and an on-time worker. Former classmates painted a different picture of Moore, though. They described him as appearing 'disturbed' and aloof. They said he became more reclusive as more time after high school passed. When they would see him in public and try to speak with him, he would walk away without saying a word in the middle of the conversation.

== Fatalities ==
- Lori Jean Cunningham, 22 – died at the scene
  - She was a paralegal for a local law firm
- John William Cooper, 27 – died at the scene
  - He was a partner in his family’s tool grinding business and McNary graduate
- Robert Eric Hamblin, 24 – died at the scene
  - He was a self-employed auto body painter and Silverton High School graduate.
- Allen Laroy Wilcox, 24 – died at hospital
  - He worked at a local auto parts store and was a McNary graduate.
- Dennis Dean Scharf, 68 – died January 19, 2013, due to complications from injuries sustained

== Legal and aftermath ==
At trial, beginning on October 6, 1981, he pleaded innocent to the murder charges, citing mental disease or defect as a defense; however, he admitted to being the gunman. Moore stated the reason for the shooting that he was trying to apprehend members of a 'syndicate' of millionaires, Jews and criminals who had been trying to poison him.

Moore was subsequently found guilty of four counts of aggravated murder and sentenced to four life terms in prison. As of December 2024, Moore remains incarcerated in the Oregon State Penitentiary, in Salem, Oregon, according to the Oregon Department of Corrections.

=== Memorial ===
The names of the deceased victims are included in a joint memorial wall at Oregon City's Mountain View Cemetery that memorializes some 390 people that were murdered. The memorial was dedicated by The Greater Portland Area chapter of Parents of Murdered Children.

== See also ==
- List of homicides in Oregon
- List of massacres in the United States
- List of rampage killers in the United States
