= Homer Jackson =

American serial killer and rapist (1959-2023)

- Born: Homer Lee Jackson III; December 18, 1959; Berkeley, California, U.S.
- Died: July 18, 2023 (aged 63); Portland, Oregon, U.S.
- Conviction: Negligent homicide (4 counts)
- Penalty: 6 years and 3 months with time served

Details
- Victims: 4+
- Span of crimes: 1983–1993
- Country: United States
- State: Oregon
- Date apprehended: October 15, 2015

Homer Lee Jackson III (December 18, 1959 – July 18, 2023) was an American serial killer and rapist who sexually assaulted and murdered at least three women and one teenage girl, all of whom were prostitutes, in Portland, Oregon from 1983 to 1993. The killings remained unsolved until forensic evidence led to his arrest in 2015.

Jackson's arrest, mental status, and murder trial have been the subject of controversy, culminating with a plea deal that let him off with time served, which was greatly criticized by the family members of his victims.

Jackson was found deceased at his home on July 18, 2023.

== Early life ==
Homer Lee Jackson III was born on December 18, 1959, in Berkeley, California. Little is known about his early life, but in the early 1970s, his family moved to Portland, Oregon, where Jackson would remain for the rest of his life. Early on in childhood, he suffered from a variety of health issues, including congestive heart failure, as well as anterograde amnesia. The latter greatly affected his ability to learn, leading to Jackson dropping out of school after the 10th grade.

From 1978 to 1983, Jackson was repeatedly arrested for burglary, but each time got off with minor prison sentences. By the early 1980s, he began to spend a lot of time in the company of pimps and prostitutes where, by his own admission, he developed an addiction to alcohol and crack cocaine. In the mid-1980s, he suffered a gunshot wound during a fight, for which he had to undergo a surgery that removed one of his lungs. After this incident, Jackson waned off his addiction, ceased his criminal activities and married twice. For the next few years, he was worked in low-skilled labor and did odd jobs, after which he worked for Life Center, a charity that provided food and clothing to the homeless and needy, which had been organized by his grandmother.

In the early 2000s, Jackson divorced his second wife and moved into an apartment in North Portland, where he gradually become very secluded but was still well-regarded by friends and neighbors. A few years later, however, his mental condition began to rapidly deteriorate, and by 2006, he was arrested twice on DUI and reckless driving charges. Later that year, he fired a rifle into the street through his apartment balcony door and then called the police, claiming to the officers that an intruder had attempted to burglarize his apartment via climbing up the balcony - an inspection of the premises revealed nothing that could substantiate his claims.

By the following year, Jackson had made several dozen calls to the local police department, claiming that burglars had attempted to enter his apartment and forced him to fire upon them. After police arrived, he refused to let them inside and threatened to beat them with a stick. This prompted the officers to enter the apartment and subdue him by force, all the while Jackson threatened to shoot them. Due to his erratic behavior, he was ordered to undergo a psychiatric evaluation, which concluded that he was unfit to stand trial and instead should be treated at a mental health facility. After a 4-year treatment, Jackson was released, but with another evaluation diagnosing him with paranoid schizophrenia. From 2011 to 2015, Jackson did not work, lived with relatives, and lived on a monthly SSI disability check allowance of $759. During this period, he experienced problems with insomnia, took medication for depression, suffered from bouts of hypertension, and had difficulty walking.

== Аrrest and interrogations ==
On October 15, 2015, thanks to forensic evidence collected over the years, Jackson was arrested and charged with four murders committed in the Portland area from 1983 to 1987. These were the following: 23-year-old Essie Carrie Jackson (no relation), found on the west edge of Overlook Park in North Portland on March 23, 1983; 19-year-old Tonja Nannette Harry, found on July 9, 1983, in West Delta Park; 14-year-old Angela Dina Anderson, whose body was found in a room of a vacant house on September 22, 1983; and 29-year-old Latanga Lee Watts, whose body was found in some grass near a pedestrian bridge on March 18, 1987. All those killed were prostitutes and each was sexually assaulted and strangled. A peculiar similarity was that all four victims had their breasts exposed and their pants were either unzipped, unbuttoned or pulled down. Shortly after his arrest, his lawyer entered a not guilty plea on his behalf.

Immediately after his arrest, Jackson was taken in for questioning, lasting from 10 AM to 6 PM, and from approximately 8:30 AM to 10:30 AM on the next day. During the first interrogation, he gave contradictory testimony, which was recorded both on tape and video. In it, he claimed that he was not guilty, but suggested that it was possible he could have murdered someone as, at that time, he had a severe drug addiction which, coupled with his amnesia, led him to blank out in his states of rage. Later on, however, under pressure from investigators, Jackson changed his testimony, forcibly admitting that he regularly used services from prostitutes in the early 1980s and describing how the incidents had occurred. He continued to deny culpability, claiming that the reason his seminal fluid was discovered on the bodies was due to the fact he had had consensual sex with the women.

During the interrogations, the police went beyond standard procedures and began to subject him to moral pressure, without obtaining confessions from him. The way they did this was to have two detectives convince him that if he admitted to the killings, his mental condition would stabilize, utilizing his deep religious beliefs to make him "atone for his sins". During the first three hours of questioning, Jackson denied any involvement, but after he was promised a number of privileges and legal advice, he finally began to confess. He identified one of the victims, Angela Anderson, and recounted some details regarding her murder, but later gave testimony which was considered questionable as to its veracity. He claimed that he still had special feelings for the girl, but could not recall the circumstances of her murder and claimed that he had stabbed her in the chest, which was untrue.

When it came to the other murders, Jackson claimed he could not remember any details, although he freely admitted to being familiar with the area where the bodies were discovered. Detectives described various scenarios of how they thought the crimes might have occurred, but Jackson himself expressed doubt about their conclusions. On the next day, at the follow-up interrogation, he confessed to killing Essie Jackson after he was shown photographs taken at the crime scene, but could not recall how he had killed her.

=== Investigation ===
After his arrest, Jackson was held at the Multnomah County Inverness Jail. In April 2016, the Multnomah County District Attorney's Office completed the criminal case and sent it for review, but upon reviewing it, the defense attorney filed a motion to dismiss the case, demanding that their client be tried separately for each murder, as they considered the evidence presented to be circumstantial and questionable at best. For example, epithelium particles found under Essie Jackson's fingernails were examined, with the results showing that the DNA found on them did not match Homer Jackson. A bloodstain found on her jeans also did not match his blood, leaving the confession as the only viable evidence, which was questioned due to Jackson's amnesia.

Another of the victims, Tonja Harry, was found partially submerged face down in a pond, exhibiting several lacerations and fresh IV marks on her arms, bruises on her face and strangulation marks around her neck. The police also found paper towels with traces of semen and hairs on the victims' body that, according to the investigators, belonged to her killer. The forensic examination determined that the traces of bodily fluids did not belong to Jackson, whilst an examination of epithelium particles from a torn trouser belt had inconclusive results, but with a high probability that it indeed belonged to Jackson. Also found near the victim's body were several cigarette butts with traces of saliva, from which DNA was isolated; upon testing it, the DNA's genotypic profile did not match that of Jackson.

Yet another one of the victims, Angela Anderson, had stab wounds on her wrists, and the rope with which she had been strangled was wrapped around her neck. During the investigation, police found cigarette butts with saliva and a fingerprint on one of the rooms' doors, which were later examined. The results concluded that while the cigarette butts were indeed left by Jackson, the forensic analysis concluded that the epithelium particles left by Anderson's killer did not match him.

As for the final victim, Latanga Watts, blood and epithelium particles were also found on her body, but a forensic exam from December 1, 2014, showed that scrapings from her left hand fingernail contained a mixture of DNA from two people, one of which was determined to be Jackson. His attorney pointed out that during that same procedure, epithelium particles were also found on her scarf, which, upon examination, were revealed to belong to five different men, but again, none matched Jackson. Likewise, blood and epithelium particles showed similar results, again finding the DNA of three men, but Jackson was not among them.

=== Overturning of confession and new charges ===
After reviewing a motion by Jackson's attorneys, the court ruled in October 2017 that his confession was invalid because of Portland police coercion tactics during the initial interrogation. Judge Michael A. Greenlick said the inducements and threats from the investigators created a risk of inaccurate testimony and a potential miscarriage of justice, prompting an objection from the District Attorney's Office, who claimed that no such thing had occurred. They subsequently appealed the ruling to the Oregon Supreme Court, but in November 2018, it upheld the lower court's decision. In its decision, the Supreme Court justices stated that Jackson's schizophrenia, severe memory problems and the fact that he provided inaccurate testimony indicated that he was susceptible to suggestibility. Due to this, his upcoming trial was postponed until the spring of 2019.

In May 2019, the start of the trial was postponed indefinitely after prosecutors dropped one of the murder charges, that of Essie Jackson, against the defendant. They instead charged with another murder, that of 29-year-old Lawauna Janelle Triplet, whose body was found in a neighborhood in North Portland on June 15, 1993. She had been beaten and strangled to death, and like most of Jackson's other suspected victims, she was a prostitute. Due to this new charge, his trial date was moved back to January 2020.

In early 2020, Jackson's attorneys filed a motion for him to be tried separately in four trials. The motion was granted, prompting an objection from the prosecutor's office. In his ruling, Judge Greenlick noted that despite similarities in the murders, it was impossible to conclusively determine that they were the work of a singular individual, citing the insufficient evidence of Jackson's possible involvement. Judge Greenlick made the decision after conducting numerous hearings and reviewing more than 1,400 pages of case files, arguing in his decision that there were way too many substantial differences in the murders: that one victim was a teenager and another was an adult; that each sustained different types of injuries from different weapons; that two of the bodies were found in the same location six years apart, and that virtually all of them were killed across the city. He also concluded that evidence from each respective case could not be used outside of its respective trial.

At that time, Jackson's attorneys filed a motion for their client to be placed under house arrest at his mother's home, as they feared he might contract COVID-19 due to his physical ailments, as he had already spent several days in an ICU with a high fever. He was subsequently diagnosed with pneumonia, but the defense motion was denied.

The District Attorney's Office, dissatisfied with Judge Greenlick's decision, appealed the ruling to the Oregon Supreme Court, leading to an indefinite postponement of his trial date. In November 2021, the Supreme Court rejected the appeal, after which a trial date was set for March 2022.

== Trial and release ==
Jackson's trial began in January 2022. Because there was a high probability he would be acquitted of most of the murders, but found guilty on at least one murder charge, the Multnomah County Prosecutor's Office offered him a plea deal, which Jackson accepted. As per the deal's terms, Jackson pleaded guilty to the criminally negligent homicides of Harry, Anderson, Watts and Triplet. He was sentenced to 6 years and 3 months imprisonment on January 31, 2022, and was released with time served. The decision took into account his mental illness, health issues, low credibility of his confession and the statute of limitations on the crimes. The verdict was heavily criticized by the victims' family members, who said that Jackson should have received a harsher punishment for his crimes.

== Death ==
Jackson was found deceased at his home by his sister on July 18, 2023. At the time, he weighed under 80lbs, and had recently returned home from being hospitalized for cardio-pulmonary issues. No cause of death has been released, but police do not suspect foul play.

== See also ==
- List of serial killers in the United States
