= Oregon State Penitentiary =

Prison in Salem, Oregon, U.S.

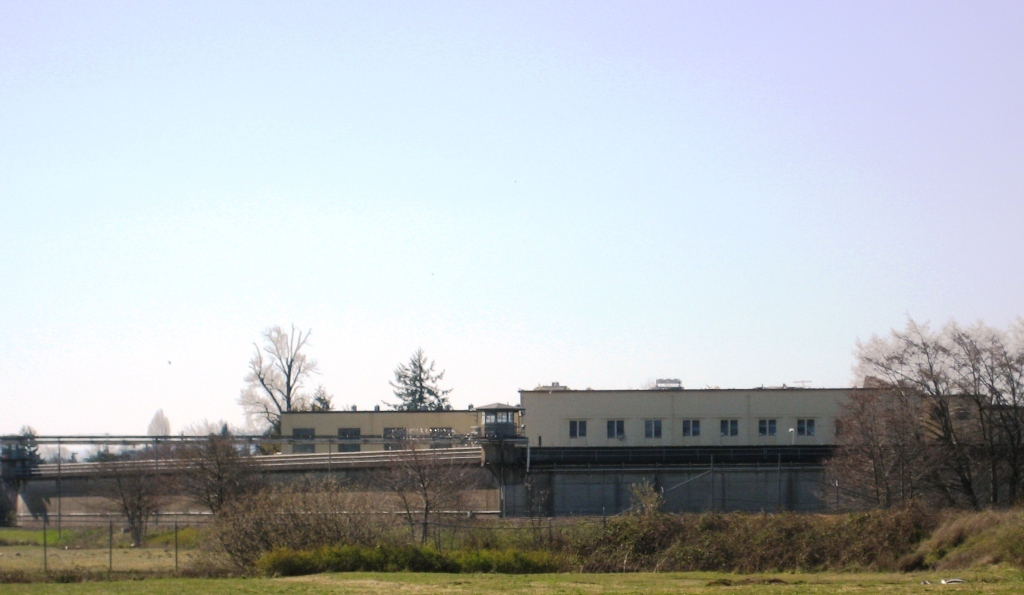
- OSP in April 2008

- Location in the United States Location in Oregon
- Location: Salem, Oregon; 44.932°N 123.005°W
- Status: Operational
- Security class: maximum, male
- Capacity: 2,194
- Opened: Salem: 1866; 160 years ago Portland: 1851–1866
- Managed by: Oregon Department of Corrections (ODOC)
- Warden: Tim Thrasher
- Website: www.oregon.gov/DOC/OPS/PRISON/Pages/osp.aspx

Oregon State Penitentiary (OSP), also known as Oregon State Prison, is a maximum security prison in the northwestern United States in Salem, Oregon. Originally opened in Portland 175 years ago in 1851, it relocated to Salem fifteen years later. The 2,242-capacity prison is the oldest in the state; the all-male facility is operated by the Oregon Department of Corrections (ODOC). OSP contains an intensive management wing, which is being transformed into a psychiatric facility for mentally ill prisoners throughout Oregon.

== History ==
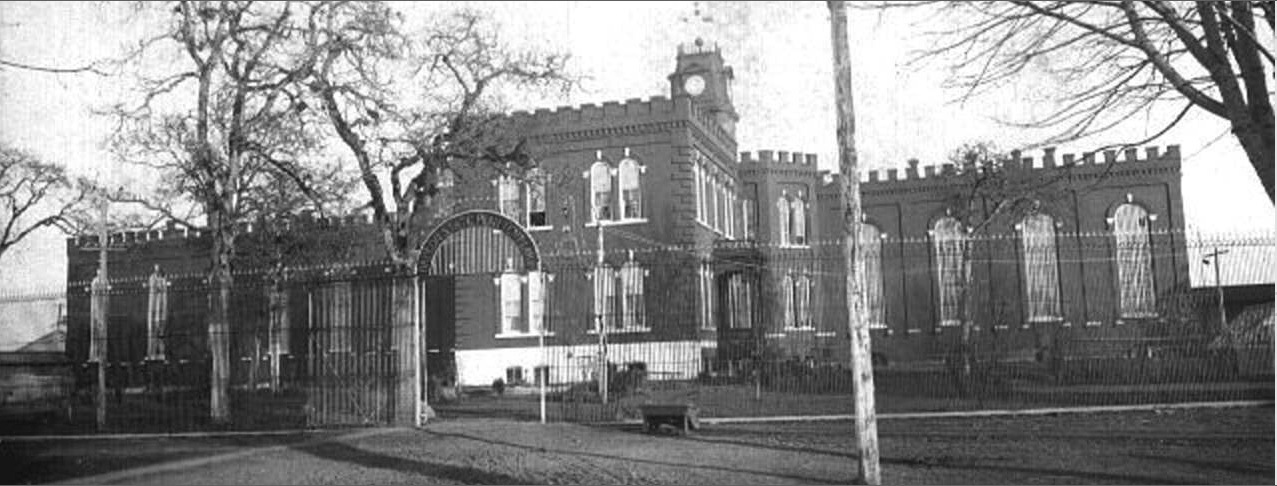
Oregon State Penitentiary in 1892

Prior to the construction of prisons in Oregon, many convicted of crimes were either hanged or pardoned. Oregon State Penitentiary was originally built in Portland in 1851. Operating this facility proved difficult because it spanned two blocks, with a city street running through the middle. In 1859, the facility was leased to private contractors (Robert Newell and L. N. English), who instituted a system of prison labor. This new system led to many escapes.

In 1866, the state officially moved the penitentiary to a 26-acre (11 ha) site in Salem, enclosed by a reinforced concrete wall averaging fourteen feet (4.3 m) in height. The prison also began using a device called the "Gardner shackle" (later called the "Oregon Boot"), a heavy metal device attached to prisoners' legs to impede movement.

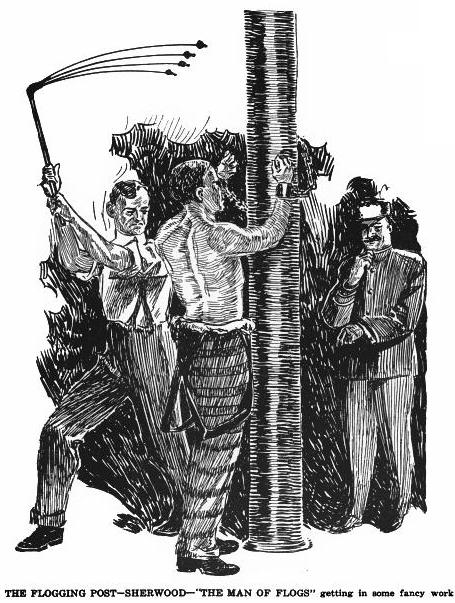
Bunko Kelly describes prison guards flogging several people to death, including a disabled African American named Monroe.

Oregon State Penitentiary in the 1920s

Escapes continued at the new facility, despite the wall and the Boot. The most famous of these occurred in 1902, when Harry Tracy and David Merrill killed three guards with a gun. Details about this period can be read in Thirteen Years in Oregon State Penitentiary, a book written by Joseph "Bunko" Kelly. Kelly describes scenes of extreme brutality, particularly floggings, which he recounts happening to white people, black people, Native Americans, and a Chinese "half boy and half woman". He describes negligent doctors and a lack of mental health care, and complains that whiskey drinking affects the behavior of the guards. He also identifies a five-year period in which the warden stopped newspaper deliveries to prevent convicts from learning of pardons. The prison announced in 1904 that it would end the use of flogging, and instead punish prisoners by spraying them with cold water from a garden hose.

The prison experimented briefly in 1917–1918 with an "honor system" in which 130 prisoners were paroled with certain conditions. The prisoners were released into jobs outside the prison during the daytime. After 66 of these absconded, Governor James Withycombe announced that he would find a way for them to work jobs within the prison facility.

In the 1920s, the Penitentiary created a flax plant which employed more than half of its inmates. Inmates worked on construction and in the fields, and were paid $0.50–$1.00 per day. The plant was touted nationally as a way to make the prison financially self-sustaining, and to rehabilitate prisoners by giving them something to do and preparing them to work. In 1925, OSP had the largest flax scutching mill in the world, with 175 workers producing 100–150 tons of flax per day.

With assistance from the Federal Bureau of Education, OSP ran a unique and successful adult education program during the same era. With Prohibition in effect, 80 of the prison's 575 inmates at this time were moonshiners. Nine prisoners were shot in a 1926 riot beginning in the prison cafeteria.

Seven hundred inmates were involved in a riot on August 1, 1936, in response to a court ruling that made it more difficult for prisoners to be released after serving their minimum sentence. The riot was put down by armed guards; one prisoner, Thomas Baughn, was killed and two more were wounded. After being deprived of their weapons (and of food, in punishment), prisoners began to break windows and throw projectiles from their cells. Inmates at OSP attempted a mass escape in December 1951, after receiving weapons from a sympathetic guard. The plan was foiled by an informant, John Edward Ralph, who was quickly transferred to Folsom Prison for his own protection. Unrest continued through 1952 with civil disobedience and more escape attempts. Over 1300 prisoners conducted an eight-day hunger strike in August to protest alleged brutality of a guard named Morris Race. In October 1952, an escape attempt involving armed conflict with guards was suppressed with gunfire. On January 1, 1953, prison officials announced the discovery of an escape tunnel being dug by prisoner Robert Green. The tunnel was 12 feet underground and 50 feet long, reaching within 15 feet of the world outside OSP walls.

A major insurrection erupted in July 1953 when prisoners stopped working, on strike for better food and medical care. They barricaded themselves in the cafeteria. Under instructions from Warden Clarence T. Gladden, guards used tear gas to prevent the prisoners from reaching food supplies. The angry prisoners gained control of most of the prison and started fires in the flax plant, laundry room, tailor room, and machine shop. Ultimately the prisoners were subdued by guards with tear gas, shotguns, and rifles. 1100 Rebels were confined to a baseball diamond without food or water, with Warden Gladden saying they would stay there until "I am sure they are repentant". They stayed on the diamond for two days and one night, until twenty ringleaders identified by prison authorities were surrendered, and prisoners agreed to be individually searched.

In what may have been the first sex reassignment surgery officially conducted in a prison, a DMAB prisoner changed her sex to female, through surgery and hormones, in a period prior to release in 1965.

Discontent continued in the 1960s. The public became aware that only 200 of the 1200 inmates at OSP actually had sentences calling for maximum security incarceration; yet all inmates were treated according to maximum security standards. Prisoners continued to complain about medical care, dental care, and visitation rights.

Unrest culminated in March 1968, in an uprising which began with a surprise takeover of the prison's control center. 700 prisoners took control of the facility, started a fire in the flour shop, and held 40 guards and prison employees hostage. The hostages were freed after prison officials announced the resignation of Warden Gladden (then 73 years old), as well as immunity for the rioters. Prisoners were criticized for damaging facilities that supported them. Ron Schmidt, press secretary of Governor Tom McCall, said: "It's pure devastation. The men destroyed everything that was of any benefit to them." Two inmates were stabbed during the riot: Delmar DuBray, 30, was stabbed in the right kidney; Melvin Newell, 36, was stabbed in the abdomen and groin.

In November 1968, a work stoppage by 81 prisoners in the laundry room was controlled by guards with clubs, and the prisoners placed in isolation.

Also in 1968, OSP inmates founded UHURU (now Uhuru Sasa), an organization dedicated to Afro-American culture, history, and community service. Although the prison establishment was skeptical at first, UHURU gained official support and had a membership of several hundred in 1982. OSP prisoners were politically active in the following decades, holding forums on politics and communicating with the Oregon NAACP. OSP began to recruit African American staff in 1981 in response to pressure from activist black prisoners.

In September 1988, 28 female inmates at the Oregon Correctional Center staged a sit-down protest that prison Superintendent Robert H. Scheidler described as the first of its kind in the facility's history. On October 1, between four and eight women staged a hunger strike – inmate Jody Bedell fasted for 24 days before ending the strike. Both the sit-down protest and hunger strike were meant to call attention to overcrowding, poor medical care, inadequate education programs and the shortage of showers and laundry machines. At the time, the prison was built for 80 women but was housing over 140 women and had only one shower for every 43 inmates. The women who participated in the hunger strike were ordered to spend a year in a segregation unit and were fined $214.

In May 2020, ODOC announced that the state will close its death row. On December 13, 2022, Governor Kate Brown commuted the death sentences of everyone on Oregon's death row to life without parole. She also instructed the Department of Corrections to dismantle the state's death chamber.

Starting in 2020, members of Uhuru Sasa were involved in a project called OASIS, which culminated in the passing of Oregon Ballot Measure 112 in the 2022 election. In 2021, Governor Kate Brown pardoned Uhuru Sasa president Anthony Pickens, who was a key player from the beginning of the project.

== Facility and programs ==
The prison is located on 194 acres (79 hectares) of land in the southeast of Salem, Oregon. The facility itself consists of ten acres (4 hectares), surrounded by a 25-foot (7.5-meter) wall which is patrolled by armed correctional officers.

Most housing in the penitentiary is in large cell blocks with most inmates housed in single man cells that have been converted to double man cells to increase capacity. The penitentiary also has a full service infirmary.

=== Intensive Management Unit ===
Oregon State Penitentiary was the site of Oregon's first supermax unit, the "Intensive Management Unit" (IMU), constructed in 1991. The 196-bed self-contained Intensive Management Unit provides housing and control for male inmates who disrupt or pose a substantial threat to the general population in all department facilities. In 2006, this facility held 147 people (out of a total of 784 across Oregon) in solitary confinement.

Conditions in the IMU were the object of public criticism, triggered particularly by multiple suicide of mentally ill prisoners. Former warden Brian Belleque also expressed doubts about the possibility of rehabilitation in the IMU, saying: "We realize that 95 to 98 percent of these inmates here are going to be your neighbor in the community. They are going to get out." Prisoners in the OSP IMU were moved in 2009 to Snake River Correctional Institution in Ontario, Oregon.

In 2010, ODOC began to convert the IMU into a psychiatric facility, which will serve mentally ill prisoners from across Oregon. Some advocates for the mentally ill have argued that the IMU facility is not suitable for treating the mentally ill because it is "dark" and "crowded", and generally designed for solitary confinement.

=== Death row ===
OSP was the site of death row in Oregon and contained the lethal injection chamber where prisoners were executed. Governor John Kitzhaber announced an official moratorium on executions in November 2011. In May 2020, ODOC announced that the state would close its death row. On December 13, 2022, Governor Kate Brown commuted the death sentences of everyone on Oregon's death row to life without parole and instructed the Department of Corrections to dismantle the state's death chamber.

Executions in Oregon were conducted in public by counties until 1902, when they were centralized (and made less spectacular) at the State Penitentiary. Since the US Supreme Court reaffirmed the death penalty in Gregg v. Georgia (1976), Oregon has managed to execute only two people: Douglas Franklin Wright, in 1996, and Harry Charles Moore, in 1997.

=== Hospice ===
Oregon State Penitentiary is home to a hospice, which is staffed by volunteers from among the prison population. The current incarnation of the hospice began in 1999, and won "Program of the Year Award" from the National Commission on Correctional Health Care in 2001. The OSP hospice was at the forefront of a national trend of prison hospices – reacting to increased prison deaths resulting from the HIV/AIDS epidemic and from harsher sentencing laws. The program's volunteer-based structure has served as a model for other institutions.

=== Minimum security annex ===
Oregon State Penitentiary has a separate minimum security facility located on its grounds. It was first opened in 1964 as Oregon's first women's prison, and was called Oregon Women's Correctional Center. In 2010, the state closed the minimum security annex.

=== Work and education programs ===
Inmates may voluntarily participate in work or education programs, and OSP has a variety of programs designed to reduce recidivism and help inmates secure jobs after they are released.

Chemeketa Community College provides Adult Basic Education, GED, (Note: Inmate tutors teach the GED classes, with supervision from Education Coordinators from Chemeketa.) and English as a Second Language courses at OSP. They also offer classes on automotive technology and art, allowing inmates to earn credits toward a certificate or associate's degree.

Inmates at OSP produce Braille textbooks, and launder hospital linens.

== Criticism and legal actions ==
Prisoners and advocates have charged the OSP system with racism, saying that the system discriminates against black inmates – both by placing them in worse conditions and by failing to protect them from racially motivated violence. They cite the case of Pete Wilson, a black prisoner who was stabbed by ten white inmates while white guards looked on. Black inmates also charged the OSP library with showing racial bias in access and employment. One black inmate described their opinion on the causes and effects of this bias:

Black and other minorities at OSP have an acute problem with the librarian when it comes to their gaining access to courts. First we recognize racism is an ingrained traditional attitude. And second, prisons are reflections of those views. Therefore, Blacks and others in their own wherewithal struggle towards the path of freedom through redress in our courts. But quite often the librarian tries to preclude these efforts in many different ways. Such as telling prisoners his notary seal is broken and of course this tactic will go on for two or three weeks until one of the counselors puts a stop to it, being that if the librarian doesn't notarize documents they will have to do his job.

Prisoners have accused OSP guards of homophobia, censoring homosexual materials in the men's prison and contact among inmates in the women's prison (closed in 2010). In 1982, prisoners filed a class-action lawsuit against the prison, charging that their rights to receive mail were being violated. In particular, they charged prison officials with censoring the mail by withholding "not approved" material, including material related to homosexuality. District Judge Owen Panner decided for the prisoners and the ACLU, ruling that blacklisting certain publications and materials (including those related to homosexuality) violated the First and Fourteenth Amendment rights of the prisoners. However, some advocates believed that the legal ruling would have little effect. Carole Pope, a former prisoner at OSP, said: "We've had five major law suits. After each one, there was a token change, then it went back to the way it was. They [prison officials] don't take any of this seriously."

In 1977, three inmates (two current and one former) filed a lawsuit alleging that they had been harmed by medical experiments using drugs and radiation. The experiments were voluntary and affected 67 prisoners, who were paid $125 each.

== In popular culture ==
Oregon State Prison appears in the opening scene of the 2001 film Bandits, during an escape scene in which the two protagonists forcibly break out of the prison and then proceed on a bank robbing spree. The "Gardner shackle" (later called the "Oregon Boot") is featured in the March 16, 1960, episode of Wagon Train, "The Alexander Portlass Story", and in the January 27, 1957, episode of Alfred Hitchcock Presents, "The Manacled."

== Notable inmates ==
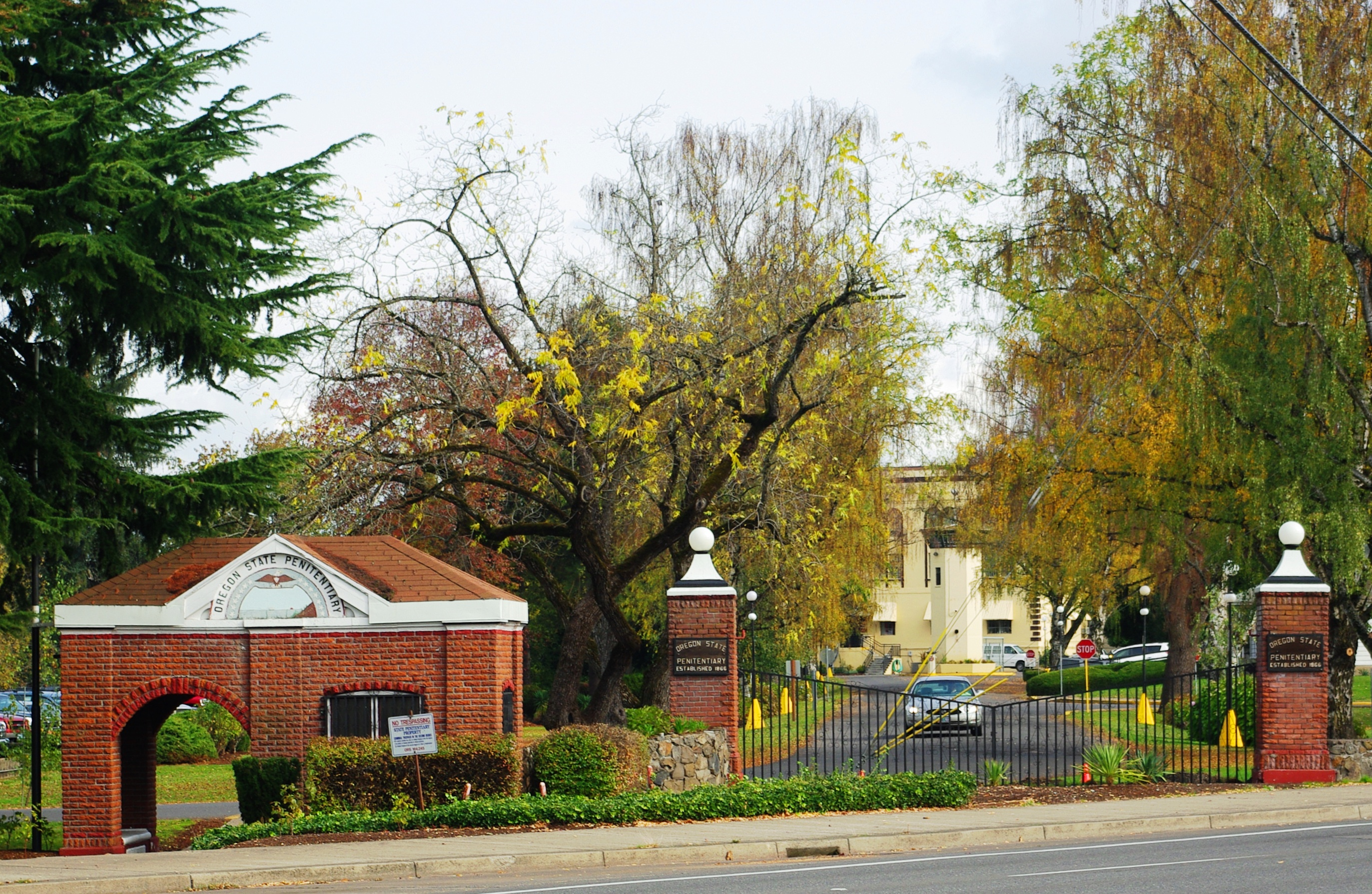
Old formal gates at the prison

List of inmates (with dates of incarceration) at Oregon State Penitentiary:

=== Current inmates ===
- Bradly Morris Cunningham (since 1995) – serving a life sentence for murdering his ex-wife and mother of his three sons Cheryl Keeton.
- Andrew David Edwards – serial killer
- William Perry Jackson – serial killer
- Keith Hunter Jesperson (since 1995) – the "Happy Face Killer"
- Christian Longo (since 2003) – murdered his wife and three children
- Richard Laurence Marquette (1961–1973, since 1975)
- Dayton Leroy Rogers (since 1989) – serial killer linked to the murders of seven women
- Randall Woodfield (since 1981) – "The I-5 Killer"; injured at OSP in 1983; filed suit (unsuccessfully) in 1987 against author Ann Rule for publishing a libelous account of his case

=== Former inmates ===
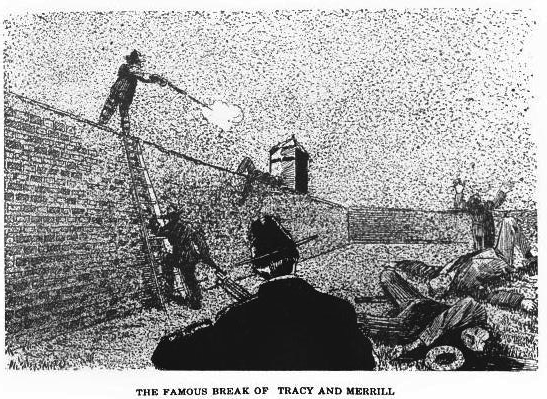
Escape of Tracy & Merrill, depicted in Kelly's 1908 book

- John Arthur Ackroyd – died 2016
- Llewellyn Banks - newspaper publisher and populist leader convicted of murdering policeman; died 1945
- Bobby Beausoleil- Manson family member, transferred to OSP from California in 1994 as per his request. Transferred back to California Medical Facility in 2015.
- Jerry Brudos (1969–2006) – died of liver cancer; OSP's longest-term resident
- Diane Downs – convicted in the 1983 shooting of her three children, transferred to Clinton Correctional Facility for Women after her 1987 escape
- Bobby Jack Fowler (1996–2006) – connected to the Highway of Tears murders, died in prison of lung cancer
- Gary Gilmore (1962, 1964–1972, 1972–1975) – released to halfway house, quickly convicted of new crimes, re-incarcerated, transferred to USP Marion for bad behavior, paroled to Utah in April 1976, committed multiple murders in July 1976, executed in January 1977
- George Hayford (1858–?), attorney and swindler
- Joseph "Bunko" Kelly (fl.1895–1908) – released; author of Thirteen Years In The Oregon Penitentiary
- Randal Krager (1992–1994, 1995–1996) – released, re-arrested, pardoned; founded Volksfront in 1994 while incarcerated
- Harry Charles Moore (1993–1997) – executed by lethal injection
- Carl Panzram (1915–1918) – escaped, assumed a false identity, committed more crimes, captured in 1928 in Washington, D.C., incarcerated at USP Leavenworth and executed there in 1930
- John Omar Pinson (1947–1959) – paroled after six years of good behavior; accused of killing police officer Delmond E. Rondeau and setting fire to the flax plant in 1949; profiled on the television show Gang Busters!
- Sebastian Shaw – Died in October 2021
- Harry Tracy (1901–1902) – escaped, committed suicide when threatened with capture
- Hank Vaughan (1865–1870) – moved with the prison from Portland to Salem, narrowly avoiding a lynch mob; paroled early for good behavior, moved to Nevada, and became a blacksmith

== See also ==
- List of Oregon prisons and jails
- Harry Minto
