= Bandon massacre =

1996 mass murder in Oregon, United States

- Location: 43.0691°N 124.4142°W; Bandon, Coos County, Oregon
- Date: May 9, 1996
- Target: His ex-girlfriend’s family
- Attack type: Mass murder; mass stabbing
- Weapon: 7-inch kitchen knife
- Deaths: 5
- Perpetrator: Girley Crum Jr.
- Motive: Revenge

The Bandon massacre was the murder of five members of the Jacobs family by Girley Crum Jr., who broke into their home in Bandon, Oregon, and slashed their throats while they slept, as an act of revenge against the matriarch of the family, who was his ex-girlfriend.

He was caught and sent to trial. He was found guilty of the murders and sentenced to life imprisonment without the possibility of parole.

The murder of the Jacobses is considered one of the worst mass murders and crimes in Oregon's history. It was also the first murders in Bandon in over 18 years at the time.

== Background ==
On May 9, 1996, in a trailer park in Bandon, Oregon, a man named Ray Jacobs staggered to a neighbor's home asking for help, his throat having been cut. The neighbors tried to tend to his wounds. One of the occupants asked who did this to him, and Jacobs gave a name before he died. The authorities arrived on the scene and went back to Jacobs's trailer, where they found the bodies of four of his family members. They were his wife Kelly Jacobs; his children, Jessica and Christopher Jacobs; and Kelly's brother, Roger Glazebrook of Spokane, Washington. Their throats had been slashed and they had been stabbed to death. Police, using a tracking dog in the woods, found and detained the man Jacobs named: Girley Crum Jr., a man with a violent criminal past.

== Perpetrator ==
Girley Crum Jr.

Girley Crum Jr. was born in 1961 in Arizona to Geraldine and Girley Sr. as one of six children. As a child, he was beaten by his father and bullied at school for his name. He did not graduate high school, but earned a general equivalency degree. He was known to have had a violent criminal history, at one point raping a girl. He got into an altercation with police in 1983 during a traffic stop, where he pulled a knife out and a struggle happened. In 1988, he broke into an acquaintance's apartment armed with a screwdriver. He pleaded guilty to armed robbery. He was released three years later, where he married a woman and took a job as a cook. He was described as having a different side when he drank. It was also said he had dated Kelly a few years back, before she married Ray.

== Legal proceedings ==
Crum was indicted on five counts of aggravated murder and held on a $5,000,000 bail, as a trial date was scheduled for February 3, 1997, with scheduled motions of September 3 and November 22. During his arraignment, he quietly said to his family, “I don’t know what happened.”

== Trial ==
During the trial, the defense said that Kelly was the one who killed her family in an act of despair and that Girley killed her in self-defense, despite one of the victim's dying words implicating Crum. They noted it likely stemmed from her husband and brother sexually abusing Jessica. Other evidence included Kelly driving the family's car into a ditch a day before the murders. The state medical examiner rejected the claim showing the cuts and wounds on the Kelly's body and how it was unlikely she tried to commit suicide by cutting her throat. The prosecution said the murders were committed as an act of revenge against Kelly. This was backed up by testimony by two inmates he was housed with days before the murders. They said he boasted on getting revenge on a woman in Bandon and was going to cut everyones throats in the trailer. The jury deliberated for two hours before coming back a verdict. They found Crum guilty of the murders. During the penalty phase, two juries were unable to agree on the death penalty, so Crum was sentenced to life imprisonment without the possibility of parole. During his sentencing he apologized to the victims family in the court.

== Aftermath ==
It was alleged that two jurors had broken their juror's oath before the sentencing of Crum. The forewoman had talked about the case out of court, as well as talking with another juror and the judge before deliberations began to spare Crum's life. Despite the allegations, the DA wouldn't re-open the case and pursue another death penalty, but instead pursued contempt of court for the juror.

== See also ==
- Christian Longo
