= James Parker McCollough =

American lawyer and politician

Member of the Texas House of Representatives from the 52nd district
- In office January 10, 1989 – January 12, 1993

Personal details
- Born: October 18, 1950 Amarillo, Texas, U.S.
- Died: October 31, 2024 (aged 74)
- Party: Democratic

James Parker McCollough (October 18, 1950 – October 31, 2024) was an American lawyer and Democratic politician who served as a member of the Texas House of Representatives from 1989 to 1993. He represented the 52nd district during the 71st and 72nd Texas Legislatures and chaired the House Committee on Criminal Jurisprudence during the 72nd Legislature.

McCollough also practiced criminal defense law and represented Henry Lee Lucas in the high-profile trial for the murder of the unidentified woman known as "Orange Socks", later identified as Debra Jackson.

== Early life and legal career ==
McCollough was born in Amarillo, Texas, on October 18, 1950. He attended South Plains College before transferring to Texas Tech University, where he earned a bachelor's degree in business and a law degree.

After completing his legal education, McCollough established a law practice in Georgetown, Texas. He also worked as a public defender and served as a municipal judge.

== Political career ==
McCollough entered electoral politics as a Democrat in the 1988 election for the Texas House of Representatives. He challenged Republican incumbent Randall Riley in House District 52. Contemporary coverage in The Texas Observer described McCollough as a Georgetown attorney who had received the endorsement of organized labor.

McCollough defeated Riley in the general election and took office in January 1989. The Texas Observer subsequently identified him as one of the Republican incumbents defeated in the 1988 House elections.

He was reelected in 1990. According to contemporary election coverage, McCollough won 61 percent of the vote in House District 52, defeating Republican Randall Riley.

=== 71st Legislature ===
During the 71st Legislature in 1989, McCollough served on the House Committees on Criminal Jurisprudence and Judicial Affairs and on the Task Force on State and Local Drug Control.

One of his most significant legislative initiatives during his first term was House Bill 3192, concerning economic-development incentives for Texas municipalities. McCollough introduced the bill after officials in Georgetown asked him to develop legislation that would extend to cities powers similar to those being granted to counties under separate legislation.

The bill was introduced on May 8, 1989, near the end of the legislative session. McCollough secured permission to introduce it late in the session and moved it through the legislature in time for it to reach the governor with two days remaining. The legislation became part of the statutory framework for economic-development incentives available to Texas cities under Chapter 380 of the Local Government Code.

In a later account of the legislation, McCollough recalled that the bill and related county legislation passed with little opposition. The economic-development provisions subsequently became an enduring part of the framework used by Texas local governments to offer incentives to businesses.

McCollough was also named one of Texas Monthly's "Rookies of the Year" in the magazine's 1989 assessment of Texas legislators.

=== 72nd Legislature ===
McCollough served in the 72nd Legislature, which convened in 1991. He served on the House Committees on Appropriations, Criminal Jurisprudence, Judicial Affairs and Redistricting, and chaired the Judicial Affairs Subcommittee on Budget and Oversight.

In August 1992, McCollough was appointed chairman of the House Committee on Criminal Jurisprudence. The Legislative Reference Library's committee records cite contemporaneous coverage in the Austin American-Statesman under the headline "Georgetown lawmaker named to committee" and note that McCollough's appointment resulted in his replacement on the Appropriations Committee.

The Criminal Jurisprudence Committee dealt with legislation and oversight concerning criminal law, criminal procedure and related state agencies.

As chairman and as a House sponsor, McCollough was involved in several measures concerning criminal law and procedure. He sponsored Senate Bill 16, concerning the suspension of driver's licenses for people convicted of certain felony offenses and related appropriations. The measure became law in 1991.

He also sponsored Senate Bill 880, concerning sentencing procedures in capital cases, and Senate Bill 883, concerning procedures for bringing an accused person before a magistrate. Both measures became law in 1991.

McCollough also served on the House Committee on Redistricting during the 72nd Legislature.

=== 1992 election ===
McCollough sought reelection in 1992. The Texas Observer identified him as the Democratic incumbent in District 52 and reported that Republican Mike Krusee was challenging him for the seat.

Krusee defeated McCollough in the November 1992 general election. The official election results show Krusee receiving 25,259 votes, or 51.86 percent, to McCollough's 23,443 votes, or 48.14 percent.

== Defense of Henry Lee Lucas ==
McCollough practiced criminal defense law in Central Texas and represented Henry Lee Lucas during the 1984 trial for the murder of the unidentified woman known as "Orange Socks". McCollough and attorney Don Higginbotham represented Lucas in the case.

Contemporary newspaper coverage also identified McCollough as one of Lucas's defense attorneys. Lucas was convicted and sentenced to death in the case, although his broader series of murder confessions subsequently became the subject of extensive investigation and controversy.

In 2013, The Texas Tribune revisited the criminal-justice system of Williamson County and identified McCollough as Lucas's defense lawyer. The article also quoted McCollough discussing former prosecutor Ken Anderson, with whom McCollough had faced each other in court in a number of cases.

The victim in the Orange Socks case was identified in 2019 as Debra Jackson. Lucas's case was later featured in the 2019 documentary miniseries The Confession Killer, in which McCollough appeared as himself and was identified as Lucas's attorney.

== Later career ==
After leaving the Texas House, McCollough continued to practice law and later worked in government and legislative affairs.

His later political experience also led to his participation in discussions of Texas politics and campaign finance. In 2001, The Texas Observer interviewed McCollough as a former state representative and energy lobbyist in connection with reporting on money and political influence in Texas.

== Death and memorial ==
McCollough died on October 31, 2024, at the age of 74.

In 2025, the Texas House of Representatives adopted House Resolution 310 in his memory. The resolution recognized his service as a state representative and his leadership of the House Committee on Criminal Jurisprudence and the Judicial Affairs Subcommittee on Budget and Oversight.

== See also ==
- Henry Lee Lucas
- Murder of Debra Jackson
- Texas House of Representatives
- The Confession Killer
