= Governorship of George W. Bush =

1995–2000 period in Texas

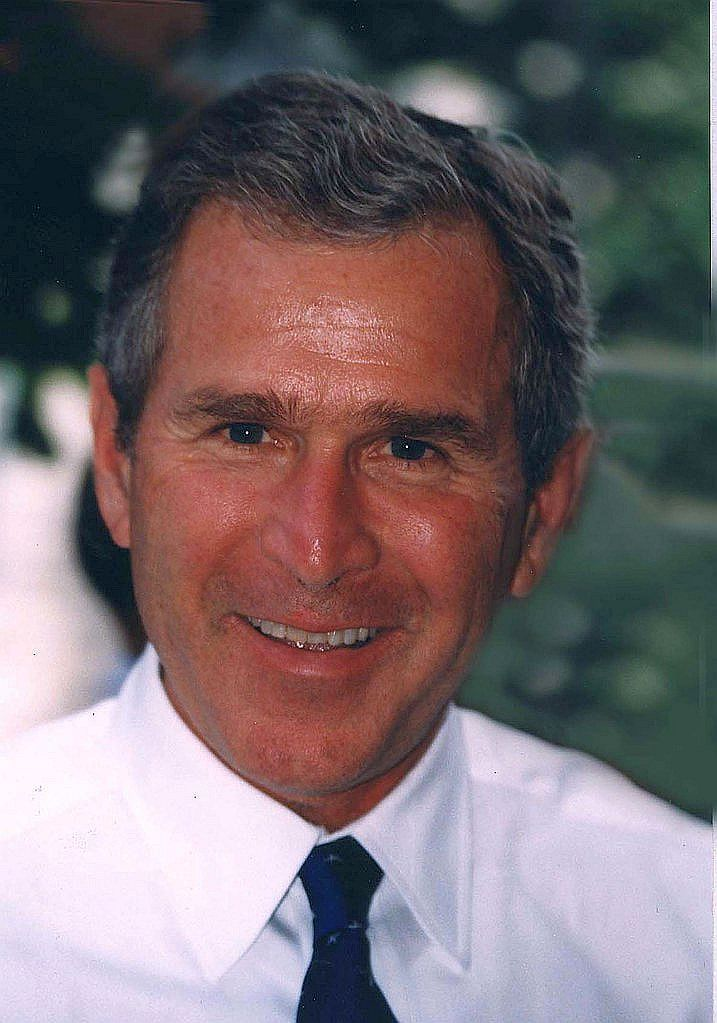
- Official portrait, 1999
- Governorship of George W. Bush; January 17, 1995 – December 21, 2000
- Governor: George W. Bush
- Party: Republican
- Election: 1994; 1998
- Seat: Governor's Mansion
- Seal of Texas

George W. Bush served as the 46th governor of Texas from 1995 until 2000, when he resigned as governor amid his transition into the U.S. presidency after having been elected president in the 2000 United States presidential election. As governor, Bush successfully sponsored legislation for tort reform, increased education funding, set higher standards for schools, and reformed the criminal justice system. Bush also pioneered faith-based welfare programs and helped make Texas the leading producer of wind powered electricity in the U.S. He faced criticism for the high number of executions carried out during his time as governor, and for promoting educational policies which critics argued were ineffective.

== 1994 gubernatorial election ==
With his father George H. W. Bush's election to the United States presidency in 1988, speculation had arisen among Republicans that George W. Bush would enter the 1990 Texas gubernatorial election. This was offset by Bush's purchase of the Texas Rangers baseball team and personal concerns regarding his own record and profile. Bush later declared his candidacy for the 1994 election, the same election cycle that his brother Jeb first sought the governorship of Florida. Winning the Republican primary easily, Bush faced incumbent Governor Ann Richards, a popular Democrat who was considered the easy favorite, given Bush's lack of political credentials.

Results of the 1994 Texas gubernatorial election by county

Bush was aided in his campaign by a close coterie of political advisers that included Karen Hughes, a former journalist who was his communications adviser; Joe Allbaugh, who became his campaign manager, and Karl Rove, a personal friend and political activist who is believed to have been a strong influence in encouraging Bush to enter the election. Bush's aides crafted a campaign strategy that attacked Governor Richards' record on law enforcement, her political appointments, and her support of liberal political causes. Bush developed a positive image and message with themes of "personal responsibility" and "moral leadership." His campaign focused on issues such as education (seeking more accountability for schools over student performance), crime, deregulation of the economy, and tort reform. In the course of the campaign, Bush pledged to sign a bill allowing Texans to obtain permits to carry concealed weapons. Richards had vetoed the bill, but Bush signed it into law after he became governor.

Following an impressive performance in the debates, Bush's popularity grew. He won with 54.1 percent against Richards' 45.9 percent.

== 1998 gubernatorial election ==
As a popular governor, Bush won re-election in a landslide victory with nearly 69 percent of the vote.

He won 49 percent of the Latino vote and 27 percent of the African American vote, becoming the first Texas governor to be elected for two consecutive terms since Dolph Briscoe was re-elected in 1974. Within a year, he had decided to seek the Republican nomination for the Presidency.

== Policies ==
=== Capital punishment ===
Bush presided over 152 executions, more than any previous governor in modern American history; critics such as Helen Prejean argue that he failed to give serious consideration to clemency requests. The only death sentence Bush commuted to life imprisonment was for serial killer Henry Lee Lucas because of lingering doubts about his guilt in the so-called "Orange Socks" (identified in 2019 as Debra Jackson) murder in Georgetown, Texas in 1979.

=== Fiscal ===
Seeking to reduce high property taxes to benefit homeowners while increasing general education funding, Bush sought to create business taxes, but faced vigorous opposition from his own party and the private sector. Failing to obtain political consensus for his proposal, Bush used a budget surplus to push through a $2 billion tax-cut plan, which was the largest in Texas history and cemented Bush's credentials as a pro-business fiscal conservative. To pay for the tax cuts, he sought federal approval of a plan to privatize Texas' social services.

Bush also helped make Texas the leading producer of wind powered electricity in the U.S. In 1996, Bush made wind power a key facet of Texas' renewable energy policy. Under a 1999 Texas state law, electric retailers are obliged to buy a certain amount of energy from renewable sources (RPS), This environmentally progressive legislation is a counterpoint to the energy policies of his presidency that favored the status quo.

=== Social ===
Bush also extended government funding for organizations providing education on the dangers of alcohol and drug use and abuse, and helping to reduce domestic violence. As governor, he reached out to religious leaders such as Kirbyjon Caldwell (who would later offer the official benediction at Bush's presidential inauguration). He signed a memorandum on April 17, 2000 proclaiming June 10 to be Jesus Day in Texas, a day where he "urge[d] all Texans to answer the call to serve those in need." Although Bush was criticized for allegedly violating the Establishment Clause of the First Amendment ("Congress shall make no law respecting an establishment of religion"), his initiative was popular with most people across the state, especially religious and social conservatives. In the 1996 United States presidential election, Bush criticized Republican nominee Bob Dole for trying to bring Pro-choice advocates into the party.

=== Education ===
Texas had a mediocre record in terms of public education, and as Governor Bush made it a high priority to improve the system. He supported local control of schools, higher educational standards, and an updated academic curriculum. His program featured standardized testing, school accountability, and funding increases. He supported efforts to ensure all students could read by third grade and backed a law to end automatic grade promotion without meeting standards. His administration helped revise Texas’ education code, aiming to simplify regulations. While his leadership was praised for maintaining reforms initiated before his tenure, some critics pointed to stagnant test scores, high dropout rates, and concerns about the impact of high-stakes testing on minority students.

Bush, running for president. in 2000, boasted about his accomplishments regarding Texas education and promised to expand them to the whole country. He adopted the slogan "No Child Left Behind."

== Appointments ==
Right after his re-election, Bush named insurance commissioner Elton Bomer, a Democrat from Anderson County in East Texas, as the new Texas Secretary of State. He also appointed Michael L. Williams to the Texas Railroad Commission in 1999 upon the resignation of Carole Keeton Strayhorn (who was known as Carole Keeton Rylander at the time), who resigned following her election as Comptroller of Public Accounts in 1998.

Williams became the first African American to serve in an executive statewide office, and easily won a special election in 2000 for an unexpired term and was re-elected to six-year terms in 2002 and 2008.

== Election as president in 2000 ==
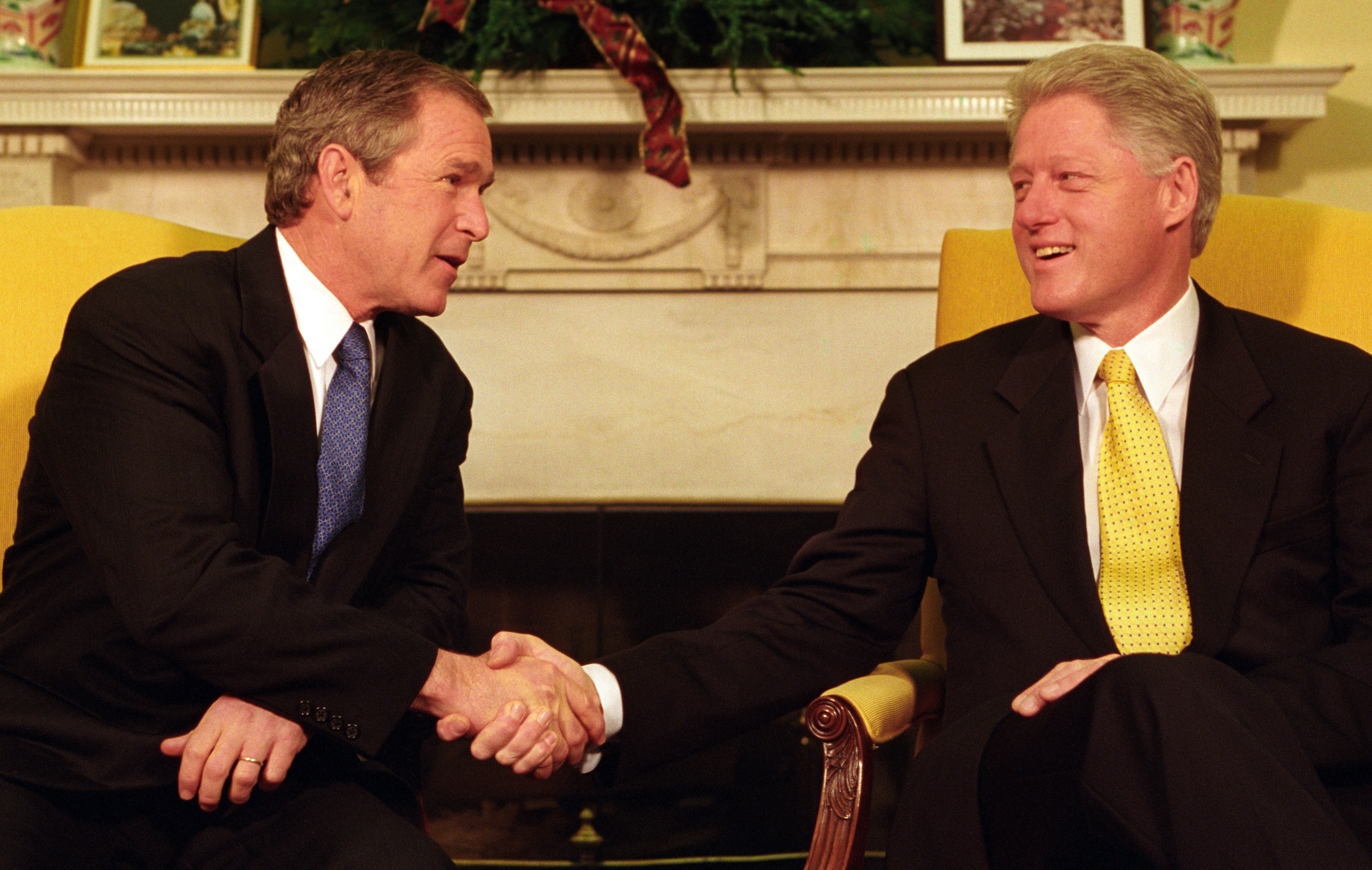
President-elect Bush speaks with outgoing president Bill Clinton in the Oval Office on December 19, 2000.

During his presidential transition, Bush resigned from the governorship on December 21, 2000.

== See also ==
- Presidency of George W. Bush
