= Murder of Sherri Jarvis =

American ex-unidentified 1980 murder victim

Sherri Jarvis
- Sherri Jarvis, c. 1979
- Born: Sherri Ann Jarvis; March 9, 1966
- Disappeared: c. March 9, 1980; Stillwater, Minnesota, U.S.
- Died: November 1, 1980 (aged 14); Huntsville, Texas, U.S.
- Cause of death: Homicide by ligature strangulation
- Body discovered: November 1, 1980; Huntsville, Walker County, Texas, United States 30.770025°N 95.6401154°W
- Resting place: Oakwood Cemetery, Huntsville, Walker County, Texas, United States; 30.7272°N 95.5424°W (approximate)
- Other names: Tati, Walker County Jane Doe, WCJD
- Known for: Formerly unidentified victim of homicide; unsolved murder
- Height: 5 ft 6 in (1.68 m) (approximate)
- Website: Who Was Walker County Jane Doe? - Sherri Ann Jarvis on Facebook

Sherri Ann Jarvis (March 9, 1966 – November 1, 1980) was an American murder victim from Forest Lake, Minnesota, whose body was discovered in Huntsville, Texas, on November 1, 1980. Her body was discovered within hours of her sexual assault and murder, and remained unidentified for 41 years before investigators announced her identification via forensic genealogy in November 2021.

Despite initial efforts to discover both her identity and that of her murderer(s), the investigation into Jarvis's murder gradually became a cold case. Numerous efforts were made to determine her identity, including several forensic facial reconstructions of how she may have appeared in life. The investigation into her murder is ongoing.

Prior to her identification, Jarvis was known as the Walker County Jane Doe in reference to the county in which her body was discovered and where she was later buried in a donated casket.

== Discovery ==
On November 1, 1980, the nude body of a girl estimated to be between the ages of 14 and 18 was discovered by a truck driver who had been driving past the Sam Houston National Forest. She was lying face-down in an area of grass approximately 20 feet (6.1 m) from the shoulder of Interstate Highway 45, and two miles north of Huntsville. This individual called police at 9:20 a.m. to report his discovery.

The victim had been deceased for approximately six hours, thus placing her time of death around 3:20 a.m. A rectangular brown pendant containing a smoky blue or brown glass colored stone on a thin gold chain necklace was found around her neck. Her ears were pierced, but no earrings were found in her ears nor at the crime scene. High-heeled red leather sandals with light brown straps, which investigators would subsequently discover the girl had been seen carrying while alive, were also recovered from the scene. The remainder of her clothing was missing.

=== Autopsy ===
The decedent was approximately five feet six inches (1.68 m) in height, weighed between 105 and 120 pounds (48 and 54 kg), (Note: Several sources specifically state the weight of Walker County Jane Doe to be 108 pounds (49 kg).) and was described by the Harris County Medical Examiner as being a "well-nourished" individual. Her eyes were hazel, and her hair was approximately 10 inches in length and light brown in color, with what has been described as a possible reddish tint, although her hair bore no evidence of having received color treatment. The decedent's fingernails were bare, and her toenails had been painted pink. Distinctive features upon her body were a vertical scar measuring one-and-a-half inches at the edge of her right eyebrow and the fact that her right nipple was inverted. Due to the general condition of the decedent's body, including her overall health, nutrition and the excellent dental care she had received in life, she was believed to have come from a middle-class household.

The cause of death was certified by the coroner to be asphyxia due to ligature strangulation, possibly inflicted via a pantyhose, fragments of which—along with the decedent's underwear—were found inside the victim's vaginal cavity. The pantyhose and underwear had likely been placed inside the girl's vaginal cavity in an attempt to prevent her body from bleeding as she was transported to the site of her discovery. She had been sexually assaulted prior to her death with a large blunt instrument both vaginally and anally. It is unknown if the girl had been conventionally raped, as no biological evidence attesting to this form of sexual assault was discovered either at the crime scene or in the coroner's subsequent examination of her body. (Note: Contemporary paperwork pertaining to Walker County Jane Doe does not note any swabbing being conducted upon the decedent for fluid evidence such as saliva or semen.) The girl had also been severely beaten prior to her death as many bruises were evident across her body, with her lips and right eyelid, in particular, being extensively swollen. In addition, her right shoulder bore a deep and visible bite mark.

== Investigation ==
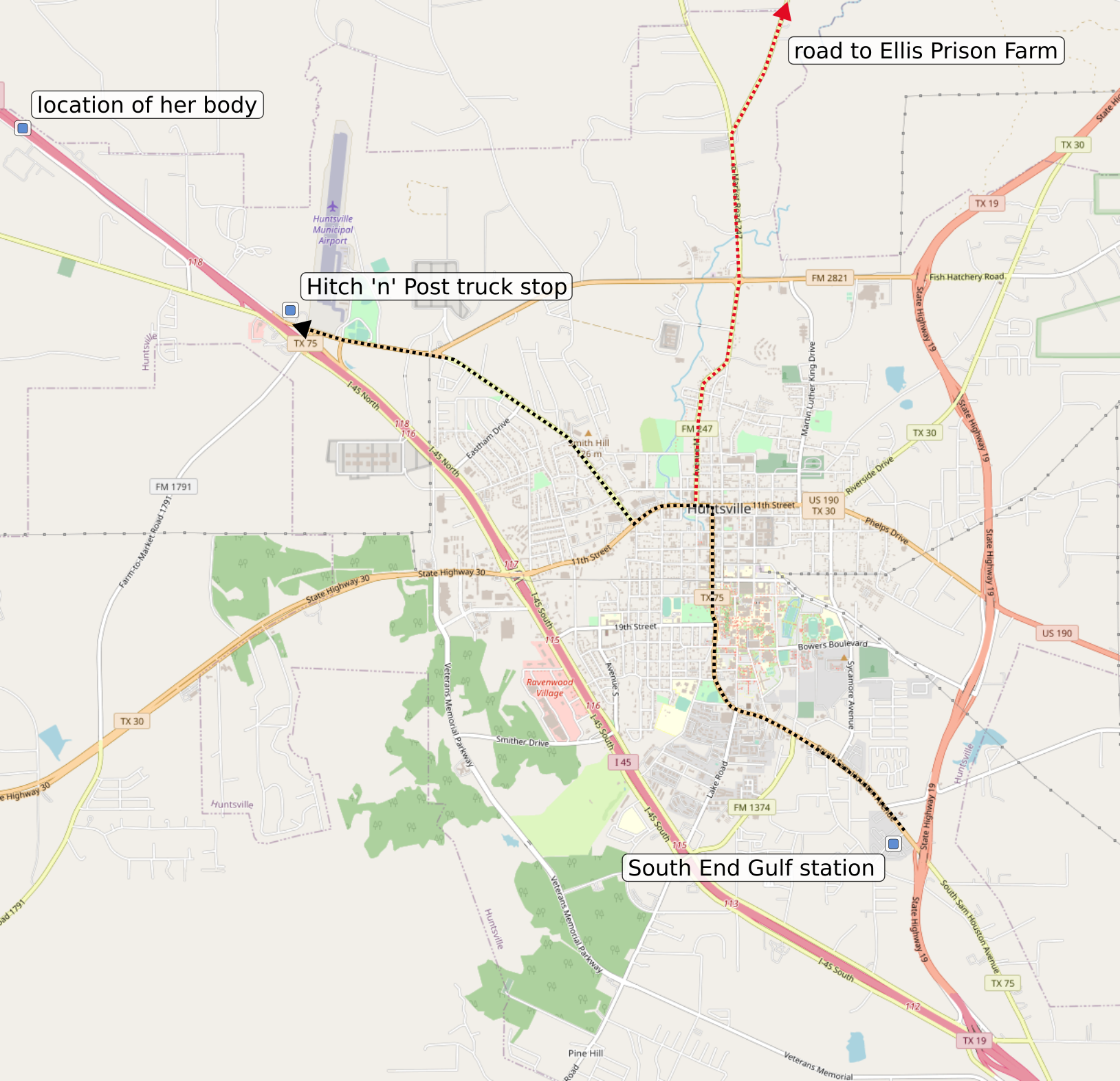
Map of Huntsville showing locations associated with the murder of Jarvis. The black dotted line indicates a likely route taken based on eyewitness accounts; the red dotted line indicates the direction to Ellis Prison farm.

=== Sightings ===
Following exhaustive witness appeals and extensive media accounts regarding this murder, numerous individuals (all of whom are now deceased) informed investigators they had seen a teenage girl matching the decedent's description within the 24 hours prior to her murder. These individuals include the manager of a South End Gulf station and two employees at the Hitch 'n' Post truck stop, all of whom described this girl as wearing blue jeans, a dirty yellow pullover, and a white knit sweater with noticeably large pockets that extended past her waist. This girl had been carrying red leather-strapped high-heeled sandals.

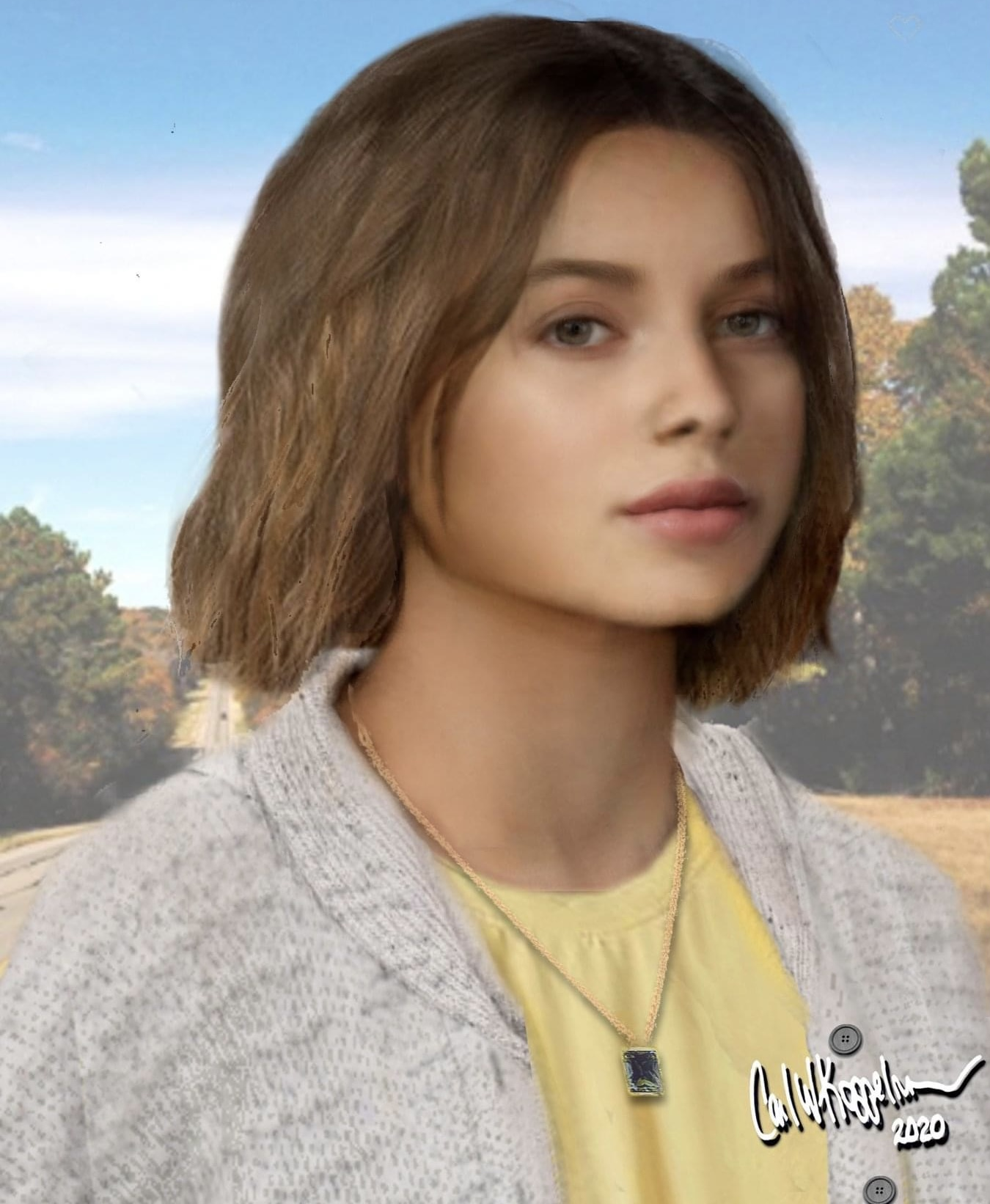
Three-quarter reconstruction of the victim, illustrating the necklace found upon her body and the knit sweater eyewitnesses reported she had worn

According to the first witness, the girl—appearing somewhat disheveled—had arrived at the South End Gulf station at approximately 6:30 p.m. on October 31. At this location, she had exited a blue 1973 or 1974 model Chevrolet Caprice with a light-colored top, which had been driven by a white male. This witness stated the girl had asked for directions to the Texas Department of Corrections Ellis Prison Farm. After receiving directions, the girl had left the Gulf station on foot, and was later seen walking north on Sam Houston Avenue. (Note: The Texas Department of Corrections Ellis Prison Farm is located approximately 14 miles (23 km) from where the body of Jarvis was subsequently discovered.)

This same girl was later seen at the Hitch 'n' Post truck stop alongside Interstate 45, where she again requested directions to the Texas Department of Corrections Ellis Prison Farm, claiming "a friend" was waiting for her at this location. In response, a waitress drew a map providing directions to the prison farm, which she then handed to the girl. This waitress informed investigators that she had suspected the girl was a runaway and that in their brief conversation, the girl had informed her she was from either Rockport or Aransas Pass, Texas. The girl had also claimed to the waitress that she was 19 years old; when the waitress expressed doubts about her stated age and asked whether her parents knew her whereabouts, the girl reportedly replied, "Who cares?" (Note: Both of these eyewitnesses would positively identify the girl's body in the morgue, each conclusively stating she had been the individual who had asked them for specific directions the afternoon prior to the discovery of her body.)

=== Ellis Prison Farm ===
Both inmates and employees of the Ellis Prison Farm were canvassed and shown mortuary photographs of the victim, although none were able to identify her. According to a detective working the cold case in the 21st century, only one inmate was of a similar age to the victim. Investigators were never able to establish a connection between the two. Investigators traveled to both the Rockport and Aransas Pass districts to consult with law enforcement personnel regarding any missing females whose physical descriptions matched that of the victim. Staff at schools in both districts were also contacted by investigators for the same purpose. Numerous Texas high school yearbooks were searched for any female known to be missing whose physical features matched her description. None yielded results, and no missing person reports relating to young Caucasian females were matched to the victim at the time.

Despite the fact police and media appeals in the towns of Rockport or Aransas Pass to discover the identity of the victim failed to produce any fruitful leads as to her identity, it was thought that she may have indeed hailed from the general region she had stated to the waitress at the Hitch 'n' Post truck stop the evening prior to her murder.

== Funeral ==
On January 16, 1981, the unidentified girl was buried in the Adickes Addition at Oakwood Cemetery. Her burial followed an open-casket funeral, and the cemetery in which she was interred is located within the city where her body was found. She is buried beneath a tombstone donated by Morris Memorials; the inscription upon her tombstone reads, "Unknown white female. Died Nov. 1, 1980." A new tombstone bearing her name, nickname, photograph, and the inscription "Never alone and loved by many" has since been erected.

"That person made a statement when they did that. Honestly, no one should ever be treated like that ... If we could positively identify the victim there is a very good chance we could identify the suspect. At this point, I'm willing to look anywhere. If there is a missing person from New York that looks like her, I'm willing to look at it."

— Walker County Sheriff's Office Detective Thomas Bean referring to the murder of Walker County Jane Doe and the mindset of her murderer. March 4, 2018

== Ongoing investigation ==
=== Further forensic analysis ===
The remains of Walker County Jane Doe were exhumed in 1999 in order to conduct a further forensic examination of her remains, including the obtaining of a DNA sample from her body. This second forensic examination of her body revised the likely age of Walker County Jane Doe to be between 14 and 18 years old, with investigators stating they believed the most likely age of Walker County Jane Doe to be between 14-and-a-half and 16-and-a-half years old.

In November 2015, the case was officially reopened by the Walker County Sheriff's Office.

DNA testing was also conducted on the high-heeled red leather sandals found at the crime scene; the results remain undisclosed. Local police departments also actively monitored other missing-person reports for potential matches to the victim. Investigators have also reached out to the public via various online websites, news media, and television networks in hopes of generating further leads of inquiry—all of which, to date, have been unsuccessful in identifying her murderer(s).

Additional forensic facial reconstruction of Jarvis created by the NCMEC

=== Facial reconstructions ===
Several forensic facial reconstructions have been created to illustrate estimates of how Walker County Jane Doe may have looked in life. In 1990, forensic and portrait artist Karen T. Taylor created a postmortem drawing of Walker County Jane Doe in which she incorporated an estimation as to the appearance of the necklace she had been wearing. An investigator at the Walker County Sheriff's office has also created a facial rendering of the victim.

Taylor has included this case in her book Forensic Art and Illustration, in which she confessed to having experienced difficulties in creating her sketch of the decedent as the only frontal photograph made available to her at the time was of one taken after the victim had received extensive reconstructive cosmetic treatment at the Huntsville Funeral Home in order for her facial features to be sufficient to be viewed in an open-casket funeral. Taylor further explained that a scaled photograph of the girl's necklace was not made available to her, and she was forced to estimate the size of this item of jewelry for the facial reconstruction she produced.

Within the decade prior to Walker County Jane Doe's identification, the National Center for Missing & Exploited Children constructed and released two facial reconstructions of how the victim may have appeared in life. The first facial reconstruction was released in 2012, and the second shortly after the 35th anniversary of her murder. All facial reconstructions were created with the aid of studying mortuary photographs taken of the victim.

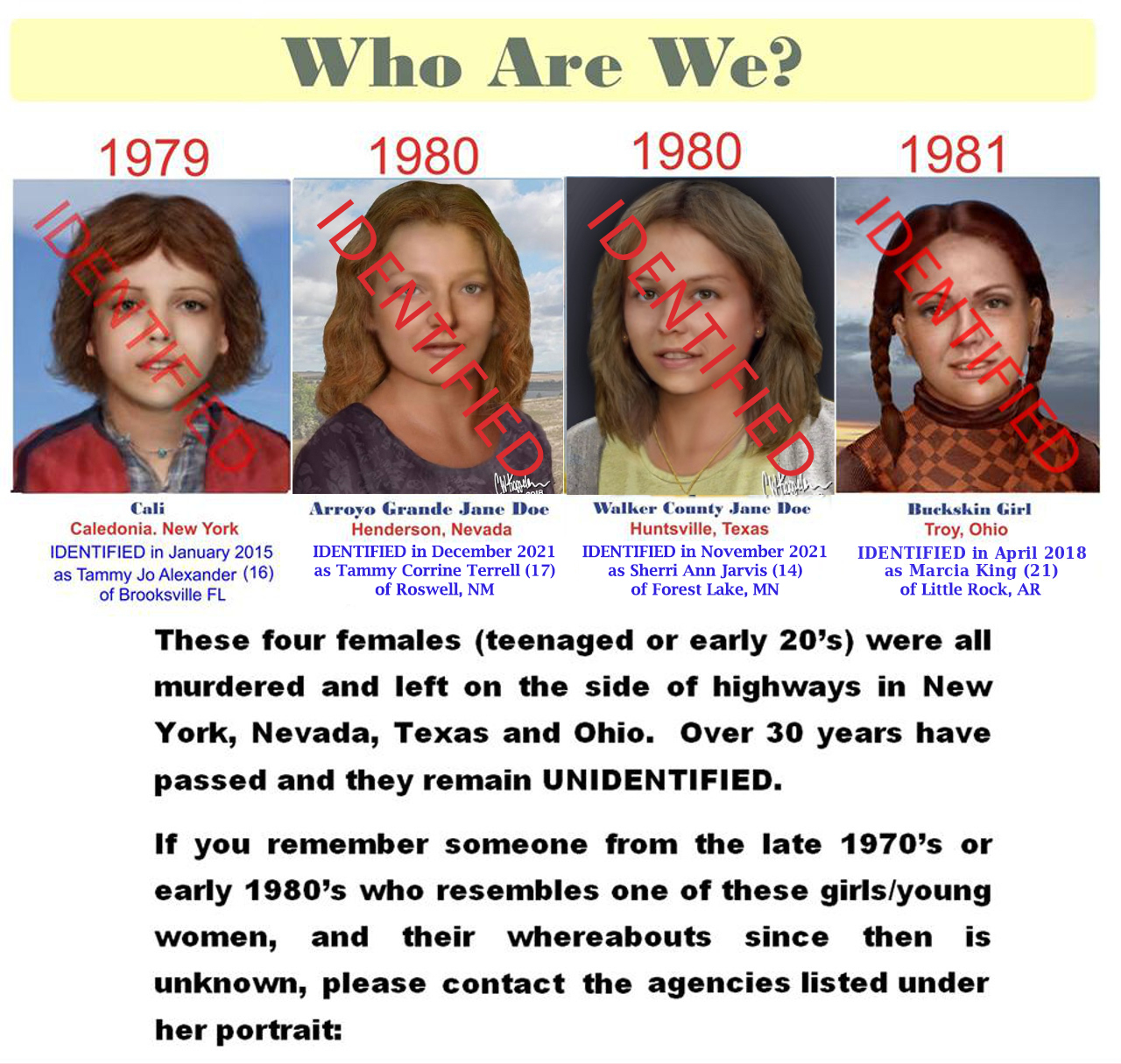
An array of four unidentified young females whose faces have been forensically reconstructed—all of whom have since been identified. Sherri Jarvis is depicted third from the left.

== Identification ==
In 2020, the Walker County Sheriff's Office partnered with Othram Incorporated to attempt to identify Walker County Jane Doe via genetic genealogy. Initial attempts to extract usable genetic materials from her remains were unsuccessful, but testing on her preserved tissue samples yielded usable DNA, which was used to generate a genetic profile of the victim and construct a family tree. Using this family tree, the victim's living relatives were identified and located. DNA swabs from these individuals were used to confirm the identity of Walker County Jane Doe in 2021.

On November 9, 2021, the Walker County Sheriff's Office publicly announced the identity of Walker County Jane Doe as 14-year-old Sherri Ann Jarvis, who had run away from Stillwater, Minnesota in 1980. Her identification had previously been announced in late September 2021 by forensic artist Carl Koppelman, who had produced several forensic reconstructions of the victim, and who announced that her identity was temporarily being withheld to give her family sufficient time to grieve privately.

Jarvis was known as "Tati" to her friends. She had been removed from her home and placed under the state's custody at age 13 due to habitual truancy and had run away shortly after her 14th birthday. Her final contact with her family was in the form of a letter penned to her mother from Denver in August 1980. In this letter, Jarvis indicated that she was frustrated with being placed in state custody but intended to eventually return home. At this formal announcement, a statement from her family was read, expressing gratitude for "the dedication" of all who had worked to identify Jarvis and to "provide [the] long-awaited, albeit painful answers" to their questions as to her whereabouts, adding that they took comfort from the fact she had been identified. This statement also thanked those who had visited her grave while she had remained unidentified and emphasized the family's wish for her murderer(s) to be brought to justice.

The investigation into Jarvis's murder is ongoing, and investigators have stated discovering Jarvis's identity has given them "some positive leads" of inquiry that they are actively pursuing.

== Other hypotheses ==
=== Gender of perpetrator ===
Some individuals have speculated that Jarvis may have been assaulted and murdered by a female assailant as opposed to a male. This hypothesis was initially suggested by journalist Michael Hargraves, who based this assumption upon the fact that no semen was found upon or within Jarvis's body, or at the actual crime scene, and that the only sexual assaults conclusively proven to have been committed upon the girl were performed by aggressively forcing an object or objects into her bodily orifices. Hargraves elaborated his hypothesis by stating that men who commit crimes of a sexual nature are typically known to bite their victims upon sensitive areas of the body as opposed to the shoulder, as had occurred in this case.

The act of male perpetrators of murders committed with a sexual motivation occasionally collecting souvenirs from their victims was also noted to be inconsistent with this case, as the necklace Jarvis had worn was still present upon her body. However, the fact that it is unknown if Jarvis had worn other items of jewelry at the time of her murder, and that her ears were pierced yet her earlobes held no earrings may negate this portion of Hargraves' hypothesis. Furthermore, most of the girl's clothing was missing from the crime scene.

=== Links to other murders ===
A possibility exists that Jarvis may have been murdered by the same perpetrator as another formerly unidentified murder victim, Debra Jackson, known as "Orange Socks", who was murdered almost exactly a year prior to Jarvis and whose body was found in Georgetown, Texas. (Note: "Orange Socks" was identified in 2019 as 23-year-old Debra Jackson.) Serial killer Henry Lee Lucas has also been named as a possible suspect in this case, although the bite mark found upon Jarvis's shoulder was inconsistent with Lucas's dentistry. No prime suspects have been named in this murder, although police have considered the possibility that the victim was murdered by a serial killer.

In 2017, a theory arose that Jarvis may have been killed by the same perpetrator known to have murdered three other females in 1980, whose bodies were dumped alongside Interstate 45. All were strangled; some were sexually assaulted in a similar manner. All four victims were described by investigators as being "high risk".

One of the women, aged between 20 and 30, was found on October 15, 1980, in Houston. She was a black female with possible Asian heritage, and had died approximately three months prior to the discovery of her body. A second female was also black. This decedent was estimated to be between 16 and 26 years old. Her body was discovered beneath a bridge in Houston in December 1980.

== Exclusions ==
The information compiled by the National Missing and Unidentified Persons System states the following individuals were each positively excluded as being Walker County Jane Doe prior to her 2021 identification.

Name	Birth date	Missing date	Location	Age at time of murder of Walker County Jane Doe	Circumstances
Joyce Brewer	January 24, 1954	September 6, 1970	Grand Prairie, Texas	26	Brewer is believed to have run away from home with a boyfriend following an argument with her parents.
Mary Trlica	November 15, 1957	December 23, 1974	Fort Worth, Texas	22	Apparently abducted with two friends while Christmas shopping. Within days of Trlica's disappearance, a letter was mailed to her husband claiming she and her companions were traveling to Houston. This letter was written by a right-handed person, whereas Trlica was left-handed.
Wendy Eaton	May 26, 1959	May 17, 1975	Media, Pennsylvania	21	Eaton disappeared in Media, Pennsylvania while walking to purchase a gift for her brother. Her case remains unsolved.
Maria Anjiras	August 10, 1961	February 12, 1976	Norwalk, Connecticut	19	A girl who ran away from her home in 1976. Anjiras had taken money and personal possessions with her. Anjiras is known to have threatened to run away from home a few weeks prior to her disappearance, although on this occasion, her father had dissuaded her from doing so.
Cindy King	July 27, 1961	July 19, 1977	Grants Pass, Oregon	19	King disappeared in July 1977. She had worn a retainer when she disappeared and had a notable scar near one of her temples, like the Walker County Jane Doe.
Tina Kemp	October 20, 1964	February 3, 1979	Felton, Delaware	16	Last seen leaving her home after helping to hang the family laundry. Kemp has never been heard from since, and is believed to have been murdered.
Kimberly Rae Doss	September 11, 1962	May 29, 1979	Jacksonville, Florida	18	Vanished while visiting a relative. Speculation remains she may have been abducted by a motorcycle gang, although no direct evidence exists to support this hypothesis. Doss had markedly similar physical characteristics to Walker County Jane Doe.
Marcia Estelle Remick	May 7, 1962	June 9, 1979	Virginia Beach, Virginia	18	Remick disappeared on her way to visit a friend on the oceanfront. Rumours later circulated she was alive in Florida, although this has never been substantiated. Foul play is suspected.
Angela Meeker	July 9, 1965	July 7, 1979	Tacoma, Washington	15	Meeker vanished two days before her 14th birthday. She was last seen at a party. Her physical appearance is markedly similar to the Walker County Jane Doe.
Karen Zendrosky	September 2, 1963	October 23, 1979	Bordentown Township, New Jersey	17	Zendrosky disappeared from a now defunct bowling alley. Her disappearance remains unsolved, although investigators strongly suspect foul play in her case, believing the most likely location of Zendrosky's body to be a sludge pit located in Hamilton.
Deborah McCall	March 30, 1963	November 5, 1979	Downers Grove, Illinois	17	Last seen departing from her school in Downers Grove, Illinois. McCall had markedly similar physical characteristics as the victim.
Marie Blee	April 16, 1964	November 21, 1979	Craig, Colorado	16	Blee was last seen at a party in the company of a male friend. Foul play is suspected to be the reason behind her disappearance.
Kristy Lynn Booth	December 26, 1960	February 2, 1980	Midland, Texas	19	A 19-year-old waitress last seen at a nightclub. Investigators do not believe Booth left this nightclub willingly. Her vehicle was later found abandoned on South Highway 349.
Rachael Garden	December 30, 1964	March 22, 1980	Newton, New Hampshire	15	Likely abducted while walking from a store toward the home of a friend with whom she intended to spend the night. She was last seen talking to three male acquaintances of hers (one of whom later served a sentence for assault and rape) who had been seated in a dark-colored vehicle.
Laureen Rahn	April 3, 1966	April 26, 1980	Manchester, New Hampshire	14	Rahn is believed to have been abducted either from within her home or the close proximity of her address on the evening of her disappearance. She did not take her purse, shoes or any additional clothing; likely indicating she had been abducted from her home via force or guile.
Roxane Easland	c. 1956	June 28, 1980	Anchorage, Alaska	24	A prostitute and erotic dancer who disappeared after leaving her apartment to meet with an unidentified male client on Northern Lights Boulevard. She is believed to have been murdered by serial killer Robert Hansen.
Carla Corley	December 31, 1965	August 12, 1980	Birmingham, Alabama	14	Corley is believed to have been abducted from her home. Her mother discovered the family's front door ajar and evident signs of a struggle within their kitchen. She was declared legally dead several years after her disappearance.

== See also ==
- Cold case
- Crime in Texas
- List of murdered American children
- List of solved missing person cases (1980s)
- List of unsolved murders (1980–1999)
- National Center for Missing & Exploited Children
- The Doe Network
- Unidentified decedent

== Cited works and further reading ==
- Evans, Colin (1996). The Casebook of Forensic Detection: How Science Solved 100 of the World's Most Baffling Crimes. New York: John Wiley & Sons, Inc. ISBN 978-0-471-07650-6.
- Finkelhor, David; Sedlak, Andrea; Hotaling, Gerald T. (1990). Missing, Abducted, Runaway, and Thrownaway Children in America. New York: Officers of Juvenile Justice and Delinquency Prevention. ISBN 0-788-12651-2.
- Halber, Deborah (2015). The Skeleton Crew: How Amateur Sleuths Are Solving America's Coldest Cases. New York: Simon & Schuster. ISBN 978-1-451-65758-6.
- Newton, Michael (2004). The Encyclopedia of Unsolved Crimes. New York: Facts on File. ISBN 978-0-816-07818-9.
- Pettem, Silvia (2013). Cold Case Research: Resources for Unidentified, Missing, and Cold Homicide Cases. Boca Raton: CRC Press. ISBN 978-1-466-57053-5.
- Strand, Ginger (2012). Killer on the Road: Violence and the American Interstate. Austin: University of Texas Press. ISBN 978-0-292-72637-6.
- Taylor, Karen T. (2000). Forensic Art and Illustration. New York: CRC Press. ISBN 978-0-849-38118-8.
