= The Confession Killer =

2019 American documentary television mini-series

- Genre: Documentary; Crime
- Directed by: Robert Kenner; Taki Oldham
- Country of origin: United States
- Original language: English
- No. of seasons: 1
- No. of episodes: 5

Production
- Running time: 45–50 minutes

Original release
- Network: Netflix
- Release: December 6, 2019

The Confession Killer is a 2019 American true crime documentary miniseries directed by Robert Kenner and Taki Oldham. The plot revolves around the 1983 case of Henry Lee Lucas, who confessed to over 200 murders in the United States. Years after his admissions, they turned out to be lies.

== Cast ==
- Nan Cuba as Self – Journalist
- Bob Prince as Self – Retired Texas Ranger
- Hugh Aynesworth as Self - Journalist
- Phil Ryan as Self – Retired Texas Ranger
- Clemmie Schroeder as Self – Jailhouse Minister
- Vic Feazell as Self – Former District Attorney
- Mike Cox as Self – Former Texas Rangers Spokesperson
- Parker McCollough as Self – Lucas's Attorney
- Joyce Lemons as Self – Debbie's Mother
- Ninfa Sheppard Lambert as Self – Rita's Sister
- Linda Erwin as Self – Retired Homicide Detective
- Anne Gilmore as Self – Daughter of Joan Gilmore
- Larry Hawkins as Self – Retired Detective
- Truman Simons as Self – Former Sheriff's Deputy
- Jim Henderson as Self – Journalist
- Liz Flatt as Self – Debbie's Sister

== Release ==
The Confession Killer was released on December 6, 2019, on Netflix.
