= Murder of Martha Morrison =

Formerly an unidentified American murder victim

Martha Morrison
- Born: 1957; Eugene, Oregon, U.S.
- Disappeared: September 1, 1974 (aged 17); Portland, Oregon, U.S.
- Status: Remains identified on July 13, 2015
- Died: September 1974 (aged 17)
- Cause of death: Homicide
- Body discovered: October 12, 1974; Vancouver, Washington, U.S.
- Height: 5 ft 4 in (1.63 m)

Martha Marie Morrison (1957 – September 1974) was a 17-year-old American girl who was murdered in 1974, and whose remains went unidentified for over 40 years after their discovery.

Morrison, a resident of Portland, Oregon, disappeared under mysterious circumstances in September 1974. On October 12, 1974, human remains of two women were found in Dole Valley near Vancouver, Washington. One was immediately identified as Carol Platt Valenzuela, but the other individual was unable to be identified at the time. In 2015, the remains were identified by means of DNA profiling as those of Morrison.

After Morrison's remains were identified, law enforcement encouraged the public to submit tips, as the murder was still unsolved. In August 2017, a bloodstain on a pistol owned by a longtime suspect, Warren Forrest, was matched to Morrison through DNA testing. Prior to Forrest's identification as a suspect, serial killers Ted Bundy and Randall Woodfield had both been considered a person of interest in Morrison and Valenzuela's murders. Forrest was charged with Morrison’s murder in 2020, and found guilty of first degree murder in February 2023.

== Background ==
Morrison reportedly grew up in foster care while living in Lane County, Oregon near Eugene. Her sister, Reba, recalls that their mother was deaf and that Martha was skilled in sign language. She attended Roosevelt High School in Portland and the Corvallis Farm School in Corvallis. Subsequently, she went to Arizona to participate in the Job Corps program.

She had a history of drug use and of running away from the homes of both her biological and foster families, and the Corvallis Farm School as well.

She was last seen leaving her apartment, which she and a man had rented. The couple reportedly quarreled, and Martha subsequently went missing. Shortly before her disappearance on September 1, 1974, Morrison had visited her family in Eugene with the man.

== Investigation ==
After the remains were discovered on October 12, 1974, the bones of the victims were examined nationwide in hopes of identifying them. One of the victims was quickly identified via dental records as 18-year-old Carol Platt Valenzuela, but those of the second victim were unknown. Valenzuela had been reported missing on August 4 by her husband after she failed to return home after hitchhiking to Vancouver on August 2. Investigators hoped that her identification would perhaps increase the likelihood of identification for the then-unidentified Morrison. They intended to question Valenzuela's husband following her identification, yet he was recovering from an aspirin overdose at the time. He was arrested but eventually released after passing a polygraph test on October 25.

All examinations were unsuccessful in identifying the second victim, originally estimated to be 20 to 25 years old. The remains were originally examined by an anthropologist from the University of Washington. Forensic facial reconstructions were created of the victim from both frontal and profile views and released through a newspaper, but went unrecognized by the public. The victim's physical description was also listed, including the fact that she had curly-textured hair and dental hygiene problems. The victim also appeared to have given birth at some point, although it is unknown if Morrison ever had a child. Police returned to the scene following the initial discovery in order to possibly obtain more evidence. A new metal detector, borrowed from a Snohomish County resident was also used.

Examination indicated the victims had been deceased for at least two weeks prior. Decomposition and animal activity had made it difficult to estimate the time or cause of death, although authorities presumed they were murdered. The remains may have also been deposited at the location at different times. Several missing persons at the time were considered, including Patty Hearst (who was later found alive).

Investigator Nikki Costa stated in an interview conducted after the identification that a great deal of time had been spent on the investigation, including following leads that may have linked the case to serial killer Gary Ridgway. Ted Bundy was also listed as a person of interest in both Morrison's and Valenzuela's case prior to 2017, when Warren Leslie Forrest was identified as the prime suspect.

Morrison, while a missing person, was ruled out as the possible identity of a female homicide victim, nicknamed “Orange Socks", who was estimated to have been between 15 and 30 when she was located in Texas in 1979. This latter victim was identified in August 2019 as Debra Jackson.

== Identification ==
DNA was obtained from Martha Morrison's sister and half-brother which was used to develop a genetic profile to compare to potential matches. After the testing was complete, it was compared to the currently unidentified remains, whose DNA profile was developed in 2012. Similarities were noted, yet a definite match was not established. Both Morrison and the unidentified victim were eventually entered into the National Missing and Unidentified Persons System, which specializes in locating missing people and identifying human remains. Ten missing people were excluded as possible identities of the remains until the identification was made in July 2015. Morrison's skull and some other bones were mislabeled as Carol Platt Valenzuela's while they were in storage. Investigator Nikki Costa said this was one of the reasons why the remains were unidentified for so long. In 2011, this problem was discovered when the skull's teeth were noticed to be different from Valenzuela's dental records.

After previous unsuccessful testing, the National Center for Missing & Exploited Children stated they would pay for an exhumation of the victim's father in order to retrieve DNA and compare it with the unidentified remains. The result of this last test was a definitive indication that the remains were those of Martha Morrison (probability of 99.999998%).

Investigators continued to look at suspected serial killer Warren Leslie Forrest. At the time, Forrest was incarcerated for the murder of Krista Kay Blake in July 1974. He was arrested on October 2, 1974 — just ten days before the bodies of Martha Morrison and Carol Platt Valenzuela were found in Dole Valley. Law enforcement officials conducted DNA testing on a blood stain found on an air pistol owned by Forrest, which was previously believed to have belonged to a different woman — one of six others he had attacked during his years at large. Officials later stated that the results proved he not only killed Morrison, but also Valenzuela, due to the fact that the two bodies were found together. Forrest is also a suspect in the 1974 disappearance of Diane Gilchrist and the 1971 disappearance of Jamie Grissom.

In March 2016, police appealed to the public for assistance with identifying Morrison's boyfriend at the time. He was not a suspect in the case, but investigators believed he could have relevant information.

On February 1, 2023, Warren Leslie Forrest was found guilty of first degree murder for Morrison's killing.

== See also ==
- List of solved missing person cases: 1950–1999
