= List of Portland State Vikings in the NFL draft =

This is a list of Portland State Vikings football players in the NFL draft.

== Key ==
| B | Back | K | Kicker | NT | Nose tackle |
| C | Center | LB | Linebacker | FB | Fullback |
| DB | Defensive back | P | Punter | HB | Halfback |
| DE | Defensive end | QB | Quarterback | WR | Wide receiver |
| DT | Defensive tackle | RB | Running back | G | Guard |
| E | End | T | Offensive tackle | TE | Tight end |

== Selections ==
| Year | Round | Overall | Name | Team | Position | Notes |
|---|---|---|---|---|---|---|
| 1971 | 12 | 303 | Tim Von Dulm | St. Louis Cardinals | QB | |
| 1972 | 7 | 172 | Charles Stoudmire | Detroit Lions | WR | |
| 1974 | 17 | 428 | Randall Woodfield | Green Bay Packers | WR | |
| 1978 | 7 | 181 | Dave Stief | St. Louis Cardinals | WR | |
| 1981 | 2 | 33 | Neil Lomax | St. Louis Cardinals | QB | |
| 1981 | 9 | 242 | Ron Seawell | Los Angeles Rams | LB | |
| 1981 | 12 | 314 | Clint Didier | Washington Redskins | TE | |
| 1988 | 7 | 187 | Tracey Eaton | Houston Oilers | DB | |
| 1991 | 11 | 306 | Ted Popson | New York Giants | TE | |
| 1992 | 8 | 201 | James Fuller | San Diego Chargers | DB | |
| 1995 | 7 | 244 | Darick Holmes | Buffalo Bills | RB | |
| 1997 | 5 | 146 | Paul Bradford | San Diego Chargers | DB | |
| 2002 | 5 | 142 | Terry Charles | San Diego Chargers | WR | |
| 2007 | 6 | 182 | Adam Hayward | Tampa Bay Buccaneers | LB | |
| 2011 | 4 | 129 | Julius Thomas | Denver Broncos | TE | |
| 2014 | 7 | 226 | Mitchell Van Dyk | St. Louis Rams | T | |
