= Newport High School (Oregon) =

Public school in Newport, Oregon, United States

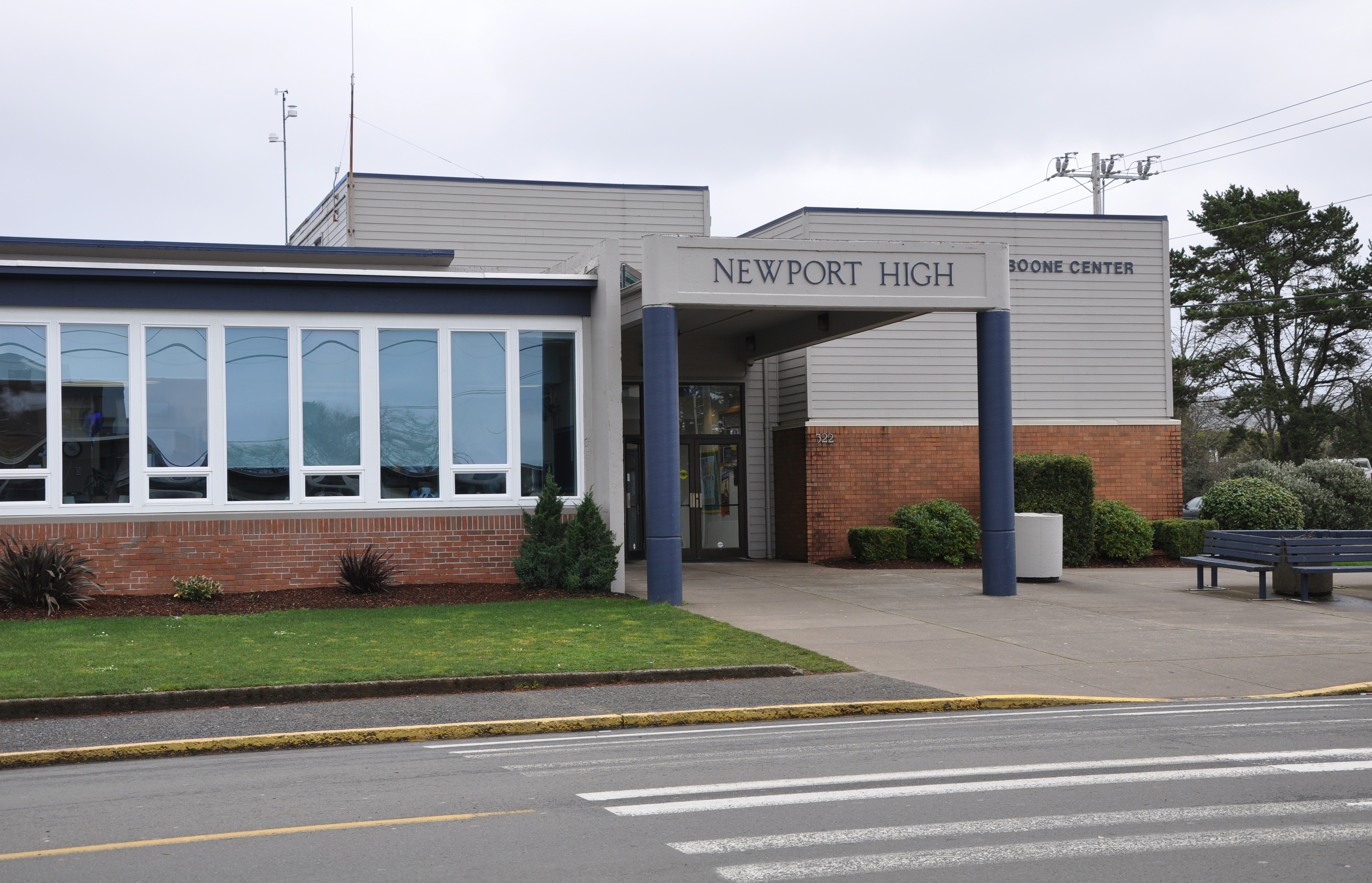

Location
- 322 NE Eads St, Newport, Lincoln County, Oregon 97365; United States; 44.638708°N 124.045992°W

Information
- Type: Public
- School district: Lincoln County School District
- Principal: Reyna Mattson
- Teaching staff: 30.67 (FTE)
- Grades: 9–12
- Enrollment: 684 (2023-2024)
- Student to teacher ratio: 22.30
- Colors: Navy, white, and red
- Athletics conference: OSAA 4A-3 Oregon West Conference
- Mascot: Cub
- Team name: Cubs
- Rival: Sweet Home High School (Oregon)
- Website: Newport High School

Newport High School is a public high school located in Newport, Oregon, United States. It is one of five high schools in the Lincoln County School District.

== Academics ==
In 2008, 67% of the school's seniors received a high school diploma. Of 211 students, 141 graduated, 44 dropped out, five received a modified diploma, and 21 were still in high school in 2009.

In 2022, 85% of the school's seniors received a high school diploma. Of 154 students, 132 graduated and 22 dropped out.

== Athletics ==
Newport High School athletic teams compete in the OSAA 4A-3 Oregon West Conference (Excluding Football, which competes in 3A-SD2). The athletic director is Shelley Moore and the athletics secretary is Noah Reed.

State Championships:

- Baseball: 1964, 1965, 1967, 1974, 2008
- Boys Soccer: 2016, 2017, 2023
- Boys Swimming: 2018, 2019, 2020, 2024, 2026
- Boys Track and Field: 2019
- Boys Cross Country: 2023, 2024
- Cheerleading: 2005, 2006, 2019, 2024, 2025
- Girls Basketball: 1978
- Girls Swimming: 2024, 2026
- Girls Track and Field: 2011

== Notable alumni ==
- Nathan Ball, host of the PBS Kids show Design Squad
- Brent Barton, Oregon House of Representatives, District 51
- Jamie Kovac, 'Fury' of American Gladiators
- Randall Woodfield, the I-5 Killer
