= Warren Forrest =

American murderer (born 1949)

- Born: Warren Leslie Forrest; June 29, 1949 (age 77); Vancouver, Washington, U.S.
- Convictions: Murder (2 counts); Kidnapping; Rape; Attempted murder (2 counts)
- Penalty: 2 life sentences

Details
- Victims: 2–7+
- Span of crimes: July 11 – September 1, 1974 (confirmed); 1971 – 1974 (suspected)
- Country: United States
- State: Washington
- Date apprehended: October 2, 1974
- Imprisoned at: Airway Heights Corrections Center, Airway Heights, Washington

Warren Leslie Forrest (born June 29, 1949) is an American convicted double murderer and suspected serial killer, sentenced to two life terms for the murders of a young woman, Krysta Blake, and teenage girl, Martha Morrison, in Clark County, Washington, in 1974. He is considered the prime suspect in at least five similar murders and disappearances dating back to 1971. Forrest has been incarcerated on a single murder count since 1974, and was convicted on another count on February 4, 2023, after DNA linked him to the murder of Martha Morrison. The jury took just an hour and a half to convict Forrest of 17-year-old Martha's murder.

== Early life ==
Warren Forrest was born on June 29, 1949, in Vancouver, Washington, the younger of two sons of parents Harold and Delores Forrest. He attended the Fort Vancouver High School and competed on the school's track and field team, of which he became the captain. After graduating in September 1967, Forrest and his older brother Marvin were drafted during the Vietnam War, where the former served as a fire control crewman for the 15th Field Artillery Regiment at the Homestead Air Force Base in Homestead, Florida.

After his discharge, he returned to Vancouver and married his high school sweetheart Sharon Ann Hart in August 1969; they had two children. Shortly after their marriage, they moved to Fort Bliss, Texas, and then to Newport Beach, California, where Forrest enrolled at the North American School of Conservation and Ecology. However, he quickly lost interest in studying and dropped out at the end of the first term. In late 1970, Forrest and his wife moved to Battle Ground, Washington, where he found a job with the Clark County Parks Department.

== Exposure ==
=== Investigation and arrest ===
On October 2, 1974, Forrest was arrested on charges of kidnapping, rape and attempted murder. On the previous day, he had met a 20-year-old woman in Portland, Oregon and lured her into his car under the pretense of doing a photo shoot. Instead, he drove to a city park and assaulted her, raping her several times, torturing her and shooting her with darts from an air-powered dart gun. Forrest then drove her to Camas, Washington, where he stabbed her six times with a knife near Lacamas Lake and attempted to strangle her.

The woman fell unconscious after the attack, and as Forrest believed she had died, he completely undressed her and threw her into some nearby bushes. However, she woke up two hours later and managed to make her way to the city, where she was found by passers-by. She was driven to a nearby hospital and given emergency medical attention, and survived. Once in a stable condition, she provided a description of her assailant and the distinctive features of his car; according to her testimony, he drove a blue 1973 Ford van and had greeted several park employees while driving through the area. As the park was under the Parks Department's jurisdiction, police assumed that the perpetrator was an employee and started looking into their alibis.

The examination revealed that Forrest was absent from work on the day of the attack, being on sick leave. As he owned a 1973 blue Ford van and matched the perpetrator's description very well, police obtained a search warrant for his home and vehicle. While searching his home, officers found jewelry and clothing fragments that belonged to the 20-year-old who also conclusively identified him as her attacker once she was presented a photograph of him. Forrest was unable to provide himself with a convincing alibi, and was charged the same day.

Soon after his arrest was publicized, they were able to identify him as the kidnapper of a 15-year-old girl who stated that she had also been assaulted by Forrest. According to her testimony, on July 17, 1974, she was attempting to hitchhike out of Ridgefield and voluntarily got into Forrest's van after he offered her a ride. Forrest raped and beat her, and after they reached the slopes of Tukes Mountain, she was bound, gagged and tied to a tree. Forrest intended to kill her, but she managed to chew through the gag and hide in nearby bushes until the morning, when she emerged and sought help. Despite her testimony, Forrest was solely charged with the kidnapping and attempted murder of the 20-year-old woman. His legal team soon filed a motion for a psychiatric evaluation, which determined that Forrest was legally insane. He was thus acquitted by reason of insanity and ordered to undergo treatment at the Western State Hospital in Lakewood.

=== Indictment for murder of Krista Blake ===
On July 16, 1976, two Portland residents went to pick mushrooms and wildflowers in Tukes Mountain near Battle Ground, noticing a small brown shoe sticking out of some bushes. When the mushroomers pulled on the shoe, they saw a skeletal leg and reported the find to the local police, who unearthed the half-skeletonized body of a young woman. Forensic examination of the jaw led scientists to determine that the remains belonged to 20-year-old Krista Kay Blake, a hitchhiker who disappeared from Vancouver on July 11, 1974. Witnesses claimed that prior to Blake's disappearance, she got into a 1973 blue Ford driven by a young white male whom the witnesses did not recognize. As Forrest had the same van, he came under suspicion in not only Blake's, but the disappearances and murders of at least six teenagers and young women who had been abducted from Clark County between 1971 and 1974. Almost all of them hitchhiked and were seen entering a van before vanishing. A closer look at Blake's clothes led to the discovery of holes on her T-shirt, which investigators believed were made by a dart gun similar to the one Forrest used on the kidnapped 20-year-old woman.

During the investigation, police determined that on the day Blake had disappeared, Forrest was not working and had no alibi. His mother claimed that he had spent part of the day at her house, but left early in the evening and did not return home until the following morning. Since Blake's clothes and bones showed no signs of stab wounds or bullet holes, the medical examiner concluded that she had likely been strangled. Forrest was charged on this basis with Blake's murder in 1978. Although he had been detained at a mental institution, Forrest and his attorney Don Greig filed a petition for another examination, claiming that his mental state had improved greatly and that Forrest wanted to represent himself at trial. His request was granted, and Forrest was allowed to stand trial. Initially, four judges that had been involved with Forrest's previous trials were disqualified on the grounds of being potentially biased either in favor of or against him. This decision was eventually resolved, and Justice Robert McMullen was appointed as the trial judge.

== Trial for the murder of Blake ==
Forrest's trial began in early 1979, but a mistrial was declared after Forrest's attorney erroneously allowed a second dart gun unrelated to the case to be submitted as evidence. Forrest's defense team filed a motion for a change of venue from Clark County to Cowlitz County, arguing that the publicity surrounding the murders would prejudice the jurors against their client. The motion was granted, and the trial resumed in April 1979 at a court in Cowlitz County.

During the proceedings, Forrest pleaded not guilty, claiming that he had been on vacation to Long Beach with his wife and children. His alibi was confirmed by his mother, who said Forrest had been at home at the time when investigators supposed Blake had gotten into the van. However, prosecutors asserted that her testimony was unreliable, pointing out that she had originally told investigators that her son left the house in the early evening and did not return until the following morning. Forrest's wife Sharon also testified in his defense, although she admitted that their marriage had been rocky and that Forrest sometimes suffered from blackouts. Sharon insisted that Forrest had been with her the entire time and never showed any indication of being violent towards women.

Multiple witnesses testified against Forrest, stating that he had been seen with the victim at different times and was acquainted with her. Some of the witnesses' claims were questioned by the defense team, as two of the witnesses had given descriptions of the suspected killer's vehicle that did not match the one Forrest was using.

At one hearing, Forrest's surviving victims took the stand and identified him as their assailant. Forrest himself had pleaded guilty to the kidnapping and attempted murder of the 20-year-old woman, claiming that he had done so while under the effects of PTSD, but categorically refused to admit guilt in the murder of Blake and the kidnapping of the 15-year-old. The prosecutor's office, in turn, insisted that Forrest was guilty of all charges, as each crime matched his modus operandi. Forrest was ultimately found guilty and sentenced to life imprisonment with a chance of parole.

Following his conviction, he was transferred to the Washington State Penitentiary in Walla Walla. Forrest filed an appeal in early 1982, but it was denied in October of that year. He has filed numerous parole applications over the years, which have been unsuccessful due to the fact he was a suspect in other violent crimes.

== Serial murder accusations ==
Since his initial convictions, Forrest has remained a suspect in multiple kidnappings, disappearances and murders committed in Clark County during the early-1970s. He has refused to cooperate with investigators. In 2017, at another parole hearing, Forrest confessed to murdering Krista Blake and to the initial kidnappings. He stated that Blake had been deeply depressed at the time of her murder, as well as severely stressed and suffering from the effects of a mental illness, and claimed that he did not intend to kill her at first, but eventually did so because she attempted to escape. He also candidly confessed to a total of 16 crimes involving women between 1971 and 1974, ranging from voyeurism to murder. In spite of this, he claimed that he had killed nobody else besides Blake, and that he was remorseful for his actions. Despite his admissions, his application was denied and he was prohibited from filing further appeals until March 2022. The Parole Board stated that he continued to pose a danger to society and made minimal progress in ameliorating his behavior.

=== Trial and conviction for the murder of Martha Morrison ===
In December 2019, Forrest was charged with the murder of 17-year-old Martha Morrison, who went missing from Portland, Oregon in September 1974. Her skeletal remains were discovered on October 12, 1974, in Clark County, eight miles from Tukes Mountain, where Krista Blake's body was found; however, authorities at the time were unable to positively identify Morrison and she was known simply as a Jane Doe. In 2010, Morrison's half-brother submitted a DNA sample to police in Eugene, Oregon. In 2014, investigators began examining physical evidence from Forrest's criminal case to determine if it could be used in unsolved crimes.

Forensic experts from the Washington State Police Crime Lab isolated a partial DNA profile from bloodstains found on Forrest's dart gun and cross-referenced it with Morrison's DNA, leading to the positive identification of Morrison's remains. Consequently, Forrest was identified as Morrison's killer. In January 2020, Forrest was extradited back to Clark County to await charges in Morrison's murder. On February 7, 2020, he pleaded not guilty. The trial was scheduled to begin on April 6, but was delayed several times due to the COVID-19 pandemic. The trial resumed in early 2023, and on February 1, a jury found Forrest guilty of Morrison's murder. Sixteen days later, he received another life sentence.

== Suspected victims ==
Besides Blake and Morrison, Forrest remains the prime suspect in the disappearances and murders of at least five teenagers and young women. In each case, the perpetrator exhibited a similar modus operandi to Forrest:

- Jamie Rochelle Grissim (16) was a student at Fort Vancouver High School who disappeared while walking home from school on December 7, 1971. During the subsequent search for her, policemen found a number of her personal belongings, including her purse and an ID card, in Dole Valley. It was initially believed that she ran away and left the state, but she has not been seen since. Since Morrison was later found buried not far from where her personal belongings were found, local authorities have reassessed their conclusions and now believed that Grissim was abducted and killed by Forrest.
- Barbara Ann Derry (18) went missing on February 11, 1972. She was last seen on a highway trying to hitchhike from Vancouver to Goldendale, where she had moved to attend college. Her body was discovered on March 29 at the bottom of a silo inside the Cedar Creek Grist Mill. Derry had died from a stab wound to her chest area. Coincidentally, Derry's body was found near the area where a large manhunt had been underway for "D. B. Cooper", an unidentified skyjacker who parachuted from a plane with a $200,000 ransom and whose ultimate fate remains unknown despite extensive investigations.
- Diane Gilchrist (14) went missing on May 29, 1974. A ninth grade student at the Shumway Junior High School who had never exhibited problematic behavior, Gilchrist's parents claimed that she had left their home in downtown Vancouver through her bedroom window on the second floor and then vanished into the night. She has never been found, and her fate remains unclear.
- Gloria Nadine Knutson (19) was last seen on May 31, 1974. A senior at Hudson's Bay High School, Knutson had been invited to a housewarming party but declined, opting to instead visit a downtown Vancouver nightclub called "the Red Caboose", where she was seen by several acquaintances. One witness told police that Knutson sought his help in the early morning, claiming that somebody had attempted to rape her and was now stalking her. The man claimed that she had asked him to drive her home, but his car was out of gas. Distraught, Knutson decided to walk home and disappeared soon after. Her skeletal remains were discovered by a fisherman in a forested area near Lacamas Lake on May 9, 1978.
- Carol Platt Valenzuela (20) went missing on August 4, 1974, while hitchhiking from Camas to Vancouver. A married mother of two infant children, she was not known to be involved in prostitution or to have a criminal record. On October 12, her skeletal remains were discovered by a hunter in the Dole Valley outside of Vancouver, very close to those of Morrison. Due to this, authorities believe that Forrest likely killed both.
