= Murder of Debra Jackson =

Formerly unidentified 1979 murder victim

Debra Jackson
- Undated photograph of Debra Jackson
- Born: Debra Louise Jackson; September 20, 1956; Harris County, Texas, U.S.
- Disappeared: c. 1977; Abilene, Texas, U.S.
- Status: Identified August 6, 2019
- Died: October 30 or 31, 1979 (aged 23)
- Cause of death: Murder by strangulation
- Body discovered: Georgetown, Texas, U.S.
- Resting place: Odd Fellows Cemetery, Georgetown, Texas
- Other name: "Orange Socks"
- Known for: Formerly unidentified decedent
- Height: Between 5 ft 6 in (1.68 m) and 5 ft 7 in (1.70 m) (approximate)

Murder of Debra Jackson
- Location: Georgetown, Texas, U.S.
- Date: October 30 or 31, 1979
- Attack type: Murder by strangulation, rape
- Victims: Debra Louise Jackson, aged 23
- Perpetrator: Disputed
- Verdict: Guilty
- Convictions: Capital murder
- Sentence: Death; commuted to life imprisonment
- Convicted: Henry Lee Lucas

Debra Louise Jackson (September 20, 1956 – October 30 or 31, 1979), informally known as "Orange Socks" when unidentified, was an American murder victim who went unidentified for nearly 40 years before being identified through a DNA match with her surviving sister in 2019. Her murder is believed to have taken place on October 30 or 31, 1979 in Georgetown, Texas. Her body was found naked except for the pair of orange socks from which the nickname was derived. She had been strangled and was believed to have died only hours before the discovery.

Henry Lee Lucas confessed to her murder and was convicted. Although doubts have been raised about his complicity in this crime, Lucas's conviction was not overturned. His death sentence was commuted by Texas governor George W. Bush in 1998, and Lucas died in prison in 2001. Strong evidence exists indicating that Lucas was in Florida when Jackson was murdered.

== Evidence and physical description ==
Jackson, who had been sexually assaulted, was found in a culvert on Interstate 35. The cause of death was ruled as strangulation, as a large amount of bruising was visible on her neck. Other visible bruises were caused when her body was dropped from the overpass after being dragged through a patch of grass. Blood stains were also present at the scene. The victim was initially estimated to be in her twenties. Police suspected a connection with several other murders that had occurred along the same highway in Travis County, Texas.

Jackson's legs were unshaven, with a large number of insect bites. She had long toenails, her fingernails were painted and a hairline scar was observed beneath her chin. Her earlobes were noted to be "unique" and her toes were noted to be longer than average. Despite her injuries, she had not broken any bones during her life. She had reportedly suffered from salpingitis resulting from gonorrhea. She had ten-inch-long brown hair with a reddish tint and hazel eyes. Her age was estimated to be within the range of 15 to 30 years. She was approximately 5'8" to 5'10" tall and weighed between 140 and 160 pounds. Two of her teeth were missing, but the remainder were well-maintained, although they showed little sign of dental treatment. A silver ring was found on her hand containing an abalone or mother of pearl stone. Her ears were pierced.

A towel was found at the scene, which she may have used as a makeshift sanitary napkin. A matchbook found at the scene bore the name of a Henryetta, Oklahoma hotel, supporting the theory that she had been a hitchhiker or drifter. Investigators searched the hotel's registration records but did not discover any possible leads regarding the victim's identity.

== Confession by Henry Lee Lucas ==
In 1983, suspected serial killer Henry Lee Lucas confessed to Jackson's murder, although no physical evidence existed to prove that he had been involved in any way. In an interview, he stated that he had met Jackson in Oklahoma, where they had sex. When he asked her for sex again while he was driving, she attempted to leave his car, and Lucas then killed her and sexually violated her corpse. He then drove her body to Georgetown. Lucas told authorities that the victim's name was "Joanie" or "Judy." When transported by authorities to the location where the body was found, he demonstrated how he had supposedly dragged her body over the guardrail.

One report claims that at the time of Jackson's murder, Lucas was working in Florida, although the murder occurred in Texas. He contradicted himself repeatedly when confessing to the murder, and his defense team stated that he was shown images of the crime scene before his interview. In order to have traveled from Florida to Oklahoma, then to Texas and back to Florida, it was estimated that he would have had to drive at an average of 70 miles per hour without stopping, which many find unlikely. Lucas recanted his confession after his conviction in 1984. Texas governor George W. Bush, citing lingering doubts about Lucas's guilt, commuted his death sentence to life imprisonment. As Jackson's murder was the only conviction for which Lucas had received the death penalty, his life was spared. He had a history of dubious confessions, which led many to doubt his word (he confessed to as many as 3,000 murders). After his recantation, Lucas stated that the only murder that he had committed was that of his mother Viola, though he had previously been able to lead the police to the bodies of two other victims.

== Media appearances and further investigation ==
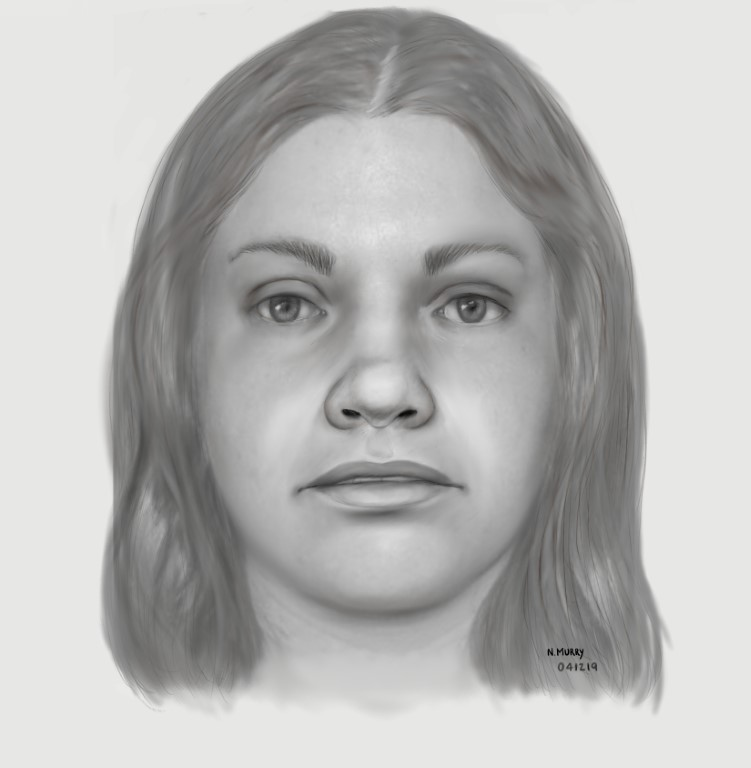
Contemporary reconstruction of Jackson based on mortuary photographs, created prior to her identification

In 2001, a missing woman's photograph surfaced that resembled the victim, but DNA testing did not match. Another media report suggested that "Orange Socks" was a woman who had disappeared in the 1970s with her abusive boyfriend. There had been speculation that the victim was Martha Morrison, but in 2015, Morrison's remains were identified as a Jane Doe found in Washington in the same year in which she had disappeared. Several other missing women were also excluded.

The "Orange Socks" case was featured twice on the television series America's Most Wanted. An anonymous woman phoned the program to report having seen "Orange Socks" hitchhiking on the day of her murder, but the lead did not generate any new information.

In 2016, on the 37th anniversary of her discovery, new sketches of "Orange Socks" were released by the National Center for Missing & Exploited Children. The organization also entered her into its database.

In May 2018, law-enforcement officials announced that they were examining the victim's ring and running tests to identify where the victim's socks were made.

By January 2019, it was announced that DNA from Jackson's socks contained the profiles of two or more males. DNA was also recovered from her fingernails and pubic hair.

=== Identification ===
In August 2019, "Orange Socks" was identified as Debra Jackson after the DNA Doe Project identified a potential cousin of the unknown victim. A revised sketch had also caught the attention of Jackson's sister. Members of Jackson's family identified her based on morgue photographs and physical characteristics. When DNA submitted by Jackson's sister was tested, the results confirmed that she was related to the victim. Jackson was last seen around 1977 and had never been reported missing. Further investigation found that Jackson had worked at a Ramada hotel in Amarillo, Texas and Bur-Mont (an assisted living facility) in Azle, Texas in 1978. Law enforcement also believed that she had worked at a real-estate company in 1979.

Many other details about Jackson's life remain unclear, but it is known that she attended school locally and may have used the surnames "Moon" and "Larned."

== See also ==
- List of solved missing person cases (1970s)
- List of unsolved murders (1900–1979)
- Murder of Sherri Jarvis, a formerly unidentified female found a year and one day later in Huntsville, Texas
