= Henry Lee Lucas =

American murderer (1936–2001)

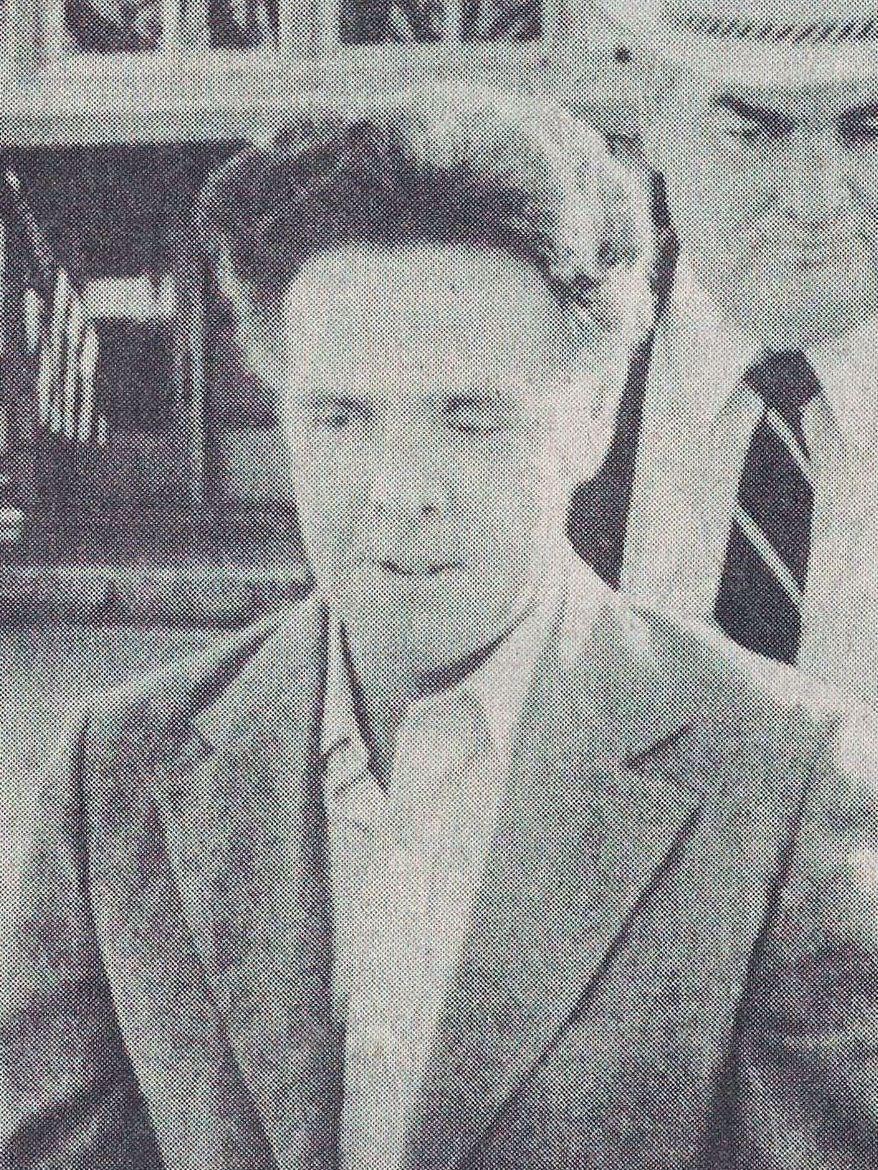
- Lucas in 1984
- Born: August 23, 1936; Blacksburg, Virginia, U.S.
- Died: March 12, 2001 (aged 64); Ellis Unit, Huntsville, Texas, U.S.
- Conviction: Capital murder
- Penalty: Death; commuted to life imprisonment

Details
- Victims: 3 confirmed 250+ claimed
- Span of crimes: 1960–1983
- Country: United States
- States: Michigan and Texas
- Date apprehended: June 11, 1983

Henry Lee Lucas (August 23, 1936 – March 12, 2001), also known as the Confession Killer, was an American murderer and serial killer who was convicted of murdering his mother in 1960 and two others in 1983. He rose to infamy as a claimed serial killer while incarcerated for these crimes, falsely confessing to approximately 600 other murders to the Texas Rangers and other law enforcement officials. Many unsolved cases were closed based on the confessions and the murders officially attributed to Lucas. He was convicted of murdering eleven people and condemned to death for a single case with a then-unidentified victim, later identified as Debra Jackson.

An investigation by the Dallas Times-Herald showed that it was impossible for Lucas to have committed many of the murders he confessed to. While the Texas Rangers defended their work, a follow-up investigation by the Attorney General of Texas concluded Lucas was a fabulist who had falsely confessed. Lucas' death sentence was commuted to life imprisonment in 1998. Lucas later recanted his confessions as a hoax with the exception of his confession to murdering his mother. He died of congestive heart failure in 2001.

Lucas' case damaged the reputation of the Texas Rangers, caused a re-evaluation in police techniques and created greater awareness of the possibility of false confessions. Investigators did not consider that the apparently trivial comforts such as steak dinners, milkshakes and access to television in return for "confessions" to crimes of extreme seriousness might encourage prisoners such as Lucas, who had little to lose, to make false confessions. Investigators also let Lucas see the case files so he could "refresh his memory", making it easy to seemingly demonstrate knowledge of facts that only the perpetrator would know. Police also did not record their interviews, making it impossible to know for sure how much information interviewers gave Lucas unprompted.

== Early life and criminal history ==
=== Background ===
Henry Lee Lucas was born in a one-room log cabin in Blacksburg, Virginia, on August 23, 1936. His mother, Nellie Viola Lucas, was a member of the Chippewa tribe and an alcoholic who had seven children; Henry and another son were supposedly fathered by Anderson Lucas, a double amputee who lost his legs in a freight train accident and was nicknamed "No-Legs". "My daddy didn't do anything," Lucas later said. "He just sold pencils." However, as Lucas' mother was a prostitute, his father has been characterized as her pimp. She would sometimes force her sons and husband to watch her having sex with her clients. "First thing I can remember was when my mom was in bed with another man in the house, and she made me watch it," Lucas recalled. "I just couldn't stand there and watch. I had to turn my back and walk out of the house, and after I did that, she beat me, 'cause I didn't watch it."

When he was eight years old, Lucas was beaten by his mother across the head with a wooden plank, which caused him to spend three days in a coma. At age 10, Lucas developed an infection in his left eye after one of his brothers struck him with a knife. His mother ignored the injury for several days until a teacher swiped him over his eye with a steel-tipped ruler, and the eyeball burst and had to be surgically removed. It was replaced with a glass prosthetic. Both of these traumas to Lucas' head have led examining medical experts to conclude that these caused brain damage, later evidenced with CT scans showing "small abnormalities in the frontal lobes, temporal lobes and in the parts of the brain that are related to emotional control," while other medical examiners have concluded that problems with his corpus callosum played a role in his aberrant behavior and personality.

Lucas' mother would also make him cross-dress in public, purportedly so she could later pimp him to both men and women. Eventually, Lucas' teachers complained about the cross-dressing, and a court order put an end to it. Despite this, Lucas' mother continued to abuse and torment him. She shot and killed a mule given to him by an uncle and proceeded to beat Lucas because she had to pay to have the animal carcass removed.

Lucas was frequently bullied as a child and later cited the mass rejection by his peers as a cause for his misanthropy. Commenting on his childhood, he stated:

I hated all my life. I hated everybody. When I first grew up and can remember, I was dressed as a girl by my mother. And I stayed that way for two or three years. And after that I was treated like what I call the dog of the family. I was beaten. I was made to do things that no human bein' would want to do.

Lucas' father died of pneumonia after spending a night outside in the cold. While in the sixth grade, Lucas dropped out of school and ran away from home, drifting around Virginia. As an adolescent, Lucas began an incestuous relationship with his half-brother and started engaging in bestiality, capturing small animals and performing sexual acts on them before killing them.

=== First alleged murder ===
Lucas claimed to have committed his first homicide at age 14, when he strangled seventeen-year-old Laura Everlean Burnsley. Burnsley disappeared from a bus stop in Lynchburg, Virginia, in March 1951; Lucas confessed to her murder on February 15, 1984. According to Lucas, he picked her up near Lynchburg, and after she refused his sexual advances and resisted an unsuccessful rape attempt, he killed her and buried her body in a secluded wooded area near Harrisburg.

"It scared me quite a bit," Lucas said. "Because the first girl I killed was when I was 14 years old. I wanted to try the sex I'd been watching.... I got to playing too rough with her. The pressure of seeing my mom hit me — and my emotions more or less took over, and I couldn't quite handle it." As with most of his confessions, Lucas later retracted this claim. Burnsley has never been found.

=== Matricide ===
In late 1959, Lucas traveled to Tecumseh, Michigan, to live with his half-sister, Opal Retta Jennings. Around this time, he was engaged to marry a pen pal, Stella Curtis, with whom he had corresponded while incarcerated. When Lucas' mother, now aged 71, visited him for Christmas, she disapproved of her son's fiancée and insisted he move back to Blacksburg to take care of her as she grew older. He refused, and they argued repeatedly. These arguments escalated until January 11, 1960, when she struck him over the head with a broom, at which point he stabbed her in the neck. "I was pretty well drunk when she started arguing with me, wanting me to go back to live with her to Virginia, but I told her I didn't want nothing to do with her," Lucas remembered, later elaborating that he slapped her "neck, but after I did that I saw her fall.... I realized she was dead. Then I noticed that I had my knife in my hand and she had been cut." Lucas then fled.

When Opal returned to the home, she discovered their mother was still alive on the bedroom floor, in a pool of her own blood. Opal called an ambulance, but it arrived too late. The official police report stated that Lucas' mother died of a heart attack precipitated by the assault. Lucas was arrested in Ohio on the outstanding Michigan warrant. He claimed to have killed his mother in self-defense and stated, "I've got gashes in the back of my head. I've got black and blue marks on my body from being beaten every day. If I didn't do something she wanted, I got beaten." However, Lucas' claim was rejected, and he was found guilty of second-degree murder and sentenced to up to forty years' imprisonment at Jackson State Penitentiary.

Lucas attempted suicide several times by slashing his wrists and stomach with a razor. He was then transferred to the Ionia State Hospital, where he was subjected to electric shock therapy, behavior therapy and heavy doses of antidepressants. Lucas spent four years at Ionia State Hospital before returning to prison in 1966, where a social worker met him while he was incarcerated and described him as "a very inadequate individual with feelings of insecurity and inferiority." After serving ten years in prison, Lucas was released on June 3, 1970, due to prison overcrowding.

== Murders ==
=== Claimed killing spree ===
Lucas and Ottis Toole in prison during the early 1980s after the time they were romantically involved.

In December 1971, Lucas was charged and sentenced to four or five years in prison for attempting to abduct a fifteen-year-old girl at gunpoint. He was also in violation of his probation by having a handgun in his possession. While serving his sentence for the crime, Lucas established a relationship with a family friend and widow of a cousin, Betty Crawford, who had written to him. After being released from prison in August 1975, he moved to Port Deposit, Maryland, and married Crawford; he moved in with her and her two daughters in Pennsylvania on December 5, 1975, and began working at a mushroom farm. Their marriage ended in 1976 when Betty accused Lucas of molesting her daughters.

Lucas relocated to Jacksonville, Florida, in 1976. At a soup kitchen, he befriended Ottis Elwood Toole, a drifter and occasional transvestite. In 1978, Lucas moved in with Toole and the latter's mother in Springfield, Florida, and became close to Toole's niece, eleven-year-old Frieda Lorraine "Becky" Powell, who had mild intellectual disability and had escaped from a juvenile detention center. A period of stability followed, with Lucas and Toole working together in a roofing company between 1979 and 1981.

According to Lucas, he and Toole engaged in a multi-state killing spree during this period, in which they targeted hitchhikers, sex workers and migrants. Lucas also claimed that Toole enjoyed crucifying their victims, then barbecuing and eating them. After their arrest, the two men were caught discussing cannibalism over a prison phone. "Remember how I liked to pour some blood out of them?" Toole asked Lucas. "Some tastes like real meat when it's got barbecue sauce on it." Powell would also occasionally travel with the men, and may have even helped Lucas and Toole lure potential victims. When interviewed about his crime spree, Lucas stated:

I killed 'em every way there is except poison. There's been strangulations, there's been knifings, there's been shootings, there's been hit-and-runs... I didn't have any [emotions]... I had no feelings for the people themselves, or any of my crimes... I'd pick them up hitchhiking, running and playing, stuff like that. We'd get to going and having a good time. First thing you know, I'd killed her and throwed her out somewhere. I don't know how to really explain why I kept on. It was just, like I say, as though I left my body. And just as though the more you look at them, as though that person wasn't dead. And you just keep stabbing them and imagining that person's not dying.

=== Arrest, confession to murders of Powell and Rich ===
On January 20, 1982, Lucas convinced Powell to run away with him to avoid child welfare authorities. They lived as nomads, eventually traveling to California, where an employer's wife asked them to work for her infirm mother, 82-year-old Katie Pearl Rich. Three weeks later, Rich went missing, as were Lucas and Powell. Rich's relatives admonished Lucas and Powell for failing to do their jobs and for writing checks on Rich's bank account.

While hitchhiking, Lucas and Powell were picked up by the minister of a Pentecostal commune called the House of Prayer, located in Stoneburg, Texas. Believing Lucas and the fifteen-year-old Powell were a married couple, the minister found Lucas a job as a roofer while allowing the couple to stay in a small apartment on the commune while they attended church services. However, Powell became argumentative and homesick for Florida. Lucas explained her absence by claiming that she left at a truck stop in Bowie, Texas.

On June 10, 1983, Lucas was arrested on charges of unlawful possession of a firearm by Texas Ranger Phil Ryan. While in jail, Lucas wrote a letter to the sheriff: "I have killed for the past 10 years and no one will believe me. I cannot go on doing this. I also killed the only girl I ever loved." He later confessed to the murders of Powell and Rich. Lucas claimed he had lured Powell to an isolated field in Denton, Texas, on August 23, 1982, stabbed her in the chest, engaged in necrophilia with her corpse before he dismembered and decapitated her, finally scattering the pieces of her body. In Ringgold, Texas, on September 16, 1982, Lucas reportedly lured Rich to join him in a search for Powell on a camping ground. He then stabbed her in the chest, killing her, then carved an inverted cross on her chest and had sex with her corpse before stuffing her body into a drainage pipe.

Lucas led police to their purported remains. However, forensic evidence alone was inconclusive, and the coroner was unable to positively identify either corpse. Lucas' participation in the investigation would serve to boost his credibility in later confessions to other crimes. Lucas later denied involvement, but the consensus is that he did murder Powell and Rich.

=== False confession spree ===
In November 1983, Lucas was transferred to a jail in Williamson County, Texas. He reported that he attempted suicide after receiving rough treatment by the inmates. He also claimed that police stripped him naked, denied him cigarettes and bedding, held him in a cold cell, mutilated his genitalia and prevented him from contacting an attorney. After four days in jail, Lucas pleaded guilty to the murders of Powell and Rich, and also claimed to have committed over a hundred additional murders. In interviews with law enforcement personnel, Lucas confessed to numerous additional unsolved killings. It was thought that there was positive corroboration with Lucas' confessions in twenty-eight unsolved murders, so the Lucas Task Force was established by James B. Adams, the director of the Texas Department of Public Safety.

The task force officially cleared hundreds of previously unsolved homicides as a result of Lucas' confessions. Lucas received preferential treatment that was extremely lax for someone supposedly thought to be a mass murderer: he was frequently taken to restaurants and cafés, rarely handcuffed, allowed to wander police stations and jails and even given codes to security doors. Later attempts at determining Lucas' involvement in his confessed crimes were complicated when it was discovered he had been given access to information in the files of cases he was confessing to. There were suggestions that the interview tapes showed that Lucas would read the reactions of those interviewing him and alter what he was saying, thereby making his confessions more consistent with facts known to law enforcement.

=== Discredited ===
Journalist Hugh Aynesworth and others investigated the veracity of Lucas' claims for articles that appeared in the Dallas Times-Herald. They calculated that Lucas would have had to use his thirteen-year-old Ford station wagon to cover 11,000 miles (17,700 kilometres) in one month to have committed all the crimes police attributed to him. After the story appeared in April 1985 and revealed the flawed methods of the Lucas Task Force, law enforcement opinion began to turn against the claims that crimes had been solved.

The bulk of the Lucas Report was devoted to a detailed timeline of Lucas' claimed murders. The report compared his claims to reliable, verifiable sources for his whereabouts; the results often contradicted his confessions, thus casting doubt on his participation in most of the crimes he had confessed to. Texas Attorney General Jim Mattox wrote that "when Lucas was confessing to hundreds of murders, those with custody of Lucas did nothing to bring an end to this hoax ... we have found information that would lead us to believe that some officials 'cleared cases' just to get them off the books."

Lucas' case damaged the reputation of the Texas Rangers, caused a re-evaluation in police techniques and created greater awareness of the possibility of false confessions. Investigators did not consider that the apparently trivial comforts such as steak dinners, milkshakes and access to television in return for "confessions" to crimes of extreme seriousness might encourage prisoners such as Lucas, who had little to lose, to make false confessions. Investigators also let Lucas see the case files so he could "refresh his memory", making it easy to seemingly demonstrate knowledge of facts that only the perpetrator would know. Police also did not record their interviews, making it impossible to know for sure how much information interviewers accidentally gave Lucas unprompted.

=== Incarceration and death ===
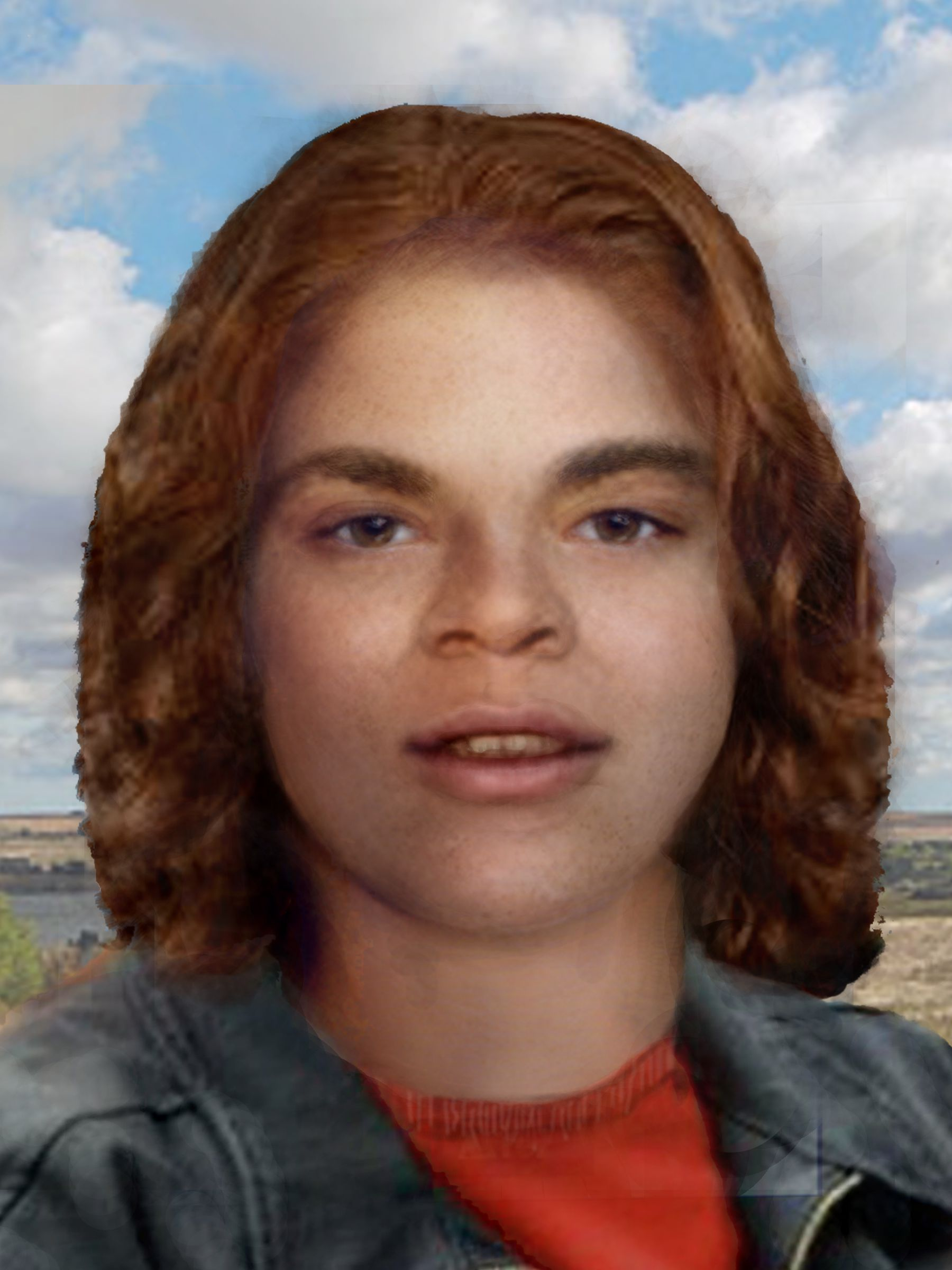
Reconstruction of "Orange Socks", created prior to her official 2019 identification as Debra Jackson, which conjectured how she may have looked when she was alive.

Lucas was ultimately convicted of eleven homicides, including those of his mother along with Powell and Rich. He had been sentenced to death for one, a then-unidentified woman dubbed as "Orange Socks", whose body was found in Williamson County on Halloween 1979, despite a time sheet showing his presence at work in Jacksonville, Florida, on that day. Lucas was granted a stay on his death sentence after it was discovered that details in his confession came from the case file that he had been given to read. The sentence was commuted to life imprisonment in 1998 by then-Governor George W. Bush, the only death sentence he commuted in his time as governor.

On March 12, 2001, at 11:00 p.m., Lucas was found dead in prison from congestive heart failure at age 64. He is buried at Captain Joe Byrd Cemetery in Huntsville, Texas.

== Victims ==
=== Differing opinions ===
Lucas' credibility was damaged by his lack of precision: he initially admitted to having killed sixty people, a number he raised to over 100 victims, which police accepted, and then to a figure of 600 that led to him not being taken seriously. DNA evidence has verified that Lucas did not kill twenty of his supposed victims. Of more than three thousand murder cases in which he was a suspect, police believed more than two hundred were committed by him. However, he remained publicized as America's most prolific serial killer, despite denials such as, "I am not a serial killer."

Some continue to believe, nonetheless, that Lucas was responsible for a large number of killings. Criminologist Eric Hickey cites an unnamed "investigator" who interviewed Lucas several times and concluded that he had probably killed about forty people. Such assertions were given little credence, with the law enforcement involved refusing to corroborate these claims. An experienced Texas Ranger that Ryan's team allowed access to Lucas said that although it was obvious to him that Lucas often lied, there was an instance where he demonstrated guilty knowledge. "I remember him trying to cop to one he didn't do, but there was another murder case where I'll kiss your butt if he didn't lead us right to the deer stand where the murder took place. Ain't no way he could've guessed that, and I damn sure didn't tell him. I think he did that one." Other Rangers had similar experiences with Lucas.

=== Convicted ===
In total, Lucas was convicted of eleven murders: the deaths of Viola Lucas, Becky Powell and Kate Rich, as well as:

- Schoolteacher Linda Jane Phillips (26) disappeared on August 8, 1970, in Richardson, Texas (a suburb of Dallas), while returning from a party to her parents' home in Kaufman County. Her mutilated body was found on August 10. She sustained twenty-six stab wounds and had been sexually abused. Lucas confessed to the murder and claimed he forced Phillips' car off the road at about 2:30 a.m. He then allegedly forced her into his car at gunpoint, made her disrobe and then stabbed her in the throat, chest and stomach.
- The body of Patrolman Clemmie Everett Curtis (30) was found on August 3, 1976, handcuffed near his patrol car in a wooded area just outside of the Huntington, West Virginia, city limit. He had been shot once through the chest. Lucas confessed that he and Toole had killed Curtis.
- Lillie Pearl Darty (18) accepted a ride from Lucas on November 11, 1977, at a gas station in Harrison County, Texas, and later was sexually assaulted and shot in the head. Her decomposing body was found three weeks later in a wooded area north of Marshall.
- Debra Louise Jackson (23), informally known as "Orange Socks" when unidentified, is believed to have been murdered on October 30 or 31, 1979, in Georgetown, Texas. Her body was found naked, except for the pair of orange socks from which the nickname was derived. She had been strangled, and was believed to have died only hours before her discovery.
- On April 26, 1981, Lucas allegedly broke into the apartment of Dianna Lynn Bryant (17) in Brownfield, Texas, with the intent of robbing it. He then took a knife he carried to cut the cord on a vacuum cleaner, using it to strangle Bryant. Bryant's father was satisfied with Lucas's confession and the case was closed.
- Glenna Fay Biggers (65) was found by a neighbor on December 20, 1982, in Hale County, Texas. A butcher knife had been thrust into her stomach and a fork into her throat. According to Lucas, he broke into her home, killed her and then stole $180.
- Laura Marie Purchase (26) was discovered on March 17, 1983, in a burning wooded area near League Line Road in Montgomery County, Texas. Purchase had been reported missing from Houston on March 5. An autopsy determined that she had been sexually assaulted and strangled. In 2008, DNA testing ruled out Lucas as suspect in Purchase's case. In 2021, another man was charged with her murder.
- On April 16, 1983, Laura Jean Donez (16) skipped school in Houston and was never seen again. On April 18, an oilfield worker spotted a fire burning in a wooded area near a logging road in Montgomery County, Texas. Donez had been strangled, raped, beaten about the head and her body burned after death. Lucas confessed to Donez' murder and was able to lead police to where her body was discovered.

=== Suspected ===
Although almost all of Lucas' confessions have been discredited or entirely proven false, both he and Toole still remain credible suspects in the deaths of several women based on compelling circumstantial evidence. Cases in which they are both seen as viable suspects are as follows:

- On June 27, 1977, detectives arrived at a wooded area off of Old Union Church Road outside of Townsend, Delaware, after the remains of Marie Petry Heiser (50) were discovered in an open field. She had suffered blunt-force trauma to her head and had fought back against her assailant. Lucas lived in Elkton, Maryland, at the time near where Heiser's remains were found. Investigators also found that writings by Lucas had many similarities to the crime scene.
- Stella Ellen McLean (45) disappeared from a restaurant in Scottsbluff, Nebraska, on February 7, 1978. On April 15, her headless body was discovered near Interstate 25 in Platte County, Wyoming. She had been raped and strangled; her head was never recovered. In September 1984, Jim Larson, an investigator for the Scotts Bluff County, Nebraska, sheriff's department, questioned Lucas about Stella's murder. Larson asked deceptive questions to test Lucas, but apparently, Lucas offered compelling testimony to support his claims of killing McLean.
- Janet Lee Callies (40) was last seen at the Sandbar, a tavern near Interstate 80 in Grand Island, Nebraska, on November 15, 1978. In 1984, Lucas confessed to Callies' murder and stated that he and Toole had strangled her and buried the body "somewhere between the north edge of Grand Island and the South Dakota border." Lucas managed to recall personal details about Callies, such as that she had three children.
- 19-year-old Cheryl Anne Scherer (19) was last seen working her shift at a self-service gas station in Scott City, Missouri, on April 17, 1979, at 11:45 a.m. Toole and Lucas both admitted to authorities that they had killed and abducted a young woman nearby about the time that Scherer vanished. Scherer was the only girl reported missing in the region at the time, despite Lucas' claims to the contrary when police showed him a photo of her. Even though it was proved that Toole's niece and nephew, as well as Lucas and Toole, were present in Scott City at the time of Scherer's disappearance, there was never enough evidence to bring charges against them.
- On October 29, 1981, a highway worker discovered the body of an unidentified woman in Iola, Texas. Her cause of death was blunt force trauma to the head. The victim, known as the Grimes County Jane Doe, was wrapped in a plastic bag. Lucas confessed to her murder, stating that he drove the victim to the area from Durham, North Carolina, claiming that her name may have been Cheryl. He then strangled the woman while Toole beat her across the head with a tire iron. Lucas was able to lead police to the area in which her body had previously been found.

== Media ==
There have been several books on the Lucas case. Four narrative films have been made based on his confessions: Confessions of a Serial Killer (1985); Henry: Portrait of a Serial Killer (1986), in which the title role is played by Michael Rooker; Henry: Portrait of a Serial Killer, Part II (1996); and the 2009 film Drifter: Henry Lee Lucas. Two documentary films were released in 1995: The Serial Killers and Henry Lee Lucas: The Confession Killer. In 2019, Netflix released a five-part serialized documentary The Confession Killer focusing on the far-reaching consequences of the investigation. Wild Crime: Murder in Yosemite season two (2022) focuses on Lucas.

== See also ==
- Sture Bergwall (born 1950) a Swedish man whose "serial killer" confessions are believed to be fabricated
- Bruno Lüdke
- List of serial killers in the United States
- List of serial killers by number of victims
