= Murder of Mary Silvani =

American murder case

Mary Silvani
- Silvani in 1968
- Born: Mary Edith Silvani; September 29, 1948; Pontiac, Michigan, U.S.
- Status: Identified
- Died: July 17, 1982 (aged 33)
- Cause of death: Homicide by gunshot
- Body discovered: July 17, 1982; Lake Tahoe, Nevada, U.S.
- Resting place: Our Mother of Sorrows Catholic Cemetery, Reno, Nevada, U.S.
- Height: Over 5 ft 5 in (1.65 m)
- Parents: John Silvani (father); Blanche Silvani (mother)

Mary Edith Silvani (September 29, 1948 – July 17, 1982), known as "Sheep's Flat Jane Doe" and "Washoe County Jane Doe" while unidentified, was an American woman found shot to death near Lake Tahoe in Washoe County, Nevada in July 1982. She was unidentified for 37 years, the investigation becoming a cold case. The Washoe County Sheriff's Office announced her identity on May 7, 2019. Silvani was identified through DNA analysis and genetic genealogy with assistance from the DNA Doe Project and utilizing the public genealogy database GEDmatch.

The Sheriff's Office announced that her murderer had been confirmed as serial killer James Richard Curry.

Born in Pontiac, Michigan, Silvani was 33 when she was killed. She was the only daughter of John and Blanche Silvani, and had two brothers.

== Discovery ==
The body of a woman aged between 25 and 35 was found by hikers on July 17, 1982, in Sheep's Flat, a popular hiking area in Washoe County, Nevada, near Lake Tahoe. The woman had been sexually assaulted and shot in the back of the head as she was bending over, possibly to tie her shoes. The bullet hole on her head had been covered with men's underwear.

The victim wore a light yellow pair of tennis shoes, a sleeveless blue shirt, Lee brand jeans, and a one-piece swimsuit underneath. The shirt had been sold at stores in California, Washington and Oregon.

== Investigation ==
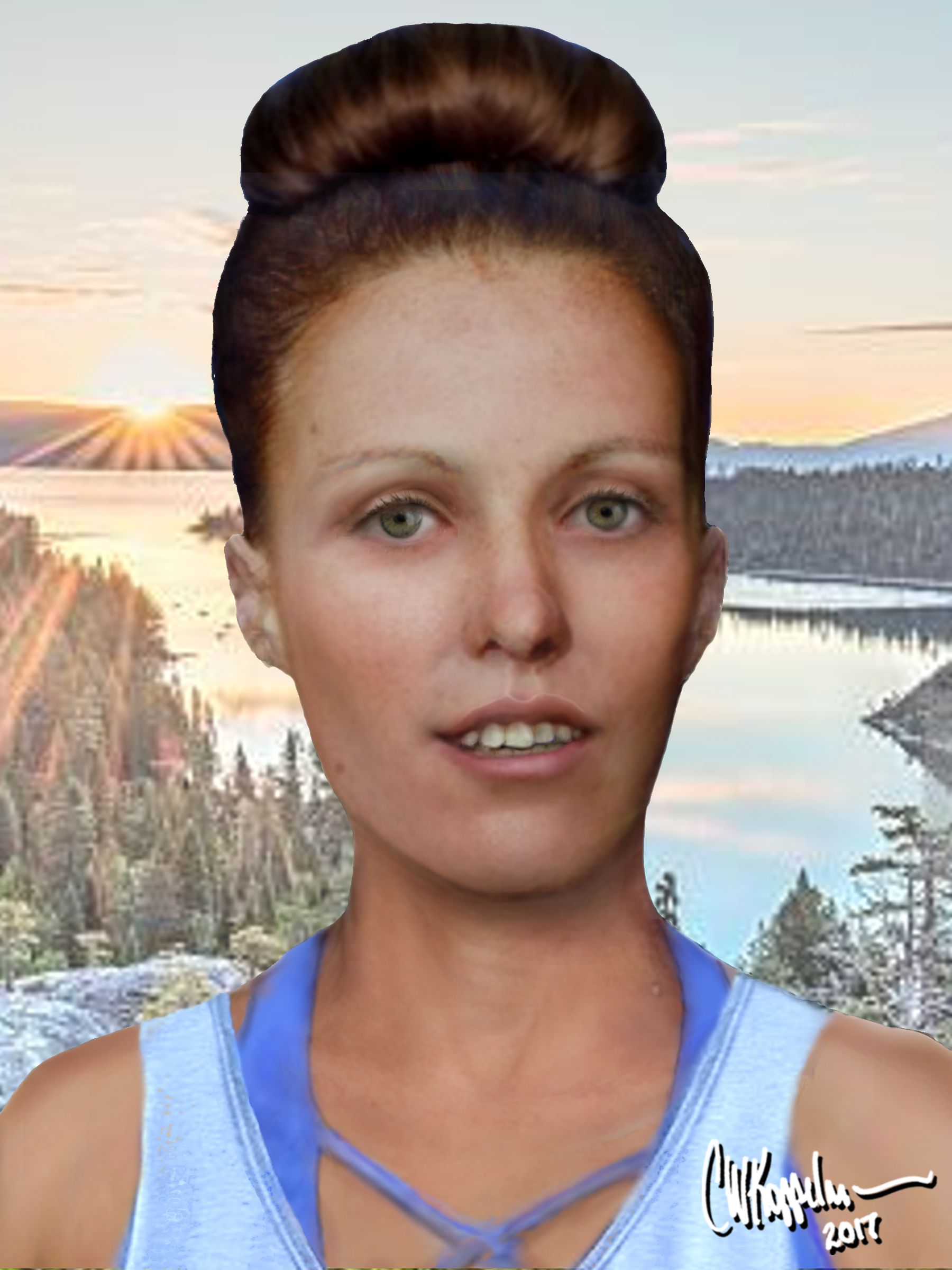
A reconstruction of Silvani by Carl Koppelman, approximating her appearance at the time she died.

At her autopsy, a vaccination scar was located on her left arm, and another on her abdomen, possibly from a Caesarean section. In addition, one of her toenails had a large bruise underneath. The woman had hazel eyes, was around 5 feet 5 inches (1.65 m) in height, weighed 112 lb (51 kg), and had brown hair tied back in a bun.

Her last meal was a salad. She was originally believed to be from Europe, due to the nature of an inoculation scar on her arm and her dental work. An independent dental examination in 2010 discredited this original assumption.

She was dressed for a day at the lake: jeans and a tee-shirt over a blue bathing suit. Close forensic inspection helped police determine the t-shirt was sold only on the West Coast of the United States, leading investigators to believe that she may have visited or had been residing in one of the Western United States before her murder.

She was buried at Our Mother of Sorrows Catholic Cemetery in Reno, Nevada.

== Identification ==
In February 2018, a Washoe County forensic investigator went to a lecture on forensic genealogy by Colleen Fitzpatrick. With the thought that this could aid in solving cold cases, the county contacted Fitzpatrick, eventually turning to both DNA Doe Project and Identifinders International to employ this new method of identifying victims and perpetrators to help solve Jane Doe's case.

In July 2018, the Washoe County Sheriff's Office announced that the victim had been tentatively identified. In September her identity was confirmed, but the police withheld it due to their open homicide investigation. Silvani's identity was further confirmed through a fingerprint kept on file by the Detroit Police Department, who had arrested her in 1974 for loitering (a misdemeanor). Her identity as Mary Edith Silvani was announced on May 7, 2019, along with the name of her killer.

Mary Edith Silvani was born in Pontiac, Michigan on September 29, 1948, and grew up in Detroit. She had two brothers, Bob and Charles, both of whom are deceased. Nancy Cumming, a friend from her high school days has published several photos of her when she was 19 and her bridesmaid. Another classmate Paula Headley, said Silvani had an affinity for art and reading, visited the Detroit Institute of Arts frequently, was quiet and kind-hearted, and never talked about her family.

The 1966 Mackenzie High School yearbook has a photo of her, but the school has no record of her graduating, and she did not have a senior photo taken. After her father died when she was 16, she became homeless. Her mother had left her when she was a child and spent much of her life in mental institutions; relatives say she died in 1980. Silvani's closest living relative is believed to be her nephew, Robert Silvani Jr., who never met her. She had a child who she gave up for adoption about 1972.

Silvani moved to California sometime between 1974 and 1982, but investigators have been unable to locate anyone who knew her.

== Perpetrator ==
Not long after the victim was identified, Identifinders International, led by Colleen Fitzpatrick, identified James Richard Curry as the man believed to be Silvani's murderer.

Curry was arrested January 6, 1983 as a suspect in another murder. He confessed to two more murders to police. He committed suicide in the Santa Clara County, California jail a day after his arrest. He is a suspect in a fourth murder.

As of May 2019, Silvani's case is considered closed. It is the first known case in which both the victim and perpetrator were identified through the use of investigative genetic genealogy.

== See also ==
- List of homicides in Nevada
- List of serial killers in the United States
