= Colleen M. Fitzpatrick =

American forensic genealogist and physicist (born 1955)

- Born: April 25, 1955 (age 71); New Orleans, Louisiana, U.S.
- Citizenship: American
- Alma mater: Rice University (BA); Duke University (MA, PhD)
- Occupations: Forensic genealogist, physicist, entrepreneur
- Known for: Forensic genealogy; Co-founding the DNA Doe Project; Identifying the Somerton Man; Identifying a victim of Northwest Airlines Flight 4422
- Partner: Andrew Yeiser (died 2016)
- Awards: Fellow of SPIE (2007); AFDIL Service Medal (2007); U.S. Marshals Citizen of the Year (2019)
- Scientific career
- Fields: Nuclear physics, optics, genetic genealogy
- Workplaces: Rice Systems, Inc.; Identifinders International; DNA Doe Project; Intermountain Forensics
- Thesis: (1983)
- Website: identifinders.com

Colleen M. Fitzpatrick (born April 25, 1955) is an American forensic genealogist, physicist and entrepreneur. A nuclear physicist by training, she ran an optics company before moving into genealogy in 2005 with her book Forensic Genealogy, and she is credited with coining the term "forensic genealogy".

Fitzpatrick founded and runs Identifinders International, a firm that uses DNA and genealogical research to help investigators identify suspects and victims in cold cases. In 2017 she co-founded the DNA Doe Project with Margaret Press. Her work includes identifying a victim of the 1948 crash of Northwest Airlines Flight 4422 in Alaska, some of the earliest uses of genetic genealogy in criminal investigations, the 2022 identification of Philadelphia's "Boy in the Box" as Joseph Augustus Zarelli, and, with Derek Abbott, the 2022 identification of the Somerton Man as Carl "Charles" Webb.

== Early life and education ==
Fitzpatrick was born in New Orleans, Louisiana, and grew up in the city's Lakeview neighborhood. She attended an all-girls Catholic school and pursued science through competitions, including a summer program in Baton Rouge sponsored by the National Science Foundation. For her school science fair she ran an experiment on the Benham disk. The project made her one of ten national winners of the Tomorrow's Scientists and Engineers award, sponsored by Humble Oil, which brought $6,000 toward her college tuition. She is also an alumna of the 1972 Science Talent Search.

She graduated from Rice University with a BA in physics in 1976. She went on to Duke University, where she earned an MA and, in 1983, a PhD in nuclear physics.

== Career ==
=== Physics and optics ===
After her doctorate, Fitzpatrick taught physics at Sam Houston State University for two years. In 1984 she moved to California to join Rockwell International, where she designed laser radar systems for the Strategic Defense Initiative. At Spectron Development Laboratories she was principal investigator on a NASA laser that flew on the Space Shuttle, until she was laid off in 1989.

In 1989 she founded Rice Systems, Inc., a laser diagnostics company that she started in her garage and named after her mother. The company developed high-resolution laser measurement techniques under contracts with NASA, the National Science Foundation, DARPA and the Department of Defense, and grew to ten employees. Rice Systems was working with NASA on a spacecraft bound for Jupiter when, in 2005, the Bush administration redirected the funding to a return mission to the Moon. The company folded that year.

=== Forensic genealogy ===
Fitzpatrick turned to genealogical research in 2005, when she published Forensic Genealogy. The Society for Science describes the book as formally establishing the field. Her early cases were historical and missing-person investigations, because forensic genetic genealogy did not emerge as a distinct discipline until 2018.

Forensic genealogy has traditionally relied mainly on documentary research in public records, historical documents and family connections. Forensic genetic genealogy (also called investigative genetic genealogy) adds DNA analysis to that research to generate investigative leads. It compares hundreds of thousands of single-nucleotide polymorphisms (SNPs) from an unknown sample against genetic genealogy databases, looking for people who share DNA segments with it.

Fitzpatrick has lectured in the United States, Canada, Europe, Australia and New Zealand, has researched cases in more than 50 countries, and specializes in international cases. She is multilingual.

In 2021 Fitzpatrick was named director of forensic genetic genealogy at Intermountain Forensics, a nonprofit forensic laboratory.

=== Identifinders International ===
In 2006 Fitzpatrick traced to Taipei the former owners of a Florida house that had gone into escrow over unpaid back taxes. The case began her collaboration with Andrew Yeiser, an engineering and business management consultant, with whom she co-founded Identifinders International. The company was operating by 2010; later accounts date its formal founding to 2011 or 2012. It helps law enforcement agencies and members of the public with cold cases, the identification of unknown people and searches for living people. Fitzpatrick is its founder and president. Identifinders carried out the DNA work for the first case taken on by the Porchlight Project, an Ohio nonprofit that funds genealogy research in cold cases.

=== DNA Doe Project ===
In early 2017 Fitzpatrick and genealogist Margaret Press co-founded the DNA Doe Project, a 501(c)(3) nonprofit that uses forensic genetic genealogy to identify John and Jane Does. They chose to focus on unidentified remains partly to avoid the controversy of using relatives' DNA to find criminal suspects. Fitzpatrick was the project's co-executive director from 2017 until 2020.

The project's first identification, made in March 2018, was that of Joseph Newton Chandler III, a man who had lived under a stolen identity and died by suicide in Ohio in 2002. U.S. Marshal Pete Elliott had asked Fitzpatrick and Press for help in 2016. Their Y-chromosome analysis pointed to descendants of an 18th-century immigrant named Nicholas, and a later search of GEDmatch identified the man as Robert Ivan Nichols of Indiana. About a month later the project identified the "Buckskin Girl", found dead near Troy, Ohio, in 1981, as Marcia L. King. It was the project's first publicly announced identification, made about two weeks before the arrest of the Golden State Killer. Other identifications made while Fitzpatrick co-led the project are listed below. By the end of 2021 the project had identified 65 people.

== Notable cases ==
=== Historical identifications and memoir hoaxes ===
Fitzpatrick led a nine-year effort to identify a mummified arm and hand recovered from a glacier at the crash site of Northwest Airlines Flight 4422, which crashed in Alaska in 1948. After she traced the maternal line of a candidate victim to a living relative in Ireland, fingerprint and mitochondrial DNA comparisons identified the remains as those of Francis Joseph Van Zandt, who was born in 1911 in Bennington, Vermont. The Armed Forces DNA Identification Laboratory, for which she consulted in 2007–2008, awarded her a service medal for the work. She later described the case in Scientific American.

In 2008 Fitzpatrick was part of the team that identified the Titanic's "Unknown Child" as Sidney Leslie Goodwin, a 19-month-old English boy. The same year, with genealogist Sharon Sergeant, she uncovered baptismal and school records disproving Misha Defonseca's purported Holocaust memoir Misha: A Mémoire of the Holocaust Years; Defonseca then admitted the story was invented. Fitzpatrick and Sergeant, working with a team led by Michigan State University historian Ken Waltzer, also found problems in Herman Rosenblat's Holocaust memoir Angel at the Fence. Identifinders later examined the wartime story told in the book The Mascot.

From 2009 Fitzpatrick worked on the case of Benjaman Kyle, a man with amnesia whose identity was unknown. Her analysis of his DNA pointed to the surname Powell, and he was later identified as William Burgess Powell by genetic genealogist CeCe Moore and her volunteers. In 2016 she traced the DNA of Lori Ruff, an identity thief who had died by suicide in 2010, to a relative in the Philadelphia area, which identified Ruff as Kimberly McLean, a teenager who had run away from home about 30 years earlier.

=== Criminal cold cases ===
In 2011 Fitzpatrick began working on the 1991 murder of Sarah Yarborough in Washington state. Identifinders describes this as the first known use of direct-to-consumer DNA test data to generate leads in a cold case. Her 2011 Y-DNA lead was criticized by other genealogists at the time. The work narrowed the suspects to two brothers, and in 2019 Patrick Leon Nicholas was charged with the murder. The retired detective Jim Allen said, "Colleen Fitzpatrick solved this case, period." Nicholas was convicted in May 2023 and sentenced to nearly 46 years in prison. The case was one of six finalists for the 2020 DNA Hit of the Year awarded by Gordon Thomas Honeywell Governmental Affairs; Identifinders reports that it placed fifth.

In 2014 Fitzpatrick offered to help Phoenix police with the Phoenix canal murders of Angela Brosso in 1992 and Melanie Bernas in 1993. By comparing the killer's Y-DNA with public profiles, she found matches to the surname Miller, and police arrested Bryan Patrick Miller on January 13, 2015. Miller was convicted in 2023 and sentenced to death. ISHI News and Forensic Magazine have described the Yarborough and Phoenix cases as the first forensic genetic genealogy leads and the first homicide solved with the technique, respectively. Identifinders reports that the Phoenix case placed fifth in the 2018 DNA Hit of the Year.

In December 2022 Philadelphia police identified the "Boy in the Box", a child found murdered in 1957 and the city's oldest unsolved homicide, as Joseph Augustus Zarelli. Fitzpatrick and Identifinders carried out the genetic genealogy, using DNA from the exhumed remains.

Other cases include:

Year	Case	Outcome	Ref.
2019	1968 homicide of Gwen Miller, Rapid City, South Dakota	Rapid City police credited Fitzpatrick and Identifinders with the forensic genealogy that solved the case	
2020	1968 murder of a woman found in Huntington Beach, California, Orange County's oldest Jane Doe case	Victim identified as Anita Louise Piteau, and Johnny Chrisco (died 2015) named as the suspect; the Orange County District Attorney credited Fitzpatrick	
2020	1988 death of a newborn boy ("Baby David Paul"), Meriden, Connecticut	His mother identified after Fitzpatrick worked the case from 2012	
2020	1987 murder of Barbara Blatnik, Ohio	The Porchlight Project's first case; it paid for Fitzpatrick's research, and James Zastawnik was arrested	
2021	1972 murder of Julie Ann Hanson, Naperville, Illinois	Barry Lee Whelpley charged after Fitzpatrick linked him to crime-scene DNA; he died in jail in 2024 while awaiting trial	
2022	1992 murder of Nona Stamey Cobb, Surry County, North Carolina	Warren Luther Alexander arrested; in 2024 he was also charged with three 1977 killings in Ventura County, California	
2022	2003 killing of police officer Jeff Garner, Watauga, Texas (the "Cowboy Hat Bandit" case)	Suspect identified as Mark Alan Long, who had since died	
2023	"Sandy Point John Doe", Victoria, Australia	Identified as Christopher Luke Moore by a Victorian Institute of Forensic Medicine, Australian Federal Police, NSW Police and Othram team mentored by Fitzpatrick	
2025	Remains from the 1980s Lake–Ng killings, Wilseyville, California	Identifinders helped identify a victim as Reginald Frisby	

=== DNA Doe Project identifications ===
Identifications made by the DNA Doe Project while Fitzpatrick was co-executive director include:

Year	Case	Identified as	Ref.
2018	Joseph Newton Chandler III (died 2002, Ohio)	Robert Ivan Nichols	
2018	"Buckskin Girl" (found 1981, Ohio)	Marcia L. King	
2018	"Lyle Stevik" (died 2001)	Real name withheld	
2018	"Alfred Jake Fuller" (found dead 2014, Oakland, Maine)	Real name withheld	
2018	"Anaheim Jane Doe" (found 1987, California)	Tracey Coreen Hobson	
2019	"Belle in the Well" (found 1981, Ohio)	Louise Virginia Peterson Flesher	
2019	"Butler County Jane Doe" (found 2015, West Chester, Ohio)	Darlene Wilson Norcross	
2019	"Sheep's Flat Jane Doe" (found 1982, Nevada)	Mary Edith Silvani	
2019	"Annie Doe" (found 1971, Oregon)	Anne Marie Lehman of Aberdeen, Washington	
2019	"Mill Creek Shed Man" (found 2015, Washington)	Nathaniel Terrence "Terry" Deggs	
2020	"Corona Girl" (found 1989, Texas)	Sue Ann Huskey	
2020	"Lime Lady" (found 1980, Jones, Oklahoma)	Tamara Lee Tigard	
2020	"Peoria County John Doe" (found 2016, Illinois)	John H. Frisch Jr.	

== Somerton Man case ==
The Somerton Man was an unidentified man found dead at Somerton Beach in Adelaide, South Australia, in 1948. Fitzpatrick first heard of the case in 2013 and met University of Adelaide professor Derek Abbott, who had been investigating it, in 2014; the two worked on it together from then on. (An earlier ABC report dates their first meeting to 2012.) In 2020 she put Abbott in touch with the visual effects artist Daniel Voshart, who produced a lifelike reconstruction of the man's face.

In 2011 South Australia Police had given Abbott's team access to a plaster bust of the man, in which some of his hairs were embedded. Fitzpatrick suggested sending a hair to the forensic DNA company Astrea Forensics. A rootless hair shaft yielded about two million SNPs, which were uploaded to GEDmatch, and by February 2022 the team had enough DNA to search genealogy databases. A match to a distant cousin in Victoria led to a family tree of more than 4,000 people, which Abbott and Fitzpatrick built together. They narrowed it to Carl "Charles" Webb, a Melbourne-born electrical engineer and instrument maker with no recorded date of death, who was found through a paternal relative and confirmed through a maternal one. Fitzpatrick likened the work to solving a Sudoku puzzle.

Abbott and Fitzpatrick announced the identification on July 26, 2022. Fitzpatrick appeared in "My Name Is Charles", a November 2022 episode of the ABC program Australian Story about the case. In the article accompanying the episode, she was quoted as saying, "I am 100 per cent convinced that we have the right guy. Charles Webb is the Somerton Man."

== Professional associations ==
Fitzpatrick was an associate member of the American Academy of Forensic Sciences for ten years and was promoted to Member in 2021, at the time the only forensic genetic genealogist with that status. She has worked to have forensic genealogy recognized by the academy. Also in 2021 she was invited to join the Vidocq Society, whose core membership is limited to 82. Identifinders is a member of the Australian and New Zealand Forensic Science Society. Fitzpatrick serves on the advisory committee of the Texas Attorney General's Cold Case and Missing Persons Unit. She was a consultant to the Armed Forces DNA Identification Laboratory in 2007–2008, and was elected a Fellow of SPIE in 2007.

== Awards and honors ==
- 1972 – Alumna of the Science Talent Search
- 2007 – Second place, article category, International Society of Family History Writers and Editors, for "Genealogy Meets CSI" (Family Tree Magazine, April 2006)
- 2007 – Fellow of SPIE
- 2007 – Armed Forces DNA Identification Laboratory Service Medal, for identifying a victim of the 1948 crash of Northwest Airlines Flight 4422
- 2008 – First place, International Society of Family History Writers and Editors, for "Clues Around the House" (Ancestry Magazine, May/June 2007)
- 2010 – First place, International Society of Family History Writers and Editors, for "One Man, Two Names, Three Families" (Ancestry Magazine, July/August 2009)
- 2018 – Fifth place (as reported by Identifinders), Gordon Thomas Honeywell DNA Hit of the Year, for the Phoenix canal murders
- 2019 – Citizen of the Year, U.S. Marshals Service, Northern District of Ohio, shared with Margaret Press, for the Joseph Newton Chandler III identification
- 2020 – Top-six finalist and fifth place (as reported by Identifinders), Gordon Thomas Honeywell DNA Hit of the Year, for the Sarah Yarborough case
- 2025 – Third place (as reported by Identifinders), shared with the Philadelphia Police Department, Gordon Thomas Honeywell Cold Case Hit of the Year, for the Boy in the Box identification

== Public outreach ==
Fitzpatrick lectures and teaches widely in North America, Europe, Australia and New Zealand, and has written for genealogy magazines including Family Tree Magazine and Ancestry Magazine. Talks on her cases can be booked through a speakers bureau. Selected talks include:

- 2015 – Forensic genealogy seminar in Brisbane, co-hosted by the Queensland Family History Society and the Genealogical Society of Queensland
- 2018 – "You Will Never Look at Your Old Photos the Same Way Again", Genealogical Society of North Orange County California
- 2019 – "Forensic Genealogy and the Identification of 'The Buckskin Girl': A 37-Year-Old Cold Case", Middle Tennessee State University
- 2020 – Speaker at the 31st International Symposium on Human Identification (ISHI)
- 2023 – "How Should Forensic Genetic Genealogy Navigate the Court System?", ISHI, Colorado Convention Center, Denver
- 2023 – "Beyond the OMG Era: Forensic Genetic Genealogy 2011–2023, Expectations Versus Realities", Journal of Forensic Sciences Forensic Lab Talks, American Academy of Forensic Sciences

== Filmography ==
=== Television ===
Year	Title	Network	Role	Notes	Ref.
2009	Nationwide	RTÉ One	Herself	Segment: "From Alaska to Askeaton", on the Flight 4422 identification	
2019	Dateline NBC	NBC	Herself	Web segment: "What is forensic genealogy?", with Keith Morrison	
2019	Bloodline Detectives	Peninsula Television	Herself	Two interviews: the Jodine Serrin case, and the Sheep's Flat Jane Doe and Phoenix canal murders cases	
2022	News Breakfast	ABC	Herself	Interview on the Somerton Man identification	
2022	Australian Story	ABC	Herself	Episode: "My Name Is Charles", on the Somerton Man	
2023	Dateline NBC	NBC	Herself	Episode: "On the Hunt for The Zombie Hunter", on the Phoenix canal murders	

=== Radio and podcasts ===
Year	Title	Network	Role	Notes	Ref.
2005	Talk of the Nation	NPR	Guest	Segment: "Genealogy, Forensics and the Digital Age", with host Neal Conan and Megan Smolenyak	
2014	Afternoons	RNZ National	Guest	Segment: "Gene detective", on the Titanic "Unknown Child"	
2020	Mind Over Murder	Independent podcast	Guest	Episodes 26 and 27: "Forensic Genealogist Colleen Fitzpatrick on How DNA Solves Cases"	
2022	True Crime Conversations	Mamamia	Guest	Episode: "Solving The Somerton Man Mystery"	
2022	Mind Over Murder	Independent podcast	Guest	Episode 194: "Colleen Fitzpatrick on Solving Somerton Man Mystery (Part 2)"	

== Selected works ==
Fitzpatrick's publications span physics, optics and forensic genealogy, from 1981 to 2022.

=== Books ===
- Fitzpatrick, Colleen (2005). Forensic Genealogy. Fountain Valley, CA: Rice Book Press. ISBN 978-0-9767160-0-6.
- Fitzpatrick, Colleen; Yeiser, Andrew (2005). DNA & Genealogy. Fountain Valley, CA: Rice Book Press. ISBN 978-0-9767160-1-3.
- Fitzpatrick, Colleen (2008). The Dead Horse Investigation: Forensic Photo Analysis for Everyone. Fountain Valley, CA: Rice Book Press. ISBN 978-0-9767160-5-1.

=== Book chapters ===
- Fitzpatrick, Colleen (2006). "The Key is the Camera". In Balleza, Jeannette (ed.). The Desperate Genealogist's Idea Book: Creative Ways to Outsmart Your Elusive Ancestors. DeadFred.com. ISBN 978-1-4243-0209-3.

=== Journal and magazine articles ===
- Fitzpatrick, Colleen (2022). "John Ramsey's Request for Renewed DNA Analysis: A Comment". Forensic Genomics. 2 (2): 31–32. doi:10.1089/forensic.2022.29012.cf. ISSN 2690-8956.
- Fitzpatrick, Colleen (December 2011). "Arm in the Ice". Scientific American. Vol. 305, no. 6. pp. 90–93. doi:10.1038/scientificamerican1211-90. PMID 22214135.
- Loreille, Odile M.; Parr, Ryan L.; McGregor, Kevin A.; Fitzpatrick, Colleen M.; Lyon, Chris; Yang, Dongya Y.; Speller, Camilla F.; Grimm, Michael R.; Grimm, Michael J.; Irwin, Jodi A.; Robinson, Edward M. (2010). "Integrated DNA and Fingerprint Analyses in the Identification of 60-Year-Old Mummified Human Remains Discovered in an Alaskan Glacier". Journal of Forensic Sciences. 55 (3): 813–818. doi:10.1111/j.1556-4029.2010.01356.x. ISSN 0022-1198. PMID 20384910.

=== Conference papers and abstracts ===
- Fitzpatrick, Colleen (April 19, 2011). "Hand in the snow". Journal of Cheminformatics. 3 (Suppl 1) O1. doi:10.1186/1758-2946-3-S1-O1. ISSN 1758-2946. PMC 3083539. (abstract, 6th German Conference on Chemoinformatics, Goslar, 2010)
- Fitzpatrick, Colleen; Yeiser, Andrew; Netherwood, G. (2004). Waveguide-Based Inertial Navigation Sensor Architecture. 42nd AIAA Aerospace Sciences Meeting and Exhibit. American Institute of Aeronautics and Astronautics. doi:10.2514/6.2004-549.
- Fitzpatrick, Colleen M.; Abid, M.; Netherwood, G.; Ketsdever, Andrew D.; Haas, J. M. (2003). "Nonintrusive fiber optic diagnostic for monitoring spacecraft contamination". Optical Diagnostics for Fluids, Solids, and Combustion II. Proceedings of SPIE. Vol. 5191. p. 234. doi:10.1117/12.513430.
- Fitzpatrick, Colleen; Smart, A. E.; Abid, M. (2002). Microdiagnostics for Miniature Propulsion Systems. 40th AIAA Aerospace Sciences Meeting & Exhibit. American Institute of Aeronautics and Astronautics. doi:10.2514/6.2002-918.
- Fitzpatrick, Colleen M.; Spariosu, K. (1998). Comparison of pulsed versus cw behavior of the diffraction efficiency of bacteriorhodopsin thin films. International Conference on Optical Holography and its Applications. Proceedings of SPIE. Vol. 3486. pp. 131–143. doi:10.1117/12.323775.
- Fitzpatrick, Colleen; Vali, V.; Youmans, B. R. (1996). "Integrated optics rotation sensor (IORS) for dual use in military and commercial applications". AIP Conference Proceedings. AIP Conference Proceedings. Vol. 361. pp. 461–464. doi:10.1063/1.49848. (also Proceedings of SPIE 2566: 50–53, 1995, doi:10.1117/12.217384)
- Fitzpatrick, Colleen; Cameron, C. P.; Kitazawa, H.; Roberson, N. R.; Tilley, D. R.; Weller, H. R. (1981). Polarized proton capture to the first excited state in ^{31}P. AIP Conference Proceedings. Vol. 69. pp. 602–604. doi:10.1063/1.32604.

== Personal life ==
Fitzpatrick's partner was Andrew "Andy" Yeiser, who was born in Omaha, Nebraska. He studied physics at the Massachusetts Institute of Technology and the University of California, Berkeley, then moved early into computer engineering. He left aerospace work and a teaching post at the University of California, Los Angeles to found his own company, which he later sold, and worked for decades as an engineering consultant on United Nations assignments in countries including Turkey, Iran, Egypt, India, Nigeria, Austria, Guyana, Malaysia and Yugoslavia. He co-authored DNA & Genealogy (2005) with Fitzpatrick, and a 2004 paper for the American Institute of Aeronautics and Astronautics (AIAA) on inertial navigation sensors. He co-founded Identifinders International with her and died in 2016.

== See also ==
- Investigative genetic genealogy
- Tamam Shud case
