= Trans Doe Task Force =

American non-profit organization

- Formation: 2018
- Legal status: Nonprofit
- Headquarters: Orange, Massachusetts, U.S.
- Website: transdoetaskforce.org

The Trans Doe Task Force is an American non-profit organization focused on helping to solve cold cases relating to transgender missing persons and unidentified decedents. The organization both maintains a database of missing transgender persons and uses forensic genealogy in cases of interest. The organization is based in Orange, Massachusetts.

The Task Force has been involved in multiple high profile cold cases, including those of Pamela Walton ("Julie Doe")

The Task Force is volunteer-run, with all volunteer being either trans themselves or having transgender relatives or friends.

== History ==
The Task Force was co-founded in 2018 by Anthony Redgrave and Lee Bingham Redgrave, who were previously volunteers with the DNA Doe Project, where they were involved in identifying the murderer of Christine Jessop. The Redgraves, both trans men, were drawn to form the Task Force after the murder of their friend, activist Christa Steele-Knudslien in January 2018, and feeling that "nobody was doing anything about missing transgender cases". The first case the organization began to look into was that of Julie Doe, only identified in 2025 as Pamela Walton.

== Forensic genealogy ==
The organization's lead forensic genealogist is Anthony Redgrave, who owns Redgrave Research Forensic Services with Lee Bingham Redgrave. The organization does not deal with genetic evidence directly, instead drawing from companies such as GEDmatch.

=== Notable identifications ===
- Pillar Point Doe (identified 2019), found in San Mateo, California, 1983
- William Lewis (identified 2022), "Jasper County John Doe"
- William Dennis Mathews, of Louisville, Kentucky (identified 2024), found in Daviess County, 1990

== Databases ==
=== LAMMP ===
The organization maintains the LGBT+ Accountability for Missing and Murdered Persons (LAMMP) database, which tracks missing people and unidentified bodies known or thought to be transgender or non-binary. They have noted the importance of this project in regards to federal databases, some of which have obscured information related to transgender missing persons cases. The database is "accessible only by request from law enforcement agencies and investigators".

By 2021, the organization was tracking 173 "unresolved cases". In 2024, the organization added "209 unidentified dead and 1,021 missing persons cases" to the database, which included people from more than 30 countries.

Some members of the task force look into missing persons and unidentified body databases from both within and outside the country, looking for additional cases to add to the database. Volunteers look into unidentified body reports for details such as gender-nonconforming appearances or signs of HRT treatment. By late 2019, this numbered about 20 volunteers.

=== #IFIGOMISSING ===
The organization also maintains a self-submit database called "#IfIGoMissing". This database aims to collect the personal information of at-risk transgender persons, allowing for the distribution of accurate information to law enforcement and news media if a person does go missing. Because much of the information in the database belongs to minors, it is not accessible to the public.

== Partnerships ==
The Trans Doe Task Force has offered to partner with Massachusetts state agencies to work on missing persons cases, but state agencies have not reciprocated. The Task Force leadership has suggested this is due to the organization's small size compared to other similar organizations. The organization has worked with some groups outside the state, including a medical examiner team in Harris County, Texas and the Forensic Anthropology Lab at Michigan State University.

The organization maintains a partnership with the DNA Doe Project, and has both worked closely with and referred cases of interest to the group.
