= Jane Doe 1980 =

Jane Doe 1980 may refer to the following unidentified people:

- Kern County Jane Doe, found on July 15, 1980, in Delano, Kern County, California.
- Ventura County Jane Doe, found on July 18, 1980, in Westlake, California.
- "Eklutna Annie," found on July 21, 1980, in Eklutna, Anchorage, Alaska.
- Arroyo Grande Jane Doe, found on October 5, 1980, in Henderson, Clark County, Nevada.
- Walker County Jane Doe, found on November 1, 1980, in Huntsville, Walker County, Texas.

== Identified ==
- Sandra Morden, found February 1, 1980 near Amboy, Washington and identified in 2019.
- Donna Brazzell, found November 5, 1980 in Rapides Parish, Louisiana and identified in 2019.
- Tamara Tigard, AKA "Lime Lady", found April 18, 1980 near Jones, Oklahoma County, Oklahoma and identified in 2020.
