= Bryan Patrick Miller =

American convicted murderer (born 1972)

- Born: 1972 (age 53–54); United States
- Other names: The Zombie Hunter, The Canal Killer
- Convictions: First-degree murder (2 counts); Attempted sexual assault (2 counts); Kidnapping (2 counts)
- Penalty: Death

Details
- Victims: 2–3+
- Span of crimes: 1992–1993
- Country: United States
- State: Arizona
- Date apprehended: January 2015

Bryan Patrick Miller (born 1972), known as The Zombie Hunter or The Canal Killer, is an American man convicted of murdering two women along canals in Phoenix, Arizona, during the early 1990s. He evaded justice for more than 20 years until his arrest in 2015, when DNA evidence and forensic genealogy linked him to the cold cases. In 2023, he was found guilty on multiple charges and sentenced to death.

This was the first cold case solved through the use of investigative genetic genealogy.

== Early life ==
Miller was raised in Phoenix, Arizona. His childhood was reportedly abusive, particularly because of his mother, Ellen, who worked as a detention officer. In 1989, at age 16, Miller stabbed a woman at the Paradise Valley Mall and was placed in juvenile detention. In 2002, he was arrested again in Washington for stabbing another woman, a crime he claimed was committed in self-defense. He was married in the late 1990s and had a daughter in 2000, divorcing in 2006.

== "Zombie Hunter" persona ==
Miller became a well-known figure in local cosplay and sci-fi communities under the persona of "The Zombie Hunter." He attended conventions and public events in a modified police car decorated with fake blood and steampunk gear. He later said this identity helped him feel "less invisible to the world."

== Canal murders ==
=== Victims ===
- Angela Brosso, 22 – Murdered on November 8, 1992. Her body was found decapitated and mutilated near the Arizona Canal in Phoenix. Her head was discovered 11 days later.
- Melanie Bernas, 17 – Killed in September 1993 and found in the same area. Her body bore stab wounds and ritualistic markings.

Both women had been sexually assaulted. DNA collected from the crime scenes was eventually matched to Miller.

== Arrest and trial ==
In 2014, Colleen M. Fitzpatrick helped police narrow down the list of suspects to five men with the surname Miller. In January 2015, police covertly collected a DNA sample from Bryan Miller at a Chili's restaurant, which matched evidence from both murders. He was arrested and charged with two counts of first-degree murder, kidnapping, and sexual assault. Miller had been a suspect at the time of the murders, but not charged for lack of evidence. Fitzpatrick believes this was the first cold case solved by genetic genealogy.

Miller pleaded not guilty by reason of insanity, claiming he suffered from dissociative disorders stemming from childhood trauma. In January 2022, he was found competent to stand trial. He waived his right to a jury trial, and in April 2023, he was found guilty by Superior Court Judge Suzanne Cohen.

== Sentencing ==
On June 7, 2023, Miller was sentenced to death for both murders, along with additional prison terms for related charges. He is currently on death row at the Rincon Unit of the Arizona State Prison Complex – Tucson. His sentence triggers an automatic appeal.

Miller gave interviews after sentencing in which he maintained he did not commit the murders and disagreed with defense experts who testified dissociative amnesia means he could not remember anything about the murders.

== Other suspected crimes ==
Miller is suspected in the 1992 disappearance of 13-year-old Brandy Myers. He allegedly confessed to his ex-wife about abducting and dismembering a young girl matching Myers' description, though he has not been formally charged. Phoenix Police recommended murder charges against Miller for the death of Myers, but the county attorney's office under Bill Montgomery declined to prosecute.

He is also believed to have been involved in other stabbings and attacks dating back to his adolescence.

== Media ==
The case was featured in a 2023 episode of 48 Hours titled "Unmasking the Zombie Hunter". The Dateline episode, "On the Hunt for The Zombie Hunter" also covers the case. It has also been covered in the True Crime Arizona Podcast: The Zombie Hunter by KTVK.

In October 2025, Detective Troy Hillman, the lead cold case detective, published a book regarding the investigation.

== See also ==
- Capital punishment in Arizona
- List of death row inmates in the United States § Arizona
- List of serial killers in the United States
