= GEDmatch =

Genetic genealogy website

- Available in: English
- Owner: Verogen Inc
- Founders: Curtis Rogers and John Olson
- Parent: Qiagen
- Website: gedmatch.com
- Registration: Required
- Users: 1.45 million DNA profiles (in Fall 2020)

GEDmatch is a public website and online service with DNA and genealogy tools for comparing autosomal DNA in personal family research and for law enforcement in forensic investigative research. Users upload their DNA data files from various genealogy testing companies, and the data is used for DNA comparison of other users and by law enforcement, putting GEDmatch in focus of news media and regulatory bodies for their failure to protect user data privacy and allowing law enforcement to compare DNA without user consent. Originally founded by two amateur genealogists, GEDmatch was acquired in 2020 by Qiagen and is now operated by their company Verogen Inc, a forensic testing company specialized in law enforcement forensic investigative DNA research within the same corporate group.

GEDmatch gained significant media coverage on multiple occasions, notably in April 2018 when it was used by law enforcement to identify a suspect in the Golden State Killer case in California. This case led other law enforcement agencies to start using GEDmatch for DNA comparison of suspect DNA in their investigations of violent crimes, making it "the de facto DNA and genealogy database for all of law enforcement", according to The Atlantic's Sarah Zhang. When GEDmatch caught the attention of regulators it was discovered that law enforcement had, with the help of insiders at GEDmatch, been allowed to run DNA comparison analysis on all users regardless of whether the users had chosen to "opt-out" from such comparisons.

== History ==
GEDmatch was founded in 2010 by Curtis Rogers, a retired businessman, and John Olson, a transportation engineer, in Lake Worth, Florida, with its main purpose being to help "amateur and professional researchers and genealogists", including adoptees searching for birth parents.

Users can upload their autosomal DNA test data from commercial DNA companies to identify potential relatives who had also uploaded their DNA data. Names of participants may be hidden by the use of aliases, but each account must have an email address attached to it. Users may share the ancestry of each DNA participant by uploading a GEDCOM file containing that person's ancestry, or by linking to the assigned DNA kit number from that person's profile at WikiTree, a free, shared global family tree. Tools available on the GEDmatch site include the ability to sort results by the closest matches to a user's autosomal DNA, determining whether one's matches also match to each other, using a genetic-distance calculator, estimating the number of generations to the most recent common ancestor, determining whether one's parents are related, and using various ethnicity calculators. These tools are not supposed to disclose raw genetic data to other users though it has happened on multiple occasions (see below).

Tier 1 premium membership includes triangulation, matching segment search and a custom comparison system. By May 2018, the GEDmatch database had 929,000 genetic profiles, with 7,300 users who paid $10 a month for Tier 1 premium membership, which was used to pay for the $200,000/year server costs. In 2018, the website was still being run by Rogers and Olsen with five volunteers; it had no full-time staff. Rogers said in 2018 that the site had already helped 10,000 adoptees find their biological parents.

As of December 9, 2019, GEDmatch was acquired by Verogen, Inc., a sequencing company solely dedicated to forensic science. For the 1.2 million DNA profiles, a new version of the existing site will focus on solving crimes. How much GEDmatch continues to serve genetic genealogical research has been heavily discussed since then. BuzzFeed News reported that Verogen hopes to monetize the site by charging for access to the database and tools for DNA analysis. Founder Curtis Rogers, in a website statement, announced that "basic tools will remain free", he will remain involved in all aspects of the business, and Verogen will commit to the vision of a consumer genealogy site and take care of infrastructure and security/privacy. At the same time, Rogers claimed that "genealogy has made our communities safer by putting violent criminals behind bars". As of September 2020, there were about 1.45 million users on the site, and by October, the site had led to an estimated 150 arrests in cold cases.

== Data privacy at GEDmatch ==
User data privacy and confidentiality of user data especially within genealogic testing continue to be a topic of discussion. Handling of user data at GEDmatch has come into question and lead to attention from regulatory authorities. Despite implementing user opt-out policies regarding law enforcement access, GEDmatch has experienced security incidents. For example, the July 2020 incident, which lasted roughly 3 hours, involved a security breach that temporarily reset user permission settings, making profiles that had opted out for law enforcement matching visible to others.

=== Data privacy policy changes ===
As of May 2025, the terms of service (dated 22 November 2024) that apply between users and Verogen Inc operating GEDmatch, state that uploaded DNA data "remains the property of the person who uploaded it" and the user has to select privacy level for each DNA file uploaded; Private (no comparison to other people), Opt-In (allow comparison to all in the database, including those submitted by law enforcement), Opt-Out (allow comparison to other users but not to law enforcement) or Personal Research (compare to other users, but don't show your profile on reports for your matches).

Prior policies of GEDmatch include the privacy statement as of April 2018 (under their previous owner) which stated that GEDmatch will "provide DNA and genealogy tools for comparison and research purposes" and that it "by its very nature, requires the sharing of information. Because of that, users participating in this site should expect that their information will be shared with other users". Showing that DNA data sharing and comparing with other users has been clearly stated by GEDmatch.

In May 2019, GEDmatch began requiring people who had uploaded their DNA to its site to make a selection in their privacy settings, either opt-out or the opposite, opt-in, in order to allow law-enforcement agencies to access their DNA profile and user information for their DNA comparison in forensic investigations. This change in privacy policy was expected to limit law enforcement agencies' abilities to identify suspects using genetic genealogy. By May 2020, about 260,000 GEDmatch users had opted in.

Under the updated policy, investigators could not quietly upload a fake profile to a genealogy website, as some had done in hopes of finding a suspect's distant relatives, without first identifying themselves. The site itself must have informed its users that law-enforcement agencies may search their data. The policy also barred federal investigators from using a suspect's DNA profile to look for genes related to disease risks or psychological traits. Another provision attempted to limit situations in which federal investigators secretly take a DNA sample from a suspect's relative—from a discarded cup or tissue, for example—to help home in on a suspect. The policy said that the person must give their informed consent unless federal investigators have obtained a search warrant. These guidelines applied to federal investigators and federally funded investigations but did not apply to state or local law-enforcement agencies – the vast majority of investigations.

=== Data privacy breaches ===
GEDmatch has failed to maintain user data security and confidentiality with incidents leading to attention from regulatory authorities, despite user privacy settings and policies implemented by GEDmatch (requiring users to opt-in). Access for law enforcement to the user data was given without informed consent; negative user reactions led to the implementation of an opt-in system for law-enforcement matching. For new uploads, "opt in" is the default selection actively recommended for users, shedding doubt on whether this could be truly "opt-in", which requires action in order to signal one's interest in what is being offered or proposed. Moreover, what is being opted into is not explicitly stated.

In November 2023, GEDmatch put out a press release in response to their failure to maintain data privacy, and breach by GEDmatch of the terms of service. Forensic genealogy practitioners of GEDmatch had circumvented GEDmatch user privacy settings (see below) and had allowed law enforcement to conduct DNA comparison in violation with user settings. This had enabled law enforcement to access DNA profiles of users on GEDmatch who had not opted in to such law enforcement investigative comparisons. In addition, these practitioners had asked law enforcement to keep this misuse secret, had trained others how to use it, and even doctored reports to prevent the misuse from becoming known. Through this misuse, information about user's genetic relationships (which were not supposed to be available for law-enforcement investigations) were made available for comparison, despite the user having denied such use.

In November 2019, a Florida judge approved a police request for a warrant to search the database of GEDmatch. The warrant was served by law enforcement in Florida, who demanded access to all user DNA profiles, including those of the vast majority of users who had not opted in to allow law-enforcement access (at that time, approximately 185,000 of 1.3 million users had opted in). GEDmatch complied with this warrant.

In September 2019, the U.S Department of Justice released interim guidelines governing when federal investigators or federally funded investigations could use genetic genealogy to track down suspects in serious crimes. This first-ever policy covering how these databases should be used in law-enforcement attempts to balance public safety and privacy concerns. The policy said that "forensic genetic genealogy" should generally be used only for violent crimes such as murder and rape, as well as to identify human remains. (The policy permitted broader use if the ancestry database's policy allowed such searches.) Investigators should first exhaust traditional crime-solving methods, including searching their own criminal DNA databases.

== Usage by law enforcement ==
In December 2018, police forces in the United States said that, with the help of GEDmatch and genetic genealogy, they had been able to find suspects in a total of 28 cold cases of murder and rape that year. Also in December 2018, Family Tree DNA allowed law enforcement agencies, including the FBI, to upload DNA profiles from crime scenes to help solve cold crimes. As of that time, GEDmatch was not the only site that could be used by law enforcement officials to solve crimes using genetic genealogy.

White people are overrepresented on GEDmatch and are believed to be underrepresented in CODIS, the FBI's collection of DNA samples pulled from crime scenes, arrestees, and criminal suspects. Thus, GEDmatch may be especially effective in facilitating the arrests of white suspects who might otherwise have eluded law enforcement. On May 18, 2019, GEDmatch revised its privacy statement to users regarding the collection and use of genetic information, including the circumstances in which it may cooperate with law-enforcement use of its database. As of September 2020, GEDmatch has been credited for helping facilitate nearly 120 cold-case arrests and for helping in 11 "Jane and John Doe" identifications across the United States.

=== General cases solved or suspects identified using GEDmatch ===
- California law enforcement investigating the Golden State Killer case uploaded the DNA profile of the suspected serial rapist/killer from an intact rape kit in Ventura County to GEDmatch. It identified 10 to 20 distant relatives of the Golden State Killer, and a team of five investigators working with genealogist Barbara Rae-Venter used those results to construct a large family tree, which led them to identify former police officer Joseph James DeAngelo as a suspect. Investigators acquired samples of his DNA from items he discarded outside his home, one of which definitively matched that of the killer. The process took about four months, from the time the first matches appeared on GEDmatch to the time when DeAngelo was arrested in April 2018.
- In September 2018, Roy Charles Waller was arrested as a suspect in a series of more than ten rapes between 1991 and 2006 in Northern California (the "Norcal Rapist"), after DNA evidence from crime scenes were matched on GEDmatch to a relative. Police then constructed a family tree and, using the known characteristics of the rapist, narrowed the suspects down to Waller. It took little more than a week to identify and arrest the suspect. He was charged with 40 counts of rape.
- In May 2019, a grand jury in Orange County, North Carolina, indicted John Russell Whitt on first-degree murder charges related to the death of his son, Robert "Bobby" Adam Whitt. Bobby Whitt's skeleton was discovered under a billboard on Interstate 85-40 in September 1998; an autopsy showed that he had died by strangulation. Although the case remained open, and hundreds of investigators worked on it over the years – including forensic artist Frank Bender – the remains were unidentified until Barbara Rae-Venter analyzed a DNA sample that suggested the boy had one white parent and one Asian parent. Using online genealogical services, she located a cousin in Hawaiʻi, who was able to provide the boy's name. The family had not reported him missing because they believed his mother, Myoung Hwa Cho, had taken him back to South Korea, where she was from. Further investigation revealed that Cho's body had been located in Spartanburg County, South Carolina, on May 13, 1998. She had been suffocated and had ligature marks around her wrists. John Whitt has confessed to both murders; he is currently serving a federal prison sentence at the Ashland FCI for armed robbery and will not be eligible for release on that charge until 2037.
- In 2020, in Toronto, Canada, police used GEDmatch to identify the murderer of Christine Jessop.

=== Parabon Nanolabs ===
In cooperation with American law enforcement organizations, Parabon NanoLabs started uploading DNA evidence from crime scenes to GEDmatch in an attempt to identify perpetrators. In November 2018, Parabon was reported to be working on 200 such cases. In May 2019, they said they were solving cold cases at the rate of about one per week.

=== DNA Doe Project ===
Two genealogical researchers, Dr. Colleen M. Fitzpatrick and Margaret Press, started the DNA Doe Project in 2017 to identify unknown bodies using GEDmatch. They use volunteers to construct the sometimes very large family trees resulting from genetic data, in order to identify missing persons. Their successes include the following:

- Identification of the "Buckskin girl", a young woman found murdered beside a road in Miami County, Ohio, in 1981, as Marcia King. She was identified by autosomal DNA through GEDmatch and genetic genealogy in March 2018.
- They also investigated a man called Joseph Newton Chandler III, found to have stolen the identity of an eight-year-old in 1978 and committed suicide in 2002 in Eastlake, Ohio, obtained a sample of his DNA and uploaded it to GEDmatch. By the genetic results, researchers identified him as Robert Ivan Nichols. This finding was revealed in late June 2018.
- They helped identify "Sheep Flats Jane Doe", a homicide victim from July 1982, who was identified as 33-year-old Mary Silvani in the summer of 2018. She had been raped and murdered near Lake Tahoe, Nevada. Washoe County Sheriff's Office withheld her name until May 2019, when they had also confirmed the identity of her killer, James Richard Curry. He had died in jail in January 1983, after confessing to two other murders and being arrested in a third. He was also identified through genetic genealogy, with the aid of the DNA Doe Project and GEDmatch.
- In December 2018, they identified a man using the alias "Alfred Jake Fuller" when he was found dead in 2014 in a Kennebec County, Maine, hotel apartment. He had died of natural causes.
- In December 2018, they identified "Anaheim Jane Doe", who had been found murdered in 1987 in Anaheim, Orange County, California. The police announced the victim's identify as 20-year-old Tracey Coreen Hobson.
- In January 2019, they identified "Lavender Doe", a young woman whose burned body had been found near a road in Gregg County, Texas, in 2006. East Texas officials announced that she was 21-year-old Dana Lynn Dodd. Joseph Burnette had confessed to her murder in 2018 but had not known her identity.
- In February 2019, a man called "Rock County John Doe" was identified using GEDmatch. His body had been found in 1995 (it was estimated he had died in 1994) in Rock County, near Clinton, Wisconsin. The police medical examiner concluded that he had died from hypothermia.
- In March 2019, the DNA Doe Project identified "Butler County Jane Doe" as 61-year-old Darlene Wilson Norcross. Norcross' body had been found in a wooded area near West Chester, Ohio, on March 7, 2015. She had never been reported as missing, and the police were unable to determine her cause of death.
- In March 2019, the project identified "Annie Doe" as 16-year-old Annie Marie Lehman who was found on August 19, 1971, in Cave Junction, Oregon, near the border with California. Some debris was noted to partially conceal the remains. The project was through collaboration with NCMEC and NamUs.
- In June 2019, "Vicky" Doe (one of serial killer Shawn Grate's first victims), murdered between 2002 and 2006 was identified as 23-year-old Dana Nicole Lowrey.
- In July 2019, "Belle in the Well", the remains of a woman found strangled in a well in Chesapeake, Ohio, in 1981, was identified as Louise Virginia Peterson Flesher. Flesher was about 65 years old at the time of her murder and was born in West Virginia.

=== Florida Department of Law Enforcement's Genetic Genealogy Program ===
In 2018, the Florida Department of Law Enforcement set up a Genetic Genealogy Program to use GEDmatch to solve cold cases. They reported in 2019 that they had solved four cases. By the end of 2020, the program had led to 10 arrests/identifications and closed several more cases.

== Law enforcement DNA comparison ==
After the arrest of the suspect in the Golden State Killer Case, co-founder Curtis Rogers said he spent weeks trying to figure out the ethics of the situation and legal options to pursue. He concluded that they did not have the resources to require police to obtain court orders to use the website. Rogers said: "It has always been GEDmatch's policy to inform users that the database could be used for other uses, as set forth in the Site Policy", and that "While the database was created for genealogical research, it is important that GEDmatch participants understand the possible uses of their DNA, including identification of relatives that have committed crimes or were victims of crimes." In late May 2018, GEDmatch updated its policy to say law enforcement could use the database to identify perpetrators of a "violent crime", meaning "homicide or sexual assault", or to identify the remains of a deceased individual. The number of people uploading their DNA increased from 1,500 per day to 5,000 per day after the DeAngelo case went public. By November 2018, there were 1.2 million GEDmatch website users.

In May 2019, GEDmatch was used to help with the arrest of a teenager who was charged with violent assault. This was the first and so far the last time GEDmatch had been used by Law Enforcement (and Parabon) for a case that did not involve homicide, rape, or kidnapping.

Civil libertarians have said the use of websites such as GEDmatch by law enforcement raises legal and privacy concerns. Professor Rori Rohlfs at San Francisco State University noted that, whereas California police had to get a judge's permission to search the CODIS police criminal database for a murder suspect's brother, they had no limitations when uploading a murder suspect's autosomal DNA to GEDmatch to identify relatives. In 2019, Charles E. Sydnor III, a Maryland delegate, sought a bill to prohibit law enforcement from using DNA databases for crime solving, but the bill was not passed. A state representative in Utah introduced a similar bill that would ban genetic genealogy searches by police.

== See also ==
- Combined DNA Index System
- Family Tree DNA
- GEDCOM
- Investigative genetic genealogy
