= Margaret Press =

American novelist

Margaret Press (born 31 March 1947) is a forensic genealogist and an author of both true crime and mystery novels. She is also known for co-founding the DNA Doe Project with Colleen M. Fitzpatrick.

== Early life and education ==
Raised in Pasadena, California, Press earned a bachelor's degree in linguistics from the University of California at Berkeley in 1968, and a Ph.D. in linguistics from the University of California at Los Angeles in 1974., with thesis work based on extensive field work in Chemehuevi, a nearly extinct Uto-Aztecan language.

== Career ==
After graduate school, Press worked as a speech and language specialist at a Boston-area school for multi-handicapped children. Later, she was a software engineer in financial services and also an author of mystery novels and true crime nonfiction.

Press became interested in forensic DNA genealogy analysis after relocating from Salem, Massachusetts, to Sebastopol, California, to live near family. She had begun working in genetic genealogy in 2007, helping friends and acquaintances find relatives, as well as helping adoptees find their biological parents. Inspired by Sue Grafton's novel "Q" Is for Quarry, about Lompoc Jane Doe, Press became interested in using genetic genealogy to also identify unidentified homicide victims.

This interest soon led to her co-founding, with Colleen M. Fitzpatrick, the DNA Doe Project, incorporated as a 501(c)3 non-profit corporation in 2017, of which she remains a board member.

== Published works ==
- Press, Margaret L. Elegy for a Thief: A Detective Sergeant Gabriel Dunn Mystery. New York: Carroll & Graf, 1993. Print. ISBN 0-88184-949-9
- Press, Margaret L. Requiem for a Postman. New York: Carroll & Graf Publishers, 1992. ISBN 0-88184-750-X
- Press, Margaret L, and Joan N. Pinkham. Counterpoint: A Murder in Massachusetts Bay. Omaha, Neb: Addicus Books, 1996. ISBN 1-886039-24-0
- Press, Margaret L and Joan N. Pinkham. A Scream on the Water: A True Story of Murder in Salem. New York, NY: St. Martin's Paperbacks, 1997. ISBN 0-312-96299-1
