= Wilson Chouest =

American criminal (born 1951)

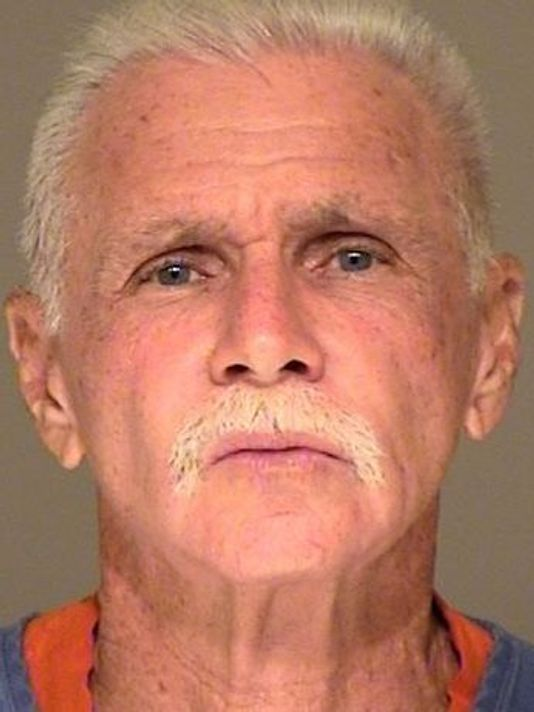
- Mug shot of Chouest
- Born: Wilson Claude Chouest Jr. December 2, 1951 (age 74); New Orleans, Louisiana, U.S.
- Status: Incarcerated
- Criminal charges: Rape, kidnapping, robbery and first degree murder
- Penalty: 2 life sentences plus 4 years
- Capture status: Captured
- Time at large: 1977–1980

Details
- Victims: 2 murders (Note: Chouest was convicted of the murders of the then-unidentified Shirley Ann Soosay and Maricela Rocha Parga but not that of Rocha Parga’s unborn son. Counting the unborn son, his victim count is 3.), 2 rapes, 1 attempted rape
- Locations: Los Angeles, Tulare, Kern and Ventura counties, California
- Weapon: Knife
- Date apprehended: 1980; 2015

Wilson Claude Chouest Jr. (/ʃuːɛst/) (born December 2, 1951) is an American murderer known for killing Shirley Soosay and Maricela Rocha Parga. Both murders occurred in the state of California in July 1980. Prior to the murders, Chouest had a history of violence toward women, including abduction, robbery, and rape; these prior crimes occurred between 1977 and 1980. Chouest, who is currently serving a life sentence, was charged with three counts of murder, including that of Rocha Parga's unborn son. He was identified as a suspect in the case in 2012, after his DNA was matched to fingernail scrapings collected from both victims.

Chouest committed crimes in Tulare, Los Angeles, Ventura, and Kern counties. He is currently serving life in prison for his murders committed in the latter two areas. On May 31, 2018, a jury found Chouest guilty of the murders of two women, but did not convict on behalf of one Ventura County victim's unborn son.

== Victims ==
Chouest's victims were found in neighboring counties in California: Kern and Ventura, in July 1980. One month before the murders, he had been released from prison after serving a kidnapping and robbery sentence for a 1978 conviction. The identities of both victims were originally unknown, despite DNA and dental records, though they were described as well-groomed and had no known arrests in the state. Chouest refused to give any information about either murder. On April 23, 2021, the Kern County Jane Doe was identified as Shirley Ann Soosay. On February 23, 2026, the Ventura County Jane Doe was identified as Maricela Rocha Parga.

After one of the murders, Chouest allegedly told Patrick Scott Bell, the son of a pen pal he had communicated with while previously incarcerated named Carolyn Bell, about having killed a woman. Patrick and his brothers then assisted Chouest with cleaning the vehicle that he had used. When confronted by their mother, one of the brothers "reacted strongly" and claimed Chouest had struck and killed a deer. Carolyn did not inform the police about this incident until her questioning in 2013.

=== Shirley Ann Soosay ===
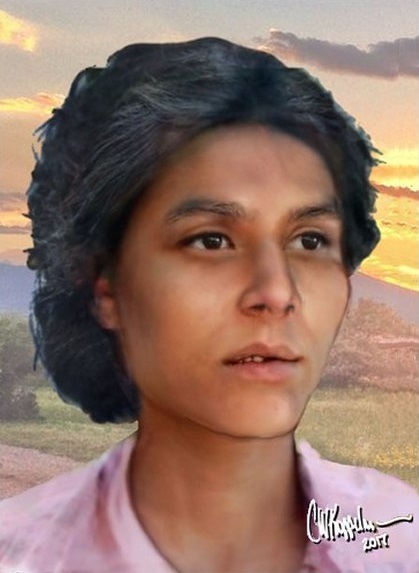
Reconstruction of Soosay by Carl Koppelman

The body of a White, Native American, or Hispanic woman was located on July 15, 1980, in Delano, Kern County, in an almond orchard. Tire tracks were observed at the scene. The victim had been murdered approximately one day prior; she was stabbed 29 times and was then transported to the location where she was later found. The woman was possibly picked up from a now-closed bar known as Ruby's that was located in Lemoore. Chouest's DNA was recovered from the woman's fingernails and clothing, and he was also linked to the victim via a bottle of Michelob beer found near her body.

The victim had two unique tattoos: a heart containing the words "I Love You," "Shirley" and "Seattle," and another that read "Mother" and "I Love You." She also had scars on her abdomen and buttock. She had worn a leg prosthesis, believed to have been the result of an injury that had occurred on her upper leg. All of her upper teeth were missing. She was intoxicated at the time of her murder, as her blood alcohol was .3 %

The words on the tattoos suggested where the victim may have once resided, as well as the name of someone to whom she may have been close. The tattoos may have also linked her to a woman named Rebecca Ochoa or Becky who had been employed at a nearby apple orchard. This woman was known to have been in the area for several weeks before the body of the victim was recovered. The victim was believed to have been twenty five to thirty five years old and at an estimated height and weight of five feet four inches and 115 pounds. It is also believed that she had given birth at least once. She wore a pink top, jeans, white shoes, and blue socks.

In 2018, the DNA Doe Project took on her case. In 2020, Violet Soosay, a niece of the decedent, came across a Facebook post made by the DDP which explained the difficulty their volunteers were having in tracing an Indigenous decedent's lineage, due to a lack of ethnic data in DNA databases. Violet Soosay sent samples of her own DNA in for comparison. With the help of those samples, the victim was identified as Shirley Ann Soosay of the Samson Cree Nation in Alberta, Canada in April 2021. Soosay is believed to be one of the first Indigenous unidentified decedents identified through forensic genealogy.

Shirley Soosay had fallen out of contact with her family in 1979. During her life, Soosay had been known for her love of traveling and, shortly before her disappearance, had talked of visiting a friend in Seattle. Following her identification, Soosay's remains were returned to her family in Alberta.

=== Maricela Rocha Parga ===
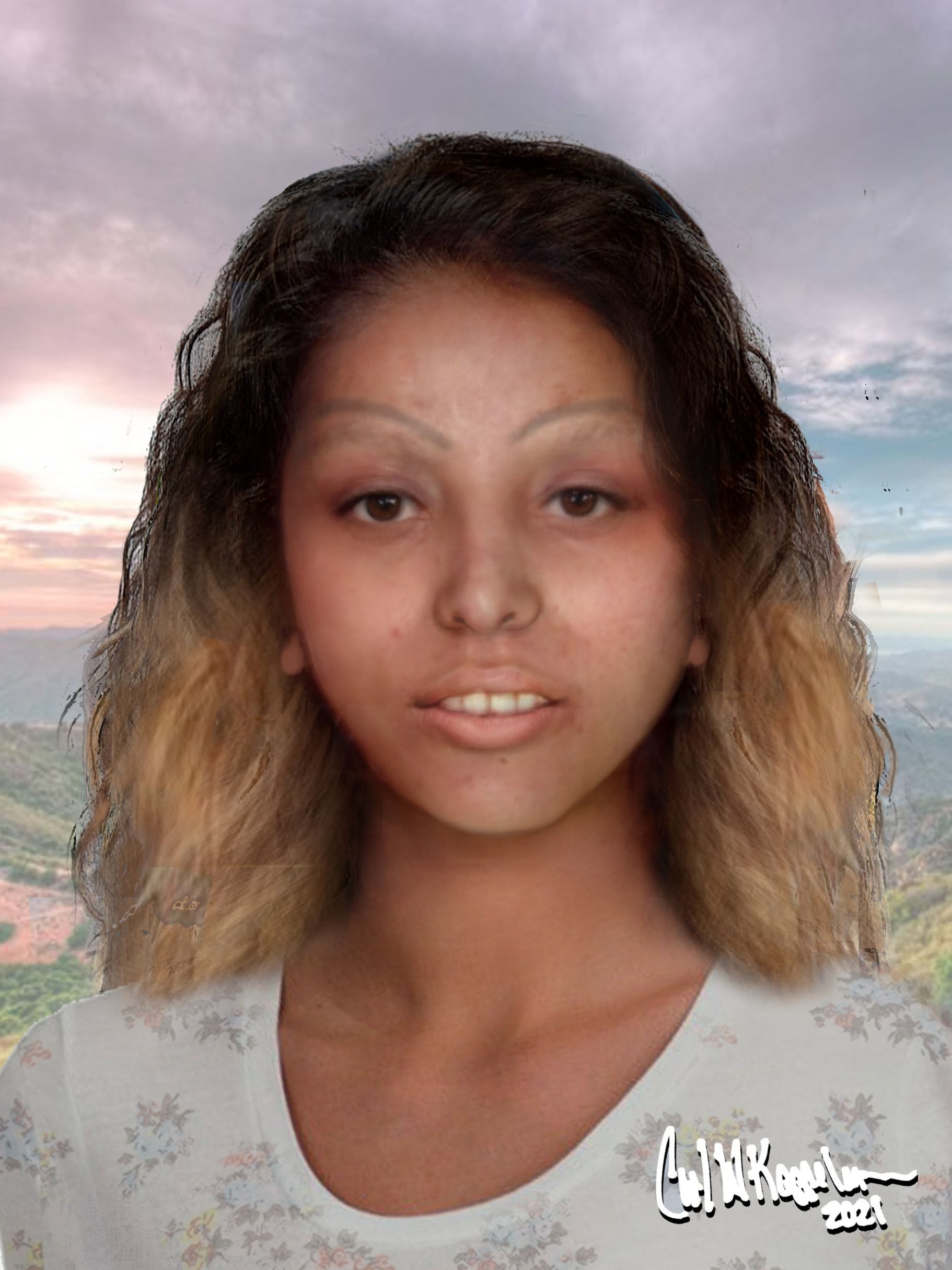
Reconstruction of Rocha Parga by Carl Koppelman

The body of a female aged fifteen to thirty was discovered lying in a high school parking lot on July 18, 1980, in Westlake, Ventura County, California. The victim had died within twelve hours of her discovery and was likely murdered at a different location. She had been dragged to where she was found, leaving a trail of blood. After the suspect was identified in the case, it was released that the woman may have possibly been kidnapped in one of the four California counties—Tulare, Kern, Ventura, and Los Angeles—Chouest frequented at the time.

She was estimated to be between five feet one and five feet three inches tall at a weight of 110 to 115 pounds. She was five months pregnant with a boy. The woman was stabbed 16 times and strangled to death after she was raped. She had brown eyes, black hair with bleached ends, and penciled eyebrows; the hairs had been shaved. The victim also had pierced ears and had a large amount of dental maintenance. DNA testing indicated the victim was primarily Native American with some Hispanic, Caucasian, Sub Saharan and Asian ancestry.

The victim had several scars and birthmarks: a pair of scars from vaccinations were present on her left arm and a scar on the left knee. She was clothed in a white shirt, underwear, a black bra, and red pants.

The victim's unborn son appeared to have been well-nourished and "adequate" prenatal care had taken place. She had given birth at least once before and had an episiotomy scar. Paternal DNA from her son did not match any known offenders in the CODIS database. The DNA match to Chouest was made in 2012. In 2018, the DNA Doe Project took on the task of identifying her at the request of law enforcement. The organization identified a third cousin of the victim through a genealogy website. In 2020, a new reconstruction was released by the NCMEC.

In November 2021, the unborn son's father was located. He was unable to provide any new information on her identity.

On February 23, 2026, she was publicly identified as 22-year-old Maricela Rocha Parga. Maricela was born in Monterrey, Mexico. She immigrated to America along with the rest of her family. Her siblings later described Maricela as independent, loving and caring. She worked during the day as a waitress and attended nursing school at night. Maricela had a two-year-old daughter at the time of her disappearance. Her family had been searching for her ever since she had gone missing.

=== Rape victims ===
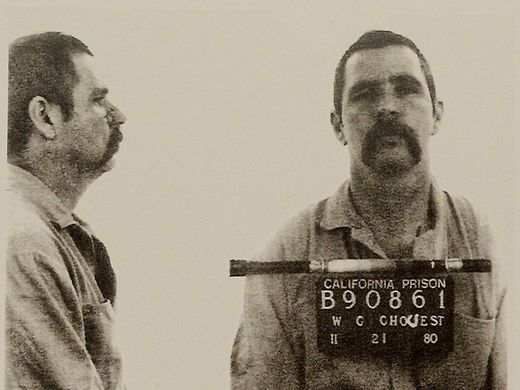
Mugshot of Chouest after his 1980 arrest in Tulare County.

Chouest attacked a woman in Los Angeles in 1977 and he committed two additional rapes in August and September 1980.

The 1977 attack occurred on October 12 when he offered his victim a ride to Topanga Canyon. He had removed the handles on the inside of the passenger area, in preparation for her attempt to escape. Once she was inside, he exposed himself and propositioned her for sex, threatening her with a knife. The woman offered her compliance and Chouest disposed of the weapon. She was later bound and driven to a hillside, where he raped her. She was then strangled and kicked until she lost consciousness, yet she survived. Before he left the scene, he had stolen some of her clothing and her purse. He was later convicted of robbery and kidnapping; the rape charge was dropped due to a plea agreement.

The attack in August 1980 was less successful. Chouest, wielding a knife, approached a woman in Visalia, California, who was leaving the College of the Sequoias, yet she refused to cooperate, declining to enter his vehicle. The woman gave her attacker her wallet and escaped once he became aware of two bystanders nearby. Her wallet contained her personal and contact information, and she received a telephone call regarding her money the next day from a man believed to be Chouest.

By September, he abducted a third woman at the same college campus with a knife. He succeeded with taking her into his vehicle, where he robbed and bound her. Driving to a cornfield, he raped her. After the woman brought up her husband, Chouest drove her back to where he kidnapped her and apologized.

Chouest was convicted of these rapes and was serving a life sentence at the time he was linked to his unidentified victims.

== Trial ==
Following his arrest in 2015, Chouest was tried in May 2018. Three of Chouest's surviving victims testified about the attacks that they experienced. Carolyn and Patrick Bell also testified. Chouest's attorney, public defender Andre Nintcheff, argued that his client's DNA did not prove he was at the crime scene and also stated that the victims consented to sexual activity.

The jury returned with guilty verdicts for the adult victims. They were unable to convict him of the murder of the fetus, as prosecutors referenced laws in place at the time of the killings, despite those laws being changed in 1994. The death penalty would not be pursued due to the age and lack of witnesses testifying on his behalf. He was given the highest eligible sentence; two life terms with no parole with four additional years. Chouest is currently incarcerated in the California Substance Abuse Treatment Facility and State Prison, Corcoran.

== Media ==
In May 2022, the murders of Shirley Soosay and Ventura County Jane Doe were featured on a Cold Case Files episode. The Hulu original docuseries Web of Death profiled the case in January 2023.
