= Murder of Pamela Walton =

Previously unidentified homicide victim

Pamela Leigh Walton
- High school yearbook photograph of Walton prior to undergoing gender transition
- Disappeared: After July 6, 1988; Lexington, Kentucky, U.S.
- Status: Identified on March 10, 2025
- Died: c. July–September 1988 (aged 25)
- Cause of death: Suspected homicide by undetermined means
- Body discovered: September 25, 1988; Clermont, Florida, U.S.
- Known for: Formerly unidentified victim of suspected homicide
- Height: 5 ft 10 in (1.78 m)

Pamela Leigh Walton (died c. July–September 1988) was a transgender woman believed to have been murdered in Clermont, Florida, in 1988. Her remains remained unidentified for nearly 37 years until March 2025. She was thought to be a cisgender woman until DNA testing in 2015. Prior to her identification, she was known as "Julie Doe".

== Discovery ==
Walton's mummified remains were located at a roadside in the "Green Swamp" area of Clermont, Lake County, Florida, on September 25, 1988. A man looking for lumber made the initial discovery. The body was dragged to a concealed area, off the roadway of County Road 474, not far from the border between Lake and Polk Counties.

Walton wore a bluish-green tank top and an acid-washed denim skirt. The pantyhose she wore had been partially removed, suggesting that sexual assault may have taken place. No shoes, jewelry, or other personal items were found at the scene, including forms of identification. Investigators suspect murder because of the suspicious circumstances surrounding the placement of her body.

Based on the condition of the body, it was estimated that she had died about two to four weeks before the discovery. The remains were not in recognizable condition.

== Examination ==
Walton's remains were subject to an autopsy the morning after her discovery at the C.A. Pound Human Identification Laboratory in Gainesville, Florida, by William R. Maples. The cause of death could not be determined due to the level of decomposition.

The victim's hair was described as long and bleached a strawberry-blond color. She had long, manicured fingernails, which may have been artificial. Healed fractures were identified on her toes, one of her cheekbones, a rib, and possibly her nose. She was between 5 ft 9 in and 5 ft 11 in tall (1.75 and 1.80 m), weighing between 150 and 180 pounds (68 and 82 kg). She had also undergone cosmetic surgeries. She had 250cc silicone breast implants. The procedure may have been performed in Atlanta, Georgia; Miami, Florida; New Orleans, Louisiana; New York City; or California. It is believed the gender-affirming surgery occurred around 1984, based on the fact that the implants were discontinued around 1983. She apparently had a rhinoplasty, which may have been related to the injury she sustained to her nose. It was initially thought she had given birth at least once, based on evidence of pitting on the pelvis, attributed to hormonal changes.

The victim was initially believed to be a cisgender woman until a 2015 DNA test found XY chromosomes, showing that she would have been assigned male at birth and had transitioned or was in the process of transitioning, based on the cosmetic surgeries she had undergone. Additionally, she was taking hormone replacement medication, which caused changes to the pelvic bones, leading to the previous assumption she had a history of pregnancy.

In September 2024, the DNA Doe Project announced that she had ancestral ties to central Kentucky, specifically Madison, Fayette, Garrard, and Mercer counties, though she had spent most of her life in the Florida area. This indicated a possibility that she was not raised by her biological family.

== Investigation ==
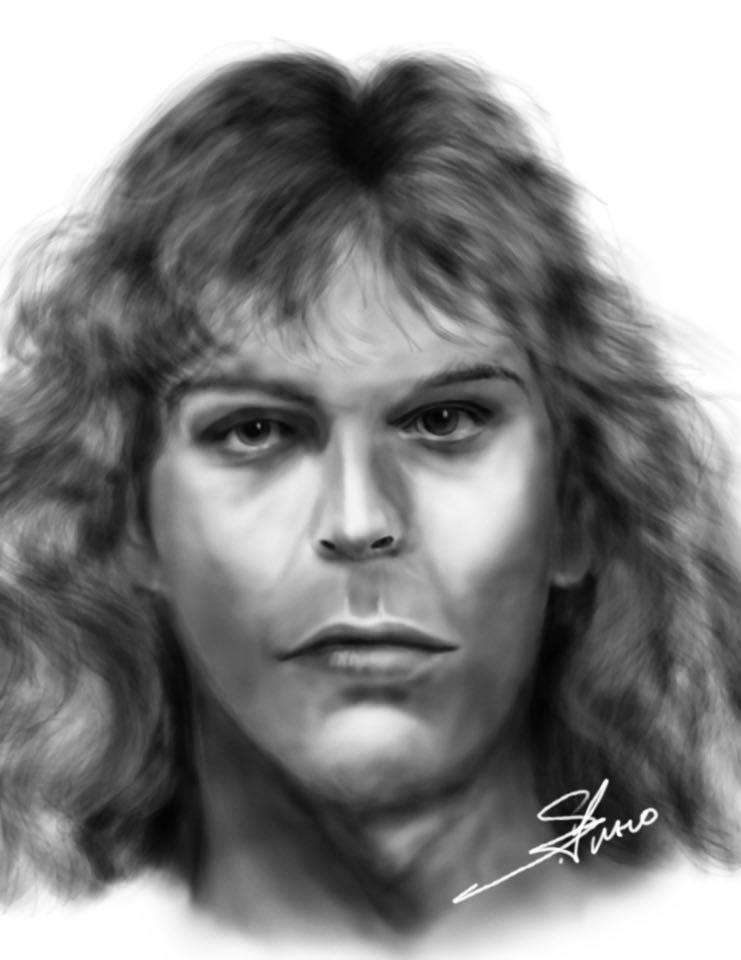
Facial reconstruction of Walton while she was unidentified

Shortly after the remains were discovered, fingerprints were taken in hopes of identifying the victim. An initial sketch was created to depict an approximation of her appearance in life. After the discovery that Pamela was a transgender woman, the sheriff's department commissioned a new forensic sketch to be created from the skull; retired detective and forensic artist Stephen Fusco created the image. This is also the time when she received her "Julie Doe" nickname. Students examining her remains selected the name "Julie" from the LGBT-themed film, To Wong Foo, Thanks For Everything! Julie Newmar.

In July 2018, isotopic tests were performed in Tampa, Florida, by the University of South Florida on samples from Pamela's skull to pinpoint potential locations where she resided. The results suggested that she originated from southern Florida. A sergeant working on the case voiced the possibility that the victim underwent challenges related to being a transgender woman during the 1980s. Others speculated that family estrangement or disownment may have played a role in her status as unidentified. As no missing individuals from this region matched her description, it was concluded her disappearance was likely unreported.

Investigators sought services from the DNA Doe Project, which specializes in identifying potential family members of unknown individuals through genetic genealogy. Two attempts, funded by the investigating agency, to extract enough DNA from the bones proved unsuccessful. The organization later began fundraising for a third attempt in November 2018, which also failed to generate a usable file. In January 2020, a suitable sample was successfully obtained for genealogical research after a fourth lab was consulted.

DNA Doe Project volunteers Lee and Anthony Redgrave founded the Trans Doe Task Force to advocate for unidentified victims who were transgender or gender non-conforming. The pair voiced concern that genetic genealogy research may reveal a decedent's birth and/or legal name but may not provide what title the individual preferred during life. One of the task force's goals is to research, following an identification, how the subject identified to prevent deadnaming. In 2024, the organization had setbacks with Facebook due to their public help posts about Walton being rejected fifteen times for over two weeks due to them being reported as spam and deceptive.

== Identification ==
On March 10, 2025, the decedent nicknamed "Julie Doe" was announced to have been identified as Pamela Leigh Walton. Walton was born in Kentucky on May 13, 1963, and adopted as a young child. In the mid-1980s, she had a falling out with her adoptive family over an alleged theft from a family member. As a result, Walton lost contact with her adoptive family, and they never reported her missing. Around July 6, 1988, she was arrested in Lexington, Kentucky, on one charge of prostitution, however the solicitation portion of the charge was dropped. Walton's movements between this point and the discovery of her body two and half months later on September 25, 1988, in Clermont, Florida, are unknown. Her suspected murder remains under investigation by police.

== See also ==
- List of unsolved murders (1980–1999)
