= Northwest Orient Airlines Flight 4422 =

1948 aviation accident

Coordinates: 62.213°N 144.127°W

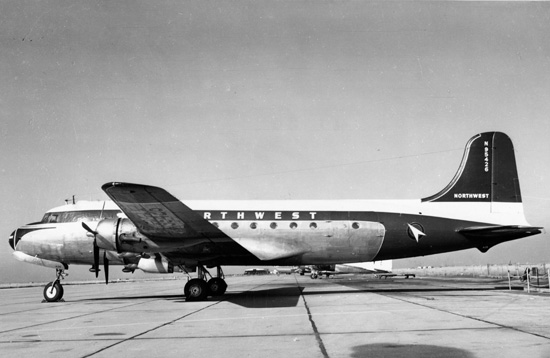
- A Douglas C-54 similar to the accident aircraft

Accident
- Date: March 12, 1948
- Summary: Controlled flight into terrain (CFIT)
- Site: Mount Sanford, Alaska Territory

Aircraft
- Aircraft type: Douglas C-54G-1-DO
- Operator: Northwest Orient Airlines
- Registration: NC95422 (formerly 45-513)
- Flight origin: Lunghwa Airport, Shanghai, China
- Stopover: Anchorage, Alaska
- Destination: LaGuardia Airport, New York City, New York
- Occupants: 30
- Passengers: 24
- Crew: 6
- Fatalities: 30
- Survivors: 0

On March 12, 1948, Northwest Orient Airlines Flight 4422 (NC95422) crashed into Mount Sanford, Alaska, with a crew of six and 24 passengers. The flight was a C-54 charter flying back to the United States from Shanghai. The aircraft refueled at Anchorage (Merrill Field) and took off at 8:12 P.M. to continue on to its destination, New York City (LaGuardia Airport). Instead of following the published airway, which detoured around Mount Sanford, the aircraft flew a direct line, crashing into the mountain. After the initial impact the wreckage slid down for about 3000 feet before coming to rest. There were no survivors. The passengers were American merchant mariners, crew members of the tanker SS Sunset, being ferried back home.

== Rediscovery of wreckage ==
Many witnesses in the nearby town of Gulkana, Alaska, saw the crash, and the wreckage was initially located from the air but was completely inaccessible at the time. Snowstorms quickly buried it in a mountain glacier, and it was lost for over 50 years. Over the years, various individuals, lured by rumors of a secret gold cargo shipment from China, searched the mountain and came home empty-handed. Northwest pilot Marc Millican and Delta pilot Kevin McGregor had been searching the mountain together and on their own since 1995.

In 1997 Millican and McGregor located a few pieces of wreckage but were unable to confirm it was from Northwest 4422. Only in 1999, after obtaining permission from the National Park Service and victims' relatives, were they able to remove wreckage confirming it was from Flight 4422. No secret treasure was ever found. At the time of the crash it was determined the pilots were 23 miles (37 km) off course and may not have seen the mountain at night. An NTSB investigation in 1999 shows the propellers were spinning at high velocity when they struck the mountain, which supports this theory.

In addition to wreckage discovered in 1999, a mummified left hand and arm was found in the Alaska glacier. After nearly a decade, identifiable fingerprints were recovered from the remains by Edward Robinson. The remains were then positively identified by Michael Grimm on September 6, 2007, using fingerprints, making this the world's oldest known identification of post-mortem remains using fingerprint identification. The limb was from Francis Joseph Van Zandt, a 36-year-old merchant mariner from Roanoke, Virginia, one of the passengers on Flight 4422. Subsequently, using DNA from a descendant of Van Zandt, Odile Loreille, an expert in DNA analysis, was also able to identify the remains using mitochondrial and Y-DNA identification. Only the remains of Francis Joseph Van Zandt were ever recovered or identified. The bodies of the remaining 29 individuals still await possible recovery.

== In popular culture ==
In 2013, Kevin A. McGregor published Flight Of Gold, a non-fiction account of the events of Flight 4422, the multiple previous efforts to locate and explore the crash site, and McGregor and Millican's search for the crash site and its rumored valuable cargo.

== See also ==
- 1947 BSAA Avro Lancastrian Star Dust accident – Airliner that crashed onto a mountain glacier in 1947 and remained undiscovered until 1998.
