= Armed Forces DNA Identification Laboratory =

Forensics laboratory run by U.S. Department of Defense

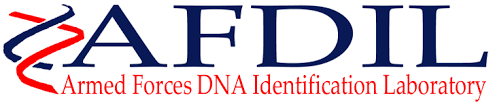
- Armed Forces DNA Identification Laboratory logo

Agency overview
- Formed: 1991
- Headquarters: Dover, Delaware
- Parent department: United States Department of Defense
- Website: DNA Identification Laboratory

Footnotes
- The laboratory is part of the Department of Defense DNA Operations

The Armed Forces DNA Identification Laboratory (AFDIL), established in 1991, is a forensics laboratory specializing in DNA profiling run by the United States Armed Forces and located at Dover Air Force Base, Delaware. Since 1992, it has been running the Family Outreach Program. AFDIL is accredited by the ANSI National Accrediation Board (ANAB) to the ISO 17025 accrediting standards and to the FBI's Quality Assurance Standards (FBI-QAS).

It is part of the Armed Forces Medical Examiner System (AFMES), under the Department of Defense (DOD) deoxyribonucleic acid (DNA) Operations often referred to as "DOD DNA Operations".

AFDIL stores refrigerated DNA samples from all current active duty and reserve personnel. However, almost all casualty identifications are effected using fingerprints from military ID card records (live scan fingerprints are recorded at the time such cards are issued). When friction ridge skin is not available from deceased military personnel, DNA and dental records are used to confirm identity.
