= Murder of Marcia King =

Formerly unidentified murder victim from Arkansas, United States

Marcia King
- Born: Marcia Lenore King; June 9, 1959
- Disappeared: c. 1980; Little Rock, Arkansas, U.S.
- Died: April 22, 1981 (aged 21); Troy, Ohio, U.S.
- Cause of death: Homicide by strangulation
- Body discovered: April 24, 1981
- Resting place: Riverside Cemetery, Troy, Ohio; 39.9660°N 84.3256°W (approximate)
- Height: 5 ft 5 in (1.65 m) (approximate)

Marcia Lenore Sossoman King (June 9, 1959 – April 22, 1981) was a 21-year-old Arkansas woman who was murdered in April 1981 and whose body was discovered in Troy, Ohio approximately 48 hours after her murder. Her body remained unidentified for almost 37 years before being identified via DNA analysis and genetic genealogy in April 2018. King was one of the first unidentified decedents to be identified via this method of forensic investigation.

Prior to her 2018 identification, King was informally known as "Buckskin Girl" and "Miami County Jane Doe". The first of these two names is in reference to the distinctive tasseled buckskin poncho she was wearing at the time of her discovery.

Following the identification of her body, Marcia King's family erected a new headstone at her grave in Riverside Cemetery, inscribed with her actual name. The investigation into her murder is ongoing.

== Discovery ==
On April 24, 1981, three young men discovered the body of a young Caucasian woman in a ditch alongside Greenlee Road in Newton Township, Troy, Ohio. One of the three men, Greg Bridenbaugh, initially noticed the decedent's distinctive buckskin poncho. Informing one of his companions, Neal Hoffman, to take a look at the coat, Hoffman walked closer to the article of clothing before turning toward Bridenbaugh, stating: "Oh my God, there's a woman in that coat!" (Note: These members of the public had first noticed the decedent's deerskin poncho lying alongside Greenlee Road before discovering her body.) The young woman was lying in a fetal position, on her right side, and without shoes or socks. The men immediately reported their discovery to police.

=== Autopsy ===
The decedent's body was autopsied on the afternoon of her discovery. The medical examination revealed she had suffered extensive blunt force trauma to the head and neck before she had been strangled to death approximately 48 hours before her body was discovered. Additionally, her liver was found to have been lacerated. She had not been subjected to any form of sexual assault.

The woman had been between 5 ft 4 in (163 cm) and 5 ft 6 in (168 cm) in height, aged between eighteen and twenty-six, and weighed 125–130 pounds (57–59 kg). She had naturally reddish-brown hair, which was parted in the middle and braided into pigtails on both sides of her head. Her eyes were light brown in color, and she had freckles across her face. In addition, her nose was described as being "very pointed". The victim also had a ruddy complexion, indicating she had spent a lot of time outdoors in the final weeks or months of her life.

The young woman had maintained a high level of personal hygiene. All her teeth, including her wisdom teeth, were in good condition and had no evidence of fillings or other dental work, except for one porcelain crown upon her upper-right incisor. The coroner also noted several scars upon her body, including a vertical scar beneath her chin, with other scars also visible upon one wrist, both arms, and one ankle.

=== Clothing ===
The young woman was dressed in blue bell-bottom Wrangler jeans, a brown turtleneck pullover sweater with an orange crisscross design on the front, a white brassiere and a hoodless deerskin poncho with purple lining, which appeared to be handmade. She wore no shoes or socks. No form of identification was located upon her body or at the crime scene.

== Initial investigation ==
Because the decedent's body was found approximately 48 hours after her death, police were able to obtain her fingerprints and dental information. The dental charts and fingerprints of this decedent yielded no results matching her to any known missing person, and her fingerprints matched no police records, indicating she had no criminal record. Early police efforts to identify this decedent also involved the creation of a composite drawing of her face which was published in local newspapers and broadcast on television networks on April 28, 1981. This initial media publicity surrounding the murder generated approximately two hundred leads. Although all were investigated, all failed to bear fruit.

The victim gradually became known as "Buckskin Girl" in reference to the distinctive tasseled buckskin jacket she was wearing when found. The failure to establish her identity hindered investigators' efforts to solve her murder. As her identity remained undiscovered, investigating authorities came to increasingly believe the reason Buckskin Girl remained unidentified had been due to the fact that she had been murdered far from her hometown. A retired investigator is also known to have expressed his belief the decedent was highly unlikely to have originated from the area where she was discovered.

Authorities strongly believed Buckskin Girl had been murdered elsewhere and her body discarded beside the road shortly after her death. This conclusion was supported by the fact her bare feet were clean, showing no indication of her having walked upon a dirty surface, and because Interstate 75 is just five miles (8 km) from where her body was recovered, making the site a convenient and discreet location to discard a body. Police and the media later speculated that she may have been a teenage runaway or a possible victim of a serial killer known to have murdered several prostitutes in the region during the 1980s and 1990s. However, her body had not been subjected to any form of sexual assault, indicating she was unlikely to have been a sex worker.

The investigation into Buckskin Girl's murder gradually became a cold case, although police and other officials continued to investigate her murder. Her clothing and other physical evidence recovered at the crime scene was retained, and a sample of her blood preserved.

== Theories ==
=== Lifestyle ===
Investigators theorized that Buckskin Girl had been a runaway teenager, a foster child, or a transient wanderer unlikely to have spent a significant period of time in Ohio prior to her death, although her high quality of personal hygiene strongly indicated that she had not lived as a vagrant. As her body was located close to a town road instead of a highway, the probability of her being a wanderer for a significant amount of time was considered to be negligible. The absence of her footwear at the crime scene led some investigators to believe she may have been murdered by an abusive partner.

A 2016 isotope analysis of the decedent's hair and fingernails revealed Buckskin Girl had spent approximately four months in areas within the Southwestern and/or Southeastern United States, as opposed to Ohio, prior to her murder, although forensic palynology had revealed she had most likely originated from either the Northeastern United States or Canada, or had spent a significant amount of time in these regions in the year prior to her murder.

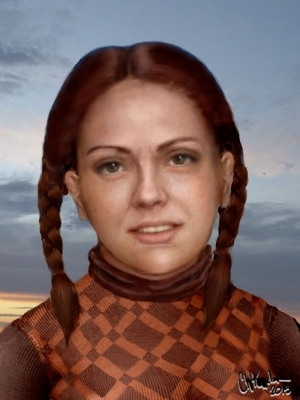
Forensic facial reconstruction of Buckskin Girl, depicting her distinctive braided hair

=== Link to other murders ===
Initially, investigators speculated regarding a potential connection between this decedent and the murder of a 27-year-old woman two months earlier, in February 1981, although police never officially linked these two murders.

In 1985, investigators tentatively linked the murder of Buckskin Girl to a nationwide series of murders of Caucasian women—several of whom were sex workers or erotic dancers—known as the Redhead Murders. However, this theory was eventually disproven.

Some investigators also speculated that Buckskin Girl may have been the first of numerous young women murdered by a suspected unidentified serial killer who perpetrated his known murders between 1985 and 2004—many of which were of known or suspected sex workers. (Note: These cases were originally linked by a reporter who had discovered similarities among nine nationwide unsolved murders of young women (the majority committed in Ohio).) This serial killer was suspected to have murdered between seven and ten other young women. All the victims of this suspected serial killer had been murdered via bludgeoning or strangulation, and items of clothing or jewelry were missing from each crime scene.

Jewelry and footwear were also missing from the crime scene of Buckskin Girl, and she had been murdered in a similar manner to these victims. However, several elements of evidence were found to contradict this theory. There was no indication Buckskin Girl had engaged in any form of sexual activity immediately prior to her death. In addition, unlike many of the victims of this serial killer, she was markedly well-groomed, with a history of dental care.

In 1991, a newly established task force convened in London, Ohio. This task force was dedicated to the investigation of these unsolved homicides, which had occurred in Ohio, New York, Pennsylvania and Illinois and composed of investigators from more than a dozen law enforcement agencies.

== Further forensic analysis ==
With advances in technology and the increasing use of DNA analysis in criminal investigations, investigators were able to extract the decedent's DNA from the blood sample preserved in 1981. This DNA sample was added to the growing number of law enforcement databases.

In 2001, the Miami Valley Regional Crime Laboratory generated a DNA profile of Buckskin Girl, this data was entered into the newly established National Missing and Unidentified Persons System (NamUs) database in 2008, through which her fingerprints, dental and DNA information were made nationally accessible to law enforcement. This data was able to conclusively rule out any possibility of 226 missing teenage girls and young women as Buckskin Girl. In 2009, a mitochondrial DNA sample was submitted to the FBI for inclusion within the Combined DNA Index System (CODIS).

The following year, the NamUs case management of Buckskin Girl was assigned to Elizabeth Murray, a Cincinnati based forensic anthropologist and professor of biology, who remained active in her pursuit of the decedent's identity.

2016 forensic facial reconstruction of Buckskin Girl, created by the National Center for Missing and Exploited Children, which was used heavily in contemporary media coverage.

=== Facial reconstruction ===
In April 2016, the National Center for Missing & Exploited Children released two versions of an updated forensic facial reconstruction of the victim and added her case to their website, depicting her with and without her braided pigtails. These images were extensively distributed via online media, although initially, no significant leads developed.

=== Pollen analysis ===
In 2016, the Miami County Sheriff's Office approved forensic palynology testing upon the victim's clothing in their efforts to identify her and her murderer(s). This testing was conducted by the U.S. Customs and Border Protection Agency. The results of this testing suggested Buckskin Girl had either originated within the Northeastern United States, or had spent a significant amount of time in this region in the year prior to her murder. Her clothing also contained high levels of soot from exposure to vehicular traffic and/or industrial activity, supporting investigators' initial suspicions she may have been a habitual hitchhiker. In addition, the pollen recovered from her external clothing suggested that, shortly before her murder, she had been in an arid climate such as the Western United States, or northern Mexico.

== Identification ==
On April 9, 2018, the Miami Valley Regional Crime Laboratory announced they had identified the decedent as 21-year-old Marcia Lenore King of Little Rock, Arkansas. Her identification had been achieved via DNA analysis conducted by the DNA Doe Project, with assistance from the Miami Valley Regional Crime Laboratory and Full Genomes Corporation. This organization had been contacted by Dr Murray in 2017, and was able to successfully match a sample of King's DNA to a sample submitted for comparison by a first cousin. Her family declined to release a press statement, requesting that their confidentiality be respected.

King had last been seen by her family in 1980. She had never officially been reported as a missing person, although her family had continued to search for her. It is believed King had frequently hitchhiked as a means of transportation, as investigators had long theorized prior to her identification. She is also known to have had ties with both Pittsburgh and Louisville, Kentucky. (Note: In the hope her daughter would initiate contact, King's mother had both continued to reside at the same house she lived in at the time of her daughter's disappearance, and kept the same phone number, should her daughter either return home or telephone her.)

Addressing the media to announce the formal identification of Buckskin Girl, a spokesman for the Miami County Sheriff's Office informed all present: "Law enforcement never forgets. We've had a long journey to [be] where we are today." This spokesman also emphasized the investigation into King's homicide is ongoing, with the primary focus being upon King's movements in the last month of her life, when she was known to have been in both Pittsburgh and Louisville.

=== Ongoing investigation ===
In July 2018, the Miami County Sheriff's Office announced they had received further information regarding King's actual whereabouts shortly prior to her death. This information included eyewitness accounts placing her in Louisville, Kentucky, approximately 14 days before her death. Six eyewitnesses have also corroborated accounts of King also being in Arkansas shortly before her murder. It is believed the reason she had traveled to Ohio may have been due to her suspected involvement with the religious organization The Way.

In February 2020, the Miami County Sheriff's Office announced they had been able to further reconstruct King's whereabouts, and relationships, in the two weeks prior to her murder, adding that as advances in technology now mean nuclear DNA samples can be retrieved from hair samples missing the actual root, they remained confident hair samples discovered at the crime scene and submitted to a renowned Californian paleogeneticist could yield a nuclear DNA profile of either her murderer, or an individual she had been in the company of very shortly before her death. Addressing these latest developments, Miami County Sheriff Dave Duchalk stated: "We always have hopes to bring justice for homicide victims and their families. We never have, nor will we ever forget, and will continually work the case and, as new technologies are developed, will review our evidence to learn if it is worth re-submitting."

"They were hopeful Marcia was going to come home. However, they are learning at this date that that's not going to happen."

— Miami County Sheriff Steve Lord, addressing the media to announce the formal identification of Buckskin Girl. April 2018.

== Funeral ==
King had been buried as a Jane Doe at Riverside Cemetery in Miami County, Ohio weeks after her death, with several officers assigned to investigate her murder serving as pallbearers at her funeral. Following the identification of her body, King's family chose for her to remain buried within this cemetery, with her stepmother, Cindy Sossoman, explaining her family's belief that it had been "God's plan" that their daughter was to be murdered and to remain unidentified for so long, they believed King was blessed to have died within a community which had shown such consideration and dignity to her while she had remained unidentified. Her parents had long since divorced, and her father, John Wesley Sossoman, had remarried, having several children with his second wife, all of whom had long wondered as to King's whereabouts and welfare.

On July 20, 2018, a memorial service for King was held at a chapel in Troy, Ohio. This service was officiated by the Reverend Gregory Simmons. Her new headstone was unveiled at this service. Marcia's father, John, had died on January 5, 2018, three months before she was identified. Her brother, Daniel King, and half-brother, Jonathan Sossoman, had also died by the time King's identity was discovered. Marcia's stepmother and eight other surviving family members replaced the headstone simply reading "Jane Doe" with a headstone bearing her actual name at this service, which was attended by over fifty local residents. Describing King's personality, her stepmother described her as a "very trusting" young woman, before informing all present: "Words don't describe the feelings we have for all of you, how you have loved her and taken her in your arms."

== See also ==
- Cold case
- Crime in Ohio
- The Doe Network
- Unidentified decedent
- List of solved missing person cases (1980s)
- List of unsolved murders (1980–1999)

== Cited works and further reading ==
- Halber, Deborah (2015). The Skeleton Crew: How Amateur Sleuths Are Solving America's Coldest Cases. New York: Simon & Schuster. ISBN 978-1-4516-5758-6.
- Katz, Hélèna (2010). Cold Cases: Famous Unsolved Mysteries, Crimes, and Disappearances in America. Santa Barbara: Greenwood Publishing Group. ISBN 978-0-313-37692-4.
- Latham, Krista E.; Bartelink, Eric J.; Finnegan, Michael (2017). New Perspectives in Forensic Human Skeletal Identification. San Diego: Academic Press. ISBN 978-0-12-805429-1.
- Murray, Elizabeth A. (2012). Forensic Identification: Putting a Name and Face on Death. Minneapolis: Twenty-First Century Books. ISBN 978-1-4677-0139-6.
- Newton, Michael (2004). The Encyclopedia of Unsolved Crimes. New York: Facts on File. ISBN 978-0-8160-7818-9.
- Pettem, Silvia (2017). The Long Term Missing: Hope and Help for Families. Maryland: Rowman & Littlefield. ISBN 978-1-4422-5680-4.
- Shoester, Maria (2006). Forensics in Law Enforcement. New York: Nova Science Publishers, Inc. ISBN 978-1-60021-164-5.
