= DNA Doe Project =

American nonprofit volunteer organization

- Formation: 2017
- Founders: Colleen M. Fitzpatrick and Margaret Press
- Headquarters: Sebastopol, California, United States
- Location: United States
- Volunteers: 60+
- Website: www.dnadoeproject.org

The DNA Doe Project (DDP) is an American nonprofit, volunteer organization that seeks to identify unidentified deceased persons (commonly known as John Doe or Jane Doe) using forensic genealogy. The unidentified deceased persons include victims of homicide, automobile accidents, or unusual circumstances, and persons who committed suicide under an alias. The group was founded in 2017 by Colleen M. Fitzpatrick and Margaret Press. Since the organization's founding, the DNA Doe Project has been credited with identifying over 150 unidentified decedents.

== History ==
Colleen M. Fitzpatrick, a physicist who worked with NASA and the US Department of Defense, was the founder of IdentiFinders, an organization that used Y-chromosomal testing to attempt to identify male killers in unsolved homicides. Margaret Press is a novelist who worked in computer programming and speech and language consulting. As a hobby, Press began working in genetic genealogy in 2007, helping friends and acquaintances find relatives, as well as helping adoptees find their biological parents.

In 2017, Fitzpatrick, Press, and a group of volunteers formed the nonprofit DNA Doe Project (DDP), a 501(c)(3) nonprofit organization based in Sebastopol, California. Working with law enforcement agencies, the organization uses genetic and traditional genealogy sources in conjunction with DNA from unidentified victims to build family trees through GEDmatch, a free public DNA database. In March 2018, the DDP announced it had solved its first case, the identification of the "Buckskin Girl" as Marcia Lenore Sossoman (King) (see below).

== Notable identifications ==
=== Marcia King, a.k.a. "Buckskin Girl" ===
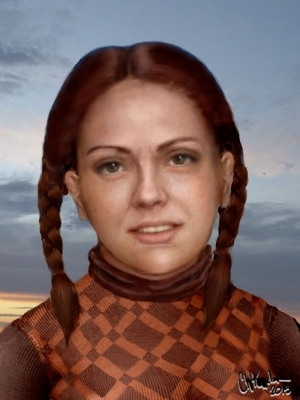
Postmortem rendering of Marcia King by Carl Koppelman

In 1981, three passersby found a female murder victim in a ditch in Troy, Ohio. Because the victim was found wearing a distinctive buckskin coat, she was given the name "Buckskin Girl" as the investigation continued. For decades, authorities sought the woman's identity, but to no avail.

At the 2017 American Academy of Forensic Sciences conference, Elizabeth Murray, an Ohio forensic anthropologist, met Colleen M. Fitzpatrick and Margaret Press, founders of the DDP, who discussed what genetic genealogy techniques could do for this case. The victim's body had long since been buried, but a vial of blood had been held in a lab for 37 years. The vial had not been refrigerated, however, resulting in the DNA becoming highly degraded, with only 50 to 75 percent of markers remaining. With the help of Greg Magoon, a senior researcher at Aerodyne Research, they were able to upload this DNA data to GEDmatch.

From this point, the DDP was able to identify the "Buckskin Girl", based on a very close DNA match (to a first cousin once removed). Her name was Marcia Lenore Sossoman (King) from Arkansas, aged 21 at the time of her death. DDP volunteers provided law enforcement with the name of a close relative of King's who lived in Florida. This relative volunteered a DNA sample that confirmed Sossoman's identity. This sample proved to be a match.

After 37 years, her mother was still living at the house where Sossoman had grown up. She had refused to move or change her phone number in hopes that her daughter might return or try to contact her.

=== "Lyle Stevik" ===
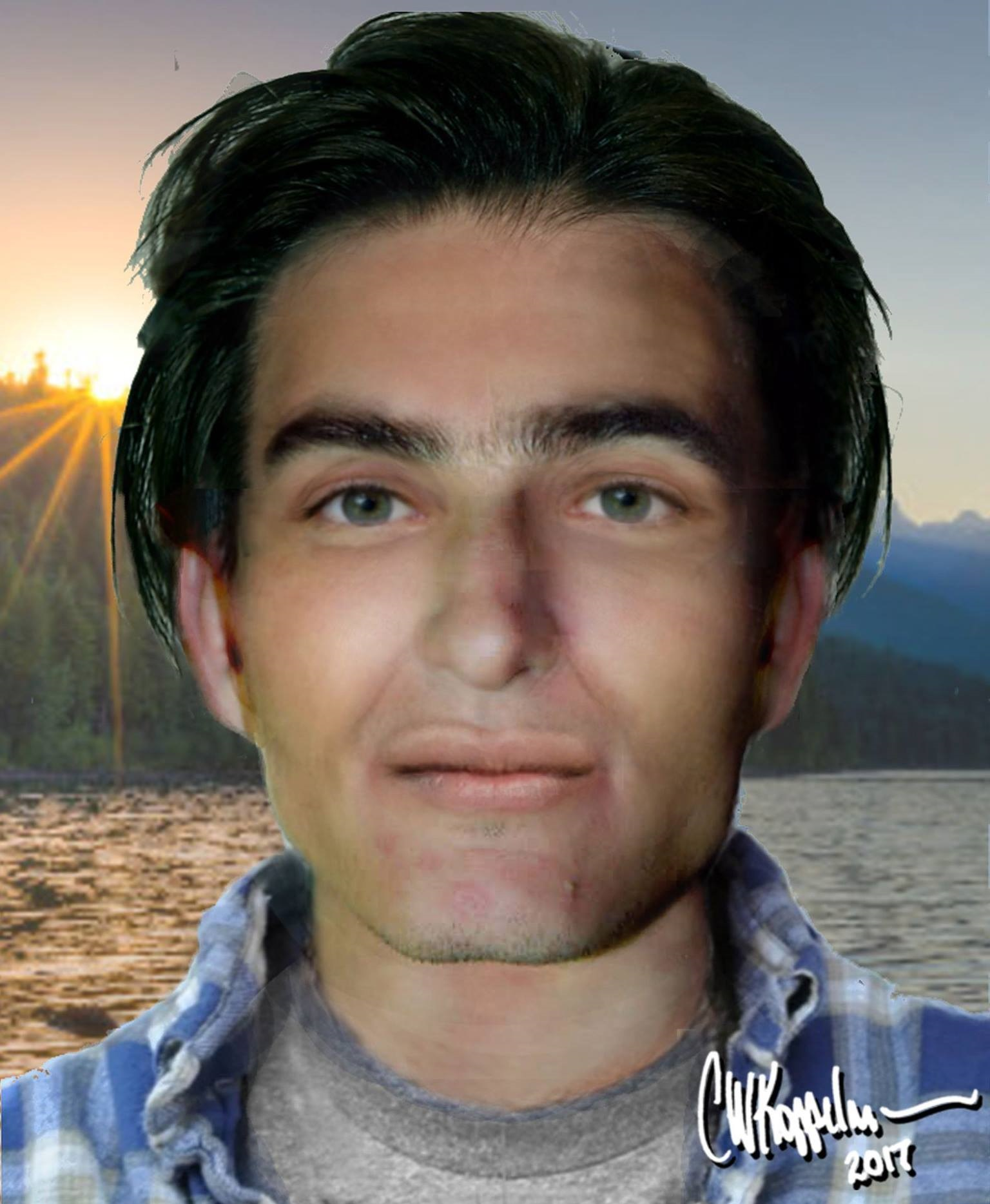
Reconstruction of "Lyle Stevik" by Carl Koppelman

In September 2001, a man was found to have hanged himself in a motel in Amanda Park, Washington, a town on the Olympic Peninsula. The man had checked in as "Lyle Stevik," which appeared to be an alias. This name appeared drawn from "Lyle Stevick", a character in the Joyce Carol Oates novel You Must Remember This (1987).

The Grays Harbor County Sheriff's Office spent countless hours in search of the man's true identity but to no avail.

In 2018, the DDP took the case at the request of the county sheriff's office. To raise the funds required to complete the necessary DNA analysis, the DDP set up its first-ever "Doe Fund Me" campaign on behalf of the victim. The campaign was a quick success, as, by this time, "Stevik" had gained internet fame among web sleuths. Adequate funds were raised within 24 hours. By March 22, 2018, DDP volunteers had obtained his DNA results and began analyzing through GEDmatch and related genetic genealogy research.

After about 20 volunteers put hundreds of hours into the case, they found a candidate in a 25-year-old young man from California. DNA tests indicated he was of mixed Native-American and Hispanic descent. Authorities contacted the man's family, who conclusively verified his identity using fingerprint samples taken in his childhood, having previously thought the man distanced himself from them. The family has requested that Stevik's identity remain private.

=== Robert Nichols, aka Joseph Newton Chandler III ===
Joseph Newton Chandler III, a resident of Eastlake, Ohio, committed suicide in his apartment on July 24, 2002. As authorities sought to identify his heirs, they discovered that his name and identity were fake. The real Joseph Newton Chandler III had died in a Sherman, Texas, car accident at age eight on December 21, 1945. The suicide victim had stolen the boy's identity in 1978 while living in South Dakota. Authorities began a search for the man's true identity.

Extracting DNA proved difficult, as the victim's remains had been cremated. In the year 2000, however, two years before his death, the victim had had a tissue sample taken for a medical treatment. Authorities obtained this sample, but genetic analysis of the sample using traditional law enforcement techniques yielded few clues. In 2016, authorities contacted IdentiFinders, a company run by Colleen M. Fitzpatrick, for help. In examining the man's Y-DNA signature, they determined that his true last name was likely "Nicholas" or some variation.

Chandler became the first case for the DDP. They analyzed the autosomal DNA of the highly degraded sample of the man's DNA, which had been stored in paraffin for about 15 years. Despite the obstacles and after over 2,500 hours of work, the DDP researchers were able to conclusively determine in June 2018 that Joseph Newton Chandler III was Robert Ivan Nichols, son of Silas and Alpha Nichols of New Albany, Indiana. This identification was verified when Robert's son, Phillip Nichols, volunteered a DNA sample, which proved to be a match.

=== Mary Silvani, aka "Washoe County Jane Doe" ===
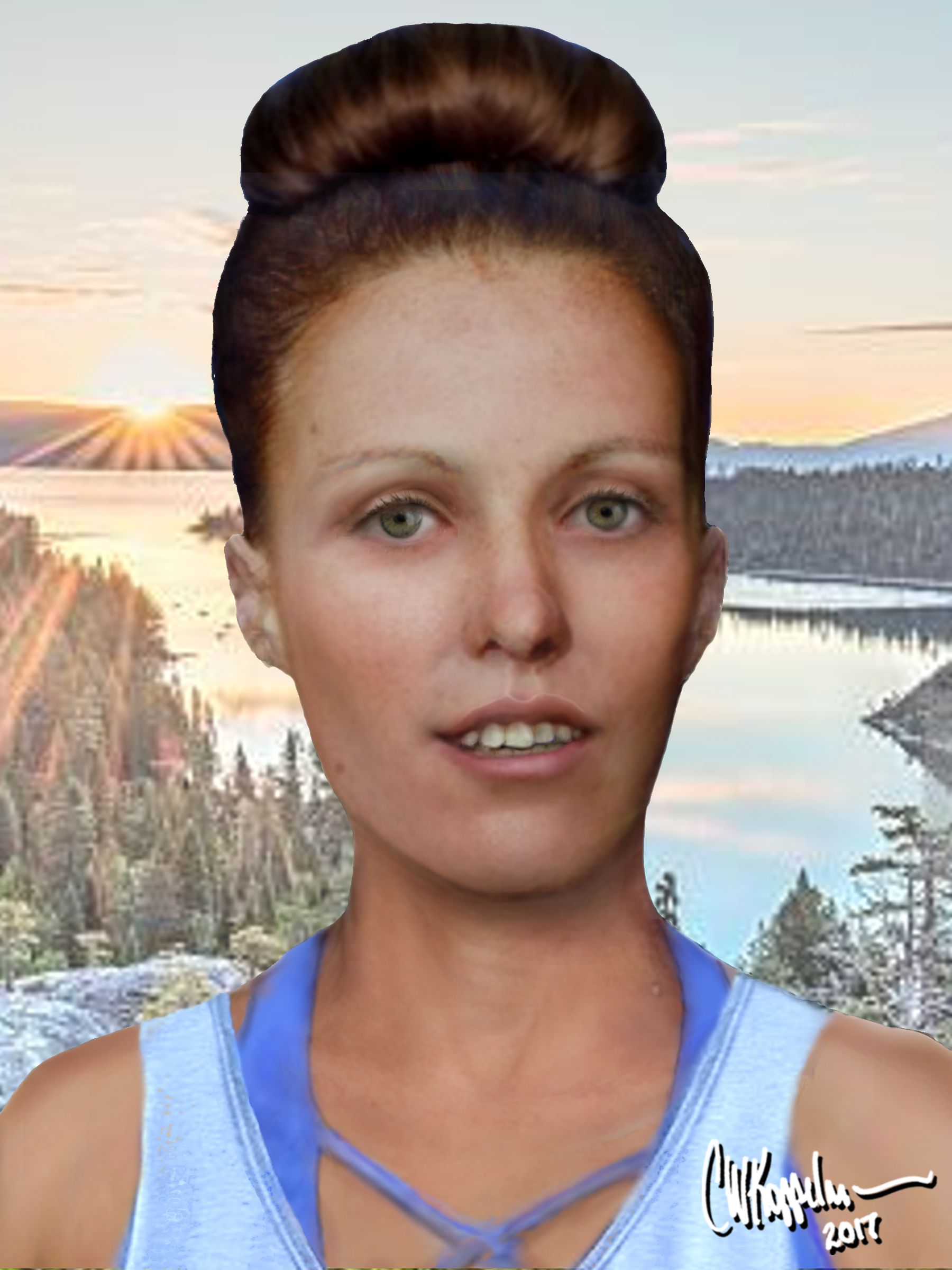
Postmortem rendering of Mary Silvani by Carl Koppelman

The body of a woman aged between 25 and 35 years was found by hikers on July 17, 1982, in Sheep Flats, Washoe County, Nevada. The woman had been shot in the back of the head as she was bending over, possibly to tie her shoes. The bullet hole on her head had been covered with men's underwear.

The victim wore a light pair of tennis shoes, a sleeveless blue shirt, jeans with a blue bikini bottom in a pocket, and a blue swimsuit underneath. The shirt had been sold at stores in California, Washington, and Oregon.

At the victim's autopsy, a vaccination scar was found on her left arm and another on her abdomen. In addition, one of her toenails had a large bruise underneath. Evidence from the style of dental work she had received indicated she may have lived in Europe at some point during her life. This theory has since been disproved. The woman had hazel eyes, was around five feet five inches (165 cm) in height, weighed 112 pounds (51 kg), and had brown hair tied back in a bun. As possible identities of the decedent, 231 people have been ruled out.

During the years when police struggled to identify her, she was known as "Sheep Flats Jane Doe" or "Washoe County Jane Doe".

In July 2018, it was announced she had been tentatively identified through genetic genealogy by the DDP. In September 2018, her identity was confirmed by the Washoe County Sheriff's Office. However, the sheriff's office withheld further information due to its ongoing homicide investigation.

In May 2019, the Washoe County Sheriff's Office announced that Washoe County Jane Doe is 33-year-old Mary Edith Silvani. She was born in Pontiac, Michigan, and grew up in Metro Detroit. She later moved to California as an adult.

The perpetrator, James Richard Curry, was also found through forensic genealogy. Curry committed suicide in prison the day following his arrest after being charged with another murder in January 1983.

=== Dana Dodd, aka "Lavender Doe" ===
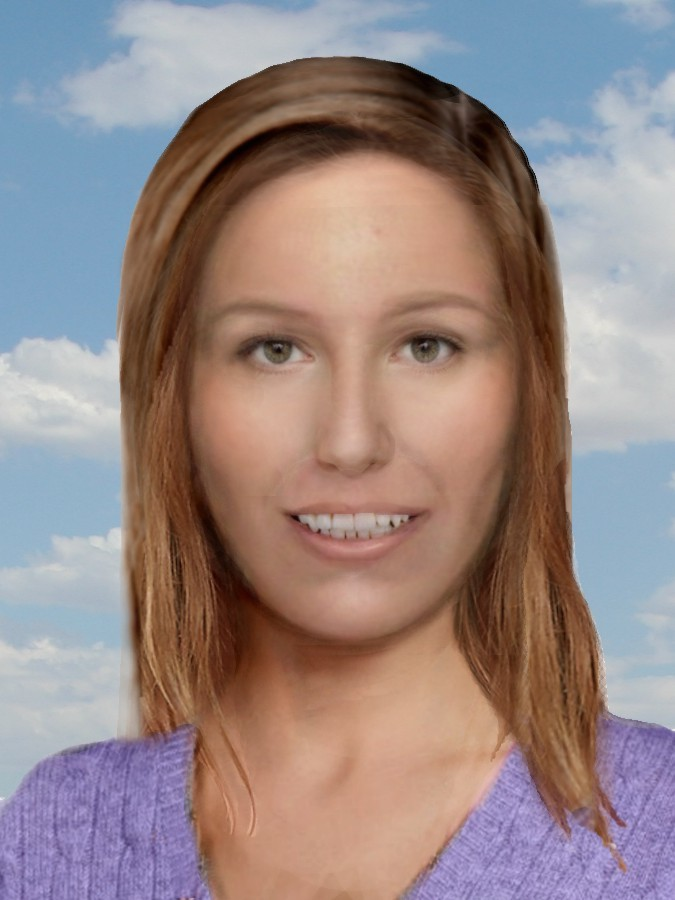
Reconstruction of Dana Dodd by Carl Koppelman

On October 29, 2006, the badly burned body of a female aged 17 to 25 was discovered in Kilgore, Texas. The victim's cause of death remained undetermined, yet the manner of death was ruled a homicide due to the body having been set on fire deliberately and the victim having been raped.

The DDP took the case in 2018. In January, the organization announced a tentative identification in the case, which would not be released until the suspect's trial concluded. Despite this, Dodd's identity was released on February 11, 2019. She was 21 and last seen in Jacksonville, Florida. Joseph Wayne Burnette, a long-term person of interest in the case, confessed to the murder in August 2018, leading him to be charged with her death (and that of another woman, 28-year-old Felisha Pearson).

=== Debra Jackson, aka "Orange Socks" ===
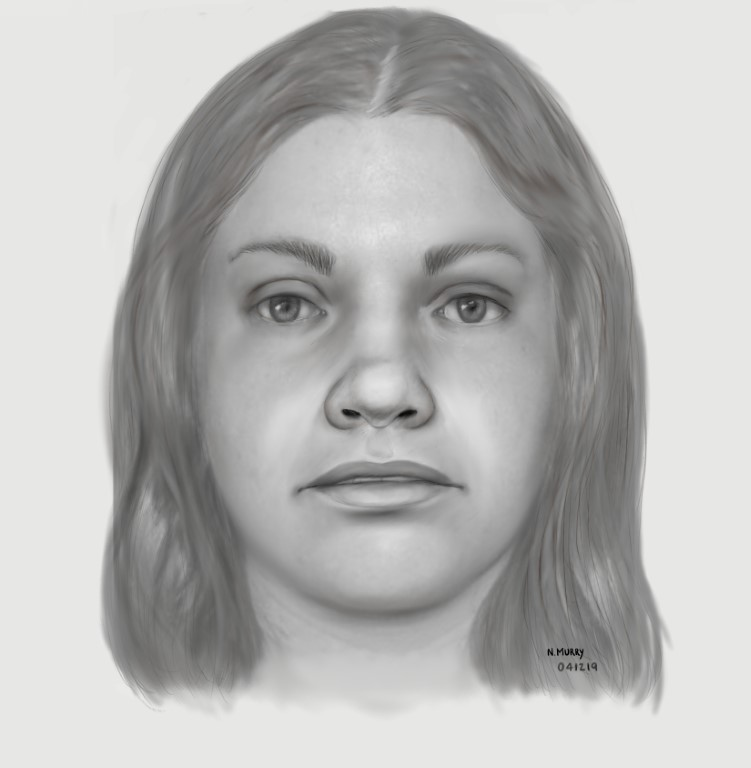
Postmortem rendering of Debra Jackson by Natalie Murry

Debra Jackson's body was found face-down and nude in a culvert along a highway in Georgetown, Texas, on October 31, 1979. She had been sexually assaulted and strangled. Along with the pair of socks on her body, she also wore an abalone/mother of pearl stone on a ring.

At the time, Jackson was believed to have been a transient or a runaway. Strong evidence supported this, as she had keys from an Oklahoma motel, long, dirty nails, insect bites (revealed to actually be impetigo scars post-identification), unshaven legs, and a makeshift sanitary pad. She had salpingitis due to having untreated gonorrhea.

Henry Lee Lucas confessed to her murder and was sentenced to death. It was later discovered that police officers from the area had him look at crime scene photos and then confess during interviews, which they would use to gain recognition for solving cold cases.

The DDP took on the case in 2018. On August 6, 2019, "Orange Socks" was identified as 23-year-old Debra Louise Jackson, who was from Abilene, Texas.

=== Joseph Henry Loveless, aka "Clark County John Doe (1979)" ===
The headless torso of a man was found in 1979, stashed in a burlap sack in Buffalo Cave, near Boise, Idaho. In 1991, a hand was located on the same site, leading to further excavations from which the other hand, one arm, and two legs were discovered. Identification was thought to be impossible, due to the missing head and the huge family tree of the deceased. However, thanks to an 87-year-old California man who agreed to take a DNA test, the remains were identified as those of his grandfather—bootlegger and accused murderer Joseph Henry Loveless. He had been accused of murdering his common-law wife, Agnes Loveless, on May 16, 1916, but had managed to escape imprisonment on May 18, 1916, by using a sawblade hidden in his shoe to cut the prison bar cells. It is unknown what happened to Loveless next, though it was reported in 1916, the year Loveless escaped prison, that he was discovered living at the outskirts of Dubois, Idaho, in a small-sized tent in the Idaho desert. The circumstances surrounding Loveless' death are, at present, suspected to be murder due to his torso and limbs being separated from his body, and his head and other arm being missing and nowhere to be found. However, it is believed that he died soon after his prison escape in May 1916, as he was found wearing the same clothing detailed in his wanted poster, with Loveless' cowboy-like hat, his brown coat, and his socks and shoes not being found with his remains in the cave his body was discovered in. Only his red maroon sweater and trousers were found, and a white-pinstripe collar shirt, not mentioned in the wanted poster, was found with the remains as well.

=== James Freund and Pamela Buckley, aka "Sumter County Does" ===
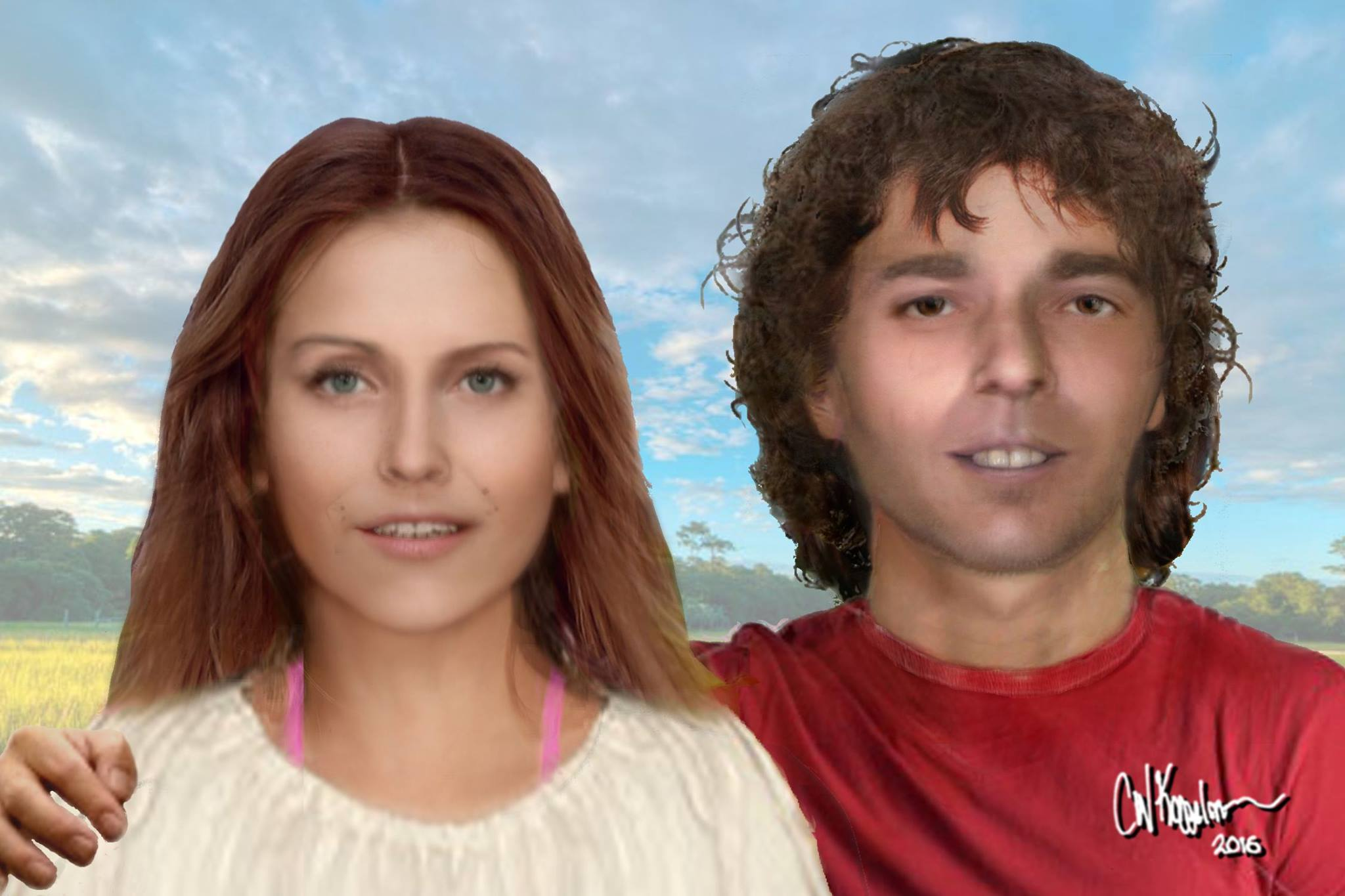
Reconstruction of Pamela Buckley and James Freund by Carl Koppelman

On August 9, 1976, a pair of young adults were found on a narrow frontage road between Sumter and Florence, South Carolina. They had been shot multiple times. The DDP was contacted on July 24, 2019, to assist with identification, and both were identified on January 19, 2021.

The male, nicknamed "Jock Doe", was identified as James Paul Freund, last seen in Lancaster, Pennsylvania.

The female was identified as Pamela Mae Buckley, last seen in Colorado Springs, Colorado.

=== Shirley Soosay, aka "Kern County Jane Doe (1980)" ===
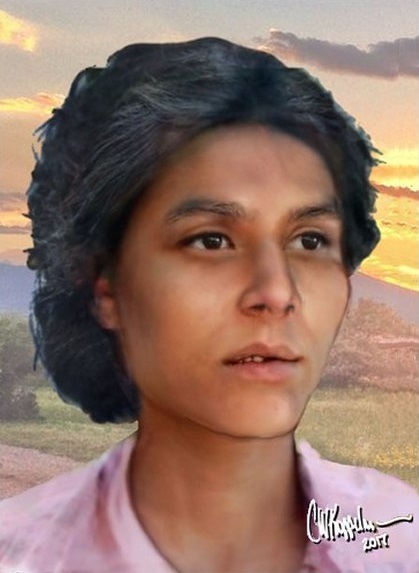
Reconstruction of Shirley Soosay by Carl Koppelman, which helped to aid in her identification

External image
- Photo of Shirley Soosay

On July 14, 1980, the body of a woman originally thought to be of Hispanic ethnicity was found in an almond orchard in Delano, California. She had been sexually assaulted, stabbed to death, and deceased for approximately one day. She was estimated to be five feet four inches (163 cm) tall and weighed 115 pounds (52 kg). She had shoulder-length brown hair and brown eyes, as well as two professionally done tattoos, one of a heart with the name "Shirley" inside, and the words "Love you" and "Seattle" on one arm, and the other of a rose with the words "Mother" and "I love you" above and beneath the rose, respectively, on the other arm. She was found wearing a pink blouse, a pair of blue denim pants, blue socks, white slip-on shoes, a white panty girdle, and multicolor panties. She may have used the names "Becky" or "Rebecca Ochoa" and may have been employed at an apple orchard.

In 2015, it was announced that DNA found on the woman's body, as well as DNA from a woman found in Ventura County, California, were linked to murderer Wilson Chouest. He was convicted in 2018 of their murders and sentenced to life in prison. Chouest claimed that he did not know the victims.

The DDP was tasked with assisting in the woman's identification in July 2018, but genealogy research did not begin until May 2019. It was discovered at that point that the decedent was not Hispanic but of First Nations ancestry, most likely Cree. On April 23, 2021, it was announced that Kern County Jane Doe had been identified as Shirley Ann Soosay of Maskwacis, Alberta, Canada, after Soosay's niece recognized a reconstruction of her on a public outreach announcement by the DDP. Soosay is one of the first decedents of First Nations ancestry to be identified by forensic genealogy, as well as the first to be identified after the project reached out to the public for potential leads.

=== John Brandenburg Jr., aka "Brad" and Keith Bibbs, aka "Adam Doe" ===
External images
- Photo of John Brandenburg Jr.
- NCMEC Reconstruction (Note: remains were skeletal upon discovery, so hair style was an estimation)

On October 18, 1983, the bodies of four young men were discovered partially buried in a shallow grave near US 41 in rural Newton County, Indiana, by a pair of mushroom hunters. Each victim was discovered to have been buried for several months, buried face upward, with sections of their bodies exposed and loosely covered in loose soil and brush. The victims were linked to a serial killer known as the "Highway Murderer". One victim wore a parka, while the others wore clothing implying that they had died in the spring or summer. Two of the victims were soon identified as Michael Bauer and John Bartlett—both murdered in March 1983. The DDP was tasked with the identifications of both unidentified decedents—known as "Adam" and "Brad"—in late 2020 and March 2021, respectively.

The individual responsible for all four murders was later identified as Larry Eyler, who ultimately confessed to having murdered 22 young men across the Midwestern US. Eyler later confessed to his attorney that he had met the two unidentified victims by chance, and that "Brad" had been introduced to him by his alleged accomplice, Robert Little, in mid- or late-May 1983.

"Brad" was found to be a young white male, most likely aged between 17 and 28 years old. He was between 5 feet 11 inches and 6 feet 1 inch (180 and 185 cm) tall and weighed between 130 and 180 pounds (59 and 82 kg). He had medium length, reddish or auburn, wavy hair. He had received several dental fillings and had severely fractured his nose and left ankle during his life. He also had two known tattoos on his right forearm: one a crudely inscribed cross with two circular marks, the other a rectangle or U-shape with a single circular mark. On April 2, 2021, DNA from this individual was uploaded to GEDmatch. Less than a month later, "Brad" was conclusively identified as 19-year-old John Ingram Brandenburg Jr. of Chicago, Illinois.

"Adam" was found to be a young black male, believed to be as young as 15 or possibly in his early 20s. He had short-cut, black hair, was between five feet eight inches and six feet two inches tall and had several dental fillings. The decedent wore distinctive clothing, including a red and black belt inscribed with the word "devil" multiple times. On July 24, 2023, the DNA Doe Project, working together with the Identify Indiana Initiative and the Indiana State Police Lab, identified the victim as 16-year-old Keith Lavell Bibbs of Chicago, Illinois. Othram also assisted in this identification.

=== Francis Wayne Alexander, aka "Body 5" ===
Francis Wayne Alexander (b. March 11, 1955) was one of the final six unidentified victims of serial killer John Wayne Gacy. His remains were recovered from the crawlspace of Gacy's house in Norwood Park Township, Cook County, Illinois, on December 26, 1978, and labeled simply as Body 5, as his were the fifth set of remains unearthed from beneath Gacy's property. His identification was announced on October 25, 2021. Alexander had been living in Chicago at the time of his death but was originally from North Carolina.

Alexander's precise date of death is estimated to have occurred anytime between early 1976 and March 15, 1977. However, no evidence exists of his being alive after 1976. Moreover, the fact the trench in which his body was discovered was dug by Gacy employee and victim Gregory Godzik shortly after the commencement of Godzik's employment at Gacy's contracting firm on or about November 22, 1976, and before Godzik's own murder on December 12, 1976, indicates Alexander's death most likely occurred between November 1976 and March 15, 1977 (the date the victim discovered directly above the body of Alexander was murdered).

=== Carl "Junior" Isaacs Jr., aka "Rock County John Doe" ===
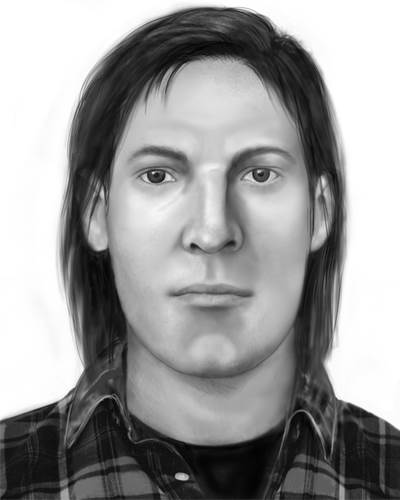
2014 reconstruction of Isaacs by the Federal Bureau of Investigation

On November 26, 1995, the skeletal remains of a young man were found by hunters in a wooded area along Turtle Creek in Bradford, Wisconsin, near Clinton. His skeleton was lying on his stomach with his arms up over his head. The man was dressed in a plaid flannel jacket, a black Venom concert T-shirt, boxer underwear with a Bart Simpson design, and gray urban camouflage fatigues. The jacket partially covered the man's head and back. One black 1994 Nike Air Bond basketball shoe lay beside the skeleton. The man carried a pendant made from a dinner fork, shaped like the head of a goat. Other items found with the body were cigarette butts, a Budweiser disposable butane lighter with the caption "Proud to be Your Bud" printed on it, a tube of Carmex lip balm, and a black Aquatech watch. The official cause and manner of death remain undetermined. Investigators believe the young man passed out or went to sleep and was overcome by hypothermia.

The DDP was contacted in 2018 to help identify the young man. They announced a tentative identification in 2019. The man had been identified after only two weeks of genetic genealogy, however a confirmation of his identity did not occur until 2022. Margaret Press, co-founder of DDP, explained that there was no living relative close enough to meet the standards of the medical examiner. In 2019, the University of North Texas performed additional testing on the man's half-siblings. In 2021, the man's father was exhumed to provide bone samples for researchers to compare with the young man and his half-siblings.

On June 14, 2022, the Rock County Sheriff's Office announced the identification of the decedent as Carl Junior Isaacs Jr. of Delavan, Wisconsin. On April 16, 1995, Isaacs escaped from his mother's home in Walworth where he was under house arrest while serving a 5-year prison sentence for the 1991 burglary and vandalism of the Delbrook Golf Course in Delavan. He was immediately served with an arrest warrant for violating probation by a Walworth County judge that was renewed through August 2018. The investigation into the manner and circumstances surrounding Isaacs' death is ongoing.

=== Pamela Leigh Walton, aka "Julie Doe" ===
Walton's remains were discovered by a man searching for lumber in Clermont, Lake County, Florida on September 25, 1988. In 2015, DNA testing revealed that she was assigned male at birth. Additionally, she was taking hormone replacement medication, which caused changes to the pelvic bones that lead the investigators to believe that she had a history of pregnancy. Investigators requested DNA Doe Project's help around 3 years later. In March 2025, she was identified as Pamela Leigh Walton of Kentucky.

=== Rea Rasmussen, aka "Bear Brook Jane Doe 2000" ===
Rea Rasmussen's body was discovered in a barrel at Bear Brook State Park near Allenstown, New Hampshire on May 9, 2000. She was one of four females (one adult, three children) who had died of blunt force trauma to the head discovered in two barrels at the park between 1985 and 2000. They were all believed to have been murdered at around the same time.

In 2017, Terry Peder Rasmussen, also known by many aliases including Bob Evans, was identified as the prime suspect as well as the father of the middle child. All four remained unidentified until 2019, when DNA profiling identified three of the victims as Marlyse Elizabeth Honeychurch and her two daughters of different biological fathers, Marie Elizabeth Vaughn and Sarah Lynn McWaters. Rasmussen, who died in prison in 2010 while serving a 15 year to life prison sentence for an unrelated murder, was dating Honeychurch when she left her family in California with her two daughters in 1978. Rasmussen left New Hampshire and returned to California in 1981. In September 2025, the DNA Doe Project identified the final Bear Brook Jane Doe as Rea Rasmussen, born in 1976 in Orange County, California. Her biological mother, Pepper Reed who disappeared from California in the late 1970s is also a suspected victim of Rasmussen.

== Other case involvements and collaborations ==
In 2022, the DDP partnered with Intermountain Forensics on the 1921 Tulsa Identification Project, the goal of which is to identify victims of the 1921 Tulsa race massacre. In 2024, Tulsa's city government announced the Project's first successful identification, a World War I veteran from Georgia named C.L. Daniel.

Press and Fitzpatrick worked with Lawrence Wein, professor of operations, information, and technology at Stanford Graduate School of Business and Mine Su Ertürk, a PhD student, on a paper proposing a new mathematical search method to help genealogists in forensic genealogy investigations.

In 2024, the Cuyahoga County Medical Examiner's Office and the DDP began a collaboration to identify the remaining Cleveland Torso Killer’s unidentified victims.

== See also ==
- Operation Identify Me
- Othram
- Trans Doe Task Force
- Unidentified decedent
