= Investigative genetic genealogy =

Application of genealogy in a legal setting

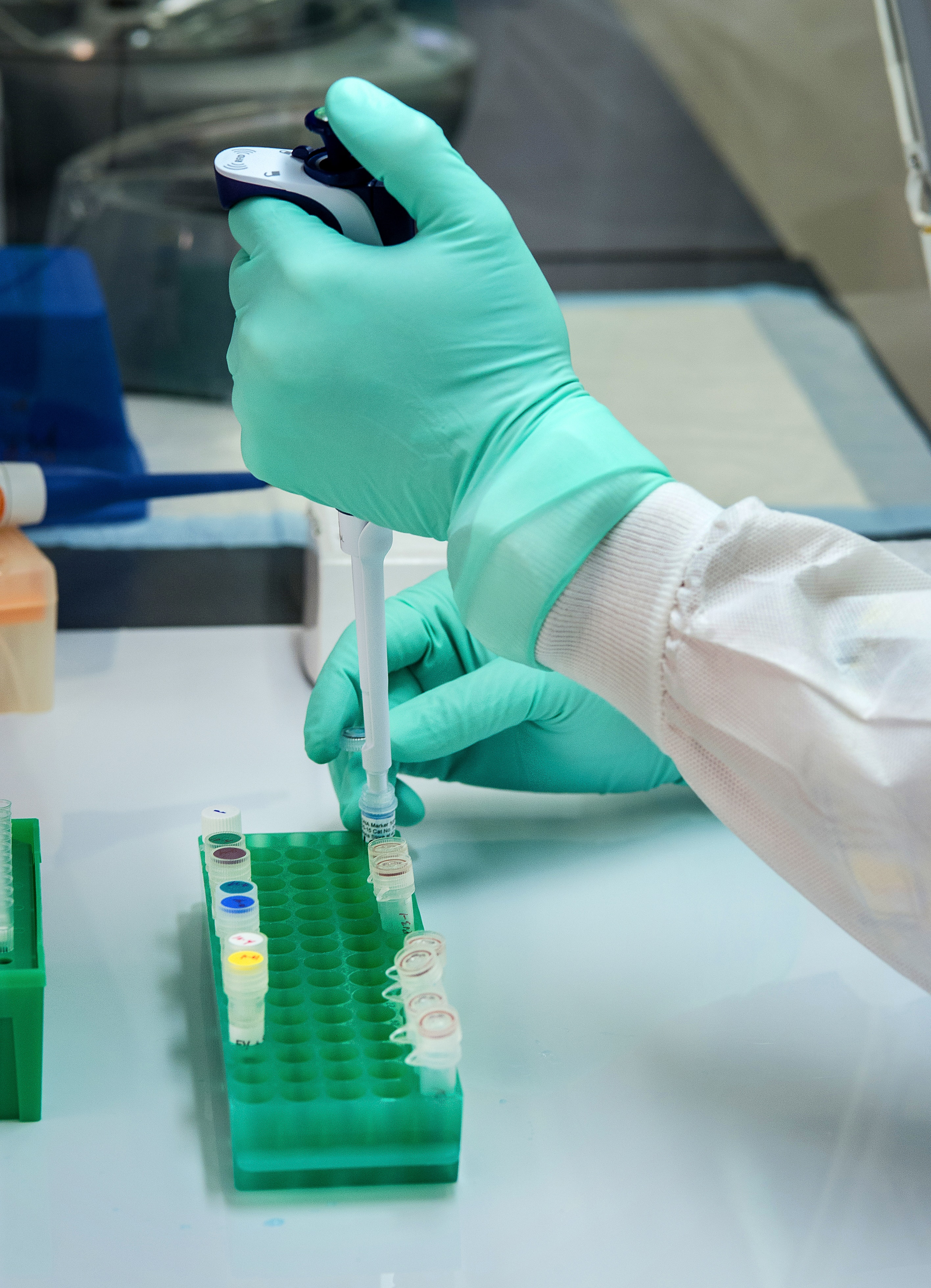
CDC Lab testing

Investigative genetic genealogy (IGG), also known as forensic genetic genealogy (FGG), and forensic investigative genetic genealogy (FIGG) is the emerging practice of utilizing genetic information from direct-to-consumer genetic testing companies for identifying suspects or victims in criminal cases. As of December 2023, the use of this technology has solved a total of 651 criminal cases, including 318 individual perpetrators who were brought to light. There have also been 464 decedents identified, as well as 4 living Does. The investigative power of genetic genealogy revolves around the use of publicly accessible genealogy databases such as GEDMatch and Family TreeDNA. On GEDMatch, users are able to upload their genetic data from any direct-to-consumer company in an effort to identify relatives that have tested at companies other than their own.

Identifying unknown subjects through investigative genetic genealogy is done through the use of analysis of identity-by-descent (IBD) segments of DNA that indicate shared ancestors. Data available in GEDMatch, which is composed of genetic profiles from approximately 1.2 million individuals, has proven capable of identifying a third cousin or closer in over 90% of the population. This information, used in tandem with demographic identifiers like age, gender, and place of residence and other publicly available records, is sufficient for identifying any person who has a fifth cousin or closer within a publicly accessible genetic genealogy database.

Law enforcement agencies have leveraged the access to public databases by uploading crime-scene genealogy data and inferring relatives to potential suspects. Family tree assembly and analysis of demographic identifiers is then carried out by genetic genealogy experts, either working directly for law enforcement agencies or through one of the many US companies that have been set up to work on these cases. Parabon Nanolabs and Othram are the most well known companies working in this field. By January 2021 Parabon claimed to have used genetic genealogy to produce an investigative lead in over 200 cases. The DNA Doe Project, a non-profit organization, have also been instrumental in resolving unidentified remains cases, many of whom are victims of violent crimes.

== Field Application ==
There are more uses to investigative forensic genealogy than cold cases or cases otherwise deemed "unsolvable" by law enforcement. Natural disasters such as floods, wildfires, earthquakes are all prime examples of scenarios where gene-matching can be utilized. In instances where the body is unidentifiable by standard means, such as facial recognition or dental records, genetic technology can be used.

Law enforcement investigators have used the technique to identify nearly 40 women as the mothers of newborn infants who were found dead around the country, most of them decades ago. In most of the cases reviewed by The New York Times, women who were matched by DNA to a dead newborn were charged with murder. Some of the women who have been identified in these Baby Doe cases say they did not know they were pregnant until they went into labor. Some of the women who have been charged told the police their baby was stillborn. At least two women among the dozens of cases reviewed by The New York Times took their own lives after being approached by investigators armed with DNA evidence. Some were sentenced to decades in prison, while others got lighter sentences, often after pleading guilty to lesser charges like manslaughter. A handful of the women avoided prison time altogether. Civil rights advocates, doctors and defense lawyers say the new technique is raising questions that the courts are not yet prepared to answer.

A number of living doe situations have also been solved this way. There is push to provide more resources for DNA to be offered when there is a need to identify a child who has been trafficked, or an adult who was trafficked at a young age.

Agencies that fall under the US Department of Justice, who have jurisdiction on the case(s) and/or person(s), can utilize forensic genetic genealogical DNA analysis and searching, FGGS for short. The DOJ published an interim policy in 2019 that sets parameters for law enforcement's use of FGGS, though it only provides internal guidance and does not limit the DOJ's investigative actions that would otherwise be lawful even if in violation of the policy. For example, FBI investigators in the 2022 Idaho student murders allegedly skirted the DOJ policy in pursuit of the suspect.

== Complications ==
The use of investigative genetic genealogy has been central in numerous high-profile cases, namely in the identification and ultimate arrest of Joseph DeAngelo, the Golden State Killer. Despite its apparent success, the growing use of genetic genealogy databases by law enforcement agencies has not avoided serious scrutiny. A year prior to the arrest of DeAngelo, an individual was wrongly identified as a suspect in the murder of Angie Dodge, an 18-year-old woman who was the victim of a 1996 murder in Idaho Falls, Idaho. Michael Usry was the subject of a police investigation that led to a court order requiring Ancestry.com to disclose the identity of a partial match to crime scene DNA. This partial match was Usry, who was ultimately cleared as a suspect after police secured a warrant for his DNA. This DNA test proved that he was not a full match to the perpetrator.

=== Privacy Implications ===
==== Fourth Amendment ====
The use of genetic genealogy databases by investigators has initiated a debate over the Fourth Amendment implications of genealogy data. The Fourth Amendment states that a warrant is required in situations that violate an individual's reasonable expectations of privacy. Given the sensitivity of information within direct-to-consumer genealogy databases, particularly concerning medical traits, behavioral tendencies, ethnic background, and familial associations, consumers may assume that they have a reasonable expectation of privacy in the information contained within those databases. A number of legal scholars have argued similarly that the Fourth Amendment should protect privacy interests in the IGG process while balancing law enforcement's legitimate interest in solving crime. However, other legal scholars have argued the opposite, and most courts faced with a challenge to IGG from a criminal defendant have found that the Fourth Amendment does not protect consumers' or their relatives' information because they have no reasonable expectation of privacy in that information.

The foundation for this determination is the third-party doctrine established by the US Supreme Court, which states that a person “has no legitimate expectation of privacy in information…voluntarily turn[ed] over to third parties.” Because consumers voluntarily share their information with the direct-to-consumer company and/or the public genealogy database, finding Fourth Amendment protection for either suspects or relatives implicated in IGG cases would require the Supreme Court to expand its carve-outs to the third-party doctrine.

==== Company Privacy Policies ====
Currently, direct-to-consumer companies do not promise complete protection of user data. 23andMe, a leading consumer genealogy company, states in its privacy policy that "23andMe will not provide information to law enforcement unless required by law to comply with a valid court order, subpoena, or search warrant."

In an effort to remain transparent to its consumers, 23andMe has a semi-annual Transparency Report. This report identifies the number of government requests for user data in addition to the number of times data has been produced without the explicit consent of the individual(s) of interest. 23andMe claims to have never produced user data without consent. The other industry leader, Ancestry.com, takes an analogous stance on the privacy of user data and similarly provides an annual transparency report. In August 2025, Ancestry updated its policy on the use of their database for law enforcement purposes, effectively banning its use.

The direct-to-consumer genealogy company FamilyTreeDNA faced a backlash following an admission that they were working secretly with the FBI. This partnership was initiated in 2018 and had the goal of solving cold cases involving murder and rape. Following scrutiny, FamilyTreeDNA's president Bennett Greenspan apologized for a lack of transparency, stating "I am genuinely sorry for not having handled our communications with you as we should have".

GEDMatch, a public genealogy database, faced intense media attention after the arrest of the Golden State Killer because at the time, the company's policy did not permit such access to consumers' information. Following public scrutiny, GEDMatch changed their terms of service to require individuals to opt-in to the use of their profiles by third parties. Shortly after, GEDMatch caved to law enforcement pressure to expand its definition of a "violent crime," which triggered law enforcement's ability to access consumer information. Four years later, an investigation revealed that genetic genealogists working with law enforcement had been accessing opted-out profiles anyways by exploiting a loophole in the platform.

=== State Regulation of IGG ===
Three states, Maryland, Montana, and Utah, have enacted laws that limit law enforcement's ability to initiate and access certain information during the IGG process. More than a dozen states have enacted some form of a statute that regulates the direct-to-consumer genetic testing company or database, restricting when it may turn over customer information to law enforcement. However, the majority of states have done nothing at all.

== Potential for Supplementing the FBI's CODIS System ==
The US government's own Combined DNA Index System (CODIS) database is composed of forensic evidence accessible to local, state, and federal law enforcement officials. This database consists of genetic profiles of approximately 18 million different people, however these are limited to DNA samples from convicted felons and arrestees. Data on the racial distribution of profiles suggests that 8.6% of the entire African American population is present in the database compared to only 2% of the white population.

On the other hand, genetic profiles from direct-to-consumer databases and GEDMatch consist of 75% white individuals from Northern European descent. The vast overrepresentation of African American individuals within the CODIS database has rendered it relatively ineffective for solving serial murder and sexual assault cases, of which the majority of perpetrators are white. Based on data from 4,700 mass murderers, 57% of serial killers are white whereas only 29% are African American. It has been suggested that the use of investigative genetic genealogy, which relies heavily on databases like GEDMatch, would therefore help to reduce racial disparities in the current criminal justice system. However, in practice it has been found that the majority of victims identified through this technique were white.

== Investigative Genetic Genealogy Centers ==
The world's first Investigative Genetic Genealogy Center was launched at the Ramapo College of New Jersey in December of 2022. The center offers student workshops, certificate programs, and bootcamps for interested practitioners around the world. The center was established by David Gurney and Cairenn Binder. In June 2026, Cairenn Binder announced David Gurney's departure from the IGG center on the Ramapo College IGG website. Cairenn Binder was promoted to director of the IGG center and Monique Platt was hired to serve as director of the IGG certificate program.

== See also ==
Public genealogy databases known to have been used in IGG:

- FamilyTreeDNA
- GEDMatch
- MyHeritage

Genetic genealogy laboratories known to assist with IGG:

- Othram, Inc.
- Parabon NanoLabs
