= Joseph Newton Chandler III =

Formerly unidentified American identity thief (1926–2002)

Robert Ivan Nichols
- Nichols's 1999 driver's license photo
- Born: Robert Ivan Nichols; September 12, 1926; New Albany, Indiana, U.S.
- Disappeared: c. 1965; Napa, California, U.S.
- Died: c. July 23, 2002 (aged 75); Eastlake, Ohio, U.S.
- Cause of death: Suicide by gunshot
- Resting place: Riverside Cemetery, Painesville, Ohio, U.S.
- Other name: Joseph Newton Chandler III
- Known for: Formerly unidentified identity thief
- Height: 5 ft 7 in (1.70 m)
- Spouse: Laverne Korte (m. 1947; div. 1964)
- Children: 3
- Military career
- Branch: United States Navy
- Conflicts: World War II: Bombing of USS Aaron Ward
- Awards: Purple Heart

Robert Ivan Nichols, alias Joseph Newton Chandler III (September 12, 1926 – c. July 23, 2002), was a formerly unidentified American identity thief who committed suicide in Eastlake, Ohio, in July 2002. After his death, investigators were unable to locate his family; they discovered that he had stolen the identity of the real Chandler who died in a Texas car crash in 1945 at the age of eight. The lengths to which Nichols went to hide his identity had led to speculation that he was a fugitive.

In late 2016, the U.S. Marshals Service, Cleveland, Ohio, announced that forensic genealogist Colleen M. Fitzpatrick of Identifinders International had compared the then-unidentified man's Y-STR profile to public genetic genealogy Y-STR databases to determine his possible last name was "Nicholas". In March 2018, the DNA Doe Project identified the man as Robert Ivan Nichols. The U.S. Marshals Service announced the identification at a press conference in Cleveland on June 21, 2018.

== Background ==
=== Nichols's life and identity theft ===
Robert Nichols was born on September 12, 1926, in New Albany, Indiana, to Silas and Alpha Nichols, who had four boys. He joined the US Navy in World War II and served as a firefighter on the USS Aaron Ward, which was bombed by the Japanese in May 1945 off Okinawa. He was wounded in the back and hip by shrapnel and awarded the Purple Heart. He burned his uniforms after the war.

Nichols married Laverne Korte in 1947. They had three sons and Nichols worked for General Electric as a draftsman. In 1964, Nichols left his wife and sons and filed for divorce the same year. He told Korte of his plans of leaving, for reasons she would find out "in due time." Nichols moved to Dearborn, Michigan, where he told his parents that he worked in the automobile industry, and relocated to Stroud, Oklahoma. In March 1965, he wrote to his parents that he had moved to Richmond, California, and he also sent a letter to his son Phil from Napa, California, the same month. His family never heard from him again and they reported him missing that year. When the family used detectives to attempt to find him in California and Indiana, they were unable to turn up anyone who knew him. Nichols worked using his real name until about 1976 according to the US Internal Revenue Service.

Nichols stole Chandler's identity in September 1978 in Rapid City, South Dakota. He then moved to Cleveland, where he briefly worked for the Edko Company, an engineering business. Nichols later worked as an electrical designer and draftsman for Lubrizol, a chemical company headquartered in Wickliffe, Ohio. The company laid him off in 1997. He had claimed to have a sister named Mary Wilson; however, the address he provided for her in Columbus, Ohio, was fictitious. It was eventually revealed that Nichols was actually born at the same address in New Albany.

Nichols was described as being a hermit who left his home only to go to work and eat. Co-workers have said he rarely talked to anyone and appeared to have few or no friends. In one instance at a Halloween gathering in 1992, he came to the event dressed as a gangster, yet talked to no one the entire night. He also took part in behavior perceived as eccentric and unusual, such as listening to white noise for hours, and once drove 700 miles (1,100 km) to an L.L. Bean store in Maine, only to promptly turn around and drive back to Ohio after discovering that there were no spots available in the store's parking lot. Acquaintances recalled that Nichols occasionally told them, "they are getting close," before leaving the area for days or weeks before returning. In 1989, he arrived at a local hospital with lacerations to his penis, claiming to have received them via a vacuum cleaner. He also had a knack for tinkering, and made homemade electronic devices. He had a computer that he occasionally used, which was accidentally broken by the first set of investigators who worked on the case. According to these investigators, searches related to Nazism and "plastic explosives" were found on his computer.

=== The real Joseph Chandler ===
Joseph Newton Chandler III was born on March 11, 1937, in Buffalo, New York, to Joseph Newton "Joe" Chandler Jr. and Ellie Christina Chandler.

On December 21, 1945, the Chandlers were travelling from Tulsa, Oklahoma to the home of Joe Chandler's mother in Weatherford, Texas for the Christmas holidays when their car collided head-on with a truck 2 miles (3.2 km) west of Sherman, Texas: eight-year-old Joseph III and his parents were killed instantly. The truck driver, L. C. Black, and the passenger in the truck, G. R. Hutchinson, both of De Queen, Arkansas, were not injured.

== Suicide ==
Robert Ivan Nichols's body was discovered in his apartment on July 30, 2002. He was believed to have killed himself about a week earlier; he had shot himself in the mouth with a .38-caliber Charter Arms revolver. On his calendar, he had marked down the days until his suicide. Before Nichols shot himself, he closed the blinds and turned off the air conditioning. He had been diagnosed with colon cancer, which may have influenced his decision to end his own life. He had $82,000 in his bank account and had listed his co-workers as emergency contacts.

His identity theft was revealed when authorities could not find any relatives and discovered that the real Chandler had died decades prior. Authorities were unable to find any usable fingerprints to assist in identification; they were able to get a DNA sample only after discovering he had visited a Lake County, Ohio, hospital for colon cancer surgery in 2000.

== Theories ==
Authorities had speculated that he was a fugitive of some kind, possibly on the run after committing one or more violent crimes. Ultimately, Nichols did not have an arrest warrant out for him at the time he fled, nor was he known to be fleeing outstanding debts, organized crime, terrorism, etc.

Some internet users suggested that Nichols, prior to his identification, might have been a fugitive, with theories claiming the possibility of him being D. B. Cooper or the Zodiac killer, as he did somewhat resemble police sketches of the Zodiac, and was known to have lived in California, where the Zodiac operated. The Zodiac operated mostly in the years 1968 (earliest known murders) to 1974 (Zodiac's last known communication to the media). One problem with this theory is that the Zodiac killer drew attention to himself and the crimes he committed, while Nichols did everything to avoid unwanted attention and exposure. Another problem is that authorities have DNA from both the Zodiac killer (though a partial one) and Nichols' DNA (full profile), and had they matched, authorities would have investigated further.

Authorities considered the possibility that he could have been a German soldier or Nazi official from the Second World War who had fled to the United States in an attempt to escape prosecution for alleged war crimes. Another theory was that he had been a fugitive named Steven Campbell, an engineer from Cheyenne, Wyoming, wanted for attempted murder. Investigators also followed a potential link to the unsolved 1989 murder of Amy Mihaljevic.

== Identification ==
In 2014, at the request of the local police, Peter J. Elliott, United States Marshal for the Northern District of Ohio, reopened the Chandler case. Based on DNA extracted from a tissue sample from a Lake County hospital, a CODIS profile was generated, but no hits were found. In 2016, Elliott asked forensic genealogist Colleen Fitzpatrick to compare Chandler's Y-STR profile obtained from a tissue sample to the public Y-STR genetic genealogy databases. A match indicated his possible surname as Nicholas or Nichols. In 2018, Fitzpatrick and Press's organization DNA Doe Project used autosomal SNP analysis, with bioinformatics analysis of the DNA results performed by Full Genomes Corporation, and the use of GEDmatch, a public personal genomics database, to find DNA matches, ultimately identifying Chandler as an engineering draftsman from New Albany, Indiana, named Robert Ivan Nichols. A CODIS match with Phil Nichols, Robert Nichols's son, confirmed the identification. Authorities were still open to receive information about Nichols's whereabouts during the 13-year timeframe, after leaving his family and before stealing the Chandler identity.

== See also ==
- List of solved missing person cases
- Lyle Stevik, a 2001 suicide in Washington. The man used this alias at the hotel in which he stayed. He then hanged himself in his room. He was identified on May 8, 2018. His identity has been withheld at the request of his family.
- Lori Erica Ruff, a 2010 suicide in Pennsylvania who was also discovered to have been living under of the identity of someone who died in childhood years before; she was identified as Kimberly Maria McLean in 2016.
- Peter Bergmann, the alias of a man who arrived in Sligo, Ireland, in 2009 and was found dead a few days later. His true identity remains unknown.
- Suzanne Sevakis, a woman who lived and died under the name Sharon Marshall, the stepdaughter of convicted murderer Franklin Delano Floyd, who passed her off as his wife.
- Ghosting
