= Isdal Woman =

Unexplained death in Norway, 1970

The Isdal Woman
- 2016 sketch by forensic artist Stephen Missal from morgue photographs
- Born: c. 1930–45; Unknown (most likely Southeast Germany near Nuremberg, Bavaria)
- Died: c. November 1970 (aged 25–40)
- Cause of death: Combination of carbon monoxide poisoning and barbiturate overdose
- Body discovered: 29 November 1970; Isdalen, Bergen, Norway
- Resting place: Møllendal cemetery, Bergen
- Other names: Geneviève Lancier; Claudia Tielt; Claudia Nielsen; Alexia Zarne-Merchez; Vera Jarle; Fenella Lorck; Elisabeth Leenhouwer
- Citizenship: Possibly Belgian
- Education: Possibly educated in France
- Occupations: Unknown; Claimed to be travelling saleswoman and antiquities dealer.; Postulated to be a spy or prostitute
- Known for: Mysterious death
- Height: 164 cm (5 ft 4 1/2 in)

The Isdal Woman (Norwegian: Isdalskvinnen, c. 1930–1945 – November 1970) is a placeholder name given to an unidentified woman who was found dead at Isdalen ("The Ice Valley") in Bergen, Norway, on 29 November 1970.

Although police at the time ruled a verdict of likely suicide, the nature of the case encouraged speculation and ongoing investigation in the years since. Half a century later, it remains one of the most profound cold case mysteries in Norwegian history.

== Discovery ==
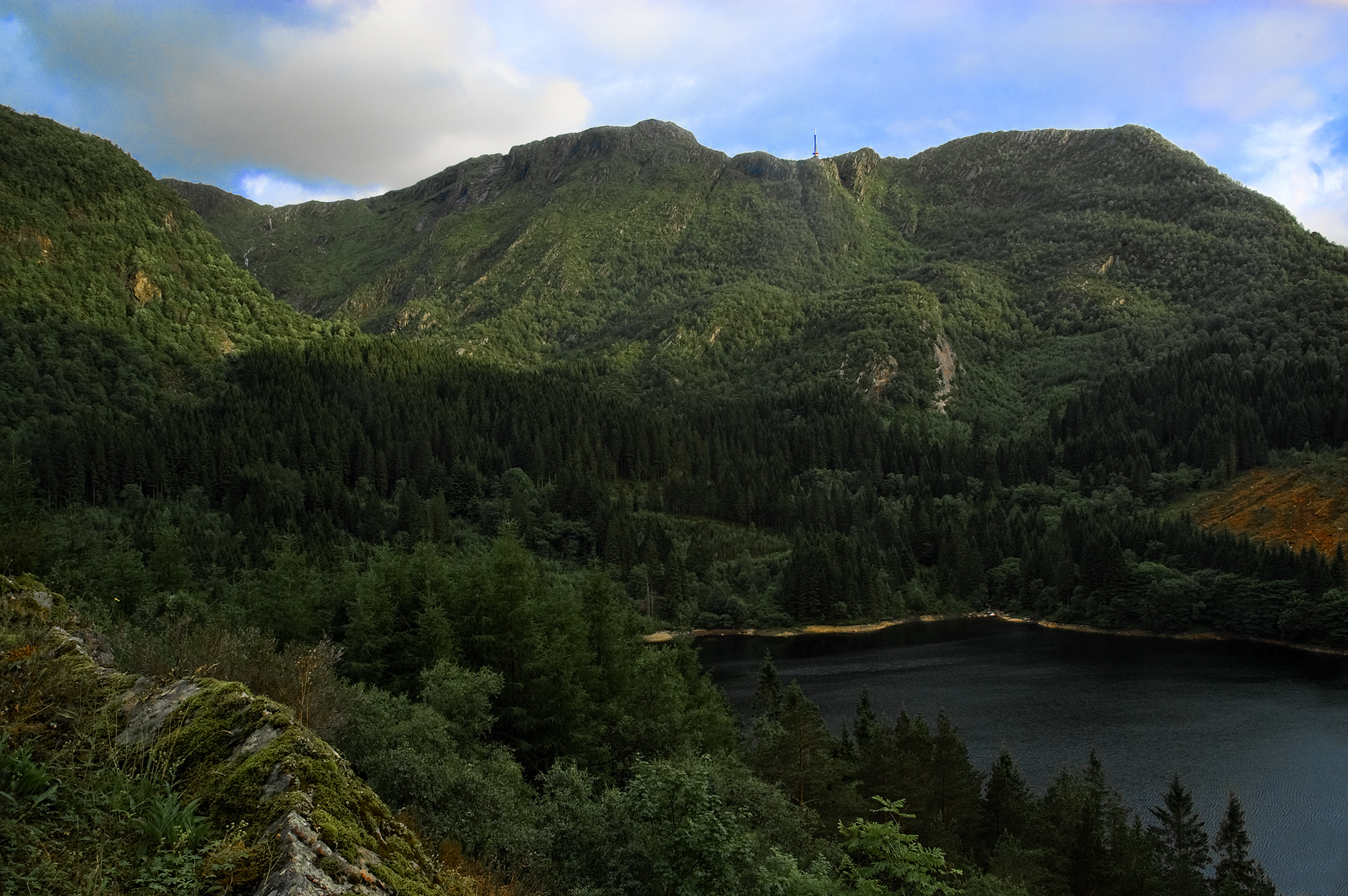
Isdalen, where the woman was discovered.

On the morning of 29 November 1970, a man and his two young daughters were hiking in the foothills of the north face of Ulriken, in an area known as Isdalen ("Ice Valley"); it was also nicknamed "Dødsdalen" ("Death Valley") due to the area's history of suicides in the Middle Ages and more recent hiking accidents. They came across the charred body of a woman located among some scree.

== Investigation ==
Bergen police responded quickly and launched a full-scale investigation, filed as case name "134/70". Examining the site, police noted the woman's supine position, her clenched hands up by her torso and the evidence of a nearby campfire. The front of her body and her clothes had been severely burned, and her face was unrecognisable. Also located or placed near the body, and affected by the fire, were an empty bottle of St. Hallvard liqueur; two plastic water bottles; a plastic passport holder; rubber boots, a woolen jumper and a scarf; nylon stockings; an umbrella, purse, and a matchbox. There was also a watch, two earrings and a ring. Around the body were traces of burned paper, and beneath it was a fur hat which was later found to have traces of petrol. All identifying marks and labels on these items had been removed or rubbed off.

Three days later, investigators found two suitcases belonging to the woman which had been abandoned at Bergen railway station. In the lining of one suitcase, police discovered five 100 Deutsche Mark notes (c. US$137 in 1970). Among other items, they also found clothing, shoes, wigs, makeup, eczema cream, 135 Norwegian kroner, Belgian, British and Swiss coins, maps, timetables, a pair of non-prescription glasses, sunglasses with partial fingerprints that matched to the woman, cosmetics and a notepad. All identification information had been removed from the items.

An autopsy at the Gades Institutt concluded the woman had died from a combination of incapacitation by phenobarbital and poisoning by carbon monoxide. Soot was found in her lungs, indicating she was alive as she burned, and her neck was bruised, possibly from a fall or blow. Analysis of the woman's blood and stomach showed that she had consumed between 50 and 70 Fenemal brand sleeping pills, and found next to her body were a further twelve sleeping pills. At autopsy, her teeth and jaw were removed due to her unique dental work, and tissue samples of her organs were taken.

Police then launched an appeal for information in the Norwegian media regarding the case. The last time she was seen alive had been on 23 November, when she checked out of Room 407 of the Hotel Hordaheimen. Hotel staff told police that she was good-looking and roughly 1.63 m (5 ft 4 in) tall, with dark brown hair and small brown eyes. Staff noted that the woman kept mainly to her room and seemed to be on guard. When she checked out, she paid her bill in cash and requested a taxi. Her movements between then and the discovery of her body remain unknown.

Police were able to decode the notepad entries, and determined that they indicated dates and places the woman had visited. As a result, based on handwritten check-in forms, police determined that the woman had travelled around Norway (i.e., Oslo, Trondheim, Stavanger) and Europe (Paris) with at least eight fake passports and aliases. While details such as birthdays and occupations changed from one form to another, she consistently gave her nationality as Belgian; the forms were filled out in either German or French.

These were her false identities:

- Geneviève Lancier, place of birth Leuven, living at Rue Sainte-Walburge 2, Leuven
- Claudia Tielt, place of birth Brussels, living at Place Saint-Walburge 17, Brussels
- Claudia Tielt, place of birth Brussels, living at Rue de la Madeleine 3, Brussels
- Claudia Nielsen, place of birth Ghent, living at Rue Sainte-Walburge 18, Brussels
- Alexia Zarne-Merchez, place of birth Ljubljana, living at Rue St. Hildegaarde 81, Brussels
- Vera Jarle, place of birth Antwerp (the form with address in Brussels has been lost)
- Fenella Lorck (the form with an address in Brussels has been lost)
- Elisabeth Leenhouwer, birthplace Ostend, living at Philipstockstraat 44A, Brussels.

With the exception of Rue de la Madeleine, all street names also turned out to be false.

It was also learned that the woman previously stayed at several hotels in Bergen, and was known to change rooms after checking in. She often told hotel staff that she was a travelling saleswoman and antiquities dealer. One witness said that she overheard the woman talking to a man in German in a Bergen hotel. Others who met her mentioned that she also spoke Flemish or broken English and smelled of garlic. People who saw or met her also commented that she wore wigs.

Composite sketches of the unknown woman, based on witness descriptions and analysis of her body, were circulated in many countries via Interpol. Despite the significant police resources deployed, the woman was never identified and the case was quickly closed. While authorities concluded that she had committed suicide by ingestion of sleeping pills, others believe that there is evidence that she was murdered.

== Burial ==
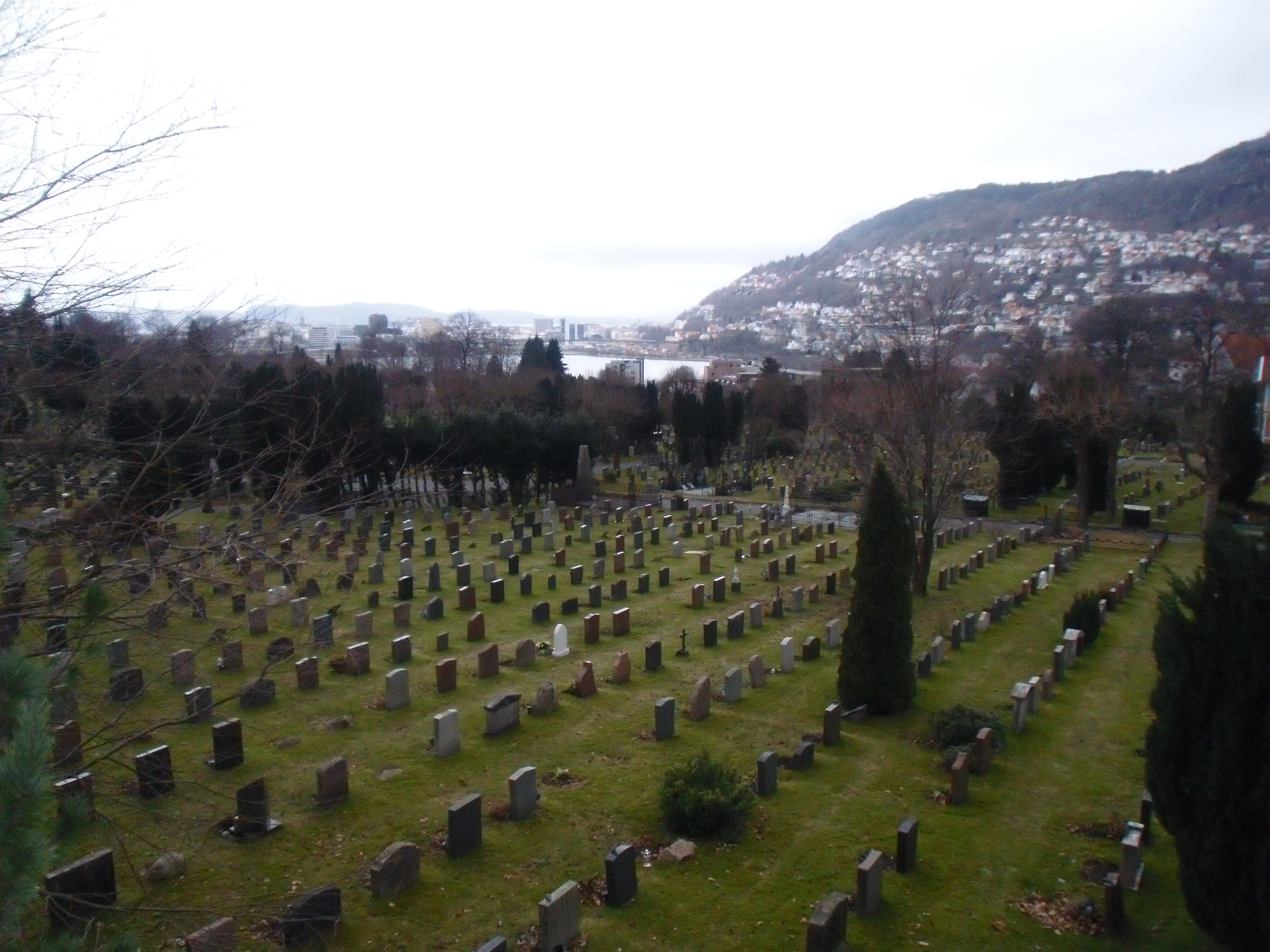
Møllendal cemetery, where "The Isdal Woman" is buried.

On 5 February 1971, the woman was given a Catholic burial (based on her use of saints' names on check-in forms) in an unmarked grave within the Møllendal graveyard located in Bergen. Attended by sixteen members of the Bergen police force, she was buried in a zinc coffin to preserve her remains and for ease of disinterment. Her ceremony was also photographed in case relatives came forward at a later date.

== Theories ==
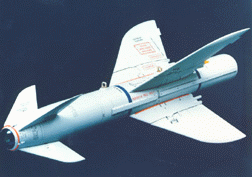
Norwegian Penguin missile.

Much remains unanswered about the case, especially the reasons for the woman's many identities and unexplained travel plans, which raise the question of espionage or criminal activity. Multiple investigations point to the possibility that she was a spy, given the Cold War context of the period. Norway had experienced other strange disappearances in the 1960s, close to military installations, which traced back to international espionage. The declassified records of the Norwegian Armed Forces also reveal that many of the woman's movements seem to correspond to top secret trials of the Penguin missile. A fisherman is also reported to have seen the woman in the area of Penguin missile testing in Stavanger; her presence in Stavanger is corroborated by a shoe salesman who sold her a pair of rubber boots.

== Later developments ==
The taxi driver who took the woman from the hotel to Bergen railway station was never found. In 1991, however, a taxi driver wishing to remain anonymous said that after picking up the unknown woman at the hotel, they were joined by another man for the ride to the railway station.

In 2005, a Bergen resident, who was aged 26 in 1970, told a local newspaper that after seeing the sketch circulated, he had suspected that the Isdal Woman was a woman he had seen five days before the body was discovered, when he was hiking on the hillside at Fløyen. Surprisingly, she was dressed lightly for the city rather than a hike, and was walking ahead of two men wearing coats who looked "southern". The woman appeared resigned and seemed about to say something to him but did not. He went to someone he knew at the police to report this incident, but was told to forget about it. Therefore, neither the man's name nor his alleged sighting was recorded at that time.

After the case was reopened in 2016, Norwegian broadcaster NRK commissioned the American artist Stephen Missal to create six alternative sketches of the Isdal Woman, which were shown to people who had seen her.

In 2017, stable isotope analysis of the woman's teeth (taken from her unburied jawbone) indicated that the woman had been born in about 1930, plus or minus four years, in or near Nuremberg, Germany, but had moved to France or the France–Germany border as a child. This reinforced earlier analysis of the woman's handwriting, which suggested that she had been educated in France or a neighbouring country. Analysis also indicated she had been to a dentist in either East Asia, Central Europe, Southern Europe or South America.

In 2018, NRK and the BBC World Service published a podcast series titled Death in Ice Valley, which included interviews with eyewitnesses and forensic scientists, also suggesting that the Isdal Woman's birthplace may have been southern Germany or the French-German border region, and that she was probably born in or around 1930. She was also probably raised in French-speaking Belgium. In June 2019, the BBC revealed that listeners of the podcast had given more clues. Further, Colleen Fitzpatrick, a geneticist with the DNA Doe Project, contacted the Death in Ice Valley team to offer her help in identifying the woman through genetic genealogical testing of autopsied tissues. In June 2021, a twelfth episode examined two women proposed by listeners as possible identities: Anna Hogerova, an international fraudster who disappeared in 1969, and Angelina Szelest, a wartime forced labourer later involved in espionage circles in Rome; the episode did not resolve the case.It has since been revealed that she is of mtDNA haplogroup H24, indicating a matrilineal line of descent originating in South East Europe or South West Asia. The woman also seems to have had a French passport based on the fact that an unidentified French national was registered on one of the flights she took to Norway.

Author Dennis Zacher Aske proposed that the Isdal Woman was a sex worker, based on the way that her route was planned (goal-oriented and always returning to the same point, probably her home), her wish to remain anonymous, her behaviour at hotels (including marking the doors in different ways) and the fact that the different men she was witnessed meeting never came forward. Aske argued that another person was probably at the crime scene when the woman died, based on evidence from the scene and her medically intoxicated condition in the hours before her death. He noted there were arguments that supported the death being either murder or assisted suicide, believing murder to be most likely.

In 2019, after a publication of an article in the French newspaper Le Républicain Lorrain, a resident of Forbach claimed to have had a relationship with the Isdal Woman in the summer of 1970. According to this informant, the woman was a polyglot with a Balkan accent who often dressed herself up to look younger than her age (between 36 and 44), refused to share personal details and often received scheduled phone calls from abroad. Looking through the woman's belongings, the informant found various wigs, colorful clothes and a photograph of the woman riding a horse. Suspecting she was a spy, he considered contacting the authorities but was afraid to do so. Both the informant's story and the photograph were published in a subsequent issue of the newspaper.

On June 12, 2023, an article in Neue Zürcher Zeitung suggested that the Isdal Woman may have had connections with the Swiss banker François Genoud, and that Norwegian Intelligence Service (E-tjenesten) interfered with local police investigations. The newspaper sourced the suggestion to a "professional fact-checker".

== See also ==
- Somerton Man
- Jennifer Fairgate case
- Peter Bergmann case
- David Lytton
- Lyle Stevik
- List of unsolved deaths
- Operation Identify Me
