= Murder of Gordon Sanderson =

Formerly unidentified murder victim in Canada

Gordon Sanderson
- Undated image of Sanderson
- Born: Gordon Edwin Sanderson; October 22, 1950; Manitoba, Canada
- Died: Early 1977 (aged 26); Alberta, Canada
- Cause of death: Homicide by gunshot
- Body discovered: April 13, 1977
- Other names: "Septic Tank Sam," "Sam Doe," "Tofield John Doe"
- Children: 1 daughter

Gordon "Gordie" Edwin Sanderson, previously known as Septic Tank Sam, Sam Doe and Tofield John Doe, was a formerly unidentified Canadian murder victim who was found in a septic tank in 1977 at Lindbrook, Alberta, thirteen kilometres (8.1 mi) west of Tofield. His remains were identified in January 2021, and his identity was revealed five months later. The investigation into his homicide is ongoing.

== Early life ==
Gordon Edwin Sanderson was an Indigenous man born in Manitoba on October 22, 1950. Police stated that Sanderson was a victim of the Sixties Scoop and put into foster care when he was nine years old. He struggled with addictions and had various run-ins with police.

In the 1970s, he was living in Edmonton, and had planned to visit his brother, Arthur, in Calgary.

== Discovery ==
Sanderson was found wearing a blue Levi's shirt with snap buttons, a grey T-shirt, blue jeans, and imitation Wallabee shoes. His decomposed body was wrapped in a yellow bed sheet and tied up with a nylon rope. Sanderson was found by a local couple scavenging their abandoned property for a septic tank pump. After seeing his leg bobbing in their old septic tank, they alerted the Tofield detachment of the Royal Canadian Mounted Police (RCMP). Two officers came to the scene to recover Sanderson's body, where they spent an hour emptying the 1.8-metre-deep (5.9 ft) septic tank with an empty ice cream pail.

=== Autopsy ===
A medical examiner in Edmonton determined Sanderson to be Caucasian. His bones and teeth suggested he had suffered from an unspecified illness at five years old. Sanderson's cause of death was two gunshots to the head and chest, although it was possible there could have been more if any of the bullets had not reached his skeleton. Before his death, Sanderson had been tortured: he had been beaten, tied up, burned with a small butane torch and cigarettes, and sexually mutilated with a sharp object. The sexual mutilation was so severe that the medical examiner took several months to positively identify him as a male. Based on the burn marks on his shirt sleeves, Sanderson could have been tied to a bed while tortured. The weapon(s) used to mutilate Sanderson could not be conclusively determined due to the condition of the remains, although the medical examiner suspected the use of farm shears. After Sanderson's death, he had been covered in quicklime, most likely in a mistaken attempt to hasten decomposition.

== Investigation ==
Facial reconstruction of the then-unidentified victim created in 1979 by Betty Pat Gatliff

Authorities suspected he was not from Alberta, but most likely worked as a migrant worker. Due to a lack of evidence in the septic tank, Sanderson was most likely murdered elsewhere and the septic tank was only a dumpsite. Sanderson's murderers are believed to have known him, due to how viciously he had been killed. It is also suspected Sanderson's murderers were Tofield locals or were familiar with the area, due to the location of Sanderson's dumpsite being on a rural property.

Sanderson's body has been exhumed from his unmarked grave in an Edmonton cemetery twice. In 1979, Sanderson's remains were flown out to Clyde Snow and Betty Pat Gatliff, forensic anthropologist and medical illustrator at the Federal Aviation Administration in Oklahoma who had been creating 3D facial composites from skulls since 1967. Along with creating a facial composite for Sanderson, the two could tell by measuring his hands that he was right-handed. Snow believed Sanderson to be Indigenous and around 35 years old, contradicting the RCMP's assumption of Sanderson being Caucasian and between 26 and 32.

Sanderson was exhumed and reconstructed for the second time in 2000 by Cyril Chan, who was with the Edmonton medical examiner's office at the time.

=== Aftermath ===
The 1,200 residents of Tofield at the time were horrified to hear of Sanderson's murder. Farmers checked their own septic tanks for bodies and business owners worried that Sanderson's murderers could have been regular customers. Many speculated Sam had been sexually mutilated due to committing a sex crime or being unfaithful in a relationship. Ed Lammerts, one of the officers who helped recover Sanderson's body, has since retired. He thought Sanderson would never be identified, despite sending X-rays of Sanderson's teeth to 800 Albertan dentists coupled with publishing them in dental magazines, and spending $1,000,000 on the case.

=== Current investigation ===
Police believe Sanderson was killed by associates of his involved in various criminal acts in Edmonton. They acknowledge that his killer may now be dead.

== Identification ==
On June 29, 2021, it was reported that the remains had been identified via genetic genealogy, 44 years after his discovery. Police had submitted DNA to Othram, Inc., a private laboratory in The Woodlands, Texas, and identified Sanderson in January 2021, after which the case became an active homicide investigation. On June 30, Alberta RCMP publicly identified Sam in a virtual press conference as Gordon Edwin Sanderson, a 26-year-old Indigenous man from Manitoba who was living in Edmonton at the time of his death. The last time Sanderson had spoken to his family, he had mentioned that he was going to visit his brother in Calgary. Sanderson's older sister's DNA was used to confirm his identity.

== See also ==
- List of solved missing person cases: 1950–1999
- List of unsolved murders (1900–1979)
- Lyle Stevik
- Murder of Shirley Soosay
- Murder of Susan Poupart
