= Lori Erica Ruff =

American identity thief (1968–2010)

- Ruff's driver's license photo from 2001
- Born: Kimberly Maria McLean; October 16, 1968; Philadelphia, Pennsylvania, U.S.
- Disappeared: Late October, 1986; King of Prussia, Pennsylvania, U.S.
- Died: December 24, 2010 (aged 42); Longview, Texas, U.S.
- Cause of death: Suicide by gunshot
- Other names: Lori Erica Kennedy, Becky Sue Turner
- Known for: Formerly unidentified identity thief
- Spouse: Blake Ruff (m. 2004; div. 2010)
- Children: 1

Lori Erica Kennedy Ruff (born Kimberly Maria McLean, October 16, 1968 – December 24, 2010) was an American identity thief who died by suicide in the driveway of her former in-laws' home in Longview, Texas on December 24, 2010. Following Ruff's death, her ex-husband and in-laws discovered through documents found in a lock box in her closet that she had been living under a false name when she married into the family. Coupled with her secretive behavior, which had contributed to the collapse of her marriage, Ruff's true identity remained unknown for nearly six years after her death.

A 2013 Seattle Times feature article about the case was published in news outlets around the world and created enormous interest in the online "websleuth" community. Ruff's true origins remained a mystery until September 2016, when her identity was confirmed using a combination of public records and direct-to-consumer autosomal SNP analysis of her husband's and daughter's DNA, leading back to the McLean–Cassidy family on the Philadelphia Main Line.

== Activities before marriage ==
=== Early life ===
Ruff was born as Kimberly Maria McLean in Philadelphia, Pennsylvania to James and Deanne McLean (née Cassidy). She grew up in the Philadelphia metropolitan area until her parents divorced. McLean's mother gained custody of McLean and her sister, married her second husband Robert Becker, and moved the family to Wyncote, where McLean attended Bishop McDevitt High School. She reportedly had a difficult time adjusting to the new environment, and did not get along with her mother and stepfather. In the fall of 1986, just after reaching age of majority with her 18th birthday, McLean abruptly moved away from home to the nearby town of King of Prussia, cutting off contact with her family shortly thereafter.

=== Identity theft ===
On May 20, 1988, McLean obtained the birth certificate of Becky Sue Turner, a two-year-old girl who had died, along with two of her siblings, in a house fire in Fife, Washington in 1971. McLean requested the birth certificate in Bakersfield, California, Becky Sue Turner's birthplace. She then traveled to Idaho, where she used the document to obtain a state ID card on June 16.

McLean, posing as Becky Sue Turner, appeared before a judge in Dallas on July 5, 1988, and legally changed her name to Lori Erica Kennedy. A week later, she obtained a Social Security number, removing traces of her true identity. She retained Becky Sue Turner's birth date of July 18, 1969. She received a Texas driver's license in 1989 and qualified for a GED the following year. She enrolled in Dallas County Community College, and in 1997 she graduated from the University of Texas at Arlington with a degree in business administration. McLean was recorded as residing in California, Idaho, and Las Vegas for "at least some time" under the Kennedy alias before moving to Bedford, Texas by 2001.

== Marriage ==
In 2003, while residing in Carrollton, Texas, McLean met Jon Blakely "Blake" Ruff, the son of a socially prominent family in East Texas, in a Bible study class. Ruff described her as being incredibly secretive, particularly regarding her past. She had told him she was from Arizona, that both her parents were dead, that she had had an unhappy childhood, and that she had no siblings; she also said her father had been a failed stockbroker. The couple eloped in January 2004 after Nancy Ruff, Blake's mother, inquired about placing a wedding announcement in the local newspaper. The only person in attendance at their wedding ceremony, held in a church outside Dallas, was the officiating preacher.

After getting married, the Ruffs moved to Leonard, Texas. They tried several times to have a child, but she had trouble conceiving and suffered multiple miscarriages. This led investigators to believe that Ruff was older than she claimed, although the difference turned out to be less than a year. She eventually gave birth to a baby girl via in vitro fertilisation in 2008.

== Divorce and suicide ==
=== Marriage breakdown ===
Ruff was "extremely protective" of her daughter, often refusing to let anyone else hold her and even taking the baby with her to use the bathroom. She would also obsessively track the Ruffs' family history and try to find out their family recipes, but she still refused to talk about her own past.

Eventually, Ruff did not want her in-laws to have any contact with her daughter; as a result, the Ruffs began encouraging Blake to get out of the marriage. After some failed marriage therapy sessions, Blake Ruff moved back to his parents' house in Longview and filed for divorce, leaving Lori with their daughter in Leonard.

=== Suicide ===
In the months between the separation and Lori's suicide, she behaved very erratically. A neighbor recalled that she and her daughter appeared to be undernourished and that Lori would often ramble incoherently to herself while pacing back and forth outside. She also began sending harassing emails to the Ruffs, created a scene at a custody exchange, and stole a set of house keys from them. The harassment was so severe that the Ruffs filed a cease and desist order just before Lori's death.

On December 24, 2010, Lori's body was discovered in her car in the Ruffs' driveway, dead from a self-inflicted gunshot wound. In the car were two suicide notes: One 11‑page note addressed to "my wonderful husband" and another addressed to her daughter, to be opened on her 18th birthday. The Ruffs opened and read the letter, but it contained only "ramblings from a clearly disturbed person" and no details about Lori's past. Authorities believe she initially traveled to the home with the intent of harming the family.

== Investigation ==
=== Discovery of past ===
After her funeral, some of the Ruffs drove to Lori’s house in Leonard to see if they could find any clues regarding her past. The house was discovered in disarray, with piles of dirty dishes, laundry, and stacks of trash, as well as shredded documents and papers with incoherent scribblings on them. They then discovered the lock box in a closet, pried it open with a screwdriver, and discovered the documentation of Ruff's past. Papers found in the lock box included the birth certificate of Becky Sue Turner, a judge's ruling granting a name change to Lori Erica Kennedy, and a paper with several seemingly random scribblings. A friend of the family of the real Becky Sue Turner verified that she had died in a house fire at the age of 2.

The writings on the paper found in the lock box included the scribblings "North Hollywood police," "402 months," and "Ben Perkins." The nature of these scribblings led some followers of the case to believe that Ruff was trying to avoid prison time, due to the references to police, a possible jail-term length, and the name of Ben Perkins, a Los Angeles attorney. When contacted, however, Perkins stated that he had never heard of Becky Sue Turner or Lori Kennedy. (Perkins, who was black and who marketed his legal services to LA's African-American community, had never taken on a white client during his career.) In addition, there were no matches for the woman in any existing fingerprint and facial recognition databases. The fact that Ruff was able to cover up her identity so well in a time before the Internet has led to speculation that she had enlisted the services of a so-called identity broker.

In September 2011, the Ruff family, with the help of a congressional aide, sought the help of Joe Velling, an investigator for the Social Security Administration (SSA) who specialised in solving identity theft cases. Velling agreed to help identify her as a case of identity theft. After following numerous leads, he was still unable to find any information about Lori from before 1986; being stumped, he sought the help of the general public to identify her through an article published June 22, 2013, in The Seattle Times. The article was subsequently republished in numerous newspapers around the world.

=== Identification ===
School portrait of McLean, circa 1984

Colleen Fitzpatrick, a former nuclear physicist and a pioneer in the field of forensic genealogy, learned of Lori Ruff in 2013 and began work on the case. Fitzpatrick had Ruff's husband and daughter tested by a direct-to-consumer testing company, through which Fitzpatrick was able to obtain Ruff's DNA results using genetic genealogy phasing techniques, which essentially subtracted Blake Ruff's DNA from their daughter's. Ruff had a first cousin named Cassidy on her list of matches; however, the name was very common and the cousin was not responsive. After two years, Fitzpatrick finally identified Ruff when she discovered a third-cousin match who was related to the Cassidys. Knowing the identity of the third cousin led her to Ruff's identity.

Fitzpatrick informed Joe Velling, who had in the meantime retired from the SSA. He flew to Pennsylvania to meet the potential family. Velling approached a relative, who immediately identified the deceased Lori Ruff as Kimberly McLean. McLean's mother took a DNA test which confirmed the match.

== See also ==
- List of solved missing person cases
- Lyle Stevik, a 2001 suicide in Washington. The man used this alias at the hotel in which he stayed. He then hanged himself in his room. He was identified on May 8, 2018. His identity has been withheld at the request of his family.
- Joseph Newton Chandler III, a 2002 suicide in Ohio who was also discovered to have been living under of the identity of someone who died in childhood years before; he was identified as Robert Nichols in 2018.
- Peter Bergmann, the alias of a man who arrived in Sligo, Ireland, in 2009 and was found dead a few days later. His true identity remains unknown.
- Suzanne Sevakis, a woman who lived and died under the name Sharon Marshall, the stepdaughter of convicted murderer Franklin Delano Floyd, who passed her off as his wife.
- Ghosting
