= Peter Bergman (disambiguation) =

Peter Bergman (born 1953) is an American actor.

Peter Bergman may also refer to:

- Peter Bergman (comedian) (1939–2012), founded The Firesign Theater, Ohio

== See also ==
- Peter Bergmann (1915–2002), physicist
- Peter Bergmann case, death of an unidentified person in Ireland
