= You Must Remember This (disambiguation) =

You Must Remember This is a 1987 novel by Joyce Carol Oates.

You Must Remember This may also refer to:

- You Must Remember This (podcast)
- "You Must Remember This" (As Time Goes By), a 1992 television episode
- "You Must Remember This" (House), a 2011 television episode
