= Death in Ice Valley =

Norwegian true crime podcast

- Genre: news commentary podcast

Cast and voices
- Hosted by: Marit Higraff and Neil McCarthy

Publication
- No. of seasons: 2
- No. of episodes: 12
- Original release: 26th March 2018 – 06th June 2021

Reception
- Ratings: 4.513513513513513/5

Related
- Website: http://www.bbc.co.uk/programmes/p060ms2h

Death in Ice Valley is a 2018 true crime podcast produced by NRK, the Norwegian radio and television public broadcasting company and BBC World Service. It is authored by Marit Higraff, a Norwegian investigative journalist with NRK, and Neil McCarthy, documentary producer with BBC. The podcast follows a two-year investigation into the Isdal Woman case, concerning an unknown woman whose burned body was found in western Norway in 1970. It instigated a crowd-sourcing campaign for new leads in the investigation, gathered around the eponymous Facebook group run by World Service editor Anna Doble and journalist Beth Ryder.

Higraff makes use of modern forms of journalism, mostly podcasting. She is one of the leading experts on the case of the Isdal Woman and successfully encouraged the Bergen Police to reopen the case in 2016.
