= Murder of Shirley Soosay =

Formerly unidentified decedent (1945–1980)

Shirley Soosay
- Photo of Soosay taken at an unknown date before her death
- Born: Shirley Ann Soosay; February 6, 1945; Maskwacis, Alberta, Canada
- Died: July 13, 1980 (aged 35); Delano, California, U.S.
- Cause of death: Homicide by stabbing
- Resting place: While unidentified: Bakersfield, California; After identification: Riverside Cemetery, Maskwacis, Alberta
- Relatives: Theresa Soosay (mother, died 1991), Violet Soosay-Wolf (niece)

Shirley Ann Soosay (February 6, 1945 – July 13, 1980) was an Indigenous Canadian murder victim who was formerly an unidentified decedent known as Kern County Jane Doe. A member of the Samson Cree Nation, Soosay grew up in Maskwacis, an unincorporated community in Alberta. For most of her adult life, Soosay lived in Edmonton and then later Vancouver, though she remained in regular contact with her family until 1979, when cards from her stopped coming. The last time she had been seen in person by her family, Soosay had given indication that she might visit Seattle, and so beginning in 1980, Shirley's niece Violet Soosay-Wolf began to search Seattle and British Columbia for Shirley.

On July 14, 1980, Soosay's body was found deep in an almond orchard in Delano, California. Soosay had been raped and stabbed 29 times before being dumped at the site. Local police investigation into the victim's identity included following leads from her autopsy and opening tip lines to the public, but local authorities were unable to make significant progress. In 2012, DNA analysis of another unidentified woman who was murdered in Ventura County, California several days after Soosay's murder showed the crimes to be committed by the same perpetrator. In 2018, though both victims remained unidentified, Wilson Chouest was convicted of both murders and sentenced to life in prison without parole.

In 2018, investigators from Kern County reached out to the DNA Doe Project for assistance in identifying their victim. In February 2020, DDP volunteers were unable to proceed genealogical investigation due to limited Indigenous DNA similar to Soosay's in the DNA database. The DDP made a Facebook post appealing for help, which was quickly seen by Violet Soosay-Wolf. Soosay-Wolf submitted her DNA for comparison, and in February 2020, Kern County Jane Doe was confirmed to be Shirley Soosay. Soosay's case is considered to be one of the earliest examples of unidentified Indigenous North American remains to be identified through investigative genetic genealogy.

== Background ==
Shirley Ann Soosay was born in 1945 to Theresa Soosay of the Maskwacis reserve of the Samson Cree Nation, south of Edmonton, in Alberta. Soosay was described by loved ones as joyful, curious, and free-spirited. As an adolescent, Soosay attended Ermineskin residential school. Soosay was especially close with a classmate of hers named Flora Northwest. Northwest has reported that both she and Soosay were abused at the institution. After their time at Ermineskin, both Soosay and Northwest returned to the reserve at age 16.

Though Northwest continued to live on the reserve, Soosay moved to Edmonton in her early 20s. In Edmonton, Soosay worked at a catering job. Later, Soosay moved to Vancouver, where she worked as a domestic worker. Soosay would regularly send some of her earnings home to her ailing mother, Theresa Soosay, as well as cards on birthdays and holidays. Soosay was the mother of two boys, both of whom were seized by the Child Welfare System, possibly after the father, with whom Soosay was reputed to have a bad relationship, called the authorities with unverified allegations of mistreatment. Loved ones of Soosay have described the seizure of her sons as having devastated Soosay.

After the removal of her sons, Soosay began to use drugs and alcohol. Following this, her infant daughter was also removed from her custody. By 1975, Soosay had developed a dependence on substances. Despite this, those close to her say that Soosay remained housed and continued to put care into her appearance.

== Disappearance ==
Soosay was last seen on her home reserve in 1977, when she attended the funeral of her oldest brother. Violet Soosay-Wolf, Shirley's niece, has recounted asking Soosay at the funeral if she was going to move back home again, to which Soosay responded that she was going to return to Vancouver and may visit a friend in Seattle. In 1979, family members in Maskwacis stopped receiving correspondence from Shirley.

Shirley's disappearance was greatly upsetting to Theresa Soosay, who Violet Soosay-Wolf says would lament every night. After Shirley's disappearance, Soosay-Wolf made a promise to Theresa that she would search for Shirley and "bring her home". In 1980, 20 year old Soosay-Wolf began making regular 13-hour drives to British Columbia and Seattle, where she would search morgues, hostels, hospitals, and cemeteries for Shirley. No searches were ever conducted in California, as Shirley had never given reason for loved ones to think she was there. In 2006, Soosay-Wolf tracked down both of Soosay's sons by submitting her DNA to Ancestry.com. One of the sons returned to live on the reserve. Soosay-Wolf continued to make searches for Soosay throughout her adulthood. Over the years, Soosay-Wolf's searches were aided by loved ones of Soosay, including Northwest, and Soosay's sister Belle, who assisted until her death in 2011. In 2019, Soosay-Wolf spoke at a Women's Conference about her exhaustive efforts to fulfill her promise to Theresa, who died in 1991, and how Soosay-Wolf needed to let go.

== Death and discovery ==
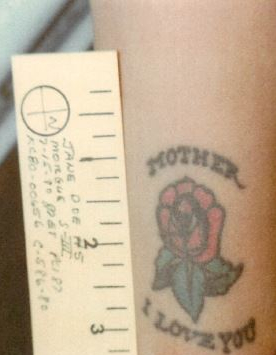
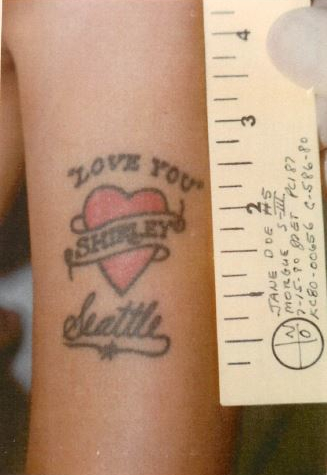
Autopsy photos of the tattoos found on Soosay

Soosay's body was found 14 July 1980 in an almond orchard outside of Delano, California, near Highway 99. Soosay's body was 13 rows deep in the orchard, a significant distance from the nearest road. Soosay's remains were found by an irrigation worker who worked at the orchard; she had been dead for approximately 1 day. The soil around Soosay's body had the imprints of tire tracks, but no footprints, suggesting that Soosay had been killed elsewhere and dumped at the scene. Soosay had been raped shortly before her death, and was stabbed 29 times in the chest and abdomen. Soosay also had defense wounds on her arms. Soosay was found clothed and was wearing a pink blouse, however, no personal property such as jewelry, a purse, or identification was found with her.

An autopsy suggested that the then-unidentified remains were that of a Hispanic or Indigenous woman, aged approximately 30 to 35 years old. The decedent likely stood 64 inches (160 cm) and weighed approximately 115 pounds (52 kg). A bottle of Michelob beer was recovered from the scene, and Soosay's blood alcohol content was 0.3%. When Soosay's body was recovered, an entire row of her top teeth were also missing. The autopsy also found evidence of prior pregnancy and birth, and a surgical rod in one of her legs. Soosay had two unique tattoos on her left arm, one of which read "MOTHER – I LOVE YOU" and the other which read ""LOVE YOU" – SHIRLEY – Seattle". After the body remained unidentified for a significant period of time, she was buried in an anonymous grave in a California cemetery.

== Investigation ==
While unidentified, Soosay came to be officially known as Kern County Jane Doe #5. Kern County investigators sent Soosay's fingerprints to Washington and Nevada, thinking she was possibly a migrant worker following seasonal harvests, and also because of the word "Seattle" being found on one of Soosay's tattoos. Another angle that was pursued was the origin of Soosay's tattoos, but neither could be traced back to a specific tattoo shop of origin. Additionally, tattoo artists in Los Angeles told inspectors that the design of the tattoos did not resemble prevailing local styles. The Kern County Sheriff Coroner Division had also repeatedly set up tip lines and media broadcasts, however no leads to the woman's identity were ever generated, leading inspectors to believe that she was not local in origin.

Due to information provided by her killer after his sentencing, investigators theorize that Soosay had been abducted from a pub named Ruby's in Lemoore, in neighboring Kings County, an establishment which has been replaced by another bar known today as The Wrecking Ball. Investigators also had a lead that suggested the victim had gone by the name "Rebecca Ochoa" or "Becky" during her life. Shirley's case was featured in a crime show years later, which Violet Soosay-Wolf distinctly remembers seeing. However, the program listed her as Becky Ochoa, causing Soosay-Wolf to discount the possibility. In July 2018, Dawn Ratliff, who headed the case, reached out to the DNA Doe Project (DDP) asking them to take on the case.

== Apprehension of the killer ==
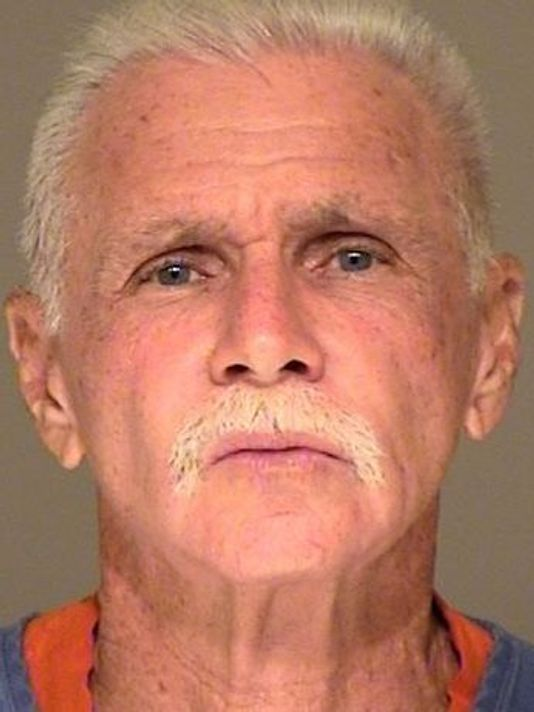
Mugshot of Chouest from his conviction of the murders of Soosay and the Ventura County victim

In 2008, a DNA test identified 56 year old Wilson Chouest as a suspect in the murder of the then-unidentified Soosay. At the time, Chouest was serving a life sentence in state prison for several counts of kidnapping, robbery, and rape that occurred in August and September 1980, and was eligible for parole in 2017. However, no charges were filed and the case was not brought to court, as Kern County did not want to prosecute the case without the identity of the victim. In 2012, DNA harvested from rape kits in 1980 linked Soosay's murder to the murder of another woman who had been found raped and stabbed in Westlake Village, in Ventura County, California on 18 July 1980. The Ventura County victim was identified as Maricela Rocha Parga on February 23, 2026. Following this development, Soosay's case was absorbed by the Ventura County investigators in 2013.

Because Chouest's DNA had been found on 2 victims in very similar murder cases, the case was taken to court even though neither victim had been identified. In September 2015, Chouest was relocated to Ventura County by court order. On 30 September 2015, Chouest was charged with 3 counts of murder and tried in Ventura County Superior Court. On 31 May 2018, Chouest was convicted of the rape and murder of the 2 women. Chouest was also tried for the murder of Rocha’s unborn son, but was found not guilty and sentenced to 2 life sentences without the possibility of parole.

== Identification ==
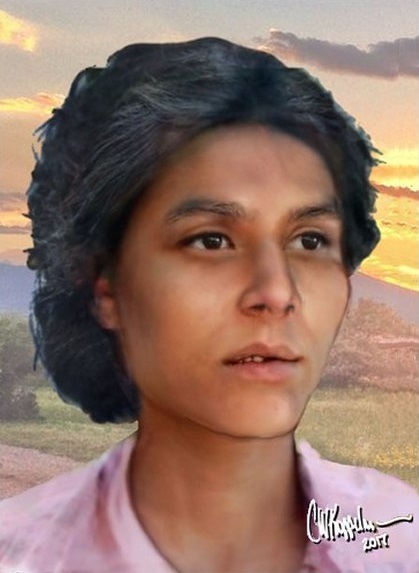
Facial reconstruction of Soosay by Carl Koppelman

In 2018, the DDP officially took on Kern County Jane Doe as a case. DNA for a DNA profile was extracted from the bloodstains on the blouse Soosay had been found in, which had been kept in evidence storage and would thus be less costly than an exhumation. In a news release, the DDP stated that the available DNA on the blouse was highly degraded, causing it to take nearly a year to fully reconstruct Soosay's genome. In May 2019, Soosay's genetic profile was uploaded to GEDmatch to begin genetic tracing. When Soosay's profile was initially uploaded, it had no matches with any profiles in the GEDmatch database.

In September 2019, an individual uploaded their DNA to GEDmatch and was noticed as a half-second cousin of Soosay, meaning that Soosay and this individual shared 1 great-grandparent. However, the DNA alone did not tell DDP volunteers which great-grandparent this was. Examining the individual's entire lineage, DDP volunteers were able to determine that the individual had 1 Indigenous great-grandparent, and the search proceeded in that direction. However, while tracing Soosay's lineage, the DDP encountered difficulties from a lack of relevant data and was eventually unable to continue. Gina Wrather, the DDP team leader for Soosay's case, has stated that Indigenous ancestry is particularly difficult to trace, due to a relative lack of Indigenous DNA being uploaded to databases such as GEDmatch, and also because Indigenous family history is often relayed orally, leaving little official documentation for forensic genealogists to work with. DDP volunteers had determined that Kern County Jane Doe's parents had likely both come from Maskwacis, (Note: Hobbema was renamed Maskwacis in 2014) and other branches of her family had been traced to parts of Saskatchewan and Manitoba. One of the distant matches involved, Trish Hurturbise of the Couchiching First Nation, was so compelled by the case that she underwent the DDP's training program and became one of the few DDP volunteers based in Canada.

In February 2020, the DDP made a Facebook post about the Kern County Jane Doe case, which included a facial reconstruction by Carl Koppelman and what the DDP had discovered so far about the woman's lineage, and asked Indigenous people of the area to help by uploading their DNA to GEDmatch for comparison. The post also included directions to where viewers could send their DNA to. In February 2020, days after the post was made, Violet Soosay-Wolf saw the post, and immediately suspected that Kern County Jane Doe could be Shirley Soosay. Soosay-Wolf had uploaded her DNA to Ancestry.com in the past, during her search for Soosay's repossessed children, but Ancestry.com does not allow law enforcement to view their database. Shortly after Soosay-Wolf submitted her DNA to GEDmatch, Kern County Jane Doe was officially confirmed in February 2020 to be Shirley Ann Soosay. Soosay's identification was announced to the public on 23 April 2021.

Shortly after her identification, family members of Soosay began working with the California cemetery and coroner's office to have Soosay's remains exhumed and transported home to Canada for reburial. However, complications of the COVID-19 pandemic delayed this action until May 2022. Before the exhumation, a small memorial service took place on 26 May 2022 at the California cemetery where Soosay had been interred anonymously. The memorial was attended largely by staff from the cemetery and the coroner's office, and also featured a traditional ceremony with smudging, songs, and blessings performed by the Tule River Tribe of California. Soosay's remains were flown from California to Edmonton International Airport on 27 May 2022. After a memorial service at a Wetaskiwin funeral home, Soosay's remains were transported to a cemetery in Maskwacis. A wake with traditional drumming ceremonies was held before Soosay's reburial. On 28 May 2022, Soosay was interred in her final resting place at Riverside Cemetery in Maskwacis.

== Impact of the case ==
In 2022, Soosay and Ventura County Jane Doe's case was aired in an episode of Cold Case Files. Following the broadcast, Soosay-Wolf received correspondence from Indigenous families from Canada and the United States, who also had missing relatives they hoped to find. Soosay's case is also to be included in a documentary which was still in the process of being filmed as of May 2022. In 2023, Soosay's case was featured in the Hulu webseries Web of Death. Trish Hurturbise, a distant match who was inspired by the case to become a volunteer for the DNA Doe Project, had worked on 150 cases as of 2021. The notoriety surrounding Soosay's case has been used to call attention to the Missing and Murdered Indigenous Women movement, especially in Canada.

== See also ==
- Missing and murdered Indigenous women
- List of solved missing person cases: 1950–1999
- Lyle Stevik
- Murder of Gordon Sanderson
- Murder of Susan Poupart
