= Army Club =

Discontinued British cigarette brand

- Product type: Cigarette
- Current owner: Cavanders Ltd
- Produced by: Cavanders Ltd
- Country: United Kingdom
- Introduced: 1775; 251 years ago
- Discontinued: 1961
- Markets: United Kingdom
- Previous owners: Godfrey Phillips

Army Club was a British brand of cigarettes, owned and manufactured by Cavanders Ltd of London.

== History ==
The brand was founded by Cavanders Ltd in 1775. Cavanders was a cigarette company originally based in Manchester, but eventually moved its operations in London.

Army Club was a popular cigarette brand in the 1910s, especially during World War I.

The brand was discontinued in 1961, as the company was taken over by the Godfrey Philips Company, whose main factory is now in Mumbai. It is believed that the company was eventually acquired by Philip Morris International.

An Army Club cigarette packet was found in the pocket of the Somerton Man.

In September 2014, Wales Online reported that a +100-year-old packet of Army Club cigarettes exists. The pack is kept by Brian Alexander, which has kept it safe since his father passed it onto him after his grandfather, known as Arthur Maddox, gave it to him. "The cigarettes were brought home from World War One by my grandfather Arthur Maddox, and he gave them to my father, Fred Alexandar. My grandfather bet my father he would smoke them before the month was out because he was a chain smoker. But my father did not smoke them, and so he passed them on to me and I still have them," Brian said.

An old Army Club advertising board

== Advertising ==
Various posters were made to promote the brand, especially during the time of World War I. The posters were made in multiple languages, such as English and French. Advertising campaigns for this brand adopted the themes of nostalgia of wartime camaraderie and male culture. Army Club cigarettes were also promoted in newspapers, such as The Illustrated London News, as well as on railway carriages. Signs promoting this brand were also made.

In the 1920s, these cigarettes were sold in elaborate tins made of pressed copper.

A set of landscape cards were also issued with every pack of Army Club cigarettes, along with a special camerascope to view the pictures with.

== See also ==
- Tobacco smoking
