= Stephen Missal =

American painter

Stephen Missal (born 1948) is an artist from Albuquerque, New Mexico, who specializes in figure drawing, painting, and fantasy themed art. Missal lives in Scottsdale, Arizona with his wife and their two children. He teaches at the Art Institute of Phoenix. Missal has co-authored books on illustration and character design with Kevin Hedgpeth, also from the Art Institute. His illustrations have appeared in Call of Cthulhu published by Wizards of the Coast and Scholastic Book's children's prehistoric creatures pop-up series.

In 2016, NRK commissioned the American artist Stephen Missal to create six alternative sketches of the "Isdal Woman", which were put before people who had seen her. Missal also works with the Maricopa County Forensic Lab and is a certified forensic artist.
