= You Must Remember This =

Novel by Joyce Carol Oates

- First edition
- Author: Joyce Carol Oates
- Language: English
- Published: 1987 (Dutton)
- Publication place: United States
- Media type: Print (hardback & paperback)
- ISBN: 0-525-24545-6
- OCLC: 14718963
- Dewey Decimal: 813/.54 19
- LC Class: PS3565.A8 Y6 1987

You Must Remember This is a 1987 novel by Joyce Carol Oates. It tells the story of Enid Maria, a girl who falls in love with her uncle, a professional boxer. It also is about her family, the Stevicks, and their thriving life in Port Oriskany, a fictional industrial city in upstate New York.

== Ties to other media ==
The book's title comes from the song "As Time Goes By" (1931), whose first lines are, "You must remember this / a kiss is just a kiss"; the tune was made famous when used as the theme song for Casablanca (1942).

An unidentified man who committed suicide by hanging in 2001, in a motel in Amanda Park, Washington, had used the name "Lyle Stevik" when checking in, as an alias. The man was seen alive prior to his death, including at the hotel where he died. In May 2018, it was announced that "Lyle" was identified after nearly 17 years, and that the discovery was made with assistance from a non-profit organization called the DNA Doe Project. The man was 25 years old when he died and had previously resided in California. His relatives requested for his identity to be withheld. His alias is a slight misspelling of Lyle Stevick, the protagonist's father in Oates' book.
