= Somerton Man =

Mysterious death in 1940s Australia

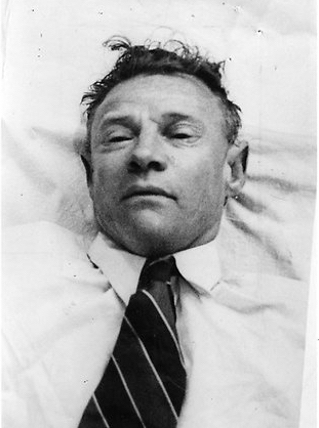
- Reconstructed photograph made by police of the man, 1948
- Born: Carl "Charles" Webb; 16 November 1905; Footscray, Victoria, Australia
- Died: 1 December 1948 (aged 43); Somerton, South Australia
- Cause of death: Homicide or suicide
- Burial place: West Terrace Cemetery, Adelaide, South Australia; Gravesite: P3, 12, 106
- Known for: Mysterious death and unknown identity

The Somerton Man is an unidentified man whose body was found on 1 December 1948 on the beach at Somerton Park, a suburb of Adelaide, South Australia. The case is also known by the Persian phrase tamám shud (تمام شد), (Note: Tamám was misspelt as Tamán in many early reports, and this error has often been repeated, leading to confusion about the name in the media. While the words that end The Rubaiyat are "Tamám Shud" (تمام شد), it has often been referred to as "Taman Shud" in the media, because of a spelling error in early newspaper coverage or police reports which has persisted. In Persian, "tamám" (تمام) is a noun that means "the end", with shud (شد) being an auxiliary verb indicating past tense, giving the translation of 'tamám shud' as "ended" or "finished".) meaning "It is over" or "It is finished", which was printed on a scrap of paper found months later in the fob pocket of the man's trousers. The scrap had been torn from the final page of a copy of Rubáiyát of Omar Khayyám, a poetry book.

Following a public appeal by police, the book from which the page had been torn was located. On the inside back cover, detectives could read indentations left from previous handwriting: a local telephone number, another unidentified number, and text that resembled a coded message. The text has not been deciphered or interpreted in a way that satisfies authorities on the case.

Since the early stages of the police investigation, the case has been considered "one of Australia's most profound mysteries". There has been intense speculation ever since regarding the identity of the victim, the cause of his death, and the events leading up to it. Public interest in the case remains significant for several reasons: the death occurred at a time of heightened international tensions following the beginning of the Cold War; the apparent involvement of a secret code; the possible use of an undetectable poison; and the inability or unwillingness of authorities to identify the dead man.

On 26 July 2022, University of Adelaide professor Derek Abbott, in association with genealogist Colleen M. Fitzpatrick, claimed the man was Carl "Charles" Webb, an electrical engineer and instrument maker born in 1905, based on genetic genealogy from DNA of the man's hair. South Australia Police and Forensic Science South Australia have not verified the result, although they were hopeful of being able to do so.

== Initial discovery and investigation ==
=== Discovery of body ===
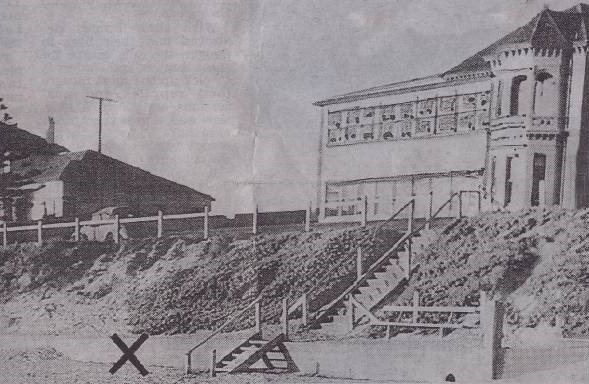
Location on Somerton Park beach where the corpse was found, marked by an 'X'

On 1 December 1948 at 6:30 am, the police were contacted after the body of a man was discovered by a couple on Somerton Park beach near Glenelg, about 11 km (7 mi) southwest of Adelaide, South Australia. The man was found lying in the sand across from the Crippled Children's Home, which was on the corner of The Esplanade and Bickford Terrace. He was lying back with his head resting against the seawall, with his legs extended and his feet crossed. It was believed the man had died while sleeping. A half smoked cigarette was on the right collar of his coat. A search of his pockets revealed an unused second-class rail ticket from Adelaide to Henley Beach; a bus ticket from the city that may not have been used; a narrow aluminium comb that had been manufactured in the US; a half-empty packet of Juicy Fruit chewing gum; an Army Club cigarette packet which contained seven cigarettes of a different brand, Kensitas; and a quarter-full box of Bryant & May matches.

Witnesses who came forward said that on the evening of 30 November they had seen an individual resembling the dead man lying on his back in the same spot where the corpse was later found. A couple who saw him at around 7 pm noted that they saw him extend his right arm to its fullest extent and then drop it limply. Another couple who saw him from 7:30 pm to 8 pm, during which time the street lights had come on, recounted that they did not see him move during the half an hour in which he was in view, although they did have the impression that his position had changed. Although they commented between themselves that it was odd that he was not reacting to the mosquitoes, they had thought it most likely that he was drunk or asleep, and thus did not investigate further. One of the witnesses told the police she observed a man looking down at the sleeping man from the top of the steps that led to the beach. Witnesses said the body was in the same position when the police viewed it.

Another witness came forward in 1959 and reported to the police that he and three others had seen a well-dressed man carrying another man on his shoulders along Somerton Park beach the night before the body was found. A police report was made by Detective Don O'Doherty.

According to the pathologist, John Burton Cleland, the man was of "Britisher" appearance and thought to be aged about 40–45; he was in "top physical condition". He was: 180 centimetres (5 ft 11 in) tall, with grey eyes, fair to ginger-coloured hair, slightly grey around the temples, with broad shoulders and a narrow waist, hands and nails that showed no signs of manual labour, big and little toes that met in a wedge shape, like those of a dancer or someone who wore boots with pointed toes; and pronounced high calf muscles consistent with people who regularly wore boots or shoes with high heels or performed ballet.

He was dressed in a white shirt; a red, white and blue tie; brown trousers; socks and shoes; a brown knitted pullover and fashionable grey and brown double-breasted jacket of reportedly "American" tailoring. All labels on his clothes had been removed, and he had no hat (unusual for 1948) or wallet. He was clean-shaven and carried no identification, which led police to believe he had committed suicide. Finally, his dental records could not be matched to any known person.

An autopsy was conducted, and the pathologist estimated the time of death at around 2 am on 1 December.

The heart was of normal size, and normal in every way...small vessels not commonly observed in the brain were easily discernible with congestion. There was congestion of the pharynx, and the gullet was covered with whitening of superficial layers of the mucosa with a patch of ulceration in the middle of it. The stomach was deeply congested... There was congestion in the second half of the duodenum. There was blood mixed with the food in the stomach. Both kidneys were congested, and the liver contained a great excess of blood in its vessels. ...The spleen was strikingly large ... about 3 times normal size ... there was destruction of the centre of the liver lobules revealed under the microscope. ... acute gastritis hemorrhage, extensive congestion of the liver and spleen, and the congestion to the brain.

The autopsy also showed that the man's last meal was a pasty eaten about three to four hours before death, but tests failed to reveal any foreign substance in the body. The pathologist, John Dwyer, concluded: "I am quite convinced the death could not have been natural ... the poison I suggested was a barbiturate or a soluble hypnotic". Although poisoning remained a prime suspicion, the pasty was not believed to be the source. Other than that, the coroner was unable to reach a conclusion as to the man's identity, cause of death, or whether the man seen alive at Somerton Beach on the evening of 30 November was the same man, as nobody had seen his face at that time. The body was then embalmed on 10 December 1948, after the police were unable to get a positive identification. The police said this was the first time they knew that such action was needed.

=== Discovery of suitcase ===
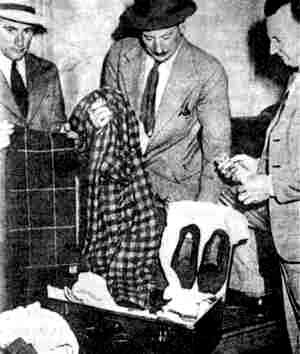
Suitcase and effects, found at Adelaide railway station. From left to right are detectives Dave Bartlett, Lionel Leane, and Len Brown.

On 14 January 1949, staff at the Adelaide railway station discovered a brown suitcase with its label removed, which had been checked into the station cloakroom after 11:00 am on 30 November 1948. It was believed that the suitcase was owned by the man found on the beach. In the case were a red checked dressing gown, a size-seven red felt pair of slippers, four pairs of underpants, pyjamas, shaving items, a light brown pair of trousers with sand in the cuffs, an electrician's screwdriver, a table knife cut down into a short sharp instrument, a pair of scissors with sharpened points, a small square of zinc thought to have been used as a protective sheath for the knife and scissors, and a stencilling brush, as used by third officers on merchant ships for stencilling cargo.

Also in the suitcase was a thread card of Barbour brand orange waxed thread of "an unusual type" not available in Australia – it was the same as that used to repair the lining in a pocket of the trousers the dead man was wearing. All identification marks on the clothes had been removed but police found the name "T. Keane" on a tie, "Keane" on a laundry bag and "Kean" on a singlet, along with three dry-cleaning marks; 1171/7, 4393/7 and 3053/7. Police believed that whoever removed the clothing tags either overlooked these three items or purposely left the "Keane" tags on the clothes, knowing Keane was not the dead man's name. With wartime rationing still enforced, clothing was difficult to acquire at that time. Although it was a very common practice to use name tags, it was also common when buying secondhand clothing to remove the tags of the previous owners. What was unusual was that there were no spare socks found in the case, and no correspondence, although the police found pencils and unused letter stationery.

A search concluded that no T. Keane was missing in any English-speaking country. A nationwide circulation of the dry-cleaning marks also proved fruitless. All that could be garnered from the suitcase was that the front gusset and featherstitching on a coat found in the case indicated it had been manufactured in the United States. The coat had not been imported, indicating the man had been to America or bought it from someone of similar size who had been.

Police checked incoming train records and believed the man had arrived at the Adelaide railway station by overnight train from either Melbourne, Sydney, or Port Augusta. They speculated he had showered and shaved at the adjacent City Baths (although there was no Baths ticket on his body) before returning to the railway station to purchase a ticket for the 10:50 am train to Henley Beach, which, for whatever reason, he did not board. He immediately checked his suitcase at the station cloak room before leaving the station and catching a city bus to Glenelg. Although named "City Baths", the centre was not a public bathing facility, but rather a public swimming pool. The railway station bathing facilities were adjacent to the station cloak room, which itself was adjacent to the station's southern exit onto North Terrace. The City Baths on King William St. were accessed from the station's northern exit via a lane way. There is no record of the station's bathroom facilities being unavailable on the day he arrived.

=== Inquest ===
An inquest into the man's death, conducted by coroner Thomas Erskine Cleland, commenced a few days following the discovery of the body but was adjourned until 17 June 1949. Cleland, as the investigating pathologist, re-examined the body and made a number of discoveries. He noted that the man's shoes were remarkably clean and appeared to have been recently polished, rather than in the condition expected of a man who had apparently been wandering around Glenelg all day. He added that this evidence fitted in with the theory that the body may have been taken to Somerton Park beach after the man's death, accounting for the lack of evidence of vomiting and convulsions, which are the two main physiological reactions to poison.

Cleland speculated that, as none of the witnesses could positively identify the man they saw the previous night as the same person discovered the next morning, there remained the possibility the man had died elsewhere and had been dumped. He stressed that this was purely speculation as all the witnesses believed it was, "definitely the same person", as the body was in the same place and lying in the same distinctive position. He also found no evidence indicating the identity of the deceased.

Cedric Stanton Hicks, professor of physiology and pharmacology at the University of Adelaide, testified that of a group of drugs, variants of a drug in that group he called "number 1" and in particular "number 2" were extremely toxic in a relatively small oral dose that would be extremely difficult if not impossible to identify even if it had been suspected in the first instance. He gave Cleland a piece of paper with the names of the two drugs which was entered as Exhibit C.18. The names were not released to the public until the 1980s as at the time they were "quite easily procurable by the ordinary individual" from a chemist without the need to give a reason for the purchase. (The drugs were later publicly identified as digitalis and ouabain, both cardenolide-type cardiac glycosides.) Hicks noted the only "fact" not found in relation to the body was evidence of vomiting. He then stated its absence was not unknown but that he could not make a "frank conclusion" without it. Hicks stated that if death had occurred seven hours after the man was last seen to move, it would imply a massive dose that could still have been undetectable. It was noted that the movement seen by witnesses at 7 pm could have been the last convulsion preceding death.

Early in the inquiry, Cleland stated, "I would be prepared to find that he died from poison, that the poison was probably a glucoside and that it was not accidentally administered; but I cannot say whether it was administered by the deceased himself or by some other person." Despite these findings, he could not determine the cause of death of the unidentified man. Cleland remarked that if the body had been carried to its final resting place then "all the difficulties would disappear".

After the inquest, a plaster cast was made of the man's head and shoulders. The lack of success in determining the identity and cause of death of the man had led authorities to call it an "unparalleled mystery" and believe that the cause of death might never be known.

=== Connection to Rubaiyat of Omar Khayyam ===
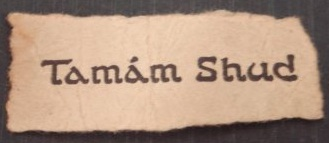
The scrap of paper, with its distinctive font, found hidden in the dead man's trousers, torn from the last page of a rare New Zealand edition of The Rubaiyat of Omar Khayyam

Around the same time as the inquest, a tiny piece of rolled-up paper with the words "Tamám Shud" printed on it was found in a fob pocket sewn within the dead man's trouser pocket. Public library officials called in to translate the text identified it as a phrase meaning "ended" or "finished" found on the last page of Rubaiyat of Omar Khayyam. The paper's verso side was blank. Police conducted an Australia-wide search to find a copy of the book that had a similarly blank verso. A photograph of the scrap of paper was released to the press.

Following a public appeal by police, the copy of Rubaiyat from which the page had been torn was located. A man showed police a 1941 edition of Edward FitzGerald's (1859) translation of Rubaiyat, published by Whitcombe and Tombs in Christchurch, New Zealand. (Note: This particular edition of the Rubaiyat has a different translation compared to most other FitzGerald translations. This, now rare, edition was published in New Zealand in 1941.) Detective Sergeant Lionel Leane, who led the initial investigation, often protected the privacy of witnesses in public statements by using pseudonyms; Leane referred to the man who found the book by the pseudonym "Ronald Francis" and he has never been officially identified. "Francis" had not considered that the book might be connected to the case until he had seen an article in the previous day's newspaper.

There is some uncertainty about the circumstances under which the book was found. One newspaper article refers to the book being found about a week or two before the body was found. Former South Australian Police detective Gerry Feltus (who dealt with the matter as a cold case) reports that the book was found "just after that man was found on the beach at Somerton". The timing is significant as the man is presumed, based on the suitcase, to have arrived in Adelaide the day before he was found on the beach. If the book was found one or two weeks before, it suggests that the man had visited previously or had been in Adelaide for a longer period. Most accounts state that the book was found in an open-roof car parked on Jetty Road, Glenelg – either in the rear floor well, or on the back seat. (Note: However, a bus conductor named Leslie Francis Wytkin (or Wytkins) handed in a copy of the Rubaiyat to the Metropolitan Tramways Trust, at around the same time; it is not clear whether this was the same copy of the Rubaiyat, or an extraneous find, and/or if Wytkin was "Francis".)

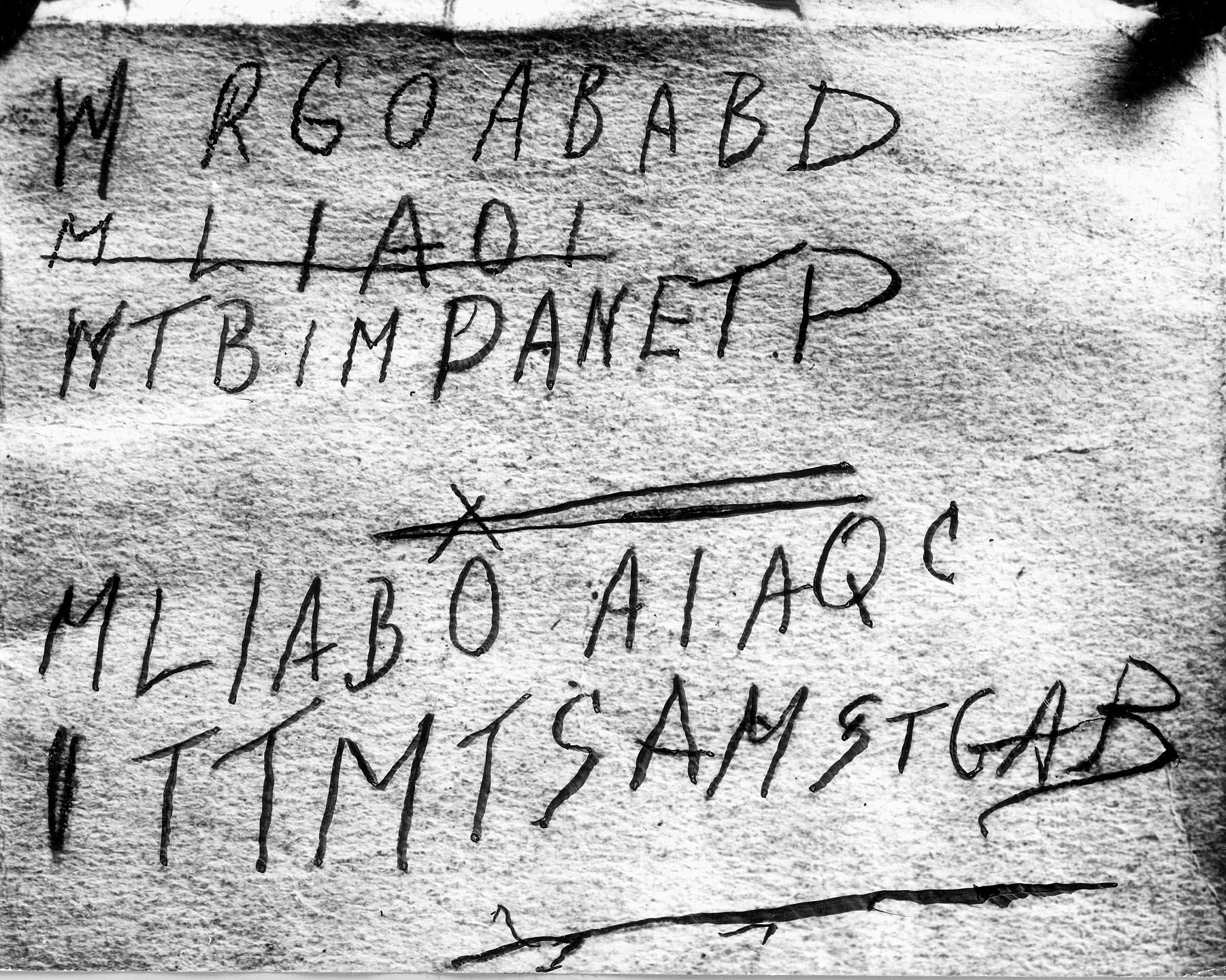
The handwriting found in the back of the Rubáiyát of Omar Khayyám. The text is presumed to be some sort of code.

The theme of Rubaiyat is that one should live life to the fullest and have no regrets when it ends. The poem's subject led some police to theorise that the man had committed suicide by poison, although at the Coronial Inquest police gave the paper no significance, and no other evidence corroborated the theory. The book was missing the words "Tamám Shud" on the last page, which had a blank reverse, and microscopic tests indicated that the piece of paper was from the page torn from the book. In the back of the book were faint indentations representing five lines of text, in capital letters. The second line has been struck out – a fact considered significant due to its similarities to the fourth line and the possibility that it represents an error in encryption.

W RGOABABD
~~M LIAOI~~
WTBIMPANETP
~~x~~
MLIABO AIAQC
ITTMTSAMSTGAB

In the book, it is unclear whether the first line begins with an "M" or "W", but it is widely believed to be the letter W, owing to the distinctive difference when compared to the stricken letter M. There appears to be a deleted or underlined line of text that reads "MLIAOI". Although the last character in this line of text looks like an "L", it is fairly clear on closer inspection of the image that this is formed from an "I" and the extension of the line used to delete or underline that line of text. Also, the other "L" has a curve to the bottom part of the character. There is also an "X" above the last "O" in the code, and it is not known if this is significant to the code or not.

==== Attempts to decode ====
Initially, the letters were thought to be words in a foreign language before it was realised it was a code. Code experts were called in at the time to decipher the lines, but were unsuccessful, and amateurs also attempted to crack the code.

In 1978, following a request from ABC Television's journalist Stuart Littlemore, Department of Defence cryptographers analysed the handwritten text. The cryptographers reported that it would be impossible to provide "a satisfactory answer": if the text were an encrypted message, its brevity meant that it had "insufficient symbols" from which a clear meaning could be extracted, and the text could be the "meaningless" product of a "disturbed mind".

In 2004, retired detective Gerry Feltus suggested in a Sunday Mail article that the final line "ITTMTSAMSTGAB" could stand for the initials of "It's Time To Move To South Australia Moseley Street..." (Jessica Thomson lived in Moseley Street which is the main road through Glenelg). In 2009 to 2011, Derek Abbott's team concluded that it was most likely that each letter was the first letter of a word. A 2014 analysis by computational linguist John Rehling strongly supports the theory that the letters consist of the initials of some English text, but finds no match for these in a large survey of literature, and concludes that the letters were likely written as a form of shorthand, not as a code, and that the original text can likely never be determined.

=== Jessica Thomson and Alf Boxall ===
A telephone number was also found in the back of the book, belonging to a nurse named Jessica Ellen "Jo" Thomson (1921–2007) – born Jessie Harkness in the Sydney suburb of Marrickville, New South Wales – who lived in Moseley St, Glenelg, about 400 metres (1,300 ft) north of the location where the body was found. When she was interviewed by police, Thomson said that she did not know the dead man or why he would have her phone number and choose to visit her suburb on the night of his death. However, she also reported that, at some time in late 1948, an unidentified man had attempted to visit her and asked a next door neighbour about her. In his book on the case, Gerry Feltus stated that when he interviewed Thomson in 2002, he found that she was either being "evasive" or she "just did not wish to talk about it". Feltus believed Thomson knew the Somerton man's identity. Thomson's daughter Kate, in a television interview in 2014 with Channel Nine's 60 Minutes, also said that she believed her mother knew the dead man.

In 1949, Jessica Thomson requested that police not keep a permanent record of her name or release her details to third parties, as it would be embarrassing and harmful to her reputation to be linked to such a case. The police agreed – a decision that hampered later investigations. In news media, books and other discussions of the case, Thomson was frequently referred to by various pseudonyms, including the nickname "Jestyn" and names such as "Teresa Johnson née Powell". Feltus in 2010 claimed he was given permission by Thomson's family to disclose her names and that of her husband, Prosper Thomson. Nevertheless, the names Feltus used in his book were pseudonyms. Feltus also stated that her family did not know of her connection with the case, and he agreed not to disclose her identity or anything that might reveal it. Thomson's real name was considered important because it may be the decryption key for the purported code.

When she was shown the plaster cast bust of the dead man by DS Leane, Thomson said she could not identify the person depicted. Leane described her reaction upon seeing the cast as "completely taken aback, to the point of giving the appearance that she was about to faint". In an interview many years later, Paul Lawson, the technician who made the cast and was present when Thomson viewed it, noted that after looking at the bust she immediately looked away and would not look at it again.

Thomson also said that while she was working at Royal North Shore Hospital in Sydney during World War II, she had owned a copy of Rubaiyat. In 1945, at the Clifton Gardens Hotel in Sydney, she had given it to an Australian Army lieutenant named Alf Boxall, who was serving at the time in the Water Transport Section of the Royal Australian Engineers. (Note: Boxall was born in London on 16 April 1906, enlisted in the Australian Army on 12 January 1942 and was not discharged until 12 April 1948."World War II Nominal Roll, "Boxall, Alfred". Australian War Memorial. Archived from the original on 12 July 2018.) Thomson told police that, after the war ended, she had moved to Melbourne and married. She said that she had received a letter from Boxall and had replied, telling him that she was now married. (Subsequent research suggests that her future husband, Prosper Thomson, was in the process of obtaining a divorce from his first wife in 1949, and that he did not marry Jessica until mid-1950.) (Note: In July 1947, Jessica "Jestyn" Harkness gave birth to her son Robin in Melbourne, at which point she was not married. Shortly afterwards she moved to Adelaide and was listed in telephone directories under the surname of her future husband, Prosper Thomson. They may or may not have been cohabiting. Accounts of conversations between Jessica Thomson and police suggest she told them that she was "married" or "recently married". There is no evidence that police knew in 1949 that she was not married. However, the police may have been aware of her domestic arrangements; it was the kind of information that would normally have been of interest to them. After Prosper Thomson's divorce from his first wife had been finalised (in early 1950), Jessica and Prosper Thomson were married in May 1950.) There is no evidence that Boxall had any contact with Jessica Thomson after 1945.

As a result of their conversations with Thomson, police suspected that Boxall was the dead man. However, in July 1949, Boxall was found in Sydney and the final page of his copy of Rubaiyat (reportedly a 1924 edition published in Sydney) was intact, with the words "Tamam Shud" still in place. Boxall was now working in the maintenance section at the Randwick Bus Depot (where he had worked before the war) and was unaware of any link between the dead man and himself. In the front of the copy of Rubaiyat that was given to Boxall, Jessica Harkness had signed herself "JEstyn" [sic] and written out verse 70:

Indeed, indeed, Repentance oft before
I swore—but was I sober when I swore?
And then and then came Spring, and Rose-in-hand
My thread-bare Penitence a-pieces tore.

=== Media reaction ===
The two daily Adelaide newspapers, The Advertiser and The News, covered the death in separate ways. The Advertiser first mentioned the case in a small article on page three of its morning edition of 2 December 1948. Titled "Body found on Beach", it read:

A body, believed to be of E.C. Johnson, about 45, of Arthur St, Payneham, was found on Somerton Beach, opposite the Crippled Children's Home yesterday morning. The discovery was made by Mr J. Lyons, of Whyte Rd, Somerton. Detective H. Strangway and Constable J. Moss are enquiring.

The News featured their story on its first page, giving more details of the dead man.

As one journalist wrote in June 1949, alluding to the line in Rubaiyat, "the Somerton Man seems to have made certain that the glass would be empty, save for speculation". An editorial called the case "one of Australia's most profound mysteries" and noted that if he died by poison so rare and obscure it could not be identified by toxicology experts, then surely the culprit's advanced knowledge of toxic substances pointed to something more serious than a mere domestic poisoning.

=== Early reported identifications ===
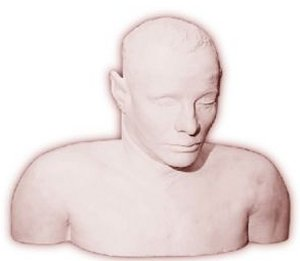
A plaster cast of the unknown man's head and chest taken by the police in 1949

A number of possible identifications have been proposed over the years. On 3 December 1948, a day after The Advertiser named him as the likely victim, E.C. Johnson identified himself at a police station. That same day, The News published a photograph of the dead man on its front page, leading to additional calls from members of the public about his possible identity. By 4 December, police had announced that the man's fingerprints were not on South Australian police records, forcing them to look further afield. On 5 December, The Advertiser reported that police were searching through military records after a man claimed to have had a drink with a person resembling the dead man at a hotel in Glenelg on 13 November. During their drinking session, the mystery man supposedly produced a military pension card bearing the name "Solomonson".

In early January 1949, two people identified the body as that of 63-year-old former wood cutter Robert Walsh. A third person, James Mack, also viewed the body, initially could not identify it, but an hour later he contacted police to claim it was Walsh. Mack stated that the reason he did not confirm this at the viewing was a difference in the colour of the hair. Walsh had left Adelaide several months earlier to buy sheep in Queensland but had failed to return at Christmas as planned. Police were skeptical, believing Walsh to be too old to be the dead man. However, the police did state that the body was consistent with that of a man who had been a wood cutter, although the state of the man's hands indicated he had not cut wood for at least 18 months. Any thoughts that a positive identification had been made were quashed, however, when Elizabeth Thompson, one of the people who had earlier positively identified the body as Walsh, retracted her statement after a second viewing of the body, where the absence of a particular scar on the body, as well as the size of the dead man's legs, led her to realise the body was not Walsh.

By early February 1949, there had been eight different "positive" identifications of the body, including two Darwin men who thought the body was of a friend of theirs, and others who thought it was a missing station worker, a worker on a steamship or a Swedish man. Detectives from Victoria initially believed the man was from there because of the similarity of the laundry marks to those used by several dry-cleaning firms in Melbourne. Following publication of the man's photograph in Victoria, 28 people claimed to know his identity. Victoria detectives disproved all the claims and said that "other investigations" indicated it was unlikely that he was from Victoria. A seaman named Tommy Reade from the SS Cycle, in port at the time, was thought to be the dead man, but after some of his shipmates viewed the body at the morgue, they stated categorically that the corpse was not that of Reade. By November 1953, police announced they had recently received the 251st "solution" to the identity of the body from members of the public who claimed to have met or known him but they said that the "only clue of any value" remained the clothing the man wore.

=== Mangnoson family ===
Contemporary reports considered the connection with the death of a two-year-old boy six months later.

On 6 June 1949, the body of two-year-old Clive Mangnoson was found in a sack in the Largs Bay sand hills, about 20 kilometres (12 mi) north of Somerton Park. Lying next to him was his unconscious father, Keith Waldemar Mangnoson. (Note: Mangnoson was born in Adelaide on 4 May 1914 and served as a private in the Australian Army from 11 June 1941 until his discharge on 7 February 1945. World War II Nominal Roll, "Mangnoson, Keith Waldemar". Retrieved 2 March 2009) The father was taken to a hospital in a very weak condition, suffering from exposure; following a medical examination, he was transferred to a mental hospital. The Mangnosons had been missing for four days. The police believed that Clive had been dead for 24 hours when his body was found. The two were found by Neil McRae (Note: McRae was born on 11 May 1915 in Goodwood, South Australia, World War II Nominal Roll, "McRae, Neil". Retrieved 2 March 2009) of Largs Bay, who claimed he had seen the location of the two in a dream the night before. The coroner could not determine the young Mangnoson's cause of death, although it was not believed to be natural causes. The contents of the boy's stomach were sent to a government analyst for further examination.

Following the death, the boy's mother, Roma Mangnoson, reported having been threatened by a masked man who, while driving a battered cream car, almost ran her down outside her home in Cheapside Street, Largs North. Mangnoson stated that "the car stopped and a man with a khaki handkerchief over his face told her to 'keep away from the police or else'". Additionally a similar-looking man had been recently seen lurking around the house. Mangnoson believed that this situation could be related to her husband's attempt to identify the Somerton Man, believing him to be Carl Thompsen, who had worked with him in Renmark in 1939. Soon after being interviewed by police over her harassment, Mangnoson collapsed and required medical treatment.

J. M. Gower, secretary of the Largs North Progress Association, received anonymous phone calls threatening that Mrs. Mangnoson would meet with an accident if he interfered while A. H. Curtis, the acting mayor of Port Adelaide, received three anonymous phone calls threatening "an accident" if he "stuck his nose into the Mangnoson affair". Police suspect the calls may be a hoax and the caller may be the same person who also terrorised a woman in a nearby suburb who had recently lost her husband in tragic circumstances.

=== International interest ===
In addition to intense public interest in Australia during the late 1940s and early 1950s, the case also attracted international attention. South Australia Police consulted their counterparts overseas and distributed information about the dead man internationally, in an effort to identify him. International circulation of a photograph of the man and details of his fingerprints yielded no positive identification. For example, in the United States, the Federal Bureau of Investigation was unable to match the dead man's fingerprint with prints taken from files of domestic criminals. Scotland Yard was also asked to assist with the case, but could not offer any insights.

== Post-inquest ==
=== Pre–2009 ===
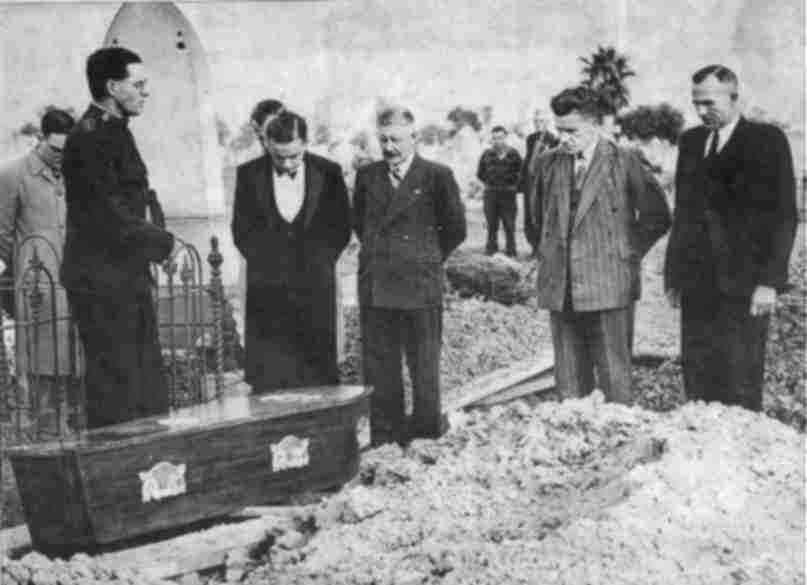
Burial of the Somerton Man on 14 June 1949. By his grave site is Salvation Army Captain Em Webb, leading the prayers, attended by reporters and police.

In 1949, the body of the unknown man was buried in Adelaide's West Terrace Cemetery, where the Salvation Army conducted the service. The South Australian Grandstand Bookmakers Association paid for the service to save the man from a pauper's burial.

Years after the burial, flowers began appearing on the grave. Police questioned a woman seen leaving the cemetery but she claimed she knew nothing of the man. About the same time, Ina Harvey, the receptionist from the Strathmore Hotel opposite Adelaide railway station, revealed that a strange man had stayed in Room 21 or 23 for a few days around the time of the death, checking out on 30 November 1948. She recalled that he was English speaking and only carrying a small black case, not unlike one a musician or a doctor might carry. When an employee looked inside the case he told Harvey he had found an object inside the case he described as looking like a "needle". On 22 November 1959, it was reported that one E.B. Collins, an inmate of New Zealand's Whanganui Prison, claimed to know the identity of the dead man.

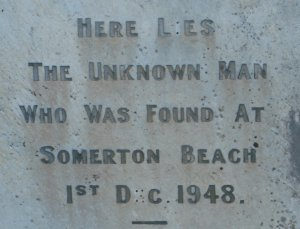
The simple burial site of the Unknown Man at the West Terrace Cemetery in Adelaide

In 1978, ABC-TV, in its documentary series Inside Story, produced a programme on the Tamám Shud case, titled "The Somerton Beach Mystery", where reporter Stuart Littlemore investigated the case, including interviewing Boxall, who could add no new information, and Paul Lawson, who made the plaster cast of the body and who refused to answer a question about whether anyone had positively identified the body.

In 1994, John Harber Phillips, Chief Justice of Victoria and Chairman of the Victorian Institute of Forensic Medicine, reviewed the case to determine the cause of death and concluded that, "There seems little doubt it was digitalis." Phillips supported his conclusion by pointing out that the organs were engorged, consistent with digitalis, the lack of evidence of natural disease and "the absence of anything seen macroscopically which could account for the death".

Former South Australian Chief Superintendent Len Brown, who worked on the case in the 1940s, stated that he believed that the man was from a country in the Warsaw Pact, which led to the police's inability to confirm the man's identity.

The South Australian Police Historical Society holds the plaster bust, which contains strands of the man's hair. Any further attempts to identify the body have been hampered by the embalming formaldehyde having destroyed much of the man's DNA. Other key evidence no longer exists, such as the brown suitcase, which was destroyed in 1986. In addition, witness statements have disappeared from the police file over the years.

==== Spy theories ====
There has been persistent speculation that the dead man was a spy, due to the circumstances and historical context of his death. At least two sites relatively close to Adelaide were of interest to spies: the Radium Hill uranium mine and the Woomera Test Range, an Anglo-Australian military research facility. The man's death also coincided with a reorganisation of Australian security agencies, which would culminate the following year with the founding of the Australian Security Intelligence Organisation (ASIO). This would be followed by a crackdown on Soviet espionage in Australia, which was revealed by intercepts of Soviet communications under the Venona project.

Another theory concerns Boxall, who was reportedly involved in intelligence work during and immediately after World War II. In a 1978 television interview Stuart Littlemore asked, "Mr Boxall, you had been working, hadn't you, in an intelligence unit, before you met this young woman, Jessica Harkness. Did you talk to her about that at all?" In reply, Boxall said "no", and when asked if Harkness could have known, Boxall replied, "Not unless somebody else told her." When Littlemore suggested in the interview that there may have been an espionage connection to the dead man in Adelaide, Boxall replied, "It's quite a melodramatic thesis, isn't it?" Boxall's army service record suggests that he served initially in the 4th Water Transport Company, before being seconded to the North Australia Observer Unit (NAOU)—a special operations unit—and that during his time with NAOU, Boxall rose rapidly in rank, being promoted from lance corporal to lieutenant within three months.

=== H. C. Reynolds theory ===
In 2011, an Adelaide woman contacted biological anthropologist Maciej Henneberg about an identification card of an H. C. Reynolds that she had found in her father's possessions. The card, a document issued in the United States to foreign seamen during World War I, was given to Henneberg in October 2011 for comparison of the ID photograph to that of the Somerton man. While Henneberg found anatomical similarities in features such as the nose, lips and eyes, he believed they were not as reliable as the close similarity of the ear. The ear shapes shared by both men were a "very good" match, although Henneberg also found what he called a "unique identifier"; a mole on the cheek that was the same shape and in the same position in both photographs. "Together with the similarity of the ear characteristics, this mole, in a forensic case, would allow me to make a rare statement positively identifying the Somerton man."

The ID card, numbered 58757, was issued in the United States on 28 February 1918 to H. C. Reynolds, giving his nationality as "British" and age as 18. Searches conducted by the US National Archives, the UK National Archives and the Australian War Memorial Research Centre have failed to find any records relating to H. C. Reynolds. The South Australia Police Major Crime Branch, who still have the case listed as open, will investigate the new information. Some independent researchers believe the ID card belonged to Horace Charles Reynolds, a Tasmanian man who died in 1953 and therefore could not have been the Somerton man.

=== Jessica Thomson's relatives ===
Prosper Thomson died in 1995 and Jessica Thomson died in 2007. In November 2013, three of their relatives gave interviews to the Channel Nine current affairs program 60 Minutes.

Kate Thomson, the daughter of Jessica and Prosper Thomson, said that her mother was the woman interviewed by the police and that her mother had told her she had lied to them – Jessica did know the identity of the Somerton man and his identity was also "known to a level higher than the police force". She suggested that her mother and the Somerton man may both have been spies, noting that Jessica Thomson taught English to migrants, was interested in communism, and could speak Russian, although she would not disclose to Kate where she had learned it or why.

Roma Egan, the widow of Jessica Thomson's son Robin, and Robin and Roma's daughter Rachel Egan, also appeared on 60 Minutes. They suggested that the Somerton man was Robin's father and, therefore, Rachel's grandfather. The Egans reported lodging a new application with the Attorney-General John Rau to have the Somerton man's body exhumed and DNA tested. University of Adelaide professor Derek Abbott subsequently wrote to Rau in support of the Egans, saying that exhumation for DNA testing would be consistent with the federal government's policy of identifying soldiers in war graves, to bring closure to their families. Kate Thomson opposed the exhumation as being disrespectful to her brother.

=== Exhumation ===
In October 2011, as interest in the case resurfaced, Attorney-General John Rau refused to exhume the body, stating, "There needs to be public interest reasons that go well beyond public curiosity or broad scientific interest." Feltus said he was still contacted by people in Europe who believed the man was a missing relative but did not believe an exhumation and finding the man's family grouping would provide answers to relatives, as "during that period so many war criminals changed their names and came to different countries".

In October 2019, however, Attorney-General Vickie Chapman granted approval for his body to be exhumed to extract DNA for analysis. The parties interested in the analysis agreed to cover the costs. A potential granddaughter's DNA was planned to be compared to the unknown man's to see if it was a match.

An exhumation was carried out on 19 May 2021. Police stated that the remains were in "reasonable" condition and were optimistic about the prospect of DNA recovery. The remains were deeper in the ground than previously thought. It was reported that the body was exhumed as part of Operation Persevere and Operation Persist, which are investigating historical unidentified remains in South Australia. The authorities have said that they intend to take DNA from the remains if possible. Anne Coxon, the Assistant Director of Operations at Forensic Science South Australia, said, "The technology available to us now is clearly light years ahead of the techniques available when this body was discovered in the late 1940s," and that tests would use "every method at our disposal to try and bring closure to this enduring mystery".

=== Abbott investigation ===
In March 2009, a University of Adelaide team led by Derek Abbott began an attempt to solve the case through cracking the code and proposing to exhume the body to test for DNA. His investigations have led to questions concerning the assumptions police had made on the case. Abbott also tracked down the Barbour waxed cotton of the period and found packaging variations. This may provide clues to the country where it was purchased.

It was determined the letter frequency of the message in the back of the Rubaiyat was considerably different from letters written down randomly; the frequency was to be further tested to determine if the alcohol level of the writer could alter random distribution. They observed that the format of the code also appeared to follow the quatrain format of Rubaiyat, leading them to theorise that the code was a one-time pad encryption algorithm. Copies of Rubaiyat, as well as the Talmud and Bible, were being compared to the code using computers to get a statistical base for letter frequencies. However, the code's short length meant the investigators would require the exact edition of the book used. With the original copy lost in the 1950s, researchers have been looking for a FitzGerald edition. The team concluded that it was most likely that each letter was the first letter of a word.

An investigation had shown that the Somerton man's autopsy reports of 1948 and 1949 are now missing and the Barr Smith Library's collection of Cleland's notes do not contain anything on the case. Maciej Henneberg, professor of anatomy at the University of Adelaide, examined images of the Somerton man's ears and found that his cymba (upper ear hollow) is larger than his cavum (lower ear hollow), a feature possessed by only 1–2% of the Caucasian population. In May 2009, Abbott consulted with dental experts who concluded that the Somerton Man had hypodontia (a rare genetic disorder) of both lateral incisors, a feature present in only 2% of the general population. In June 2010, Abbott obtained a photograph of Jessica Thomson's eldest son Robin, which clearly showed that he – like the unknown man – had not only a larger cymba than cavum but also hypodontia. The chance that this was a coincidence has been estimated as between one in 10,000,000 and one in 20,000,000. The media have suggested that Robin Thomson, who was 16 months old in 1948 and died in 2009, may have been a child of either Boxall or the Somerton man and passed off as Prosper Thomson's son. DNA testing would confirm or eliminate this speculation. Abbott believes an exhumation and an autosomal DNA test could link the Somerton man to a shortlist of surnames which, along with existing clues to the man's identity, would be the "final piece of the puzzle".

After discovering that Robin Thomson had died in 2009, Abbott contacted Rachel, the daughter of Roma Egan and Robin Thomson, who had been adopted and grew up in New Zealand. Abbott and Rachel married in 2010 and they have three children. The family has a painting of the Somerton man in their home, believing him to be family. However, Rachel Egan's DNA has been analysed and links were found to the grandparents of Prosper Thomson.

In July 2013, Abbott released an artistic impression he commissioned of the Somerton man, believing this might finally lead to an identification. "All this time we've been publishing the autopsy photo, and it's hard to tell what something looks like from that", Abbott said.

In December 2017, Abbott announced three "excellent" hairs "at the right development stage for extracting DNA" had been found on the plaster cast of the corpse, and had been submitted for analysis to the Australian Centre for Ancient DNA at the University of Adelaide. Processing the results could reportedly take up to a year. While much of the DNA is degraded, in February 2018, the University of Adelaide team obtained a high-definition analysis of the mitochondrial DNA from the hair sample from Somerton Man. They found that the Somerton Man belonged to haplogroup H4a1a1a, possessed by only 1% of Europeans. However, mitochondrial DNA is only inherited through the maternal line, and therefore cannot be used to investigate a hereditary link between Rachel Egan, Abbott's wife, and the Somerton Man.

=== Potential identification ===
On 26 July 2022, Abbott announced that he and genealogist Colleen Fitzpatrick had determined that the man was Carl "Charles" Webb, an electrical engineer and instrument maker born on 16 November 1905, in Footscray, a suburb of Melbourne. Abbott claimed his DNA identification came from strands of hair found in the plaster death mask made by South Australian Police in the late 1940s. Through investigative genetic genealogy, matches were found for descendants of two distant cousins of Webb, on both the paternal and the maternal side.

By the time the identification was made, none of Webb's still-living relatives had known him personally. Initially, there were no known pre-death photographs of Webb, but an independent researcher discovered a 1921 photograph of a Swinburne Technical College football team that included a "C. Webb", without identifying him directly. In November 2022, Australian Story revealed photographs of Webb from the 1920s found in a Webb family photo album. Earlier, the ABC had published photos of Webb's brother, Roy Webb, claiming they resembled the Somerton Man.

Abbott and Fitzpatrick believe that Webb had serious mental health issues and "spiralled down" after losing four close relatives in seven years. His history and the autopsy findings suggest he died by suicide by poisoning himself. Forensic Science South Australia, who were still investigating, declined to comment on Abbott's findings. South Australia Police had not verified the result, but stated they were "cautiously optimistic that this may provide a breakthrough".

==== Carl Webb ====
Carl "Charles" Webb was born on 16 November 1905, in Footscray, a suburb of Melbourne, the youngest of six children. Carl Webb's father, Richard August Webb (1866–1939), had emigrated to Australia from Hamburg, Germany. He married Eliza Amelia Morris Grace (1871–1946) in 1892. They opened a bakery in Springvale, Victoria and the family's three sons would all eventually work there. When the bakery closed down, Webb retrained as an electrical instrument maker. Webb's older brother, Roy Webb, had died in Burma in 1943, while he was a prisoner of war and apparently undergoing forced labour on the Thailand-Burma Railway. Webb's oldest sister, Freda Grace Keane (née Webb), had a son named John, who had died in the United Kingdom, while serving with the Royal Australian Air Force (RAAF), also in 1943.

On 4 October 1941, Webb married Dorothy "Doff" Robertson, a pharmacist and chiropodist. The couple moved into a flat in Bromby Street, South Yarra. She later said that the marriage was not a harmonious one, largely due to Webb's personality. She described him as solitary, having few friends, living a quiet life and being in bed by 7 p.m. each night, but also moody, violent and threatening, especially when facing defeat even over relatively trivial matters. She stated he was fond of poetry and wrote several poems of his own, "most of them on the subject of death, which he claims to be his greatest desire". This would be consistent with the copy of the Rubaiyat, which also focuses on the subject of death. Abbott's research indicates Webb enjoyed betting on horses; thus, the coded messages in the book could be horse names.

Dorothy Webb also said that, in March 1946, her husband had attempted suicide with an overdose of ether, that she had then nursed him back to health and he had scolded her for it, and had become more violent. In September 1946, she fled from her husband, alleging years of physical and verbal abuse. Webb had moved out in 1947 and no official records revealing his subsequent whereabouts had been found. Members of the Webb family subsequently mentioned that he had moved to the Perth suburb of Cottesloe, but that they had lost contact with him there. By 1951, Dorothy Webb was reportedly living in Bute, South Australia, 144 km (89 mi) from Adelaide. Abbott speculates that Webb may have gone to Adelaide intending to find her. She applied for a divorce on 5 June 1951, citing desertion, resulting in a hearing on 29 October, and the divorce was granted in April 1952.

Webb's brother-in-law John Keane's possessions included items which suggested that he had been to the United States, such as coins and a map of Chicago (possibly as a result of him undergoing aircrew training in Canada en route to the UK). Keane and Webb lived a 20-minute drive away from each other. This might explain why the Somerton Man was wearing clothes believed to be American, with the name Keane on them.

=== Other possible identifications ===
On 4 January 2022, former Adelaide lawyer Sophie Holsman nominated Austrian milliner Carl/Charles Josef Halban as the Somerton Man.

== Timeline ==
- 17 September 1902: Carl/Charles Josef Halban born in Vienna, Austria-Hungary.
- circa 1903: Somerton Man is born, according to the coroner's report.
- 16 November 1905: Carl "Charles" Webb is born in Footscray, Melbourne, Victoria.
- April 1906: Alfred Boxall is born in London, England.
- 16 October 1912: Prosper Thomson is born in central Queensland.
- 28 February 1918: H.C. Reynolds identity card issued.
- 1921: Jessie Harkness is born in Marrickville, New South Wales.
- 1936: Prosper Thomson moves from Blacktown, New South Wales, to Melbourne, Victoria, marries and lives in Mentone, a south east Melbourne suburb.
- August 1945: Jessica Harkness gives Alf Boxall an inscribed copy of Rubaiyat over drinks at the Clifton Gardens Hotel, Sydney, prior to his being posted overseas on active service. The inscription is signed "JEstyn".
- circa October 1946: Jessica Harkness's son Robin is conceived (assuming a normal duration pregnancy).
- Late 1946: Harkness moves to Mentone to temporarily live with her parents. (The same Melbourne suburb in which Prosper Thomson had established himself and his then new wife ten years before.)
- Early 1947: Harkness moves to a suburb of Adelaide, South Australia, and changes her surname to Thomson, the name of her future husband.
- April 1947: Charles Webb leaves his wife Dorothy, whereupon she files for divorce.
- July 1947: Robin Thomson is born.
- 15 January 1948: Boxall arrives back in Sydney from his last active duty and is discharged from the army in April 1948.
- July 1948: "Prosper McTaggart Thomson, hire car proprietor, of Moseley Street, Glenelg" appears in Adelaide Local Court as defendant in a car sale dispute, dating from November 1947, establishing Prosper Thomson as active in Adelaide from 1947.
- 30 November 1948. 8:30 am to 10:50 am: The Somerton Man is presumed to have arrived in Adelaide by train. He buys a ticket for the 10:50 am train to Henley Beach but does not use it. This ticket is the first sold of only three issued between 6:15 am and 2 pm by the particular ticket clerk for the Henley Beach train.
- Between 8:30 am to 10:50 am: There is no satisfactory explanation for what the Somerton Man does during these hours. There is no record of the Adelaide railway station's bathroom facilities being unavailable and no ticket in his pocket to suggest he visited the Public Baths, outside of the station.
- Between 11:00 am and 11:15 am: Checks a brown suitcase into the railway station cloak room.
- after 11:15 am: Buys a 7d bus ticket on a bus that departed at 11:15 am from the south side of North Terrace (in front of the Strathmore Hotel) opposite the railway station. He may have boarded at a later time elsewhere in the city as his ticket was the sixth of nine sold between the railway station and South Terrace; however, he had only a 15-minute window from the earliest time he could have checked his suitcase (the luggage room was around 60 metres from the bus stop). It is not known which stop he alights at; the bus terminates at Somerton Park at 11:44 am and enquiries indicate that he "must have" alighted at Glenelg, a short distance from the St. Leonard's hotel. This stop is less than 1 kilometre (3,300 ft) north of the Moseley St address of Jessica Thomson, which was itself 400 metres from where the body was found.
- 7–8 pm: Various witness sightings.
- 10–11 pm: Estimated time he had eaten a pasty based on time of death.
- 1 December 2 am: Estimated time of death. The time is estimated by a "quick opinion" on the state of rigor mortis while the ambulance is in transit. As poisons affect the progression of rigor, 2 am is probably inaccurate.
- 6:30 am: Found dead by John Lyons and two men.
- 14 January 1949: Adelaide railway station finds the brown suitcase belonging to the man.
- 6–14 June: The piece of paper bearing the inscription "Tamám Shud" is found in a concealed fob pocket.
- 17 and 21 June: Coroner's inquest.
- 22 July: A man hands in the copy of Rubaiyat he had found on 30 November (or perhaps a week or two earlier). Using a UV light, Police detect an unlisted phone number and mysterious inscription in the book. Police later match the "Tamám Shud" paper to the book.
- 26 July: The unlisted phone number discovered in the book is traced to a woman living in Glenelg (Jessica Thomson, previously Harkness). Shown the plaster cast by Paul Lawson, she does not identify the man as Alf Boxall, or any other person. Lawson's diary entry for that day names her as "Mrs Thompson", she was 27 years old in 1948. In a later interview Lawson describes her behaviour as being very odd that day. She appeared as if she was about to faint. Jessica Harkness requests that her real name be withheld because she does not want her husband to know she knew Alf Boxall. Although she is in fact not married at this time, the name she gives police is Jessica Thomson, with her real name not being discovered until 2002.
- 27 July: Sydney detectives locate and interview Boxall.
- Early 1950: Prosper Thomson's divorce is finalised.
- May 1950: Jessica and Prosper Thomson are married.
- 1951: Dorothy Webb reported to be living in Bute, South Australia.
- 1950s: The original Rubaiyat is lost.
- 18 May 1953: death of Horace Charles Reynolds, Tasmanian man born in 1900 and regarded by some investigators as the owner of the "H. C. Reynolds" ID card.
- 14 March 1958: The coroner's inquest is continued. The Thomsons and Alf Boxall are not mentioned. No new findings are recorded and the inquest is ended with an adjournment sine die.
- 1986: The Somerton Man's brown suitcase and contents are destroyed as "no longer required".
- 1994: The Chief Justice of Victoria, John Harber Phillips, studies the evidence and concludes that poisoning was due to digitalis.
- 26 April 1995: Prosper Thomson dies.
- 17 August 1995: Boxall dies.
- 13 May 2007: Jessica Thomson dies.
- 18 March 2009: Robin Thomson dies.
- 14 October 2019: Attorney-General of South Australia grants conditional approval for the Somerton Man to be exhumed in order for a DNA sample to be obtained.
- 19 May 2021: Exhumation takes place.
- 26 July 2022: Derek Abbott announces that his DNA analysis of hairs handed to him by South Australian police has identified the man as Carl "Charles" Webb, an electrical engineer and instrument maker born in Melbourne in 1905.

== See also ==
- Isdal Woman
- Peter Bergmann case
- Ricky McCormick's encrypted notes
- The Gentleman of Heligoland
- The Boy in the Box
- Body in the cylinder

== Media ==
=== Books ===
- Ruth Balint, "The Somerton Man: An unsolved history," Cultural Studies Review, Vol. 16, no. 2, pp. 159–78, 2010.
- Ruth Balint, "Der Somerton Man: Eine dokumentarische Fiktion in drei Dimensionen," Book Chapter in Goofy History: Fehler machen Geschichte, (Ed. Butis Butis) Böhlau Verlag, pp. 264–279, 2009, ISBN 9783412204266
- Michael Newton, The Encyclopedia of Unsolved Crimes, Infobase Publishing, 2009, ISBN 0-8160-7818-1.
- John Pinkney, Great Australian Mysteries: Unsolved, Unexplained, Unknown, Five Mile Press, Rowville, Victoria, 2003. ISBN 1-74124-024-7.
- Kerry Greenwood, Tamam Shud – The Somerton Man Mystery, University of New South Wales Publishing, 2013 ISBN 978-1742233505
- Peter Bowes, The Bookmaker From Rabaul – Bennison Books Publishing, 2016 ISBN 978-0-9954302-1-1
- Tamam Shud: The Somerton Man Mystery by Kerry Greenwood was published in 2012. ISBN 978-1-74224-128-9

=== Podcasts ===
- Casefile Archives 2: The Somerton Man, an updated production of Case 02: The Somerton Man, an episode of the Casefile true crime podcast series.
