= Peter Bergmann case =

Death of unidentified man in Ireland

"Peter Bergmann"
- Post-mortem photograph of "Peter Bergmann"
- Status: Unidentified for 17 years and 5 months
- Died: 16 June 2009; Rosses Point, County Sligo, Ireland
- Burial place: Sligo Town Cemetery, Ireland
- Other name: Sligo Man

The Peter Bergmann case pertains to the mysterious death of an unidentified man in County Sligo, Ireland, in the early hours of 16 June 2009. The man, using the alias "Peter Bergmann", had checked into the Sligo City Hotel on 12 June, where he stayed during the majority of his visit to Sligo. The man's movements were captured on CCTV throughout the town; however, the details of his actions and intentions remain unknown. His interactions with other people were limited, and little is known of his origins or the reason for his visit.

On the morning of 16 June 2009, the body of the unidentified man was discovered at Rosses Point beach, a popular recreation destination and fishing area near Sligo. Despite conducting a five-month investigation into his death, the Gardaí (Irish police force) have never been able to identify the man or develop any leads in the case.

The mystery is often compared to the Somerton Man case in Australia, in which an unidentified man was found dead on a beach in 1948 shortly after the Second World War, although the Bergmann case has not achieved nearly the same amount of notoriety or international coverage. This case remains obscure to the public, and the official investigation has not extended to outside of Ireland.

The case received renewed attention in the 2010s. It was the subject of a 2013 documentary, The Last Days of Peter Bergmann, which was shown at the 2014 Sundance Film Festival. The film has developed a small following on social media websites such as Reddit, where readers have constructed theories of the case.

== Arrival in Sligo ==
On Friday 12 June, the man was first seen at the Ulster Bus Depot in Derry between 14:30 and 16:00. He boarded a bus headed to Sligo carrying a black shoulder bag and a standard carry-on luggage bag. He arrived at Sligo bus station at 18:28 and took a taxi to the Sligo City Hotel, where he paid in cash per night. While checking in, he gave the false name "Peter Bergmann" and an address later reported as "Ainstettersn 15, 4472, Vienna, Austria."

He had a slender build, stood 1.79 metres (5 ft 10 in), had short grey hair, blue eyes, a tan complexion, and appeared to be in his late 50s or early 60s. Staff and tenants at the Sligo City Hotel said he was of Germanic descent and spoke English with a thick German accent. He was neatly groomed, clean shaven, and well dressed in a black leather jacket, blue trousers, socks, a black leather belt, and black shoes (size 44). His clothes were from C&A, a popular European fashion retail store with most of its stores in Germany and Austria. His appearance suggested he was a professional worker. He smoked frequently, and several surveillance videos show him smoking outside.

During his stay, CCTV footage recorded him leaving the hotel on several occasions carrying a purple plastic bag filled with items or personal effects. When he returned from his long walks, he no longer had the bag. Gardaí concluded that he had gradually disposed of his belongings throughout Sligo and then folded the bag and put it in his pocket. Authorities were unable to identify what he discarded, as he used blind spots in the surveillance system to his advantage. His movements were meticulous and methodical, as if he knew where to hide personal belongings that could have identified him.

On Saturday 13 June, he was seen walking to Sligo post office at 10:49, where he purchased eight 82-cent stamps and airmail stickers. The following day, he left the hotel between 11:00 and 11:30 and asked a taxi driver to recommend a quiet beach where he could swim. The driver suggested Rosses Point and took him there. After briefly looking at the beach, he returned with the same taxi and was dropped off at Sligo bus station.

== Monday 15 June ==
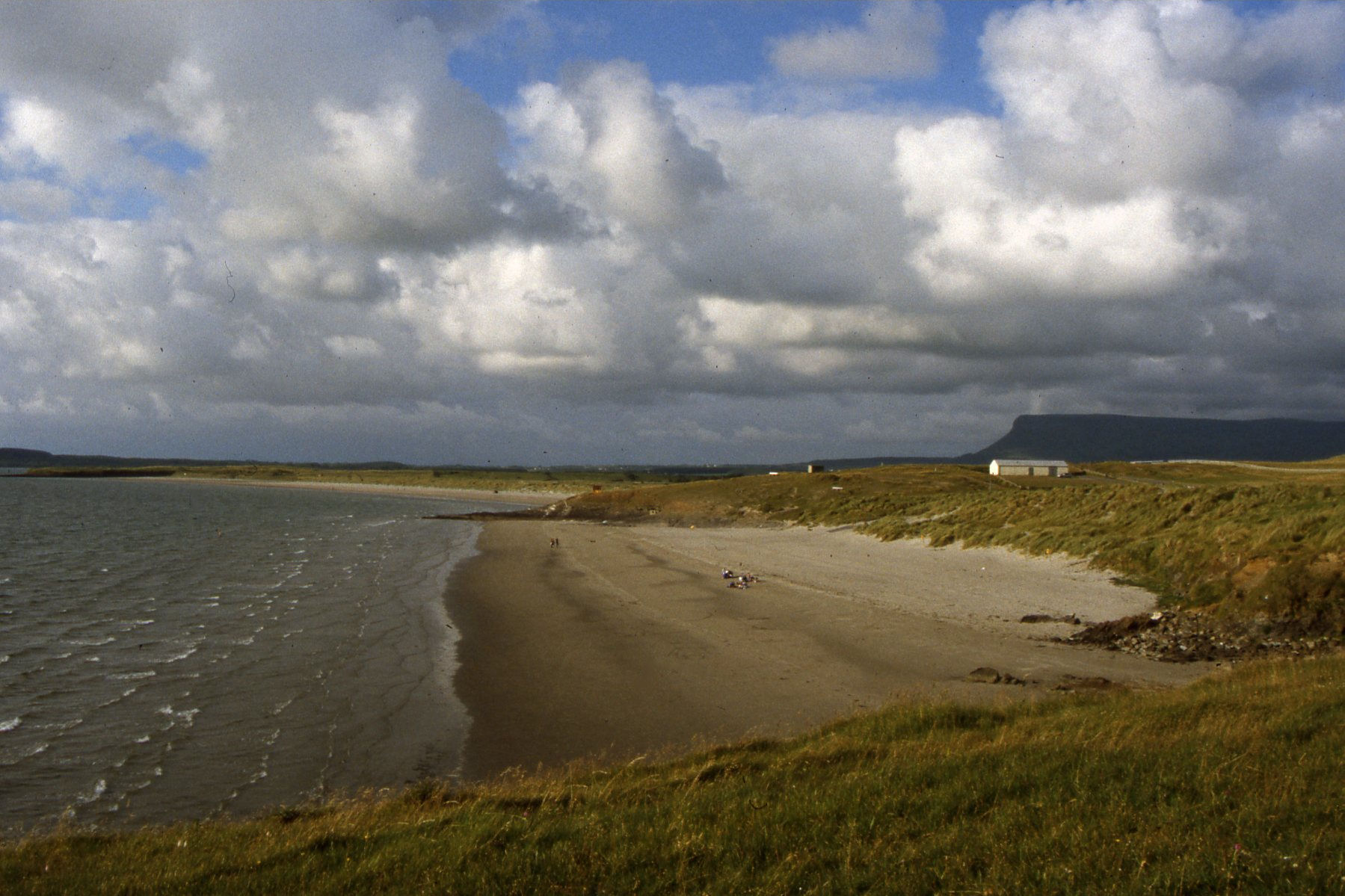
Beach at Rosses Point, Sligo, where Bergmann was last sighted alive and his body later found washed up (photographed 2003)

On Monday 15 June, the man checked out of the hotel at 13:06 and handed in his room key. He left carrying a black shoulder bag, a purple plastic bag, and a different black luggage bag. He no longer had the black carry‑on bag he had brought to Sligo. He walked to the bus station via Quay Street and Wine Street, then stopped at Quayside Shopping Centre and waited in the doorway for several minutes. At 13:16 he left the centre and continued along Wine Street towards the bus station, still carrying all three bags.

At 13:38 he ordered a cappuccino and a toasted ham and cheese sandwich at the bus station. While eating, he looked at pieces of paper taken from his pocket. After reading them, he tore the paper in half and threw it into a nearby rubbish bin. He then boarded a bus that departed at 14:20 for Rosses Point. Sixteen people reported seeing him walking on the beach, where he casually greeted passersby. The last confirmed sighting of him was at 23:50.

== Discovery of the body ==
At 06:45 on Tuesday 16 June, Arthur Kinsella and his son Brian, who was training for a triathlon, found the man's body lying on the beach. He was wearing purple striped Speedo-type swimming trunks, with his underpants over them and a navy T-shirt tucked in. Arthur and Brian called the Gardaí. At 08:10, Dr Valerie McGowan officially pronounced him dead. Following the discovery, Gardaí conducted a five‑month investigation into his identity.

== Investigation ==
According to the post-mortem report, the man's body was found on Rosses Point beach with most of his clothes left on the shore, and with no wallet, money, or form of identification. The labels on every item of clothing on his body had been removed. Although he had been washed up on the beach, pathologist Clive Kilgallen found no evidence of "classical salt water drowning", and no signs of foul play that would indicate homicide. The cause of death was recorded as acute cardiac arrest. His teeth were in good condition and showed signs of extensive dental work, including bridging, root canals, crowns, a full gold tooth on the upper back right side, and a small silver filling along the gum of a lower left tooth.

Despite his neat appearance, he was in very poor health. The post mortem showed advanced prostate cancer and bone tumours. His heart showed signs of previous ischaemic heart disease. Notably, the toxicology report stated that he had no medication of any kind in his system. The pathologist noted that, given his health status, he would have been in significant pain and would have required prescription pain medicine or at least over‑the‑counter pain relief.

Police searched databases for photographic, fingerprint, and DNA matches, but none matched. After a five-month investigation, the body was buried in an unmarked grave in Sligo. Four Gardaí attended the funeral.

Some sources state that, during the police investigation, it was found that the address he gave at the hotel belonged to a vacant lot. Others have pointed out that a street with the reported spelling of "Ainstettersn" does not exist in Austria or Germany. Vienna post codes begin with the number 1 rather than 4, and post code 4472 is unassigned. It is unclear how police could have established that the false address was tied to a vacant lot, or whether they simply determined that it did not exist. What is certain is that the man wanted to remain unknown and planned his movements so that he could not be identified.

In 2015, the French newspaper Le Monde reported that it had contacted Austrian police about the case, and that Austrian police said the Gardaí had never contacted them. Le Monde also reported that there is no Interpol notice for the unidentified man because the body did not fall into either of Interpol's categories for "missing person" or "wanted person". It is the responsibility of the man's country of origin to report him as missing.

He remains unidentified. No relatives or friends have come forward, despite public appeals in Austrian and German newspapers.

== See also ==
- Isdal Woman
- Joseph Newton Chandler III
- List of unsolved deaths
- Lori Erica Ruff
- Lyle Stevik
- Somerton Man
- Suzanne Sevakis
