= Murder of Susan Poupart =

1990 murder of American woman

Susan Poupart
- Undated photograph of Poupart
- Born: November 12, 1960
- Died: May 20, 1990 (aged 29); Lac du Flambeau, Wisconsin, United States
- Resting place: Memorial Cemetery, Lac du Flambeau, Vilas County, Wisconsin, United States
- Known for: Murder victim
- Children: 2

Susan Poupart (November 12, 1960 – May 20, 1990) was a Native American woman who disappeared in May 1990. Her body was discovered six months later. The murder currently remains unsolved, although a man was taken in for questioning for her death in 2007. Additionally, another pair of men are under suspicion.

== Case ==
Poupart, a mother of two, was last seen on May 20, 1990, with two men after leaving a party in Lac du Flambeau, Wisconsin, at 4:00 AM. According to one witness, she was being forced into a vehicle. Six months after she went missing, on November 22, 1990, hunters discovered her remains in the Chequamegon-Nicolet National Forest.

After testifying in court, both men, whom she had last seen, denied abducting her, claiming that they were going to transport the woman home, but instead dropped her off near a school. On November 22, 1990, her purse and identification were discovered underneath harvested trees. Her partial remains were subsequently found; she had been sexually assaulted. Duct tape and plastic were also found, indicating that her killer or killers had attempted to hide the corpse.

== Later developments ==
In 2007, a man was given several hearings in court after being accused of involvement in Susan Poupart's death. However, the charges were later dismissed after witnesses declined to appear, although several others reportedly testified. The two men seen with Poupart after the party are considered persons of interest, along with the other man. Interviews about the case continued to be conducted between the three, but the men have given little to assist authorities.

In 2014, evidence was tested for DNA after advances in technology, but it did not unearth any new clues. Suspicion has continued to circulate through the local area about those who may be responsible for the murder. However, it is believed that most individuals have withheld their knowledge "out of fear."

A billboard along Highway 47 detailing the case was created, in hopes of receiving tips on the case, with some success. Investigators reported that they had received information about the case as late as 2016, which somewhat helped the case.

== See also ==
- List of homicides in Wisconsin
- Lists of solved missing person cases
- List of unsolved murders (1980–1999)
- Sexual victimization of Native American women
- Missing and Murdered Indigenous Women
- Murder of Shirley Soosay, an Indigenous Canadian woman identified several decades after her rape and murder
