= Amanda Park, Washington =

- Census-designated place
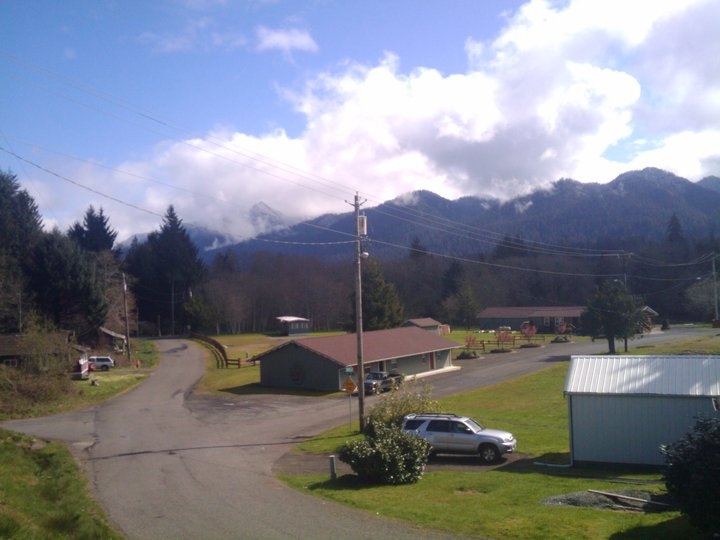
- View of Amanda Park

- Location within Washington (state) Location within the United States
- Coordinates: 47°27′14″N 123°54′05″W
- Country: United States
- State: Washington
- County: Grays Harbor

Area
  - Total: 8.5 sq mi (22.0 km^{2})
  - Land: 8.2 sq mi (21.3 km^{2})
  - Water: 0.27 sq mi (0.7 km^{2})
- Elevation: 367 ft (112 m)

Population (2020)
  - Total: 162
  - Density: 19.7/sq mi (7.61/km^{2})
- Time zone: UTC-8 (Pacific (PST))
  - Summer (DST): UTC-7 (PDT)
- ZIP Code: 98526
- FIPS code: 53-01780
- GNIS feature ID: 2584944

Amanda Park is a census designated place on the Olympic Peninsula in Grays Harbor County, Washington, United States, along U.S. Route 101. Olympic National Park and Lake Quinault are directly to the north. As of the 2020 census, Amanda Park had a population of 162.

== Geography ==
The community is near the northern border of Grays Harbor County, on the Quinault River at the outlet of Lake Quinault. It is in the northeast corner of the Quinault Indian Nation. U.S. 101 passes through the center of the community, leading northwest 25 miles (40 km) to Queets on the Pacific coast and south 43 miles (69 km) to Aberdeen. The Quinault Valley entrance to Olympic National Park is accessible from North Shore Road, which leaves US 101 at the northern edge of the CDP.

According to the U.S. Census Bureau, the Amanda Park CDP has a total area of 8.5 square miles (22.0 km^{2}), of which 8.2 square miles (21.3 km^{2}) are land and 0.3 square miles (0.7 km^{2}), or 3.24%, are water.

== Climate ==
With an average annual precipitation of 129.28 inches (3,284 mm), Amanda Park is one of the rainiest locations in Washington state. Despite heavy annual precipitation due to strong influence from the nearby Pacific, Amanda Park's climate still has a significant drying trend in July to classify it as a warm-summer Mediterranean climate (Köppen Csb).

Climate data for Amanda Park
Month	Jan	Feb	Mar	Apr	May	Jun	Jul	Aug	Sep	Oct	Nov	Dec	Year
Record high °F (°C)	63 (17)	70 (21)	74 (23)	78 (26)	95 (35)	93 (34)	102 (39)	99 (37)	93 (34)	80 (27)	70 (21)	65 (18)	102 (39)
Mean daily maximum °F (°C)	45.8 (7.7)	50.6 (10.3)	51.4 (10.8)	58.1 (14.5)	64.7 (18.2)	71.1 (21.7)	77.7 (25.4)	74.4 (23.6)	70.7 (21.5)	60.8 (16.0)	50.2 (10.1)	47.3 (8.5)	60.2 (15.7)
Mean daily minimum °F (°C)	34.6 (1.4)	37.5 (3.1)	35.5 (1.9)	39.4 (4.1)	42.8 (6.0)	47.3 (8.5)	49.2 (9.6)	49.9 (9.9)	48 (9)	43.6 (6.4)	37.1 (2.8)	36.2 (2.3)	41.8 (5.4)
Record low °F (°C)	−14 (−26)	21 (−6)	24 (−4)	30 (−1)	33 (1)	37 (3)	38 (3)	41 (5)	35 (2)	30 (−1)	22 (−6)	24 (−4)	14 (−10)
Average precipitation inches (mm)	18.23 (463)	16.43 (417)	12.07 (307)	11.56 (294)	6.32 (161)	3.34 (85)	0.81 (21)	3.38 (86)	5.67 (144)	12.17 (309)	20.06 (510)	19.23 (488)	129.28 (3,284)
Average snowfall inches (cm)	0 (0)	0 (0)	0.2 (0.51)	0 (0)	0 (0)	0 (0)	0 (0)	0 (0)	0 (0)	0 (0)	0 (0)	0 (0)	0.2 (0.51)
Average precipitation days (≥ 0.01 inch)	19	21	22	19	15	10	5	9	10	16	18	22	186

== Demographics ==
Historical population
Census	Pop.	Note	%±
2010	252		—
2020	162		−35.7%
U.S. Decennial Census; 2000 2010

Amanda Park was first listed as a census designated place in the 2010 U.S. census.

=== Racial and ethnic composition ===
Amanda Park CDP, Washington – Racial and ethnic composition Note: the US Census treats Hispanic/Latino as an ethnic category. This table excludes Latinos from the racial categories and assigns them to a separate category. Hispanics/Latinos may be of any race.
Race / Ethnicity (NH = Non-Hispanic)	Pop 2010	Pop 2020	% 2010	% 2020
White alone (NH)	108	62	42.86%	38.27%
Black or African American alone (NH)	0	1	0.00%	0.62%
Native American or Alaska Native alone (NH)	48	24	19.05%	14.81%
Asian alone (NH)	5	2	1.98%	1.23%
Native Hawaiian or Pacific Islander alone (NH)	0	0	0.00%	0.00%
Other race alone (NH)	0	0	0.00%	0.00%
Mixed race or Multiracial (NH)	12	20	4.76%	12.35%
Hispanic or Latino (any race)	79	53	31.35%	32.72%
Total	252	162	100.00%	100.00%

== Education ==
Almost all of its area is in the Lake Quinault School District.
