= Ghosting (identity theft) =

Stealing the identity of a deceased person

Ghosting is a form of identity theft in which someone steals the identity, and sometimes even the role within society, of a specific dead person (the "ghost") whose death is not widely known. Usually, the person who steals this identity (the "ghoster") is roughly the same age that the ghost would have been if still alive, so that any documents citing the birthdate of the ghost will not be conspicuously incorrect if appropriated by the thief now claiming to be that person.

The use of counterfeit identification falsely documenting a completely fictional identity is not ghosting, as false identification cannot be used to obtain social services or interact with government agencies or law enforcement officials. The purpose of ghosting is to enable the ghoster to appropriate an existing identity that is already listed in government records—an identity that is dormant because its original possessor is dead.

== Famous examples ==
The American film actor Wallace Ford was a successful ghoster. Born in England under the name Samuel Jones, he was estranged from his family at an early age and placed in a school in Canada. At the age of 15, Jones became a hobo and stowed away aboard freight trains with a fellow hobo named Wallace Ford. The two boys eventually were in a train accident; Jones survived, but Ford was killed. Jones then appropriated the other man's name and some aspects of his biography, becoming a successful actor under the name Wallace Ford, eventually starring on Broadway and in Hollywood films. As "Wallace Ford", Jones used the real Ford's birthdate and other statistics on all of his own tax returns and official documents, even applying for a passport as Wallace Ford for his 1937 return to England. Only shortly before his death in 1966 did the actor reveal the complete truth about his identity.

Dashiell Hammett's novel The Maltese Falcon (1930) recounts the story, apparently based on a true case, of a businessman named Flitcraft who spontaneously abandons his career and his marriage, abruptly moving to another city and inventing another identity. If this incident did indeed occur in the 1920s or earlier, Flitcraft would have encountered little difficulty in establishing a new life without formal documents such as a birth certificate and Social Security number. If this had occurred ten years later, Flitcraft would have needed a ghost identity to begin his new life.
