= Hordaland Police District =

Agency overview
- Formed: 2002
- Dissolved: 2017
- Employees: Approx. 900

Jurisdictional structure
- Operations jurisdiction: Hordaland, County, Norway
- General nature: Local civilian police

Operational structure
- Overseen by: National Police Directorate
- Headquarters: Bergen Sentrum Police Station, Alehelgens gate 6, Bergen
- Agency executive: Geir Gudmundsen, Chief of Police

Facilities
- Politistasjon / Lensmannskontors: 15

Website
- https://www.politi.no/hordaland

Hordaland Police District (Norwegian: Hordaland politidisrikt) was a police district for the old Hordaland county in Norway. It was headquartered in the city of Bergen. The police district covered an area with approximately 454,000 inhabitants. It was dissolved in 2017 and it became part of the West Police District.

== Jurisdiction ==
The police district covered the municipalities of Askøy, Austevoll, Austrheim, Bergen, Eidfjord, Fedje, Fjell, Fusa, Granvin, Gulen, Jondal, Kvam, Kvinnherad, Lindås, Masfjorden, Meland, Modalen, Odda, Os, Osterøy, Radøy, Samnanger, Sund, Tysnes, Ullensvang, Ulvik, Vaksdal, Voss and Øygarden, all of which were in Hordaland county except for Gulen Municipality which was in Sogn og Fjordane county.

It was the second largest police district in Norway, after Oslo. There were four police stations in the city of Bergen (north, south, west and central Bergen) and eleven sheriff's offices (Norwegian: lensmannskontor) spread around the other parts of the county.

== See also ==
- Norwegian Police Service
