= Lyle Stevik =

Formerly unidentified decedent (died 2001)

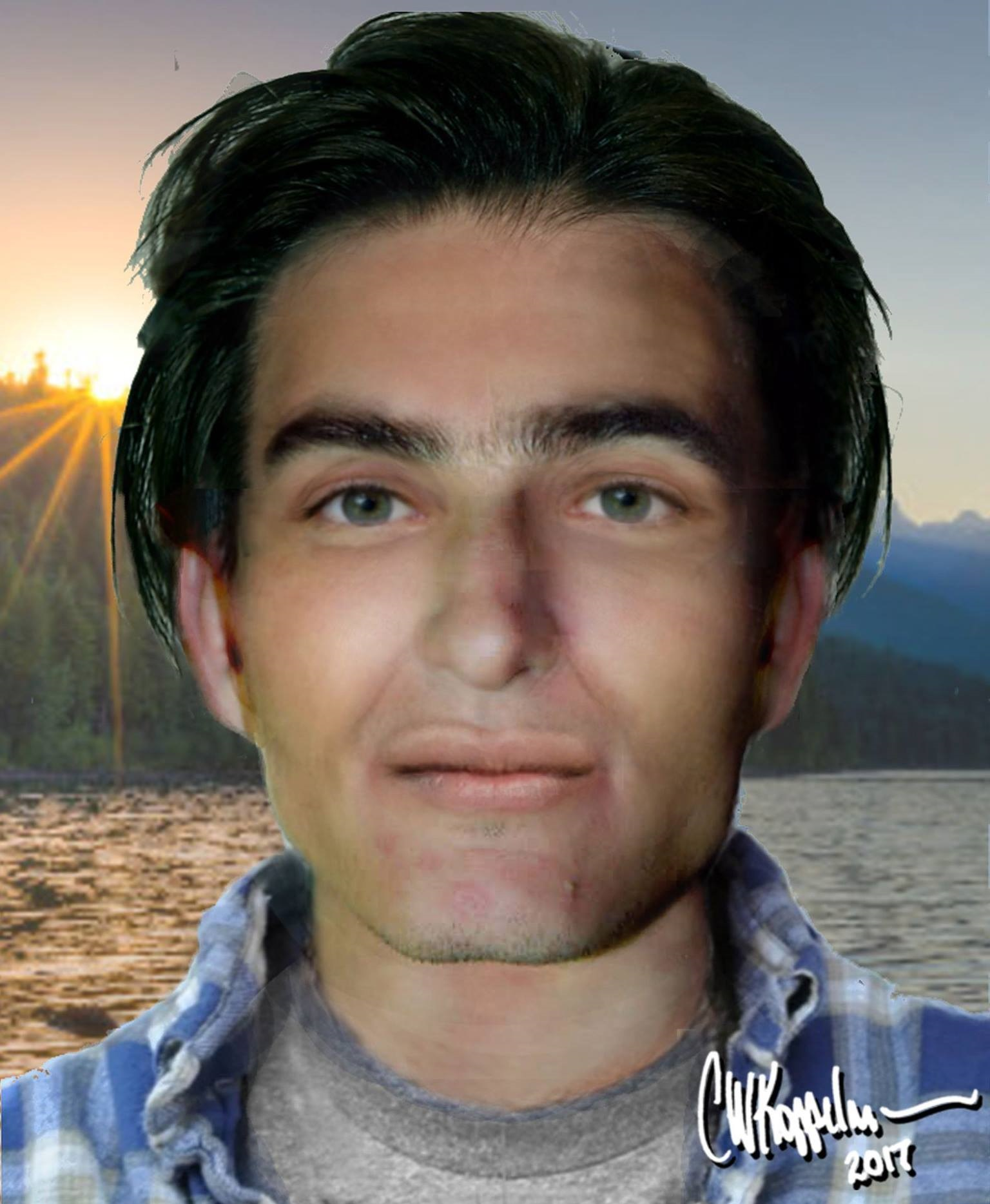
- Facial reconstruction
- Born: Alameda County, California, U.S.
- Status: Identified on May 8, 2018
- Died: September 16, 2001 (aged 25); Amanda Park, Washington, U.S.
- Cause of death: Suicide by hanging
- Body discovered: September 16, 2001
- Resting place: Fern Hill Cemetery, Aberdeen, Washington, U.S. (until May 2018)
- Known for: Former unidentified decedent
- Height: 5 ft 10 in (1.78 m) - 6 ft 2 in (1.88 m)

Lyle Stevik was the alias used by an American man who, on September 16, 2001, died by suicide inside a motel room in Amanda Park, Washington. Although his body was quickly discovered, and fingerprints, DNA and dental information collected and recorded, there were no matches in any databases and the man's identity remained unknown until 2018.

On May 8, 2018, the Grays Harbor County Sheriff's Office announced that "Stevik" had been identified after almost 17 years, with assistance from genetic genealogy conducted by the DNA Doe Project, a non-profit organization dedicated to identifying unknown deceased persons. Finding a cluster of matches of relatives, perhaps two to three generations removed, in New Mexico, they were eventually able to locate members of his birth family.

The man's family had believed that he was voluntarily estranged from the family. Relatives requested that his identity be withheld publicly for privacy.

== Circumstances ==
The man who identified himself as "Lyle Stevik" checked into the Quinault Inn, a motel in Amanda Park, Washington, on Friday, September 14, 2001, after arriving in the area by bus. The clerk told police that he may have been Canadian as he spoke with what seemed a similar accent. When registering for his room, he entered his alias and provided a false home address, eventually discovered to belong to a Best Western hotel in Meridian, Idaho. The police located that hotel, but none of the staff members recognized photos of the deceased.

Stevik was reportedly seen walking back and forth at the side of a highway near the Quinault Inn, but it is uncertain if this was before or after he registered and paid for his room. He requested and received a second room after complaining about outside noise.

Stevik may have derived his name from that of "Lyle Stevick", a character from the novel You Must Remember This (1987), written by Joyce Carol Oates. In the story, the character Stevick contemplates suicide.

Located by techniques of genetic genealogy performed by staff and volunteers of the DNA Doe Project in 2018, the man's family had been unaware of his suicide. They believed that he was living a life elsewhere and did not want to speak to them. Due to the estrangement, they had not filed a missing person report. There was no report that appeared to match the decedent.

== Death ==
Stevik hanged himself by his belt from a bar inside a clothes closet. He had left money in the room to cover the remaining two nights of the weekend, together with a note simply reading "suicide". He is thought to have died on Sunday, September 16. His body was found the following day. Initial reports stated that Stevik had stayed at the motel for two nights, but his actual arrival date was Friday, September 14, indicating that he had been registered at the hotel for three nights. He paid at the desk for one night's lodging, but said that he planned to stay for "a few more days".

Upon discovery of the body, police reported that Stevik had closed the blinds in the room and lined the closet in which he hanged himself with pillows. He left a note saying "for the room" at the bedside table, which contained $160 in $20 bills. It has been speculated that Stevik may have taken his own life due to depression or because of a fatal disease, although the autopsy showed no signs of the latter. It was also theorized that the man was native to a non-English speaking country. An investigator said that a piece of paper was located in a trash bin with the word "suicide" written on it, as if he were practicing.

Stevik had no luggage with him; only a toothbrush and toothpaste were found in the room. He wore a blue shirt in a plaid design, a gray T-shirt underneath, blue jeans and black boots.

== Postmortem examination ==
Stevik was described as fair-skinned with black hair and green/hazel eyes. The local coroner's office said that he may have also had African-American ancestry, in addition to Native American and Hispanic. DNA analysis concluded he was at least one-quarter Native American and one-quarter Hispanic or Spanish. His teeth showed evidence of earlier treatment with braces. He had an old appendectomy scar. A mole was noted on his chin and he had attached earlobes, a genetic characteristic.

The examination also showed that Stevik had recently lost a large amount of weight, up to 40 pounds (18 kg). The coroner estimated this weight difference after noting that the size of the man's jeans was fairly large in comparison to his body. His age was estimated to be between 20 and 30 years old, giving an estimated birth date from 1971 to 1981. It was also estimated that he might have been around 35 years old, however, so his birth could have been as early as 1966.

The man known as Stevik was later buried in an unmarked grave at the Fern Hill Cemetery in Aberdeen, Washington.

== Investigation ==
Because Stevik was deceased for only a short time before his body was found, examiners readily obtained his fingerprints, dental characteristics and DNA. These identifying markers were placed in international databases, including CODIS, but no matches were made. It is believed that he came to the area from Aberdeen or Port Angeles, locations from which buses daily traveled to Amanda Park. He was not, however, recognized by either of the bus drivers. Two men who were missing at the time, Alexander Craig and Steven Needham, were ruled out as possible identities of Stevik.

In April 2007, Stevik was listed as the profile of the month for Missing from the Circle, a public service initiative launched by Lamar Associates, a law enforcement advisory organization based in Washington, D.C., to help solve cases involving missing or unidentified Native Americans.

== Identification ==
In 2018, two genetic genealogists from the DNA Doe Project, Colleen M. Fitzpatrick and Margaret Press, uploaded DNA profiles to GEDmatch in an attempt to link Stevik to individuals living in Idaho and New Mexico.

The Grays Harbor County Sheriff's Office announced on May 8, 2018, that Stevik had been identified through DNA analysis and comparison with genetic relatives, performed by the DNA Doe Project, in collaboration with Aerodyne and Full Genomes Corporation. The Grays Harbor County Sheriff's Office notified the man's family, who had believed him to be alive and had thought he had estranged himself from his family. The decedent's family had a set of his fingerprints that were taken in grade school, as part of a children's identification program. The Sheriff's Department compared those with the postmortem prints taken in 2001 and made a positive identification. To protect his privacy as well as theirs, his family has chosen not to identify Stevik publicly.

== See also ==
- Mary Anderson, who died by suicide in a Washington motel under a pseudonym in 1996. As of 2026, she is still unidentified.
- Peter Bergmann, who died after staying in an Irish hotel under a pseudonym in 2009. As of 2026, he is still unidentified.
- Murder of Shirley Soosay, an indigenous Canadian woman who was also identified by the DNA Doe Project.
