= Footstep =

Footstep(s) may refer to:

== Film ==
- Footsteps (1974 film), a short film by Alan Parker
- Footsteps (1982 film), a Canadian short drama film
- Footsteps (2003 film), an American television thriller directed by John Badham
- Footsteps, a 2006 British film directed by Gareth Evans
- Footsteps, a 2010 film starring Marshall Bell

== Literature ==
- Footsteps (autobiography), a 1985 book by Richard Holmes
- Footsteps (novel), a 1985 novel by Pramoedya Ananta Toer
- Footsteps, a pull-out section in Living History Magazine

== Music ==
=== Albums ===
- Footsteps (album), by Chris de Burgh, or the title song, 2009
- Footsteps, by Buckethead, 2014

=== Songs ===
- "Footsteps" (Pop Evil song), 2015
- "Footsteps" (Ri Jong-o song), a North Korean propaganda song, 2009
- "Footsteps" (Steve Lawrence song), 1960
- "Footsteps", by Alison Moyet from Hoodoo, 1990
- "Footsteps", by Dardanelles from Mirror Mirror, 2007
- "Footsteps", by the Motels from Little Robbers, 1983
- "Footsteps", by Olly Murs from You Know I Know, 2018
- "Footsteps", by Pearl Jam from the B-side of the single "Jeremy", 1992
- "Footsteps", by Pet Shop Boys from Nightlife, 1999
- "Footsteps", by Stiltskin from The Mind's Eye, 1994

== Other uses ==
- Footsteps (organization), a support organization for people who have left or want to leave a Haredi or Hasidic Jewish community

== See also ==
- Footfall, a 1985 novel by Larry Niven and Jerry Pournelle
- Footprint (disambiguation)
