= Footprint (disambiguation) =

A footprint is an impression left by a foot or shoe.

Foot print, footprint or footprints may also refer to:

== Arts, entertainment, and media ==
=== Literature ===
- "Footprints" (poem), a popular allegorical poem and poster
- Footprints on Sand, 1981 collection by authors L. Sprague de Camp and Catherine Crook de Camp

=== Music ===
==== Albums ====
- Footprint (album), by Gary Wright
- Footprints (Holly Valance album), 2002
- Footprints (Duncan Mighty album), 2013
- Footprints (Pat Martino album)
- Footprints (Tuks Senganga album)
- Footprints, an album by Karrin Allyson

==== Songs and compositions ====
- "Footprints" (composition), a jazz standard by Wayne Shorter
- Footprints (Paul McCartney song)
- Footprints (Róisín Murphy song)
- "Foot Prints", a song by Yes from the album Keys to Ascension 2
- "Footprints", a song by G-Unit from the album Beg for Mercy
- "Footprints", a song by Half Man Half Biscuit on the 1993 album This Leaden Pall
- "Footprints", a song from Sia Furler's 2016 album This Is Acting
- "Footprints", a song from Squeeze's 1987 album Babylon and On
- "Footprints", a song from Tom Gregory's 2021 album Things I Can't Say Out Loud
- "Footprints", a song by A Tribe Called Quest from the album People's Instinctive Travels and the Paths of Rhythm

=== Other uses in arts, entertainment, and media ===
- Footprint Center, sports and entertainment arena in Phoenix, Arizona, US
- Footprint Films (Australia), Australian film distributor
- Footprint Films (UK), British film production company, producer of Escape from Pretoria
- Footprints (2011 film), an American drama film
- Footprints (2015 film), a Canadian documentary film
- "Footprints" (Slow Horses), a TV episode

== Organizations ==
- Citizens' Footprint Movement, political party in Colombia
- Footprint Books, a travel publisher based in Bath, UK, that covers Latin America
- Footprint (company), a company based in Gilbert, Arizona, US, that makes biodegradable packaging materials

== Science and technology ==
- Carbon footprint, the carbon dioxide released by a human activity into the atmosphere
- Digital footprint, or digital shadow, one's unique set of traceable digital activities on the Internet or digital devices
- Ecological footprint, the environmental impact of a human activity, machine, etc.
- Footprint (electronics), the layout of electronic connections on a printed circuit board
- Footprint (satellite), the area of the Earth's surface from which a satellite's signals can be received
- Footprinting, the technique of gathering information about computer systems
- Memory footprint, the amount of memory a computer program uses

== Other uses ==
- Footprint (tent), groundsheet protector
- Footprint Nebula, a protoplanetary nebula also known as M1-92

== See also ==
- Buddha footprint, an early aniconic and symbolic representation of the Buddha
- Devil's Footprints, mysterious footprints in snow in Devon, England in 1855
- First Footprints, a 2013 Australian documentary TV series
- Fossil track, a fossilized footprint
  - Laetoli footprints, prehistoric footprints near Laetoli, Tanzania
- Moso's Footprint, formation in Samoa
