= Footprint =

Impressions or images left behind by a person walking or running

Buzz Aldrin's bootprint on the Moon in 1969 on the Apollo 11 mission

Footprints are the impressions or images left behind by a person walking or running. Hoofprints and pawprints are those left by animals with hooves or paws rather than feet, while "shoeprints" is the specific term for prints made by shoes. They may either be indentations in the ground or something placed onto the surface that was stuck to the bottom of the foot. A "trackway" is a set of footprints in soft earth left by a life-form; animal tracks are the footprints, hoofprints, or pawprints of an animal.

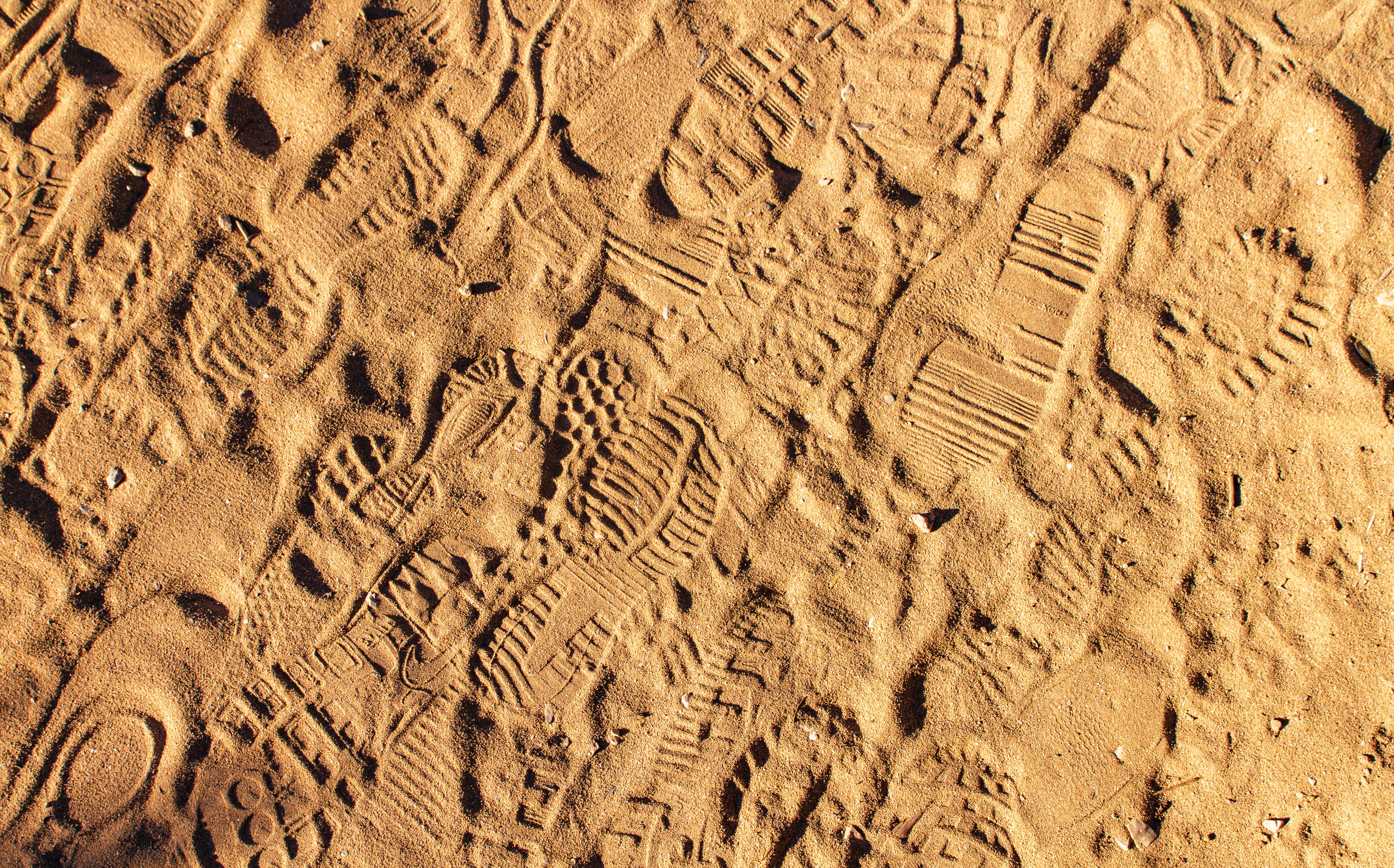
A photo of diverse shoeprints on a beach

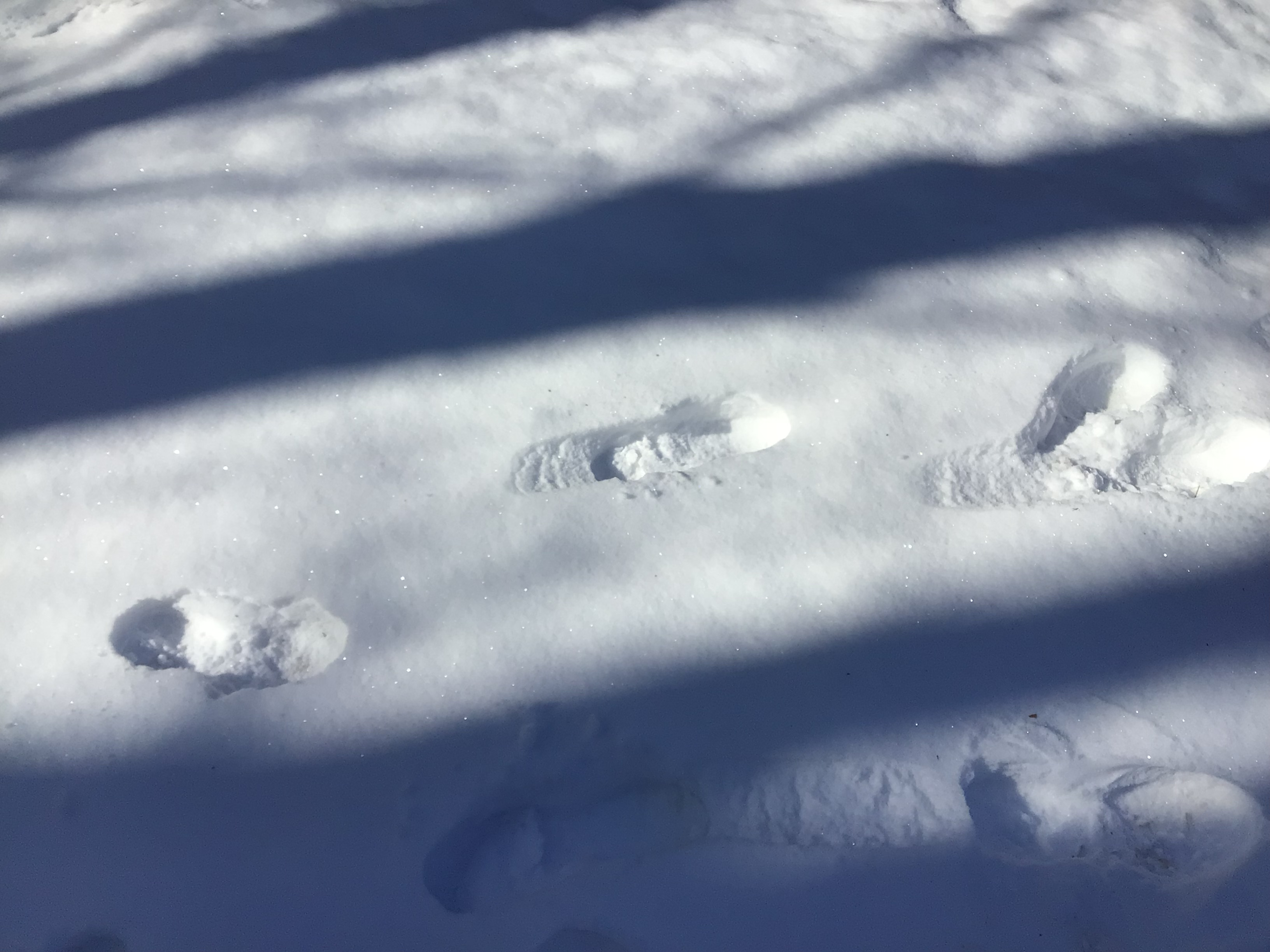
Footprints left in snow

Footprints can be followed when tracking during a hunt or can provide evidence of activities. Some footprints remain unexplained, with several famous stories from mythology and legend. Others have provided evidence of prehistoric life and behaviours.

== Footprints in detective work ==
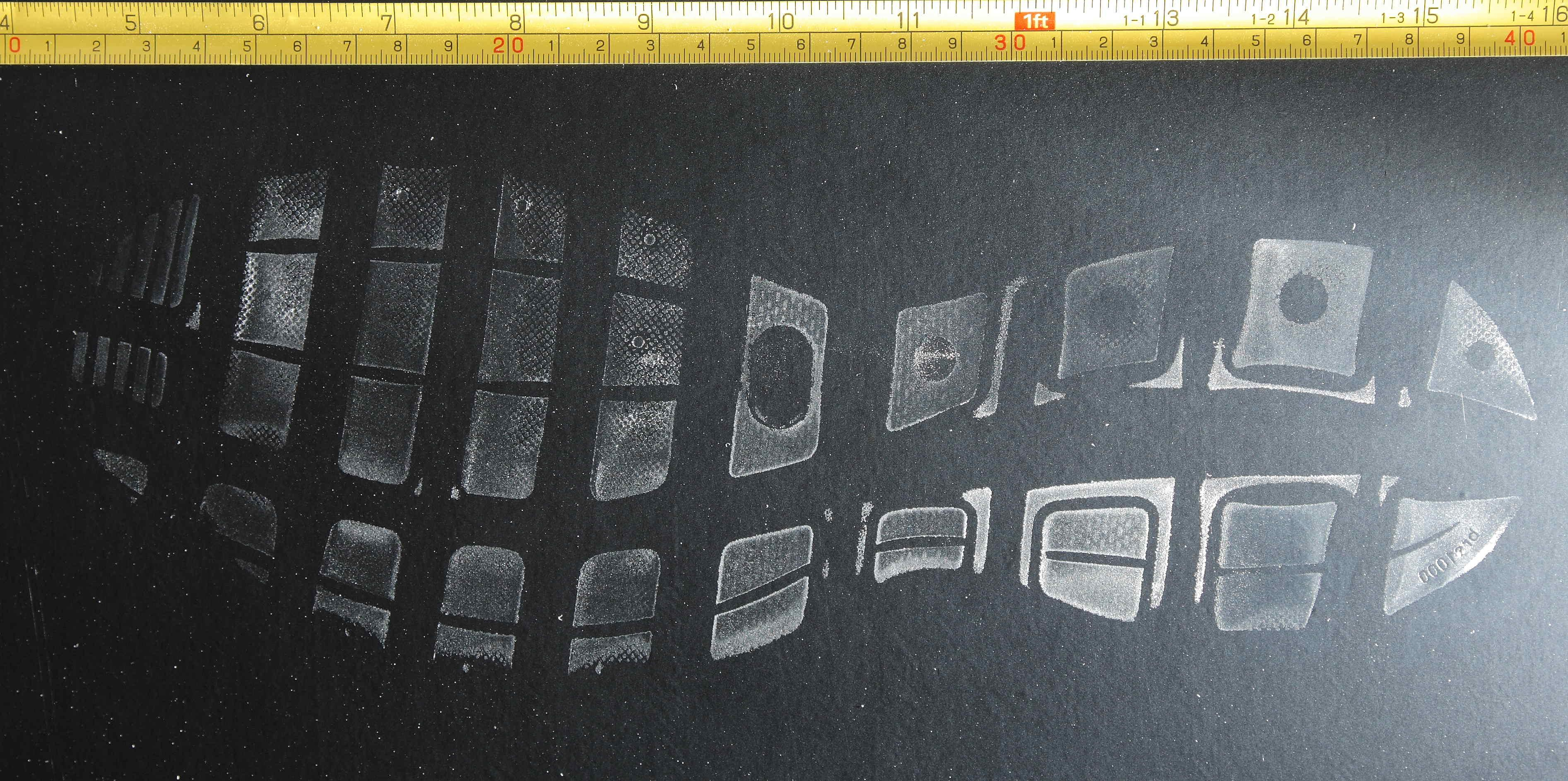
Shoeprint left at crime scene

The print left behind at a crime scene can give vital evidence to the perpetrator of the crime. Shoes have many different prints based on the sole design and the wear that it has received – this can help to identify suspects. Photographs or castings of footprints can be taken to preserve the finding. Analysis of footprints and shoeprints is a specialist part of forensic science.

Some detective work is relatively immediate, with criminals being tracked by the footprints they left in the snow leading from the crime scene to their home or hiding place. This is usually reported as a humorous story in news publications.

Footprints or shoeprints can also allow the detective to find approximate heights. The foot tends to be approximately 15% of the person's average height. Individualistic characteristics of the footprints like numerous creases, flatfoot character, horizontal and vertical ridges, corns, deformities etc. can help the forensic scientist in cases pertaining to criminal identification. In some forensic cases, the need may also arise to estimate body weight from the size of the footprints.

Footprints have been shown to have determined the height and the sex of the individual.

=== Ridge patterns ===
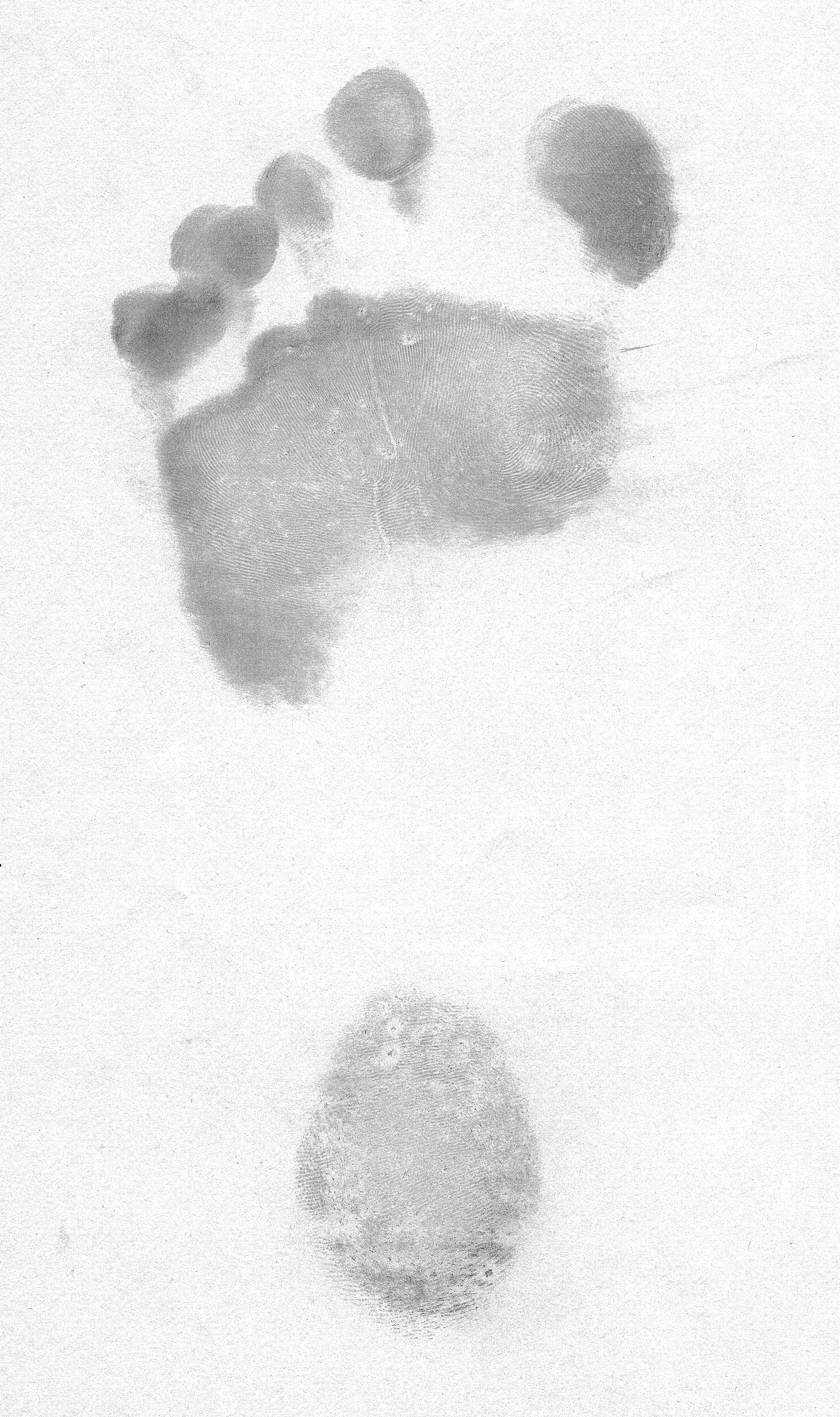
Footprint of a human with pes cavus

Friction ridge skin present on the soles of the feet and toes (plantar surfaces) is as unique in its ridge detail as are the fingers and palms (palmar surfaces). When recovered at crime scenes or on items of evidence, sole and toe impressions can be used in the same manner as finger and palm prints to effect identifications. Footprint (toe and sole friction ridge skin) evidence has been admitted in courts in the United States since 1934.

The footprints of infants, along with the thumb or index finger prints of mothers, are still commonly recorded in hospitals to assist in verifying the identity of infants. Often, the only identifiable ridge detail that can be seen on a baby's foot is from the large toe or adjacent to the large toe.

It is not uncommon for military records of flight personnel to include bare foot inked impressions. Friction ridge skin protected inside flight boots tends to survive the trauma of a plane crash (and accompanying fire) better than fingers. Even though the US Armed Forces DNA Identification Laboratory (AFDIL), as of 2010, stored refrigerated DNA samples from all active duty and reserve personnel, almost all casualty identifications are effected using fingerprints from military ID card records (live scan fingerprints are recorded at the time such cards are issued). When friction ridge skin is not available from military personnel's remains, DNA and dental records are used to confirm identity.

== Ancient footprints ==
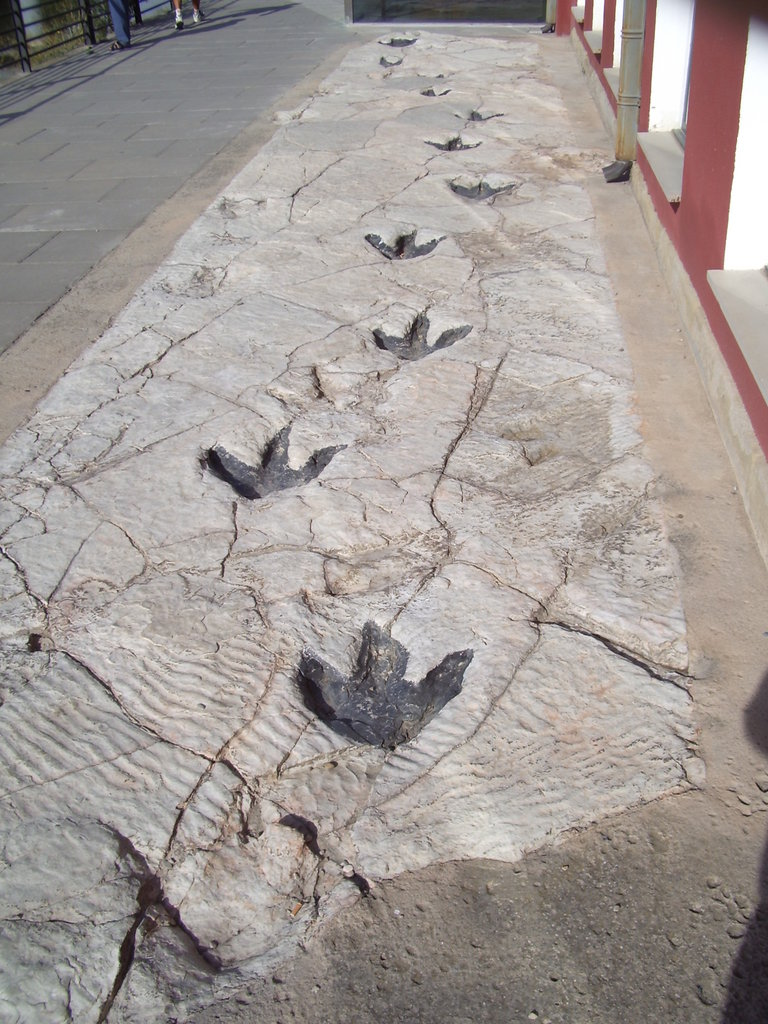
Replica of dinosaur footprints found in La Rioja

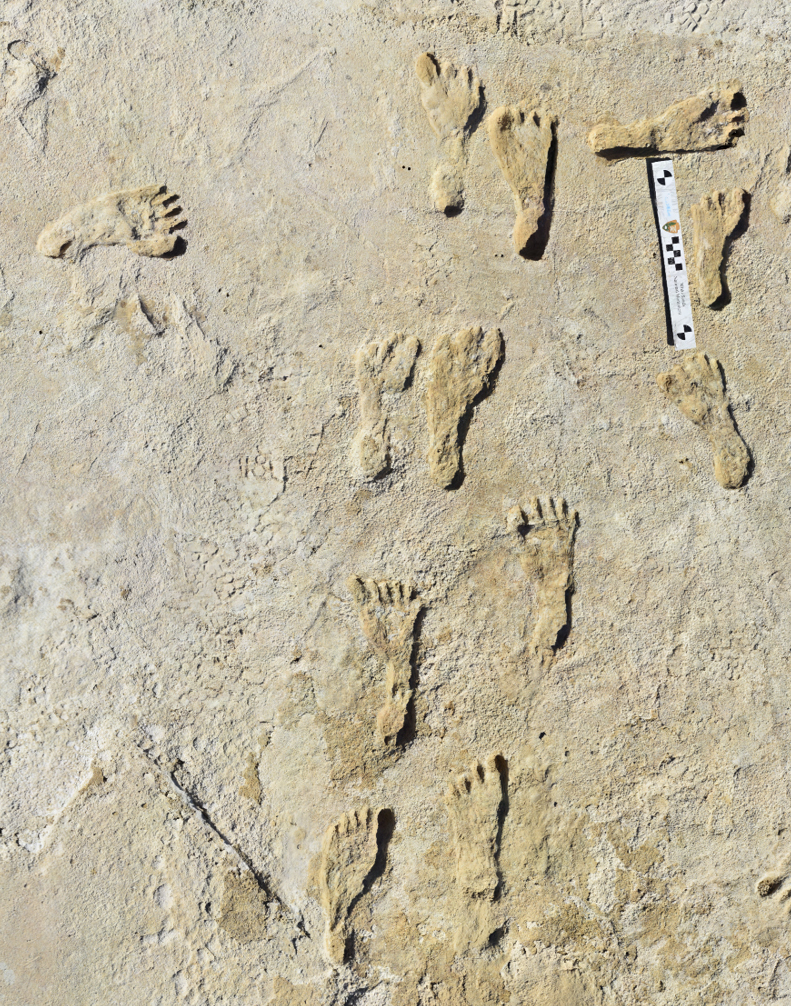
Footprints from White Sands National Park

Footprints have been preserved as fossils and provide evidence of prehistoric life. Known as "ichnites", these trace fossils can give clues to the behaviour of specific species of dinosaur. The study of such fossils is known as ichnology and the footprints may be given scientific names (ichnospecies). Grallator is one example of an ichnogenus based on ichnites. Strictly speaking, an ichnospecies is the name of the trace fossil, not of the animal that made it.

An international team's discovery of a set of 1.5 million-year-old human ancestor footprints in Ileret, Kenya provides the earliest direct evidence of a modern human style of upright walking. The team believe that the prints were probably formed by the species Homo erectus.

Footprints suggesting the first making of shoes or sandals due to having crisp edges, no signs of toes found and three small divots where leather tying laces/straps would have been attached have been in South Africa dating back to between 73,000 and 136,000 PB.

Further, in September 2021, scientists reported the discovery of human footprints in White Sands National Park in the state of New Mexico that are understood to be 23,000 years old, around the time of the last Ice Age. Later studies, reported in October 2023, confirmed that the age of the human footprints to be "up to 23,000 years old".

=== Other footprint findings ===
- Lark Quarry Dinosaur Trackways, the only known palaeontological record of a dinosaur stampede
- Trachilos footprints – hominin-like footprints from the Miocene era (5.7 million years ago) discovered in Crete.
- Laetoli – human footprints from the Pliocene era (3.7 million years ago) preserved in volcanic ash
- Siwa Oasis in Egypt – hominid footprint over 3 million years old
- Koobi Fora – 1.5 million-year-old hominin footprints in Kenya showing essentially modern bipedal locomotion
- The Ciampate del Diavolo in Italy are a series of hominid footprints in solidified ash from the eruption of a volcano 345,000 years ago
- Acahualinca – 2,100-year-old human footprints fossilized in volcanic ash and mud in Nicaragua
- Uskmouth – human footprints carbon dated to 4200 BC preserved in clay
- Hawaii Volcanoes National Park – Footprint impressions found in the Ka’u Desert ash within Hawaii Volcanoes National Park
- Footprints of Eve – the oldest known footprints of an anatomically modern human
- 1790 Footprints – a set of footprints on the island of Hawaii
- Happisburgh footprints – footprints of about five adult and children members of Homo antecessor dating to more than 800,000 years before present, found at Happisburgh in England
- Pilauco footprint, the oldest footprint found in the Americas
- Paluxy dinosaur trackways and footprints in the Paluxy riverbed.

== Footprints in myth and legend ==
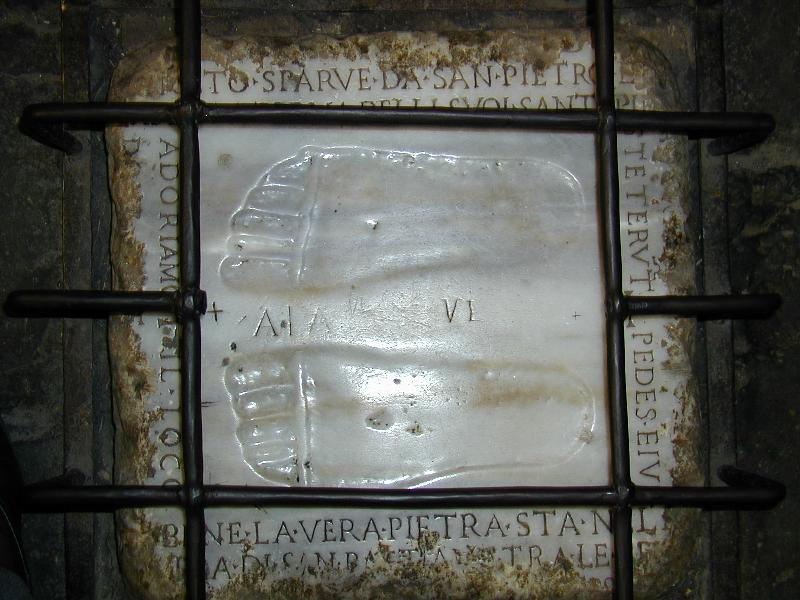
One legend states that these impressions, kept in the Church of Domine Quo Vadis, are the footprints of Jesus.

The appearance of footprints, or marks interpreted as footprints, have led to numerous myths and legends. Some locations use such imprints as tourist attractions.

Détailed article Petrosomatoglyph

Examples of footprints in myth and legend include:

- Buddha footprint – an aniconic and symbolic representation of the Buddha.
- The Devil's Footprints – an unexplained series of hoof-like marks that appeared in Devon, England on 8 February 1855 after a light snowfall during the night.
- Golden calf – in Islam dust from the hoofprints of Haizum, the winged horse of archangel Gabriel, is used to animate the Golden calf.
- Moso's Footprint – a 1m by 3m rock enclosure in Samoa made when the giant Moso stepped over to Samoa from Fiji, and the other footprint can be found on Viti Levu, the largest island of Fiji.
- Footprints of Bigfoot, a cryptozoological animal, are said to give proof to its existence.
- Sri Pada, or Adam's Peak, a mountain in Sri Lanka, has a large footprint-shaped impression in the rock at its summit, said by various religious adherents to be that of the Buddha, Shiva or Adam.
- The reputed print of the right foot of Jesus is preserved in the Mosque of the Ascension in Jerusalem.
- A set of Jesus's footprints, according to legend, are preserved at the Church of Domine Quo Vadis outside of Rome.
- A mark in stone of the paving of the Munich Frauenkirche is known as the Teufelstritt ("Devil's Footstep").

== Footprints in popular culture ==
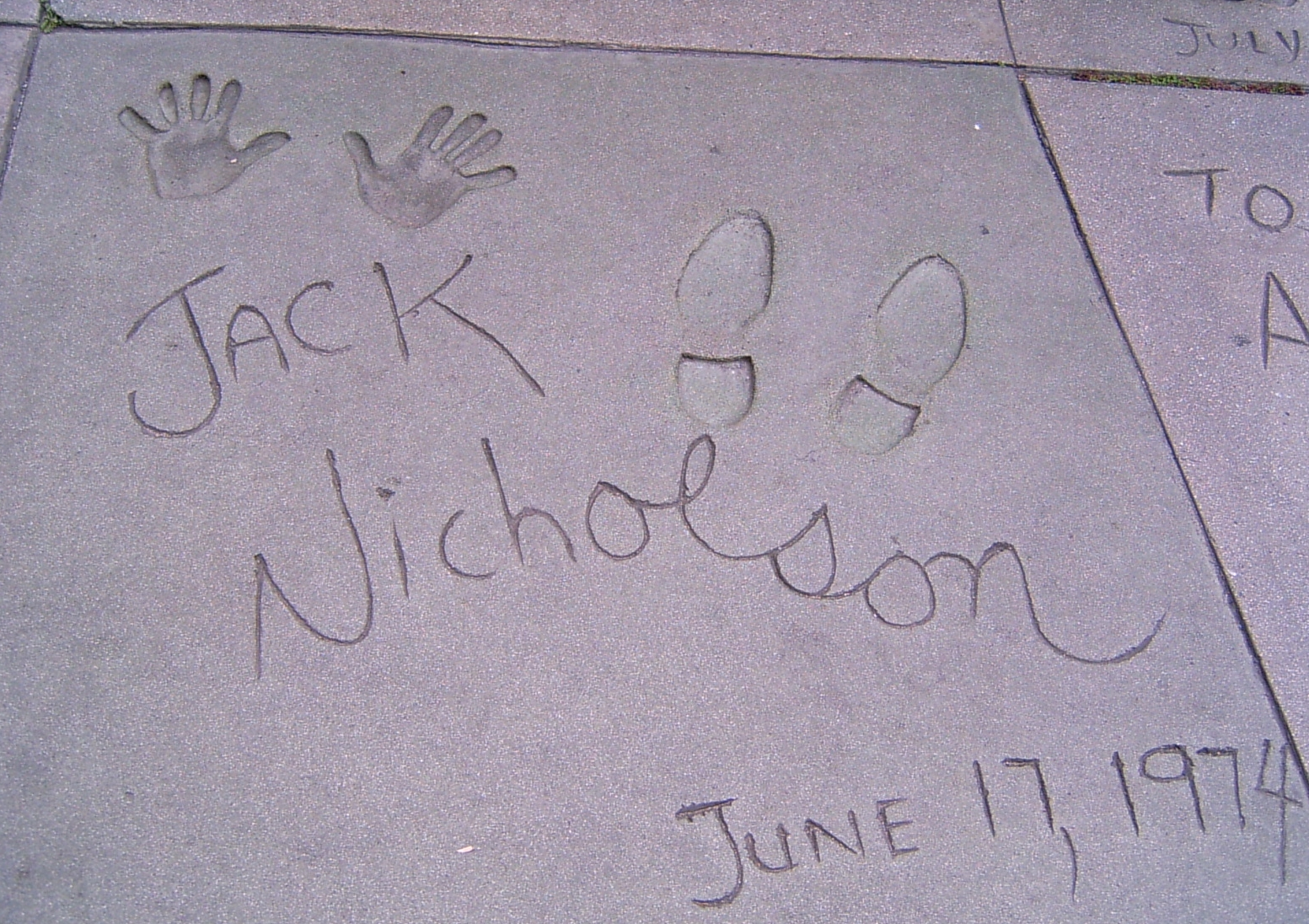
Jack Nicholson's shoe and handprints outside Grauman's Chinese Theatre

The imagery of footprints has been used in many areas of popular culture. Several poems and songs have been written about them, with the Christian poem Footprints being one of the best known.

Prints or impressions of a child's feet can be kept as a memento by parents. Usually this is done using paint. The impressions of celebrity's feet, usually in concrete, may be kept in a collection such as that outside Grauman's Chinese Theatre.

== See also ==
- Ecological footprint
- Fingerprint
- Footstep
- Petrosomatoglyph
- Pugmark
- Digital footprint
