= The Age of Wonder =

2008 history book by Richard Holmes

- Hardcover edition
- Author: Richard Holmes
- Language: English
- Subject: History of Science
- Genre: Non-fiction
- Publisher: HarperCollins
- Publication date: 2008
- Publication place: United States
- Media type: Print, e-book
- Pages: 554 pp
- ISBN: 978-0-00-714952-0

The Age of Wonder: How the Romantic Generation Discovered the Beauty and Terror of Science is a 2008 popular biography book about the history of science written by Richard Holmes. In it, the author describes the scientific discoveries of the polymaths of the late eighteenth century and how this period formed the basis for modern scientific discoveries. Holmes, a literary biographer, also looks at the influence of science on the arts in the Romantic era. The book won the 2009 Royal Society Prize for Science Books, the 2009 National Book Critics Circle Award for General Nonfiction, and the 2010 National Academies Communication Award.

== Overview ==
Holmes focuses particularly on the lives and works of Sir Joseph Banks, the astronomers William and Caroline Herschel, and chemist Humphry Davy. Other profiles include African explorer Mungo Park. There is a chapter on the early history of ballooning including pioneers Jean-François Pilâtre de Rozier, Vincent Lunardi, Jean-Pierre Blanchard and James Sadler.

He also describes the relationships between the scientists of that time, and the early days of the Royal Society. A recurring theme of the book is the relation between science and poetry in the Romantic era. John Keats, in “On First Looking into Chapman’s Homer”, compares his first encounter with Homer’s poetry to Herschel’s discovery of Uranus: “Then felt I like some watcher of the skies/ When a new planet swims into his ken.” Holmes writes that “Among other things, Keats had combined science and poetry in a new and intensely exciting way.” (207) Keats would express negative feelings about science in “Lamia”, where he accused Newton, by “unweav[ing] the rainbow”, of reducing it “to the dull catalogue of common things.” Another Romantic poet, Samuel Taylor Coleridge, said he attended Humphry Davy’s lectures “to enlarge my stock of metaphors.” Davy, Mungo Park and the Arctic explorer William Parry are alluded to by Byron in his satiric epic Don Juan as emblems of the age.

Holmes looks at how the debates around Vitalism contributed to Mary Shelley’s Frankenstein: “Mary’s brilliance was to see that these weighty and often alarming ideas could be given highly suggestive, imaginative and even playful form... She would develop exactly what William Lawrence had dismissed in his lectures as a ‘hypothesis or fiction.’ Indeed, it was to be an utterly new form of fiction – the science fiction novel.” (327)

Holmes bookends his narrative with voyages of discovery. It opens in 1769, with Joseph Banks traveling to Tahiti on HMS Endeavour. In the last chapter, he describes John Herschel's establishment of an observatory in Cape Town to catalogue the stars of the southern hemisphere in 1833. In 1836, Herschel was visited by a young Charles Darwin, returning from the Galápagos on HMS Beagle.

The book was published by HarperCollins in 2008 in the UK, and by Pantheon in the US in 2009.

== Reception ==
The book received very good reviews, and made several Best Books of 2009 lists, including the New York Times' Ten Best list.

Mike Jay of the Daily Telegraph wrote: "Scientists, like poets, need a sense of wonder, a sense of humility and a sense of humour. Holmes has all three in abundance". Peter Forbes of The Independent wrote of the book:

"Its heart – the linked stories of Banks, Herschel and Davy – is thrilling: a portrait of bold adventure among the stars, across the oceans, deep into matter, poetry and the human psyche"

== See also ==
- Royal Society Prizes for Science Books
- Unweaving the Rainbow by Richard Dawkins, which rebuts the claims of Keats in "Lamia"
- History of science
