= History Extra =

British history magazine

HistoryExtra
- Cover of the December 2024 issue
- Editor: Rob Attar
- Categories: History
- Frequency: Monthly
- Total circulation: 97,550 (June 2016)
- First issue: May 2000
- Company: Immediate Media Company
- Country: United Kingdom
- ISSN: 1469-8552

History Extra (stylised as HistoryExtra) is a British magazine and website devoted to both British and world history, and aimed at readers of all levels of knowledge and interest. There are thirteen issues a year, one each month and a Christmas special. The magazine is published by the Immediate Media Company. HistoryExtra is the biggest-selling history magazine in the UK. Until December 2025 the magazine was titled BBC History.

The magazine contains topical features written by academic historians, as well as historical analysis of news events and comparisons with similar previous events, reviews of new books and media, and features on significant locations in history.

== History ==
The magazine was launched as BBC History in May 2000 by BBC Magazines, with Greg Neale, an experienced journalist and history graduate, as editor. In February 2004 its parent company BBC Worldwide acquired Origin Publishing, which had published the rival Living History Magazine since April 2003. Living History Magazine was then incorporated into BBC History and its former editor Dave Musgrove, a journalist with a doctorate in medieval archaeology, became editor of BBC History. Following the merger the magazine increased its sales and subscriptions.

In March 2010 BBC Historia was launched through a partnership with the Spanish publishers Ediciones Nobel. In March 2011 the Hungarian edition, retaining the English title, was launched by the Hungarian publisher Kossuth Kiadó; it features articles by Hungarian historians in addition to items translated from English. In August 2022, after a four-month hiatus, a different publisher, Kocsis Kiadó Zrt., managed by András Sándor Kocsis, formerly at Kossuth Kiadó, started to publish the magazine. A Greek edition was launched in December 2020.

From 2001 through 2012, the main BBC website also included tie-materials, in the form of historical articles and topic summaries, at BBC.co.uk/history (which was later redirected to an index of BBC's historically themed television offerings).

The magazine was renamed HistoryExtra in January 2026, ending its official relationship with the BBC.

== In the news ==
In January 2006 the magazine's list of the "ten worst Britons" was widely reported, and in April 2006 its report of a poll in which the day Magna Carta was signed was chosen as a suitable day for a celebration of "Britishness" also attracted unusual attention, to the ire of some in Scotland.

In August 2006 a feature on the "best British Prime Minister" hit the headlines.

In 2008 some newspapers picked up on a piece by Dave Musgrove asking whether it might be time to have the Bayeux Tapestry brought over from France for an exhibition. In November 2009 the Today Programme on BBC Radio 4 reported on a story in the magazine about when history ends and current affairs begin.

== Advisory board ==
The magazine once had an advisory board of historians including

- Richard Evans
- Ian Kershaw
- Kenneth O Morgan
- Laurence Rees
- Simon Schama

== Podcast ==
In June 2007 the magazine launched the first of its podcasts featuring interviews with leading historians.

== See also ==
- BBC Worldwide
