= This Long Pursuit =

Autobiographical book by Richard Holmes

- First edition (UK)
- Author: Richard Holmes
- Subject: Autobiography, historiography
- Published: 2016 (HarperCollins)
- Pages: 368
- ISBN: 978-0-307-37968-9 (Hardcover)

This Long Pursuit is an autobiographical book written by biographer Richard Holmes and published by HarperCollins in 2016. It covers his methods, techniques, and memoirs.
