= Richard Holmes (biographer) =

British author and academic

Richard Holmes OBE FRSL FBA
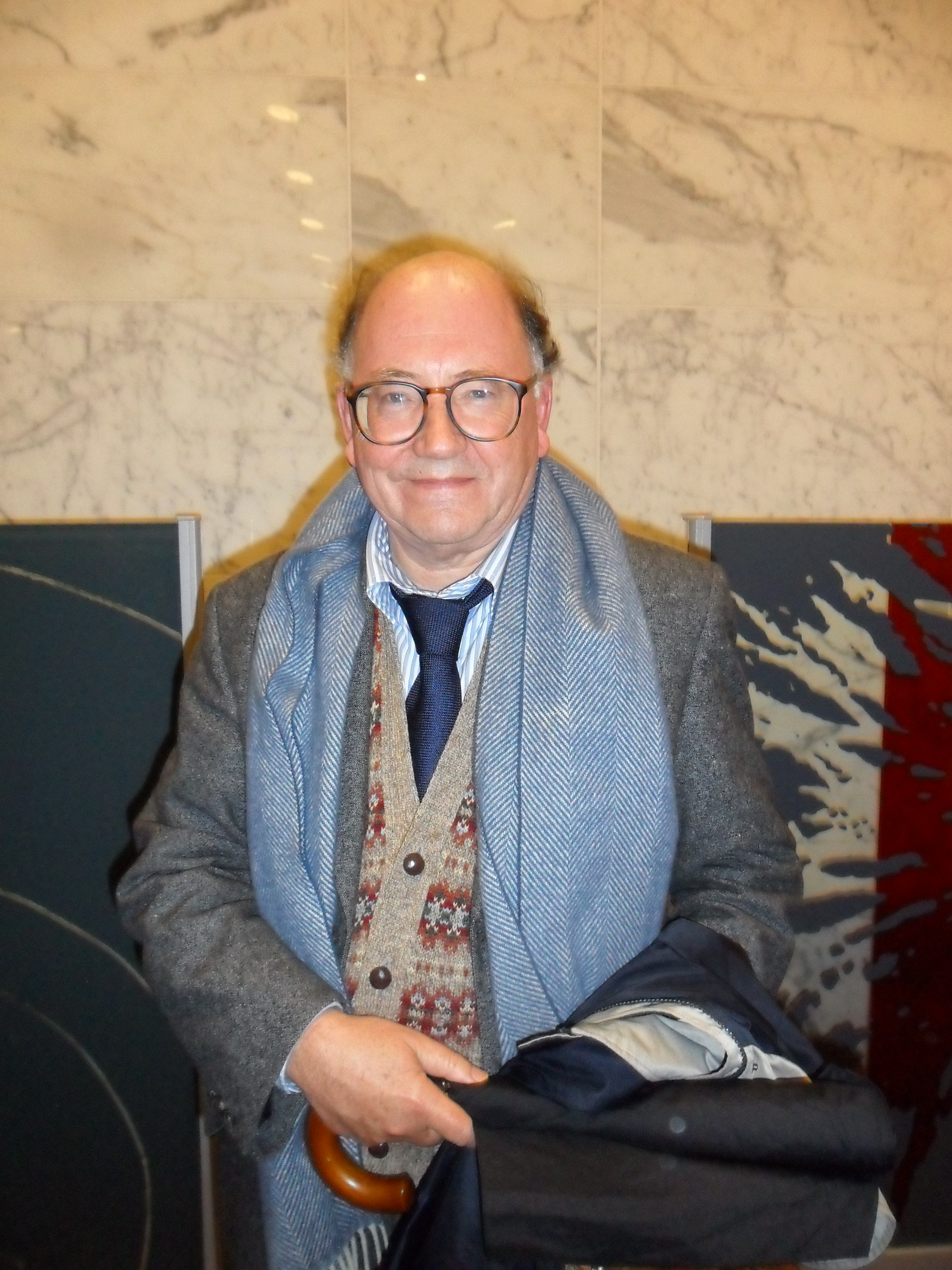
- Born: 5 November 1945 (age 80); London, England
- Education: Churchill College, Cambridge
- Occupations: Author, academic

Richard Gordon Heath Holmes, OBE, FRSL, FBA (born 5 November 1945) is a British author and academic best known for his biographical studies of major figures of British and French Romanticism.

== Biography ==
Richard Gordon Heath Holmes was born on 5 November 1945 in London. He was educated at Downside School, Somerset, and Churchill College, Cambridge. He is a fellow of The Royal Society of Literature and a fellow of the British Academy. He was professor of Biographical Studies at the University of East Anglia from 2001 to 2007 and has honorary doctorates from the University of East London, University of Kingston, and the Tavistock Institute. In the 1992 Birthday Honours, he was appointed an Officer of the Order of the British Empire (OBE). He lives in London and Norfolk with his wife, British novelist Rose Tremain.

== Literary biography ==
Holmes's major works of Romantic biography include: Shelley: The Pursuit which won him the Somerset Maugham Award in 1974; Coleridge: Early Visions, which won him the 1989 Whitbread Book of the Year Prize (now the Costa Book Awards); Coleridge: Darker Reflections, the second and final volume of his Coleridge biography which won the Duff Cooper Prize and the Heinemann Award; and Dr. Johnson and Mr. Savage, concerning the friendship between eighteenth-century British literary figures Samuel Johnson and Richard Savage, which won the James Tait Black Prize.

Holmes is also the author of two studies of European biography. Footsteps: Adventures of a Romantic Biographer is a highly acclaimed volume of memoirs and personal reflections on the biographer's art and Sidetracks: Explorations of a Romantic Biographer collects his shorter pieces, including an early, groundbreaking essay on Thomas Chatterton and an introductory account of the lives and works of Mary Wollstonecraft and William Godwin.

He is editor of the Harper Perennial series Classic Biographies, launched in 2004.

His 2005 monograph on biography and portraiture for the National Portrait Gallery, Insights: The Romantic Poets and their Circle, was unusual in that it included scientists alongside literary writers. He has also written many drama-documentaries for BBC Radio, most recently The Frankenstein Experiment (2002), and A Cloud in a Paper Bag (2007) about 18th century balloon mania.

October 2008 saw his first major work of biography in over a decade, The Age of Wonder: How the Romantic Generation Discovered the Beauty and Terror of Science, published by HarperPress. In it he explores the scientific ferment that swept across Britain at the end of 18th century. Holmes proposes a radical vision of science before Charles Darwin, exploring the earliest ideas of deep time and deep space, the creative rivalry with the French scientific establishment, and the startling impact of discovery on great writers and poets such as Mary Shelley, Coleridge, Byron and Keats. The book received wide review coverage (see below), was featured on BBC Radio 4's Book of the Week and became a best-seller.

In Falling Upwards: How We Took to the Air (2013), Holmes approaches the history of ballooning by presenting biographies of French, English, and American balloonists. The personalities and experiences of those involved are varied and surprising. Balloons were used successfully to send information out of besieged Paris in 1870, and unsuccessfully to fly to the North Pole in the 1890s, to name only two examples. In Holmes' history of ballooning, science meets showmanship and both literary flights and actual adventures capture the imagination.

In 2025 Homes published his first single-subject biography in nearly three decades, "The Boundless Deep: Young Tennyson, Science and the Crisis of Belief", analyzing the youthful years of Alfred, Lord Tennyson's life and literary career. Holmes distills the revelations that shook Tennyson’s world to three essentials: “biological evolution, a godless universe, and planetary extinction.” He identifies an enduring metaphor for the “wonder and horror” of these ideas in a very early Tennyson sonnet, “The Kraken.”

== Bibliography ==
External videos
- Falling Upwards: An Interview with Richard Holmes on YouTube, Chemical Heritage Foundation
- Richard Holmes and Romantic Science in the Age of Wonder on YouTube, Chemical Heritage Foundation

- One for Sorrow (Poems – published by Cafe Books in 1970)
- Shelley: The Pursuit (Published by Weidenfeld and Nicolson in 1974, current edition published by HarperPerennial ISBN 978-0-00-720458-8)
- My Fantoms by Théophile Gautier (Edited and translated – Published by Quartet Books in 1976, reprinted by the New York Review of Books, 2008, ISBN 978-1-59-017271-1)
- Shelley on Love: Selected Writings (Published by Anvil Books in 1980, current edition published by HarperPress ISBN 978-0-00-655012-9)
- Coleridge (Past Masters) (Published by Oxford University Press in 1982)
- Nerval: The Chimeras (translated by Peter Jay with an introduction by Holmes, Published by Anvil Press in 1985)
- Footsteps: Adventures of a Romantic Biographer (Published by Hodder and Stoughton in 1985, current edition published by HarperPerennial ISBN 978-0-00-720453-3)
- Mary Wollstonecraft and William Godwin: A Short Residence in Sweden and Memoirs (Published by Penguin Classics in 1987)
- Kipling: Something of Myself (Co-author with Robert Hampson – (Published in Penguin Classics in 1987)
- De Feministe en De Filosoof' (Published in Amsterdam in 1988)
- Coleridge: Early Visions (Published by Hodder and Stoughton in 1989, current edition published by HarperPerennial ISBN 978-0-00-720457-1)
- Dr Johnson and Mr. Savage (Published Hodder and Stoughton in 1993, current edition published by HarperPerennial ISBN 978-0-00-720455-7)
- Coleridge: Selected Poems (Editor – Published by HarperPress in 1996 ISBN 978-0-00-255579-1)
- Coleridge: Darker Reflections (Published by HarperPress in 1998, current edition published by HarperPerennial ISBN 978-0-00-720456-4)
- Sidetracks: Explorations of a Romantic Biographer (Published by HarperPress in 2000, current edition published by HarperPerennial ISBN 978-0-00-720454-0)
- The Age of Wonder: How the Romantic Generation Discovered the Beauty and Terror of Science (Published by HarperPress in 2008 ISBN 978-0-00-714952-0)
- Falling Upwards: How we Took to the Air (Published by William Collins in 2013 ISBN 978-0-00-738692-5)
- This Long Pursuit: Reflections of a Romantic Biographer (Published by William Collins in 2016 ISBN 978-0-307-37968-9)
- The Boundless Deep: Young Tennyson, Science and the Crisis of Belief (Published by HarperCollins in 2025 ISBN 978-0-008-69685-6) – shortlisted for 2025 Baillie Gifford Prize and for 2026 Wolfson History Prize

Classic Biographies Series (HarperPerennial) edited by Richard Holmes

- Defoe on Sheppard and Wild: The True and Genuine Account of the Life and Actions of the Late Jonathan Wild by Daniel Defoe (2004, ISBN 978-0-00-711168-8)
- Southey on Nelson: The Life of Nelson by Robert Southey (2004, ISBN 978-0-00-711170-1)
- Scott on Zélide: Portrait of Zélide by Geoffrey Scott (2004, ISBN 978-0-00-711173-2)
- Johnson on Savage: The Life of Mr Richard Savage by Samuel Johnson (2005, ISBN 978-0-00-711169-5)
- Godwin on Wollstonecraft: The Life of Mary Wollstonecraft by William Godwin (2005, ISBN 978-0-00-711176-3)
- Gilchrist on Blake: The Life of William Blake by Alexander Gilchrist (2005, ISBN 978-0-00-711171-8)
