= Sidetracks (book) =

- First edition (UK)
- Author: Richard Holmes
- Subject: Autobiography, biography
- Published: 2000
- Publisher: HarperCollins (UK); Pantheon Books (US)
- Pages: 420
- ISBN: 0-00255-578-6
- LC Class: PR6058.O445 Z464 2000

Sidetracks: Explorations of a Romantic Biographer is an autobiographical book by the biographer Richard Holmes, his second of three.
