= Living History Magazine =

Former British historical magazine

Living History was a monthly history magazine launched in April 2003 by Origin Publishing in the United Kingdom. The magazine was devoted entirely to British history.

As the name implied it was intended to encourage readers to get out and see historical sites, and featured articles to make visits to those places easier.

Particularly important was a pull-out section entitled "Footsteps" which could be removed without destroying the rest of the magazine. This covered a number of different walks/visits across the country each month, with maps and details on a full A4 page.

Following the takeover of Origin by BBC Worldwide in 2004, Living History ceased to exist as an independent magazine. It was incorporated as an integral part of the BBC's rival magazine BBC History from June 2004.

Though the editor of Living History, Dave Musgrove, moved across to BBC History, much of the material did not. The emphasis of Living History on British history was abandoned. The BBC magazine covered international history and politics which Living History did not, so the back third of BBC History took on Living History's approach to delving deep into destinations, TV and radio, reviews and visiting sites.

The UK based "Footsteps" section was reduced from whole page pull-outs to half-page articles not intended to be removable from the magazine, and were replaced with international History Holidays. Initially the innovative ideas inherent in Living History were developed further still by the whole editorial team, subsequently the magazine was completely absorbed into BBC History magazine, with the emphasis on British history and magazine name being lost.
