= Footsteps (autobiography) =

Autobiography

- First edition (UK)
- Author: Richard Holmes
- Subject: Autobiography, biography, Romanticism
- Published: 1985
- Publisher: Hodder & Stoughton (UK); Viking Press (US)
- Pages: 288
- ISBN: 0-67032-353-5
- LC Class: PR110 F7 H64 1985

Footsteps: Adventures of a Romantic Biographer is an autobiographical book by the biographer Richard Holmes, published in 1985. Harper Perennial first published reprints of Footsteps in 2005.
