= Devil's Footprints =

Unexplained phenomenon in England in 1855

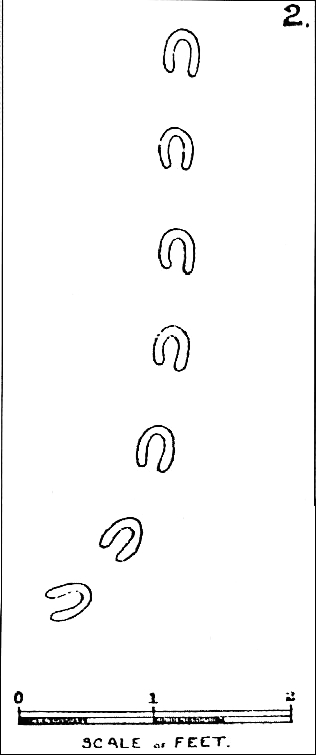
- An example of the tracks as shown by The Illustrated London News, 1855
- Date: 8–9 February 1855
- Location: Exe Estuary in East Devon and South Devon, England
- Type: Trails of hoof-like marks appeared overnight in the snow

The Devil's Footprints was a phenomenon that occurred during February 1855 around the Exe Estuary in east and south Devon, England. After a heavy snowfall, trails of hoof-like marks appeared overnight in the snow covering a total distance of some 40 to 100 miles (60 to 160 km). The footprints were so called because some persons suggested that they were the tracks of Satan and made comparisons to a cloven hoof. Many theories have been made to explain the incident, and some aspects of its veracity have also been questioned.

== Incident ==
On the night of 8–9 February 1855 and one or two later nights, after a heavy snowfall, a series of hoof-like marks appeared in the snow. These footprints, most of which measured about 4 inches (10 cm) long, 3 inches (7.6 cm) across, between 8 and 16 inches (20 and 41 cm) apart and mostly in a single file, were reported from more than 30 locations across Devon and a couple in Dorset. It was estimated that the total distance of the tracks amounted to between 40 and 100 miles (60 and 160 km). Houses, rivers, haystacks and other obstacles were travelled straight over. Footprints appeared on the tops of snow-covered roofs and high walls which lay in the footprints' path as well as leading up to and exiting drain pipes as small as 4 inches (10 cm) in diameter. The 26 May 1855 issue of Bell's Life in Sydney published in its Miscellaneous Extracts column a "Weekly Dispatch" dated 18 February:

The superstitious go so far as to believe that they are the marks of Satan himself; and that great excitement has been produced among all classes may be judged from the fact that the subject has been descanted on from the pulpit. It appears on Thursday last night, there was a very heavy snowfall in the neighbourhood of Exeter and the South of Devon. On the following morning the inhabitants of the above towns were surprised at discovering the footmarks of some strange and mysterious animal endowed with the power of ubiquity, as the footprints were to be seen in all kinds of unaccountable places – on the tops of houses and narrow walls, in gardens and court-yards, enclosed by high walls and palings, as well in open fields.

[...]

The impressions of the foot closely resembled that of a donkey's shoe, and measured from an inch and a half to (in some instances) two and a half inches across. Here and there it appeared as if cloven, but in the generality of the steps the shoe was continuous, and, from the snow in the centre remaining entire, merely showing the outer crest of the foot, it must have been concave.

The area in which the prints appeared extended from Exmouth, up to Topsham, and across the Exe Estuary to Dawlish and Teignmouth. R.H. Busk, in an article published in Notes and Queries during 1890, stated that footprints also appeared further afield, as far south as Totnes and Torquay, and that there were other reports of the prints as far away as Weymouth (Dorset) and even Lincolnshire.

== Evidence ==
There is little direct evidence of the phenomenon. The only known documents were found after the publication during 1950 of an article in the Transactions of the Devonshire Association asking for further information about the event. This resulted in the discovery of a collection of papers belonging to Henry Thomas Ellacombe, the vicar of Clyst St George during the 1850s. These papers included letters addressed to the vicar from his friends, among them the Reverend G. M. Musgrove, the vicar of Withycombe Raleigh in Exmouth; the draft of a letter to The Illustrated London News marked 'not for publication'; and several apparent tracings of the footprints.

Mike Dash collated the available primary and secondary source material into a paper entitled "The Devil's Hoofmarks: Source Material on the Great Devon Mystery of 1855" which was published in Fortean Studies during 1994.

== Hypotheses ==
Many explanations have been made for the incident. Some investigators are sceptical that the tracks really extended for more than a hundred miles, arguing that no-one would have been able to follow their entire course in a single day. Another reason for scepticism, as Joe Nickell indicates, is that the eye-witness descriptions of the footprints varied from person to person.

In his Fortean Studies article, Mike Dash concluded that there was no one source for the "hoofmarks": some of the tracks were probably hoaxes, some were made by "common quadrupeds" such as donkeys and ponies, and some by wood mice (see below). He admitted, though, that these cannot explain all the reported marks and "the mystery remains".

=== Balloon ===
Author Geoffrey Household suggested that "an experimental balloon" released by mistake from Devonport Dockyard had left the mysterious tracks by trailing two shackles on the end of its mooring ropes. His source was a local man, Major Carter, whose grandfather had worked at Devonport at the time. Carter claimed that the incident had been hushed up because the balloon also wrecked a number of conservatories, greenhouses, and windows before finally descending to earth in Honiton.

While this could explain the shape of the prints, sceptics have questioned whether the balloon could have travelled such a random zigzag course without its trailing ropes and shackles becoming caught in a tree or similar obstruction.

=== Hopping mice ===
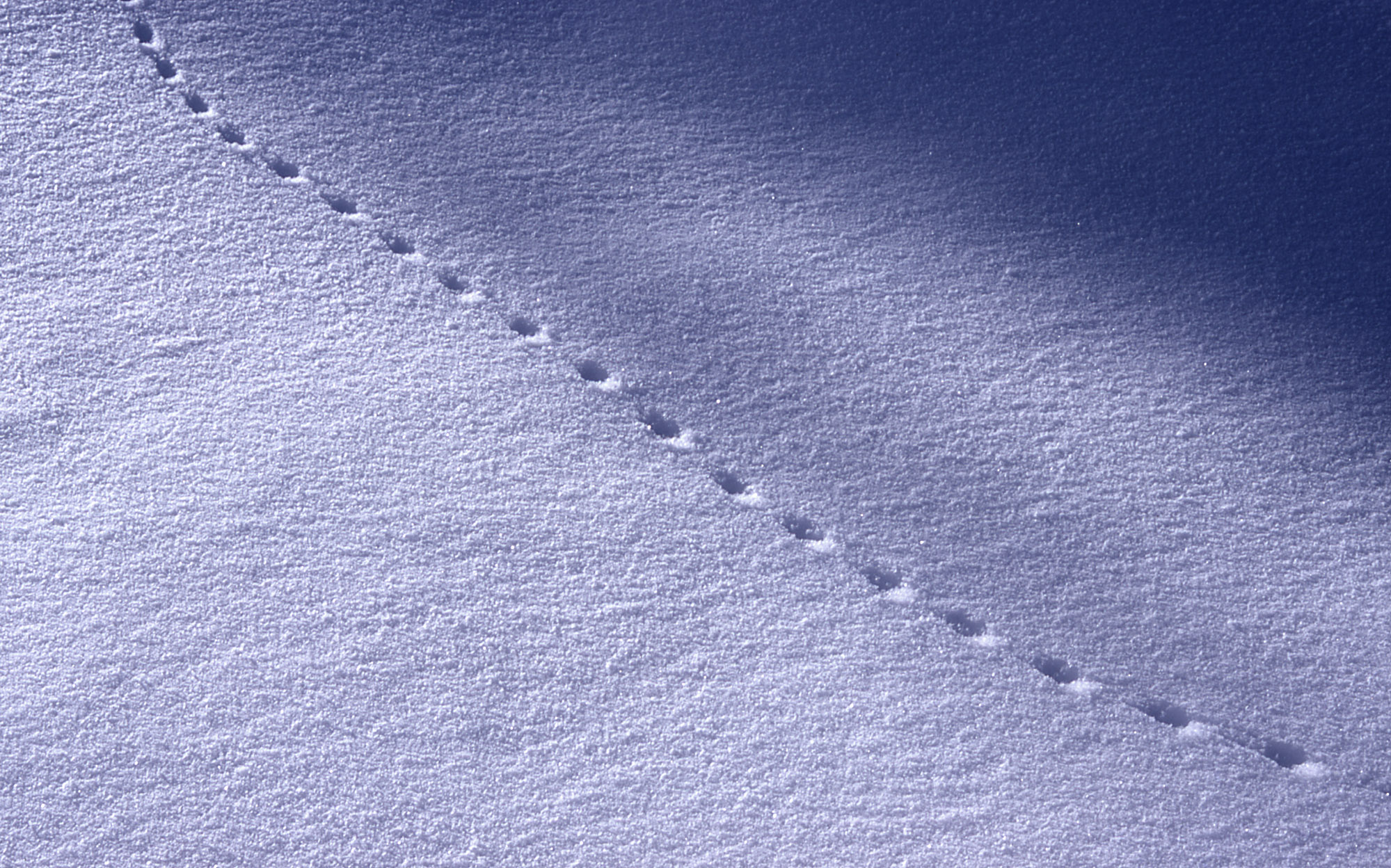
Rodent (Mus) prints in snow

Mike Dash suggested that at least some of the prints, including some of those found on rooftops, could have been made by hopping rodents such as wood mice. The print left behind after a mouse leaps resembles that of a cloven-hoofed animal, due to the motions of its limbs when it jumps. Dash stated that the theory that the Devon prints were made by rodents was originally proposed as long ago as March 1855, in The Illustrated London News. In the paper's 10 March 1855 issue, Thomas Fox, a brewer and brick maker of Ballingdon, submitted illustrations of rodent tracks in varying snow depths as well as a diagram for how rodents' hind and forelimbs create the "hoof" shaped prints.

=== Kangaroo ===
In a letter to the Illustrated London News during 1855, Rev. G. M. Musgrave wrote: "In the course of a few days a report was circulated that a couple of kangaroos escaped from a private menagerie (Mr Fische's, I believe) at Sidmouth." It seems, though, that nobody ascertained whether the kangaroos had escaped, nor how they could have crossed the Exe estuary, and Musgrave himself said that he invented the story to distract his parishioners' concerns about a visit from the devil:

I found a very apt opportunity to mention the name of kangaroo, in allusion to the report then current. I certainly did not pin my faith to that version of the mystery ... but the state of the public mind of the villagers ... dreading to go out after sunset ... under the conviction that this was the Devil's work ... rendered it very desirable that a turn should be given to such a degraded and vitiated notion ... and I was thankful that a kangaroo ... [served] to disperse ideas so derogatory...

— Rev G. M. Musgrove: letter to The Illustrated London News, 3 March 1855.

=== Badgers ===
In a letter to the editor of the Illustrated London News published 3 March 1855, Richard Owen stated the theory that the footprints were from a badger, arguing the animal was "the only plantigrade quadruped we have in this island" and it "leaves a footprint larger than would be supposed from its size". The number of footprints, he suggested, was indicative of the activity of several animals because "it is improbable that one badger only should have been awake and hungry" and added that the animal was "a stealthy prowler and most active and enduring in search of food".

== Similar incidents ==
Reports of similar anomalous, obstacle-unheeded footprints exist from other parts of the world, although none is of such a scale. This example was reported 15 years earlier in The Times:

Among the high mountains of that elevated district where Glenorchy, Glenlyon and Glenochay are contiguous, there have been met with several times, during this and also the former winter, upon the snow, the tracks of an animal seemingly unknown at present in Scotland. The print of the foot in every respect is an exact resemblance of that of a foal of considerable size, with this small difference perhaps, that the sole seems a little longer or not so round; but, as no one has had the good fortune as yet to have obtained a glimpse of this creature, nothing more can be said of its shape or dimensions; only it has been remarked, from the depth to which the feet sunk in the snow, that it must be a beast of considerable size; it has been observed also, that its walk is not like that of the generality of quadrupeds, but that it is more like the bounding or limping of a hare when not scared or pursued. It is not in one locality only that its tracks have been met with, but through a range of at least twelve miles...

— The Times, 14 March 1840, p. 1.

In the Illustrated London News of 17 March 1855, a correspondent from Heidelberg wrote, "upon the authority of a Polish Doctor in Medicine", that on the Piaskowa-góra (Sand Hill), a small elevation on the border of Galicia, but in Congress Poland, such marks are to be seen in the snow every year, and sometimes in the sand of this hill, and "are attributed by the inhabitants to supernatural influences".

During 2013, trails were reported in Girvan, Scotland, possibly as part of an April Fool's hoax.

== See also ==
- Dark Was the Night (2014)
- Jersey Devil – the appearance during January 1909 of similar mysterious footprints in New Jersey, USA
- Phantom kangaroo
- The Great Thunderstorm, Widecombe – another legend of the Devil in Devon
- Urban legend

== Sources ==
- Dash, Mike (1994). "The Devil's Hoofmarks". Fortean Studies. 1. online at Academia.edu: 71–150.

== External links and further reading ==
- Charles Fort, The Book of the Damned, Chapter 28.
- Mysterious Britain & Ireland
- Dunning, Brian. "Skeptoid #31: The Devil Walked in Devon". Skeptoid.
- Ridout, Brian V. (2021). "The Devil's Footprints Revisited". Report and Transactions of the Devonshire Association. 153. The Devonshire Association: 291–306. ISSN 0309-7994.
