= Forensic footwear evidence =

Crime scene analysis

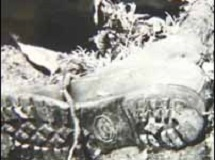
Crime scene photograph of an unidentified murder victim found in Kansas in 1973

Forensic footwear evidence can be used in legal proceedings to help prove that a shoe was at a crime scene. Footwear evidence is often the most abundant form of evidence at a crime scene and in some cases can prove to be as specific as a fingerprint. Initially investigators will look to identify the make and model of the shoe or trainer which made an impression. This can be done visually or by comparison with evidence in a database; both methods focus heavily on pattern recognition and brand or logo marks. Information about the footwear can be gained from the analysis of wear patterns which are dependent on angle of footfall and weight distribution. Detailed examination of footwear impressions can help to link a specific piece of footwear to a footwear imprint as each shoe will have unique characteristics.

== Types of footwear evidence ==
Footwear evidence can come in at least three forms, footwear outsole impressions, footwear insole impressions and footwear trace evidence.

=== Footwear outsole impressions ===
Footwear outsole impressions are impressions left on an object that was caused by contact with a piece of footwear. These can be left on the ground or raised surface by persons treading over it, left on doors or walls by persons attempting to kick or climb over a wall or even left on other persons after being kicked or stomped on.

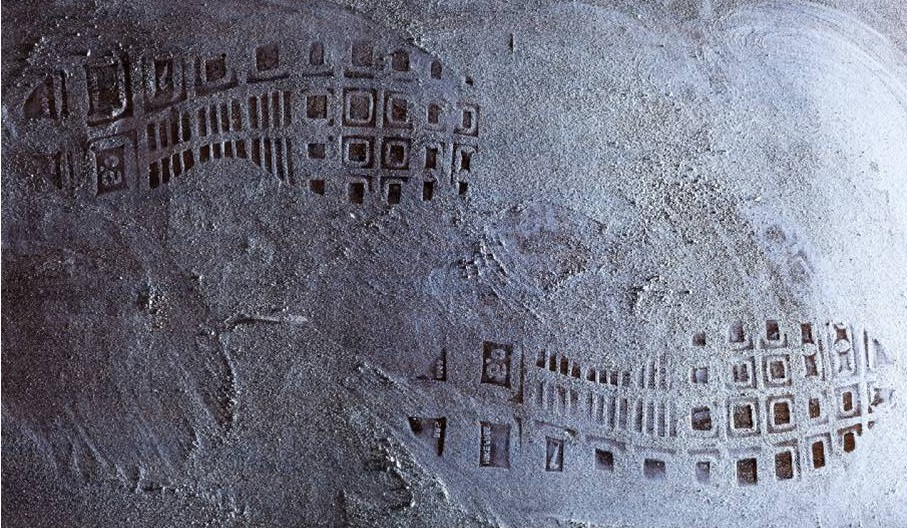
Shoeprints left on a dusty surface

There can also be latent impressions not easily visible to the naked eye, on many different surfaces such as floor tiles, concrete or even carpet. Detection may require the use of additional specialized light sources such as portable ultraviolet lighting. Recovery typically includes photography as well as lifting with "gel" or "electrostatic" dust lifters.

=== Footwear insole imprints ===
Imprints of a person's foot can be left on the insole (inside) of footwear. Due to the sweat and dirt from the foot the insole impression can be left regardless of the wearers foot being in a sock or other covering. The size and arrangement of foot and toe imprints can be used to determine whether a person has worn a piece of footwear. The analysis and comparisons of foot imprints is part of the discipline of forensic podiatry. The insole will show a virtual image of the bare foot print of the wearers foot. This can be compared to the actual barefoot print of the shoe owner to gain a match. A 3d optical surface scan can then be used to build up a model of the foot itself. Useful in forensic evidence casting and identification. H Farmer BSc Hons Fs 2018

=== Footwear trace evidence ===
Footwear trace evidence is trace evidence that is recovered from footwear. Types of trace evidence that could be recovered include skin, glass fragments, body hair, fibers from clothing or carpets, soil particles, dust and bodily fluids. The study of this trace evidence could be used to link a piece of footwear to a location or owner. DNA can be one of the contributing factors in forensic footwear evidence.

== Detection of footwear evidence ==
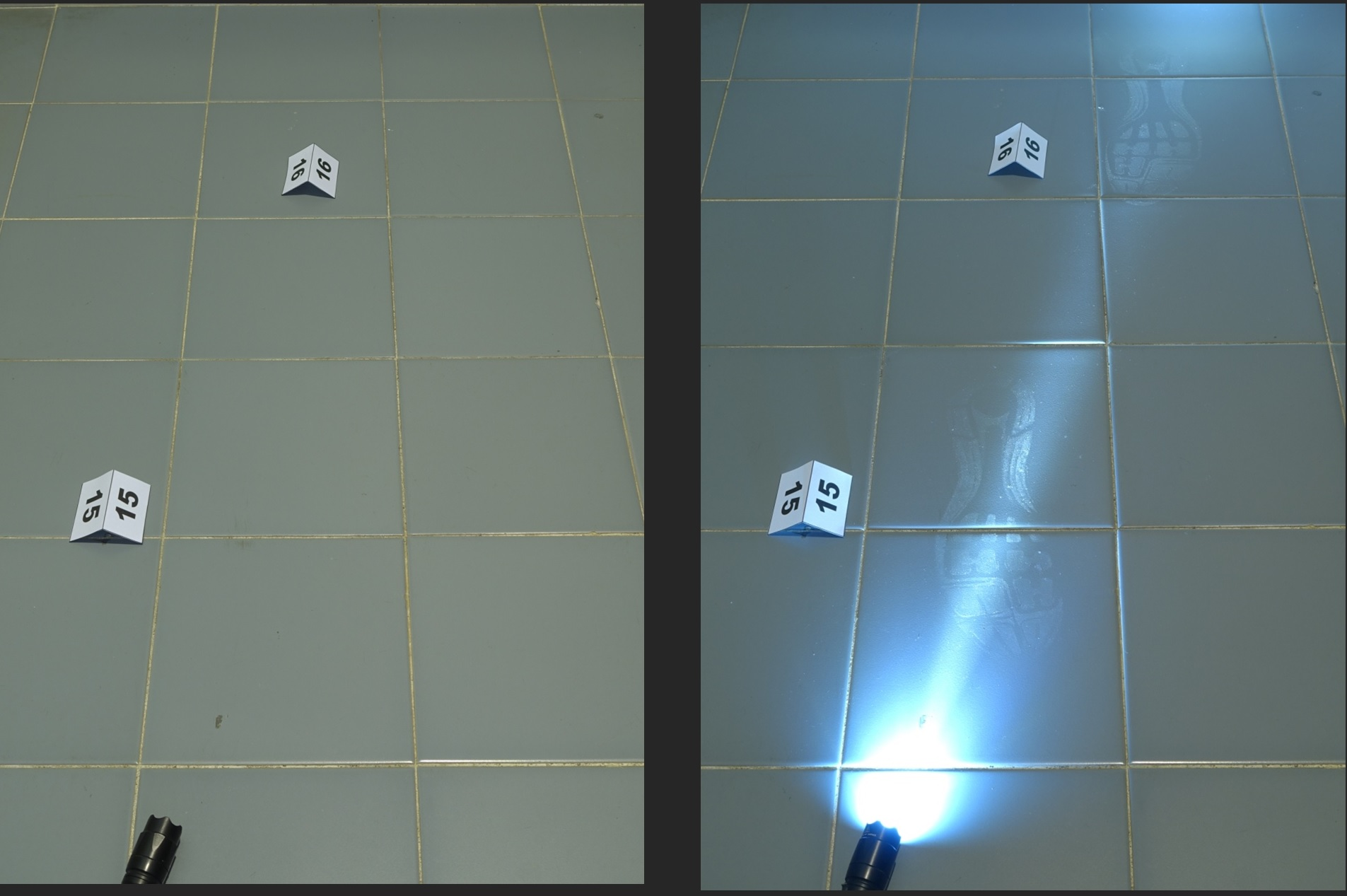
Footwear impression revealed by oblique lighting

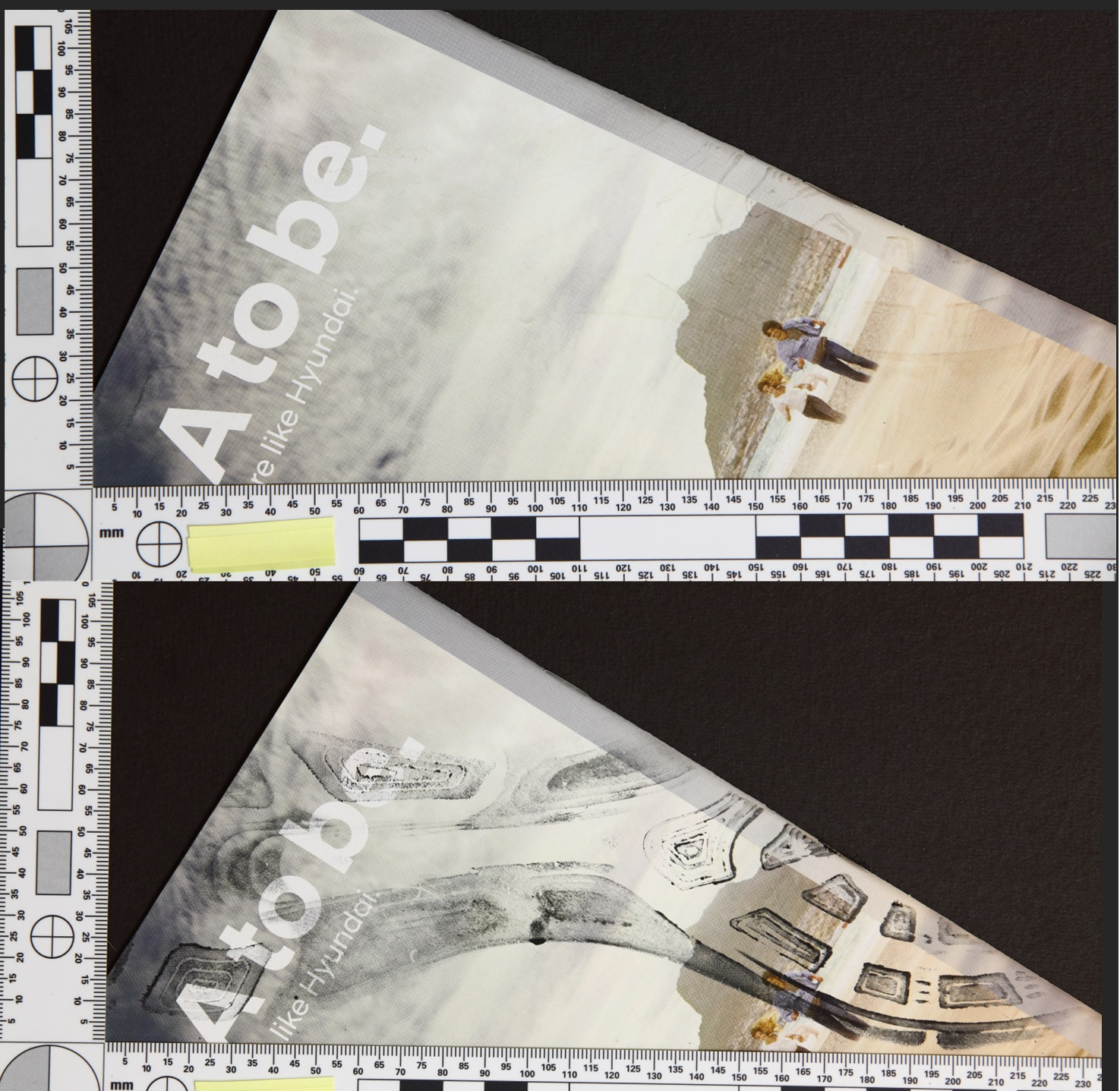
Footwear impression details revealed with fingerprint powder

Footwear impressions can be detected with a variety of methods including:

- Visually using natural or artificial lighting.
- Using artificial light sources to provide oblique, coaxial, and polarized light for detection of visible and latent impressions.
- Using electrostatic lifting devices to lift dusty impressions.
- Using fingerprint powder to develop latent impressions.
- Using physical or chemical enhancement methods to develop or enhance faint impressions.

=== Alternate Light Source ===
Alternate light source is the use of a bright white light, such as a flashlight, to better see dusty prints on the ground that may not otherwise be visible to the eye. An alternate light source is usually used by applying oblique lighting to an area of floor to more easily locate footprints to be lifted.

=== Fingerprint Powder ===
Similarly to the use of fingerprint powder in fingerprint analysis, fingerprint powder is used when there is a latent footprint that is composed of mostly oils, instead of dust or dirt. The use of fingerprint powder allows the analyst to more easily find the print and identify the characteristics of the print.

=== Other Visualization Methods ===
In the case of visualizing footprints, sometimes spray paints are also used to see the details of the impression better, especially in cases of prints in snow which can be tricky to photograph without being spray painted first.

== Recovery of footwear impression evidence ==
Footwear evidence occurs most often as either footwear impressions left in a soft surface, such as mud, or as dust deposits, which are difficult for the human eye to detect. At violent crimescenes footmarks can be left as a result of a person standing in blood and subsequently trailing it as they move around the scene. The recovery of footwear evidence involves fixing and lifting or casting of the prints to preserve the details of the print and be used for further analysis and comparison.

=== Lifting ===
Footwear impressions can be lifted from surfaces with tools such as adhesive lifters, gelatin lifters or electrostatic lifting devices. These methods are similar to that of fingerprint lifting, which are lifted using one of the previously mentioned methods and then placed on a black or white backing card (depending on the color of the print substrate) to better see the details of the print and for evidence preservation purposes. Adhesive lifters are essentially pieces of tape with a backing on them that are smoothly applied to the print, lifted off of the print and then attached to a backing card. Gelatin lifters are flexible gel sheets made of gelatin which are applied to the 2D impression in the same manner as adhesive lifters and then are covered by the plastic sheet provided with the gelatin lifters. Electrostatic lifting involves the use of high-voltage current on a lifting plate to lift the elements of the print, without disturbing the area as much as traditional lifting methods do, followed by transferring the print from the lifting plate to a gelatin lifter or adhesive lifter.

=== Casting ===
Evidence left via impressions can generally be recovered utilizing a plaster cast or dental stone. Initially the impression is isolated by framing the area with a solid boundary. Following this a plaster mix can be gently poured inside the frame; it is generally considered not best practice to pour directly onto the impression. In some cases where the surface is not ideal for casting prior techniques can be utilised to gain a better cast of the impression. Sand can often be fixed in place by applying an aerosol resin or glue although hair spray is often used in combination with chalk to assist in ease of lifting the cast out of the print more gently. Wet mud impressions can be dried using a combination of pipetting water from the surface and applying hot air, often in the form of a hair dryer.

==== Fixing Techniques ====
When using plaster to cast a footprint, it is recommended to use a fixing agent to prevent the loss of detail when creating a plaster cast. These fixing agents include shellacs, glues, aerosol resins and hairsprays, which are sprayed liberally on the print before pouring the plaster of Paris into the impression. Often times, chalk is also applied to the impression as an added protective measure against damaging the print.

==== Plaster/Dental Stone ====
Generally speaking, plaster of Paris and dental stone are mixed in the same way at a scene, usually by adding water to the powder in a baggy until a thick, but pourable consistency and then pouring the mixture indirectly into the impression. After the plaster/stone is applied it is allowed to set and then gently lifted out of the impression. The reason that plaster and dental stone are not used in snow prints is because dental stone heats up as it sets, while prill sulfur will only cool down as it sets.

==== Prill Sulfur ====
In instances where there are impressions in snow or slush, prill sulfur is used to avoid melting the impression substrate. Prill sulfur is prepared by melting the sulfur on a hot plate in a well ventilated area and then allowing the mixture to cool, while stirring continuously. The sulfur mixture can then be poured into the impression and left to set and then analyzed.

=== 3D Optical Surface Scanning ===
Footwear evidence can be recovered with use of 3D scanners.

There are two types of 3D scanners used in forensics:

- crime scene scanners able to capture a large overview map of the scene;
- ‘close-up’ 3D scanners able to capture individual objects in high resolution and full colour.

Advantage of 3D scanning over casting is that 3D scanners can scan the object without touching or affecting it – most 3D scanners use lasers to capture 3D information. Some scanners can also capture the colour surface, [null producing] a visually [null accurate] replica of the object. To create a complete and highly detailed 3D model of a footprint less than 15 minutes is required. HF 2018

=== Three-dimensional imaging ===
Recent approach takes advantage of digital photography. A set of digital images of a footmark or target area of interest, taken in different viewpoints is required to create detailed and accurate 3D model. Appropriate software allows to visualise a 3D model in different ways, make accurate measurements from a 3D trace or perform a comparison of multiple traces.

== Examination of footwear impressions evidence ==
Footwear impression can reveal information that may be of use to forensic investigators. Analysis of impressions found at a crime scene may provide the following information:

Number of people at a crime scene: Different footwear impressions left at a crime scene will indicate more than one person was present at the crimescene.
Approximate height of the wearer: There is statistical correlation between foot/footwear size and height and also stride length and height. The dimensions of the footwear impression and the distance between impressions can be used to provide an estimate of height.
Activity of wearer when impression was made: Plastic footwear impression left on soft surfaces can reveal whether a person was walking, running or carrying a heavy load when the impression was made. An impression made by person running will make impressions that are deeper in the heel and toe sections. A person carrying a heavy load such as a body will leave imprints that are deeper than when not carrying a heavy load.
Manufacture, model and approximate size of footwear: Footwear impression can show the design elements (shapes, patterns, arrangement) that form the outsole design. These can be compared with a footwear outsole database to identify the model of footwear that made the impression. Knowledge of the model of footwear that made the impression can assist in narrowing down the list of suspects and can also be used to link multiple crime scenes to the same perpetrator(s).
Establish link between crime scene impression with a specific piece of footwear: Comparison of crime scene impressions with a specific piece of footwear recovered from a suspect can determine if there is any relationship. A worn piece of footwear will gradually acquire unique wear and tear on the outsoles. These randomly acquired characteristics will be unique to that specific shoe and may show in crime scene impressions.

- If class characteristics and size matches: investigators can determine that footwear could have made the impression, but other footwear with similar design and size could also have made the impression.
- If class characteristics, size match and randomly acquired characteristics found in the footwear outsole can also be found in the crime scene impressions: Investigators can determine that the specific piece created the crime scene impression. This relationship can be used as evidence to prove that the footwear's owner was at the crime scene.
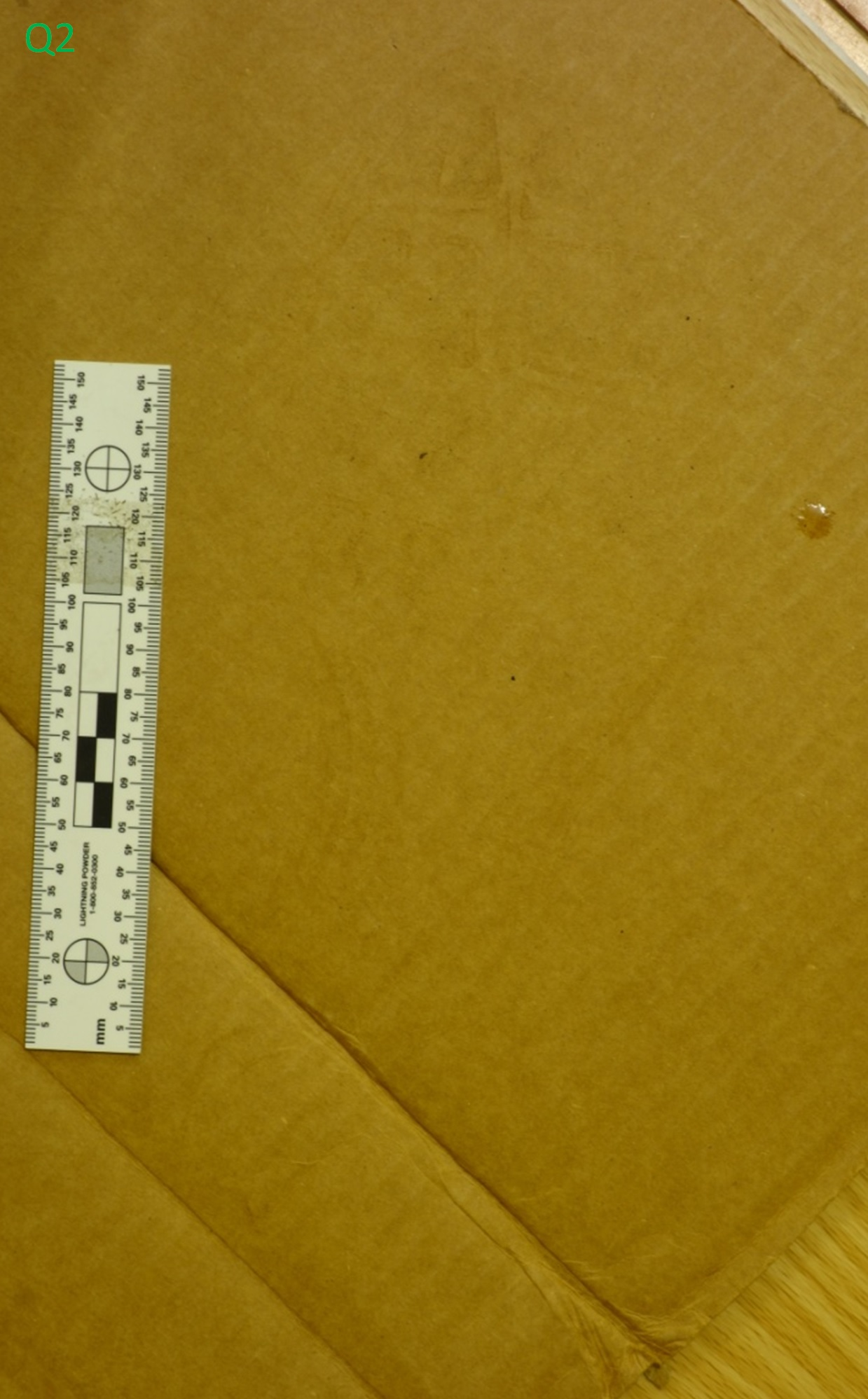
Latent footwear impression found at a crime scene

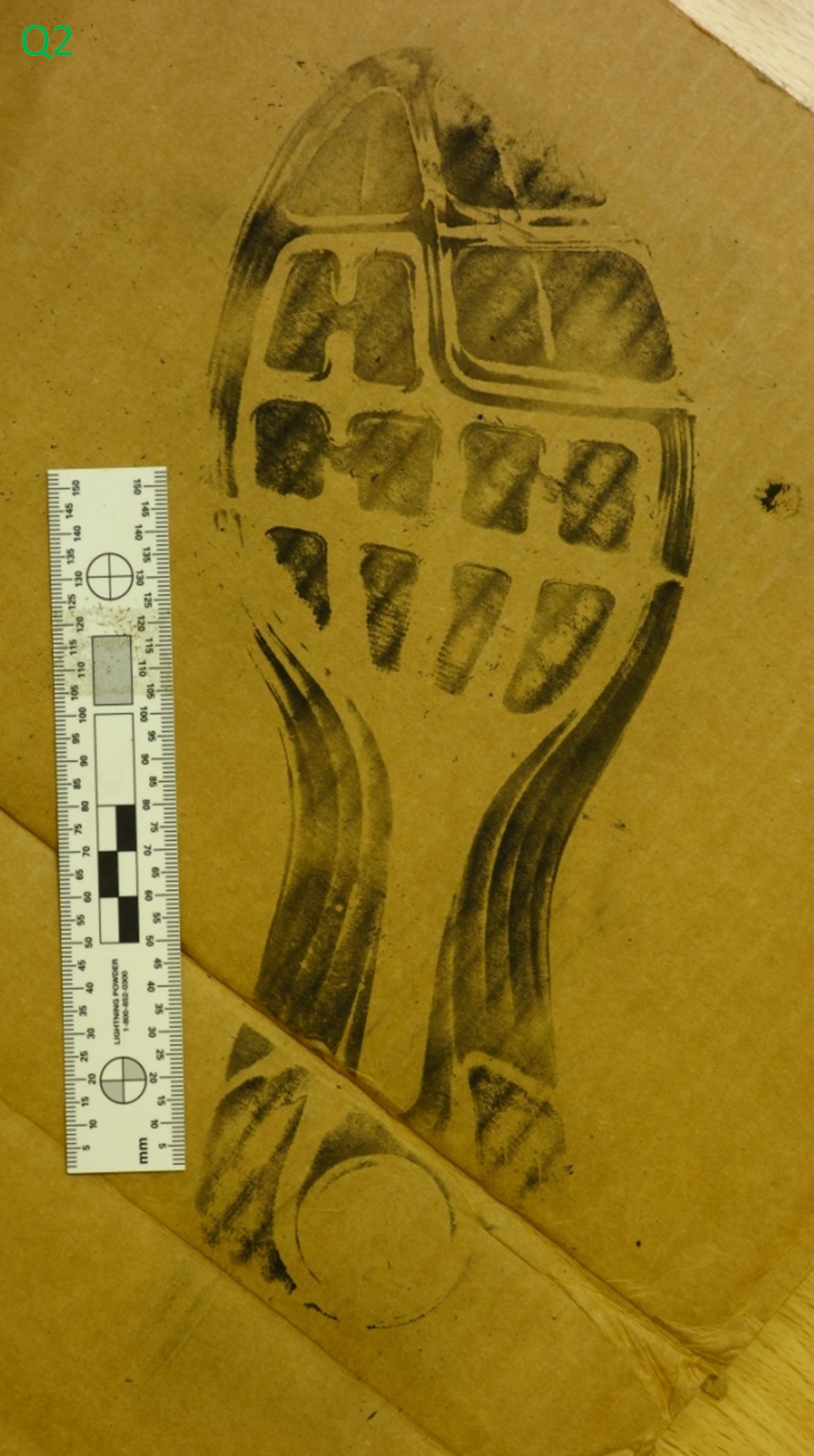
Latent footwear impression after treatment with fingerprint powder

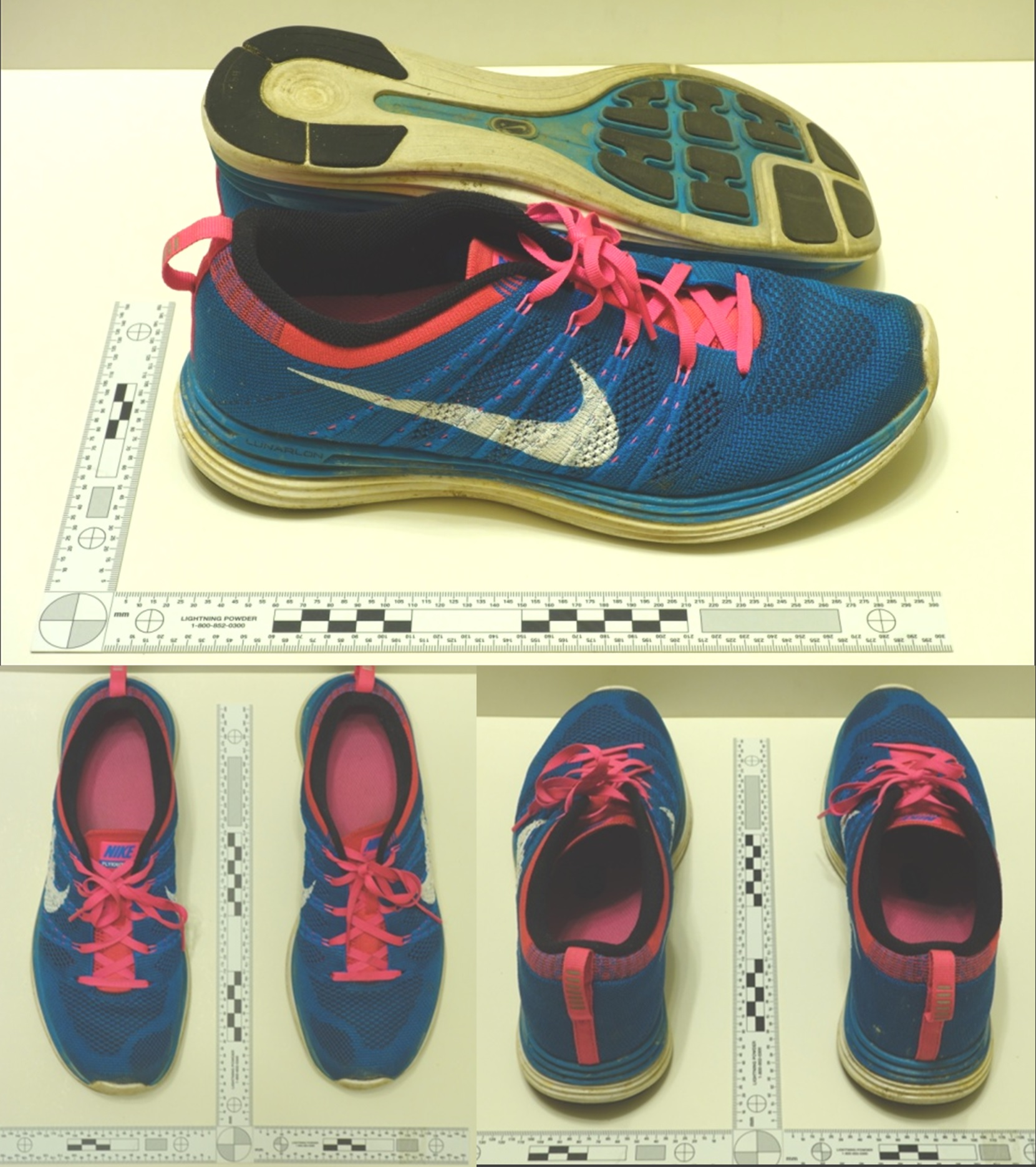
A suspect's footwear 1

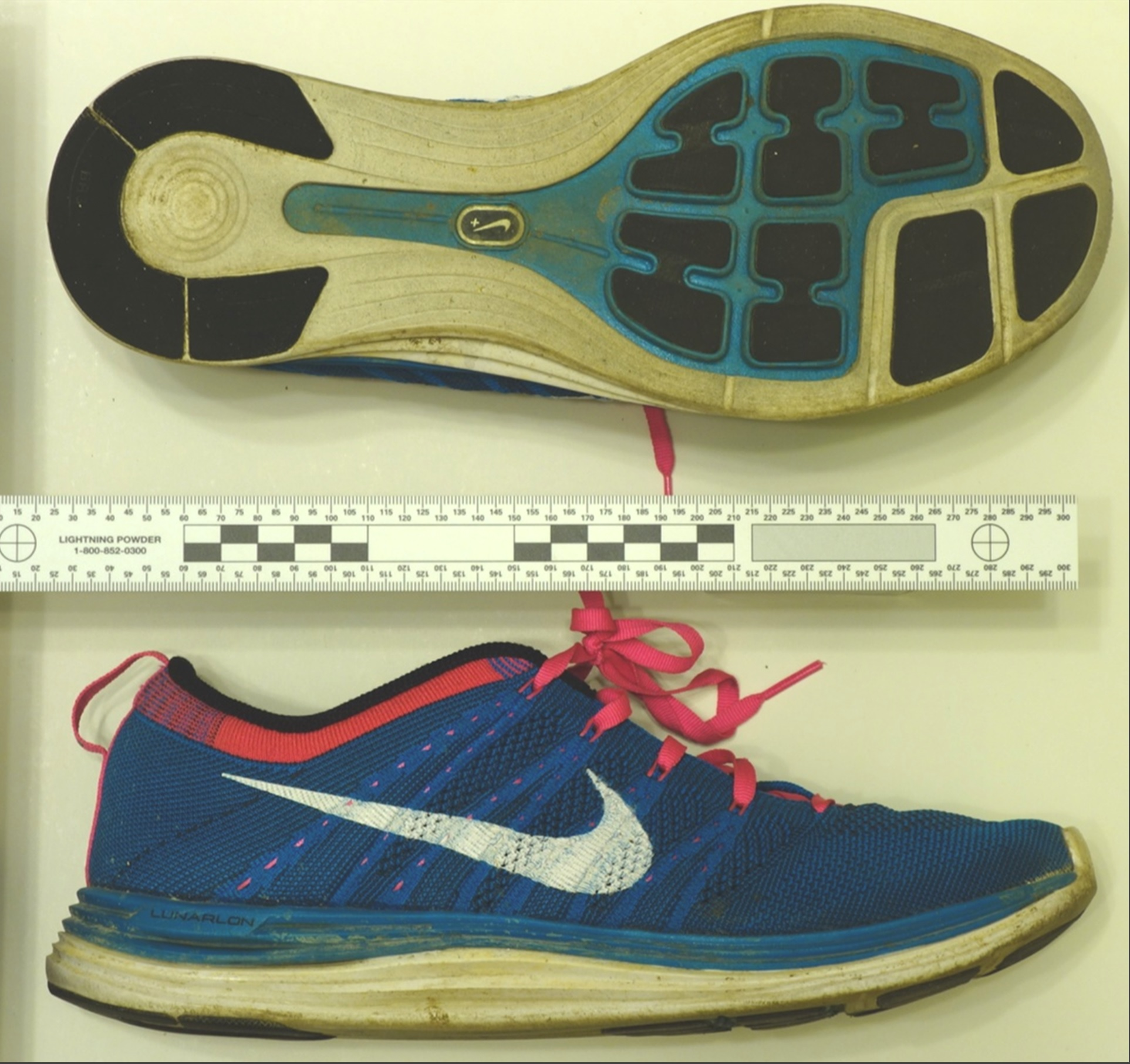
A suspect's footwear 2

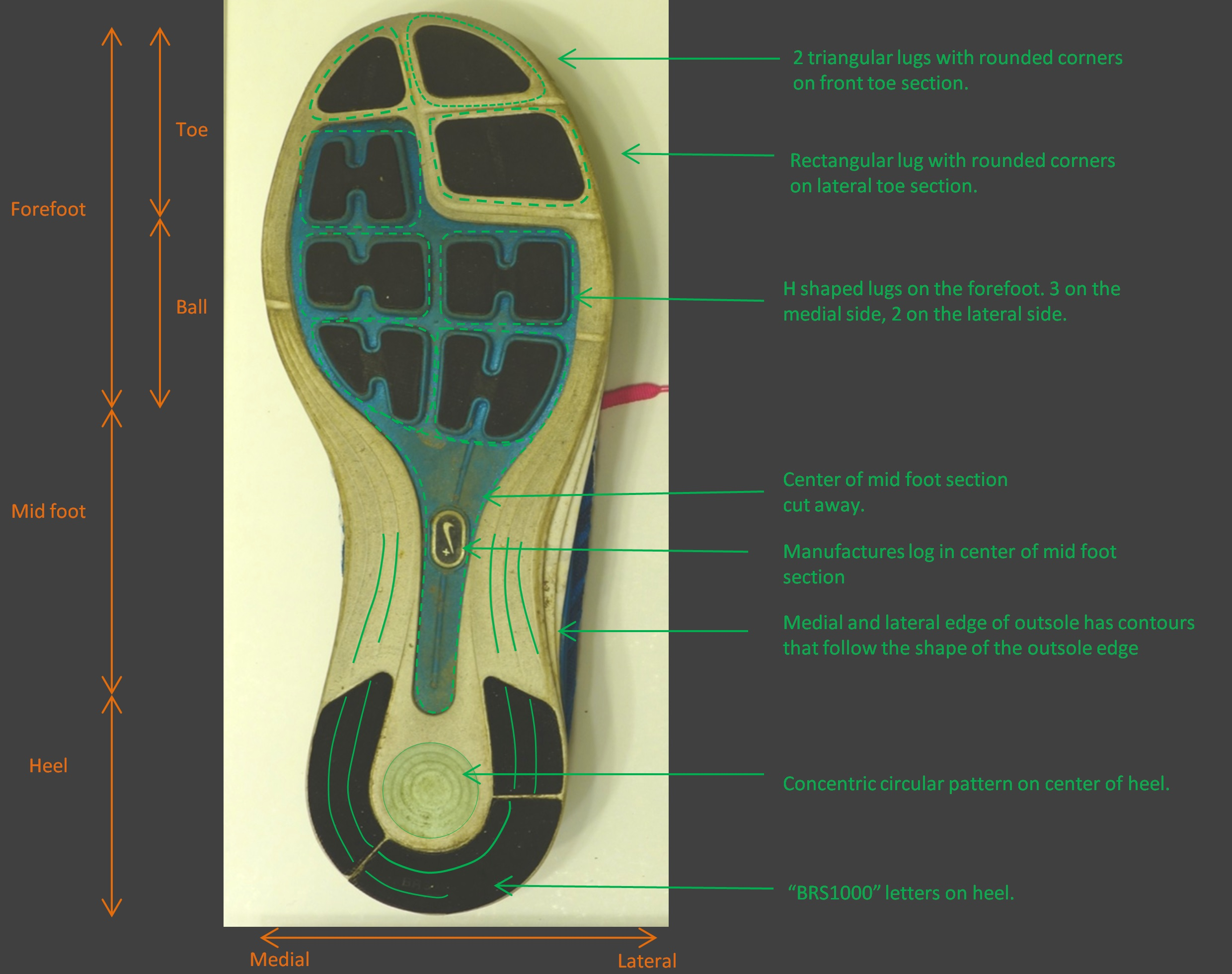
Suspect's footwear class characteristics

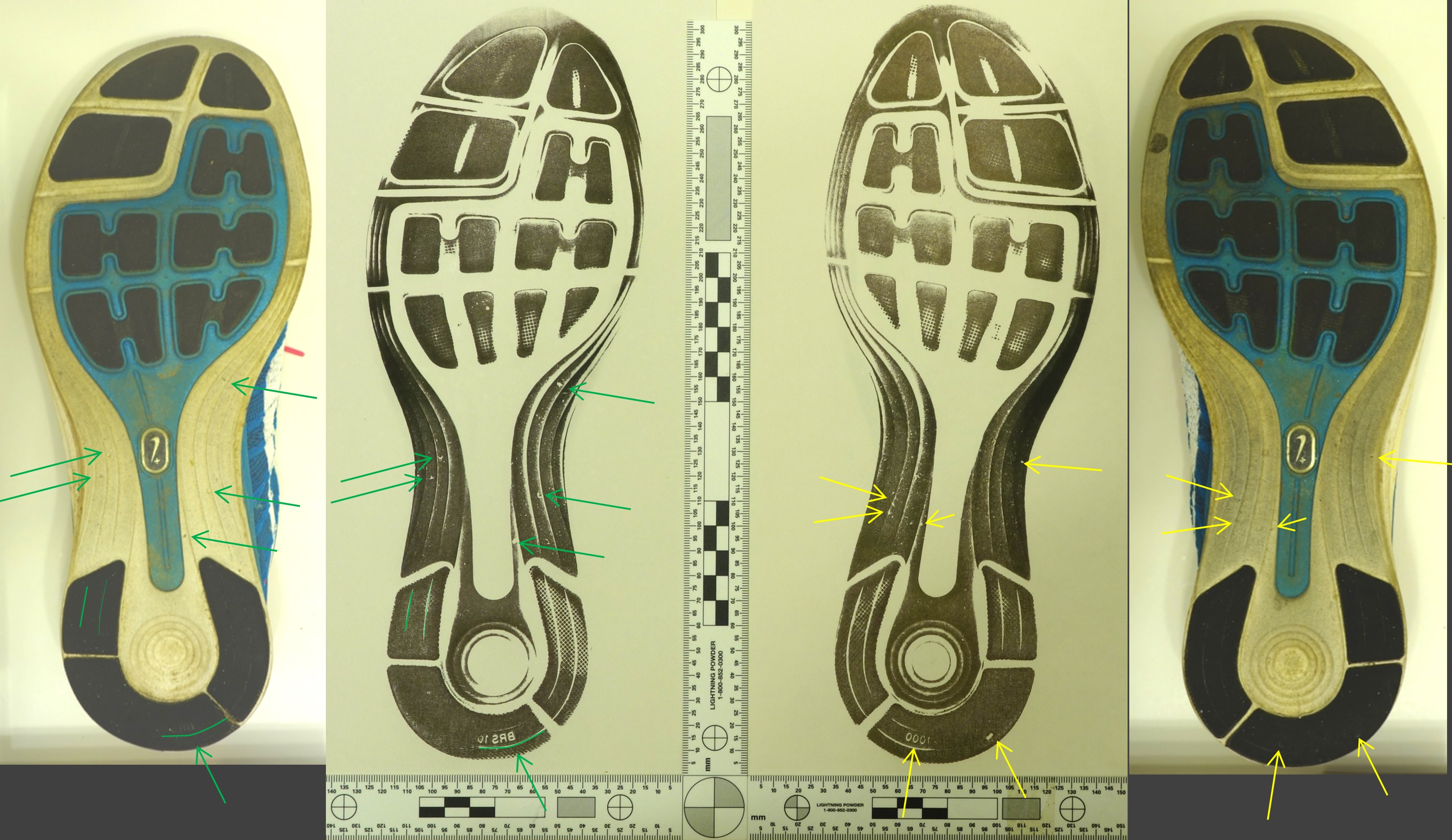
Suspect's footwear with unique characteristics labeled

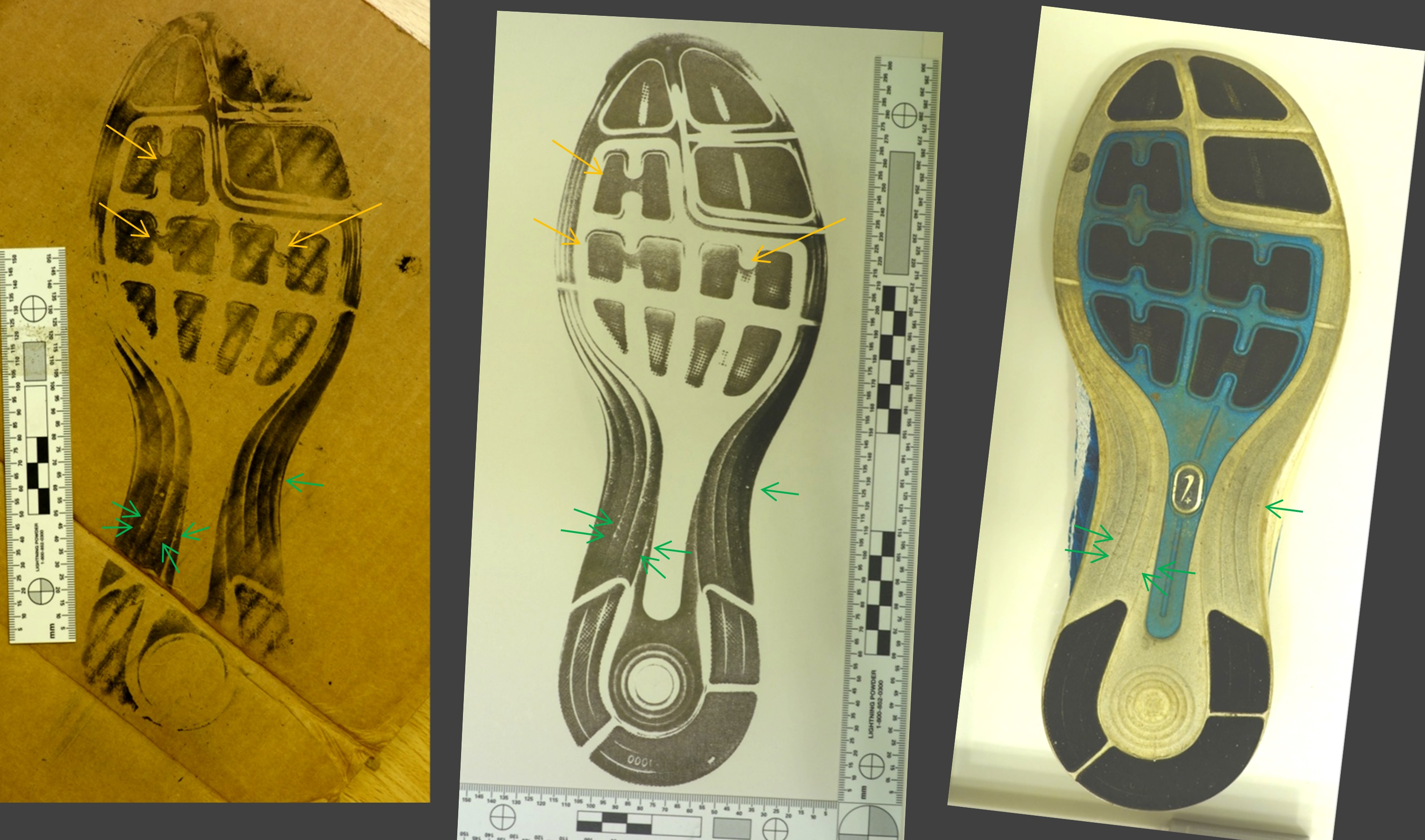
Comparison of crimescene impression with suspect's footwear (labeled)

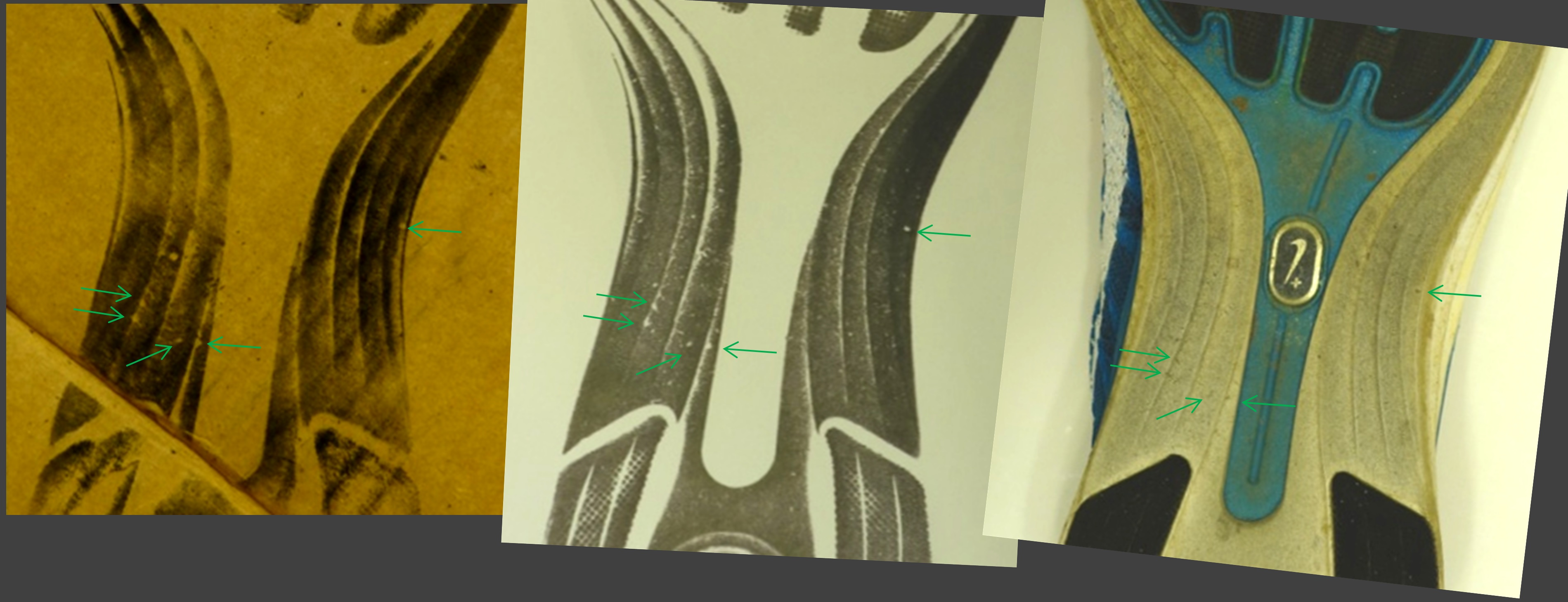
Comparison of crimescene impression with suspect's footwear (closeup)

== Limitations of footwear evidence ==
The Unabomber, Theodore Kaczynski, was known to keep shoes with smaller soles attached to the base in order to confuse investigators about the size of the suspect's feet.

There is a lack of scientific research and evidence to support footprint evidence in criminal investigations and convictions. While footwear evidence has appeared to be useful in some high-profile cases, such as Richard Ramirez’s (aka The Night Stalker) unique ‘Avia’ shoeprints helped investigators link together his crimes, it must be evaluated cautiously. In the Ramirez case the footwear impressions used to link his crimes were not the primary evidence used to convict him of his crimes. There have been cases where footprint evidence has assisted in wrongful conviction, such as Charles Irvin Fain who was wrongfully convicted and sentenced to death row. The forensic investigator testified that the shoe prints found at the crime scene matched the ‘walking gait’ of Fain, though analysis of this type has never been scientifically validated. Fain was later exonerated based on DNA evidence after almost 18 years on death row.

It must also be considered that footprints discovered at a crime scene remain fixed, while the wearer of the footwear continues on likely changing the wear of the shoe. Thus, unless the print is immediately matched its potential value may be lost. Also of concern is the lack of science and standards demonstrating that footwear marks are unique. There are a lack of scientific studies demonstrating how many characteristics are needed to determine a match with such evidence. This is similar to other forensic evidence such as bite mark analysis, tire tread analysis, etc. where there is little scientific evidence of its efficacy. In 2009, the National Academy of Sciences made the conclusion that, aside from DNA, there was little if not any, scientific evidence for many forensic disciplines, including footprint evidence.

== Footwear databases ==
Forensic investigators can use computerized footwear databases to quickly compare the class characteristics such as tread design and possibly identify a manufacturer, brand, and model to the ones stored in the database.

- Everspry
- Forensity
- Foster and Freeman
- PRIDE
- Raven technologies

== Footwear Software ==
- DigTrace

== See also ==
- Digital footprint
