= Moso's Footprint =

Coordinates: 13.501535°S 172.766933°W

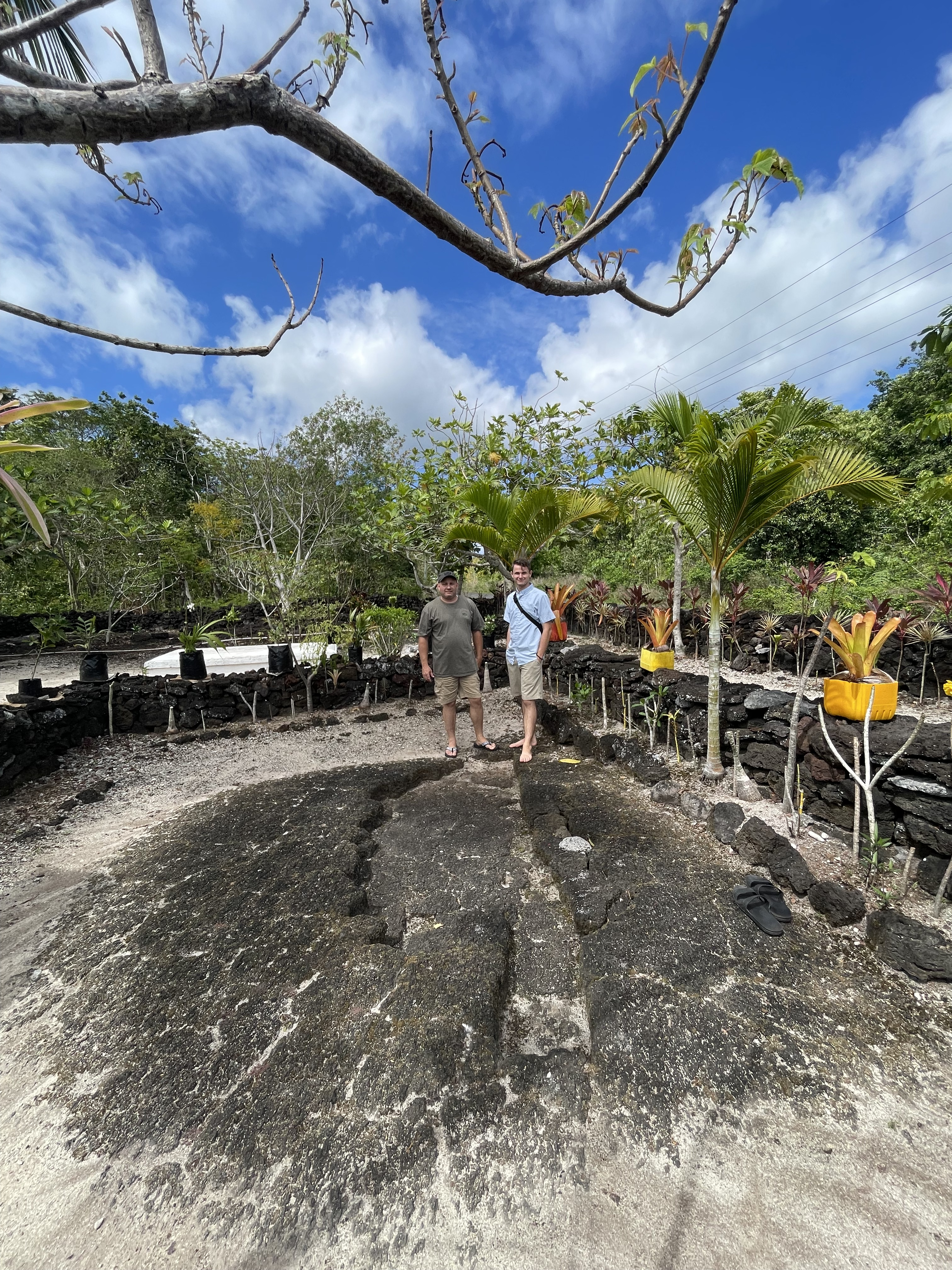
Moso's Footprint 2022

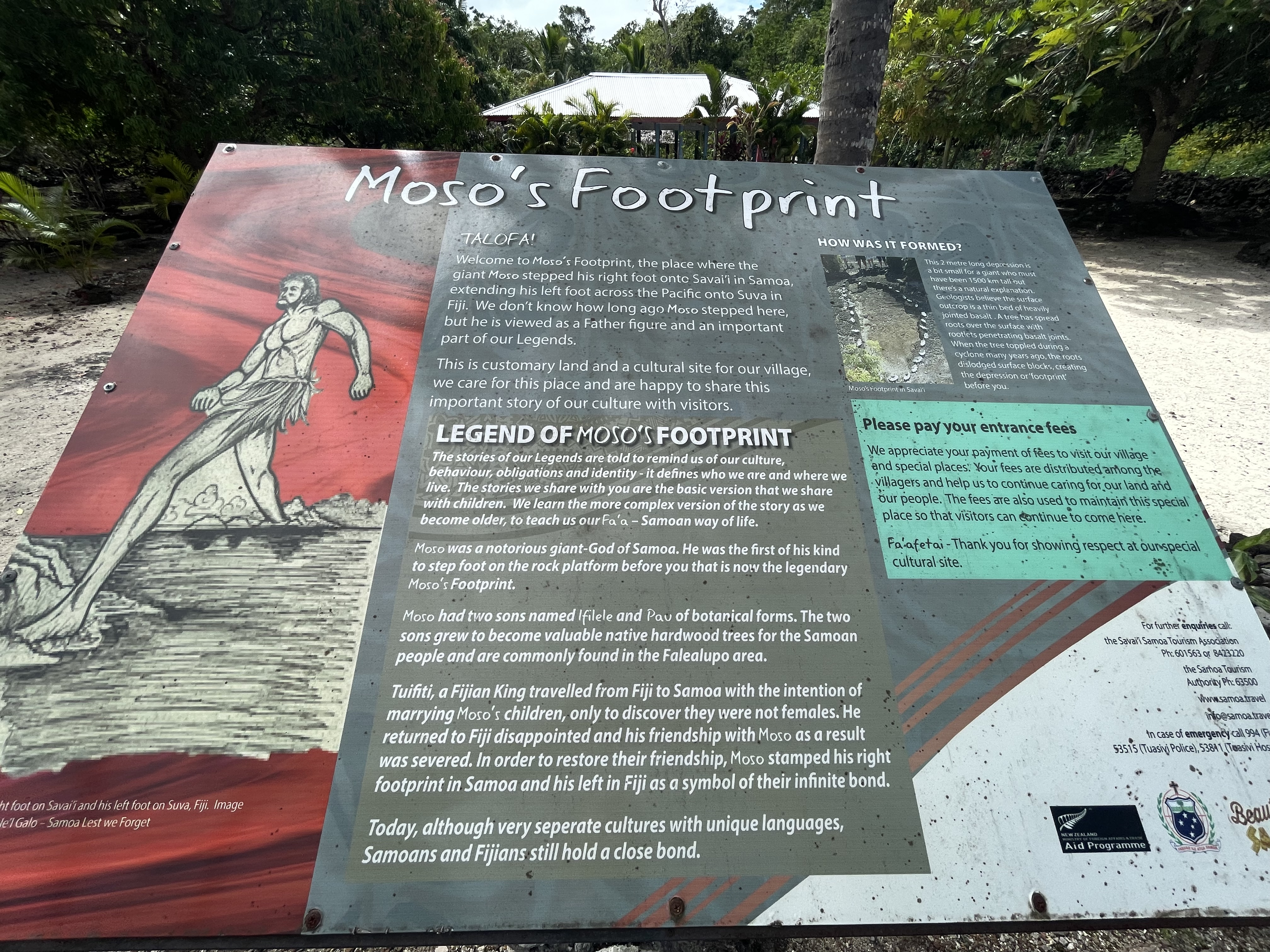
Moso's Footprint Plaque from Savai'i Tourism Association 2022

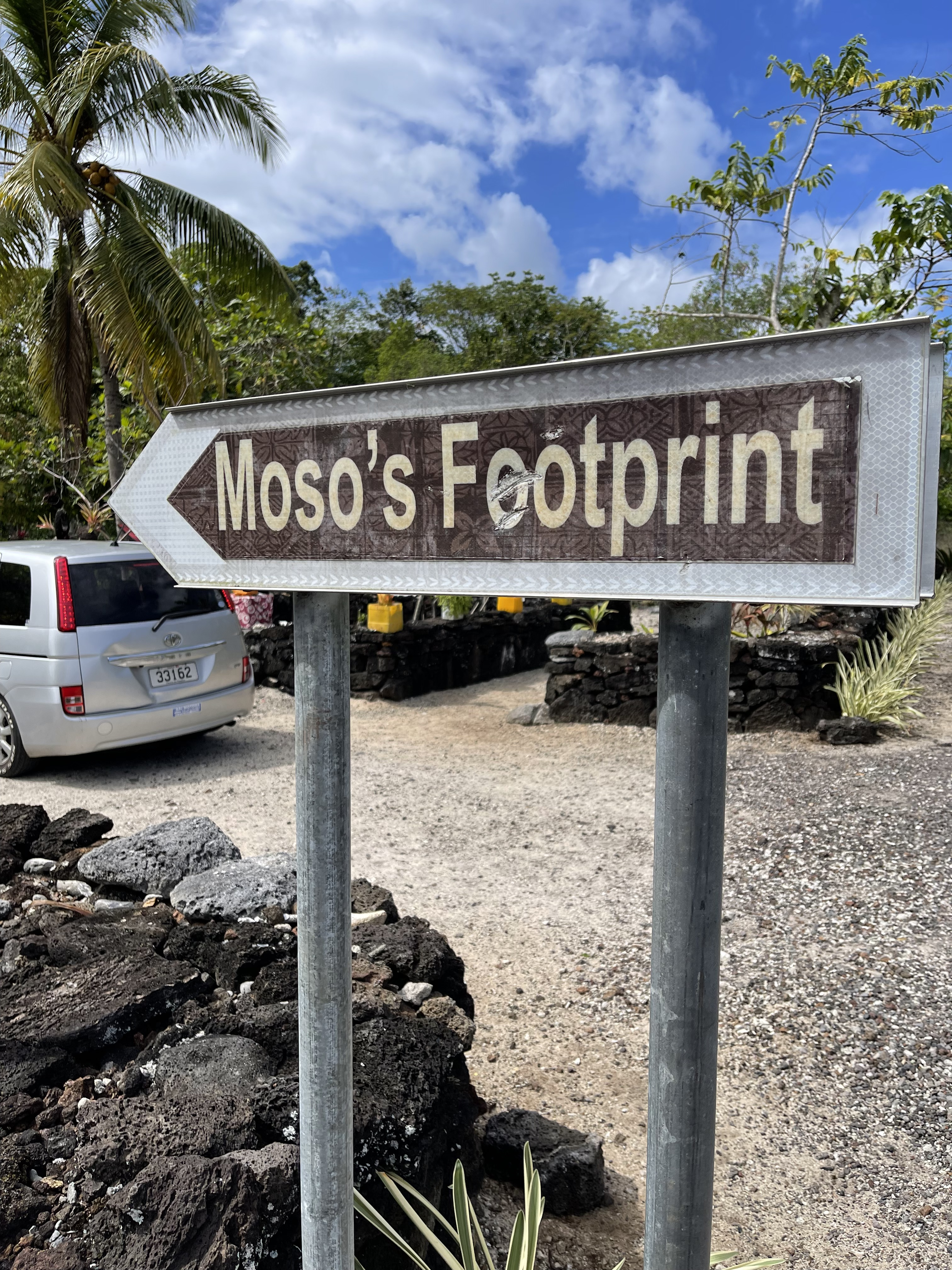
Moso's Footprint Entrance 2022

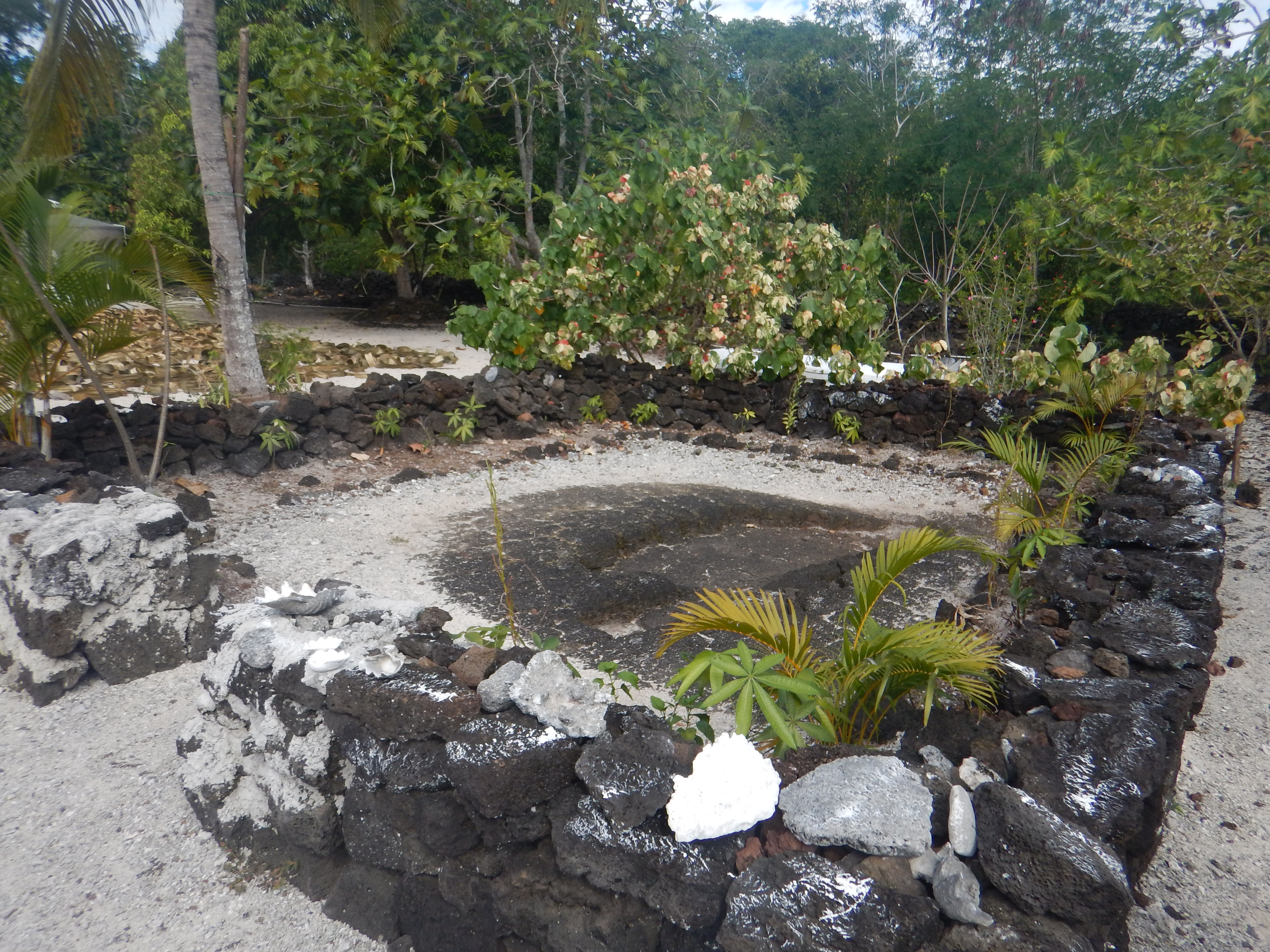
Moso's Footprint

According to myth, Moso's Footprint in Samoa was made when the giant Moso stepped over to Fiji from Samoa, and the other footprint can be found on Viti Levu of Fiji. It is a 2m long depression in basalt.

== The Legend of Moso's Footprint ==
Moso was a notorious giant-God of Samoa. Moso had two sons named Filele and Pau of botanical forms. The two sons grew to become valuable native hardwood trees for the Samoan people and are commonly found in the Falealupo area. Tuifiti, a Fijian King traveled from Fiji to Samoa with the intention of marrying Moso's children, only to discover they were not females. He returned to Fiji disappointed and his friendship with Moso as a result was severed. In order to restore their friendship, Moso stamped his right footprint in Samoa and his left in Fiji as a symbol of their infinite bond. Today, although very separate cultures with unique languages, Samoans and Fijians still hold a close bond.

=== How was the footprint actually formed? ===
This 2m long depression is a bit small for a giant who must have been 1500 km tall but there's a natural explanation. Geologists believe the surface outcrop is a thin bed of heavily jointed basalt. A tree has spread roots over the surface with rootlets penetrating basalt joints. When the tree toppled during a cyclone many years ago, the roots dislodged surface blocks, creating the depression or 'footprint' before you.

== See also ==
- Petrosomatoglyph
