= John P. Jumper =

United States Air Force general

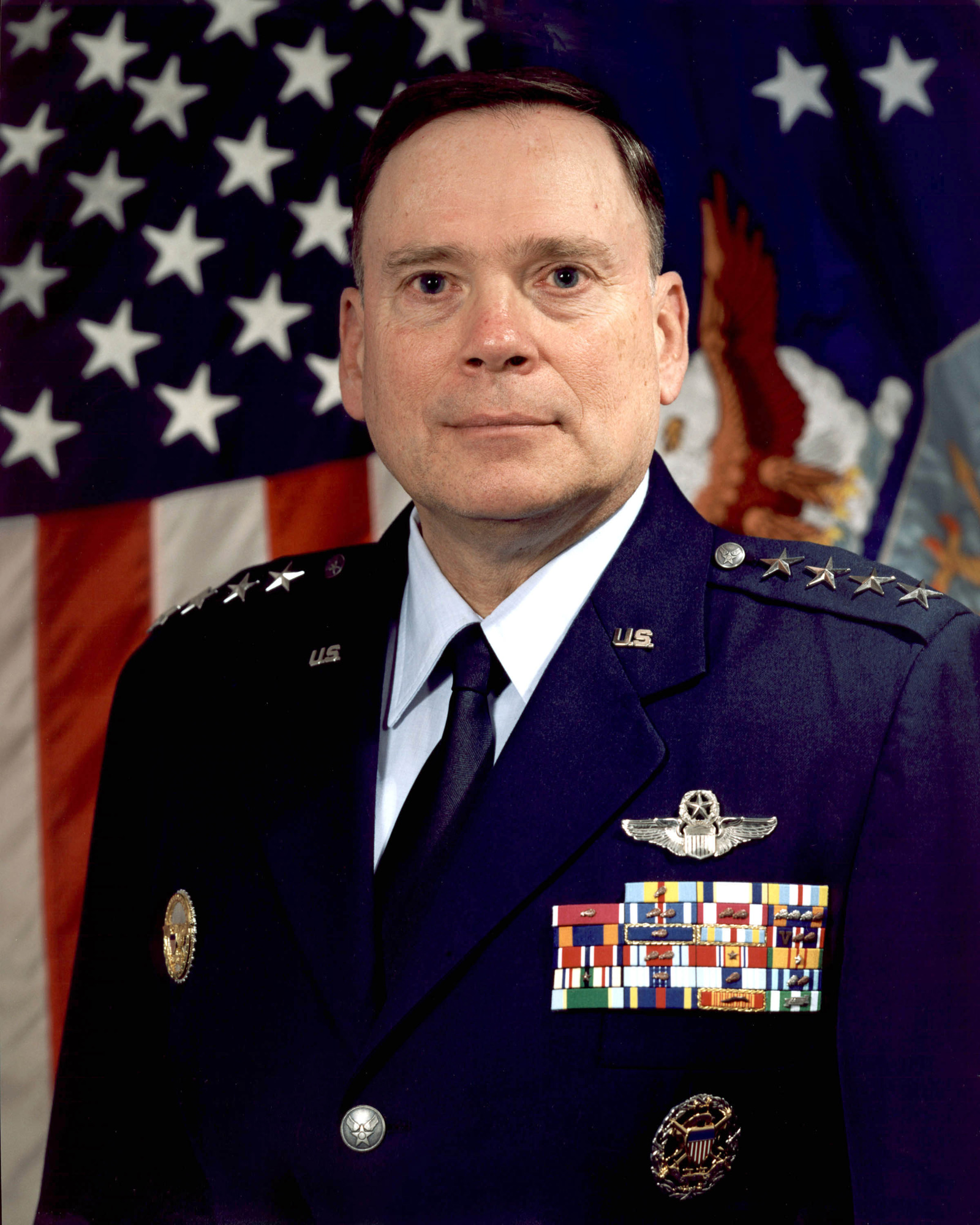
- General John P. Jumper
- Born: February 4, 1945 (age 81); Paris, Texas, U.S.
- Alma mater: Virginia Military Institute (BS); Golden Gate University (MA)
- Spouse: Ellen McGhee (m. 1969)
- Children: 3
- Relatives: Jimmy J. Jumper (father)
- Military career
- Allegiance: United States
- Branch: United States Air Force
- Service years: 1966–2005
- Rank: General
- Unit: 459th Airlift Squadron
- Commands: Chief of Staff of the United States Air Force; Headquarters ACC; Allied Air Forces Central Europe; U.S. Air Forces in Europe; U.S. Central Command Air Forces; Ninth Air Force; 57th Fighter Weapons Wing; 33rd Tactical Fighter Wing; 430th Tactical Fighter Squadron
- Conflicts: See battles: Vietnam War; Tet Offensive; Battle of Khe Sanh; War in Afghanistan
- Awards: Defense Distinguished Service Medal (3); Air Force Distinguished Service Medal (3); Army Distinguished Service Medal; Navy Distinguished Service Medal; Coast Guard Distinguished Service Medal; Defense Superior Service Medal; Legion of Merit (2); Distinguished Flying Cross (3); Meritorious Service Medal (3); Air Medal (18); Legion of Honor
- Other work: CEO of Leidos (2012-2014)

John Phillip Jumper (born February 4, 1945) is a retired United States Air Force (USAF) general, who was 17th chief of staff of the United States Air Force from September 6, 2001 to September 2, 2005. He retired from the USAF on November 1, 2005. Jumper was succeeded as chief of staff by General T. Michael Moseley.

He is the son of major-general Jimmy J. Jumper, USAF. During his career he was a command pilot with more than 5,000 flying hours. He later was the CEO of Leidos from 2012 to 2014.

== Early life ==
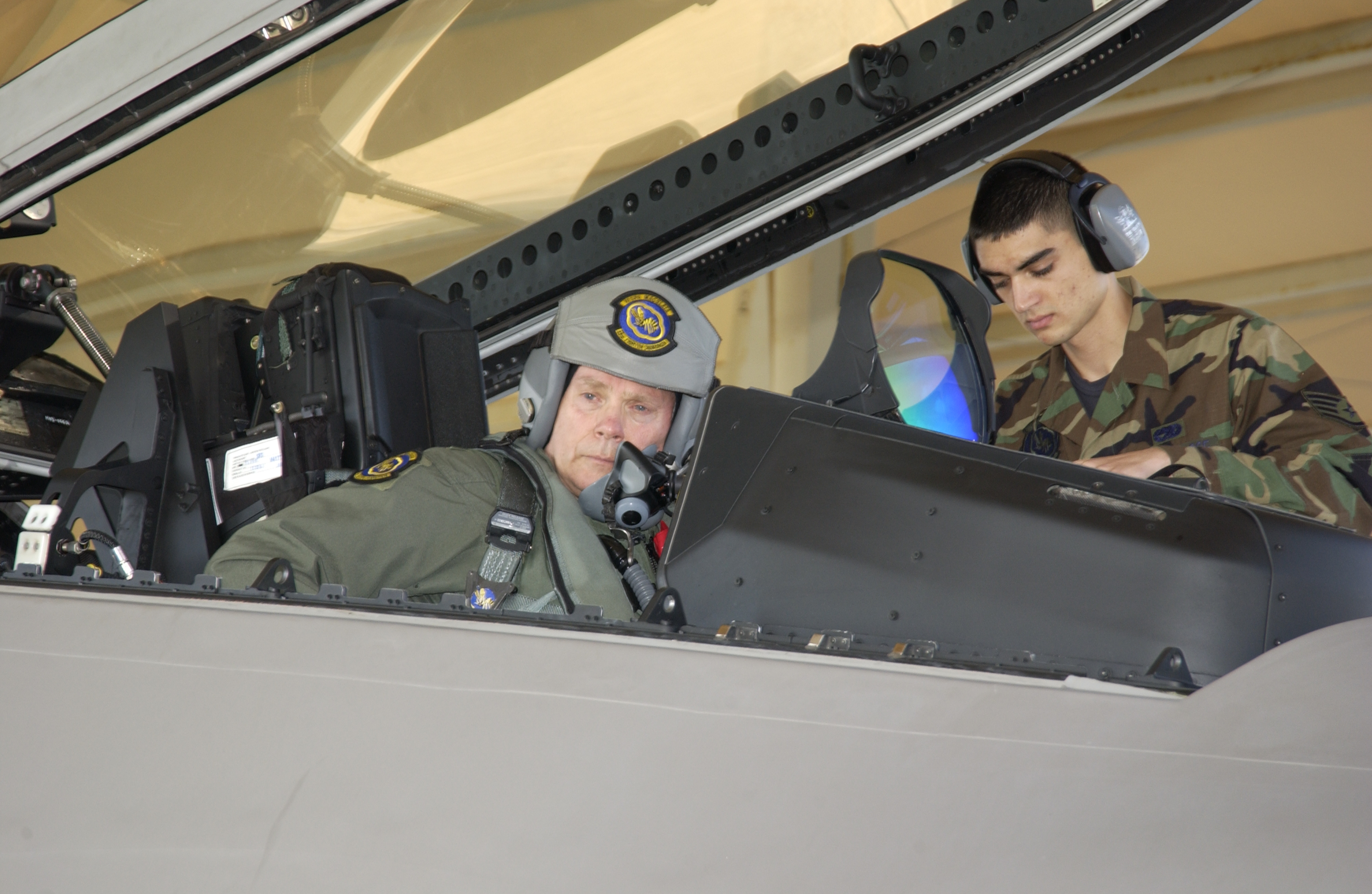
Air Force Chief of Staff General John P. Jumper flies an F-22 Raptor.

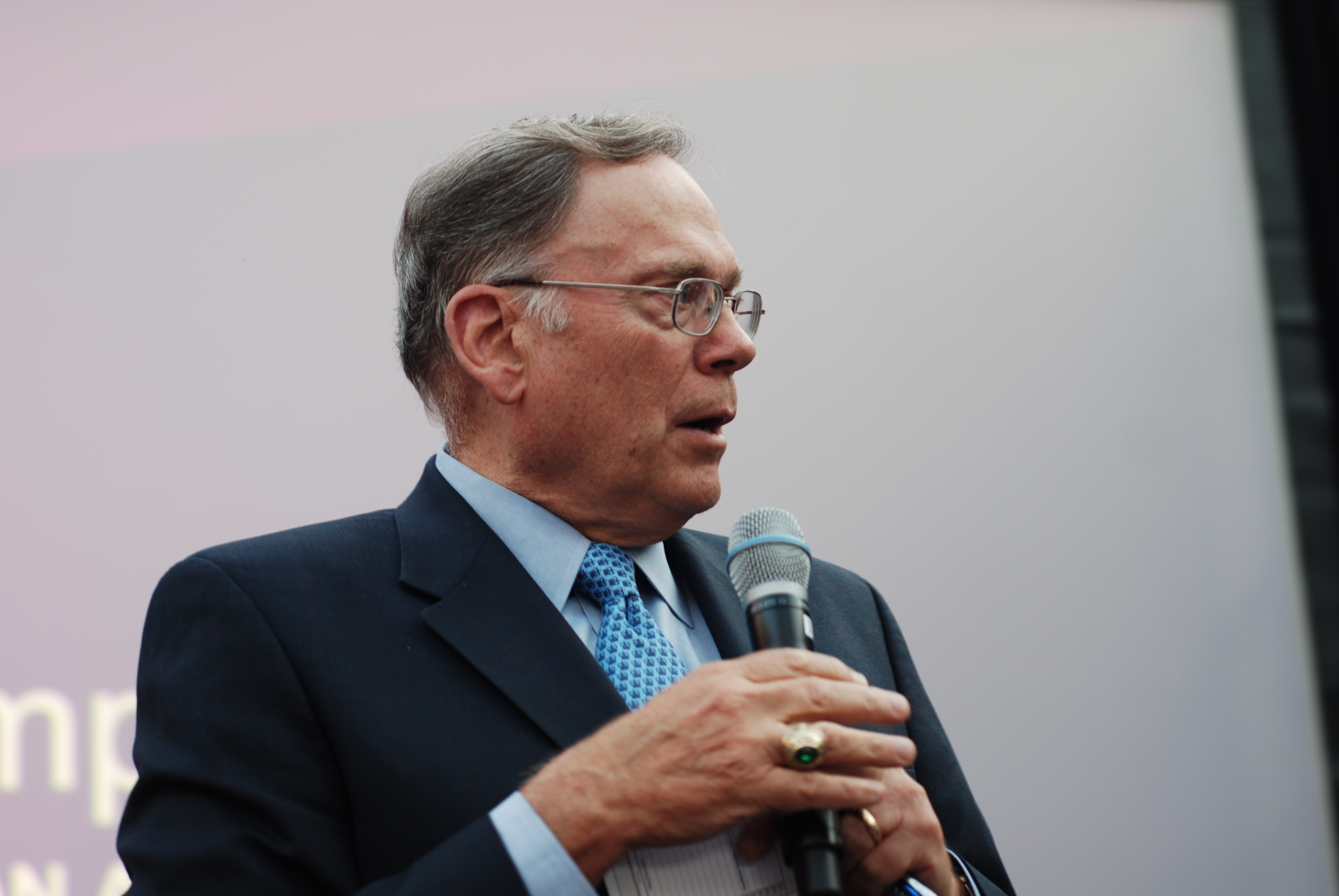
Jumper speaking as a CEO of Leidos, September 2013

John Jumper was born on February 4, 1945 in Paris, Texas. Jumper has stated that his father general Jimmy Jefferson Jumper enlisted in the United States Army Air Forces in World War II "probably for a way to get out of Paris, Texas", became a pilot, and retired as a two star general.

While his father served in the occupation of Japan after World War II, John and his mother once traveled aboard a liberty ship to join his father there. John Jumper's grandfather, Delbert Lee Jumper was a cotton farmer from Paris, Texas and served in the U.S. Navy during World War I. Delbert's brother Samuel Augusta Jumper was also a veteran having served in the U.S. Army. Samuel Jumper was the grandfather of Stephen Franklin Jumper, a U.S. Army soldier who was a purple heart recipient killed in action and whose name is on the Vietnam Veteran's Memorial.

John went on to earn his commission as a distinguished graduate of Virginia Military Institute's Air Force ROTC program in 1966. He has commanded a fighter squadron, two fighter wings, a Numbered Air Force, U.S. Air Forces in Europe and Allied Air Forces Central Europe.

== Education ==
- 1962 Hampton High School (Hampton, Virginia)
- 1966 Bachelor of Science degree in electrical engineering, Virginia Military Institute, Lexington
- 1975 Squadron Officer School, Maxwell AFB, Alabama
- 1978 Air Command and Staff College, Maxwell AFB, Alabama
- 1979 Master of Business Administration degree, Golden Gate University, San Francisco, California
- 1982 National War College, Fort Lesley J. McNair, Washington, D.C.

== Career ==
By October 1967 he was serving in combat operations in Vietnam. He was assigned to the 459th Tactical Airlift Squadron at Phu Cat Air Base and was part of the unit based in Da Nang. In January 1968 during the Tet Offensive he flew missions into Khe Sanh six days a week. He flew in supplies of whole blood and would fly off before being spotted by the North Vietnamese Army. He also transported supplies to special forces units sometimes up to "six or seven hours" a day in twenty minutes stints. He later served in England from 1970 to 1974.

Prior to becoming Chief of Staff of the Air Force, the general served as commander of Air Combat Command at Langley Air Force Base. Jumper has also served at the Pentagon as deputy chief of staff for air and space operations, as the senior military assistant to two secretaries of defense, and as special assistant to the chief of staff for roles and missions. A command pilot with more than 5,000 flying hours, principally in fighter aircraft, Jumper served two tours in Southeast Asia, accumulating more than 1,400 combat hours. Jumper later retired from the Air Force on November 1, 2005.

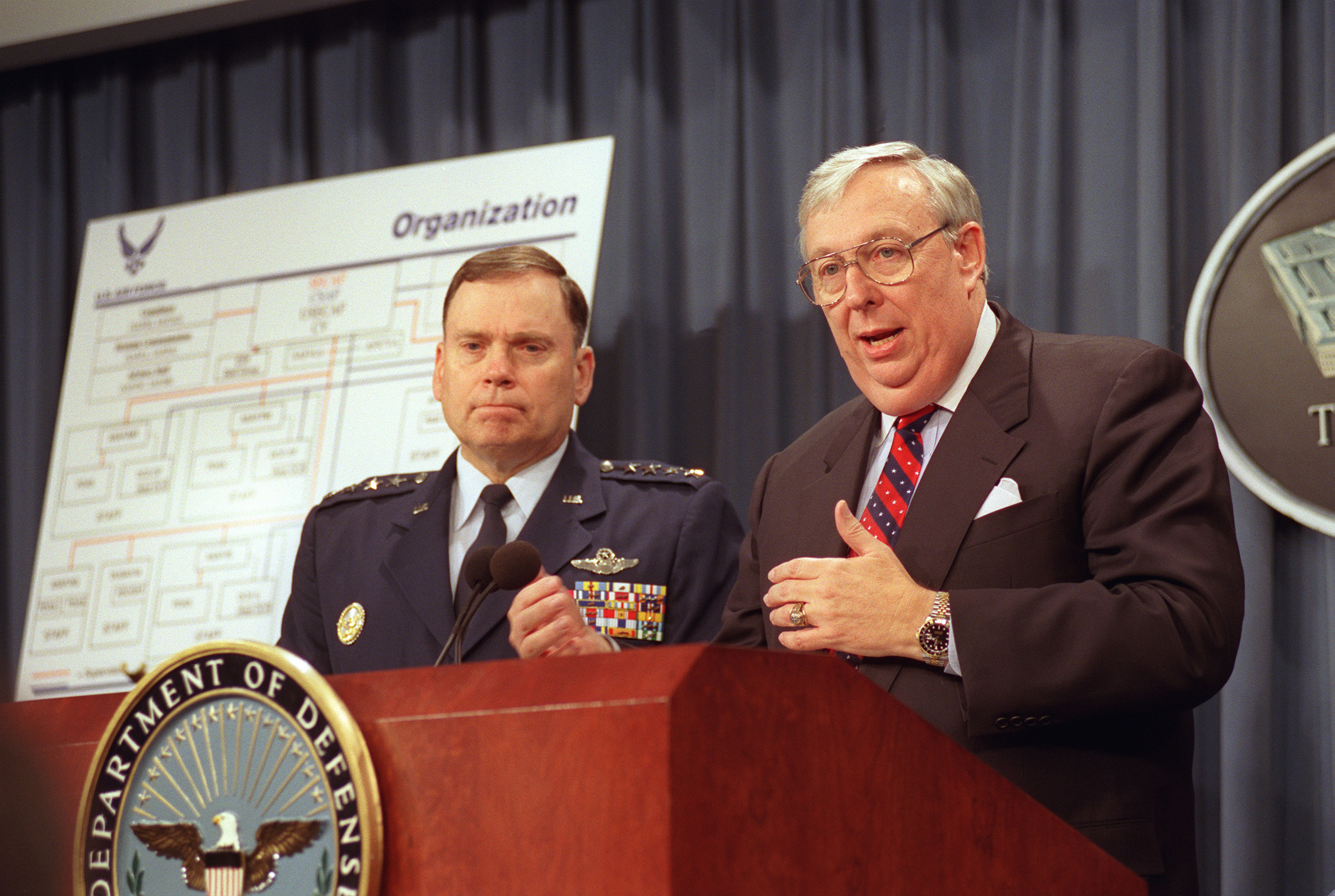
Air Force Chief of Staff General John P. Jumper and Secretary of the Air Force James Roche during a briefing at The Pentagon.

During the 9/11 terrorist attacks he was stationed at the Pentagon having sworn in as Air Force Chief of Staff just five days earlier. By 9:33 am air traffic control warned that a third high jacked airplane was flying off course. Jumper stated in an interview “We knew instantly we were the likely target.” By 9:37 am the plane struck the opposite side of the building and Jumper stated “James Roche was standing at his desk on the telephone looking out his window. I grabbed him by the collar, and as I pulled him into the hallway, the whole building rattled.” Jumper and his staff retreated to the basement command center of the Pentagon to help ensure continuity of the U.S. Government.

On June 7, 2005 Jumper apologized to Senator McCain for internal Air Force emails about the Senator in the context of the tanker lease scandal, calling them "unprofessional and not worthy of a great Air Force".

In June 2007 Jumper joined board of directors of Science Applications International Corporation, a federal contractor company. On March 1, 2012 Jumper became SAIC's CEO and was essential in splitting the company into two. After the split Jumper remained the CEO of the company which changed its name to Leidos. Jumper retired as CEO in July 2014, when Roger Krone succeeded him as the company's new CEO, but Jumper stayed on as chairman of the company's board of directors.

== Personal life ==
Jumper's wife is named Ellen McGhee and they have three daughters Melissa, Catherine, and Janet, all of whom have served in the Air Force.

On November 6, 2022 his daughter Catherine was promoted to brigadier general and Commander of the Virginia National Guard Air Component. John Jumper was the presiding official over the ceremony.

Jumper appeared as himself in the Stargate SG-1 episode "Lost City: Part 2" (S07E22).

== Assignments ==
1. June 1966 – July 1967, student pilot, 3550th Pilot Training Squadron, Moody Air Force Base, Georgia
2. July 1967 – September 1967, C-7 upgrade training, Sewart AFB, Tennessee
3. October 1967 – October 1968, C-7 pilot, 459th Tactical Airlift Squadron, Phu Cat Air Base, South Vietnam
4. November 1968 – July 1969, F-4 upgrade training, 431st Tactical Fighter Squadron, George AFB, California
5. July 1969 – May 1970, instructor pilot, weapons officer and fast forward air controller, 555th Tactical Fighter Squadron, Udon Royal Thai AFB, Thailand
6. June 1970 – July 1974, instructor pilot, flight examiner and standardization and evaluation chief, 81st Tactical Fighter Wing, Royal Air Force Bentwaters, England
7. July 1974 – August 1977, flight instructor, later, flight commander, U.S. Air Force Fighter Weapons School, Nellis Air Force Base, Nevada
8. August 1977 – June 1978, student, Air Command and Staff College, Maxwell Air Force Base, Alabama
9. June 1978 – August 1981, staff officer for operations and readiness, Tactical Division, Headquarters U.S. Air Force, Washington, D.C.
10. August 1981 – July 1982, student, National War College, Fort Lesley J. McNair, Washington, D.C.
11. July 1982 – February 1983, chief of safety, 474th Tactical Fighter Wing, Nellis AFB, Nevada
12. March 1983 – July 1983, commander, 430th Tactical Fighter Squadron, Nellis AFB, Nevada
13. July 1983 – August 1986, special assistant and executive officer to the commander, headquarters Tactical Air Command, Langley AFB, Virginia
14. August 1986 – February 1988, vice commander, later, commander, 33rd Tactical Fighter Wing, Eglin Air Force Base, Florida
15. February 1988 – May 1990, commander, 57th Fighter Weapons Wing, Nellis AFB, Nevada
16. June 1990 – April 1992, deputy director for politico-military affairs, Strategic Plans and Policy Directorate, the Joint Staff, Washington, D.C.
17. May 1992 – February 1994, senior military assistant to the secretary of defense, Washington, D.C.
18. February 1994 – July 1994, special assistant to the Air Force chief of staff for roles and missions, Washington, D.C.
19. August 1994 – June 1996, commander, 9th Air Force and U.S. Central Command Air Forces, Shaw Air Force Base, South Carolina
20. June 1996 – November 1997, deputy chief of staff for air and space operations, Headquarters U.S. Air Force, Washington, D.C.
21. December 1997 – February 2000, commander, U.S. Air Forces in Europe, and commander, Allied Air Forces Central Europe, Ramstein AB, Germany
22. February 2000 – September 2001, commander, Headquarters ACC, Langley Air Force Base, Virginia
23. September 2001 – September 2005, chief of staff, headquarters U.S. Air Force, Washington, D.C.

== Flight information ==
- Rating: Command pilot
- Flight hours: More than 5,000
- Aircraft flown: C-7, C-17, C-20, C-37, T-37, T-38, F-4, F-15, F-16, F-22A and Eurofighter Typhoon.

== Honors ==
The General John P. Jumper Awards for Excellence in Warfighting Integration is named in his honor.

He is in the Virginia Military Institute Air Force ROTC Hall of Fame

On May 18, 2024 Nellis Air Force Base dedicated its new headquarters building in honor of Jumper. It was named the General John P. Jumper Headquarters Complex. During the ceremony retired Air Force General Lori Robinson stated "Today we are honoring a leader, warrior, mentor and visionary — someone who represents the heart and soul of our Air Force".

== Awards and decorations ==
Command Air Force Pilot Badge
Office of the Joint Chiefs of Staff Identification Badge
Office of the Secretary of Defense Identification Badge

Defense Distinguished Service Medal with two bronze oak leaf clusters
Air Force Distinguished Service Medal with two oak leaf clusters
Army Distinguished Service Medal
Navy Distinguished Service Medal
Coast Guard Distinguished Service Medal
Defense Superior Service Medal
Legion of Merit with bronze oak leaf cluster
Distinguished Flying Cross with two bronze oak leaf clusters
Meritorious Service Medal with two bronze oak leaf clusters
Air Medal with three silver and one bronze oak leaf cluster
Air Medal (18th consecutive award of this medal; denotes second ribbon for accouterment spacing)
Presidential Unit Citation (Air Force) with bronze oak leaf cluster
Presidential Unit Citation (Navy)
Joint Meritorious Unit Award
Air Force Outstanding Unit Award with Valor device and two bronze oak leaf clusters
Air Force Organizational Excellence Award with oak leaf cluster
Combat Readiness Medal with two bronze oak leaf clusters
National Defense Service Medal with two bronze service stars
Vietnam Service Medal with silver service star
Southwest Asia Service Medal with bronze service star
Global War on Terrorism Service Medal
Air Force Overseas Short Tour Service Ribbon with bronze oak leaf cluster
Air Force Overseas Long Tour Service Ribbon with bronze oak leaf cluster
Air Force Longevity Service Award with silver and three bronze oak leaf clusters
Small Arms Expert Marksmanship Ribbon
Air Force Training Ribbon
French Legion of Honour, Commandeur Medal
Military Meritorious Service Medal, Singapore
Vietnam Gallantry Cross Unit Award
SICOFAA Legion of Merit, Officer
Vietnam Campaign Medal

- 2000 Air Force Order of the Sword, U.S. Air Forces in Europe (USAFE press release)

== Effective dates of promotion ==
Promotions
Insignia	Rank	Date
	General	November 17, 1997
	Lieutenant General	September 1, 1994
	Major General	February 1, 1992
	Brigadier General	August 1, 1989
	Colonel	October 1, 1985
	Lieutenant Colonel	October 1, 1980
	Major	January 1, 1978
	Captain	June 12, 1969
	First Lieutenant	December 12, 1967
	Second Lieutenant	June 12, 1966

== See also ==
- List of commanders of USAFE

== Notes ==
Military offices
Preceded by Gen. Michael E. Ryan	Chief of Staff of the United States Air Force; 2001–2005	Succeeded by Gen. T. Michael Moseley
