= Jimmy J. Jumper =

U.S. Air Force general (1923–1979)

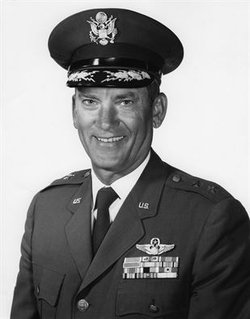
- Air Force General Jimmy Jumper
- Born: January 20, 1923; San Antonio, Texas
- Died: March 9, 1979 (aged 56); Bexar, Texas
- Citizenship: American
- Education: Paris High School
- Occupation: U.S. Air Force Officer
- Children: John P. Jumper
- Military Service
- Allegiance: United States
- Branch: United States Army Air Forces; United States Air Force
- Service years: 1941-1947 (USAAF); 1947-1974 (USAF)
- Rank: Major General
- Conflicts: World War II; Korean War; Vietnam War

James "Jimmy" Jefferson Jumper (20 January 1923 – 9 March 1979) was an American Air Force Major General and the father of 17th Air Force Chief of Staff John P. Jumper. He enlisted in the U.S. Army Air Forces during World War II and became a pilot in 1944. He served as an Air Force officer in the Korean War and Vietnam War before retiring in 1974.

== Early life ==
James "Jimmy" Jefferson Jumper was born on 20 January 1923 in San Antonio, Texas. He was the son of Delbert Lee Jumper a cotton farmer and U.S. Navy veteran of World War One. His uncle Samuel Augusta Jumper was a U.S. Army veteran. He attended Paris High School, Paris, Texas in 1939.

== Career ==
During World War II, he enlisted in the U.S. Army Air Forces in 1941 and by December 1944 he was commissioned as a Second Lieutenant after completing an aviation cadet program at Moore Field, Texas during World War II. He served in the U.S. Occupation of Japan and his son John P. Jumper was born on February 4, 1945.

He served in several positions in the United States and Far East. By June 1951, Jumper served as director of Aircraft Maintenance, Eastern Air Defense Force, Stewart Air Force Base, N.Y. In April 1953, he served as a liaison officer for Air Defense Command. In July 1956, he attended the Air Command and Staff College at Maxwell Air Force Base in Alabama. After graduation I'm July 1957 he was assigned as chief, Maintenance, and commander, 5040th Consolidated Aircraft Maintenance Group, Elmendorf Air Force Base, Alaska.

From July 1960 to July 1961 he attended Air War College, Maxwell Air Force Base, Alabama and became commander, 48th Fighter Interceptor Squadron, which was equipped with F-106 Delta Darts, at Langley Air Force Base, Virginia. Jumper served in the Headquarters Air Defense Command in July 1964 and was a director of operational inspection.

In July 1971, he was sent to the Republic of Vietnam as assistant chief of staff, plans and assumed duties as deputy chief of staff, intelligence, Headquarters Seventh Air Force, Tan Son Nhut Air Base, in December 1971, and as chief, Air Force Advisory Group of Military Assistance Command, Vietnam. He also serves as the adviser to the commander, Vietnamese Air Force, in May 1972. He retired from the Air Force in 1974. Throughout his career he had more than 5,200 flying hours.

== Death ==
He died on March 9, 1979, in Bexar, Texas.

== Awards ==
● Distinguished Service Medal

● Legion of Merit

● Joint Services Commendation Medal

● Air Force Commendation Medal with three oak leaf clusters

● Army Commendation Medal
