= Ronald Fogleman =

Retired US Air Force general

Ronald R. Fogleman
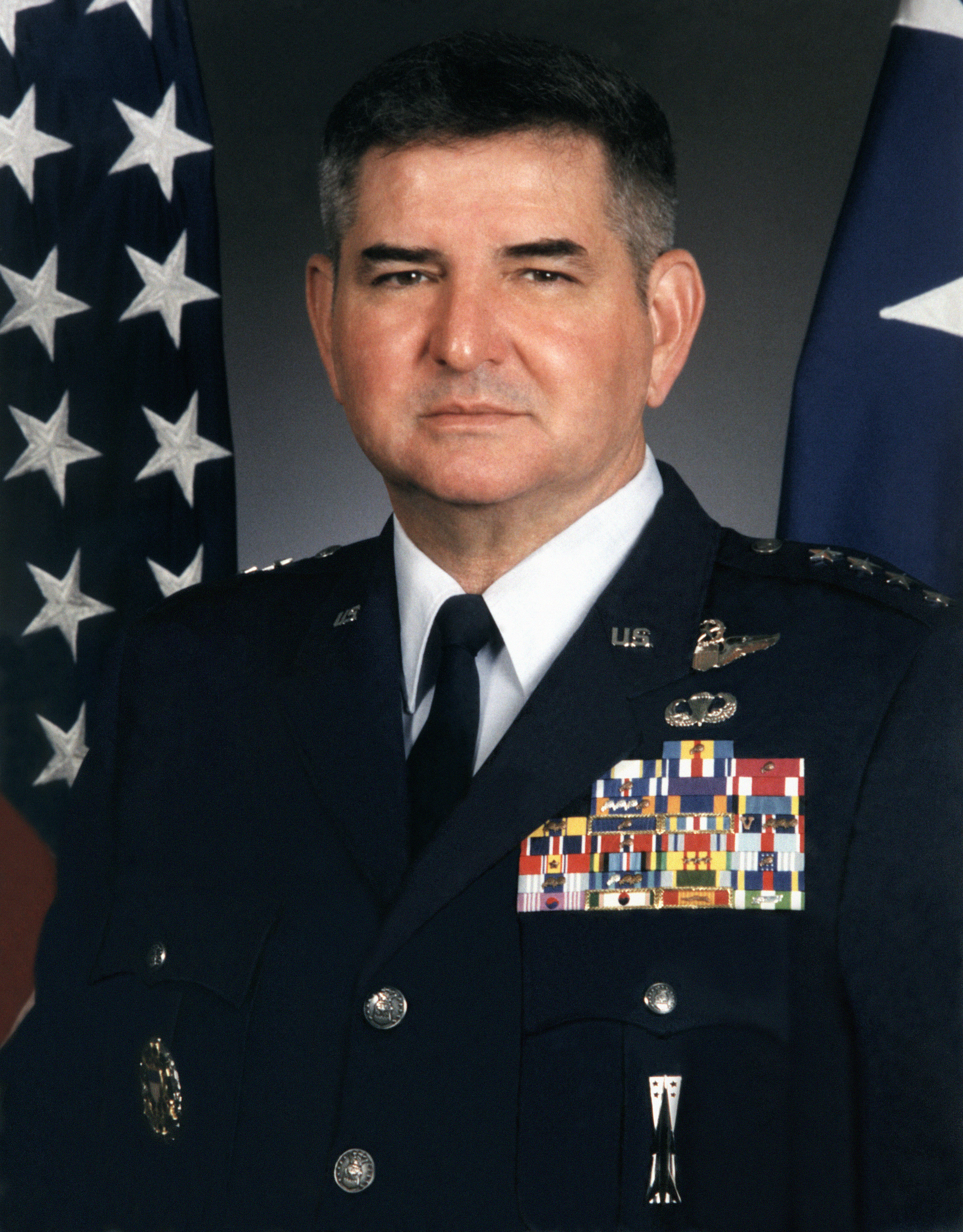
- Born: January 27, 1942 (age 84); Lewistown, Pennsylvania, US
- Military career
- Allegiance: United States
- Branch: United States Air Force
- Service years: 1963–1997
- Rank: General
- Nickname: Ron
- Commands: Chief of Staff of the United States Air Force; United States Transportation Command; Air Mobility Command
- Conflicts: Vietnam War
- Awards: Defense Distinguished Service Medal (3); Air Force Distinguished Service Medal (2); Army Distinguished Service Medal; Navy Distinguished Service Medal; Silver Star; Legion of Merit (2); Distinguished Flying Cross (2); Purple Heart

Ronald Robert Fogleman (born January 27, 1942) is a retired United States Air Force general who served as the 15th Chief of Staff of the Air Force from 1994 to 1997 and as Commanding General of the United States Transportation Command from 1992 to 1994.

== Air Force career ==
A 1963 graduate from the United States Air Force Academy, he holds a master's degree in military history and political science from Duke University. A command pilot and a parachutist, he amassed more than 6,800 flying hours in fighter, transport, tanker and rotary wing aircraft. He flew 315 combat missions and logged 806 hours of combat flying in fighter aircraft. Eighty of his missions during the Vietnam War were as a "Misty FAC" in the F-100F Super Sabre at Phù Cát Air Base, South Vietnam between 25 December 1968 and 23 April 1969.

Fogleman was shot down in Vietnam in 1968, while piloting an F-100. He was rescued by clinging to an AH-1 Cobra attack helicopter that landed at the crash site.

In early assignments he instructed student pilots, performed combat duty as a fighter pilot and high-speed forward air controller in Vietnam and Thailand, taught history at the Air Force Academy and conducted flight operations in Europe—including duty as an F-15 Eagle aircraft demonstration pilot for international airshows. He commanded a USAF wing, an air division, a numbered air force, a major command and a unified combatant command.

Fogleman was the first graduate of the United States Air Force Academy to advance to Chief of Staff of the Air Force. During his tenure, he introduced a simplified code of conduct for airmen, which remains in use today. Called the "Air Force Core Values", the code demands "Integrity First, Service Before Self, and Excellence in All We Do."

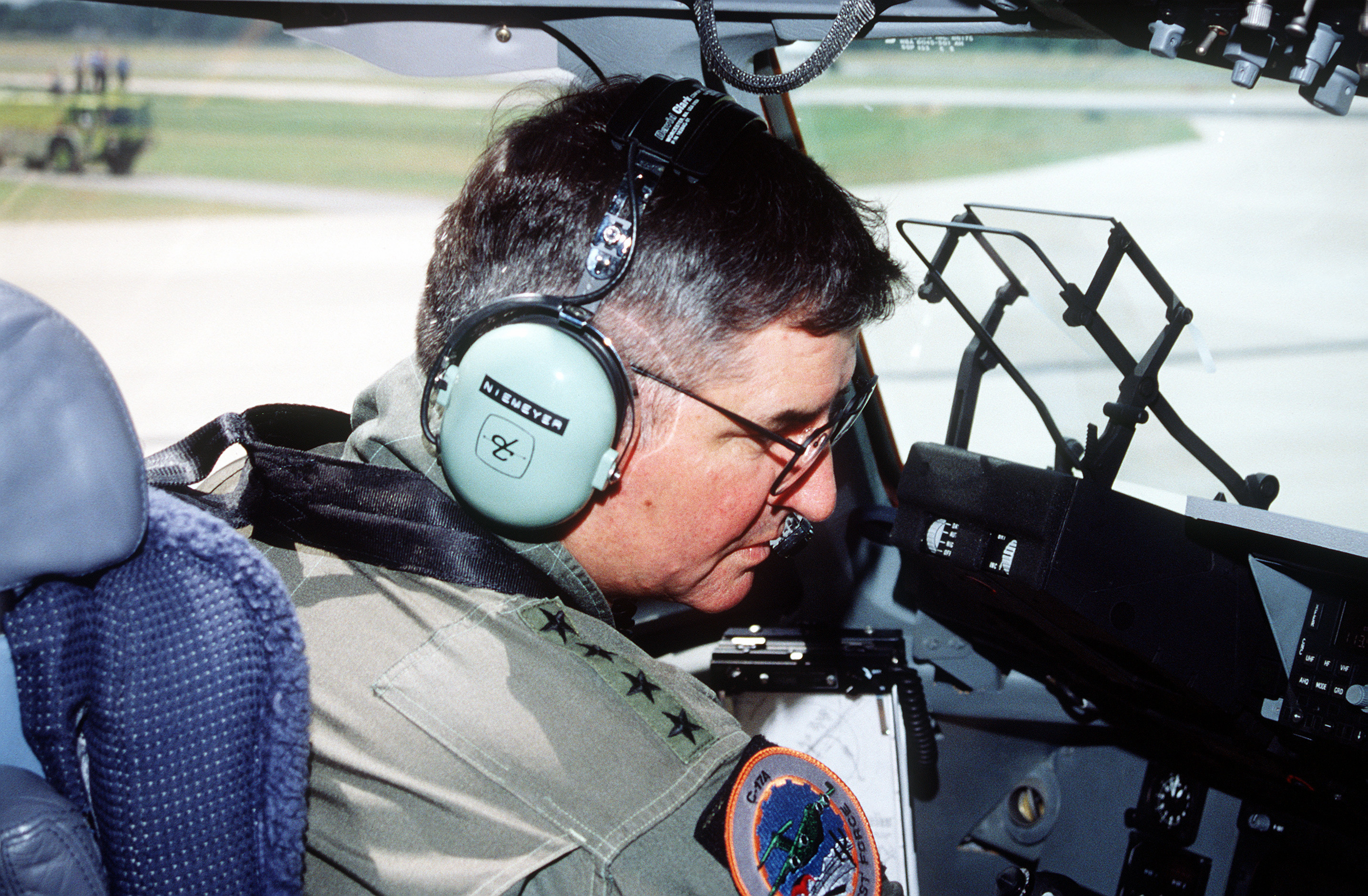
Fogleman in USAF's first Boeing C-17 Globemaster III in 1993.

During the Bosnian War, Fogleman was - in his position as Chief of Staff of the United States Air Force - involved in the planning of a rescue operation of Scott O'Grady, an American pilot who got shot down by Serbian forces in June 1995. Fogleman's decision to share news of the signals that O'Grady had allegedly sent before the rescue operation was complete, led to criticism at the time. Despite Fogleman releasing this "extremely sensitive piece of information", O'Grady was rescued.

In 1996 Fogleman created the Chief of Staff of the US Air Force (CSAF) Professional Reading Program in order to "develop a common frame of reference among Air Force members -- officers, enlisted, and civilians -- to help each of us become better, more effective advocates of air and space power." The list has been enhanced by subsequent CSAF's and includes books by Rolf Dobelli, Simon Sinek, and Victor Davis Hansen.

Fogleman said in a December 1997 interview—published by Aerospace Power Journal in the spring of 2001—that his retirement was to allow the Secretary of Defense to make a decision on the future of Brigadier General Terryl J. Schwalier, the senior officer in Riyadh at the time of the Khobar Towers bombing, on the merits and facts of the case rather than in response to a perceived protest by a service chief. He did not resign in protest over policy; this would have encroached on civilian control of the military.

== Post-Air Force career ==
After his retirement, Fogleman was named to the Boards of Directors of Alliant Techsystems, AAR Corporation, Mesa Air Group, Inc., Tactical Air Support, Inc., World Air Holdings, Inc., and the Tauriga Sciences Inc.'s Business Advisory Board and to the board of advisors of the Code of Support Foundation, a nonprofit military services organization.

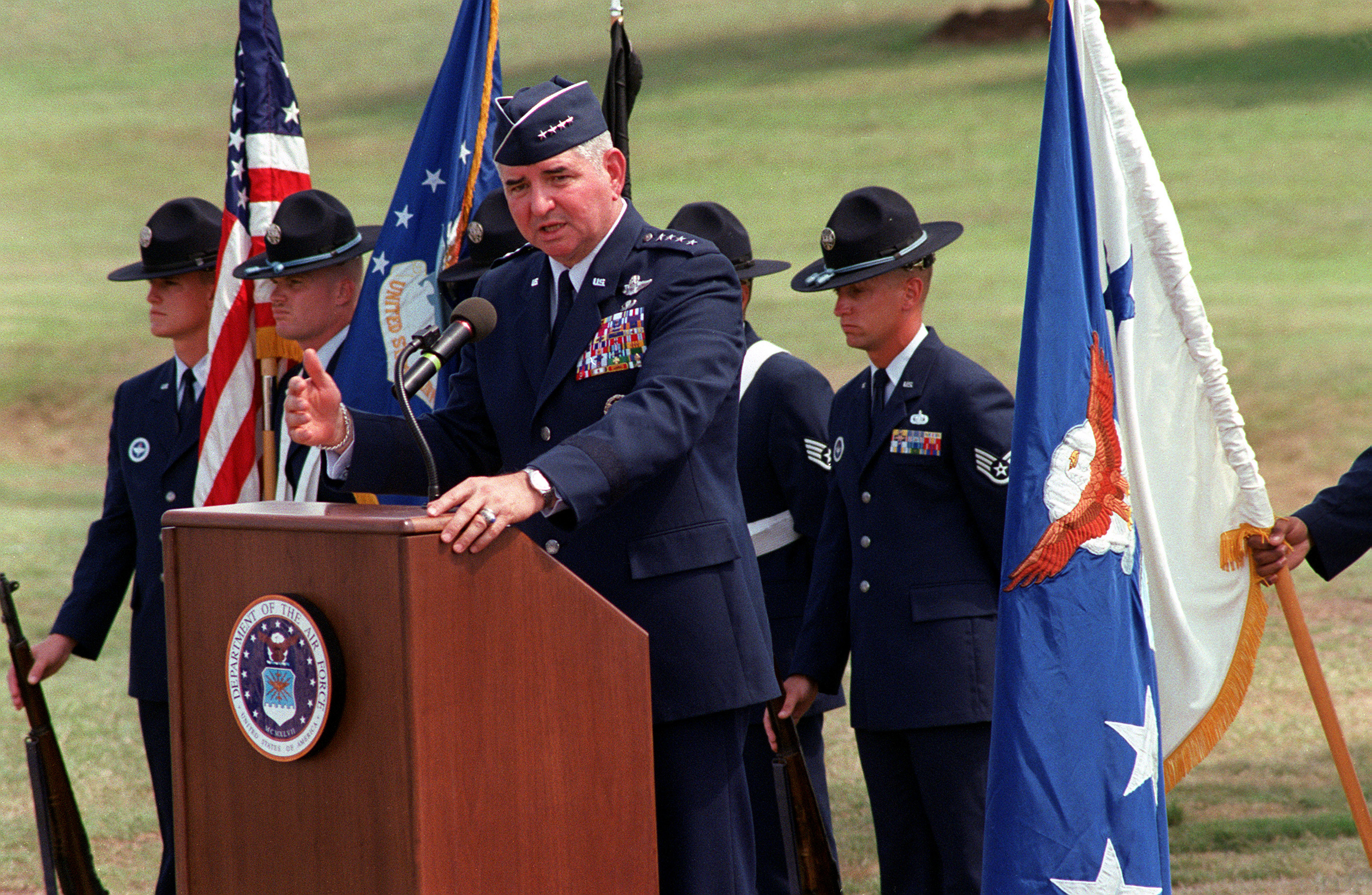
Fogleman speaking at the dedication of the Medal of Honor Monument, Lackland Air Force Base, 1996.

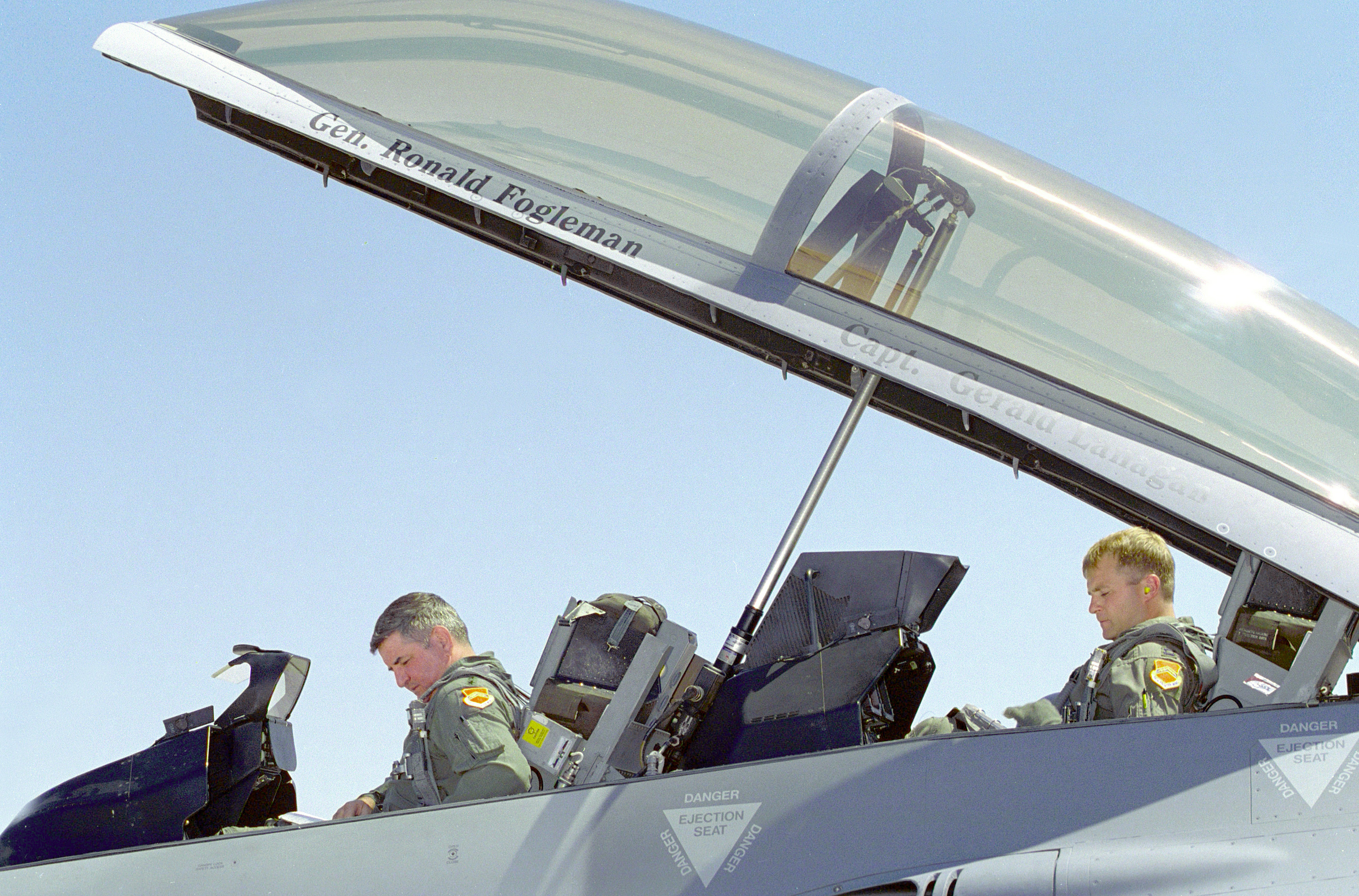
Fogleman preparing to fly a training mission in an F-16 Fighting Falcon, 1995.

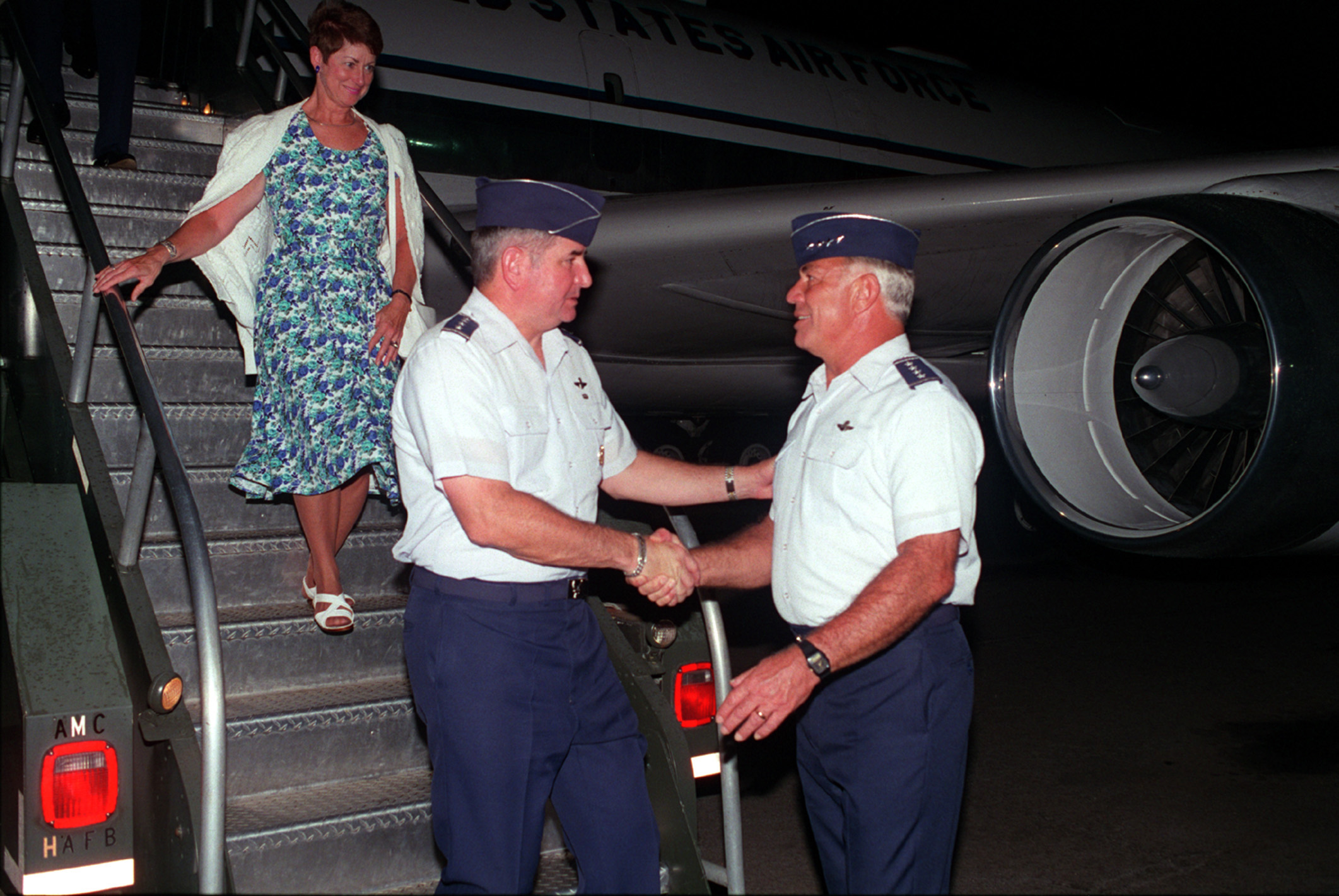
Fogleman arriving in Hawaii for the 50th anniversary of the end of World War II, 1995.

On November 11, 2009, Fogleman was appointed Chairman of the Board of Directors at Alliant Techsystems Inc., following the retirement of ATK Chairman and CEO Dan Murphy.

As a Boeing consultant, Fogleman said that the Lockheed Martin F-35 Lightning II will not be a combat proven aircraft until it receives the Block 3F software in the early 2020s.

In 2018, Fogleman was inducted into the National Aviation Hall of Fame in Dayton, Ohio.

As of 2024, Fogleman serves on the advisory board of the National Security Space Association.

== Awards and decorations ==
| Air Force Command Pilot Badge |
| Basic Parachutist Badge |
| Basic Missile Maintenance Badge |
| Office of the Joint Chiefs of Staff Identification Badge |

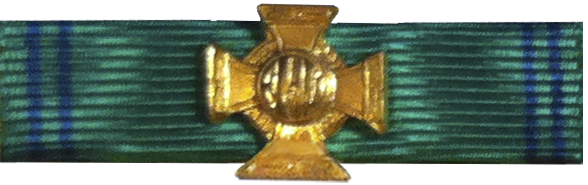
| Defense Distinguished Service Medal with two bronze oak leaf clusters |
| Air Force Distinguished Service Medal with one bronze oak leaf cluster |
| Army Distinguished Service Medal |
| Navy Distinguished Service Medal |
| Silver Star |
| Legion of Merit with one bronze oak leaf cluster |
| Distinguished Flying Cross with one bronze oak leaf cluster |
| Purple Heart |
| Meritorious Service Medal |
| Air Medal with three silver and one bronze oak leaf clusters |
| Air Medal (second ribbon to denote eighteenth award) |
| Aerial Achievement Medal |
| Air Force Commendation Medal with two bronze oak leaf clusters |
| Air Force Presidential Unit Citation with one bronze oak leaf cluster |
| Joint Meritorious Unit Award |
| Air Force Outstanding Unit Award with "V" device and three bronze oak leaf clusters |
| Air Force Outstanding Unit Award (second ribbon to denote fifth award) |
| Air Force Organizational Excellence Award with one bronze oak leaf cluster |
| Combat Readiness Medal |
| Air Force Recognition Ribbon |
| National Defense Service Medal with one bronze service star |
| Armed Forces Expeditionary Medal |
| Vietnam Service Medal with three bronze service stars |
| Air Force Overseas Short Tour Service Ribbon with one bronze oak leaf cluster |
| Air Force Overseas Long Tour Service Ribbon with two bronze oak leaf clusters |
| Air Force Longevity Service Award with one silver and two bronze oak leaf clusters |
| Small Arms Expert Marksmanship Ribbon |
| Air Force Training Ribbon |
| Order of National Security Merit, Gugseon Medal, Republic of Korea |
| Knight Grand Cross (First Class) of the Most Noble Order of the Crown of Thailand |
| Grand Cordon, First Class, Order of the Rising Sun, Japan |
| Royal Order of the Polar Star, Commander First Class, Sweden |
| Legion of Honor, with the rank of Commander, France |
| Venezuelan Air Force Cross |
| Korean Presidential Unit Citation |
| Republic of Vietnam Gallantry Cross Unit Citation |
| SICOFAA Legion of Merit Medal, Grand Cross, System of Cooperation Among the American Air Forces |
| Vietnam Campaign Medal |

In 2013 he was inducted into the Airlift/Tanker Association Hall of Fame.

Military offices
| Preceded by Merrill McPeak | Chief of Staff of the Air Force; 1994–1997 | Succeeded by Michael E. Ryan |
