= James Richard Curry =

American serial killer

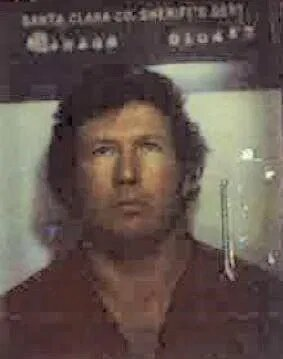
- Mugshot taken after Curry's arrest
- Born: November 16, 1946; Bexar, Texas, U.S.
- Died: January 7, 1983 (aged 36); San Jose, California, U.S.
- Cause of death: Suicide by hanging
- Convictions: Robbery; Assault
- Penalty: 20 years

Details
- Victims: 4–5
- Span of crimes: 1982 – 1983 (confirmed); 1978 – 1983 (suspected)
- Country: United States
- States: California, Nevada
- Date apprehended: January 4, 1983

James Richard Curry (November 16, 1946 – January 7, 1983) was an American serial killer and rapist who killed between four and five people in California and Nevada from 1982 to 1983. A few days after his arrest, Curry hanged himself in his cell. He was posthumously determined to be the killer of the Sheep's Flat Jane Doe, who was identified alongside him as Mary Silvani.

== Early life and crimes ==
Little is known about Curry's early life. Born in Bexar, Texas on November 16, 1946, he was the illegitimate son of a man and woman from Dallas who had an affair, with only his mother deciding to raise him under a different name. Sometime during the late 1960s to early 1970s, he was arrested for robbery and assault and sentenced to 20 years imprisonment at the Huntsville Unit, where he remained until his release in 1977. Curry then decided to leave Texas and move to California, settling in the small community of Waukena, where he soon found employment in a locksmithing company.

== Murders ==
While working in Waukena, Curry became acquainted with a 40-year-old fellow locksmith named James DeWitt Robinson. He learned that Robinson had received $10,000 as settlement from a 1976 personal injury lawsuit and had done property dealings in Tulare, leading some to speculate that Curry wanted to steal his money. Sometime in 1978, Robinson vanished without a trace and has still not been found to this day, but since he was not reported missing at the time, his disappearance was not investigated by the authorities.

Sometime during the following four years, Curry purchased a self-storage yard in Santa Clara, where he would store some items stolen from his future victims. Through this business, he came into contact with 38-year-old Richard Lemmon Jr., a Bakersfield native who wanted to store his two motorcycles, a truck, and other belongings in one of the storage lockers. The men had a cordial relationship, but sometime around early 1982, Curry had a falling out with him and decided to kill him. On February 17, he lured Lemmon to the storage locker and shot him once in the head with a .38 revolver. After killing him, he stuffed his body in a wooden crate, sealed it, and left it in the storage locker. Curry would later give Lemmon's motorcycle to one of his sons.

On July 17, under as of yet unclear circumstances, Curry encountered 33-year-old Mary Edith Silvani somewhere in Washoe County, Nevada, whereupon he proceeded to sexually assault and then kill her by shooting her in the back of the head. Silvani's body was then dumped along the Sheep's Flat hiking trail near Incline Village, where it was soon found by hikers. Due to the fact that there was no ID or any personal items left near the body, coroners were unable to establish either the victim's or the killer's identities. Named "Sheep's Flat Jane Doe", her case garnered notoriety in the area over the years due to the mysterious circumstances surrounding it.

Through the operation of his business, Curry became acquainted with 39-year-old Gerald and 34-year-old Sharon K. Novoselatz, a couple who owned a rival self-storage facility. Curry would later claim that his dispute with them stemmed from a 1981 Christmas party, when he alleged that a drunken Gerald was being rude and obnoxious and that he had criticized his business. On January 2, 1983, Curry went to the Novoselatzes' apartment in San Jose, as Gerald wanted to purchase a .45 revolver from him. When he began inquiring on how to handle the weapon, Curry took it, aimed it at Gerald, and shot him once in the head, killing him on the spot. He then stole $400 from the apartment, raped Sharon, and forced her into his yellow Lincoln Continental, in which he planned to drive to the San Francisco International Airport. He planned to put her on a random plane. However, while traveling to the airport, Curry stopped the car along State Route 92 to relieve himself - at that time, Sharon attempted to run away but was chased down by Curry. After he captured her, he proceeded to sexually assault and then shoot her in the head, leaving her body near the Crystal Springs Reservoir.

== Arrest and suicide ==
Two days after the murders, Curry was arrested on suspicion of killing the Novoselatzes after voluntarily appearing for questioning. While he was being interrogated at the Santa Clara County Jail, authorities obtained a search warrant for Curry's self-storage unit, where they found Lemmon's decomposing body stuffed in the crate. When queried, he confessed to the three murders to Det. Sgt. Robert Morse, after which he asked Morse to shoot him.

On January 6, while incarcerated at the Santa Clara County Jail to await further charges, Curry made a makeshift noose from a mattress cover and attempted to hang himself. A prison volunteer distributing books to the inmates found him and quickly reported it to the commanding officer, who attempted to resuscitate him without success. Curry was then taken to the San Jose Hospital and placed in the intensive care unit, where he was kept on life support and under constant surveillance. In the meantime, authorities began to search various records lockers associated with Curry in an attempt to potentially uncover further incriminating evidence. During one of these searches they discovered a handgun, IDs and old checkbooks belonging to James Robinson, but as they were unable to find his remains, they were unable to conclusively determine whether they were just stolen from Robinson or that he was killed and then robbed by Curry.

On January 7, doctors at the San Jose Hospital decided to disconnect Curry's life support after determining that his vital signs were too faint for any sort of recovery. He was pronounced dead at 7:30 PM, with his cause of death ruled as suicide by hanging.

== Identification and closure of the Silvani case ==
While his crimes were quickly forgotten after his suicide, the case of the Sheep's Flat Jane Doe became a primary focus of local and regional law enforcement, who attempted to uncover the victim's identity for decades. Sometime in the mid-2010s, criminalists from the Washoe County Sheriff's Forensic Science Division attended a lecture on genetic genealogy hosted by Dr. Colleen Fitzpatrick, a geneticist known for her work with the DNA Doe Project and Identifinders International. Following this, detectives and criminalists started working with the organizations in an attempt to identify the Sheep's Flat Jane Doe.

After providing a sample of the victim's DNA, it was uploaded to GEDmatch, where geneticists were able to track down Silvani's parents and positively confirm that she was the murder victim after they linked her fingerprints to a 1974 misdemeanor arrest in Detroit, Michigan. In the same press release announcing her identification, authorities also announced that they had linked Curry's DNA to the perpetrator's thanks to the cooperation of his two children, officially closing the case.

== See also ==
- List of serial killers in the United States
- DNA Doe Project
- GEDmatch
