= Charlie Jackson (defensive back) =

American football player (1936–2021)

No. 22, 40
- Position: Defensive back

Personal information
- Born: March 3, 1936; Paris, Texas, U.S.
- Died: May 15, 2021 (aged 85); Paris, Texas, U.S.
- Listed height: 5 ft 11 in (1.80 m)
- Listed weight: 180 lb (82 kg)

Career information
- High school: Paris
- College: Southern Methodist (1954–1957)
- NFL draft: 1958: 13th round, 146th overall pick

Career history
- Chicago Cardinals (1958); Dallas Texans (1960)

Career NFL/AFL statistics
- Interceptions: 1
- Return yards: 10
- Stats at Pro Football Reference

Charles Robert Jackson (March 3, 1936 – May 15, 2021) was an American professional football defensive back who played one season with the Chicago Cardinals of the National Football League (NFL). He was selected by the Cardinals in the 13th round of the 1958 NFL draft. He played college football at Southern Methodist University. Jackson was also a member of the Dallas Texans of the American Football League (AFL).

== Early life ==
Charles Robert Jackson was born on March 3, 1936, in Paris, Texas. He attended Paris High School in Paris.

== College career ==
Jackson was a member of the SMU Mustangs from 1954 to 1957 and a two-year letterman from 1956 to 1957. He rushed 97 times for 571 yards and four touchdowns in 1956 while also catching seven passes for 124 yards and one touchdown. In 1957, he totaled 42 carries for 234 yards and one touchdown, and 18 receptions for 257 yards. Jackson also participated in track and field for SMU.

== Professional career ==
Jackson was selected by the Chicago Cardinals in the 13th round, with the 146th overall pick, of the 1958 NFL draft. He played in 11 games, starting four, for the Cardinals in 1958, recording one interception and two punt returns for 10 yards. He was released in 1959.

Jackson signed with the Dallas Texans of the American Football League (AFL) in 1960, and played three games for the team during their inaugural 1960 season. He was released by the Texans in 1960.

== Personal life ==
Jackson started Jackson Concrete in the Dallas area and grew the company to seven plants. He was also a bird hunter and was inducted into the Bird Dog Hall of Fame in 2005.

Jackson was the older brother of former Dallas Texans and Kansas City Chiefs running back/wide receiver, Frank Jackson. He died from complications of COVID-19 in Paris, Texas, on May 15, 2021, at the age of 85.
