= Paris Independent School District =

School district in Texas

Paris Independent School District is a public school district based in Paris, Texas, United States. It is a UIL region 4A district, and is the largest in Lamar County, with an enrollment of approximately 4,000 students.

In 2009, the school district was rated "academically acceptable" by the Texas Education Agency. In 2022, the district was rated to have "met requirements"

In 2021, the district had approximately 3,900 students. In August 2021 Paris ISD, during the COVID-19 pandemic in Texas, altered its dress code so students were required to wear masks in an attempt to circumvent Governor Greg Abbott's decision that school districts cannot require masks. In September of that year, a court in the county issued a temporary restraining order against the mask aspect.

== Schools ==
- Paris High School (Grades: 9–12)
- Paris Junior High (Grades: 7–8)
- Crockett Intermediate School (Grades: 5–6)
- Aikin Elementary School (Grades: K-4)
- Justiss Elementary School (Grades: K-4)
- Givens Elementary School (Grades: Prekindergarten)
- Travis High School of Choice (Alternate education)

== Notable faculty ==
- Marsha Farney, a Republican member of the Texas House of Representatives from District 20 in Williamson County, is a former counselor at Paris High School
