= Michael E. Ryan =

Chief of Staff of the US Air Force

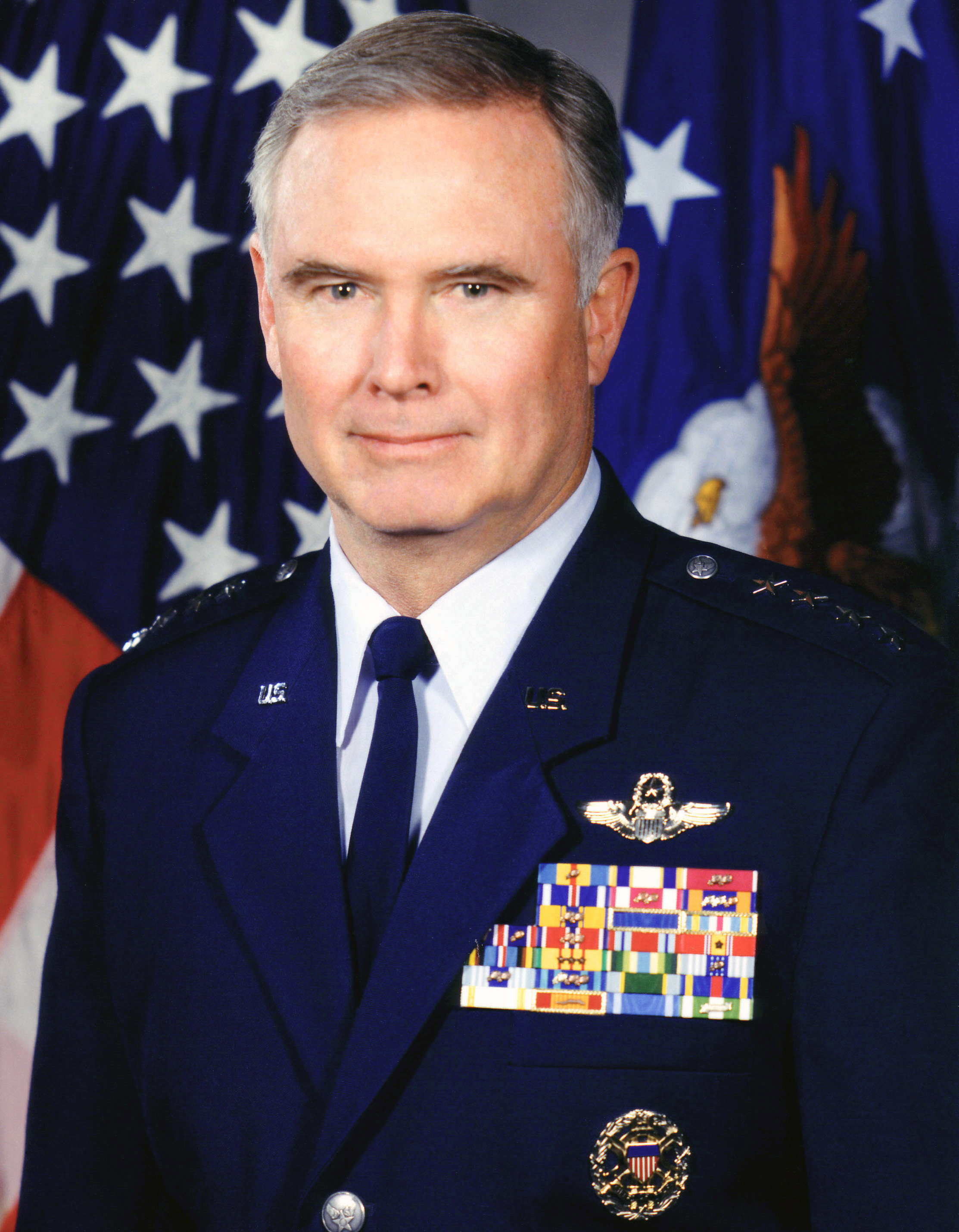
- Official portrait as Chief of Staff of the Air Force
- Born: December 24, 1941 (age 84); San Antonio, Texas, U.S.
- Relatives: General John Dale Ryan (father)
- Military career
- Allegiance: United States
- Branch: United States Air Force
- Service years: 1965–2001
- Rank: General
- Commands: Chief of Staff of the United States Air Force; Allied Air Forces Central Europe; U.S. Air Forces in Europe; 16th Air Force; Allied Air Forces Southern Europe; 432nd Tactical Fighter Wing; 61st Tactical Fighter Squadron
- Conflicts: Vietnam War; United States invasion of Panama; Operation Deliberate Force
- Awards: Defense Distinguished Service Medal (3); Air Force Distinguished Service Medal (2); Army Distinguished Service Medal; Navy Distinguished Service Medal; Coast Guard Distinguished Service Medal; Legion of Merit (3); Distinguished Flying Cross; Full list

Michael Edward Ryan (born December 24, 1941) is a retired United States Air Force (USAF) general and was the 16th Chief of Staff of the United States Air Force from October 1997 to September 2001. He served as the senior uniformed USAF officer responsible for the organization, training and equipage of active-duty, Guard, Reserve and civilian forces serving in the United States and overseas. As a member of the Joint Chiefs of Staff, he and the other service chiefs functioned as military advisers to the Secretary of Defense, National Security Council and the President.

== Military career ==
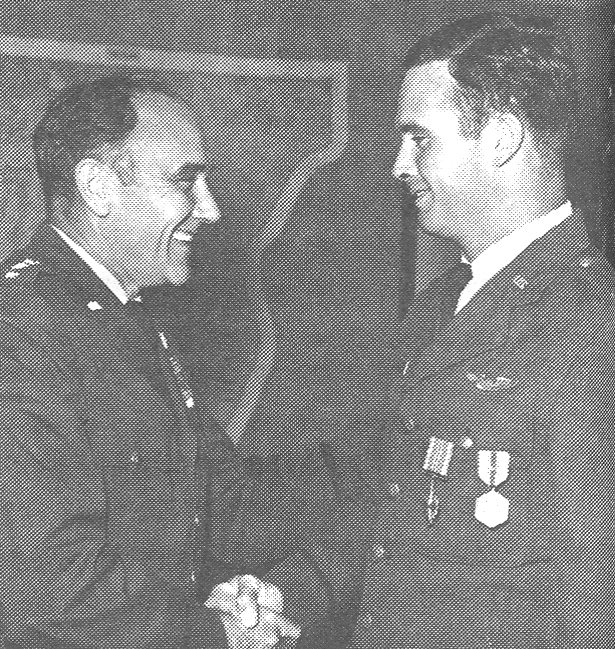
Captain Michael E. Ryan receiving the Distinguished Flying Cross from his father, General John D. Ryan in 1969.

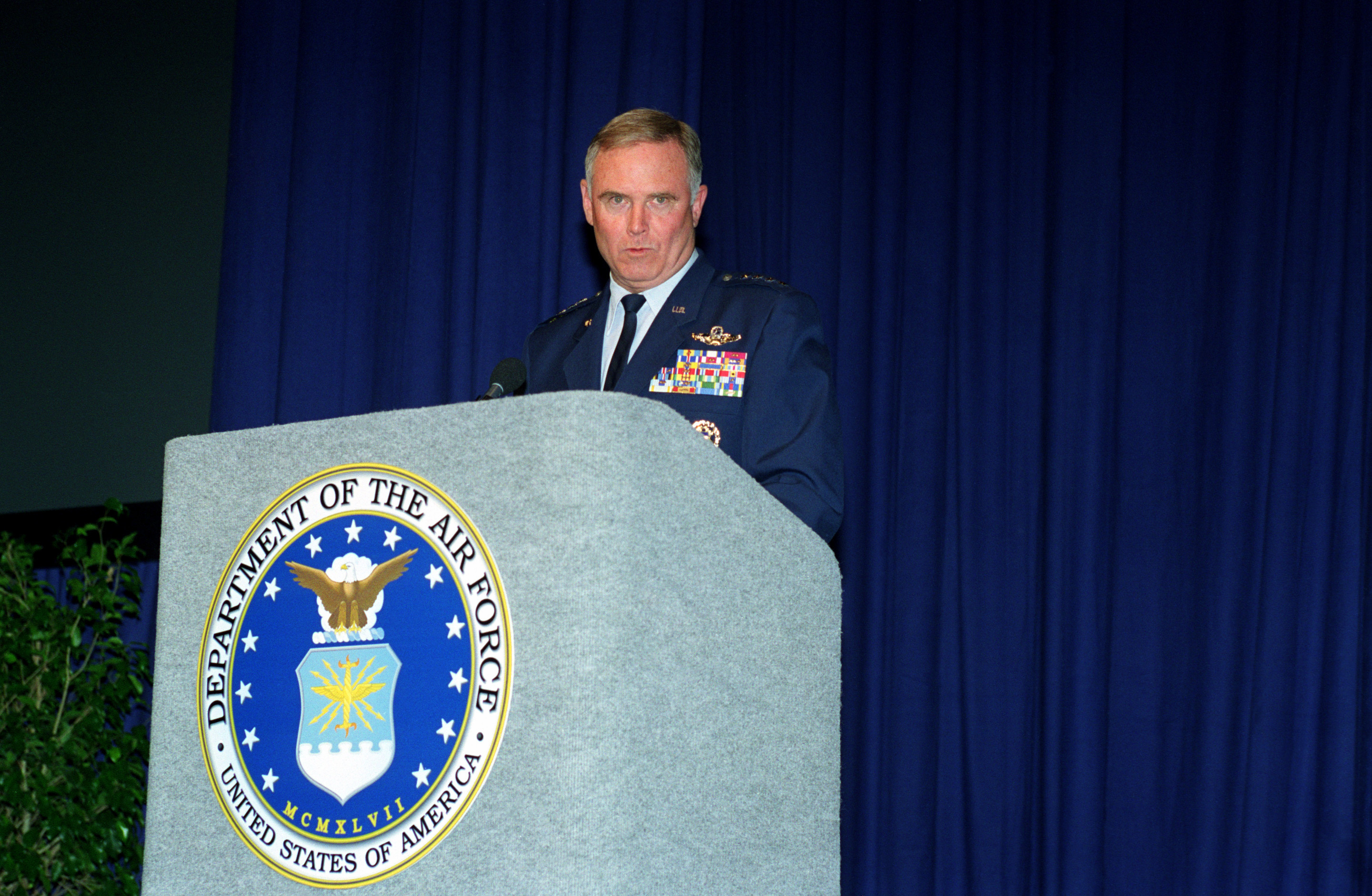
General Michael E. Ryan during his tenure as Air Force Chief of Staff.

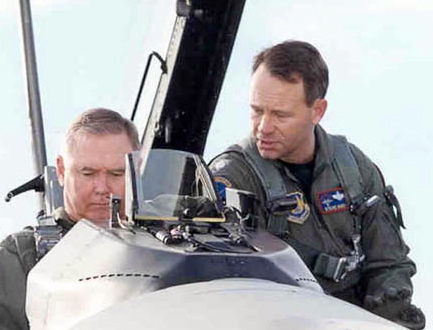
Air Force Chief of Staff General Michael E. Ryan flies an F-16 Fighting Falcon.

Born in San Antonio, Texas in 1941, Ryan entered the U.S. Air Force after graduating from the United States Air Force Academy in 1965; he was a graduate of Omaha Creighton Prep High School. Ryan's father, General John Dale Ryan, was the 7th Chief of Staff of the United States Air Force, from 1969 to 1973.

He flew combat missions in Southeast Asia, including 100 missions over North Vietnam in the F-4 Phantom II, as part of the 13th Tactical Fighter Squadron based at Udorn Royal Thai Air Force Base in Thailand from October 1967 to August 1968. He went through Squadron Officer School in 1969 and the Fighter Weapons Instructor Course at the USAF Fighter Weapons School during 1970. From 1971 to 1973, Ryan served as an exchange officer with the Royal Australian Air Force flying the Mirage III. He attended Air Command and Staff College and earned an MBA from Auburn University in 1976. Ryan went to the National War College in 1984. During 1988, Ryan partook in the National Security Program at John F. Kennedy School of Government at Harvard University.

Over his career, Ryan held command at the squadron, wing, numbered air force and major command levels. He also served in staff assignments at the major command level, and in the Pentagon on both the Air Staff and the Joint Staff.

His first assignment as a lieutenant general in 1993 was as the Assistant to the Chairman of the Joint Chiefs of Staff, the duties of which encompassed being the senior military liaison over at the U.S. Department of State and travelling overseas with the Secretary of State.

As Commander of Sixteenth Air Force at Aviano Air Base and Allied Air Forces Southern Europe in Naples, from 1994 to 1996, Lieutenant General Ryan directed the NATO air combat operations in Bosnia-Herzegovina, including the bombing missions of Operation Deliberate Force, which created the context for the U.S. to broker the Dayton Peace Accords between the parties in conflict. Ryan personally approved every NATO target during the two-week Operation Deliberate Force campaign. During his tenure, USAF captain Scott O'Grady was shot down in an F-16 Fighting Falcon in early June 1995 over Bosnia by a surface-to-air missile launched by the Army of Republika Srpska. O'Grady was rescued a week later.

Before assuming the Chief of Staff position, General Ryan was from April 1996 to October 1997 dual-hatted as Commander of U.S. Air Forces in Europe and Commander of Allied Air Forces Central Europe, with headquarters at Ramstein Air Base in Germany. President Bill Clinton announced the nomination of General Ryan as Chief of Staff of the Air Force on July 31, 1997.

During Operation Allied Force in April 1999, General Ryan made taskings to improve the capability of the Predator drone to collect time-sensitive intelligence for targeting, the results of which would later prove useful in Operation Enduring Freedom. General Ryan formally retired from the U.S. Air Force on October 1, 2001: although the first day on the job of his successor, General John P. Jumper, was on September 11, 2001.

== Awards and decorations ==
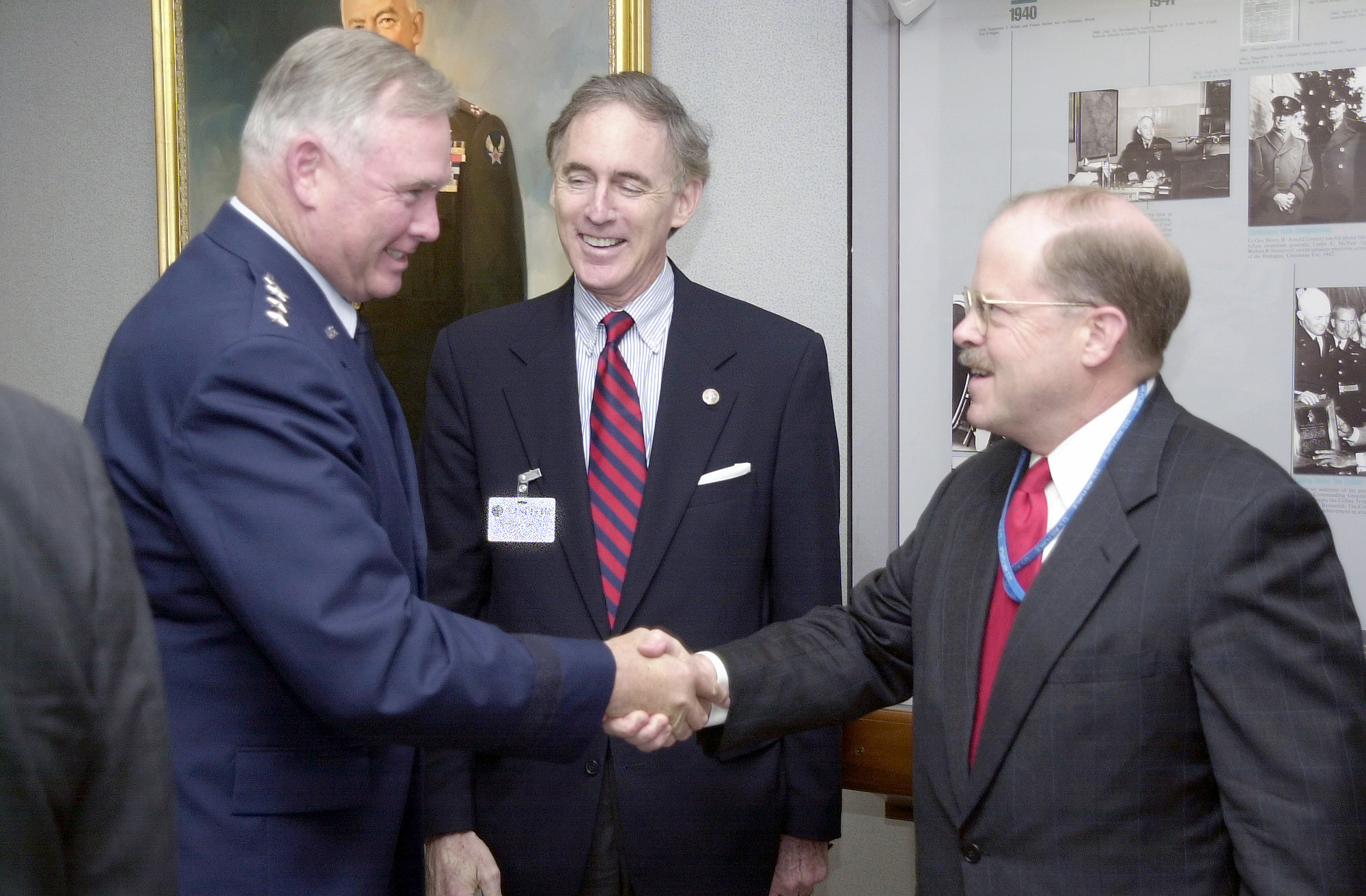
Air Force Chief of Staff General Michael E. Ryan with Secretary of the Air Force F. Whitten Peters at The Pentagon in 2001.

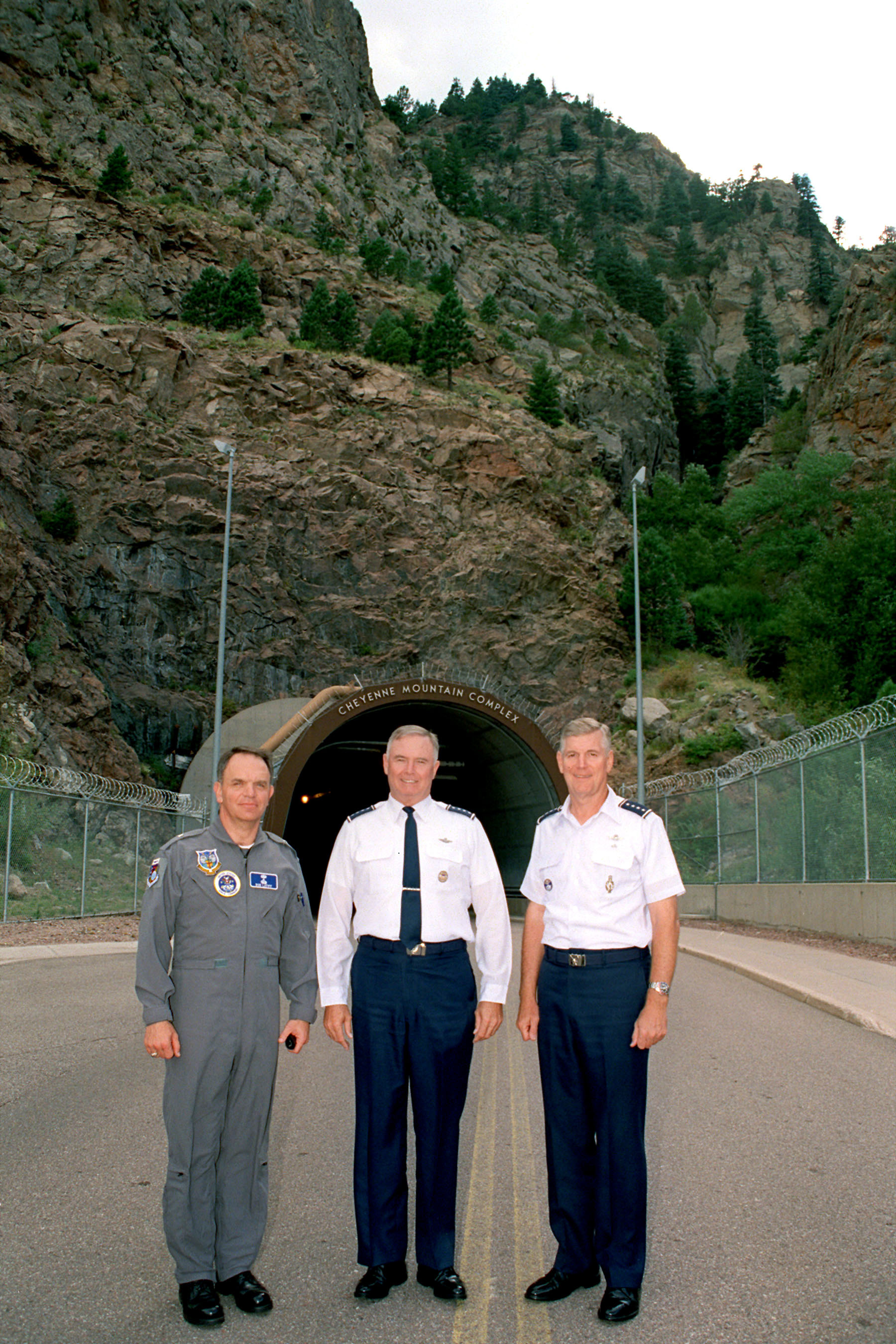
General Michael E. Ryan with Brigadier General Robert Latiff (commander of Cheyenne Mountain Operations Center) and General Richard B. Myers (CINCNORAD/USCINCSPACE/COMAFSPC) standing outside the North portal at Cheyenne Mountain Complex on September 1, 1999.

Other accoutrements
Command Air Force Pilot Badge
Office of the Joint Chiefs of Staff Identification Badge

Personal decorations
	Defense Distinguished Service Medal with two bronze oak leaf clusters
	Air Force Distinguished Service Medal with bronze oak leaf cluster
	Army Distinguished Service Medal
	Navy Distinguished Service Medal
	Coast Guard Distinguished Service Medal
Width-44 crimson ribbon with a pair of width-2 white stripes on the edges	Legion of Merit with two bronze oak leaf clusters
	Distinguished Flying Cross
	Meritorious Service Medal with two bronze oak leaf clusters
	Air Medal with two silver and one bronze oak leaf cluster
	Air Force Commendation Medal with two bronze oak leaf clusters
Unit awards
	Presidential Unit Citation
	Joint Meritorious Unit Award
	Air Force Outstanding Unit Award with Valor device and bronze oak leaf cluster
	Air Force Organizational Excellence Award with two oak leaf clusters
Service awards
	Combat Readiness Medal
Campaign and service medals
Width=44 scarlet ribbon with a central width-4 golden yellow stripe, flanked by pairs of width-1 scarlet, white, Old Glory blue, and white stripes	National Defense Service Medal with two bronze service stars
	Armed Forces Expeditionary Medal
	Vietnam Service Medal with three bronze service stars
	Armed Forces Service Medal
Service, training, and marksmanship awards
	Air Force Overseas Short Tour Service Ribbon with bronze oak leaf cluster
	Air Force Overseas Long Tour Service Ribbon with two bronze oak leaf clusters
	Air Force Longevity Service Award with silver and three bronze oak leaf clusters
	Small Arms Expert Marksmanship Ribbon
	Air Force Training Ribbon
Foreign awards
	Chilean Grand Cross of the Order of Aeronautical Merit
	South Korean Order of National Security Merit, Tong-il Medal
	Japanese Order of the Rising Sun, 1st Class
	Japanese Order of the Sacred Treasure
	The Most Noble Order of the Crown of Thailand, 1st Class
	Order of Merit of the Federal Republic of Germany, Knight Commander's Cross
	Spanish Grand Cross of the Order of Aeronautical Merit
	Singaporean Meritorious Service Medal (Military)
	Brazilian Order of Aeronautical Merit, Grand Officer
	French Legion of Honour, Commandeur Medal
	Netherlands Order of Orange-Nassau w/ swords, Commander
	Vietnam Gallantry Cross Unit Award
	NATO Medal for Former Yugoslavia
	SICOFAA Legion of Merit Officer Medal
	Vietnam Campaign Medal

== Effective dates of promotion ==
Insignia	Rank	Date
	General	Apr. 4, 1996
	Lieutenant general	May 10, 1993
	Major general	Jan. 1, 1991
	Brigadier general	May 1, 1988
	Colonel	July 1, 1981
	Lieutenant colonel	Apr. 1, 1979
	Major	June 1, 1976
	Captain	June 13, 1968
	First lieutenant	Dec. 9, 1966
	Second lieutenant	June 9, 1965

== Popular culture ==
General Michael E. Ryan appeared as himself in the Stargate SG-1 4th season episode 19 "Prodigy", a cable television series filmed in Canada receiving technical assistance from the Air Force Entertainment Liaison Office. He agreed to guest-star on Stargate SG-1 because as he put it, "The ideas that come out of science fiction are often more science than fiction." It also appealed to Ryan's sense of wonder, "The exploration of our own solar system is this century's challenge. It would be a big surprise to find a Stargate out there." Lead actor Richard Dean Anderson later recalled asking General Ryan off camera if he had subordinates as irreverent as Anderson's character Jack O'Neill. According to Anderson the reply was, "Son, yes. We've got colonels like you and worse."

Military offices
Preceded by Richard E. Hawley	Commander of United States Air Forces Europe; 1996–1997	Succeeded by John P. Jumper
Preceded by Ronald R. Fogleman	Chief of Staff of the United States Air Force; 1997–2001	Succeeded by John P. Jumper
