= Margaret Jane Wray =

American dramatic soprano (1962–2025)

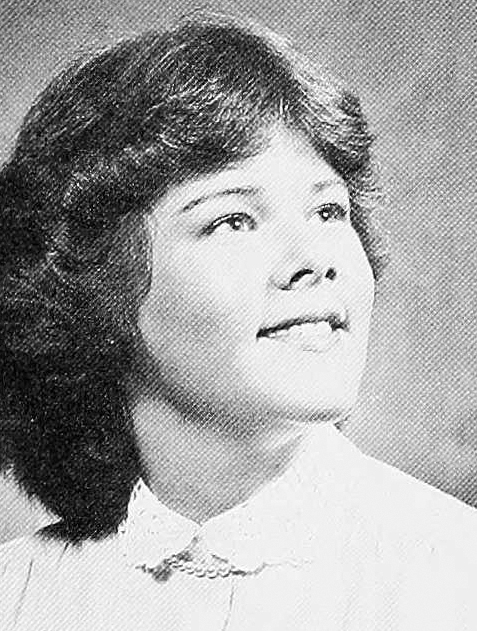
- Wray in 1981
- Born: December 17, 1962; Bexar, Texas, United States
- Died: December 2, 2025 (aged 62); Hudson, Wisconsin, United States
- Other name: Margaret W. Sames
- Education: University of North Texas
- Occupations: Operatic soprano; Voice teacher
- Awards: Richard Tucker Award

Margaret Jane Wray (December 17, 1962 – December 2, 2025) was an American dramatic soprano known for her interpretations of the works of Richard Wagner, performing at major opera houses in the United States and in Europe.

Born in Texas and raised in Illinois, Wray studied voice at the North Texas State University (now University of North Texas) and privately with soprano Ruth Falcon. She began her career performing as a mezzo-soprano at the Santa Fe Opera in 1984, and continued to perform as a mezzo until transitioning into the soprano repertoire in c. 1989. In her early career, she was a member of the young artist programs in Santa Fe, the Houston Grand Opera, and the Metropolitan Opera ("Met"). In 1989, she was the recipient of the prestigious Richard Tucker Award and that same year made her European debut at La Monnaie in Brussels. She had an active international career in operas and concerts until 2013 when she gave her final performances. In the United States, she was known for her appearances in The Ring Cycle at both the Met and the Seattle Opera, notably appearing in this work with the latter company in annual engagements from 2000 until her retirement in 2013. Her European engagements included performances at many leading opera houses, including La Scala, the Bavarian State Opera, and the Opéra National de Paris among others. She died in 2025 at the age of 62.

== Early life and education ==
Wray was born in Bexar, Texas, on December 17, 1962, to Royce Milton Wray and his wife Jewel Anne Wray (née Wickersham). Her parents both attended Arizona State College and married in 1954. Her father served in the United States Air Force before working as a pilot for American Airlines. Her sister, Dr. Susan Gail Wray, was an expert in early childhood education who lectured at conferences nationally and was a distinguished education professor at Montclair State University in New Jersey.

Wray grew up in St. Charles, Illinois, just outside Chicago, and graduated from St. Charles High School in 1981. She studied vocal performance at North Texas State University with John Large. She later studied voice privately with Ruth Falcon.

== Career ==
=== Early career ===
She began her career as a mezzo-soprano in 1984 in the young artist program at the Santa Fe Opera; making her debut with the company that year in the small role of Victim 17 in Hans Werner Henze's We Come to the River. In January 1985 she made her debut at the Fort Worth Opera (FWO) as the Madrigal Singer in Puccini's Manon Lescaut, and the following March performed the title role in Handel's Agrippina with the FWO.

In 1985, Wray won multiple singing competitions, including the San Francisco Opera Center competition, the Southwest Region division of the Metropolitan Opera National Council Auditions (MONCA), and the G. B. Dealey vocal competition in Dallas. The latter competition earned her a contract with the Dallas Opera (DO), and she gave her first performance with the DO in 1986 in the dual roles of La Musica and La Speranza in Monteverdi's L'Orfeo. She was also a finalist in the national part of the MONCA competition in 1985. In 1986 she was awarded the Jean Donnell Memorial Award by the San Francisco Opera, and in 1987 she won second prize in the MacAllister Awards for Opera Singers.

In 1985–1986, Wray was a member of the young artist program of the Houston Grand Opera (HGO), giving her first performance with the company in a concert dedicated to the music of Meredith Monk in September 1985. Works she performed with the HGO while in their program included the role of Martha in Gounod's Faust (1985), and as the soloist in de Falla's El amor brujo (1986). In 1987 she performed the role of Hippolyta in Britten's A Midsummer Night's Dream at both the Wolf Trap Opera and the Glimmerglass Opera. In 1989, she was awarded the Richard Tucker Award, and was featured in the 1990 televised Richard Tucker Gala hosted by Beverly Sills. In 1991, she was a finalist in the BBC Cardiff Singer of the World competition.

Wray was billed as a mezzo-soprano as late as 1988, but by 1989, she was being referred to as a soprano.

=== Metropolitan Opera ===
In the fall of 1986, Wray became a member of the Lindemann Young Artist Development Program at the Metropolitan Opera ("Met"). She gave her first performance at the Met on November 19, 1987 as Annina in Verdi's La traviata with Diana Soviero as Violetta and tenor Neil Rosenshein as Alfredo, the latter of whom was also making his Met company debut. She appeared at the house in more than 90 performances, first in supporting roles such as Sandmännchen in Humperdinck's Hänsel und Gretel, the Priestess in Aida, a Cretan woman in Idomeneo, the Voice of Antonia's Mother in Offenbach's Les contes d'Hoffmann, Berta in Rossini's Il barbiere di Siviglia, Giovanna in Verdi's Rigoletto and Helmwige in Wagner's Die Walküre. She appeared in the 2004 Ring cycle, conducted by Valery Gergiev, as both Sieglinde in Die Walküre, alongside Plácido Domingo, and as Gutrune in Götterdämmerung. She stepped in as Sieglinde for the second and third acts in a 2011 performance there.

=== European performances ===
Wray made her European debut in 1989 at La Monnaie in Brussels as Florinda in Schubert's Fierrabras. She performed in several more operas at that house, including Freia in Das Rheingold and Gutrune in Götterdämmerung. In 1992, she portrayed Countess Almaviva in Le nozze di Figaro with Opéra Bastille. In 1995, she performed the role of Eva in Graham Vick's production of Die Meistersinger von Nürnberg at the Teatro Regio in Turin, and appeared as Desdemona in Verdi's Otello at the Opéra de Nice. She made her début at La Scala in Milan in 2000, as Mme Lidoine in Poulenc's Dialogues des Carmélites, conducted by Riccardo Muti.

Wray first performed at the Berlin State Opera as Chrysothemis in Elektra by Richard Strauss. She portrayed Sieglinde first at the Theatre du Capitole in Toulouse. In 2008, Wray performed as Amneris in Verdi's Aida alongside Dennis O’Neill as Radames at the Welsh National Opera. Wray appeared in lead roles also with major opera companies in Europe, including the Bavarian State Opera in Munich, the Oper Frankfurt, and the Teatro Massimo Bellini in Catania, among others.

=== Other opera performances in North America ===
In 1990, Wray performed the role of Leonora in Verdi's Il trovatore (sung in French as Le trouvère) at Tulsa Opera with Barbara Smith Conrad as Azucena and Craig Sirianni as Manrico. In 1999, she performed the role of Leonore in Beethoven's Fidelio at the Utah Festival Opera. She belonged to the team of the Seattle Opera's Ring cycle from 2000 to 2013, as both Sieglinde in Die Walküre and Third Norn in Götterdämmerung. Reviewing her performance as Sieglinde in 2000, the San Francisco Examiner critic stated, "Her performance, in a word, was thrilling. With a brilliant soprano totally at her command, Wray conveyed both the torment of her character as well as her exaltation. The voice has steel in it, but the kind of metal that glistens and glowers." She also portrayed Sieglinde with the Austin Lyric Opera in 2001.

In 2002, Wray gave her first performance with the Cincinnati Opera as Sister Helen Prejean in Jake Heggie's Dead Man Walking, a role she later repeated at the Detroit Opera. In 2003, she performed the roles of Senta in Der fliegende Holländer and Chrysothemis in Richard Strauss's Elektra at the Pittsburgh Opera. In 2004, she performed the title role in Strauss's Ariadne auf Naxos with the Opéra de Montréal. In 2010, she appeared as Brangäne in Wagner's Tristan und Isolde at the Seattle Opera. In 2013, she appeared as Isolde in Wagner's Tristan und Isolde at the Canadian Opera Company, and portrayed Adriano in Rienzi with the Odyssey Opera in Boston. She retired from the stage the same year.

=== Concert singer ===
Wray also had a prolific career as a concert artist with many notable conductors including Seiji Ozawa. In 1988, she was alto soloist in Beethoven's Symphony No. 9 with the Fort Wayne Philharmonic Orchestra which was given in celebration of the 150th anniversary of Carmel United Methodist Church. She later was the soprano soloist in that same symphony with the Virginia Symphony Orchestra (1990) the Orchestre Métropolitain (1992), the Cleveland Orchestra (1993, conducted by Leonard Slatkin), the Chicago Symphony Orchestra (1994, conducted by Christoph Eschenbach), the Montreal Symphony Orchestra (1998, with conductor Charles Dutoit), the Boston Symphony Orchestra (1998, conducted by Mstislav Rostropovich), and the Minnesota Orchestra (2003, conducted by Giancarlo Guerrero). She returned to performing as the alto soloist in the Symphony No. 9 with the Alabama Symphony Orchestra in 2009.

In February 1990, she performed arias by Wagner and Verdi with the New World Symphony at the New World Center in a benefit concert for charities supporting those with HIV and AIDS. That same month she performed in a concert version of George Gershwin's musical Girl Crazy given at Alice Tully Hall. In the summer of 1990, she performed the part of Merab in Handel's oratorio Saul at the Oregon Bach Festival (OBF), and was also heard at the OBF as a soloist in Bach's Also hat Gott die Welt geliebt, BWV 68.

In 1991, Wray was a soloist in Mahler's Symphony No. 8 with both the Baltimore Symphony Orchestra and the Atlanta Symphony Orchestra. She subsequently performed in this symphony with the Cincinnati Symphony Orchestra (1994, conducted by James Conlon) the Cleveland Orchestra (1995, conducted by Robert Shaw), the Hallé Orchestra (1996, conducted by Kent Nagano), and the Delaware Symphony Orchestra (1998).

In 1992, she was a soloist in Mozart's Requiem with the Chicago Symphony Orchestra led by Daniel Barenboim, and in 1993 she performed as the soprano soloist in Britten's War Requiem with the Orchestre philharmonique de Radio France which was recorded live for national radio broadcast. In April 1993, she was a soloist in Rossini's Stabat Mater with the Cleveland Orchestra; a work she sang again with Music of the Baroque, Chicago in 1994. In July 1993, she was the soprano soloist in Verdi's Requiem with the Grant Park Symphony Orchestra. She repeated this work with the Dallas Symphony Orchestra (1994) the BBC National Orchestra of Wales (1996, conducted by Andrew Litton), and the Chicago Symphony Orchestra (2001, conducted by Barenboim). She performed as the alto soloist in the Verdi Requiem with the Alabama Symphony Orchestra in 2007.

In 1994, Wray appeared as Gutrune in act III of Götterdämmerung in concert with the Boston Symphony Orchestra led by Bernard Haitink. In 1996, she performed excerpts from Wagner's Tannhäuser and Die Meistersinger von Nürnberg for the opening of the 123rd Cincinnati May Festival. In August 1996, she was a soloist in Mahler's Symphony No. 2 with the Atlanta Symphony Orchestra led by Yoel Levi which was presented as part of the Olympics Arts Festival of the 1996 Summer Olympics. She repeated that work with the Phoenix Symphony in 1997 and the Columbus Symphony Orchestra in 2002.

In May 1997, Wray sang the Liebestod from Tristan und Isolde with the New York Philharmonic and conductor Kurt Masur, and performed excerpts from that opera at the Aspen Music Festival the same year. She later sang excerpts of role of Isolde in concerts with the Cincinnati Symphony Orchestra (1998, with Gary Lakes as Tristan), the orchestra of the Royal Opera House (1999, with conductor Mark Elder at the Cheltenham Festival), and the Rochester Philharmonic Orchestra (2001, with conductor Christopher Seaman).

In September 1999, she performed the part of Tove in Schoenberg's Gurre-Lieder with Mariss Jansons leading the Pittsburgh Symphony Orchestra. In January 2000, she returned to Ohio to perform the role of Elsa with the Cincinnati Symphony Orchestra in a concert version of Lohengrin with Robert Dean Smith in the title role. Later that year she performed in a concert of music by Wagner, Beethoven, and Liszt with the National Symphony Orchestra led by Conlon. She returned to Cincinnati in 2001 to sing Kundry in a complete concert version of Wagner's Parsifal conducted by Jesús López Cobos.

In 2005, Wray performed at Avery Fisher Hall with the Orchestra of St. Luke's with fellow soloists Deborah Voigt and Ben Heppner.

== Personal life ==
Wray married William Georg Sames in 1991; the couple had two sons. They moved to Hudson, Wisconsin, where she taught voice at the Phipps Center for the Arts and was a member of the board of the St. Croix Valley Opera.

Wray died in Hudson on December 2, 2025, at the age of 62.

== Roles ==
Wray's lead roles on stage included:

- Adriano, Rienzi (Wagner)
- Agrippina, Agrippina (Handel)
- Amneris, Aida (Verdi)
- Ariadne, Ariadne auf Naxos (R. Strauss)
- Brangäne Tristan und Isolde (Wagner)
- Chrysothemis, Elektra (R. Strauss)
- Countess Almaviva, Le nozze di Figaro (Mozart)
- Desdemona, Otello (Verdi)
- Donna Elvira, Don Giovanni (Mozart)
- Elisabeth, Tannhäuser (Wagner)
- Elsa, Lohengrin (Wagner)
- Eva, Die Meistersinger von Nürnberg (Wagner)
- Florinda, Fierrabras (Schubert)
- Freia, Das Rheingold (Wagner)
- Gutrune, Götterdämmerung (Wagner)
- Isolde Tristan und Isolde (Wagner)
- La Musica / La Speranza L'Orfeo (Monteverdi)
- Leonora, Il trovatore (Verdi)
- Leonore, Fidelio (Beethoven)
- Mme. Lidoine, Dialogues des Carmélites (Poulenc)
- Ortrud, Lohengrin (Wagner)
- Santuzza, Cavalleria rusticana
- Sieglinde, Die Walküre (Wagner)
- Senta, Der fliegende Holländer (Wagner)
- Sister Helen Prejean, Dead Man Walking (Jake Heggie)
- Third Norn, Götterdämmerung (Wagner)

== Recordings ==
=== Opera ===
Wray recorded excerpts from the role of Annina in La traviata with Kathleen Battle as Violetta and Plácido Domingo as Alfredo on the album Kathleen Battle and Plácido Domingo Live in Tokyo (1988, Deutsche Grammophon) which was recorded live with the Metropolitan Opera Orchestra led by James Levine during a concert tour to Japan. She took part in recordings of complete operas. In 2000, a video recording of Aida with her as Priestess was released, a live performance from the Met, with Plácido Domingo as Radames, Sherrill Milnes as Amonasro, conducted by James Levine. She performed the part of the Woman Convict in a recording of Shostakovich's Lady Macbeth of Mtsensk from the Opéra Bastille, released in 2010. The performance of the Seattle Ring cycle was recorded, released in 2014.

She recorded excerpts from Wagner's stage works in roles she had not yet performed on stage then, with the choir of the Bolshoi Theatre and the Russian State Symphony Orchestra conducted by John McGlinn; a 2003 recording includes the duet from the final act of Lohengrin, with Wray as Elsa and John Horton Murray in the title role, and a 2004 recording has the love duet from Tristan und Isolde, with Wray as Isolde, Nancy Maultsby as Brangäne and John Horton Murray as Tristan, and the final scene of Götterdämmerung with Wray as Brünnhilde.

=== Concert ===
In 1991, Wray recorded Mahler's Eighth Symphony with Deborah Voigt, Heidi Grant Murphy, Delores Ziegler, Marietta Simpson, Michael Sylvester, William Stone, Kenneth Cox, Atlanta Symphony Chorus and Boy Choir, the Ohio State University Chorale and Symphonic Choir, the Master Chorale of Tampa Bay and the University of South Florida Chorus, and the Atlanta Symphony Orchestra, conducted by Robert Shaw. In 2002, Wray recorded the same Symphony, with soloists including Juliane Banse, Cornelia Kallisch, Alessandra Marc, Dagmar Pecková, Glenn Winslade, Anthony Michaels-Moore, Peter Lika, Peter Mattei, Elisabeth Kulman, Christiane Iven, Hanno Müller-Brachmann, Siegfried Jerusalem, the EuropaChorAkademie, the Aurelius Sängerknaben and the Southwest German Radio Symphony Orchestra conducted by Michael Gielen. She was a soloist in a 2006 recording of Schoenberg's Die Jakobsleiter, alongside Laura Aikin and John Bröcheler, with Gielen conducting the same choirs and orchestra.
