= Frank Jackson (American football) =

American football player (born 1939)

No. 26
- Positions: Wide receiver, halfback

Personal information
- Born: April 14, 1939 (age 87); Paris, Texas, U.S.
- Listed height: 6 ft 1 in (1.85 m)
- Listed weight: 185 lb (84 kg)

Career information
- College: SMU
- AFL draft: 1961: 19th round, 149th overall pick

Career history
- Dallas Texans/Kansas City Chiefs (1961–1965); Miami Dolphins (1966–1967)

Awards and highlights
- AFL All-Star (1965); AFL champion (1962)

Career statistics
- Receptions: 188
- Receiving yards: 2,955
- Receiving touchdowns: 24
- Stats at Pro Football Reference

Frank Hardin Jackson (born April 14, 1939) is an American former professional football player who was a wide receiver in the American Football League (AFL). He played college football for the SMU Mustangs. After his football career, he became a criminal defense attorney.

== Early life ==
Jackson was born in 1939 in Paris, Texas. He was the younger brother of former Chicago Cardinals defensive back, Charlie Jackson. Jackson attended Paris High School. He received varsity letters in high school in basketball, baseball, football, and track. He earned all-state honors in football. He received more than 15 offers to play college football, including offers from Oklahoma, Notre Dame, and Texas A&M.

Jackson played college football at Southern Methodist University (SMU) from 1957 to 1960.

== Pro career ==
Jackson played professional football in the American Football League as a halfback for the Dallas Texans from 1961 to 1962. He appeared in 28 games for the Texans, tallying 1,247 return yards, 637 rushing yards, 348 receiving yards, and nine touchdowns.

In 1963, the Texans became the Kansas City Chiefs. Jackson played for the Chiefs from 1963 to 1965. Jackson was moved to the flanker position in Kansas City. He scored four touchdowns (two rushing, two receiving) for the Texans in a 49–21 victory over the Denver Broncos on December 10, 1961. On December 13, 1964, he caught four touchdown passes from Len Dawson in a 49–6 Chiefs defeat of the San Diego Chargers. That tied the pro football record at the time. He was an American Football League All-Star in 1965. He played on the Texans' 1962 AFL Championship team, winning the longest pro football game ever played up to that time in the AFL Championship game against the two-time defending AFL Champion Houston Oilers. Jackson intended to retire after 1965 to study medicine at the Kansas City College of Osteopathic Surgery. He had a year of medical school study done but elected to play with the Miami Dolphins, who drafted him in the expansion draft and eventually convinced him to a two-year contract, which much of the money deferred. During that first season, a meeting with attorney Percy Foreman, present in Florida for the murder trial involving Candy Mossler-& Melvin Lane Powers saw Jackson influenced to turn his attention away from medicine. On the field, Jackson started thirteen total games for the Dolphins and caught three touchdown passes before retiring in 1967.

== After football ==
After leaving football, Jackson became a lawyer, studying at the University of Miami Law School before moving back to Texas. He served as an assistant district attorney in Dallas along with time spent as a prosecutor before changing his profession to serve as a defense lawyer. In 2018, he was inducted into the Texas Criminal Defense Lawyers Association Hall of Fame.
