= Billy Minor =

American football player (born 1970)

No. 80
- Position: Wide receiver

Personal information
- Born: June 27, 1970 (age 56); Fort Riley, Kansas
- Listed height: 6 ft 2 in (1.88 m)
- Listed weight: 190 lb (86 kg)

Career information
- High school: Paris (Paris, Texas)
- College: East Texas State
- NFL draft: 1993: undrafted

Career history
- Philadelphia Eagles (1993)*; Dallas Texans (1993)
- * Offseason or practice squad member only

Awards and highlights
- First-team All-LSC (1992); Texas A&M-Commerce Athletic Hall of Fame (2023)

Billy Ray Minor Jr (born June 27, 1970) is an American former football wide receiver. He was in training camp with the Philadelphia Eagles NFL and played in the Arena Football League for the Dallas Texans in1993. He played college football at East Texas State University (now East Texas A&M University) where he was a 4-year letterman, 2 time All Lone Star Conference performer, Conference Champion, member of 2 National quarter-finalist teams, and finished his career as a top 5 receiver in program history in receptions and receiving yards. He was inducted with the 1990 team (LSC Champs and NCAA D2 Quarterfinalists) in 2013 and individually in 2023.

== Early life ==
Minor was born on the Fort Riley military base in Kansas and moved early in his life to the Northeast Texas city of Paris, Texas where he grew up. He played high school football under Allen Wilson at Paris High School where he was 1st team all-district, 1st team all-Red River Valley and 3rd team all-state in football after the 1987 season. He was also named to the Paris Wildcat All-Decade team of the 80s. Minor was a two sport athlete also making all-district, all-region and all-state in Track as their 4x400 relay team (Aaron Jenkins, Minor, Abram Jenkins and Kenneth Ellis) recorded the 9th fastest time among all high schools in the nation at 3:14.2 during the 1988 season.

== College career ==
Despite a stellar high school career, Minor was only shown marginal interest by major college programs such as Louisiana Tech University and Tulsa University. With no official football offers Minor planned to join the United States Marines Corp, however, his high school track coach made a call to coaches at East Texas State in Commerce, Texas. They invited him to try out for the East Texas State team where he walked on to the Lion football team and was awarded a football scholarship before the 1988 season.

=== 1988-1989 ===
Minor played as a true freshman during the 1988 season for East Texas, where he caught 3 passes for 48 yards. In that year, the Lions had their first winning season under Coach Eddie Vowell and finished 8-3 and were ranked as high as #2 in the nation, before losing their final two games. The team finished 2nd in the LSC standings. Minor missed the 1989 season due to a knee injury.

=== 1990 season ===
Minor rehabbed his injury and played every game during the 1990 season. During the regular season, he finished 3rd on the team in receiving as he caught 18 passes for 416 yards and 5 touchdowns. After the playoff numbers where added Minor ended the season 2nd to all-time leading receiver Gary Compton in yards, receptions and TDs. The Lions won the 1990 Lone Star Conference Championship and qualified for the 1990 NCAA Division II playoffs. The Lions defeated Grand Valley State in the first round and finished as National Quarterfinalists, bowing out to Pittsburg State, finishing 7th in the country.

=== 1991 season ===
Minor earned All-Lone Star Conference Honorable Mention honors for his 1991 season performance. He caught 25 passes for 571 yards and 4 touchdowns, in the regular season. He added 7 catches and 155 yards during the playoffs also. He caught the game winning touchdown against Texas A&M-Kingsville that gave the Lions their first road win over the powerful Javelinas since 1982. The Lions finished 2nd in the LSC and once again qualified for NCAA playoffs and finished as National quarterfinalists, finishing with a number 19 ranking.

=== 1992 season ===
In 1992, Minor was named a team captain and had his best statistical season as a Lion as he caught 40 passes for 731 yards and 5 touchdowns. He was named First-team All-Lone Star Conference and helped lead the Lions to an 8–3 record and a #14 final ranking. The team, once again, finished runner-up in the LSC standings. His final college career numbers were 99 receptions for 1,998 yards and 14 touchdowns. While attending ETSU, Minor studied accounting and was a member of the Alpha Phi Alpha fraternity.

== Professional career ==
=== Philadelphia Eagles ===
Minor was undrafted in the 1993 NFL draft but was signed as an undrafted free agent by the Philadelphia Eagles. He was joined in Philadelphia by Lion teammate Anthony Brooks. Minor had impressed his position coaches but an injury derailed his hopes to make the final roster and he was released before the preseason games started. Brooks and Minor were both inducted together into the 2023 TAMU-Commerce HOF.

=== Arena Football League ===
After being released by the Eagles, Minor was signed by the Dallas Texans of the Arena Football League. The Texans were coached by former East Texas State quarterback Mike Trigg. He played the 1993 Arena League season with the Texans and after the season, decided to leave professional football.

== Personal life ==
Minor now works in the healthcare industry and lives in Sherman, Texas with his wife Samantha and has 5 children. He has also contributed as a writer to The Lion Wire, an ETAM fan site blog, coached youth sports in Sherman and Varsity 7on7 football at C4 Sports and Performance with Sean Cooper in Durant, Oklahoma. In January 2023, The ETAM Athletic Department announced Minor would be inducted into the East Texas A&M University Athletic Hall of Fame Class of 2023 during the ceremony in October along with his friend, teammate and Frat brother Anthony Brooks.
