= Paris High School (Texas) =

Location
- 2255 South Collegiate Drive; Paris, Texas 75460-7899; United States
- Coordinates: 33.632790°N 95.523189°W

Information
- School type: Public high school
- School district: Paris Independent School District
- Principal: Chris Vaughn
- Grades: 9–12
- Enrollment: 1006 (2024-2025)
- Colors: Blue, white and gray
- Athletics conference: UIL Class 4A
- Nickname: Wildcats
- Website: Paris High School

Paris High School is a public high school serving students grades 9–12 located in the city of Paris, Lamar County, Texas, and is zoned to Paris and its immediate surroundings. It is one of the two high schools in the Paris Independent School District and is in UIL region 4A, In 2022, the school was rated "meets requirements" by the Texas Education Agency.

== Athletics ==
The Paris Wildcats compete in the following sports:

- Baseball
- Basketball
- Cross country
- Football
- Golf
- Powerlifting
- Softball
- Soccer
- Swimming
- Tennis
- Track and field
- Volleyball

=== State championships ===
- Football –
  - 1980 (4A)
  - 1988 (4A)

== Notable people ==
- Raymond Berry. American football player and coach
- Marsha Farney, a Republican member of the Texas House of Representatives for District 20 in Williamson County, is a former counselor at Paris High School
- Charlie Jackson (defensive back), American football player
- Frank Jackson (American football), American football player
- Jimmy J. Jumper, American general
- Billy Minor, American football player
- Kobe Savage, American football player
- Gene Stallings, American football coach
- Jordan Williams (linebacker), American football player
- Jack Wilson (American football), American football player
