= SICOFAA Legion of Merit Medal =

The SICOFAA Legion of Merit Medal Spanish: Condecoración Legión al Mérito del SICOFAA is awarded annually by the Chief of the Air Staff of the host nation of the Conference of the Chiefs of the Air Staff CONJEFAMER of the member nations of the Cooperation System of the American Air Forces (SICOFAA). Recipients are military members or civilians who have contributed to and promoted the interests of SICOFAA.

== Grades ==
The SICOFAA Legion of Merit is awarded in three grades:

- SICOFAA Legion of Merit Gentleman
- SICOFAA Legion of Merit Officer
- SICOFAA Legion of Merit Grand Cross

== Recipients ==
=== Legion of Merit Gentleman ===
- Abraham Rodriguez

=== Legion of Merit Officer ===
- Michael E. Ryan
- Salvador E. Batlle
- Antonio Ferraro

=== Grand Cross ===
- Ronald Fogleman
- T. Michael Moseley
- Robin Rand
- Mark Welsh
- Tod D. Wolters

== See also ==
- List of aviation awards
