= System of Cooperation Among the American Air Forces =

- SICOFAA emblem
- Active: 1961 - Current
- Country: Argentina, Bolivia, Brazil, Canada, Chile, Colombia, Dominican Republic, Ecuador, El Salvador, Guatemala, Guyana, Honduras, Jamaica, Mexico, Nicaragua, Panama, Paraguay, Peru, Uruguay, Venezuela and United States of America
- Allegiance: None
- Branch: Air Force
- Type: international organization
- Role: discuss military issues and aviation topics
- Garrison/HQ: Davis-Monthan Air Force Base, Arizona
- Nickname: SICOFAA

The System of Cooperation Among the American Air Forces (Spanish: Sistema de Cooperación entre las Fuerzas Aéreas Americanas, SICOFAA) is an apolitical voluntary international organization among the North and South American air forces.

SICOFAA's mission is to promote and strengthen the bonds of Air Forces throughout the Americas as well as to enable mutual support and joint cooperation when directed to do so by their respective governments. Critical focuses include air operations, human resources, education and training, search and rescue, disaster relief, telecommunications, aerospace medicine, weather, prevention of plane crashes, and scientific research.

The organization is based out of Davis-Monthan Air Force Base, Arizona.

== Mission ==
SICOFAA started in 1961 as a forum for senior leaders from Air Forces in the Western Hemisphere to discuss military issues and aviation topics. Today, the organization has become more formalized, but has kept to its voluntary and apolitical status while striving to foster friendship and cooperation among American Air Forces through the interchange of experiences, training and education. SICOFAA also develops procedures and plans to facilitate combined actions between air components of member nations.

SICOFAA holds a yearly meeting called the Conference of the American Air Chiefs or CONJEFAMER where air chiefs and representatives from member nations meet. The location of each year's CONJEFAMER conference rotates among member nations. Conference attendees meet to confer over recommendations and programs proposed during CONJEFAMER committee meetings held earlier in the year.

== History ==
On April 16, 1961, US Air Force Chief of Staff Thomas D. White hosted a conference at Randolph Air Force Base. Here the delegates proposed on creating an organization that would help fortify the inter-institutional relations and planning of effective professional cooperation of the American Air Forces.

In 1964, the Peruvian Air Force proposed the creation of a voluntary organization of mutual professional relations in a document titled "Bases and Procedures for a Cooperation System between the American Air Forces". This document was accepted in 1965 as the first corporate charter of SICOFAA.

Before 1990 SICOFAA consisted of three parts: the administrative (SPS), the communications (SITFAA), and the educational (IAAFA). During that time SICOFAA was under the Twelfth Air Force (AFSOUTH). It was in that year that Hurricane Andrew destroyed Homstead Air Force Base where both the administrative and educational parts of SICOFAA were stationed. It was then that SICOFAA was reorganized, IAAFA was moved to Lackland AFB and the administrative portion was moved to Andrews AFB. After this reorganization, the administrative partition was the only one that remained under the Twelfth Air Force. In 2011 the administrative portion was physically realigned to be collocated with the Twelfth Air Force (AFSOUTH) at Davis-Monthan AFB to be better supported.

== Members ==
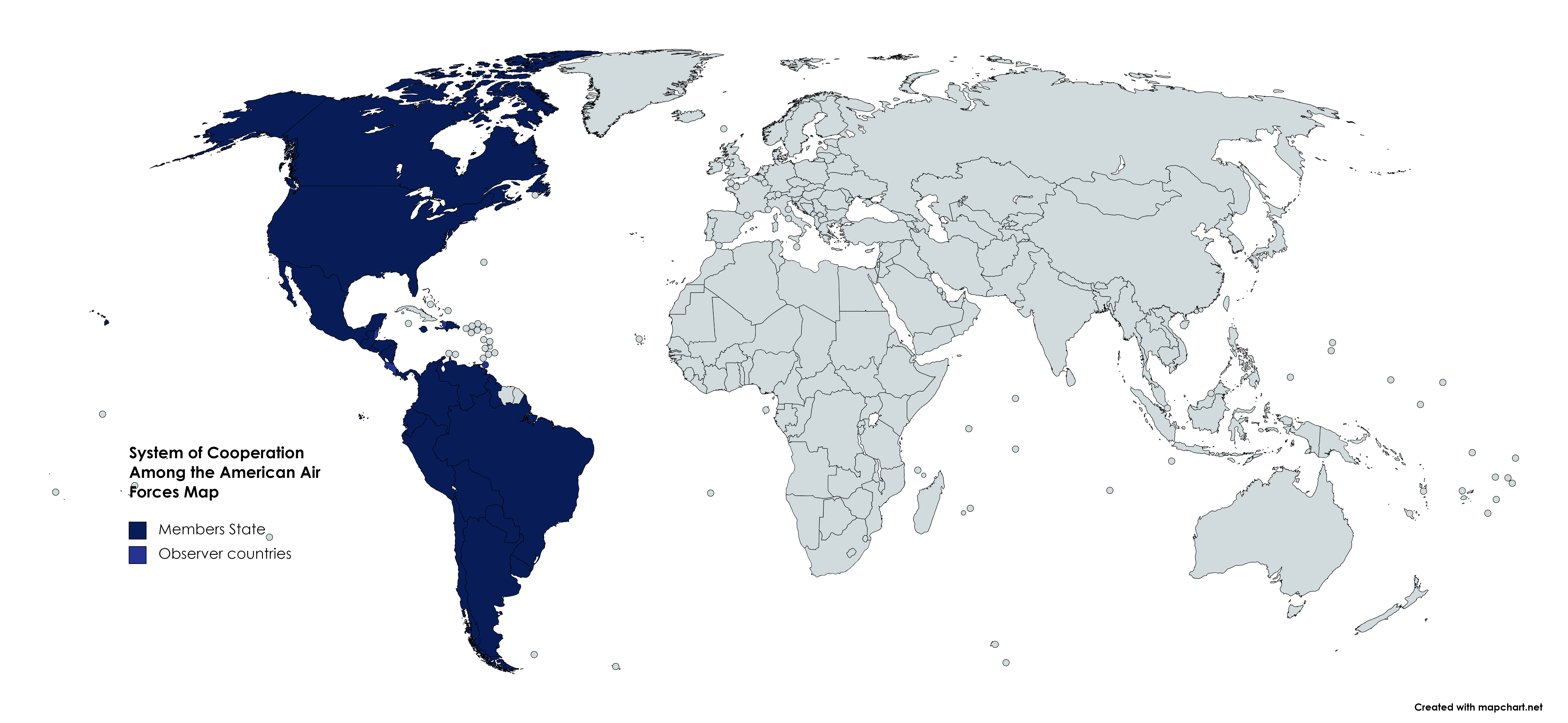
System of Cooperation Among the American Air Forces Map

SICOFAA is composed of 23 member countries:

Argentina
Belize
Bolivia
Brazil
Canada
Chile
Colombia
Costa Rica
Dominican Republic
Ecuador
El Salvador
Guatemala
Guyana
Honduras
Jamaica
Mexico
Nicaragua
Panama
Paraguay
Peru
United States
Uruguay
Venezuela

And two observer countries:

Haiti
Trinidad and Tobago

== Organization ==
=== Committees ===
Committees are permanent organisms that study and analyze subjects, interchange ideas and share procedures that improve the operations and collaboration between the member countries of SICOFAA.

=== SPS ===
The SICOFAA Permanent Secretariat (Spanish: Secretaría Permanente del Sistema, SPS) is responsible for administrative functions of SICOFAA and is located at Davis-Monthan Air Force Base. Its purpose is to centralize and ensure continuity and permanence to all the activities of SICOFAA as they are established at the CONJEFAMER. The SPS consists of a Secretary General (an USAF O-6), and a Sub Secretary, and Editor, and other support staff (military and civilian). The Sub Secretary position rotates among Colonels of the member countries, it is a two-year tour.

=== OENFA ===
The Liaison Officer of the Air Force (Spanish: Oficial Enlace de la Fuerza Aérea, OENFA) is the link between Air Force Chiefs of Staff and SICOFAA. Each member country has an OENFA.

=== SITFAA ===
SITFAA logo

The Information Technology and Telecommunications System of the American Air Forces (Spanish: Sistema de Informática y Telecomunicaciones de las Fuerzas Aéreas de América, SITFAA) is responsible for communications between SICOFAA's member countries. In 1964 SITFAA was created to meet the communication needs of SICOFAA. Originally SITFAA was part of the Science and Technology Committee but advances and technology have spurred SITFAA to become its own entity inside SICOFAA.

SITFAA's capabilities include voice, fax, Internet, and High Frequency. Each country has its own station within the SITFAA network.

Each member country has a SITFAA station, however, after SICOFAA reorganized in 1990 the United States SITFAA station moved from Albrook AFS, Republic of Panama, to Andrews AFB in Maryland. It then moved to its present location at Davis-Monthan AFB in 2014. The United States does not have a SITFAA station, its station serves as the Master Net Control Station (ECR or Estacion en Control de la Red ).

==== Network ====
SITFAA is broken into two networks: the Northern Circuit (Circuito Norte) and Southern Circuit (Circuito Sur).

The Northern Circuit consists of:

- Canada
- Colombia
- El Salvador
- United States
- Guatemala
- Honduras
- Jamaica
- Mexico
- Nicaragua
- Panama
- Dominican Republic

The Southern Circuit consists of:

- Argentina
- Bolivia
- Brazil
- Chile
- Ecuador
- Guyana
- Paraguay
- Peru
- Uruguay
- Venezuela

The United States is the Network Control Station (Estación Control de la Red, ECR). This station is staffed by two operators and an officer stationed at Davis-Monthan Air Force Base.

Each circuit members take turns being the Northern Circuit Control Station (Estación Control del Circuito Norte, ECCN) or the Southern Circuit Control Station (Estación Control del Circuito Sur, ECCS).

=== Meetings ===
Each year, the committees meet and discuss their fields. The findings are then brought to the yearly PREPLAN where the member countries decide on what topics will be discussed for implementation in the Conference of the Chiefs of the American Air Forces (Conferencia de los Jefes de las Fuerzas Aéreas Americanas, CONJEFAMER).

During the years that an exercise will take place, named COOPERACIÓN, there are three planning meeting prior to the exercise. If time permits, there will be a fifth meeting (the exercise counting as one) to compile all the lessons learned. These lessons learned are then brought to the yearly PREPLAN where the member countries finalize the presentations that will be conducted during the CONJEFAMER.

The top Generals of the member Air Forces make decisions on the findings of the committees brought before them. The Chief of the Air Force of the host nation awards the SICOFAA Legion of Merit Medal at this conference.

== Awards ==
The Legion of Merit Award American Aviation Fellowship, was created in the XVIII CONJEFAMER, which was held in the United States in 1978, with the aim of encouraging those military or civilian, public or private institutions, relating to Air Forces in the Americas, whose actions have promoted and fostered the growth and importance of the System of Cooperation among American Air Forces (SICOFAA).

- SICOFAA Legion of Merit Gentleman
- SICOFAA Legion of Merit Officer
- SICOFAA Legion of Merit Grand Cross

== See also ==
- Organization of American States
- Inter-American Treaty of Reciprocal Assistance
- South America air forces maneuvers
