= Bexar, Texas =

- Unincorporated community
- Location within Texas Location within the United States
- Coordinates: 29°13′32″N 98°41′16″W
- Country: United States
- State: Texas
- County: Bexar
- Elevation: 656 ft (200 m)
- Time zone: UTC-6 (Central (CST))
  - Summer (DST): UTC-5 (CDT)
- Area code: 210
- GNIS feature ID: 1379416

Bexar is an unincorporated community in Bexar County, in the U.S. state of Texas. It is located within the Greater San Antonio metropolitan area.

== Education ==
Bexar is served by the Somerset Independent School District.

== Notable people ==
- James Richard Curry, American serial killer
- Margaret Jane Wray, operatic soprano
