= Murder of Michelle Garvey =

Formerly unidentified murder victim

Michelle Garvey
- Portrait of Michelle Garvey
- Born: Michelle Angela Garvey; June 3, 1967; Jersey City, New Jersey, U.S.
- Disappeared: June 1, 1982; New London, Connecticut, U.S.
- Died: July 1, 1982 (aged 15)
- Cause of death: Homicide by strangulation
- Body discovered: July 1, 1982; Baytown, Texas, U.S.
- Resting place: St. Patrick Cemetery, Montville, Connecticut

Michelle Angela Garvey (June 3, 1967 – July 1, 1982) was an American teenage girl murdered in Texas within a month of running away from her home in Connecticut. Her body was quickly found but remained unidentified until a 2014 DNA test, after an amateur Internet researcher suggested a match between the Texas unidentified decedent and Connecticut missing-person data.

== Circumstances ==
Michelle Garvey went missing from New London, Connecticut, presumably after running away from home, on June 1, 1982, at the age of fourteen. She was believed to have intended to return to her birth state, New Jersey, or to North Carolina. She had a previous history of running away, according to the National Center for Missing and Exploited Children. Initially, it was unknown what had happened to Garvey, as she may have left home to start a new life and was thought to have possibly been still alive.

== Discovery ==
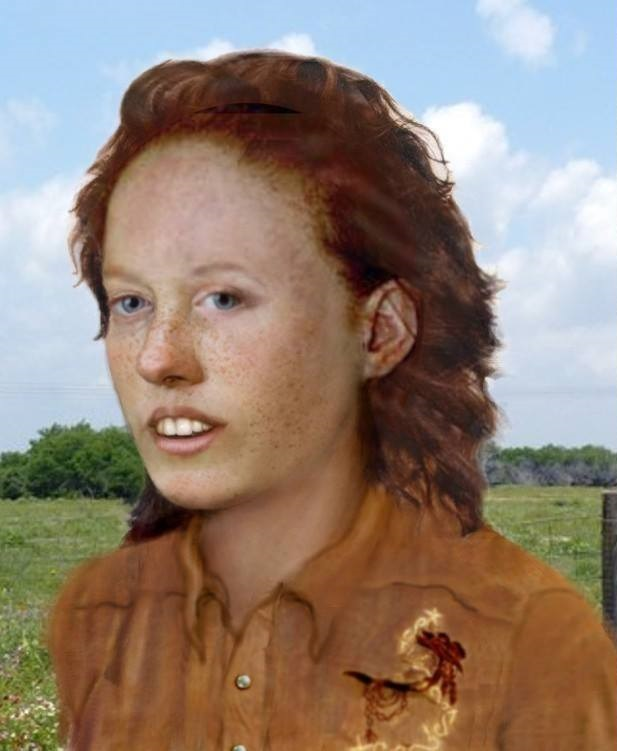
Artist Carl Koppelman's impression of what the then-unidentified Garvey looked like in life

Garvey's body was found on July 1, 1982, in Baytown, Texas, one month after she went missing. Authorities were unable to identify her body, but could determine that the victim was a white female between fifteen and twenty years old with blue eyes and curly red hair. The cause of death of the victim was determined to be strangulation. The girl also had an inverted left nipple, O-positive blood type, a scar on one foot, was approximately five feet one inch to five feet three inches (1.60 m) tall, and had one of her ears pierced. Her body was found wearing brown clothing, including a long-sleeved, button-down shirt with a distinct horse embroidery on the breast pocket. Her pants were made of corduroy material. The body was disposed of in a field after she died, possibly merely hours after her murder. There was evidence that Garvey had been sexually assaulted. No bra or shoes were recovered and the shirt had also been unbuttoned.

As a Jane Doe, Michelle was buried temporarily at the Harris County II Cemetery near two other unidentified murder victims found in 1981, who were identified in 2021 as Dean and Tina Clouse.

== Identification ==
The body was exhumed in May 2011 to obtain a DNA profile to compare to potential matches, including Garvey's brother. An amateur online sleuth, Polly Penwell, came across the cases of Garvey and the unidentified body and suggested to the National Center for Missing and Exploited Children (NCMEC) and the Harris County medical examiner that they could be the same person after she compared both cases, while using a website known as Websleuths.

Garvey was identified in January 2014, through the efforts of NCMEC and by the Harris County Police Department, who had contacted her family and obtained samples of their DNA for testing in August 2013, to add to an old sample taken from her brother, which had previously been submitted to the National Missing and Unidentified Persons System and analyzed by the University of North Texas. She had remained unidentified for 31 years; Garvey was fourteen when she disappeared from Connecticut, and was fifteen at the time of her death, more than half-way across the country. Since her identification, authorities have continued their investigation, now aimed at finding Garvey's murderer.

It was revealed that Garvey likely ran away from home, leaving through a window, then probably hitched a ride with an unknown driver. Authorities expressed interest in how the victim arrived in Texas and what the motive for her murder may have been, as well as who may have transported her to where she later died. Her case was also possibly connected to other "Texas Killing Fields" murders, although no link has been officially determined.

After being returned from Texas to Connecticut, Garvey's body was reburied by her family on March 1, 2014, in Montville, Connecticut.

== See also ==
- Death of Janice Marie Young, where the victim remained unidentified for 41 years
- Murder of Tammy Alexander, where the victim remained unidentified for 35 years
- Murders of Dean and Tina Clouse, who were buried next to Garvey in the Harris County II Cemetery while all were unidentified
- Murder of Carol Cole, where the victim remained unidentified for 34 years
- Murder of Elizabeth Roberts, where the victim remained unidentified for 43 years
- Lists of solved missing person cases
- List of unsolved murders (1980–1999)
