= Murders of Pamela Buckley and James Freund =

Unsolved murders in Sumter County, South Carolina

- Location of Sumter County, South Carolina
- Location: Unincorporated Sumter County, South Carolina, U.S.
- Date: August 9, 1976; 50 years ago
- Target: Pamela Mae Buckley and James Paul Freund
- Attack type: Double-murder, shooting
- Weapon: .357 caliber revolver
- Deaths: 2 (Pamela Mae Buckley, aged 24; James Paul Freund, aged 29)
- Perpetrator: Unknown
- Motive: Unknown
- Accused: Lonnie George Henry (died 1982); Henry Lee Lucas (died 2001)
- Investigation reopened January 21, 2021

James Paul Freund (September 16, 1946 – August 9, 1976) and Pamela Mae Buckley (December 16, 1951 – August 9, 1976), commonly known as the Sumter County Does, Jock Doe and Jane Doe respectively, were two previously unidentified American murder victims found in Sumter County, South Carolina, on August 9, 1976. They had apparently traveled through various places in the United States before being murdered in South Carolina. This was inferred from some of their belongings.

The male victim had been shot three times in the upper chest and the female victim was shot in the upper chest and through the neck. The weapon used was believed to be a .357 caliber revolver.

Sumter County Coroner Verna Moore continued to work on the case until her retirement in 2009. The victims were unidentified for forty-five years, despite the fact that their descriptions, sketches of their faces, dental information, and fingerprints had been distributed across the United States. Their murders remain unsolved.

The male victim had been referred to as "Jock Doe", which may have originated from the French name "Jacques," an indication he may have been from French Canada. A man who claimed he had met the victims stated that he was told by the male victim that his name was "Jock" and that he had left his Canadian family with his girlfriend. The male victim had furthermore stated that his father was a well-known doctor; this supported the theory that his family was wealthy.

It was announced on January 19, 2021, that both victims had been identified. A statement by the DNA Doe Project described the resolution of the case, and that they were withholding additional information, including the decedents' names. A news report published later in the day elaborated that the male victim was from Pennsylvania and the female was from Wisconsin. It was clarified the following day that the female was actually from the state of Minnesota.

== Discovery of the bodies ==
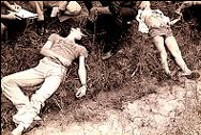
The crime scene, showing how the victims’ bodies were found

In the early morning hours of August 9, 1976, the young man and woman were said to have been seen from a distance by a hermit. It was said they had been dropped off on Locklair Road, a secluded dirt road between I-95 and S.C. 341 (Lynches River Road).

The victims may have had their vehicle hijacked, possibly by hitchhikers. Then, upon their exiting the vehicle, someone may have shot them both in the back.

At 6:20 a.m., a trucker named Martin Durant found the bodies and contacted Charles Graham, an employee at a nearby store. Graham, in turn, contacted the authorities.

== James Freund ==
James Paul Freund
- Freund in 1964
- Born: September 16, 1946; Fitchburg, Massachusetts, U.S.
- Disappeared: December 25, 1975; Lancaster, Pennsylvania, U.S.
- Status: Identified after 44 years
- Died: August 9, 1976 (aged 29); Sumter County, South Carolina, U.S.
- Cause of death: Homicide by firearm
- Other name: "Jock Doe"
- Known for: Formerly unidentified victim of homicide
- Height: 6 ft 1.25 in (1.86 m)
- Spouse(s): Cherylene Albright (m. 1965; sep. 1975)

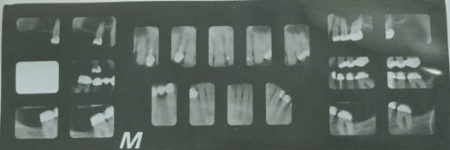
X-rays of Freund's teeth, which suggested he was older than initially estimated.

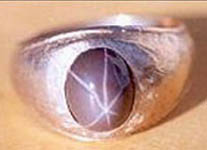
Ring worn by James Freund.

The male victim was at first believed to be between 18 and 22 years of age, but his dentition suggested that he may have been older than 27. The age range was updated to be between 18 and 30 years after his case was entered into NamUs.

The forensic dentist who examined the man's teeth said he believed he was over 27, but that he had looked younger due to his clothing and build. The victim was white with an olive complexion. He had brown, shoulder-length hair, brown eyes, and very distinctive bushy eyebrows. He stood over 6 feet (183 cm) tall, weighed about 150 pounds (68 kg), and had extensive, elaborate dental work that may have been performed outside the United States. This might indicate a higher socioeconomic status.

A unique type of root canal surgery had been performed during the man's life. It looked as if he had been midway through a complete dental restoration. The man had a four-inch (10 cm) appendectomy scar. He also had various scars on his back and shoulders, which indicated frequent participation in contact sports.

He was wearing faded Levi brand jeans and a red T-shirt. The shirt read "Coors – America's Light Beer" on the front and "Camel Challenger GT Sebring '75" on the back, along with a Snoopy design. The shirt was apparently a promotional item from the Sebring Races held in Sebring, Florida, in 1975, which were sponsored by the Coors Brewing Company. He wore no underwear and carried a pack of "Grant's Truck Stop" matches in a pants pocket. The matches are believed to have come from a Grant's Truck Stop in the Midwest.

He wore a yellow gold Bulova Accutron wristwatch with a Twist-o-Flex band, bearing the serial number H918803. Using this number, investigators were able to determine that Bulova had made the watch in 1968 but when the Bulova company downsized in the early 1970s, they destroyed many of their records, meaning that there was no way to ascertain where the victim's watch was distributed or bought. He also wore a 14-karat gold ring set with a gray star sapphire stone. The initials JPF were engraved inside the ring, which had a Florentine finish. Both the ring and the watch were rather expensive. This, together with the man's elaborate dental work, suggested that he had come from an affluent family.

== Pamela Buckley ==
Pamela Mae Buckley
- Buckley in 1970
- Born: December 16, 1951; Redwood County, Minnesota, U.S.
- Disappeared: c. December 1975; Colorado Springs, Colorado, U.S.
- Status: Identified after 44 years
- Died: August 9, 1976 (aged 24); Sumter County, South Carolina, U.S.
- Cause of death: Homicide by firearm
- Other name: "Jane Doe"
- Known for: Formerly unidentified victim of homicide
- Height: 5 ft 5 in (1.65 m)
- Spouse(s): Gary Clifford Kennell (m. 1972; div. 1976)

The female victim was slightly younger than the man. She was originally thought to be between 18 and 20 years old. After her case was entered into NamUs, her age estimate was increased to 18 to 25 years. She stood 5 feet 5 inches (165 cm) tall, weighed 100–105 pounds (45–48 kg), and had a slim build and an olive complexion like that of her companion. This led some observers to speculate that they may have been siblings.

She had reddish-brown, shoulder-length hair and bluish-gray eyes (some sources state "hazel"). She had two distinctive moles on the left side of her face near her mouth.

The coroner noted that the young woman had "unusually long," natural eyelashes and that both victims were very clean and well-groomed. She had fillings in all of her back teeth, and her front teeth would have appeared straight even if she were to smile. She had no surgical scars, had never been pregnant, and her legs had not been shaved. Unlike her male companion, no scars were found on her body.

She was wearing an unbleached white muslin blouse over a pink, front-tying halter top. She wore blue denim cut-off shorts (Daisy Dukes). She had a floral print scarf tied around her waist as a belt.

She wore Stride-Rite brand wedge-heeled sandals that were lavender and hot pink in color.

She wore three distinctive rings.

- The first ring was a black, oblong stone with what appeared to be small turquoise chips embedded in it.
- The second had an ornate scrolling feather shape with coral and turquoise stones.
- The third was a simple metal band with red, white, and blue stones.

These rings appeared to be authentic handmade Native American or Mexican costume jewelry. They were all made of sterling silver. They appeared to have originated in the Southwestern United States.

Like the man beside her, the female victim wore no underwear.

Rings worn by Buckley

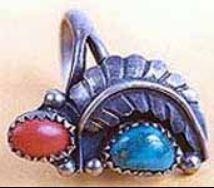

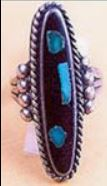

== Leads and theories ==
In 1977, a man named Lonnie George Henry was arrested in Latta, South Carolina, for driving while intoxicated. He owned a revolver (found in his vehicle) of the same kind as the murder weapon. It was proven to be the murder weapon after it was test-fired by investigators. However, Henry was ultimately not charged because insufficient evidence existed to file murder charges against him, and he died in 1982.

Investigators traveled to the city of Brunswick, Georgia. They met with a mother and father who were thought to be possible acquaintances of the Jane Doe. Their daughter was missing and her ex-boyfriend had reported a similarity between the female victim and his ex-girlfriend. However, after showing the parents of the missing woman photographs of the female victim, neither they nor her friends could verify that it was her. After a dental comparison, it was found that the two women did not match.

The initials JPF, engraved inside the man's ring, supported the theory that his name was Jacques or at least started with a J.

The book of matches found in the man's pocket provided a further clue. The matches came from a truck stop chain which had locations in Idaho, Nebraska, and Arizona. After information was released to the public, a man from Nebraska stated that he may have performed repairs on a car with Oregon or Washington license plates, whose owners matched the description of the victims. But this uncovered no additional leads.

Some speculate that notable serial killer Henry Lee Lucas could have been involved in the murders. Lucas himself told police that he had been in South Carolina the day that the victims died, but he was received with skepticism as he had a penchant for false confessions. He was never charged with the crime and died in 2001 due to heart failure. Earlier, Lucas had confessed to two murders that also happened in Sumter County; that of an elderly woman in 1975 and of a young man in 1983. Like most other leads, this revealed no additional clues to the pair's names or their actual murderer.

== Burial ==
The couple's bodies were kept at a local funeral home in caskets with airtight, see-through lids in hopes that someone would identify them. People from all over the country called to inquire about them, including several parents of young runaways. None were able to identify the bodies.

The bodies remained on display until they began to deteriorate. On August 14, 1977, one year and five days after the bodies were found, they were interred in Bethel United Methodist Church Cemetery in Oswego, South Carolina. Hundreds attended the funeral service. Law enforcement agencies raised several hundred dollars to pay the funeral home.

Their graves had stone/granite markers which read "Male Unknown" and "Female Unknown."

== Later investigation and identification ==
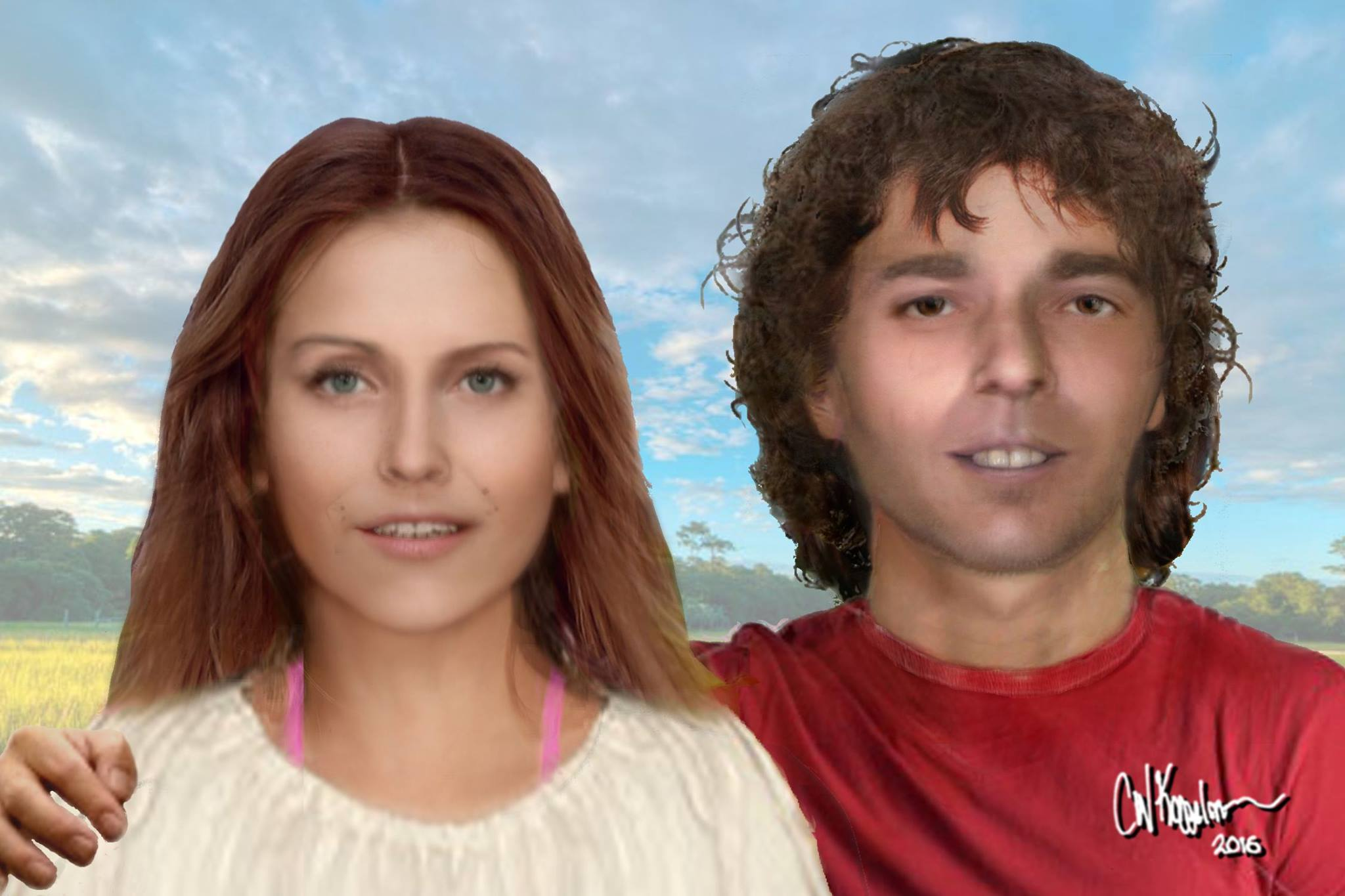
Contemporary forensic facial reconstruction depicting approximations by Carl Koppelman of the then-unidentified victims during life.

In 2007, both bodies were exhumed to obtain DNA information. This led to the theory of the pair's having been siblings being disproved; the testing showed that they were not genetically related, though they did resemble each other.

The DNA Doe Project, an organization working to resolve unidentified decedent cases, was recruited in July 2019 for assistance to identify the then-unidentified couple. A total of $2,300 was donated to fund the extraction of usable DNA profiles from bone marrow for genetic genealogy research. The DNA extraction was done by Astrea Forensics where they used a specialized DNA extraction procedure. On October 12, 2020, they released the results from their genealogical tests of the victim's ancestral backgrounds. In January the following year, the organization announced they had successfully aided with the victims' identifications as a pair of American hitchhikers.

They were identified as Pamela Mae Buckley and James Paul Freund on January 21, 2021, at a press conference. Freund was last seen on December 25, 1975, in Lancaster, Pennsylvania. Buckley, who was originally from Minnesota, was last seen in December 1975 in Colorado Springs, Colorado, where she was also reported missing.

== See also ==
- Murders of Dean and Tina Clouse
- List of unsolved murders (1900–1979)
- List of solved missing person cases (1970s)
