= The Lost Daughter =

The Lost Daughter may refer to:

== Books ==
- The Lost Daughter (novel), a 2006 novel by Elena Ferrante
- The Lost Daughter, a 1999 novel by Joanna Hines
- The Lost Daughter, a 2011 novel by Lucretia Grindle
- The Lost Daughter, a 2017 novel by David Ashton
- The Lost Daughter and Other Stories of the Heart, an 1857 short story collection by Caroline Lee Hentz
- The Lost Daughter, a 2013 memoir by Mary Williams

== Film and television ==
=== Film ===
- The Lost Daughter (film), a 2021 film based on Elena Ferrante's novel
- The Lost Daughter, a 1997 TV film directed by Roger Cardinal

=== TV ===
- Into the Fire: The Lost Daughter, a 2024 true crime two-part miniseries directed by Ryan White, about the murder of Aundria Bowman
- "The Lost Daughter", a 1997 episode of the German TV series Alarm für Cobra 11 – Die Autobahnpolizei
- "The Lost Daughter", a 2018 episode of the Philippine television drama Onanay
- Palace 3: The Lost Daughter, a 2014 Chinese television series
