= Disappearance of Margaret Ellen Fox =

Disappearance of a 14-year-old American girl

Margaret Ellen Fox
- Margaret Ellen Fox's FBI Missing poster
- Born: Margaret Ellen Fox; February 4, 1960
- Disappeared: June 24, 1974 (aged 14); Burlington, New Jersey, U.S.
- Status: Missing for 52 years and 9 days
- Height: 5 ft 2 in (1.57 m)

Margaret Ellen “Maggie” Fox (born February 4, 1960) was a 14-year-old American girl who vanished under suspicious circumstances in Burlington, New Jersey, in 1974.

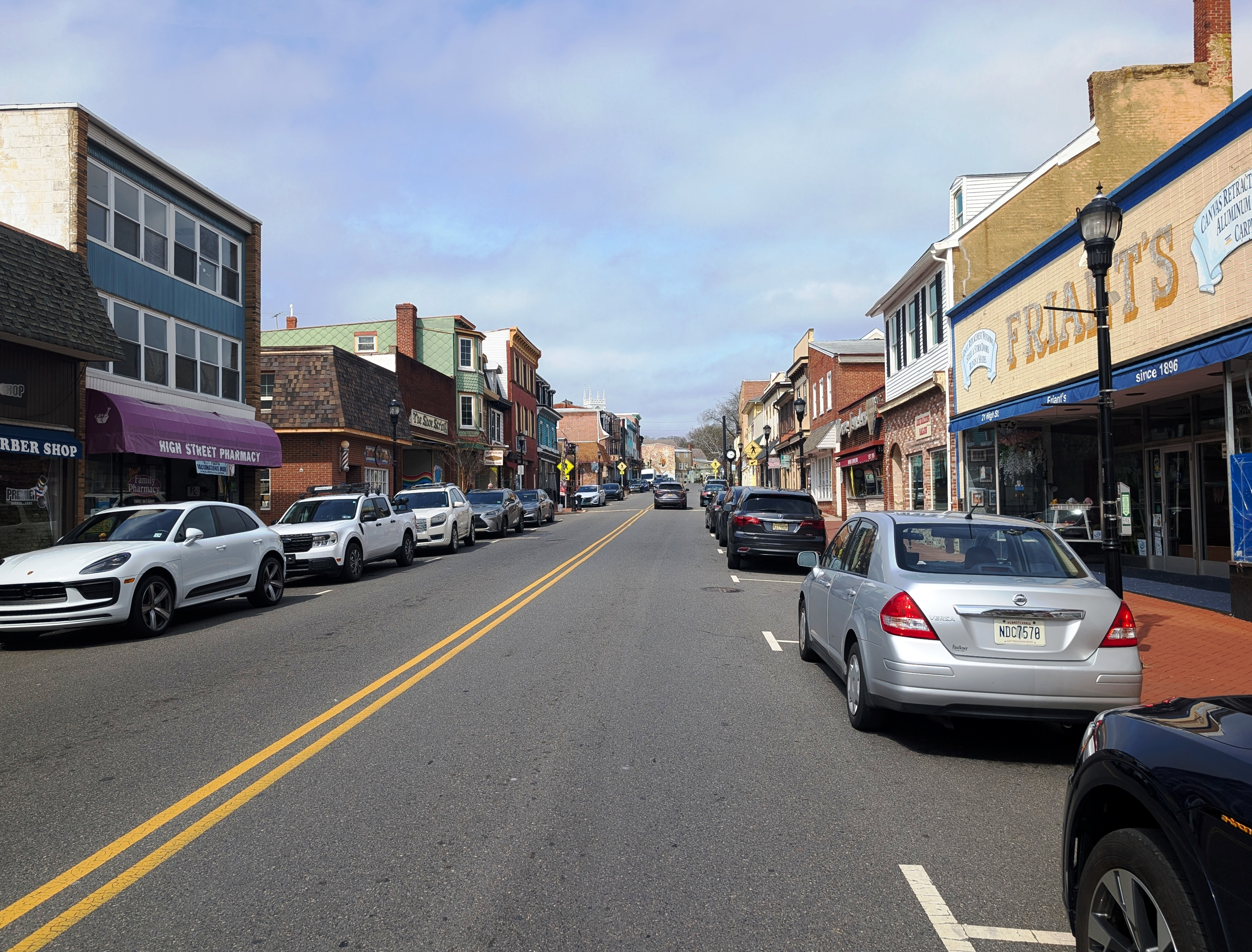
High Street nb, Mount Holly, NJ, April 2026 where Fox was last seen

== Disappearance ==
Locations 1974

On June 24, 1974, Margaret Ellen Fox had plans to meet with a man who called himself "John Marshall" in regards to a babysitting job. Marshall had responded to an advertisement she had placed for her services and stated he needed a babysitter the following weekend, but postponed the first several meetings with her. He finally said that he would meet her in a red Volkswagen. Fox took a bus to get to Mount Holly, New Jersey. Her younger brother accompanied her to the bus stop and saw her board the bus. Witnesses reported seeing Fox near Mill and High streets after she reached Mount Holly. She has not been seen since.

=== Ransom call ===
In the hours after Fox was reported missing, authorities started to record all phone calls that went to and from the Fox residence. One of these phone calls was from a man who demanded a US$10,000 (equivalent to about $65,000 in 2025) ransom for her safe return. The man stated to Margaret's mother, who took the telephone call, "10,000 might be a lot of bread, but your daughter's life is the buttered topping."

== Investigation ==
After Fox failed to return home, her family notified authorities of her disappearance. Upon investigation, authorities discovered that "John Marshall" gave Fox a phone number prior to her disappearance. The number was later traced to a phone booth at a supermarket in Lumberton. Authorities immediately knew that the circumstances surrounding Fox's disappearance were suspicious in nature, believing that the girl became the victim of an abduction. Several other parents complained of men trying to lure their daughters with fake job offers. In 1976, a suspect in her case confessed to involvement in her disappearance but it turned out to be false. Marshall has never been identified.

=== 2019 updates ===
External image
- 2016 age progression of Fox to 56

The Burlington City Police Department and the FBI have reevaluated their efforts to find Fox and her abductor. The audio recording of the ransom call has been uploaded to the FBI website in an effort to see if someone might recognize the voice of the man who claimed he had Fox and wanted $10,000 for her safe return. In 2017, a retired police officer entered into a partnership with the Burlington PD to review and hopefully solve the case. A $25,000 reward is being offered for information leading to the arrests of Fox's abductor(s). There have been no arrests made since.

=== Unidentified persons exclusions ===
According to the National Missing and Unidentified Persons System, the following decedents were ruled out as being the remains of Fox. (Note: The National Missing and Unidentified Persons System's listing of excluded individuals is only viewable after creating an account with the website.)

Name	Location	Date	Age	Cause of death	Circumstances
Louise Fleischer	Chesapeake, Ohio	April 22, 1981	64–66	Strangulation	A woman whose body was discovered in a well, having been killed between 1979 and 1981. Before her identification in 2019, she was thought to be as young as 30 years old when she died.
Cynthia Gastelle	Haymarket, Virginia	February 11, 1982	18	Stabbing	A young woman discovered two years after her disappearance in 1980. Her remains were identified in 2012.
Brenda Black	New Lenox, Illinois	April 19, 1981	26	Undetermined	An Ohio native whose body was found along Interstate 80, and is thought to have been thrown from a moving vehicle about a year before her discovery in 1981. Black remained unidentified until 2022
Mary Silvani	Washoe County, Nevada	July 17, 1982	33	Gunshot	A Michigan native, estranged from family members, killed by a now-deceased serial offender. Silvani remained unidentified until 2019.
Alleghany County Jane Doe	Alleghany County, Virginia	November 18, 1985	35–75	Undetermined	A currently unidentified female whose partial remains were located by hunters.
Tena Marie Gattrell	Knoxville, Tennessee	June 1, 1987	27	Gunshot (self-defense)	A California native who was killed in an attempted robbery. Gattrell remained unidentified until 2021.
Patrice Corely	Hebron, Ohio	April 19, 1990	29	Beating	A Kentucky native who remained unidentified until 2017.
Marta Haydee Rodriguez	Stafford, Virginia	February 3, 1991	28	Murder	A woman who initially disappeared in 1989. After her 2018 identification, her ex-boyfriend was charged with her murder.
Sharon Kay Abbott Lane	Centreville, Virginia	December 6, 1993	28	Stabbing	Lane, who initially disappeared in 1987, was discovered in a shallow grave in 1993. Lane was named “Fairfax County Jane Doe” until her identification in December 2022.
Newport News Jane Doe	Newport News, Virginia	June 6, 2014	25–45	Undetermined	A currently unidentified female whose mummified body was discovered underneath a sheet.

== See also ==
- List of kidnappings
- List of people who disappeared
