= Flashover (disambiguation) =

A flashover is the near simultaneous ignition of all combustible material in an enclosed area.

Flashover may also refer to:

- Arc flash, also known as a flashover, an electric arc between exposed commutator segments in a motor or generator
- Flashover Recordings, a trance music record label
- Sympathetic detonation, or flashover, detonation of an explosive charge by a nearby explosion
- "Flashover", a song by Enhypen from Desire: Unleash, 2025
- Flashover (film), a 2023 Chinese disaster film directed by Peng Shun of the Pang Brothers
