= Murder of Karen Stitt =

Murdered teenager

Karen Stitt
- Born: July 25, 1967; Pittsburgh, Pennsylvania, U.S.
- Died: September 3, 1982 (aged 15); Sunnyvale, California, U.S.
- Parent(s): Robert Stitt and Kathryn Lesheski

Karen Stitt, a 15-year-old American student at Palo Alto High School, was brutally raped and stabbed to death in Sunnyvale, California, on September 3, 1982. Karen’s ashes were spread over Mount Tamalpais in Mill Valley, California by her older sister, Suzanne. Stitt’s murder went unsolved for nearly 40 years until forensic genealogy, the same technology used to catch the Golden State Killer, helped authorities identify her alleged killer, Gary Gene Ramirez. On August 2, 2022, Ramirez was arrested for Stitt's killing. The arrest took place at his home in Makawao on the Island of Maui, Hawaii. He was convicted of first degree murder in 2025, and sentenced to life in prison.

== Murder ==
On September 2, 1982, Stitt took a local bus to visit her boyfriend in Sunnyvale. After spending the evening together, Stitt's boyfriend walked her to the bus stop for the trip home around midnight. Later that morning, her nude body was found dumped at the base of a wall of a nearby business by a delivery truck driver. Stitt's wrists were bound with her shirt and her jacket was tied around her left ankle. She had been raped and had been stabbed 59 times.

== Investigation ==
Stitt's murder went unsolved for nearly 40 years. Stitt's boyfriend was considered a suspect but was eventually cleared by forensic DNA analysis in the early 2000s. In 2019, a detective with the Sunnyvale Department of Public Safety began working with an expert in investigative genetic genealogy to identify the perpetrator. In 2021, the genealogist told authorities that the killer was likely one of four brothers from Fresno, California. Gary Gene Ramirez was one of them.

In April 2022, the Sunnyvale detective obtained a DNA sample from a child of Gary Ramirez. The DNA revealed there was a "high probability" that the child's father was the killer. On August 2, 2022, the 75-year-old Ramirez was arrested at his home in Makawao on the Island of Maui, Hawaii. On August 10, 2022, Gary Ramirez appeared in court in Maui and agreed to be extradited to Santa Clara County, California.

On February 24, 2025, Ramirez was convicted in the Santa Clara County Superior Court for killing Stitt after pleading no contest to first-degree murder. He was sentenced to life in prison with the possibility of parole in 25 years.
