= Carole Cole (disambiguation) =

Carole Cole (1944–2009) was an American actress and music producer.

Carole Cole may also refer to:

- Carol Cole (1963–1980), American murder victim
- Carroll Cole (1938–1985), American serial killer
