= Into the Fire =

Into the Fire may refer to:

== Film ==
- Into the Fire (1988 film), a 1988 thriller film directed by Graeme Campbell
- Into the Fire (1989 film), a 1989 Hong Kong film produced by Sammo Hung
- Into the Fire (2005 film), a 2005 film directed by Michael Phelan
- Into the Fire (2007 film), a 2007 documentary film directed by Bill Couturié
- 71: Into the Fire, a 2010 Korean War film directed by John H. Lee

== Television ==
=== Episodes ===
- "Into the Fire" (Babylon 5), an episode of the science-fiction television series Babylon 5
- "Into the Fire" (Stargate SG-1), an episode of the television series Stargate SG-1

=== Series ===
- Into the Fire (TV series), a 1996 British television series, written by Tony Marchant
- Into the Fire, a 2018 documentary series following the varied callouts of West Midlands Fire Service
- Into the Fire: The Lost Daughter, a 2024 true crime two-part miniseries directed by Ryan White, about the murder of Aundria Bowman

== Music ==
- Into the Fire (album), a 1987 album by Bryan Adams, also a song on the same album
- "Into the Fire" (Sarah McLachlan song), a song by Sarah McLachlan from her 1991 album Solace
- "Into the Fire" (Thirteen Senses song), a song by Thirteen Senses from their 2004 album The Invitation
- "Into the Fire", a song by Bruce Springsteen from his 2002 album The Rising
- "Into the Fire" (Dokken song), a song by Dokken from their 1984 album Tooth and Nail
- "Into the Fire", a song by Brainstorm from their 1998 album Unholy
- "Into the Fire", a song by Deep Purple from their 1970 album Deep Purple in Rock
- "Into the Fire", a song by Firewind from their 2008 album The Premonition
- "Into the Fire", a song by Marilyn Manson from their 2009 album The High End of Low
- "Into the Fire", a song by Primal Fear from their 2018 album Apocalypse
- "Into the Fire", a song by Running Wild from their 2000 album Victory
- "Into the Fire", a song by Sabaton from their 2005 album Primo Victoria
- "Into the Fire", a song from the musical The Scarlet Pimpernel
- "Into the Fire" (Asking Alexandria song), a 2017 song by Asking Alexandria

== Other uses ==
- Into The Fire!, Part three of "Who Killed Gwen Reilly?", a 2009 chapter of graphic novel The Spectacular Spider-Girl
- NWA Into the Fire, a professional wrestling pay-per-view event
