= Mack W. Ford =

American Baptist pastor (1932–2015)

- Born: March 18, 1932; Wyatt, Jackson Parish; Louisiana, US
- Died: February 13, 2015 (aged 82); Arcadia, Louisiana
- Occupations: Child and teen home operator, Independent Baptist evangelist and pastor
- Spouse: Thelma Marie Dark

Mack W. Ford (March 18, 1932 – February 13, 2015) was an American fundamentalist Independent Baptist preacher and the founder of teen homes in the American South, most notably New Bethany Home for Girls in Arcadia, Louisiana. The operation of those teen homes was controversial due to allegations against Ford and school staff members of physical abuse, such as beating, and sexual abuse, including rape.

== New Bethany Home for Girls ==
Ford founded the New Bethany Home for Girls in 1971. During the decades of New Bethany's operations, reports of children being beaten and mentally abused. Ford was also accused of molesting and raping multiple students during the decades of the school's operation. One former student accused Ford of raping her in 1977.

Ford opened a home for boys in Longstreet, Louisiana shortly after New Bethany Home for Girls opened. The home for boys in Longstreet closed in 1981 after the home's manager, L.D. Rapier, was charged with child abuse. The charges against Rapier were eventually dropped. Ford later moved the home from the old location in Longstreet to a new location in Walterboro, South Carolina in 1982. The home for boys in Walterboro closed in 1984 after two administrative staff members, Olin King and Robert King, were charged with child abuse and neglect. The abuse and neglect charges were dropped, but they pleaded no contest to a false imprisonment charge.

Carol Cole, who was murdered at the age of 17 and found in Bossier Parish in 1981, in an unsolved murder case, may have been a student at New Bethany for a period of time, although no conclusive evidence has proven that Cole was ever a student at New Bethany.

In 1977, evidence of abuse was sent to a grand jury, but no indictments were made, after the first investigation of the New Bethany Home for Girls school.

A woman formerly known as Shannon Scott claims Ford coerced her into having sexual contact with him against her will. Scott recorded an interview on tape documenting the claims of sexual abuse.

A blog claims that a student at New Bethany Home for Girls recorded sexual abuse committed by Ford on tape. The blog claims former Louisiana College executive vice president Timothy Johnson knew about a sexual abuse complaint from a student but failed to contact law enforcement.

Ford closed the New Bethany Home for Girls in 2001.

In January 2015, a grand jury declined to indict Ford for sexual abuse.

== Death ==
Ford died on February 13, 2015, at the age of 82, from a heart attack.
