= Into the Fire: The Lost Daughter =

2024 documentary series

- Genre: Documentary
- Based on: Murder of Aundria Bowman
- Directed by: Ryan White
- Music by: Blake Neely
- Country of origin: United States
- Original language: English
- No. of episodes: 2

Production
- Executive producers: Nile Cappello; A.J. Dix; Beth Kono
- Producers: Jessica Hargrave; Charlize Theron; Ryan White
- Cinematography: John Benam
- Editor: Berenice Chavez
- Running time: 151 minutes
- Production companies: Denver and Delilah Productions; Tripod Media

Original release
- Network: Netflix
- Release: September 12, 2024

Into the Fire: The Lost Daughter is an American two-part true crime documentary series that premiered on Netflix in September 2024. Directed by Ryan White and produced by Jessica Hargrave, Charlize Theron, and Matt Maher, the series delves into the harrowing journey of Cathy Terkanian as she seeks answers about her biological daughter, Aundria Bowman, who disappeared in 1989.

== Premise ==
A mother goes ahead with a relentless pursuit of unveiling the facts of the case involving the disappearance of Aundria Bowman that took place way back in 1989. Cathy conducted her research with the help of Carl Koppelman, a websleuth who obtained facts about Aundria's life with the Bowmans. Before her disappearance, Aundria alleged that she was sexually abused by her adopted father, Dennis Bowman. However, this case remained a mystery for many years.

In 2019, Dennis Bowman was arrested in regards to an unsolved case from the past. During the course of his arrest and interrogation, he confessed to murdering Aundria soon after her disappearance and hiding her body in the backyard of their house.

== Appearing in documentary ==
- Richard Baxter
- Linda Berens
- Ava Brandt
- Chase Cargill
- Samantha Desman
- Craig Engweiler
- Sue Eyler Engweiler
- Bryan Fuller
- Grace Guadagnino
- Chris Haverdink
- Jennifer Kempker Jones
- Bonnie Hellman
- Les Mahoney
- Moxie Owens
- Alessandro Mannone
- Kim Payne Helder
- Alaska Renee
- Michelle Lampkin Timmer
- Richard Page

== Episodes ==
No.	Title	Directed by	Original release date
1	"Part One"	Ryan White	September 12, 2024
In 1974, at the age of 16, Cathy Terkanian gave birth to Alexis Badger. Due to familial pressures, she placed Alexis up for adoption when the child was about 10 months old. Alexis was adopted by Dennis and Brenda Bowman and was renamed Aundria Bowman. Some 36 years later Cathy, now a retired nurse, discovers that her birth daughter, Aundria Bowman, who she once placed on adoption, has been missing for years. Her pursuit of the truth uncovers a shocking suspect.
2	"Part Two"	Ryan White	September 12, 2024
Following an unexpected arrest in a decades-old cold case, Cathy moves closer to discovering the truth about her daughter's fate.

== Production ==
Into the Fire: The Lost Daughter was directed by Ryan White, known for his work on Pamela, a Love Story and The Keepers. It was produced by White, Jessica Hargrave, Charlize Theron, and Matt Maher.

The documentary's cinematographers were John Benam, Arlene Nelson, and Dominique Hessert-Owens. The production involved research and interviews to depict Cathy Terkanian's efforts to uncover the truth about her daughter, Aundria Bowman.

== Release ==
On August 15, 2024, a trailer was released for the series, featuring segments from the documentary. Into the Fire: The Lost Daughters was released on Netflix on September 12, 2024.

== Critical reception ==
On the review aggregator website Rotten Tomatoes "Into the Fire: The Lost Daughter" holds a 92% approval rating from four critics. Reviews generally praised its emotional storytelling and investigative approach, with attention given to Cathy Terkanian's search for answers about her daughter's disappearance.

Lucy Mangan of The Guardian awarded the series a 4 out of 5 rating, praising its narration on how Cathy Terkanian tried to look into the disappearance of her daughter. Mangan noted the fact that though the series focuses on mothers' intuitions at times, the fact that there was such a situation involving the disappearance of Aundria makes the documentary more credible." Joel Keller of Decider noted that the documentary series does a good job at portraying the journey of Cathy Terkanian trying to find out what happened to her missing daughter. He described Terkanian as the strongest point of the documentary and commended Ryan White's direction.
