= Flashover (film) =

2023 Chinese disaster film

Chinese name
- Traditional Chinese: 惊天救援
- Simplified Chinese: 惊天救援
- Literal meaning: Shocking rescue
Transcriptions
- Starring: Du Jiang; Wang Qianyuan; Tong Liya; Han Xue; Yu Haoming; Han Dongjun; Wang Ge
- Production company: Universe Entertainment
- Distributed by: Universe Films
- Release date: April 28, 2023 (China)
- Running time: 115 minutes
- Country: China
- Language: Mandarin

Flashover (Chinese: 惊天救援) is a 2023 Chinese disaster film directed by Peng Shun of the Pang Brothers and stars Du Jiang, Wang Qianyuan, Tong Liya, Han Xue, Yu Haoming, Han Dongjun, and Wang Ge. The film tells the story of firefighters carrying out a rescue operation at a chemical plant.

It was released in China on April 28, 2023.

== Cast ==
- Du Jiang as Han Kai, Communications Officer
- Wang Qianyuan as Zhao Yingqi, Station Chief
- Tong Liya as Ye Xin
- Han Xue as Zhang Hong, Primary School Teacher, fiancée of Station Chief Zhao
- Yu Haoming as Liu Zitao, Deputy Station Chief
- Han Dongjun as Xiao Wu, Training Model
- Wang Ge as Wang Wenbin
- Yin Xiaotian as Li Quan
- Zhang Yang as Shi Qing
- Li Guangfu as Wang Wenbin's Father
- Jiang Mengjie as Zheng Wen
- Hu Jun as Secretary
- Xu Zhengxi as Qi Ming
- Luo Jialiang as Sun Yang
- Su Yan as Yuan Ping
- Ding Haifeng as Liu Yong
- Zheng Zhongyu as Wang Zhigang
- Zhang Yilun as Zheng Fengxi
- Sun Shubo as Fang Jun
- Zhang Junjie as Ma Boru
- Liu Yanxi as Wang Guozhong
- Zhang Xun as Su Hai
- Zhao Bin as Dong Song
- Ma Yaoyao as Xiao Xiao
- Zhou Huilin as Sun Fuwei
- Chen Qicong as Wang Wenbin's Mother
- Li Yu as Lü Fang
- Zhang Fan as Zhang Tuo
- Zhang Yan as Feng Zhengde
- Zhu Haijun as Peng Shuda
- Wang Gongyi as Jiang Rongqing
- Qiao Minglin as Guo Anren
- Tang Qirong as Tang Jixuan
- Liu Difei as Li Jun
- Yao Qingren as Liu Fei
- Zhong Lei as Li Qin
- Zhao Chengshun as Director Yang
- Luan Mingyuan as Liu Hong
- Chang Qian as Zhou Yan
- Yan Yixin as Wei Lin
- Wang Ruoshan as An An
- Han Haoxuan as Teacher Liu
- Cai Hailong as Xiao Lin
- Ning Xin as Xiao Lin's Sister
- Lin Yanrou as Li Yanrou
- Han Wenliang as Mao Jun
- Yang Kexin as Uncle Hua
- Yan Peng as Liu Ganze
- Geng Yizhan as Xiao Bo
- Wang Yining as Wang Xuan
- Ning Nan as Zheng Tie
- Sun Zhongjia as Liu Yu
- Jiang Shiyi as Xiao Jiujiu
- Jiang Shiqi as Female Anchor
- Zhang Zeyang as Hu Zhengxiong
- Zhang Zheng as Old Zhang
- Wang Shudan as Huang Dan
- Zhu Jun as Xiao Teng
- Wang Chenyao as Dou Dou
- Yin Xishan as Liu Junchen
- September as Cao Yuxuan
- October as Wen Hao
- Shan Wenxin as Nuan Nuan
- Li Xinyang as Deputy Captain Zhang
- Zhu Jian as Deputy Mayor and Public Security Bureau Chief of Guancheng City
- Huang Xiaojun as Director of the Ecology and Environment Bureau of Guancheng City
- Meng Xiangguo as Firefighting Rescue Expert
- Shi Qiang as Environmental Protection Expert
- Yang Hanbin as Director of the Command Center
- Zhang Liangliang as Reporter
- Liu Lei as Reporter
- Quan Ziyu as Reporter
- Bai Biyao as Reporter
- Zheng Jiajia as Reporter
- Zhang Tianyu as Reporter
- Cao Yidan plays a nurse
- Liu Yuhan plays a nurse
- Xu Weiqi plays a nurse
- Zhang Ling plays a nurse
- Zhou Shanyu plays a doctor
- Han Minlin plays a doctor
- Peng Lin plays a driver
- Zhang Feng'an plays a worker
- Sun Fanweiyu plays a 4-year-old girl
- Cai Yuexing plays a truck driver
- Huang Zun plays a truck worker

== Music ==
No.	Title	Lyrics	Music	Singer	Length
1.	""Farewell"" (Theme Song)	Wen Lang	Qu Ziqian	Zhang Bichen
2.	""I Am an Ordinary Firefighter"" (Promotional Song)	Wang Bo	Wang Bo	Wang Bo, Du Jiang, Wang Qianyuan, Yu Haoming, etc.
3.	""Lights of Thousands of Homes, Galaxies on Earth"" (Promotional Song)	Wen Lang	Qu Ziqian	Yi Liyuan

== Production ==
On October 9, 2020, the crew officially started filming in Gaoyou City, Jiangsu Province, and wrapped up in December of the same year. The production company Asia-Pacific Huaying previously produced the films The Bravest and Chinese Pilot, while Universe Entertainment previously produced Shock Wave and The White Storm. Director Peng Shun previously directed mainland China's first firefighting-themed film Into the Fire, and Du Jiang plays a firefighter for the second time after The Bravest.
