= Murders of Dean and Tina Clouse =

American murder victims (1980, identified 2021)

Dean Clouse
- Home photo of Tina, Holly Marie, and Dean Clouse
- Born: Harold Dean Clouse Jr. June 7, 1959
- Disappeared: c. December 1980; Lewisville, Texas
- Status: Identified on January 12, 2021 (40 years after discovery)
- Died: December 1980 (aged 21)
- Cause of death: Homicide (blunt trauma)
- Body discovered: January 12, 1981; Houston, Texas
- Resting place: Harris County Cemetery #2
- Other name: "Harris County John Doe"
- Spouse: Tina Linn Clouse (m. 1979)
- Children: 1

Harold Dean Clouse Jr. and Tina Linn Clouse, were a pair of long-unidentified murder victims found outside of Houston, Texas in January, 1981. After moving in the summer of 1980 with their infant daughter, Holly Marie, from Volusia County, Florida to Lewisville, Texas, the Clouses stopped contacting their families in October 1980. Their remains were found in a wooded area north of Houston on January 12, 1981. The bodies were found within feet of each other, both significantly decomposed, with a post-mortem interval of approximately two months. Dean Clouse had been bound and beaten to death, and Tina Clouse was strangled. Holly Marie's remains were not found with or near her parents' remains. After the two bodies were not identified and the case grew cold, they were buried – as Harris County John Doe and Jane Doe – in anonymous graves, where they remained unidentified for 41 years. In 2011, the Clouses' bodies were exhumed for genetic testing. In 2021, forensic genealogists positively identified the "Harris County Does" as Dean and Tina Clouse, however, Holly Marie's whereabouts remained unaccounted for. In 2022, Holly Marie was located alive in Oklahoma, with no memory of the traumatic events of her infancy.

Tina Clouse
- Born: Tina Gail Linn; September 21, 1963
- Disappeared: c. December 1980; Lewisville, Texas
- Status: Identified on January 12, 2021 (40 years after discovery)
- Died: December 1980 (aged 17)
- Cause of death: Homicide (strangulation)
- Body discovered: January 12, 1981; Houston, Texas
- Resting place: Harris County Cemetery #2
- Other name: "Harris County Jane Doe"
- Spouse: Harold Dean Clouse Jr. (m. 1979)
- Children: 1

== Background ==
Harold Dean Clouse Jr. and Tina Gail Linn were both living with their families in New Smyrna Beach, Florida, when they met in 1978. Tina Linn was 15 years old and Dean Clouse Jr. was 19. Dean's sister was already dating Tina's brother, who also later married. Dean and Tina had what was described by those around them as a "whirlwind romance", and married a short time later at the Volusia County Courthouse on June 25, 1979. The couple's daughter, Holly Marie, was born on January 24, 1980. Both were described as devoted parents by those around them.

In the summer of 1980, the Clouses moved with baby Holly to the suburb of Lewisville, Texas, in the Dallas metropolitan area. In the early 1980s, the Dallas-Fort Worth area was rapidly developing, creating a construction boom. Dean was an adept cabinet maker, and moved his family to Texas in hopes of finding a good job in the trade. Dean found work with D. R. Horton homebuilders, and the young family lived with Dean's cousin to save for their own home. Holly was one year old at the time of the move. Although work at the time was not stable, no one who knew them reported any tensions between the two.

== Death and discovery ==
Dean and Tina fell out of contact with their families around late October 1980, only a few months after their relocation to Texas. It is believed that their murders occurred between October 1980 and several weeks before their decaying bodies were found on January 12, 1981. The Clouses were last seen alive in Lewisville, Texas. It is still unknown how they came to be where they were found, in undeveloped and swampy woodlands north of Houston, 250 miles from their last confirmed address. After several months had passed without contact from them, in 1981 Dean's mother, Donna Casasanta, reported the couple as missing. However, there was little effort put into the investigation by the police who strongly believed that the young family had deliberately cut off contact, citing the mysterious return of their car to Florida by members of an unidentified nomadic religious group. Their families made grassroots efforts to locate the missing pair, but none led to concrete developments. One such effort taken by the Linn family was to report the Clouses as missing to the Salvation Army, who sometimes keep track of disappearances, but nothing on the Clouses from the Salvation Army's database entered federal databases of missing people.

=== Bodies discovered ===
The then-unidentified bodies of the Clouses were found on January 12, 1981, in northern Harris County, Texas, in a boggy, wooded area just north of the Houston city limits. A civilian's dog let to wander into the woods returned to its owner with a decomposing human arm. Search parties prompted by the dog's discovery subsequently found two heavily decomposed bodies near Wallisville Road. The bodies, who pathologists determined were likely older teenagers, were found within a few feet of each other, and assumed to have been killed at approximately the same time, leading investigators to believe the two bodies were a double homicide. Both had been dead for anywhere between a week to two months, heavily decayed, with the male body already having been partially skeletonized. However, their faces were still recognizable enough for a reconstruction to be drawn of each. Despite significant decomposition, it was determined that both were victims of homicide. The female had been strangled, and the male had been bound and gagged before being beaten to death. It is believed that the female victim had been attacked first, and the male victim attacked for attempting to defend her. It was unclear if they had been killed where they were found, or if they had been taken there afterwards. Also recovered at the scene was a bloodied towel and a pair of gym shorts.

== Investigation into the identities of the Harris County Does ==
=== Initial investigation ===
Further investigation turned up very few leads beyond what was gathered from the scene. Initial theories speculated that the female victim was attacked first and that the male victim had been killed while defending her. Harris County forensic artist Mary Mize drew the initial facial reconstructions of both victims, but the reconstructions failed to generate any leads, now known to be because the Clouses had not yet built roots in Texas at the time of their deaths. As they were unidentified at the time, the "Does" were buried in Harris County Cemetery #2. Even after the victims were properly identified, no arrests have ever been made for their murders.

=== Cold case investigation ===
The bodies were exhumed in July 2011 to extract DNA, originally to find out if they were related. The funding for exhumation was acquired when Harris County received a grant from the National Institute of Justice to exhume several unidentified murder victims, including the Clouses, to extract their DNA and enter it into databases. Jennifer Love, forensic anthropology director of the identification unit in the Harris County medical examiner's office, was put in charge of the exhumation. Funding for continued genealogical research into the Harris County Does was then secured from the true crime podcast company Audiochuck.

== Identification ==
The case of identifying the Does was given to California-based genetic genealogy organization Identifinders International in late 2020. Using Gedmatch as the genetic database they searched, forensic genealogists Misty Gillis and Allison Peacock were tasked with identifying them. Gillis focused on tracing the man's genetics, and Peacock focused on tracing the female. The male's DNA generated multiple distant matches in Kentucky, which led Gillis to a Kentucky family with the surname Clouse who had relocated to Florida. Gillis continued to follow the Clouse family's genealogy until she found an extremely close match with the male. Peacock, acting as representative for both her and Gillis, called Debbie Brooks, Dean's sister, and asked if there was a member of her family who had disappeared 40 years or more ago. Brooks then provided Peacock and Gillis with information about Dean, leading to Dean Clouse Jr. being identified within 10 days of Peacock and Gillis beginning his case. Tina Clouse was then identified shortly after, leading to both of the Harris County Does to be identified within several weeks of their cases being reopened.

Dean and Tina Clouse were publicly identified by the Texas Attorney General's cold case unit on 12 January 2021, on the 40th anniversary of the discovery of their remains. Until then, Donna Casasanta had reportedly been hopeful that her son was still alive. Following the identifications, Peacock continued to work on the case as the Clouse family's public relations and advocate.

Families of both decedents traveled to Houston to see the place where the bodies were found, and their gravesites. According to Les Linn, Tina's brother, both families agreed to have the couple buried together.

== Disappearance of Holly Marie Clouse ==
After Dean and Tina's bodies were identified, the investigation's primary focus turned to finding their missing daughter. No baby's body was discovered with or near the couple's remains, and no baby Doe cases that fit Holly Marie's circumstances had ever surfaced. It is reported that when Peacock delivered news of the findings to the Clouse family, Debbie Brooks asked if the investigators had found the baby, to which Peacock responded, “What baby?”

Several theories about Holly Marie's whereabouts were put forward, including theories that her small body had been carried away by scavenging animals, or that investigators missed her at the scene. Another increasingly popular theory was that the baby had been kidnapped by the killers, which became the general consensus after Holly Marie was recovered alive. It is now known that Holly Marie was left at a church in Arizona shortly after her parents’ murders, and that she was left by two white-robed and barefoot women claiming to be a part of a nomadic religious group.

Allison Peacock and her organization FHD Forensics, along with the Clouse and Linn families continued to search for Holly Marie. Peacock launched the Hope For Holly DNA Project as part of their efforts. Information on Holly's case was released to the public, including that her last known whereabouts were Lewisville, Texas. An age progression image made by the National Center for Missing and Exploited Children was also made to be distributed to the press, and several family members submitted DNA samples to genealogy websites such as Ancestry.com in hopes of matching with Holly Marie. Several women from across the country wrote to Peacock that they might be Holly, and Peacock tested and ruled out several women who fit the circumstances but were hesitant to work with law enforcement.

=== Recovery of Holly Marie Clouse ===
Holly Marie was found alive in Oklahoma at 42 years old on 7 June 2022, which was also coincidentally Dean's birthday. While the search for Holly Marie was ongoing, it was hypothesized that if she were to be alive, she would not be aware of her identity or past, which proved to be correct. When investigators in 2022 found that her birth relatives had different recollections of how her name was spelled, Hollie or Holly, their request for her birth certificate led to a breakthrough; they found that it had been sealed due to an adoption, which successfully led to her adoptive parents – and Holly herself.

While few details of Holly Marie's life have been released out of respect for her privacy, it has been reported that she has led a satisfactory life, with a 20-year marriage, five children and two young grandchildren. Details of her childhood are also being kept confidential due to the investigation into her parents' deaths being an active case, but it has been stated that her adoptive family was never considered suspect in her case. The church that took Holly in had adopted her to a family, and both the church and the family were unaware of how Holly had come to be in the possession of the church and nomadic group. Holly Marie met with her biological family over Zoom the same day she was found, and NCMEC helped to fund a visit to Florida in November, 2022 so she could meet them in person. In a 2023 interview with ABC, it was revealed that Holly Marie's adoptive father, Philip McGoldrick, was the pastor at the church where Holly Marie was left as a baby. McGoldrick has said that the two women who left Holly Marie also gave him Holly Marie's birth certificate, as well as a note reportedly written by Dean Clouse that waived parental rights to Holly Marie.

=== Family advocacy efforts ===
After her safe recovery, the Hope for Holly Project was renamed the Dean and Tina Linn Clouse Memorial Fund, shifting the focus to identifying other unidentified decedents. A few months later, in October, 2022 growth of the memorial fund led to the establishment of a 501(c)3 charitable organization, Genealogy For Justice, with members of the Clouse and Linn family, as well as genealogist Peacock acting as advisors. In the memorial fund's first sponsored case, Wilkes County, North Carolina native Virginia Higgins Ray was identified as a 1982 Columbia, South Carolina Jane Doe on Mother's Day, 2023.

== Ongoing investigation ==
The investigation into the Clouse murders is still considered an active criminal case, according to Harris County Police Deputy Thomas Gilliland. Due to the active status of the case, news about it is partially restricted. The focus of the investigation has since turned to finding the parents' killers, while the publicity surrounding Holly's return generated an increase in new leads to the Texas Attorney General's cold case unit.

=== Religious group ===
In the 1970s, “Jesus freak” movements were common, and the structure of these movements could be favorable conditions for the formation of cults. However, they were decreasing in relevance by the 1980s. According to his family, Dean had a history of interacting with such movements during his teenage years, but drifted away from them after meeting Tina Linn.

During December 1980, and what is now known to be close to the time of the murders, a woman who introduced herself as “Sister Susan” reached out to the family of the couple in Florida, claiming to be interested in returning the couple's car. By that time, Dean and Tina had already been out of contact for more than several weeks. The family agreed to meet Sister Susan and several other members of her religious group at the Daytona international Speedway in Daytona, Florida. Multiple elements about the meeting did not make sense to the attending family members. The religious group arranged for the meeting to be at night. During the meeting, though multiple members of the group were present, only Sister Susan spoke. The attending family members were told that Dean and Tina had joined their religious group and no longer wished to have worldly contact with their families. The group then asked Donna Casasanta to donate $1,000 to them. Police were notified of the meeting in advance, but no formal police report for the incident has been uncovered.

When Donna Casasanta later tried to report Dean as missing to the authorities, her claim was quickly dismissed as him having joined the religious group as Sister Susan had said, with the police citing the return of the car as proof that Dean's disappearance was voluntary. The couple's families said that they never found it believable that the couple would join a cult, and it is now believed that the car was intentionally returned to lessen the chances of a formal investigation.

It is believed that the religious group that returned the car is also the same group that left Holly at the church in Arizona. This group was observed living nomadically around the Southwest United States. Their beliefs involved male and female separation, as well as vegetarianism and not using leather goods. It also claimed to have left another baby before, at a laundromat.

In 2023, it was revealed that the religious group in question was the Christ Family, a nomadic group founded by Charles Franklin "Lightning Amen" McHugh. In a November 2023 interview with ABC on 20/20, Holly Clouse said that she believes the religious cult her parents were involved with may have murdered them because they wanted to leave the group.

== See also ==
- Murder of Michelle Garvey, as an unidentified victim, Michelle was buried near the then-unnamed Clouses in Harris County Cemetery #2, before being moved to Connecticut after she was identified in 2014
- Murders of Pamela Buckley and James Freund, another formerly unidentified young couple
- Unidentified decedent
