= Nucleus Gene =

Genetic testing company in China

Nucleus Gene Technology Co., Ltd.
- Native name: 深圳市核子基因科技有限公司
- Company type: Private
- Industry: BioTech
- Founded: 2012-04-27
- Founder: Zhang Hezi; Ba Ying
- Headquarters: Shenzhen, China
- Key people: Zhang Hezi (chairman)
- Services: Forensic DNA analysis; Genetic testing
- Website: www.ngdna.com

Nucleus Gene Technology Co., Ltd., or Nucleus Gene Group was established in 2012 and headquartered in Shenzhen. Nucleus Gene is a Chinese enterprise engaged in the research and application of genetic testing and medical testing. It received media attention due to the problematic COVID-19 PCR test kits from one of its subsidiaries.

== History ==
Nucleus Gene was founded by Zhang Hezi and his wife Ba Ying, both graduates of China Medical University. Zhang obtained a master's degree in forensic science. After graduation he worked at the Shenzhen Municipal Public Security Bureau and played a role in establishing its DNA profiling center. Ba Ying worked in Shenzhen Second People's Hospital as an attending physician after her graduation. The couple tried to start a business around 2000, venturing into various industries such as interior decoration, real estate, and retail. In 2012, the couple founded Nucleus Gene Technology Co. in Shenzhen.

In 2013, Nucleus Gene established its first medical laboratory in Shenzhen that has obtained the forensic appraisal accreditation issued by the Ministry of Justice. Since then, the company has been opening 3-4 new laboratories nationwide annually.

In 2016, Nucleus Gene launched an expansion plan aiming to establish 100 state-licensed laboratories nationwide and a network of 10,000 "health centers." These centers would offer personalized genetic testing and health consultations based on the results, as well as DNA paternity testing services.

After the COVID-19 outbreak in early 2020, Nucleus Gene shifted its business focus to PCR testing services. In November 2022, the company's official website stated that it had conducted over 700 million COVID-19 PCR tests across 45 cities for a continuous period of more than 800 days. In 2022 alone, Nucleus Gene established 16 new medical testing laboratories nationwide, primarily focusing on COVID-19 PCR testing services.

In early January 2023, Nucleus Gene dissolved and closed 3 subsidiaries running testing laboratories in Dalian, Qingdao, and Quanzhou.

On June 15, 2023, Nucleus Gene amended its company registration information, adding "non-residential real estate leasing" to its business scope.

== Business model ==
Nucleus Gene's core businesses include forensic DNA analysis, genetic testing, medical research supporting, and personal health management solutions.

The company initially conducted forensic appraisals for judicial authorities. It subsequently launched consumer-grade genetic testing services, including "talent assessments" based on genetic analysis and children's DNA paternity testing. It recruited agents and franchisees to sell and market such services.

The core of the company's business began to shift toward COVID-19 PCR testing following the 2019 coronavirus disease outbreak. During the epidemic, Nucleus Gene has won multiple government bids to provide PCR testing services for schools, government departments, and some hotels. The company also invested in the construction of testing kiosks, establishing 320 such facilities in various municipal districts of Tianjin. These kiosks offered convenient and accessible COVID-19 testing services to the public.

== Controversies ==
=== COVID testing error ===
In November 2022, the Health Commission of Lanzhou announced that staffers with Lanzhou Nucleus Huaxi Laboratory, Nucleus Gene's local subsidiary, wrongfully counted certain abnormal test results in a tally of negative results and uploaded them into the working system. Nucleus Gene's laboratories in Xingtai, Jinan, Changsha, and Shenzhen have been hit with local fines since 2020, for issues related to testing results or other operational violations.

The Chinese government adopted zero-COVID strategy which included frequent PCR testing and strict quarantine policies, investing huge amounts of public health resources for it. Errors and omissions in PCR testing have led the public to question whether there is collusion between testing contractors and government officials.

=== Advertising ===
In 2019, a TV crew work for a channel under Hunan Broadcasting System conducted an undercover investigation at a Nucleus Gene "Health Center" franchise in Changsha, focusing on their "talent gene assessment" service. Subsequently, the program invited experts to expose the sales representatives' false claims about the service. Following that, the local market regulatory department launched an investigation into the company for allegedly engaging in false advertising and violating advertising regulations.
