= Murder of Cynthia Gastelle =

Formerly unidentified American murder victim

Cynthia Gastelle
- Portrait of Gastelle
- Born: September 4, 1961; Washington, D.C., U.S.
- Disappeared: April 1980; Takoma Park, Maryland, U.S.
- Status: Remains identified after 32 years
- Died: c. April 1980 (aged 18); Prince William County, Virginia, U.S.
- Cause of death: Homicide by stabbing
- Body discovered: February 11, 1982

Cynthia "Cindy" Gastelle (September 4, 1961 – c. April 1980) was a formerly unidentified American murder victim who disappeared on April 3, 1980. Her body was found two years later, but remained unidentified for 30 years before the matching of mitochondrial DNA entered into the national DNA database provided her identity.

== Circumstances ==
Cynthia Gastelle, a recent high school graduate, was last seen heading to a job interview at a deli in Takoma Park, Maryland. She had left home around 10:30 and had boarded a Ride On bus to Silver Spring, according to her brother Peter Gastelle. Though Cynthia Gastelle was supposed to go to two job interviews, she only arrived at one of them. Gastelle never returned home that day. She had run away twice before and had also attempted unsuccessfully to change her identity, so her family waited a few days before reporting her missing. However, her family did not indicate that she was currently in trouble at the time of her disappearance.

Gastelle's skeletal remains were found by a hiker approximately 45 miles (72 km) from her Takoma Park home on February 11, 1982, upon Bull Run Mountain in Haymarket, Virginia; they were located on private property in what was then a secluded wooded area, nearly a mile off U.S. Route 15. At the time, forensic technology was not advanced enough for investigators to determine how the unidentified remains had gotten there or if it was a homicide. However, the case is now being investigated as a homicide after recent examinations revealed the decedent had sustained injuries consistent with stabbing. The skeleton had clothing on it, which could have been recognized by Gastelle's family. However, the Prince William County Police Department was unaware that Gastelle was missing, so they never contacted the Takoma Park Police Department. The remains eventually became Jane Doe.

== Identification ==
Over the years, Gastelle's father would be called to examine remains and visit morgues, according to her brother Greg Gastelle. Gastelle would eventually be added to NamUs and the Doe Network. However, neither her dental X-rays nor DNA was included on both sites, which made comparisons between her and unidentified decedents challenging. In 2001, DNA evidence from the Jane Doe was entered into the national DNA database. In 2011, DNA samples from Gastelle's family were collected from an unrelated case elsewhere. That same year, a user on Websleuths noted that Gastelle was not on NamUs exclusion list for Jane Doe. The Takoma Park police were contacted in February 2011 to make a comparison between her and Jane Doe, which was initiated that July. It was revealed in June 2012 that a match had been made via mitochondrial DNA. Gastelle's identification was preceded by the death of her mother, Mary, in 1993 and her father, Terence, in 2001.

Following Gastelle's identification, the investigation is now focused on finding Gastelle's killer. Detectives have stated an aim to speak to Gastelle's boyfriend at the time, whose first name is Micheal, but have made it clear that he is not considered a suspect. As of 2012, detectives were unable to locate Micheal. Investigators are also looking to understand how Gastelle's remains ended up in Virginia, as she was not known to have any ties to Prince William County. It is believed that Gastelle, who could not drive, did not go there of her own volition but was instead driven there by someone else. It has not been stated whether this likely occurred before or after her death.

== See also ==
- List of solved missing person cases: 1950–1999
