= Murder of David Stack =

Formerly unidentified American murder victim

David Stack
- Yearbook picture of David Stack, circa 1975
- Born: David Arthur Stack; July 5, 1957
- Died: June 9, 1976 (aged 18); Tooele County, Utah
- Cause of death: Homicide by firearm
- Body discovered: June 10, 1976
- Resting place: Tooele City Cemetery, Tooele County, Utah (formerly)
- Other name: Tooele County John Doe
- Citizenship: United States
- Known for: Former unidentified decedent

David Arthur Stack (July 5, 1957 – June 9, 1976) was an American man who was murdered while hitchhiking from his home in Broomfield, Colorado to California. Stack was murdered by an unknown assailant or assailants in Wendover, Utah. His body was found approximately one day after his murder in a landfill in rural Tooele County, although he remained an unidentified decedent for 39 years until 2015 when his body was identified via a comparison of both dental records and genetic testing.

== Disappearance ==
Stack graduated from high school in 1975 and later decided to hitchhike, likely to visit relatives in California. He was last seen on June 1, 1976, at his residence in Broomfield, Colorado. After his departure, he was never seen again; the relatives who lived at his presumed destination had never witnessed his arrival.

While being treated as a missing person before his body was identified, Stack was excluded from thirteen other unidentified decedent cases.

== Discovery and examination ==
Reconstruction of the victim, created by the National Center for Missing & Exploited Children

A young man's body was discovered in a landfill in Tooele County, Utah on June 10, 1976. The victim was estimated to be between seventeen and twenty-two years of age, and had dark brown wavy hair that was shoulder-length with a faint mustache and beard, and brown eyes. He was clothed, wearing a tan or gray shirt, jeans with patches on the knees and a black belt. No footwear was present. He was estimated to be 5 ft 9 in (1.75 m) tall and at a weight of 170 pounds (77 kg) at the time of his death, and had O positive blood type (the most common). He was believed to have been seen alive in the nearby town of Wendover, Utah at approximately 3:00 PM, a day prior to the discovery of his body.

Distinctive features on the male were a white scar on his forehead, a vaccination scar on his left shoulder and another on his left wrist. On his right foot, he had hammer toe deformities, which may have been due to wearing tight-fitting shoes or possibly other reasons. After the examination of his body was complete, the young man was buried in the Tooele City Cemetery, after the case remained unsolved.

Stack's unidentified persons report was entered into the National Missing and Unidentified Persons Database in June 2010, where details of the case were released to the public in effort to identify him. This case was eventually reopened by law enforcement in 2014. The National Center for Missing & Exploited Children was also contacted by the Tooele County police department and created a forensic facial reconstruction of the subject by using mortuary photographs as an influence to create a likeness of his facial features. Subsequently, a poster was developed by the organization that was displayed to the public in hopes that he would be recognized by someone who may have known him in life. The cause of the victim's death was determined to have been two gunshot wounds to the head. This detail was not released to the public until a major break in the case developed.

== Identification ==
In May 2015, authorities announced a break in the case. Stack's dental records were noted to be very similar to the John Doe's. Police promptly stated that they were "confident" that the body was that of David Stack. The victim was exhumed to obtain DNA evidence to confirm if he was Stack and DNA was also collected from his surviving relatives for comparison. Results of the DNA tests were initially expected to take as long as six to eight months. However, it was reported on August 11, 2015, that the DNA tests matched both the unidentified body and David Stack's relatives, less than three months after the match through dental records was made. His body was stored in a morgue after his exhumation and would eventually be transported to his family for reburial. Authorities stated that one explanation why the potential match took years was because "communication between departments in other states" was not as advanced as it is today. Another reason was because the victim carried no form of identification.

Since he was identified, investigators hope that new details may emerge in the currently unsolved murder, as it is hoped subjects with knowledge about the circumstances of Stack's disappearance or murder will come forward with any information.

== See also ==
- Lists of solved missing person cases
- List of unsolved murders (1900–1979)
