= Killing of Carol Cole =

Formerly unidentified 1981 murder victim

Carol Cole
- Reconstruction created by the Louisiana State University FACES Lab (left) compared to an image of Carol Cole from 1978 (right)
- Born: Carol Ann Cole; November 5, 1963
- Died: December 1980 (aged 17)
- Cause of death: Homicide (stabbing)
- Body discovered: January 28, 1981
- Resting place: Maple Grove Cemetery, Comstock Township, Michigan
- Other names: Bossier Doe; Bossier's Doe; Cold Case No. 81-018329
- Citizenship: United States
- Known for: Murder victim

Carol Ann Cole (November 5, 1963 – December 1980; previously nicknamed as "Bossier Doe" or "Bossier's Doe" and officially known as Cold Case No. 81-018329) was a 17-year-old American homicide victim whose body was discovered in early 1981 in Bellevue, Bossier Parish, Louisiana. The victim remained unidentified until 2015, when DNA tests confirmed her identity. Cole, native to Kalamazoo, Michigan, had been missing from San Antonio, Texas since 1980. Cole's killing remains unsolved, although the investigation is continuing.

== Circumstances ==
Carol Cole and her sister Linda "Jeanie" Phelps lived in Kalamazoo, Michigan, primarily under the care of their grandmother after their mother and father divorced. Later in life, Cole decided to leave Kalamazoo to accompany her mother, Sue, to San Antonio, Texas in 1979 at age 15 but remained in contact with her sister by telephone. Cole was at a girl's home run by the Palmer Drug Abuse Program, also called PDAP, on West 23rd St. in Austin, Texas, from May to October 1980.

She continued to call and mail letters to her family, which eventually ceased in late December 1980. A location that Cole had stayed after leaving PDAP was traced by her grandmother in Kalamazoo to a home in Shreveport, Louisiana. Her grandmother called the residence where she was informed that Cole had departed to attend a party but she had never returned. Linda Phelps and her friend Patty Thorington continued to search for her, but were unsuccessful. Cole had been previously excluded as a possible identity of the victim by a medical examiner for unknown reasons.

Some sources state that Cole may have spent time at a religious institution known as the New Bethany School for Girls, which was located in Arcadia, Louisiana. Her sister noted that an image taken around the time of Cole's disappearance at the school depicted a group of girls sitting in pews, one of whom bore a strong resemblance to her sister.

Investigators have followed such leads. A woman claimed to have spent time with a girl that bore likeness to Cole but was unable to recall her name. Some also believe that the explanation for the names written on the victim's shoes as well as the style of clothing may have been due to a dress code set in place by the New Bethany School for Girls.

== Discovery ==
On January 28, 1981, a female victim's body, believed to be between the ages of 15 and 21, was found concealed by trees in Bellevue, Bossier Parish, Louisiana. The victim wore jeans, a white, long-sleeved shirt with pink, yellow, and blue stripes, a beige sweater with a hood, shoes with the names "Michael Brisco", "David", "Resha", and "D. Davies", white socks with blue and yellow streaks, white boxer briefs, a white bra and a leather belt with a buckle reading "Buffalo Nickel", with a buffalo design. None of the names on the clothing amounted to meaningful leads, although they were speculated to have belonged to companions of the Jane Doe. The victim had also painted her fingernails prior to her death. The shoes were later determined to have been size seven. A knife found in the soil near her remains is thought to have been the murder weapon, as the victim had been stabbed nine times. Most of the evidence recovered from the scene was destroyed due to a fire in 2005 at the facility in which they were stored.

== Examination and investigation ==
The victim was believed to have been white, with possible Native American ancestry, and was murdered by sharp force trauma approximately four to seven weeks before her body was discovered. The remains were in an unrecognizable state of decomposition. She was around 5 feet 5 inches (165 cm) to 5 feet 6 inches (168 cm) tall and weighed between 125 and 140 pounds (57 and 64 kg), placing her at an average build. The victim's hair color was determined to have been "blonde, straight and shoulder-length" and her eye color was unknown due to the state of her body.

The victim had orthodontics at one time when alive, and may have removed the brackets from her teeth herself or by someone not affiliated with an orthodontic company. It was later confirmed that Cole had broken the braces from her teeth by herself before her disappearance. Investigators had difficulties with establishing the identity of the victim, as there were no means of identification present at the scene and there were no known witnesses.

Convicted killer Henry Lee Lucas confessed to the killing. This was later proven to be impossible, as Lucas was confirmed to be in Florida when Cole was killed, and has had a since established pattern of false confession. Because of the decomposition of the body, the victim was reconstructed, at first with a three-dimensional clay model, and later with a digital method by the Louisiana State University FACES Lab. Once technologically possible, DNA was eventually extracted from the victim's teeth, which would be used to compare against missing persons.

== Identification and later developments ==
Cole's sister, Jeanie Phelps, filed a missing person's report for Carol, although she suspected foul play, after she was unable to locate her and the report was also entered in the National Missing and Unidentified Persons System, abbreviated as NAMUS. She and Cole's childhood friend had also used Facebook as well as Craigslist to garner awareness and information for the case. The grandmother who was determined to find Cole had since died, but Phelps maintained a strong interest in finding her sister.

Meanwhile, on February 6, 2015, the local sheriff department in Bossier Parish started a Facebook page in effort to identify the young woman, who had come to be known as "Bossier Doe". Within days after the creation of the Facebook profile, over five hundred individuals had "friended" the "Bossier Doe" account. The number increased to well over one thousand after less than a week.

On February 6, a 911 operator named Linda Erickson saw the Facebook page with Bossier Doe's image, then notified detectives when she came across a Craigslist ad with a photo of Carol Ann. It was a Craigslist ad that Patty Thorington, a friend of Carol's sister, had placed in an effort to find any information on the missing girl's whereabouts. By February 13, Thorington said, someone at the Sheriff's Office emailed her regarding their Bossier Doe case.

DNA tests were then conducted after officers turned to Cole's family, using the victim's profile against those of her parents. After tests were completed, it was announced that Cole and "Bossier Doe" were indeed the same person. After this announcement, a GoFundMe account was created for the expenses of a new burial and headstone for the victim, as the family was struggling to pay the means to transport Cole's body and for a headstone. Cole was later buried in the Maple Grove Cemetery in Comstock Township, Michigan on June 18, 2015, after a funeral service.

Since Cole's identification, investigation is now aimed at locating the person responsible for her death. Frances Aucoin, whose father, John Chesson, discovered Cole's remains along with her brother, told officers that she suspects he is responsible. Police confirm that Chesson is considered a person of interest in the case, especially because of his conviction for the murder of his estranged wife's mother, but he has yet to be considered the prime suspect. Aucoin believes that Chesson had decided to go hunting for the first time with his children to establish his innocence by finding the victim's body and reporting it to the police. She went into further detail, describing her father as abusive and that she believes that a young woman he had brought into their home was Cole whom he had picked up as a hitchhiker. Aucoin's brother, a witness in finding the body, committed suicide in 2008. Chesson is currently incarcerated for life for the murder of his estranged wife's mother, which occurred in 1997.

== See also ==
- List of solved missing person cases
- List of unsolved deaths
- Murder of Tammy Alexander, in which the victim remained unidentified for 35 years.
- Murder of Michelle Garvey, in which the victim remained unidentified for 32 years.
- Murder of David Stack, in which the victim remained unidentified for 39 years.
- Murder of Elizabeth Roberts, in which the victim remained unidentified for 43 years.
