= Murder of Peggy Johnson =

Formerly unidentified abuse and murder victim

Peggy Lynn Johnson
- Photograph of Peggy Johnson
- Born: Peggy Lynn Johnson; March 4, 1976; Harvard, Illinois, U.S.
- Status: Identified after 20 years
- Died: c. July 20, 1999 (aged 23); McHenry, Illinois, U.S.
- Cause of death: Homicide by blunt force trauma and sepsis
- Body discovered: July 21, 1999; Raymond, Wisconsin
- Resting place: Holy Family Cemetery, Caledonia, Wisconsin (formerly)
- Other names: Peggy Lynn Schroeder, Racine County Jane Doe,
- Known for: Formerly unidentified victim of homicide
- Height: 5 ft 6 in (1.68 m)
- Website: Facebook page

Peggy Lynn Johnson (formerly known as Racine County Jane Doe), also known by the last name Schroeder, was an American woman whose body was discovered in 1999 in the town of Raymond, Racine County, Wisconsin. She was 23 years old at the time of her death, which had occurred after enduring several weeks of extreme neglect and physical abuse. New developments in the case emerged after her body was exhumed on October 16, 2013, including isotope analysis. In November 2019, authorities announced that after two decades she was finally identified. Both the victim's and the murderer's name were released on November 8, 2019. In March 2022, Linda La Roche was convicted of her murder. In May 2022, she was sentenced to life in prison without the possibility of parole. Johnson's murder received national attention both preceding and following her identification.

== Discovery ==
Johnson's body was discovered in the first rows of a cornfield on July 21, 1999, by a father and daughter walking their dogs along 92nd Street in Raymond, Wisconsin. Her death had occurred within one day before discovery of her body. Johnson's injuries were apparent and her right arm was bent "unnaturally" behind her. Because it rained on the night her body was dumped, little evidence of the perpetrator was found, although she was placed at the scene about 12 hours before precipitation occurred. A witness stated the body was not at the location the day before. Based on marks on her body, she appeared to have been dragged 25 feet from the roadside.

She wore a gray man's shirt with a floral design on the front. The shirt's manufacturer divulged that this type of shirt was first sold in 1984. She was also wearing black sweatpants. No additional clothing was found, including footwear.

== Examination ==
During the autopsy, multiple injuries were observed across her body, and it was determined she endured several weeks of neglect and long-term physical abuse. She was malnourished and suffered from an untreated infection in her left elbow. The abuse increased in severity in the days immediately prior to her death, and she had also been sexually assaulted. Potential chemical burns were identified on 25% of her body and road rash was also observed. Her nose was broken, as were several of her ribs, although some of the latter injuries occurred after death. A "cauliflower ear" deformity may have been caused by the recent increase of abuse she suffered, either from beating or being pulled. Sharp-force trauma was also evident on the same ear.

Additionally, the examination suggested she may have had a cognitive disability. It was believed that she was most likely 18 to 35 years old. Her front incisors protruded from her mouth, and decay was present on many teeth, some of which were missing. Her curly hair was reddish-brown, collar-length, and appeared to have blond highlights. Johnson's eye color was difficult to discern, but listed as brown, green, or hazel. There were two earrings in each of her ears. Additionally, there was evidence she may have worn glasses, despite their absence from the crime scene.

== Investigation ==
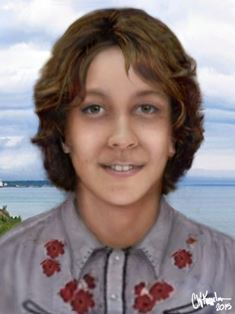
Facial reconstruction of the victim by Carl Koppelman, based upon morgue photographs.

Over 50 people attended Johnson's funeral on October 27, 1999, after the autopsy and other examinations were completed. She was interred at Holy Family Cemetery in Caledonia, Wisconsin. Her gravestone read "Daughter: Jane Doe", along with the dates of discovery and burial, with the phrase "Gone, but not forgotten".

Multiple reconstructions were created of her face to assist with visual identification of the body. In 2012, the National Center for Missing and Exploited Children created a revised reconstruction to replace their original. Another version of this facial composite exists, which depicts a differing facial rendition of how she may have appeared in life.

Police theorized that she was an international visitor, a runaway child or was estranged from her family. In 2011, investigators followed a potential lead that the victim may have been Aundria Bowman (born Alexis Badger), who disappeared from her adoptive parents' house in Hamilton, Michigan, on March 11, 1989. DNA profiling, via Bowman's biological mother Cathy, demonstrated that they were not the same person. Additional missing persons such as Tina D'Ambrosio and Karen Wells were also ruled out.

Some believed that this case could be linked to the murder of Mary Kate Chamizo (née Sunderlin), a previously unidentified victim who was discovered in Lake County, Illinois. Chamizo was also found malnourished, had poor dentition and had been beaten to death. Three were arrested in that case; one was convicted. All three were later cleared due to new evidence.

Her remains were exhumed on October 16, 2013, for further study and transported to Milwaukee, Wisconsin, where her body had previously been examined in 1999. Authorities hoped that by studying the isotopic makeup of her bones, they would be able to tell where she had lived prior to her death. A forensic anthropologist from Tennessee was employed to conduct the tests.

Although the murder remained unsolved at the time, investigators stated they hoped that the case would eventually come to a close. A press conference in 2013 explained they had uncovered more clues.

"All of us [present] here, who have investigated the deaths of individuals during the course of our careers, have seen many troubling things. However, the utter, barbaric brutality inflicted on this young woman is something none of us will never forget."

— Racine County Sheriff Christopher Schmaling, addressing the media to announce the formal identification of Peggy Lynn Johnson and her alleged murderer, Linda La Roche. November 8, 2019.

It was announced on July 19, 2015, that the examination of her remains had been completed and that they would be reburied on the 16th anniversary of Johnson's discovery. Authorities stated they had indeed uncovered new leads from the exhumation, but they declined to state any details.

On October 20, 2016, it was announced that chemical isotope testing performed by the Smithsonian on a sample of her hair and bone suggested she was potentially from or spent several years of her life in Alaska, Montana or portions of southern Canada. Authorities did not comment on what testing the results were from, whether recent with hair or history from bone. The police department planned on seeking forensic genetic genealogy organizations to identify potential relatives of the victim.

== Identification and arrest of Linda La Roche ==
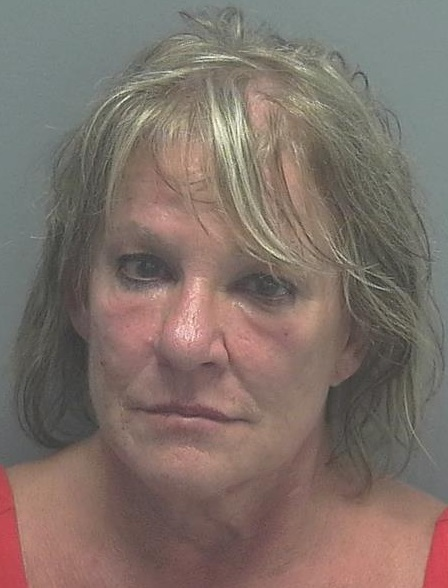
Mugshot of Linda La Roche, taken in Lee County, Florida, after her arrest.

On November 7, 2019, the Racine County Sheriff's Office announced that Sheriff Christopher Schmaling would hold a media briefing the following day to release information about Jane Doe's identity and the name of the individual in custody for her death. The announcement stated that "both the victim and the individual in custody have substantial ties to a northwestern Chicago suburb."

On November 8, 2019, Racine County authorities identified the victim through DNA comparison as Peggy Lynn Johnson, 23, of McHenry, Illinois. Her accused killer was identified as a 63-year-old nurse, Linda Sue La Roche. La Roche owned her own nursing practice, established in 1997, which provided health care to at least two Illinois correctional facilities, without displaying any questionable or inadequate behavior. Johnson was never reported missing to police, although an aunt placed a personal ad in a December 1999 issue of the Northwest Herald requesting Johnson contact her.

La Roche was arrested on November 5, 2019, in Cape Coral, Florida, where she resided since 2013. The warrant was listed as $1 million. She reportedly confessed to killing someone during her time in Illinois to various individuals, one of whom alerted police on September 23, 2019. According to a criminal complaint, La Roche was charged with first-degree intentional homicide and concealment of a corpse. Authorities state the maximum penalty would be life in prison. At the time she was charged with murdering Peggy Johnson, she was facing legal proceedings after causing a vehicle accident while intoxicated.

Johnson was reportedly last seen by classmates at a 1994 homecoming dance in Harvard, Illinois. The victim and her accused killer first encountered each other in 1994 at a medical clinic where La Roche worked. She became homeless at age 18 after her mother's death; her brother and father had previously died. Johnson agreed to serve as a housekeeper for La Roche in exchange for room and board. The emotional and physical abuse against Johnson took place over a significant period of time before her death, presumably since moving into the residence. As indicated by the autopsy, she was subjected to a poor living environment and was not well-nourished. Instances of La Roche's abuse toward Johnson were confirmed by her children, one of which the victim confided in after being asked about a bruise to the face.

La Roche claimed Johnson repeatedly stole from the residence, including medication, and invited men over without permission. La Roche's now-ex-husband stated he came home in July 1999 to find Johnson lying unresponsive, which La Roche claimed resulted from an overdose. La Roche admitted to storing medication in the cellar of their residence, where Johnson was allegedly forced to sleep, and that she witnessed seeing Johnson "faint" after emptying pill containers in their bathroom sink. Johnson allegedly died after being taken outside for better air quality. La Roche instructed her then-husband to take their children away for an outing so she could dispose of the body. Paramedics were not called and La Roche did not provide medical assistance to the victim, despite her occupation as a nurse. The autopsy of Johnson's body disputed the alleged overdose, as toxicology tests proved negative. La Roche informed her husband upon his return that the victim regained consciousness, after which she gave two different accounts of leaving Johnson with her grandmother or abandoning her, unharmed, along a roadway in Wisconsin. Johnson's grandmother denied ever meeting members of the La Roche family, let alone seeing Johnson on the day in question.

Police explained they planned to exhume Johnson's body once again, and re-inter her next to her mother in Belvidere, Illinois.

== Legal proceedings ==
La Roche first appeared in court on January 9, 2020, for a preliminary hearing which was adjourned due to the fact that La Roche did not have an attorney. Her trial was initially set for February 2020, but was postponed until April 2021 due to lack of attorney, and then indefinitely due to the COVID-19 pandemic.

The trial commenced in March 2022. On March 16, 2022, La Roche was found guilty of first-degree intentional homicide of Johnson and hiding her corpse. She was sentenced to life imprisonment without the possibility of parole.

== See also ==
- List of homicides in Illinois
- Murder of Erika Hill, a case similar to Johnson's.
- List of solved missing person cases
