= Murder of Erika Hill =

Murder of 15-year-old American girl

Erika Hill
- Facial reconstruction composite of Erika Hill
- Born: Erika Antoinette Hill c. 1992
- Status: Unidentified for 8 years
- Died: February 2007 (aged 15); Fitchburg, Wisconsin, U.S.
- Cause of death: Homicide by asphyxiation
- Body discovered: February 26, 2007; Gary, Indiana, U.S.
- Other names: Jane Gary Doe, Lake County Jane Doe

Erika Antoinette Hill was a 15-year-old American girl who was murdered in Fitchburg, Wisconsin, in February 2007. Her body was found in Gary, Indiana on February 26, and her identity was not discovered until 2015. Taylin Hill, her adoptive mother, was charged with reckless homicide after Hill's identification, and later pleaded guilty to reduced charges for which she was sentenced to 20 years' imprisonment.

== Background ==
Erika Hill was born in 1992 and lived with her adoptive mother, Taylin Hill (also known as "Minnie" and "Marie") in Fitchburg, Wisconsin. Taylin Hill was cousin to Erika's biological mother, Theresa Spiva. Theresa had a history of substance abuse and was compelled to relinquish custody of her daughter. Theresa Spiva died in 2009.

Erika endured abuse from her adoptive mother, who had also abused the other children in her care, nearly on a daily basis over a period of years. Investigations of Taylin Hill's abuse allegations had previously been conducted in the years between 2000 and 2005, the last halting after authorities were unable to contact Taylin.

== Death ==
After enduring long term abuse and starvation, Erika died in February 2007. Taylin reportedly called her sister and daughter at their jobs and asked them to come to the home, where she showed them Erika's body in the bathroom. The next day, Taylin coerced them and other members of the household into taking the body to the basement and placing it in a freezer. Erika had been beaten and asphyxiated with a cloth that was later found over her mouth. Erika had also been stabbed and beaten. Some of her teeth were broken in an effort to hinder identification. Taylin also redressed the body in "cheap" clothing. The Hill family later drove the body to Chicago to dispose of it, where Taylin burned the body underneath an overpass and the family drove home, only to return and relocate the body due to Taylin's fear of an "elderly person having a heart attack" upon finding the remains and subsequently drove the body to Gary, Indiana. Many of the children in her care feared speaking out due to threatened retaliation and one denied Taylin's alleged abuse.

When others would inquire the whereabouts of Erika after she disappeared, Taylin reportedly claimed she had returned to her hometown of Joliet, Illinois, where she had previously been cared for by her great-aunt, who died in 2001.

== Discovery ==
On February 26, 2007, two brothers reported to police that they saw what appeared to be charred legs in the entrance of a vacant building in Gary. The victim had likely died one day before. The body had been set on fire after death had occurred and it appeared she had not been burned at the location she was found.

The body was of petite stature, 5 ft 4 in (1.63 m) to 5 ft 6 in (1.68 m) tall, and weighing 102 pounds (46 kg). She was erroneously estimated to be between sixteen and twenty-five and the date of her death was inaccurately placed at twenty-four hours earlier. Over 170 distinct scars were found on the face and on several other parts of the body; these may have been inflicted at different times, as they were in different stages of healing. The hair had been pulled back into cornrows. Due to the condition of the body, the color of the eyes and clothing (except for pink underwear) could not be determined.

Due to the condition of the body, visual identification was impossible. The National Center for Missing & Exploited Children created three renderings of the victim depicted in life, one around the time she was discovered and the next two, a frontal and profile image in 2014.

== Identification and trial ==
Erika's remains were identified in 2015. This occurred after Taylin Hill's daughter contacted police in Gary, Indiana claiming that she knew the identity of the unidentified victim on August 7, 2015, after she searched the internet for unidentified bodies that matched Erika's description. She recognized the reconstruction of the victim created by the National Center for Missing & Exploited Children to be the closest match. She had decided to contact authorities after a therapy session and claimed she wanted to end the "pattern of abuse."

Taylin was arrested on September 14, 2015, and charged with first-degree reckless homicide, in addition to six additional charges of child abuse. Taylin Hill was reportedly on suicide watch while being held for the trial. Her bond was set at $500,000. A preliminary hearing took place on September 22.

Taylin Hill had previously worked in schools as a special education aide between 1998 and 2004. She lost her position in 2006 after she did not return from a leave of absence. She returned as a substitute aide in 2013 and remained employed until she was charged with Erika's death, when the school district placed her on leave. Many members of the community were surprised after the charges were brought forward, as she was often known to be kind and never abused the children in her care in front of others. Taylin Hill's family, however, claimed they had always known "something was wrong" with Hill's character.

In July 2016, Taylin Hill pleaded guilty to three reduced charges, including child neglect and abuse. On November 7, 2016, she was sentenced to 20 years in prison for causing Erika's death.

== See also ==
- List of homicides in Wisconsin
- Murder of Peggy Johnson – a similar murder to that of Erika Hill
- List of murdered American children
- List of solved missing person cases (post-2000)
