= Zhang Yang =

Zhang Yang may refer to:

- Zhang Yang (warlord) (died 198), Chinese warlord of the late Han Dynasty
- Chang Yang (pinyin: Zhang Yang, born 1930), Hong Kong actor
- Zhang Yang (director) (born 1967), Chinese film director
- Zhang Yang (general) (1951–2017), Chinese general in the People's Liberation Army
- Zhang Yang (ice hockey), Chinese ice hockey player, member of China Sharks ice hockey team
- Zhang Yang (badminton), Chinese badminton player
