= Murder of Aundria Bowman =

Murder of an American teenager from Hamilton, Michigan

Aundria Bowman
- Born: Alexis Miranda Badger; June 23, 1974; New Orleans, Louisiana, U.S.
- Disappeared: March 11, 1989 (aged 14); Hamilton, Michigan, U.S.
- Body discovered: February 4, 2020; Allegan County, Michigan, U.S.

Aundria Michelle Bowman (born Alexis Miranda Badger) (b. June 23, 1974 – disappeared March 11, 1989) was an American teenager who vanished under mysterious circumstances from her adoptive family's property in Hamilton, Michigan. She was adopted as an infant by Dennis and Brenda Bowman. At 14, she vanished from her family’s rural property, a short time after accusing Dennis Bowman of molesting her.

Aundria Bowman remained a missing person for more than 30 years, and she was classified as a runaway. In November 2019, Dennis Bowman was arrested for the September 1980 murder of Kathleen Doyle in Norfolk, Virginia. He was extradited to Virginia in February 2020 to face charges in Doyle's murder, and in May 2020, was charged with Aundria Bowman's murder.

Aundria Bowman's case has received national media attention, including coverage by Inside Edition and Oxygen. Into the Fire: The Lost Daughter is a two-part Netflix original documentary about her case released on September 12, 2024.

== Background ==
Aundria Bowman was born Alexis Miranda Badger on June 23, 1974, in New Orleans, Louisiana. She was placed for adoption by her then-17-year-old biological mother, Cathy Terkanian, at 9 months old. She was adopted by Dennis and Brenda Bowman, of Hamilton, Michigan.

== Disappearance ==
In late 1988, Bowman raised concerns with staff at her high school when she expressed fearfulness of going home from school. Staff at the school involved police, who interviewed Bowman, during which she claimed that her adoptive father was molesting her. A social worker returned Bowman to her family's residence, and confronted them about Bowman's allegations. Dennis and his wife both denied the allegations, claiming that Bowman's rebelliousness had been sparked by her family's recent disclosure that she had been adopted as an infant.

Shortly after this incident, the Bowmans relocated to a mobile home in a rural area of Allegan County, and she disappeared from there. When her family reported her missing, Dennis Bowman claimed she had stolen money from him before running away. Bowman's case was classified as an "endangered runaway".

== Investigation ==
Dennis Bowman's criminal record at the time of Aundria's disappearance was notable: In 1980, he was arrested after a young woman claimed he attempted to lure her into a wooded area in western Michigan and assault her. He pleaded guilty to the assault after working out a deal with prosecutors.

In 1993, Bowman's photograph was shown in the music video for the Soul Asylum song "Runaway Train" (1993), among other missing children.

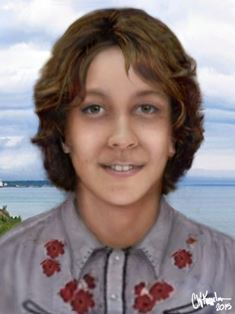
Facial reconstruction by Carl Koppelman of Racine County Jane Doe, initially thought to be Aundria Bowman, but later proven via DNA profiling to be Peggy Johnson

In 1998, Dennis Bowman was arrested for breaking and entering the home of a coworker in Ottawa County to steal items, including woman's lingerie. Before his sentencing in the case, Dennis Bowman referenced his missing daughter in a letter to the presiding judge: "I am the father of two lovely daughters, one 25 and the other 11, and feel that being a parent is one of the most important and sobering things a person can undertake."

A Jane Doe discovered in a Wisconsin corn field in 1999 was believed to possibly be Aundria Bowman due to similarities in facial structure. However, Bowman was ruled out as a possibility through DNA profiling provided by her biological mother, Cathy, and this 1999 case was later determined as that of Peggy Johnson.

== Later developments ==
=== Arrest of Dennis Bowman ===
Aundria's adoptive father, Dennis Bowman, was arrested in November 2019 for the unsolved homicide of 25-year-old Kathleen Doyle in Norfolk, Virginia, which occurred on September 11, 1980. During this time, Bowman had been in the midst of the court proceedings for his attempted assault of a young woman, though he was unable to attend court hearings for a two-week period in September 1980, claiming he was a member of the United States Navy Reserve and was required to attend a two-week drill.

=== Confession and recovery of remains ===
In early February 2020, it was reported that Dennis Bowman, incarcerated while pending trial for the murder of Kathleen Doyle, confessed to police that he had murdered his adopted daughter, Aundria. Several days later, it was announced that skeletal remains had been recovered from the 3200 block of 136th Avenue of Monterey Township (near Bowman's home) in Allegan County, concealed by a thin layer of cement. On February 9, 2020, Dennis Bowman was extradited to Virginia to face charges in Doyle's murder.

It was subsequently confirmed via DNA that the remains were in fact Aundria Bowman. On May 15, 2020, Dennis Bowman was charged with the murder of Aundria. Police stated that he confessed to striking Aundria, causing her to die of a resulting head injury, and then dismembered her body with an axe and machete.

Bowman pleaded guilty to both charges in June. He was sentenced to two life sentences for killing Doyle. On December 22, 2021, Bowman pleaded no contest to second-degree murder in the death of 14-year-old Aundria in Allegan County Circuit Court. He was sentenced to an additional 35–50 years in prison for Aundria Bowman's murder.

Dennis Lee Bowman is currently imprisoned in the Buckingham Correctional Center.

== In the media ==
Aundria Bowman's case has received national media attention, including coverage by Inside Edition and Oxygen.

=== TV series ===
A two-part miniseries about solving the murder directed by Ryan White, titled Into the Fire: The Lost Daughter, was released on Netflix on September 12, 2024.

== See also ==
- List of homicides in Michigan
- Lists of solved missing person cases
