= Les Mahoney =

American actor and filmmaker

Les Mahoney is an American actor and independent filmmaker known for such films as Mike Case in: The Big Kiss Off, Coldwood and At Granny's House.

His film Mike Case in: The Big Kiss Off won four awards at the 2013 Hollywood & Vine Film Festival, including best director (Justin Baird), Best Score (Edward "Tex" Miller), Best Actor (Mahoney) and the top prize, the Grand Jury Prize.

Mahoney has appeared in over 40 films and over 30 TV series. Mahoney has appeared in such movies as Killer Priest, Brando: Unauthorized, Dirty South and Tangerine Sky, and TV series including Dead of Night, Unusual Suspects and 1000 Ways to Die.

Mahoney is president of the film production company Vagabond Entertainment.

== Personal life ==
He is married to fellow producer Tammy Ridenour, and has two children, Brendan and Jillian, and two granddaughters, Adelita and Fair.
