= Carl Koppelman =

American forensic sketch artist

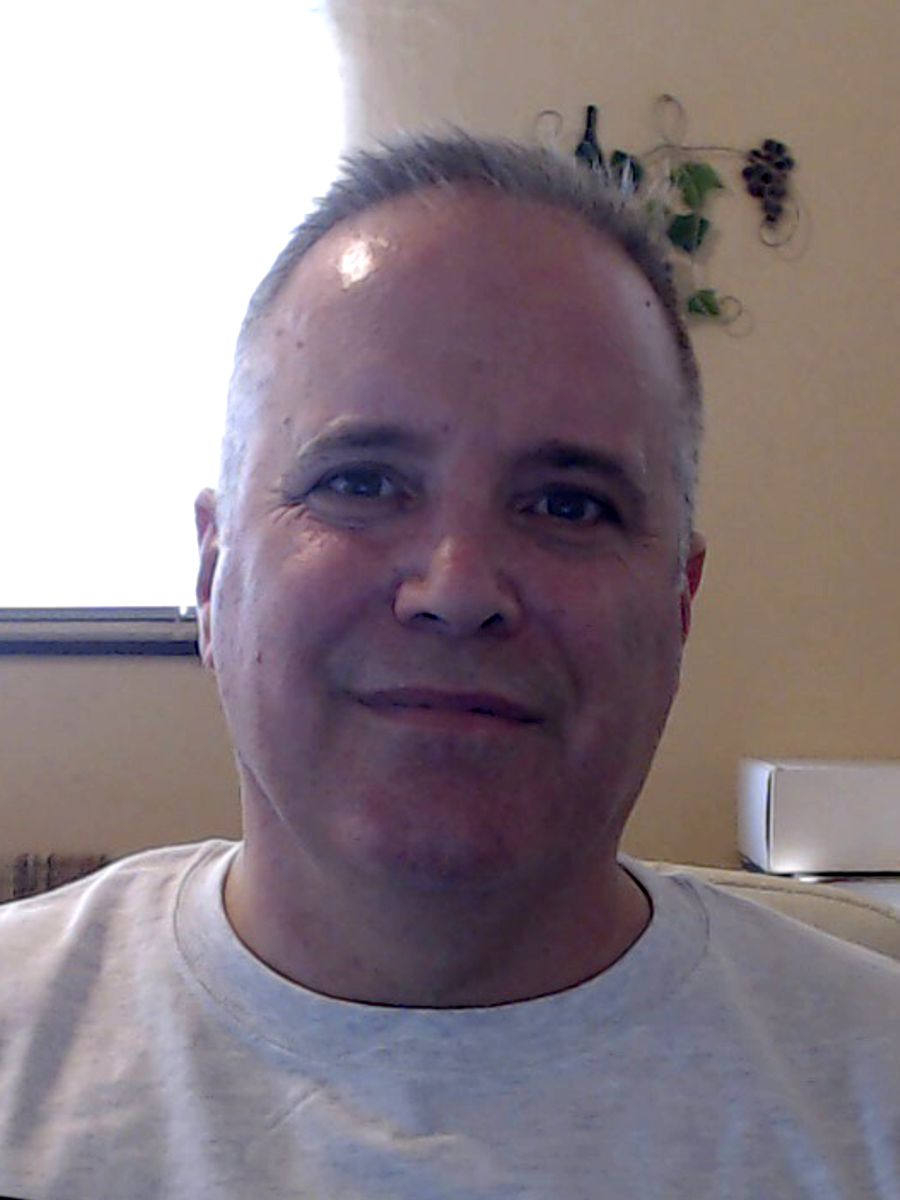
- Koppelman in 2022
- Born: Carl William Koppelman; December 1962 (age 63); Los Angeles, California, U.S.
- Occupations: Accountant, forensic sketch artist
- Years active: 2009–present
- Known for: Forensic facial reconstructions of missing and unidentified people

Carl Koppelman (born December 1962) is an American professional accountant and unpaid volunteer forensic sketch artist. Since 2009, Koppelman has drawn over 250 reconstructions and age progressions of missing and unidentified people.

== Early life ==
Koppelman has attributed his fascination with crime and unsolved mysteries to growing up in the 1970s, when there was increased coverage of serial killers. Koppelman has also credited several key incidents as formative experiences and additional reasons for his interest. The first of these happened when he was 9, during the 1972 Summer Olympics, when terrorists killed 11 Israeli athletes. Koppelman has cited this as being one of the earlier memories of the evil that people do to each other. The next key event happened in 1977, when Koppelman was 14. A friend of Koppelman's brother, 17-year-old John LaMay, was killed by the "trash bag killer" Patrick Kearney. This incident directly impacted Koppelman's sphere of community. The third notable incident did not directly impact Koppelman, but was a formative experience for him nonetheless. In 1979, when Koppelman was 16, 16-year-old Lucinda Lynn Schaefer was killed by the "tool box killers" in neighboring Redondo Beach, California. Koppelman remembers following news of the case in the newspaper.

During his young adulthood, Koppelman worked multiple odd jobs. These jobs included construction work, working in the meat room at a grocery store, and a metalworking job in the aerospace industry. Koppelman never worked in a profession that required artistry, but he had done art recreationally for most of his life. Koppelman, who did not enjoy any of the jobs he held, went to Long Beach State University to study accounting. After college, Koppelman worked as an internal auditor for the Los Angeles County Municipal Court, and a Senior Accountant for Princess Cruises, based in Santa Clarita, California. Following that, Koppelman worked as a Senior Financial Analyst for The Walt Disney Company in Burbank, California until 2009, when his aging mother's failing health prevented him from making the commute. Koppelman subsequently became his mother's full-time caretaker at her house in El Segundo, California. At the time, his mother was 86. Because of how much care his mother needed, most of Koppelman's interaction with the rest of the world took place online during this time. In 2017, after his mother's death, Koppelman sold her house and returned to work.

== Forensic involvement ==
=== Initial interest ===
Koppelman first became truly interested in crime and forensics in August 2009, after the media storm surrounding the safe return of Jaycee Dugard. Koppelman reports sitting in his mother's home on the computer, looking at online news articles about the case and photos of Dugard. Through his seeking of material about the case, Koppelman first came across Websleuths, a forum website for armchair enthusiasts of crime investigation. Koppelman began to explore the website, and found himself gravitating specifically towards the forum for the missing and unidentified. Over time, Koppelman shifted from reading the discussions to pitching in on them, spending up to 12 hours a day searching for leads, from sources such as old yearbooks and Classmates.com pages. Koppelman posts under the username CarlK90245. Koppelman has stated that the skills he learned as an accountant helped him in his pursuits as a web sleuth, including the large spreadsheet he keeps of listings from NamUs. Koppelman continued to contribute, eventually being appointed as an unpaid administrator for the forum.

=== Work as a sketch artist ===
Koppelman's work as an amateur sketch artist began in 2009, when he noted that police reconstructions of unidentified and formerly unidentified decedents often did not resemble their subjects, as well as looking stiff and not lively. Koppelman's first reconstruction was of a male found dead of accidental causes in a motel in Philadelphia in 2006, later identified as Joseph Cole. After this, Koppelman continued to create reconstructions. Initially, Koppelman would do reconstructions based on which cases had postmortem photos publicly available online, though as he grew in rapport Koppelman began to work with law enforcement on cases. Nancy Monahan's website for missing and unidentified people in Pennsylvania asked to use one of Koppelman's reconstructions, this one being of an unidentified male who died in a hospital in Los Angeles after a coma caused by blunt trauma to the head, who was later identified as George Pollard of Harrisburg, Pennsylvania. Koppelman's reconstruction was directly attributed to helping match the identification, as loved ones of Pollard saw the reconstruction on Monahan's website and noted the similarities between the reconstruction and George Pollard. Pollard's case is often attributed to be Koppelman's first significant contribution as a forensic artist.

Since he began his forensic involvement, Koppelman has helped to close 8 cases as of 2019. Koppelman has no specific criteria for how he picks which cases he will reconstruct. Koppelman's renderings themselves have been credited in the identifications of 3 unidentified decedents. Koppelman himself has matched 5 identities, and his contributions have helped 2 missing-presumed-dead be recovered alive. Koppelman, who is almost always an unpaid volunteer, puts every reconstruction up on Websleuths. Koppelman also sends his completed reconstructions to NamUs, who then decide whether or not to display it on the case's listing. Koppelman also works by request with local law enforcements, and is a volunteer at the DNA Doe Project, where he helps to do genealogical research in addition to providing reconstructions. In addition to reconstructions of unidentified decedents, Koppelman also gets requests from families of missing persons to create age progressions of their missing loved ones. Koppelman receives a high volume of such requests, and is not logistically capable of fulfilling all of them. Koppelman's Websleuths involvements in multiple cases have been reported in the press, most famously those of Tammy Alexander and Sherri Jarvis. One of the owners of Websleuths, Tricia Griffith, has personally thanked Koppelman for his contributions.

Following the death of his mother in 2017, Koppelman returned to working as an accountant, but continues to create forensic reconstructions.

=== Forensic arts process ===
According to Koppelman, each reconstruction takes multiple drafts, with some reconstructions taking dozens. Koppelman creates his reconstructions on Corel Photo-Paint, software he received as a gift. Koppelman begins each reconstruction with a model photo of a live person who is similar to how the decedent would have looked in life, which he uses to maintain a lifelike quality to his reconstructions. After several years of experience creating forensic reconstructions, Koppelman is adept at figuring out the race, sex, age, and build of a decedent based on highly degraded remains, including charred remains or skulls. Koppelman sets the model photo at 90% transparency, with the intention to keep his reconstruction from being unduly influenced by the model photo, which is intended to serve more as a guideline. Koppelman then creates the reconstruction while studying post-mortem photographs of the decedent extensively. The amount of time each reconstruction takes to complete varies based on factors such as decomposition and facial trauma. Cases with minimal damage typically take between 5 and 6 hours for Koppelman to reconstruct. However, even in cases with minimal decomposition, rigor mortis causes changes in facial features such as the eyes and mouth.

== Notable cases ==
Carl Koppelman's involvement has been credited with significant progress in multiple cases, and in some cases, such as that of Tammy Jo Alexander, Koppelman was even the one to link the decedent with their correct identity. In the case of Sherri Ann Jarvis, Koppelman was the administrator of a Facebook page that helped to keep public attention on the case. In the cases of Aundria Bowman and Linda Pagano, Koppelman's involvement on the cases can increase the pressure on law enforcement to make headway in the cases.

=== "Cali Doe" Tammy Jo Alexander ===
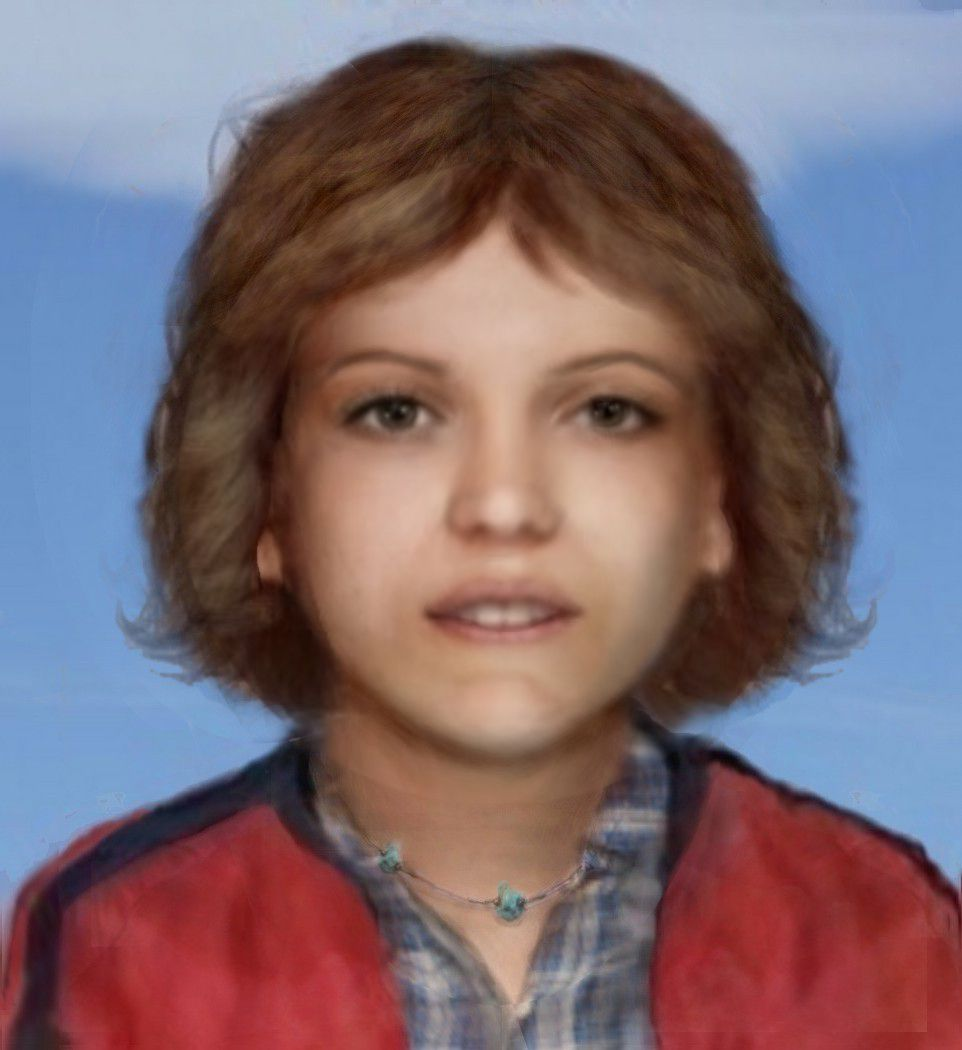
Reconstruction by Koppelman of Tammy Alexander

In 1979, a teenaged girl was shot in the back and head and dumped in a cornfield in Caledonia, in upstate New York. The girl, who inspectors believed was a runaway or hitchhiker, remained unidentified, coming to be known instead as "Caledonia Jane Doe" or "Cali Doe". Koppelman made his first reconstruction of Cali Doe in 2010, but would reconstruct her more than 20 more times in the coming years. Koppelman reported being specially invested in the Cali Doe case, and had said that he believed that after so much time spent reconstructing Cali Doe, he would be able to recognize her anywhere. In addition to repeatedly reconstructing the victim's face, Koppelman also would spend hours looking through old yearbooks from high schools in Florida, Arizona, and Southern California, places where pollen analysis of the victim's clothing indicated she had been living shortly before her death. Due to her history of running away, Tammy Jo Alexander was assumed to have started a new life elsewhere without contact with her family. In autumn of 2014, a friend of Alexander's from high school, wondering what had happened to her old classmate, put up a missing person listing including a photo of Alexander. Before that, Alexander had not been listed as missing anywhere. In September of that year, Koppelman came upon the listing for Alexander on NamUs and immediately suspected that Alexander could be Cali Doe. The identification was confirmed through forensic DNA analysis using DNA from Alexander's half-sister, Pamela Dyson. On January 25, 2016, 35 years after her death, Cali Doe was publicly identified as Tammy Jo Alexander of Florida. A funeral service for Alexander was held at the cemetery she was buried at in Livingston, New York, which Koppelman was in attendance for.

=== "Walker County Jane Doe" Sherri Ann Jarvis ===
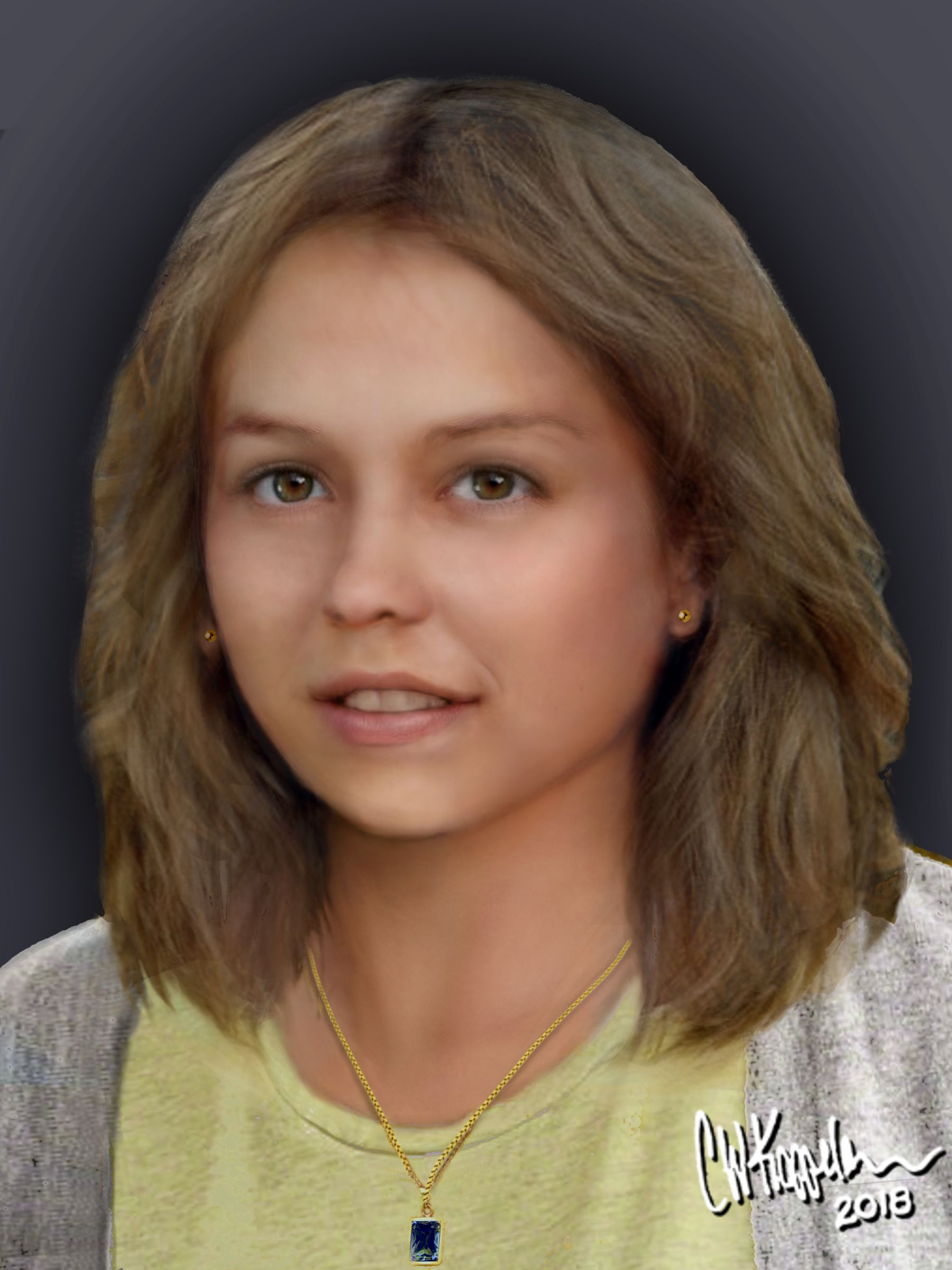
Reconstruction by Koppelman of Sherri Jarvis

On 1 November 1980, a passing truck driver on Interstate 45 in Huntsville discovered the nude body of a young teenaged girl beside the road in Walker County, Texas. The girl had been sexually assaulted before being strangled. Witnesses report having last seen the girl hitchhiking at the nearby Hitchin' Post truck stop, and she had told a waitress there that she was from Rockport or Aransas Pass, Texas. Koppelman worked on the Walker County Jane Doe case for 12 years, having first learned about the case in 2009, but it was not until after the positive identification of Tammy Jo Alexander that Koppelman became heavily focused on Walker County Jane Doe. Koppelman says that after the identification of Tammy Alexander, his focus on Walker County Jane Doe became singleminded. In addition to making multiple reconstructions of Walker County Jane Doe, Koppelman spent a significant amount of hours combing forensic files and police reports on the case, as well as searching old yearbooks from high schools in Texas. Koppelman also started and maintained a Facebook page dedicated to the case, called "Who Was Walker County Jane Doe". Koppelman stated that the case captivated him because "It's a teenage girl who appears to have been from a middle-class background. You'd think the parents would come claim the body or report her missing. But that never happened. That in and of itself was a big mystery." Koppelman has reported that the Walker County Jane Doe case is the one he spent the most time on. In 2017, Koppelman even traveled to Huntsville to retrace her last steps. In 2021, Walker County Jane Doe was positively identified as Sherri Ann Jarvis, 14, of Stillwater, Minnesota.

=== Aundria Bowman ===
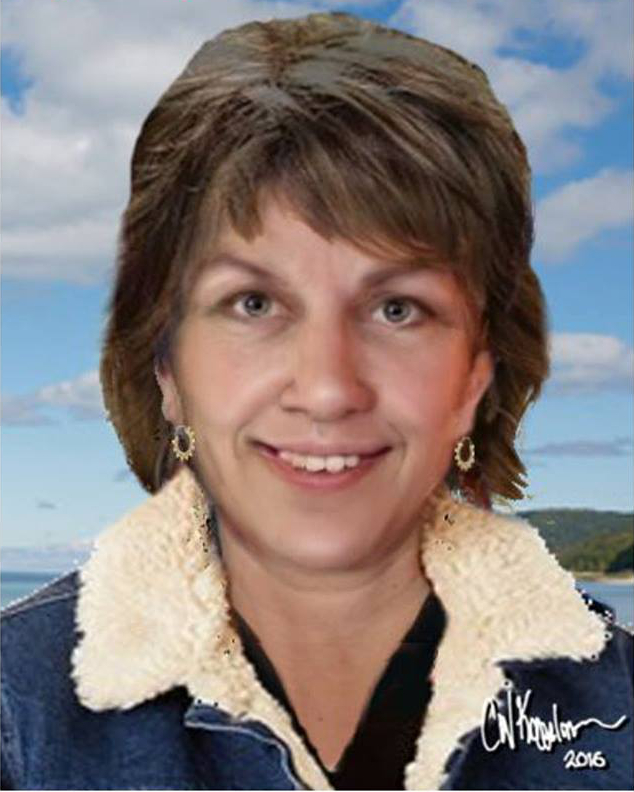
Age progression by Koppelman of Aundria Bowman

On 11 March 1989, 14-year-old Aundria Bowman, born Alexis Miranda Badger, disappeared from her adoptive family's home in Holland, Michigan, after accusing her adoptive father Dennis Bowman of molesting her. She was reported as missing by Dennis Bowman, who claimed she had run away. In 2009, Koppelman became aware of the case of Racine County Jane Doe, later identified as Peggy Lynn Johnson. Koppelman began to research the case, including looking through news articles and dedicated social media pages, as well as missing persons database. While looking through missing person listings on NamUs, Koppelman identified Aundria Bowman as a strong candidate for being Racine County Jane Doe. The theory was that Aundria had run away and been murdered years later, in 1999. Koppelman began to investigate Aundria's disappearance online, eventually coming across a Classmates.com page for Aundria that was still actively being maintained. Koppelman reached out to the owner of the page, who revealed herself to be Aundria's biological mother, Cathy Terkanian. Terkanian first heard of her daughter's disappearance in 2010, when she was asked to provide a DNA sample to compare to the Racine County Jane Doe (later identified as Peggy Johnson). Koppelman and Terkanian exchanged lengthy correspondence, forming a friendship as they investigated Aundria's disappearance, even after DNA from Terkanian ruled out Aundria as Racine County Jane Doe. Dennis Bowman, Aundria's adoptive father, emerged as the most viable suspect in her disappearance. Dennis Bowman had a preexisting criminal history, including sexual assault, at the time of Aundria's disappearance. Koppelman and Terkanian made four trips to Michigan to interview friends of Aundria and pressure law enforcement into investigating. When Dennis Bowman came into the police station to report Terkanian for harassment, police collected his DNA, and linked it to a murder committed in 1980. When Dennis Bowman was convicted of the murder of Kathleen Doyle, he confessed to the murder of his adoptive daughter. Aundria's body was recovered in February 2020 from beneath a concrete slab in Dennis Bowman's backyard. In 2021, Dennis Bowman was convicted of Aundria's murder.

=== "Strongsville Jane Doe" Linda Pagano ===
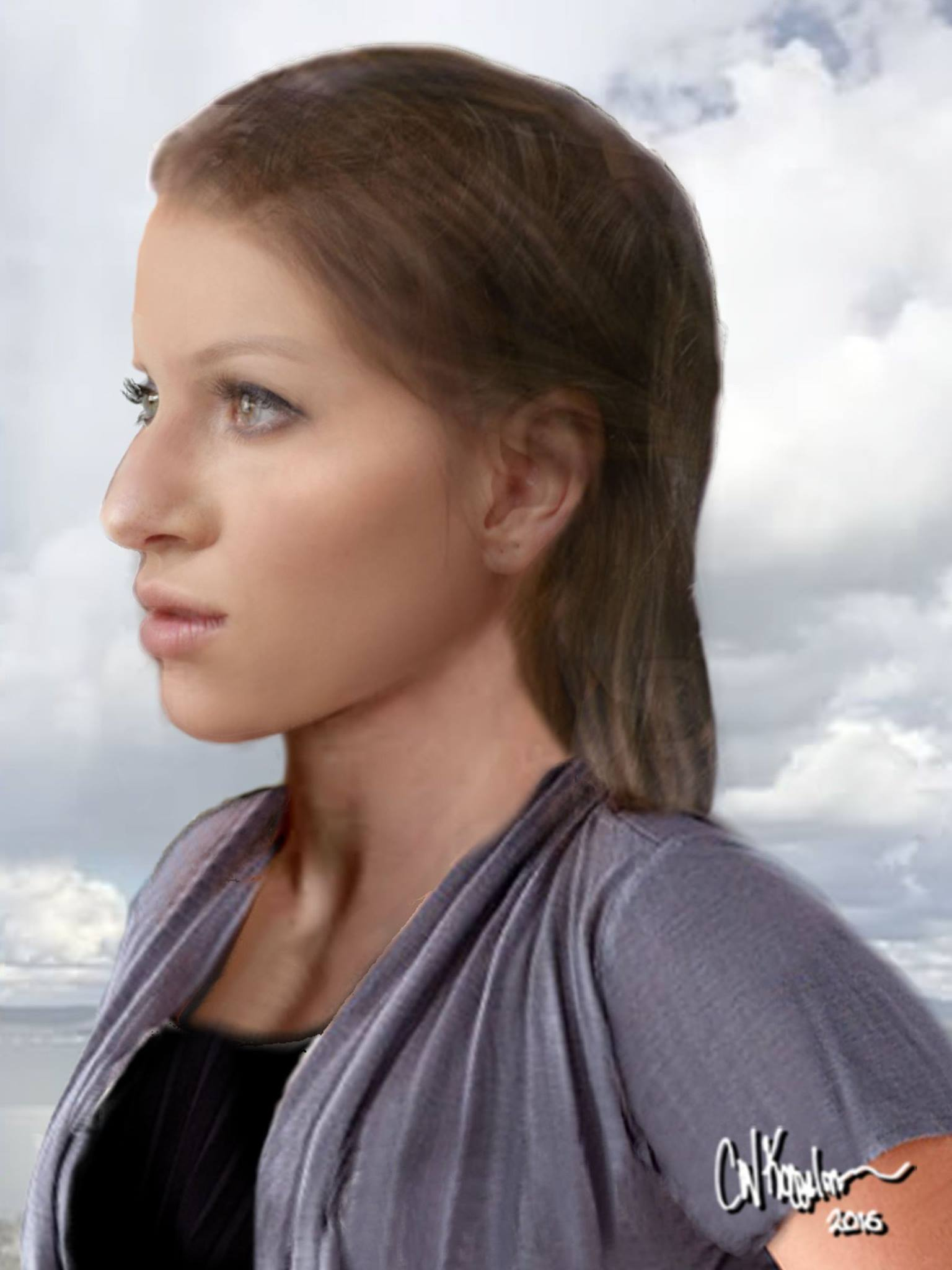
Reconstruction by Koppelman of Linda Pagano

In September 1974, 17-year-old Linda Pagano was kicked out of her stepfather's house in Akron, Ohio following an argument. Pagano was never seen alive again. In February 1975 a partial skeleton was discovered on a river bank in a park in Strongsville, Ohio. The skeleton was determined to be a young white female who had been killed by a gunshot to the head. When the skeleton continued to remain unidentified, she was buried in an anonymous grave. In 2014, Christina Scates, a local college student, was doing genealogy research in cemetery records when she rediscovered the unidentified burial. Scates posted her find on Reddit, expressing shock that there seemed to be little investigation done into the girl's identity. In 2015, her posting attracted the attention of Carl Koppelman. Koppelman posted a reconstruction of Strongsville Jane Doe's skull, but it did not lead to an identification. Shortly after seeing Scates' post, Koppelman was contacted by the Cuyahoga County Medical Examiner's Office to work on an unrelated case. Koppelman asked for higher quality photos of the unidentified skeleton, and it was realized that a clerical error had prevented the case from being listed in NamUs. Within a year of Koppelman inquiring about the case, Akron law enforcement reached out to Cuyahoga County with the theory that Strongsville Jane Doe could be Linda Pagano. On 12 July 2018, Strongsville Jane Doe was publicly identified as Linda Pagano.
