= Websleuths =

Internet community that is focused on crime and missing people

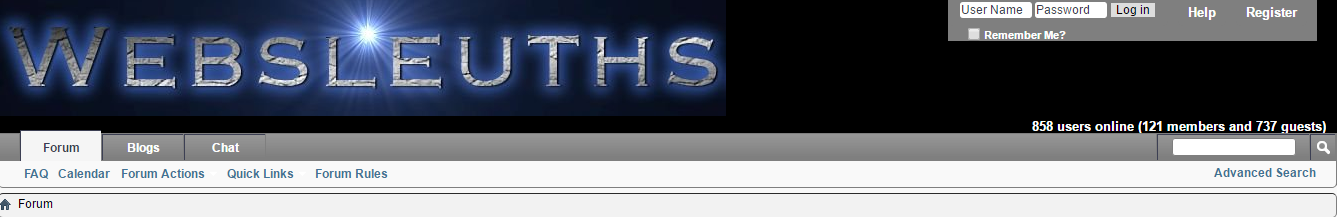
- Website type: crime-sleuthing community
- Owner: Websleuths LLC
- Website: www.websleuths.com
- Commercial: Yes
- Users: 243,518 as of Oct 2025
- Launched: 25 May 1999; 27 years ago
- Current status: active

Websleuths is an internet community that is focused on crime and missing persons. The privately owned Websleuths LLC maintains a forum for registered users to discuss and classify information related to crimes, trials and unsolved cases, which they try to solve. Tricia Griffith purchased the site in 2004.

Some content is available for viewing without registration. Members have an option to be verified with their credentials by the administrator if they have specific expertise, such as DNA analysis professionals, law enforcement, or are related to a specific crime in some way.

== Notable cases ==
Crimes which have received national attention are always highlighted by Websleuths. The 2008 Caylee Anthony murder and 2011 trial of her mother drew years of interest and commentary regarding the murder, media attention to the case, and documentation of evidence and information. The television show Law & Order portrayed Websleuths in an episode about the Anthony case named "Crimebusters".

In 2014, Carl Koppelman, a California man who is a member of Websleuths, believed that he had identified a match between a new image of Tammy Alexander, long missing from Hernando County, Florida, and a forensic portrait of a young unidentified homicide victim known as Caledonia Jane Doe, found in Livingston County, New York in 1979. He notified both Sheriff's offices and the NamUs database administrators. With this lead, police were able to make a DNA match between the victim and her half-sister, confirming her in January 2015 as Alexander more than 35 years after her death.

A Vice.com profile highlights a case where; "In 2006, the site's efforts helped solve the murder of a homeless man who’d won the lottery."

== Alliances and other activities ==
Tricia Griffith hosts a weekly podcast on Blog Talk Radio. In 2016, Websleuths joined the producers of the television show The Killing Season in an interactive look at the unsolved Long Island serial killer cases. Griffith frequently hosts live Websleuths videos discussing current cases on YouTube.

== See also ==
- List of Internet forums
