= National Missing and Unidentified Persons System =

System of databases in the US

The National Missing and Unidentified Persons System (NamUs) is a national clearinghouse and resource center for missing, unidentified, and unclaimed person cases throughout the United States.

NamUs is funded and administered by the National Institute of Justice through a cooperative agreement with the University of North Texas Health Science Center's Center for Human Identification.

NamUs resources are provided to law enforcement, medical examiners, coroners, allied forensic professionals, and family members of missing persons. They include technology, forensic and analytical services, investigative support, and local, regional, and online training programs.

New York, Connecticut, Tennessee, New Jersey and Oklahoma have passed legislation to require agencies to add missing persons to NamUs listings.

== Services ==
- Database technology which provides a secure, easy-to-use, centralized online database for information sharing, case management, advanced searching, and automatic matching tools to expedite case associations and resolutions.
- Regional Program Specialists (RPSs) who hold Department of Justice security clearances, vet all professional users and case data, assist with the collection of biometric information, provide NamUs training, assist with the coordination and implementation of missing person day events, and provide investigative support to missing, unidentified, and unclaimed person cases.
- Fingerprint services to scan, classify, upload, analyze, and compare fingerprint information submitted to NamUs, including collaboration with the Federal Bureau of Investigation (FBI) for searching unidentified decedent prints through the FBI's Next Generation Identification national database.
- Nuclear and mitochondrial DNA analyses through the University of North Texas Center for Human Identification's Missing Persons Unit.
- Forensic odontology services to obtain, code, and upload dental information to NamUs.
- Forensic anthropology services through the Missing Persons Unit.
- Analytical services to assist with locating indication of life for persons reported missing to NamUs, locating family contact information for DNA collections and next of kin death notifications, and locating/vetting tips and leads related to missing and unidentified person cases.

== History ==
In 2003, the National Institute of Justice began funding major efforts to maximize the use of DNA technology in the U.S. criminal justice system, including in the investigation of missing and unidentified person cases. By 2005, the institute expanded its efforts with the “Identifying the Missing Summit”, where criminal justice practitioners, forensic scientists, policymakers, and victim advocates defined major challenges in investigating and solving missing and unidentified decedent cases. As a result of that summit, the Deputy Attorney General created the National Missing Persons Task Force. It identified the need to improve access to information that would help solve missing and unidentified person cases. NamUs was created to meet that need.

In 2007, the NamUs Unidentified Persons database was launched. The following year, the NamUs Missing Persons (MP) database was launched. In 2009, the two databases were connected for automatic case comparisons.

In 2011, daily management of NamUs was transitioned to the University of North Texas Health Science Center, with continued administration and oversight by the National Institute of Justice. Management through the Center for Human Identification at the university enhanced NamUs's ability to facilitate DNA services and enhanced the quality and quantity of DNA information entered into NamUs.

In 2012, an Analytical Division was added to NamUs. Also in 2012, the NamUs AFIS/Fingerprint Unit was created, bringing additional in-house forensic services to NamUs, including a collaboration with the FBI's Latent Print Unit to search all unidentified decedent prints through the Next Generation Identification system.

In May 2018, NamUs 2.0 was released.
