= Baby Hope (disambiguation) =

"Baby Hope" is a term used with unidentified decedent cases, often when the subject would be a young female. It may refer to:

- Anjelica Castillo, who was given the nickname after her discovery in 1991. She was identified in 2013
- St. Louis Jane Doe, found in Missouri in 1983
- Pueblo County Jane Doe, found in Colorado in 1996
