= Unreported missing =

Missing person that hasn't been found yet but cannot be reported as missing

Unreported missing (also known as missing missing) describes persons who cannot be found, yet have not been or cannot be reported as missing persons to law enforcement, specifically to the National Crime Information Center database of missing persons in the United States. The term applies whether the missing person is a child or an adult.

== Reasons ==
According to Outpost for Hope, people can become unreported missing for a variety of reasons, including:

- the person may be estranged from family or friends;
- law enforcement may not take a "missing person" report;
- the person may be in the country illegally;
- the person may be an unknown dependent child of unreported missing adults or teens;
- the person might be the victim of an undiscovered crime; or
- the person may be homeless.

Another reason missing persons may not be formally listed as missing is that those over the age of majority can be "voluntarily missing." Barring evidence of criminality or being a danger to oneself, privacy and confidentiality laws generally protect the rights of those who elect to remain out of contact with family or friends. If an adult unreported missing person is located in such an instance, the police are not obligated to inform the family of the missing person's whereabouts.

Another example is of children born to homeless parents. These children are sometimes not registered anywhere and can become victims of crimes such as human trafficking or forced prostitution without any of their other relatives or local agencies knowing. A study by professor Kenna Quinet states that the "most successful serial killers know to select the unmissed as victims if they intend to kill for an extended period of time", referring to serial killers targeting transient people, as well as those in institutionalized care, because their absence may not be easily noticed.

Foster children are another source of unreported missing people. In the United States, children in foster care are protected by confidentiality laws; their identity and the fact that they are in the foster care system is private information. In the majority of US states, when foster children go missing their name is not publicly released and, with a few exceptions, child protective services representatives will not speak to the public—in some states, biological parents are not even permitted to contact the news media about their fostered child going missing. Based on 2002 statistics, of the approximately 585,000 foster children in the US, 20% are missing at any given time, with 98% thought to be runaways and 2% (2,340) unaccounted for.

There have also been cases of missing persons reports being accidentally purged from databases, leading to those persons becoming unreported missing.

== Risks ==
Being unreported puts a person at a higher risk of exploitation than a person who is reported missing. Of the approximately 2,340 unreported missing foster children in the US (in 2002) who are not accounted for, it is estimated that one in five (468) will be the victim of a homicide.

== Notable cases ==
- Barbara Precht, discovered in 2006 and was not identified until late 2014. She was never reported missing by her husband.
- Anjelica Castillo, discovered in 1991 and was not reported missing due to her mother's fears of deportation, as her family were illegal immigrants.
- Jason Callahan, discovered in 1995, not reported missing until 2015, as his family did not know what jurisdiction to report his disappearance to and thought he may have gone to live on his own and not wanted contact.
- Atcel Olmedo, discovered in 2005 and was not reported missing because of complications with his abusive stepfather.
- Marcia King, discovered in 1981, and was not reported missing for unknown reasons.
- Tina Farmer, discovered in 1985, and was not ever formally reported missing.
- Elizabeth Roberts, discovered in 1977, a 17-year-old runaway and murder victim whose listing was removed from databases upon her 18th birthday.
- Michelle Knight, discovered in 2013, a 21-year-old kidnapping victim (kidnapped in August 2002) whose listing was removed from databases in November 2003, fifteen months after her abduction. On the other hand, the other two abductees, Amanda Berry and Gina DeJesus, were widely reported in the media and extremely well-known.

== See also ==
- Cold case
- Forced disappearance
- International child abduction
- Lists of people who disappeared
