= Suicide of Joyce Meyer Sommers =

1996 suicide of formerly unidentified decedent

Joyce Marilyn Meyer Sommers
- Born: Joyce Marilyn Meyer; July 20, 1927; Davenport, Iowa, U.S.
- Disappeared: c. 1981; Tucson, Arizona, U.S.
- Status: Identified on May 11, 2022 (25 years, 4 months, 3 weeks and 2 days after death)
- Died: December 18, 1996 (aged 69); Annandale, Virginia, U.S.
- Cause of death: Suicide by suffocation
- Body discovered: December 18, 1996; 29 years ago
- Other names: Christmas Tree Lady; Annandale Jane Doe
- Known for: Previously unidentified decedent
- Height: Around 5 ft
- Spouse: James E. Sommers (m. 1959; div. 1977)

Joyce Marilyn Meyer Sommers (July 20, 1927 – December 18, 1996), also known as the Christmas Tree Lady, was a formerly unidentified American woman who died by suicide in a cemetery in Annandale, Virginia, on December 18, 1996. She was identified more than 25 years later on May 11, 2022.

== Life ==
Sommers was born on July 20, 1927, to Arthur Meyer and Margaret Meyer, and had four siblings. She was raised on a farm in Davenport, Iowa, and graduated from Immaculate Conception Academy and then Iowa State University, with a degree in journalism. Sommers then relocated to Los Angeles to work at Seventeen magazine while living with an aunt. After she left the magazine in the 1950s, she taught second grade at a local Catholic elementary school. In 1960, she married Richard E. Reddy, an industrial engineer from South Carolina, and moved with him to Vancouver; they later divorced and she returned to the United States.

Around that time Sommers began seeing a psychiatrist whose treatments of encouraging clients to blame their families, especially their mothers, for their problems alienated Sommers from her family. In the 1960s, Sommers' mother visited her in California, where she had a 24-hour "confrontation session" with her daughter.

Sommers moved to Seattle and married James E. Sommers, but she didn't inform her family of the event. The couple didn't have children and eventually divorced in 1977.

Sommers then moved to a trailer park in Tucson, Arizona, where she was described as being unhappy, according to her siblings. In the early 1980s, Sommers' siblings all visited her; she asked them to help build her a home. However, the siblings refused, which greatly upset Sommers. This visit was the last time Sommers was seen by her family. They believed Sommers joined a cult and moved; they later hired a private investigator to locate her, but this effort ultimately failed, despite several leads.

In the early 1990s, her brother Larry traveled back to Tucson in an attempt to locate her, only to find her trailer abandoned. In it, he discovered four copies of a book, The Target Child, written by Sommers. In the book, she wrote her account of a traumatic upbringing.

== Suicide ==
On December 18, 1996, workers at a cemetery in Annandale, Virginia, discovered the body of a woman. She was found near the section of the cemetery where infants and children are buried. An 8 in (20 cm) Christmas tree, a backpack, a cassette tape player, and headphones were found with her, as well as some money and burial instructions, signed "Jane Doe". Authorities determined that she had killed herself by suffocation, but were unable to identify her.

== Investigation ==
The unidentified woman, nicknamed the Christmas Tree Lady, was reported to be a Caucasian woman around 5 ft 0 in (1.52 m) and between 50 and 70 years old. Hoping to find a match, authorities looked at many nearby reports of missing people, but found no matches. In 2000, a colored sketch of the Christmas Tree Lady was released.

In 2022, the Texas lab Othram conducted tests using DNA, which indicated that David Meyer could be the Christmas Tree Lady's brother. After David Meyer looked at the drawing of the Christmas Tree Lady, he was unable to say whether or not she was his sister because the last time he saw her was decades earlier. The detectives were then told to ask his sister, Annette Meyer Clough. After seeing the drawing, Clough said it was definitely Joyce. DNA was taken from Clough, and the Christmas Tree Lady was identified as Sommers.

Clough speculated that Sommers chose the children's section of the cemetery as a symbolic nod to her belief that parental actions can permanently harm children.

== See also ==
- Lyle Stevik
- Mary Anderson (decedent)
- Unidentified decedent
