= Angela Toler =

Formerly unidentified decedent from North Carolina

Angela Faye Toler
- Born: 1969; Princeton, North Carolina, U.S.
- Disappeared: Richmond, Virginia, U.S.
- Died: c. November 1992 (aged 23); Richmond, Virginia
- Cause of death: Accidental death by hypothermia
- Resting place: Richmond, Virginia
- Parent(s): Delois Sherrod (mother, living)
- Relatives: Sharon (sister, deceased); Cora (sister, living); Edward (brother, living); Wilbert (brother, deceased)

Angela "Angie" Faye Toler was a formerly unidentified decedent who disappeared in Richmond, Virginia, in November 1992, and who was unidentified for 20 years. After moving from Princeton, North Carolina, to Richmond with her boyfriend, Toler fell out of communication with her family. Toler's boyfriend soon moved back to Princeton alone, but Toler was not with him, and friends and family of Toler never heard from her again. In 2011, Nona Best, who was a cousin of Toler, was at a National Missing and Unidentified Persons System (NamUs) academy in Atlanta when a presentation by a Maryland coroner included a picture of an unidentified woman found in Richmond who had died of hypothermia. Best recognized the woman as Angela Toler, and she reached out to Toler's mother and sister as well as Virginia medical examiner Lara Frame to procure DNA samples for comparison. In late July 2012, the unidentified woman was positively identified as Angela Faye Toler. In 2019, a North Carolina state law was passed after being sponsored by State Representative Allen McNeill that would require all law enforcement agencies in the state to enter missing person cases into NamUs after 30 days. McNeill has mentioned being inspired by the story of Best identifying Toler.

== Background ==
Angela Faye Toler was born in Princeton, North Carolina, in 1969. Toler was close with her mother, Delois Sherrod. Toler was one of five siblings. Of the five, three predeceased their mother; Sharon, the eldest sister, died of cancer, and Wilbert, the youngest brother, died of heart failure. Both Sharon and Wilbert died approximately eight years after Angela disappeared. Two siblings, Cora and Edward, were still living as of 2012. Toler's father died before her move to Richmond. Angela Toler graduated from Princeton High School. After graduation, Toler worked at a fast food restaurant. Sherrod has said that part of the reason for Toler moving to a bigger city may have been a goal to find work as a model. Angela was 23 years old when she disappeared.

In 1992, Toler stopped by Sherrod's workplace and said "Mother, I'm fixing to move to Virginia with a friend" by means of announcing her intention to move to Virginia with her boyfriend. The name of Toler's boyfriend was never released to the public. Toler's move to Virginia was not planned very far in advance, and she did not tell friends or family which city she planned to move to, only that it was in Virginia. The last time friends and family of Toler saw or heard from her was shortly before her move to Richmond. The plan was for Toler to call her mother to check in upon her arrival, however she did not contact anyone until the night of her disappearance about a month later.

== Disappearance and death ==
One night in November 1992 approximately a month after Toler's move to Richmond, she called Sherrod at her workplace three separate times. However, Sherrod's supervisor did not allow her to answer the phone. The supervisor said that if Toler called a fourth time, he would allow Sherrod to go to the phone, but Toler did not call again. Toler's friends and family never heard from her again. Sherrod believes that if she had been allowed to answer the phone, Toler might have been alive today. Shortly after Toler's disappearance, Toler's boyfriend returned to Princeton alone. Following his return to Princeton, Sherrod attempted to call the boyfriend, but his mother told Sherrod that he was not in town. After the boyfriend failed to produce a satisfactory explanation for Toler's whereabouts, Toler was officially reported missing. However, without knowledge of which city Toler was in, the police were unable to investigate. Following Toler's identification, Sherrod has stated that she believes that Toler wanted to move back home after things fell through with her boyfriend in Richmond.

In November 1992, after Toler's boyfriend had returned to Princeton, a woman's body was found in Richmond near railroad tracks off Deepwater Terminal Road. The woman was dressed in men's clothes, and all of her clothing was wet. The cause of death was determined to be accidental death caused by hypothermia. Witnesses reported having seen a woman matching the description near where she was found. After identification, family members of Toler have stated that they do not believe she voluntarily laid down by the tracks. However, there is not enough evidence to reopen the investigation. No identification was found on the body, and the body became a Jane Doe. At the time of discovery, DNA samples were taken from the body. Following that the remains were cremated. The cremains were then interred at a cemetery in Virginia. Police never investigated Toler's death as they found nothing to indicate foul play.

== Identification ==
In 2011, Nona Best, a cousin of Toler, was director of the North Carolina Center for Missing Persons (NCCMP). The NCCMP is the state clearinghouse under the North Carolina State Highway Patrol for information pertaining to missing persons. North Carolina's NCCMP works with missing adults as well as children, which is not universal in American states. In November 2011, Best was at a NamUs academy in Atlanta. During a presentation by a coroner from Maryland, a picture was shown of the unidentified woman found in Richmond in 1992. Best recognized the woman as Angela Toler, and after the presentation she asked to see the image again. After returning home to Raleigh, North Carolina, Best contacted Toler's family as well as Lara Frame, who worked in the Office of the Chief Medical Examiner in Virginia. DNA samples were collected via swabbing from Sherrod and Angela's sister, Cora Prince, and sent to the University of North Carolina at Chapel Hill for comparison. On 31 July 2012, Frame reported that the DNA matched. The family was informed by Best and Princeton Police Chief Tyrone Sutton. Several days later, the unidentified woman was publicly identified as Angela Faye Toler.

Two weeks after her identification, a memorial service was held for Toler in Goldsboro, North Carolina. Toler's cremains remained interred in Virginia; however, family members are attempting to get Angela's cremains returned to Princeton for reburial next to her brother and sister.

In 2019, a bill sponsored by North Carolina State Representative Allen McNeill was passed that would require all law enforcement agencies in North Carolina to add all missing persons cases to NamUs after they are unsolved for 30 days,yet there is no penalty for breaking this law. McNeill has stated that he was directly inspired by the story of Best identifying Toler and other similar stories.

== See also ==
- Death of Jason Callahan, a formerly unidentified decedent who died in 1995 of an automobile accident and was identified in 2015
- Disappearance of Asha Degree, a nine year old girl who disappeared in 2000 from Shelby, North Carolina
- List of solved missing person cases: 1950–1999
- National Missing and Unidentified Persons System
