= Norfolk headless body =

Unidentified murder victim in England

- Born: 1939–1951 (approximate)
- Status: Unidentified for 51 years, 5 months and 27 days
- Died: c. First or second week of August 1974 (aged 23–35)
- Cause of death: Murder
- Body discovered: 27 August 1974; Swaffham, Norfolk, England
- Resting place: Swaffham Cemetery, Swaffham, Norfolk, England
- Other names: "The Duchess"
- Known for: Unidentified decedent
- Height: 5 ft 0 in (1.52 m) to 5 ft 2 in (1.57 m)
- Children: At least 1

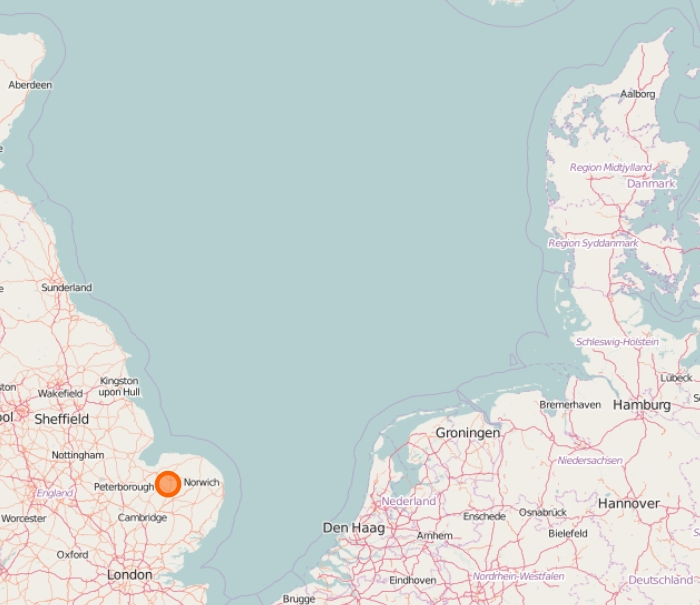
Position of Swaffham, Norfolk, near where the woman's body was found

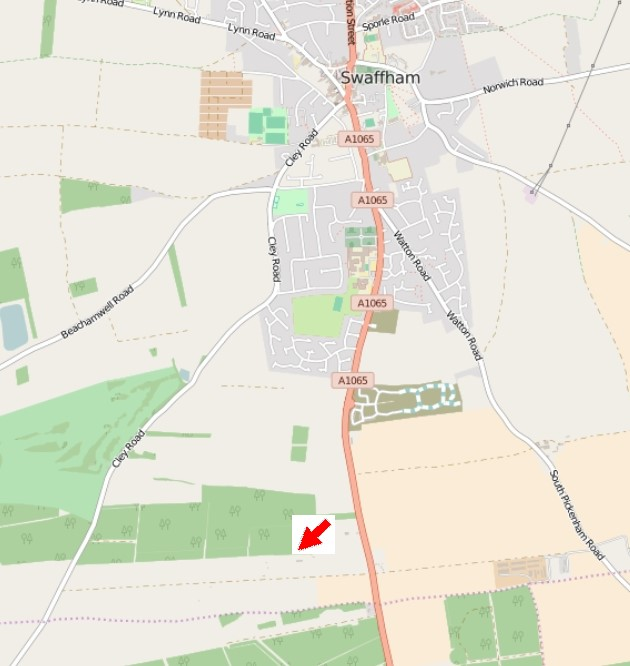
Approximate position of Brake Hill Farm, near Swaffham (arrowed)

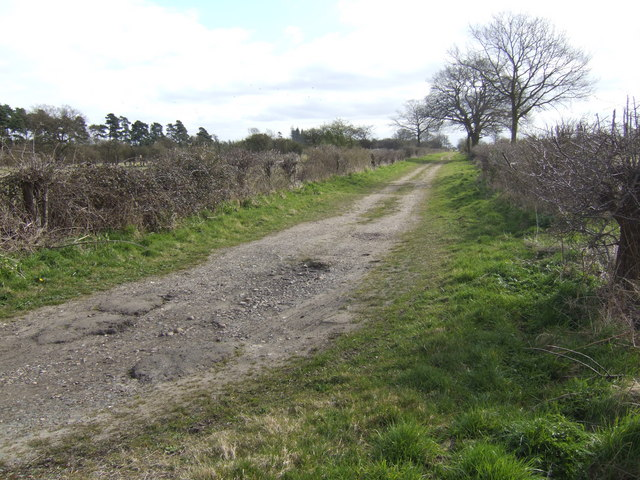
Brake Hill Drove, western end

The Norfolk headless body case relates to a woman who was murdered around the first or second week of August 1974. Her decapitated body was found near Swaffham, Norfolk, England on 27 August 1974. Her head has never been found. Although the woman has never been identified, one theory being investigated is that she was a sex worker known as "The Duchess" who worked the Great Yarmouth docks under that pseudonym prior to her disappearance in mid-1974.

== Death ==
The badly decomposed body of this woman was discovered on 27 August 1974 by a 19-year-old tractor driver named Andrew Head who had been out walking when he found the body on land belonging to Peter Roberts. Head later recalled: "I lifted one corner of the cover over the body and that was enough – I could see what it was. I went home and phoned the police." The body was discovered near a track leading to Brake Hill Farm, Brandon Road, within Cockley Cley. Combine harvesters were used to clear fields to allow them to be searched.

Police believe the woman died in either the first or second week of August 1974. She was estimated to be aged between 23 and 35 and 5 ft 0 in (1.52 m) to 5 ft 2 in (1.57 m) tall. Her hands and legs were bound to her body and she was wearing only a pink 1969 Marks & Spencer nightdress. She had been decapitated and her head has never been found. Her body was wrapped in a plastic sheet embossed with the words National Cash Registers. A collector in the United States identified the cover as being from a payroll machine and the exact model but the enquiry also established that thousands of the machines would have been made with many exported.

With her body was a length of rope that was unusual in being made of four strands, rather than the more usual three or five strands. An expert told police that the composition of the rope "suggests it was made for use with agricultural machinery". Police traced the place of manufacture of the rope to Dundee in Scotland but the firms that made that type of rope have since ceased trading. The first murder enquiry into the death ran from 1974 to 1975 during which time police spoke to 15,000 people and took 700 statements. They completed 6,750 house-to-house questionnaires.

In 2008, Norfolk Police exhumed the woman's body under Operation Monton and took a DNA sample but were unable to identify the woman. They established that she was right-handed, had probably given birth, had consumed water found in Scotland and that fish and crabs formed an important part of her diet. They have issued several appeals for information. In 2008, the case was featured on the BBC's Crimewatch programme. In 2011, police made another appeal and identified 540 missing women as a result of fresh enquiries. In 2016, the case featured on television again and twice in the online version of BBC News. In 2009, police began to examine serial killer Peter Tobin's links to Norfolk via Operation Anagram, to determine whether he could have been involved in the case, or in any other unsolved murders in the county.

== Investigation ==
After the woman's remains were exhumed in 2008, samples of her toenails, hair and thigh bone were subjected to DNA and isotopic analysis. A full DNA profile of the victim was obtained but there was no match with any database, but the independent isotopic analyses carried out by professor Wolfram Meier-Augenstein and another scientist, which looks at the traces left in the body from the water consumed during a person's lifetime, both indicated that she was probably from the central Europe area including Denmark, Germany, Austria and northern Italy. From a second post-mortem examination of the woman, Norfolk police learned that her pelvic girdle had widened which happens during pregnancy to allow a woman to give birth, indicating that she had likely borne at least one child in her lifetime.

Following a call from a former police officer, after the case featured on Crimewatch in 2008, Norfolk police were examining a theory that the woman is "The Duchess"; a sex worker who lived in Great Yarmouth docks and who disappeared in mid-1974 leaving all her possessions behind. "The Duchess" is believed to have arrived in the port town on the Esbjerg Ferry from Denmark. Her clients were often lorry drivers who travelled between Esbjerg and Yarmouth using the ferry, and she also sometimes accompanied drivers on deliveries across England. This woman is understood to have worked as an escort around Great Yarmouth in the mid 1970s. She was aged in her late 20s or early 30s, hailed from Denmark, and regularly travelled between East Anglia and Denmark in 1973–74. She had lived for four or five months in the dockers' hut at the Ocean terminal, and is believed to have also spent time in custody, although contemporary records from this era have been destroyed, and thus the police still do not know this woman's real name. Furthermore, they cannot be sure that the dead woman was indeed "The Duchess".

== See also ==
- List of unsolved murders in the United Kingdom
- St. Louis Jane Doe
