= Vernon County Jane Doe =

Unidentified murder victim

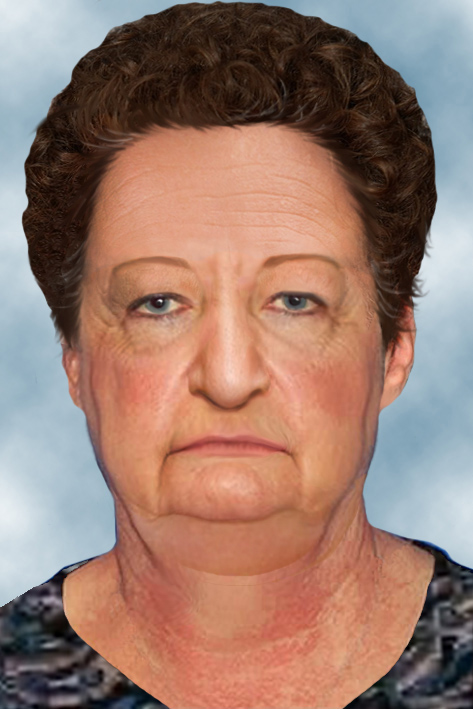
- Forensic facial reconstruction of the Vernon County Jane Doe
- Born: Approx. 1919–1934
- Status: Unidentified for 42 years, 1 month and 15 days
- Died: c. May 3, 1984 (aged 50 to 65); Westby, Wisconsin, United States
- Cause of death: Homicide by blunt force trauma
- Body discovered: May 4, 1984
- Resting place: Viroqua Cemetery in Vernon County, Wisconsin
- Known for: Unidentified victim of homicide
- Height: Between 5 ft 5 in (1.65 m) and 5 ft 6 in (1.68 m)

Vernon County Jane Doe is an American murder victim whose body was found on May 4, 1984. Her identity remains unknown. Her hands had been cut off by the perpetrator, likely to prevent identification by means of fingerprinting.

The case has been heavily investigated since discovery of the body, with no progress toward finding either her identity or her murderer.

== Discovery of the body ==
The body was found at 11:15 p.m. on May 4, 1984, near the town of Westby, Wisconsin, by three teenagers within 24 to 48 hours after her death. There was extensive damage to the victim's head, which left her face unrecognizable until mortuary procedures were conducted. After the case was broadcast on the news, a couple stated that they had seen a suspicious man near the location. He was returning to the driver's seat of a yellow car, believed to be a 1982 Datsun. When police went to the spot, they found tire tracks from a hasty U-turn. A broken denture, blood, and a man's watch were also found there. Because of this evidence, it is believed that she was killed at another location alongside the same road, and that her body was then taken to the location where she was found.

The victim had been murdered, as she suffered blunt force injury to her head, which had broken her jaw, an eye socket and the pair of dentures that she was wearing. There was also sharp-force trauma to the left side of the head, near the ear. Her hands had been removed, most likely to prevent identification through fingerprint matching.

== Description and clothing ==
Vernon County Jane Doe was a white woman between 50 and 65 years old. She had graying brown hair, presumed to have been done in a perm. She was 5 feet 5 to 5 feet 6 inches (approximately 170 cm). She did not appear to have any unique physical features. She weighed 150 pounds (68 kg) and had worn dentures, probably those that were found with her body. The dentures, missing two teeth, had both raised and indented numbers upon them, believed to be serial numbers. Despite this, investigators have stated that serial numbers for the given product were not assigned to specific recipients, which would not yield clues to the victim's identity.

She was wearing a multicolored coat, a black dress decorated with a blue-and-white paisley print, a blue turtleneck sweater, and nylon stockings. The brand labels of the clothing had been removed. There were distinctive buttons on her clothes; these had unique stitching.

== Investigation ==
Over 4,000 leads have surfaced in the case, one recently being the arrest of multiple persons who fraudulently used checks from a missing Amherst, Wisconsin woman who disappeared around the same time as when the Jane Doe was found.

Despite the possible link to Amherst, police believe that she did not reside in the area where she was found. Seven missing women have been ruled out as possible identities.

Authorities have used news media multiple times toward identifying the victim. In 2012, officials "pushed" the case to reach areas of both Minnesota and Wisconsin that were linked to Highway 14. The case was broadcast in a three-day news special, titled "Catching Her Killer: Justice for Jane Doe," to uncover new leads in 2013. Yet no lead so far has proved useful.

She was interred in the Viroqua cemetery. Her headstone bears the words "Jane Doe" and the date of the discovery of her body.

On August 12, 2015, her body was exhumed and sent to the crime lab in Madison, Wisconsin, for testing in hopes of identifying her. The body was returned and buried the next day. DNA was also harvested and began processing at the University of North Texas. A new forensic facial reconstruction of the victim was released in December 2015 by a university in Arizona that created the likeness based on physical characteristics of the woman's skull. The rendering was completed by forensic artist Catyana Falsetti, whose husband was also working on the case at the university.

Forensic testing on the pollen present on the victim's clothing in 2018 indicated she may have originated from Arizona or New Mexico.

Authorities would later seek assistance from the DNA Doe Project in hopes to identify the victim. Around June 28, 2023, DNA Doe Project announced on their webpage about the victim that she is now being investigated by another forensic genetic genealogy service. So far, this provider has not been named.

== Gallery ==
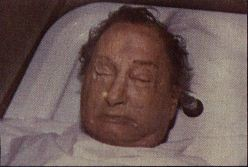
Morgue photograph

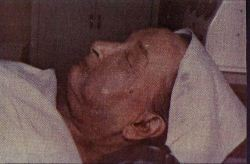
Morgue photograph

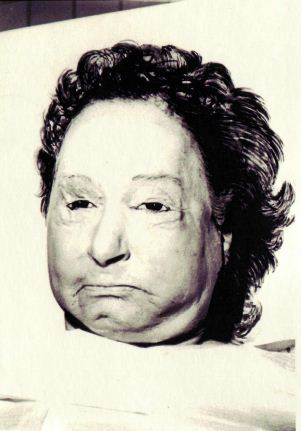
Morgue photograph

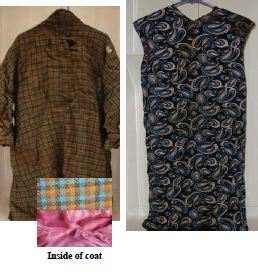
Dress and coat

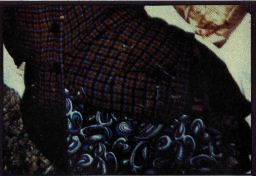
Upper portions of clothing

Shoe

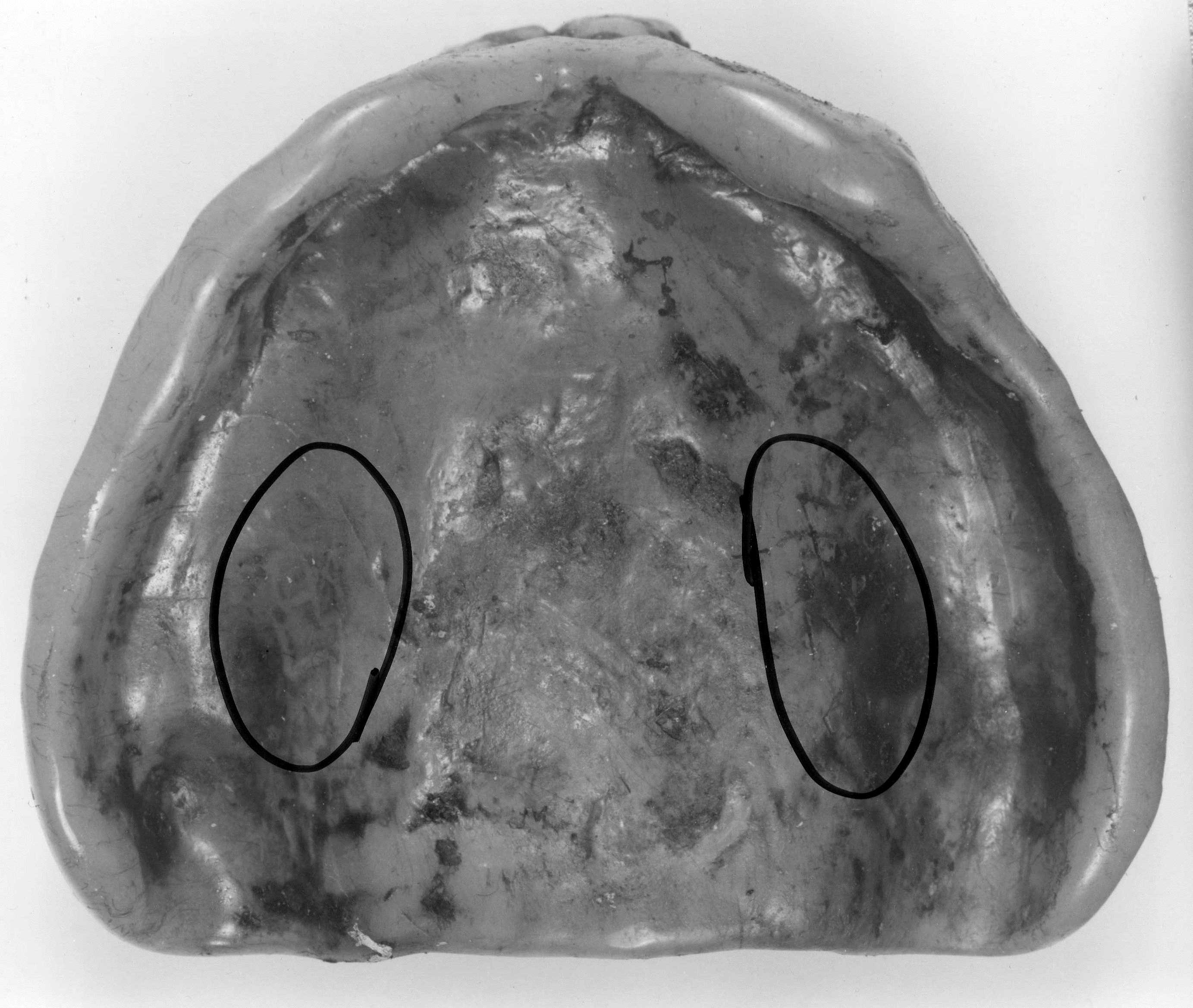
Upper denture

== See also ==
- List of unsolved murders (1980–1999)
