= Mary Anderson (decedent) =

Unidentified person (died 1996)

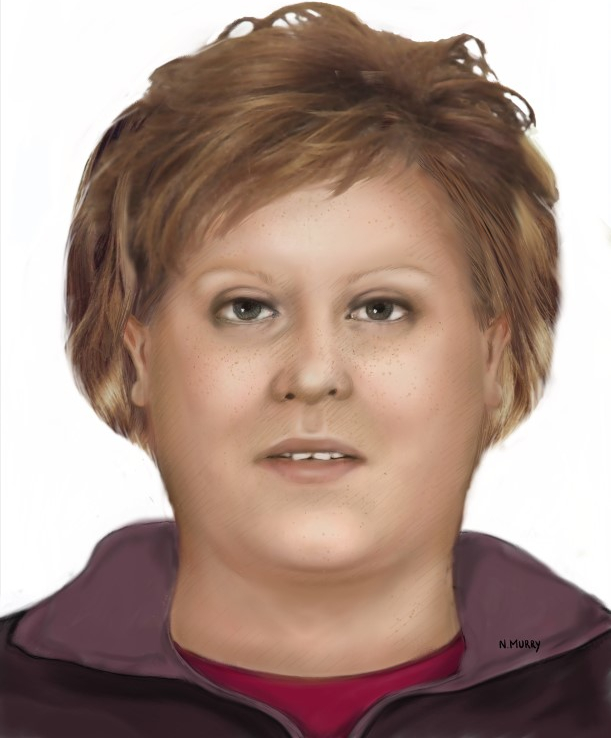
- Digital forensic facial reconstruction by Natalie Murry
- Born: c. 1945–1966
- Status: Unidentified for 30 years, 1 month and 4 days
- Died: October 9–11, 1996 (aged 30–50); Seattle, Washington, U.S.
- Cause of death: Suicide by cyanide poisoning
- Body discovered: October 11, 1996
- Resting place: Crown Hill Cemetery, Seattle
- Known for: Unidentified decedent
- Height: 5 ft 8 in (1.73 m)

Mary A. Anderson is the pseudonym that was used by an unknown woman who committed suicide in a hotel room in Seattle in October 1996. Investigations by multiple agencies have failed to identify her.

== Death and discovery of the body ==
On October 9, the woman reserved a room by telephone at the Hotel Vintage Park, 1100 5th Avenue, about 90 minutes before checking in. She arrived with two bags and paid cash for two nights. In the hotel's register, she entered the name "Mary A. Anderson," along with an address and telephone number in New York City, all of which investigators later determined to be false.

On October 11, her body was discovered by hotel staff after she failed to check out. She was found reclining in the bed, clasping a Bible to her chest with the pages open to Psalm 23. A suicide note was found on the bedside table. She left no identification. The medical examiner later determined she had consumed a lethal amount of cyanide and ruled her death a suicide. Her suicide note read:

"To Whom It May Concern.

I have decided to end my life and no one is responsible for my death.

Mary Anderson.

P.S. I have no relatives. You can use my body as you choose."

She was white, estimated to be between in her mid-30s to early 50s, and well-groomed with manicured nails and neatly combed hair. She had a copper intrauterine device inserted and she appeared to have had breast surgery at some point in her life.

== Investigation ==
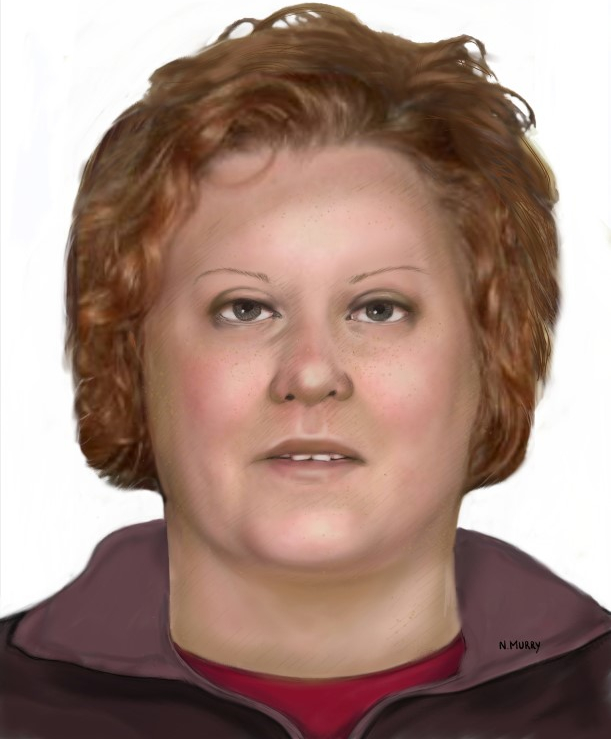
Additional facial reconstruction

When her hotel registration information proved false, investigators unsuccessfully attempted to identify her through fingerprint records on file with the FBI, as well as through missing person reports filed in the U.S., Canada, and through Interpol. They were also unable to trace the origins of the cyanide she had used to end her life. The medical examiner's office stated that the woman had "intentionally obliterated" any means of identification.

Othram Inc. was contacted to assist with her identification in May 2021.

In 2023, advanced DNA testing suggested that her biogeographical origins connected to Eastern Iran or Afghanistan, with some likely Persian heritage.

== See also ==
- Lyle Stevik, discovered in Aberdeen, Washington in 2001 after using an alias prior to his suicide.
- Unidentified decedent
- Plaquemines Parish John Doe another unidentified decedent who killed himself in 1975.
