= The Gentleman of Heligoland =

Unidentified decedent found in the sea off Heligoland in 1994

- Born: c. 1944–1949
- Status: Unidentified for 32 years, 3 months and 16 days
- Died: c. 1994 (aged 45–50)
- Body discovered: 11 July 1994 Heligoland, Germany
- Other name: North Sea Man
- Known for: Unidentified decedent
- Height: 6 ft 5 in (196 cm)

Locations
1 Heligoland, body discovered and recovered.
2 AJ Cobblers where shoes were repaired, Bristol.

The Gentleman of Heligoland is the nickname of an unidentified decedent whose body was found in the waters off Heligoland in 1994. His body showed signs of having been beaten and his death is a suspected case of murder. Another name for the unidentified decedent is North Sea Man.

== Discovery ==
A border guard boat retrieved the body on 11 July 1994, 20 km (12 mi) off the west side of Heligoland. Police believe that the body may have travelled some distance in the water.

== Investigation ==
An autopsy in 1994 showed that the deceased had suffered blunt force violence to his head and upper body while he was still alive. His height was 6 feet 5 inches (196 cm) and German authorities estimated his age at the time of his death to have been between 45 and 50. He was nicknamed "The Gentleman" because he was smartly dressed.

=== Exhumation ===
In December 2021, the body was exhumed and DNA extracted to compare against databases of known samples. Researchers at Staffordshire University and Plymouth Marjon University are working with the German Police Academy of Lower Saxony and Locate International to identify him.

=== Public appeals ===
In February 2022, police released a photofit and new information on the deceased as part of an appeal to the media to identify him. It was revealed that his tie was made by Marks & Spencer for English and French language markets, which included Canada at the time.

It was also revealed that his body had two cast iron shoe lasts attached to it. Each weighed 3 kilograms (6.6 lb), were based on female feet and bore the initials AJK, the trademark of AJ Jackson in Bristol.

Police also wished to dispel the notion that the man was wealthy, as the tie had been manufactured in large numbers and the shoes had been repaired and may have been secondhand.

As of 28 April 2022, the police had received over 50 pieces of information since the appeal.

On 14 March 2023, the case was featured on the Dutch TV-programme Opsporing Verzocht. The appeal featured the new photofit and an interview with Karsten Bettels, director of Crime Fighting at the Police Academy of Lower Saxony, about the circumstances in which the decedent was found. Bettels said the name 'The Gentleman' seemed fitting at first sight, because the decedent was smartly dressed. However, because of the elite connotation of the word 'gentleman', the name does not really fit.

=== Bone analysis ===
A radio isotope analysis conducted in 2022 at Murdoch University determined that The Gentleman may have spent most of his life in Australia.
