= Angel of the Meadow =

Unidentified murder victim found in 2010

Coordinates: 53.4873441°N 2.2368292°W

- Born: 1950–1954; Europe or Middle East
- Status: Unidentified for 16 years
- Died: 1970–1980 (aged 15–30)
- Body discovered: 25 January 2010; Manchester, England
- Resting place: Southern Cemetery, Manchester
- Known for: Unidentified murder victim
- Height: 5 ft 1 in (1.55 m) to 5 ft 7 in (1.70 m)

The Angel of the Meadow is the name given by the media to an unidentified murder victim whose remains were discovered in 2010 in Angel Meadow, Manchester, United Kingdom. Despite an extensive international investigation, neither the woman's identity nor that of her killer has ever been established.

== Discovery of the body ==
The body was discovered on 25 January 2010 at the site of a former car park located between Angel Street, Dantzic Street and Miller Street in Manchester, England. The area is known as Angel Meadow and was the location of a notorious Victorian slum which Friedrich Engels notably referred to as "hell upon earth". At the time of the discovery, the site was being prepared for redevelopment into the new head offices for the Co-operative Group. A workman noticed a skull, which led to the discovery of a human skeleton concealed underneath sections of blue carpet. The police were called to the scene at 15:50.

== Description of the victim ==
The victim had suffered a fractured neck, clavicle and jaw. The police initially believed that the woman was aged 18–35 when she died. The date of her death was identified as the 1970s or 80s. Police believe the woman was born between 1950 and 1954. In life the victim was a size 12 and her height was between 5 ft 1in and 5 ft 7in. She was probably European but possibly from India or the Middle East. The victim had a number of fillings and her first upper right premolar was missing, which would have been apparent in life when she smiled.

The victim was wearing a blue jumper, blue brassiere, a green pinafore dress and black stiletto court shoes (of which only one was found). The pinafore dress was distinctive in that it had large buttons and a unique 1970s-style pattern.

A number of items were found with or near the body: a plastic Guinness measuring chart from the late 1960s, an orange patterned carpet, dark blue and blue carpets, tights and a handbag. One of the carpet pieces which covered the body was thought by police to have been removed from a Ford Cortina and featured a hole cut for a gear stick.

== Initial investigation ==
The death was initially treated as non-suspicious until the postmortem revealed that the woman had suffered a violent death, the details of which were not released to the public. The investigation commenced with a search of missing person records and an appeal to the public in a hope that someone would recognise the items recovered with the body.

== Subsequent investigations ==
In May 2011, police revealed a facial reconstruction of the woman. On 24 May 2011 the reconstruction featured on an episode of the BBC Crimewatch programme. At this time, police confirmed that the victim's dentistry did not match the dental records of three women known to have gone missing from the Greater Manchester area: Helen Sage (missing 1997), Zoe Simpson (missing 1996) and Helen McCourt (murdered 1988). DNA analysis done in 2011 to try to establish whether the woman was a victim of either Peter Tobin or Ronald Castree, who were killers known to be active at the time, showed that there was no connection.

In November 2012, the police announced they had compiled a list that comprised 18 potential identities for the victim which increased to 21–22 following input from the public. The police stated that the strongest candidate for the potential identity of the victim was an individual from Tanzania who had been brought to their attention after a Tanzanian family had made contact. Additional leads were investigated from Ireland, the United States and the Netherlands.

In March 2015, the remains of the victim were buried in an unmarked grave in Southern Cemetery, Manchester, in a ceremony attended only by the two police detectives who were working on the case. In March 2015, police confirmed that they had a DNA profile of the victim and there were undertaking a familial DNA search as part of the investigation.

In 2018, investigative journalists Chris Clark and Tim Hicks suggested that the Angel of the Meadow case could be connected to convicted killer Christopher Halliwell.
