= Smurfette Jane Doe =

Unidentified teenaged decedent found in 2012

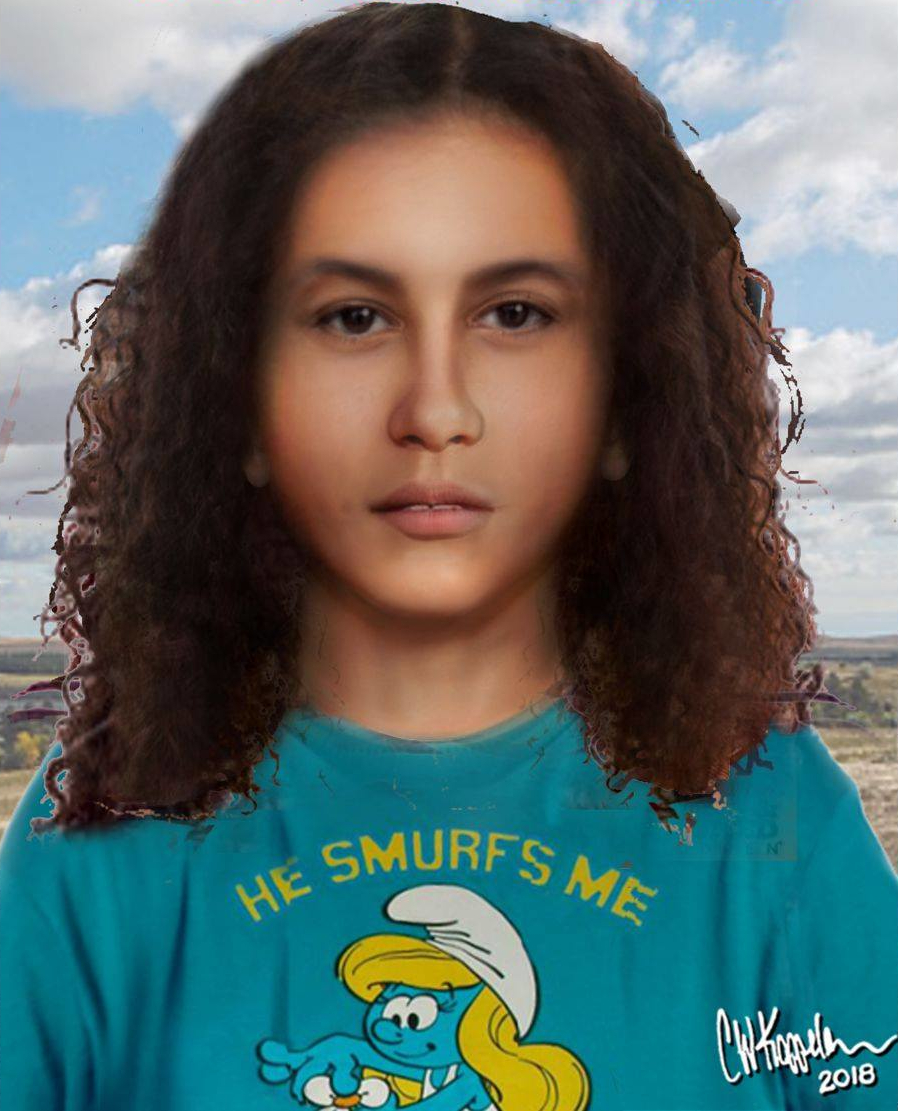
- Facial reconstruction of Smurfette Jane Doe by Carl Koppelman
- Born: c. 1994–1997; Possibly South Texas
- Status: Unidentified for 13 years, 11 months and 17 days
- Died: c. September 2012 (aged 15–17)
- Cause of death: Homicide
- Body discovered: October 16, 2012; Houston, Texas, U.S.
- Known for: Unidentified victim of homicide
- Height: Between 4 ft 7 in (1.40 m) and 5 ft 3 in (1.60 m)

Smurfette Jane Doe is the nickname given to an unidentified teenaged girl who was found dead by a driver in Houston, Texas on October 16, 2012. The decedent derived this nickname from the distinctive shirt she was discovered in, which bore an image of the cartoon character Smurfette. The decedent was found concealed in a black plastic garbage bag on the side of a busy road, beside a gravel road leading to an oil field. Due to advanced decomposition, a cause of death could not be determined, but the effort to conceal the decedent strongly indicates homicide. Examination of the decedent's bones revealed that she had a facial asymmetry, and that she had likely been either malnourished or ill during her childhood. The decedent was interred in an anonymous grave in a Harris County cemetery.

== Discovery of the body ==
Locations
1 Walters Road, Houston

On 16 October 2012, a driver in Houston stopped to look for their hubcap on the side of Walters Road, near Fallbrook Church. Although this stretch of Walters Road is heavily trafficked, it has very few reasons to stop on the side of the road. The driver discovered the body of the deceased hidden among discarded trash near a gated gravel driveway leading to a private oil field, 20–25 feet from a fork in the road. The decedent was found curled up in the fetal position, and was partially skeletonized, indicating a post-mortem interval of 3 to 6 weeks. She was missing her left hand and foot, likely due to animal activity in the area. It is likely that the victim died at some point in September 2012.

The decedent was determined to be a teenaged female between the ages of 15 and 17 years old. She was probably mixed race, most likely African American and Caucasian. She had shoulder-length curly dark brown hair, held back from her face with a bobby pin. Examination suggested that the decedent had purple hair dye in her hair at some point. The decedent was found fully clothed. She wore size 5 cargo pants, and a distinctive blue-green shirt bearing an image of the cartoon character Smurfette, with text reading "HE SMURFS ME/HE SMURFS ME NOT". However, the decedent was also found wearing adult women's lingerie, consisting of a pink thong and a black bra. The presence of these items despite her age and childish outfit has led investigators to suspect the victim was involved in sex trafficking. Additionally, the area where her corpse was found was known as a hub for brothels. A common contributing factor which makes girls vulnerable to sex trafficking is estrangement, which may be the reason why the victim has not been identified.

== Investigation ==
Because the decedent’s remains were in advanced decomposition, a cause of death could not be determined. However, concealment efforts strongly suggest foul play. Several findings discovered during the autopsy indicate that the girl had been impoverished or in ill health prior to her death. Growth arrest lines in her thigh bones showed arrested bone development that may have been caused by malnutrition or disease during her childhood. The decedent had a very small bodily frame, likely stood between 4'7 and 5 feet tall, and only had 22 ribs instead of the standard 24. The girl's skull also had a pronounced overbite, and a facial asymmetry that may have been visible during life, which was possibly caused by an illness or syndrome. The victim had received dental work previously in her life, but had heavy tooth decay at the time of her death. Dental work showed fillings on 3 lower molars. Isotope analysis indicated that the girl was not from Houston, but was instead from somewhere in South Texas, likely San Antonio or Austin. Investigators on the case have reached out to contacts in law enforcement south of the Mexico–United States border, as it is possible that the girl or her living relatives were not from the United States. Another lead that was investigated was the origin of the girl's distinctive shirt, but investigators were unable to trace it back to any retailer. Because of the victim's age, the case is being assisted by the National Center for Missing & Exploited Children. At least 17 girls have been ruled out as the victim.

== See also ==
- List of murdered American children
- List of unsolved murders (2000–present)
- Murder of Amy Yeary
- National Center for Missing & Exploited Children
