= Wolfram Meier-Augenstein =

Wolfram Meier-Augenstein FRSC
- Born: September 1959 (age 66)
- Occupation: Forensic science

Wolfram Meier-Augenstein is an emeritus professor at Robert Gordon University, Aberdeen, UK, a Fellow of the Royal Society of Chemistry, a member of the advisory board of the journal Rapid Communications in Mass Spectrometry and a member of the editorial board of the journal Isotopes in Environmental and Health Studies for the topics/disciplines ‘stable isotope tracer & methodology’.

== Biography ==
Meier-Augenstein was born in September 1959. He completed his studies in Chemistry and Molecular Genetics at the Ruprechts Karl University of Heidelberg, Germany in 1987. He is a certified radiation protection officer and served as such at the Institute of Organic Chemistry from 1986 to 1989. He holds a doctorate in natural sciences (Dr. rer. nat.) awarded by the Ruprechts Karl University of Heidelberg in 1989. The subject of his PhD thesis was the structure/activity relationship of stereoisomers of the Periodic Leaf Movement Factor 1 that triggers the nastic leaf movement of Mimosa pudica. As Feodor-Lynen-Fellow of the Alexander von Humboldt Foundation and PD Fellow of the South African Research Foundation he spent one and a half years as post-doctoral fellow with Prof. B.V. Burger at the Stellenbosch University. Here he synthesised and studied cyclodextrin derivatives used as chiral selectors for selective gas chromatography. From there, his career took him to the University Children's Hospital Heidelberg, the University of California, San Diego, the University of Dundee, the Queen's University Belfast and back to Scotland, first to the James Hutton Institute, Dundee and finally Robert Gordon University, Aberdeen.

While at the University Children's Hospital Heidelberg he designed and developed the first GC(/MS)-C-IRMS instrument for simultaneous compound identification and compound specific isotope analysis of the various constituents of a complex sample. Building this hyphenated MS/IRMS hybrid was supported by Finnigan MAT (as then was) and Dr Willie Brand (Finnigan MAT) who designed and built the interface for splitting the flow from the gas chromatograph in the ratio needed to meet specifications and requirement of both the ion trap mass spectrometer and the Delta S isotope ratio mass spectrometer.

From 2010 to 2014 he served as Director of the Forensic Isotope Ratio Mass Spectrometry Network (FIRMS). while from 2009 to 2013 he was a Council member of the British Association for Human Identification (BAHID). He was one of the scientists consulted by the Garda Síochána investigating the case of the dismembered torso found in the Dublin Royal Canal. This case gained notoriety under the name Scissor Sisters. He was also one of the scientists consulted by the police investigating the Norfolk headless body case.

Most recently Meier-Augenstein was involved with the investigation of the death of Lamduan Armitage dubbed "The Lady of the Hills" and the "Thai Bride". His interpretation of stable isotopic signatures obtained from remains of the murder victim corroborated one line of investigation that the victim might have grown up in Thailand. A subsequently launched public appeal received a response from a Thai family who believed the victim could be their daughter. DNA tests finally confirmed the identity of the victim as Lamduan Armitage, née Seekanya, originally from Thailand who had moved to the UK in 1991.

He is the author of the 2010 book Stable Isotope Forensics, the first textbook dedicated to principles and forensic applications of stable isotope analytical techniques, which since has been extensively up-dated. The second edition, Stable Isotope Forensics - Methods and Forensic Applications of Stable Isotope Analysis, was published in 2018.

On 26 December 2022 Meier-Augenstein appeared in the 2022 Royal Institution Christmas Lectures, with the title 'Secrets of Forensic Science', delivered by Sue Black, Baroness Black of Strome.

== Selected publications ==
=== Articles ===
- W. Meier-Augenstein, W. Brand, G.F. Hoffmann, D. Rating (1994). “Bridging the Information Gap between Isotope Ratio Mass Spectrometry and Conventional Mass Spectrometry”. Biol. Mass Spectrom. 23, 376-378.
- W. Meier-Augenstein (1995). “On-line Recording of ^{13}C/^{12}C Ratios and Mass Spectra in one Gas Chromatographic Analysis”. J. High Resolut. Chromatogr. 18, 28-32.
- Meier-Augenstein, W. (2002). "Stable Isotopic Analysis of Fatty Acids by Gas Chromatography - Isotope Ratio Mass Spectrometry". Anal. Chim. Acta. 465 (1–2): 63–79. doi:10.1016/s0003-2670(02)00194-0.
- W. Meier-Augenstein and R. H. Liu: "Forensic Applications of Isotope Ratio Mass Spectrometry", in Advances in Forensic Application of Mass Spectrometry by Jehuda Yinon [ed.], CRC Press, Boca Raton, Florida (USA), (2003), chapter 4, 149 - 180, ISBN 0-8493-15220.
- Farmer, N.; Meier-Augenstein, W.; Kalin, R.M. (2005). "Stable Isotope Analysis of Safety Matches using IRMS - A Forensic Case Study". Rapid Commun. Mass Spectrom. 19 (22): 3182–3186. doi:10.1002/rcm.2088. PMID 16220465.
- W. Meier-Augenstein: "Stable Isotope Fingerprinting", in Forensic Human Identification: An Introduction by S. M. Black & T.J.U. Thomson [eds.], CRC Press, Boca Raton, Florida (USA), (2006), chapter 2, 29-53, ISBN 0-8493-39545.
- Fraser, I.; Meier-Augenstein, W.; Kalin, R.M. (2006). "The Role of Stable Isotopes in Human Identification: A longitudinal study into the variability of isotope signals in human hair and nails". Rapid Commun. Mass Spectrom. 20 (7): 1109–1116. Bibcode:2006RCMS...20.1109F. doi:10.1002/rcm.2424. PMID 16521167.
- Fraser, I.; Meier-Augenstein, W. (2007). "Stable 2H isotope analysis of human hair and nails can aid forensic human identification". Rapid Commun. Mass Spectrom. 21 (20): 3279–3285. doi:10.1002/rcm.3209. PMID 17879389.
- Meier-Augenstein, W.; Fraser, I. (2008). "Forensic stable isotope analysis leads to identification of a mutilated murder victim". Science & Justice. 48 (3): 153–159. doi:10.1016/j.scijus.2007.10.010. PMID 18953804.
- Lock, Claire M.; Meier-Augenstein, Wolfram (2008). "Investigation of isotopic linkage between precursor and product in the synthesis of a high explosive". Forensic Science International. 179 (2–3): 157–162. doi:10.1016/j.forsciint.2008.05.015. PMID 18632231.
- Farmer, N.; Meier-Augenstein, W.; Lucy, D. (2009). "Isotope Analysis of White Paints and Likelihood Ratios". Science & Justice. 49 (2): 114–119. doi:10.1016/j.scijus.2009.02.003. PMID 19606590.
- NicDaéid, N.; Meier-Augenstein, W.; Kemp, H.F. (2011). "Investigating the provenance of un-dyed spun cotton fibre using multi-isotope profiles and chemometric analysis". Rapid Commun. Mass Spectrom. 25 (13): 1812–1816. doi:10.1002/rcm.5046. PMID 21638356.
- Meier-Augenstein, W.; Kemp, H.F.; Hardy, S. (2012). "Detection of Counterfeit Scotch Whisky by Bulk 2H and 18O Stable Isotope Analysis". Food Chemistry. 133: 1070–1074. doi:10.1016/j.foodchem.2012.01.084.
- NicDaéid, N.; Meier-Augenstein, W.; Kemp, H.F.; Sutcliffe, O.B. (2012). "Using isotopic fractionation to link precursor to product in the synthesis of (±)-mephedrone. A new tool for combating 'legal high' drugs". Anal. Chem. 84 (20): 8691–8696. doi:10.1021/ac3019069. PMID 22954152.
- Meier-Augenstein, Wolfram; Kemp, Helen F. (2012). "Stable Isotope Analysis: Bone and Teeth". Wiley Encyclopedia of Forensic Science. doi:10.1002/9780470061589.fsa1042. ISBN 9780470061589.
- Meier-Augenstein, Wolfram; Kemp, Helen F. (2012). "Stable Isotope Analysis: Hair and Nails". Wiley Encyclopedia of Forensic Science. doi:10.1002/9780470061589.fsa1043. ISBN 9780470061589.
- Meier-Augenstein, W.; Hobson, K.A.; Wassenaar, L.I. (2013). "Critique: Measuring Hydrogen Stable Isotope Abundance of Proteins to Infer Origins of Wildlife, Food, and People". Bioanalysis. 5 (7): 751–767. doi:10.4155/BIO.13.36. PMID 23534421.
- NicDaéid, N.; Jayamana, S.; Kerr, W.J.; Meier-Augenstein, W.; Kemp, H.F. (2013). "Influence of precursor solvent extraction on stable isotope signatures of methamphetamine prepared from pseudo-ephedrine extracted from over-the-counter medicines using the Moscow and Hypophosphorous routes". Anal. Bioanal. Chem. 405 (9): 2931–2941. doi:10.1007/s00216-012-6600-8. PMID 23241818. S2CID 33010446.
- W. Meier-Augenstein: "Forensic Isotope Analysis" in McGraw-Hill Yearbook of Science & Technology 2014, pp 120–124, (2014); ISBN 978-0071831062.
- Meier-Augenstein, W.; Kemp, H.F.; Schenk, E.R.; Almirall, J.R. (2014). "Discrimination of unprocessed cotton on the basis of geographic origin using multi-element stable isotope signatures". Rapid Commun. Mass Spectrom. 28 (5): 545–552. Bibcode:2014RCMS...28..545M. doi:10.1002/rcm.6811. PMID 24497293.
- Meier-Augenstein, W. (2019). "Forensic stable isotope signatures: comparing, geo-locating, detecting linkage". WIREs Forensic Sci. e133928 (5) e1339. doi:10.1002/wfs2.1339. S2CID 201302368.
- Meier-Augenstein, W. (2019). "From stable isotope ecology to forensic isotope ecology - isotopes' tales". Forensic Sci. Int. 300: 89–98. doi:10.1016/j.forsciint.2019.04.023. PMID 31085431. S2CID 150365662.

=== Books ===
- Stable Isotope Forensics: An Introduction to the Forensic Application of Stable Isotope Analysis. Wiley, 2010. ISBN 978-0-470-51705-5
- Stable Isotope Forensics: Methods and Forensic Applications of Stable Isotope Analysis, 2nd Edition. Wiley, 2018. ISBN 978-1-119-08020-6
