= Campbellsport, Wisconsin =

- Village
- Seal
- Motto: "It Takes a Village"
- Location of Campbellsport in Fond du Lac County, Wisconsin.
- Coordinates: 43°35′51″N 88°16′50″W
- Country: United States
- State: Wisconsin
- County: Fond du Lac

Government
  - President of the Board of Trustees: David Krebs
  - Board of Trustees: List: Janet Hafemann; Gene Wenzlaff; Marianne Jarmuz; Mark Reseburg; Randy Zielieke; Daniel Boldt

Area
  - Total: 1.36 sq mi (3.51 km^{2})
  - Land: 1.34 sq mi (3.46 km^{2})
  - Water: 0.023 sq mi (0.06 km^{2})
- Elevation: 1,027 ft (313 m)

Population (2020)
  - Total: 1,907
  - Density: 1,433.8/sq mi (553.6/km^{2})
- Time zone: UTC-6 (Central (CST))
  - Summer (DST): UTC-5 (CDT)
- Area code: 920
- FIPS code: 55-12325
- GNIS feature ID: 1562687
- Website: campbellsport.govoffice.com

Campbellsport is a village in Fond du Lac County, Wisconsin, United States. The population was 1,907 at the 2020 census.

It is situated in the rolling hills of the Northern Kettle Moraine in Southeastern Wisconsin and is located on State Highway 67, between US Highways 41 and 45.

== Overview ==
The village was named after Stuart Campbell, an early settler. It was also called Campbell's Port or West New Cassel. Campbellsport was incorporated in 1902, absorbing the older nearby village of New Cassel.

The Milwaukee River flows through the east side of village and a discontinued railroad line is now a recreational trail, on the west side of the community. The local public school system serves the village as well as a large number of surrounding townships, the middle school and high school are located in Campbellsport, and the two elementary schools are located in Campbellsport and Eden. The area also has three private elementary schools, and busing is available to two private high schools in Fond du Lac.

Campbellsport has a well-equipped volunteer Fire Department that also operates an EMT ambulance service for the surrounding area. There is one medical clinic, a chiropractor and two dental offices in the village. There are currently two village parks and a growing library. The library provides computers and wireless internet services. The Campbellsport Athletic Association offers a summer program of activities for the youth of the area.

In 2008, the body of a female was discovered near Campbellsport. The identity of the individual found remained a mystery until 2021, when she was identified as Amy Yeary.

== Geography ==
Campbellsport is located at 43°35′51″N 88°16′50″W (43.597538, -88.280600).

According to the United States Census Bureau, the village has a total area of 1.35 square miles (3.50 km^{2}), of which 1.33 square miles (3.44 km^{2}) is land and 0.02 square miles (0.05 km^{2}) is water. However, the Milwaukee River flows just east of the village.

== Parks and Recreation ==
Campbellsport has two main parks: Fireman's Park located on the west end of town, and Columbus Parc, located on the east end of town. The Eisenbahn State Trail also passes through the village.

The Campbellsport Athletic Association (CAA) acts as the greater Campbellsport community's recreation department.

== Demographics ==
Historical population
| Census | Pop. | Note | %± |
|---|---|---|---|
| 1880 | 319 | | — |
| 1910 | 650 | | — |
| 1920 | 730 | | 12.3% |
| 1930 | 789 | | 8.1% |
| 1940 | 1,094 | | 38.7% |
| 1950 | 1,254 | | 14.6% |
| 1960 | 1,472 | | 17.4% |
| 1970 | 1,681 | | 14.2% |
| 1980 | 1,740 | | 3.5% |
| 1990 | 1,732 | | −0.5% |
| 2000 | 1,913 | | 10.5% |
| 2010 | 2,016 | | 5.4% |
| 2020 | 1,907 | | −5.4% |
U.S. Decennial Census

=== 2020 census ===
As of the 2020 census, there were 1,907 people, and 776 households. The population density was 1,433.8 inhabitants per square mile (553.6/km^{2}). There were 800 housing units at an average density of 601.5 per square mile (232.2/km^{2}). The racial makeup of the village was 95.5% White, 0.4% Black or African American, 0.2% Native American, 0.2% Asian, 0.6% from other races, and 3.1% from two or more races. Hispanic or Latino of any race were 2.2% of the population.

=== 2010 census ===
As of the census of 2010, there were 2,016 people, 763 households, and 504 families living in the village. The population density was 1,515.8 inhabitants per square mile (585.3/km^{2}). There were 823 housing units at an average density of 618.8 per square mile (238.9/km^{2}). The racial makeup of the village was 98.2% White, 0.2% African American, 0.3% Native American, 0.2% Asian, and 1.0% from two or more races. Hispanic or Latino of any race were 1.0% of the population.

There were 763 households, of which 35.8% had children under the age of 18 living with them, 49.4% were married couples living together, 11.1% had a female householder with no husband present, 5.5% had a male householder with no wife present, and 33.9% were non-families. 27.7% of all households were made up of individuals, and 13.2% had someone living alone who was 65 years of age or older. The average household size was 2.45 and the average family size was 2.98.

The median age in the village was 40.8 years. 24.6% of residents were under the age of 18; 5.6% were between the ages of 18 and 24; 26.3% were from 25 to 44; 22.1% were from 45 to 64; and 21.4% were 65 years of age or older. The gender makeup of the village was 45.0% male and 55.0% female.

=== 2000 census ===
As of the census of 2000, there were 1,913 people, 710 households, and 474 families living in the village. The population density was 1,642.0 people per square mile (631.3/km^{2}). There were 736 housing units at an average density of 631.7 per square mile (242.9/km^{2}). The racial makeup of the village was 98.95% White, 0.16% African American, 0.26% Native American, 0.05% Asian, and 0.58% from two or more races. Hispanic or Latino of any race were 0.42% of the population.

There were 710 households, out of which 32.5% had children under the age of 18 living with them, 54.9% were married couples living together, 8.9% had a female householder with no husband present, and 33.1% were non-families. 26.9% of all households were made up of individuals, and 12.0% had someone living alone who was 65 years of age or older. The average household size was 2.53 and the average family size was 2.99.

In the village, the population was spread out, with 22.4% under the age of 18, 8.5% from 18 to 24, 29.7% from 25 to 44, 16.4% from 45 to 64, and 22.9% who were 65 years of age or older. The median age was 38 years. For every 100 females, there were 81.0 males. For every 100 females age 18 and over, there were 74.1 males.

The median income for a household in the village was $44,740, and the median income for a family was $53,833. Males had a median income of $35,897 versus $22,652 for females. The per capita income for the village was $18,622. About 2.3% of families and 7.8% of the population were below the poverty line, including 1.7% of those under age 18 and 24.9% of those age 65 or over.

== Government ==
The village is run by a board of trustees. At the county level, Campbellsport is represented by Joseph W. Koch. In the Wisconsin State Legislature, the village is represented by Daniel LeMahieu (R-59th District) in the Wisconsin State Assembly, and Duey Stroebel (R-20th District) in the Wisconsin State Senate. At the national level, Campbellsport is represented by Congressman Glenn Grothman (R-WI 6th District), and Senators Ron Johnson (R-WI), and Tammy Baldwin (D-WI).

== Education ==
Campbellsport is served by the Campbellsport School District. The schools serving Campbellsport are Campbellsport Elementary School, Campbellsport Junior High School, and Campbellsport High School.

== Transportation ==
Campbellsport is located on Wisconsin State Highway 67 between U.S. Route 41 and U.S. Route 45.

In 2012, three teenagers were killed in a car crash in Campbellsport. The crash became the subject of a YouTube documentary, part of a teenage driving safety campaign.

== Notable people ==
- L. J. Fellenz, Wisconsin State Senator and lawyer, attended school in Campbellsport.
- Glenn Grothman, Wisconsin State Senator and member of the United States House of Representatives, lived in Campbellsport.
- Ignatius Klotz, Wisconsin politician and farmer, lived in Campbellsport.
- Roman Catholic bishop Salvador Albert Schlaefer Berg was born in Campbellsport.
- Alfred Van De Zande, Wisconsin State Representative, was born in Campbellport.
- H. Albert Wrucke, Wisconsin State Representative and businessman, lived in Campsbellsport.
- Amy Yeary, a previously unidentified murder victim whose remains were found in 2008. She was identified in 2021.

== See also ==
- List of villages in Wisconsin
