= Outpost for Hope =

- Established: 1999
- Headquarters: Sacramento, California, U.S.
- Region served: United States
- Website: outpostforhope.org

Outpost for Hope is a charity based in the United States which specializes in providing resources to families and law enforcement agencies who deal with endangered runaways such as foster children, homeless and transient persons, lost mentally ill persons, addicts and other high-risk missing persons who for various reasons cannot or have not been reported missing.

The charity provides resources, such as guides and visual tools, that describe what to do if a relative or friend goes missing and police or other agencies cannot or will not take a missing persons' report. For agencies, it provides educational studies, resources, and guides in dealing with these cases.

It has been in operation since 1999 and has 501(c)(3) tax-exempt status.

== Mission ==
1. Defining the problem of unreported missing children and adults: the kids off the grid.
2. Supporting the efforts of families in crisis, law enforcement, and affiliated agencies to locate and provide recovery information that saves lives.
3. To educate society about the mis-perceptions of mental illness, drug addiction, and homelessness and their ripple effects. Reducing the stigma about these conditions which create opportunities for people to be lost and for predators to exploit them without anyone noticing.
4. Helping families with tools that allow them to find their missing relatives or friends. It also trains and provides informational material to law enforcement and other agencies which allows these individuals and agencies to deal with the families of Unreported missing persons as well as finding ways to get them officially listed.

== Structure ==
Outpost for Hope is a 501(c) (3) nonprofit online organization based in Sacramento, California serving the United States. It was founded in 1999 by Libba Phillips after her sister went missing and she could not get her listed as missing. It focuses on the location and recovery of unreported missing persons and is defining the problem of unreported missing children and adults: whom they call the "kids off the grid."

The charity is run by volunteers, and is funded by donations from the public and selling of merchandise and guides.

As an online organization, its tools and information are available worldwide, but it is mainly aimed at the United States.

== Unreported missing persons ==
Outpost for Hope calls all unreported missing persons "Kids Off The Grid", a term first coined by Libba Phillips. The term applies whether the missing person is a child or an adult. "Unreported" means the missing person is not part of the National Crime Information Center database of missing persons.

People can become Kids Off The Grid or "unreported missing" for a variety of reasons, including:

- the lost/missing person may be estranged from family or friends.
- law enforcement may not take a "missing" report or will stop investigations if they believe that the person is "voluntarily missing".
- the lost/missing person may be in the country illegally.
- the person may be an unknown dependent child of an unreported missing adult or teen.
- the person might be the victim of an undiscovered crime.

== Social programs ==
=== The Missing Link Registry ===
The Missing Link Registry is a database for families who have not been able to register their missing loved ones in any official lists. The registry aims to gather actual data that can be used as case studies for policy making as well as training of law enforcement and other related agencies and the future development of prevention strategies.

The registry takes data relating to the reasons why the missing person could not be registered with law enforcement. It also keeps a record of the missing persons' state of mind and health at the time of disappearance. Other details contained in their registry form are whether the person had children if they had known drug issues, and whether they were homeless or institutionalized at the time of disappearance.

=== The Perception Project ===
The Perception Project, a collaboration with Let's Bring Them Home, is specifically aimed at young people, students, artists, and writers and asks for creative works which contain or define the word "lost" in them. They believe that the participation and definition of "lost" in this project will shed light on the problem of unreported lost and missing children and adults to a population of people who would not normally have any contact with missing people and in particular Unreported missing or Kids off the Grid.

=== Education ===
The charity provides training and free guides to law enforcement, social workers, educators, health care workers, mental health workers, homeless services, drug and alcohol recovery providers and youth.

== See also ==
- The Doe Network; Outpost For Hope founder Libba Phillips is also Northern California Area Director for The Doe Network.
