= Oak Grove Jane Doe =

Unidentified murder victim found in the Willamette River, Oregon, U.S.

- Victim's clothing and burlap in which the remains were discovered
- Status: Unidentified for 79 years, 10 months and 19 days
- Cause of death: Homicide by blunt-force trauma
- Body discovered: April 12, 1946 – October 13, 1946; Oak Grove and Oregon City, Oregon, U.S.
- Known for: Unidentified decedent
- Height: 5 ft 2 in (1.57 m) – 5 ft 4 in (1.63 m)

Oak Grove Jane Doe is an unidentified murder victim found dismembered in the Willamette River south of Portland, Oregon near Oak Grove over a period of several months in 1946. The first discovery consisted of a woman's torso which was found wrapped in burlap, floating near the Wisdom Light moorage on April 12, 1946; this led the media to dub the case the Wisdom Light Murder.

The arms and one thigh of the victim were discovered the following day, April 13, floating against the lock system of Willamette Falls in similar burlap packaging; both the hands and foot had been severed from the limbs and were missing. In July 1946, the second thigh was found in the Willamette near Oregon City, and additional women's clothing believed to be that of the victim was recovered from the Clackamas River around the same time.

In October 1946, the victim's severed head was found in the river near the location of the original torso discovery; her hands and feet were never recovered. Though initially reported to have been a female in her late teens or twenties, a pathologist from the University of Oregon medical school confirmed the victim was a middle-aged Caucasian woman between 40 and 50 years old.

The case received national media attention, appearing on the front page of numerous news outlets, but her identity and killer remain unknown. In 2004, her murder case was formally reopened, but remains a cold case. In September 2025, the woman's remains were rediscovered and exhumed for advanced forensic analysis.

== Discovery ==
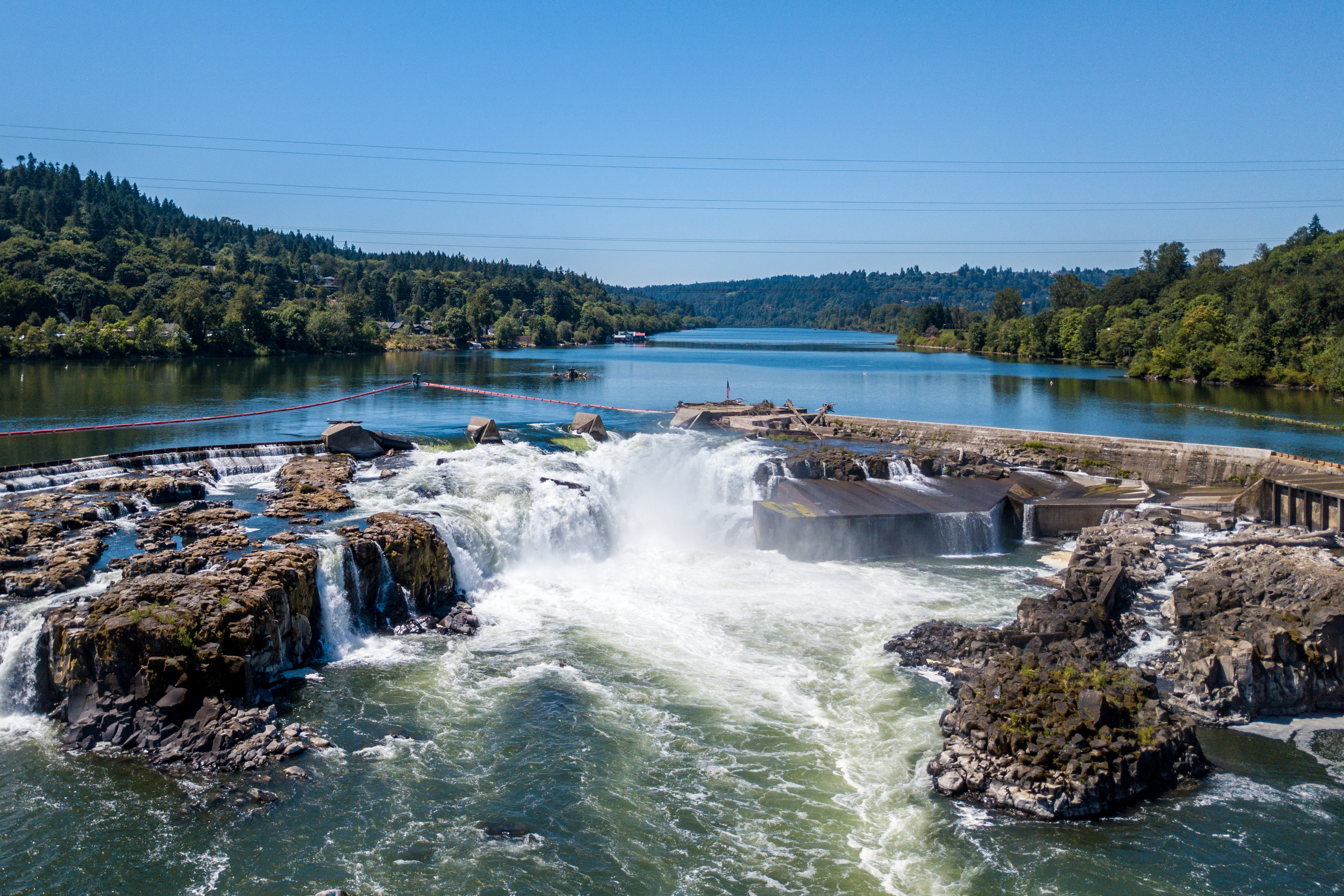
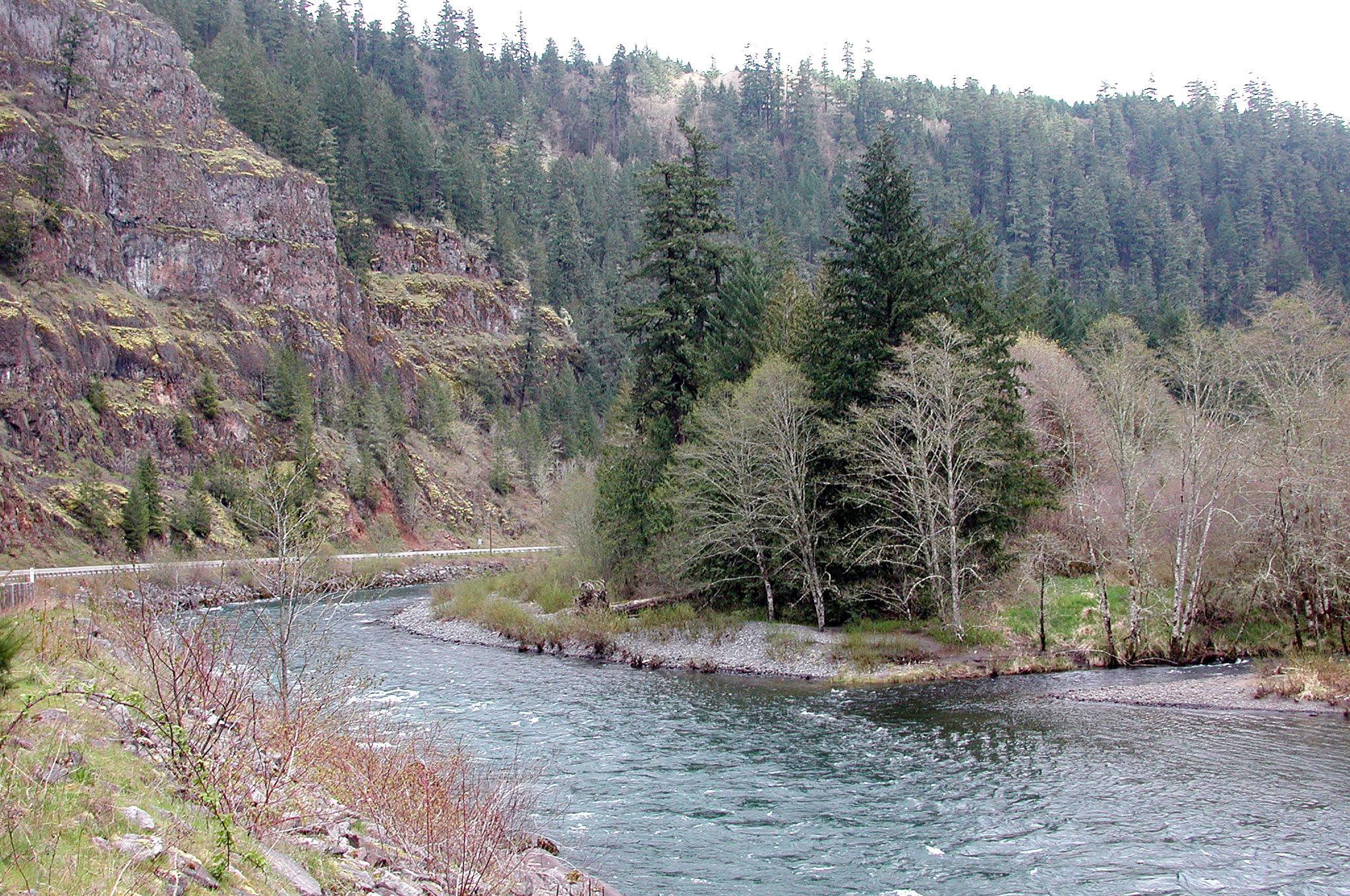
Portions of the victim's body were found floating against the lock system above Willamette Falls (left), while additional clothing was discovered in the Clackamas River (right)

On April 12, 1946, three people walking along the east bank of the Willamette River near Oak Grove, Oregon (immediately south of Dunthorpe, an affluent suburb 9 miles (14 km) south of Portland) discovered a burlap sack floating in an eddy offshore. Inside, they found the torso of a Caucasian female, along with several articles of clothing including an overcoat, long underwear, and a dark sweater. The package had been wound with rope and wire, and also contained window sash weights. Initially, the individuals who found the sack believed it was a "sack of drowned kittens."

The following day, April 13, the woman's right thigh and both arms were discovered in the river in similar burlap packaging, floating above Willamette Falls, approximately 6 miles (9.7 km) from the location where the torso was discovered. Sash weights were also discovered in the package containing the arms and thigh, and it had been wound with telephone wire. The hands had been severed from the arms, and the foot severed from the leg, neither of which could be located. Two fishermen made the discovery, and told authorities they had noticed the burlap package floating in the area at least 30 days prior, but did not immediately find it suspicious. However, after reading of the discovery of the torso downstream, they returned to the area and found the package still floating against the falls' lock system, after which they notified law enforcement. Police searched the area around the falls, and made plaster casts of footprints found in the mud along the bank near where the arms and leg were found.

Three months later, in late July 1946, the victim's left thigh was discovered floating under the Oregon City Bridge near McLoughlin Boulevard. On July 29, 1946, the Albany Democrat-Herald reported that bundles of women's clothing had also been discovered in the Clackamas River, a tributary of the Willamette. This led detectives to suspect that the perpetrator had possibly disposed of the body in both rivers.

In September, "what appeared to be fragments of a human scalp" were discovered near Willamette Falls. The following month, on October 13, 1946, a package containing the woman's severed head was found near the location her torso had been discovered by a married couple from Oak Grove. The hands and feet of the woman were never recovered.

At the time, the murder was referred to by the media as the Wisdom Light Murder, based on the fact that the torso had been discovered near the Wisdom Light moorage.

== Investigation ==
=== Initial findings ===
Victim's lower jawbone and dentures

Ray Rilance, the Clackamas County coroner who first examined the torso, estimated the victim to be in her "teens or early twenties," and weighing around 115 pounds (52 kg). Rilance told the media that the perpetrator had done "rather a neat job—at least he knew where the joints were."

Dr. Warren Hunter, a pathologist from the University of Oregon medical school, subsequently examined the torso, and determined it belonged to a female "past middle age...about 50." Hunter also estimated that the torso had been placed in the water no more than 36 hours prior to its discovery. Prior to the Hunter's analysis, national newspapers had reported the coroner's estimation that the victim was in her "teens or early twenties," resulting in a barrage of phone calls to law enforcement from concerned parents. (Note: Various newspapers, both local and national, reported that the body was that of a younger female; the Hagerstown, Maryland's Daily Mail, for example, reported the body was that of a "slender young woman.") The pathologist concluded the woman was between 5 feet 2 inches (1.57 m) and 5 feet 4 inches (1.63 m) tall, weighed approximately 140 pounds (64 kg) to 150 pounds (68 kg), and had light brown hair. The lower portion of the torso showed burn marks, possibly from a blow torch, leading police to believe the victim had been tortured.

Portland weather bureau official Elmer Fisher stated at the time that the torso could have been placed in the water "anywhere below Oregon City falls [now Willamette Falls]" but could not have drifted upstream from Portland. The day after the torso was discovered, on April 14, 1946, a false confession was made by a man from a telephone booth in Milwaukie; the man claimed to have known the woman's identity, as well as the location where she had been dismembered. Law enforcement however determined the call was a prank, and dismissed any connection to the murder.

On September 9, 1946, it was reported that law enforcement were investigating a possible connection between the remains and Marie Nastos, a 47-year-old woman from Seattle, Washington, who had gone missing on August 24, 1945, en route to Seattle after a trip to Wenatchee. Nastos matched the physical description of the victim, standing at 5 feet 2 inches (1.57 m), weighing approximately 120 pounds (54 kg), and having brown hair.

Upon the discovery of the victim's head in October 1946, it was revealed the woman wore dentures. The cause of death was determined to have been blunt-force trauma to the head. After death, the victim was dismembered—possibly with a saw—and disposed of in the river. Law enforcement at the time investigated a potential connection between the woman and two missing persons cases in California and Indiana, but were unable to make a connection.

In July 1951, agents from the Federal Bureau of Investigation interviewed convicted murderer Roy Moore from his prison cell in North Carolina; he purportedly recounted in detail his murder and dismemberment of a woman whom he claimed to have disposed of in the nearby Molalla River, but provided no information linking him to the Oak Grove Jane Doe.

=== 2004 reopening and further progress ===
In 2004, the case was formally reopened by the Clackamas County Sheriff's Office. In a 2017 interview with Clackamas County Sheriff's Office Sergeant John Krummenacker, it was revealed that evidence in the case—including the location of the woman's clothing, jawbone, dentures, and other remains—were unknown. It is believed the evidence was lost sometime in the 1950s. Krummenacker commented: "The end result is this–there's a middle-aged woman that was brutally murdered with a blunt force trauma blow to her head. Then [she] was sawn up, cut up, dismembered and thrown in this river like a piece of garbage."

In the 2016 book Murder and Scandal in Prohibition Portland: Sex, Vice & Misdeeds in Mayor Baker's Reign it was written that "no new leads" have surfaced in the woman's murder, and "there is little hope of ever being able to solve the case" based on the lack of living witnesses and the loss of remains and other physical documentation.

In September 2025, workers at the Oregon State Police Medical Examiner's Office discovered that the woman had likely been buried under a headstone which reads "UNKNOWN WOMAN 1946" at Mountain View Cemetery in Oregon City, Oregon in 1951, using digital records from the user-generated website Find a Grave. Before this development, her remains were considered to be lost, including her mandible which had been intentionally retained for identification purposes, and a DNA sample was not on file for her. She was exhumed from the cemetery on September 22, 2025, in preparation for modern anthropological and forensic analysis.

== Theories ==
Crime writers J.D. Chandler and Joshua Fisher speculated that the identity of the woman was Anna Schrader, a married Portland woman who allegedly had an affair with William Breunning, a married police lieutenant. In 1929, Schrader and Breunning had a heated argument in which a gun was fired; Breunning stopped Schrader by jumping on top of her, and in turn broke several of her ribs. In April 1946, around the time the body was discovered, The Oregonian ran a notice seeking Anna Schrader, who had disappeared; she had previously told friends she was considering moving to Minnesota, but as of 2017, no public records of residence or her death are known. Local crime writer Theresa Griffin-Kennedy also stated that the Jane Doe's remains matched the physical description of Schrader.

== See also ==
- List of unsolved murders (1900–1979)

== Works cited ==
- Chandler, J.D.; Griffin-Kennedy, Theresa (2016). Murder and Scandal in Prohibition Portland: Sex, Vice & Misdeeds in Mayor Baker's Reign. Stroud, Gloucestershire: The History Press. ISBN 978-1-467-11953-5.
