= Murder of Amy Yeary =

Formerly unidentified homicide victim

Amy Yeary
- Photo of Yeary provided by the Fond du Lac County Sheriff's Office
- Born: Amy Marie Yeary; December 9, 1989; Rockford, Illinois, United States
- Died: c. August 15 or 24, 2008 (aged 18)
- Body discovered: November 23, 2008; Cambellsport, Fond du Lac County, Wisconsin, United States
- Resting place: Cattaraugus Cemetery, Waupun, Wisconsin, United States
- Known for: Formerly unidentified victim of homicide
- Height: Between 4 ft 10 in (1.47 m) and 5 ft 4 in (1.63 m)

Amy Marie Yeary (December 9, 1989 – c. August 15 or 24, 2008) was an American teenager whose body was discovered on November 23, 2008, near Campbellsport, Fond du Lac County, Wisconsin. Her body remained unidentified for 13 years before investigators announced her identification via forensic genealogy and dental records on November 23, 2021.

Her face was reconstructed digitally by the National Center for Missing and Exploited Children in 2009 and again in 2018 to approximate her appearance, as decomposition ruled out visual identification. After the revised rendering was released, her remains were exhumed for additional forensic information. Isotope testing indicated she originated from New Mexico or Arizona and had lived in the Midwestern United States for about a year or less before her death. Genetic genealogy research was also utilized as a way to locate potential relatives.

Before her identification in 2021, Yeary was known as "Fond du Lac County Jane Doe". She is believed to have been a victim of human trafficking.

== Discovery ==
The remains of a young woman were found frozen in a creek by deer hunters on November 23, 2008, in Fond du Lac County, Wisconsin, near an abandoned farm. To extract the body, investigators had to chisel away the ice and scuba divers searched the bottom for evidence. Some articles of clothing were found, including a strapless Zoey Beth brand black-and-pink top with a pink bow, determined to have come from Family Dollar, where it had been available in the spring of 2008. The underclothing that she wore, also from Family Dollar, was shipped only between July 1 and July 15, 2008. The legs of her Angels brand jeans had been rolled up for several turns, and an elastic ponytail holder was found on her wrist.

No socks or shoes were found at the scene. Initially, no jewelry was found, until a penny-sized St. Benedict medal was found by divers. The medal may not have belonged to her, as examiners could not be certain how long it had been in the water. However, some reports state that a bracelet with several pendants on it was also found on her remains. Her hair was a shoulder-length light brown of differing shades, possibly due to having been highlighted. Because items of her clothing were in various sizes, ascertaining her build was problematic; however, it has been determined that she most likely weighed around 120 pounds.

== Examination ==
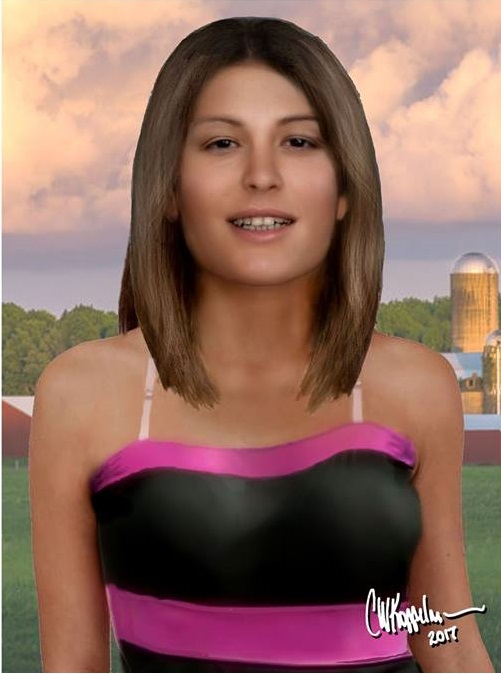
A forensic rendering of then-unidentified Yeary by Carl Koppelman, incorporating the clothing she was found wearing.

Her cause of death was inconclusive, as severe decomposition of the body had removed all signs of possible violence from the remains. However, the manner of death is believed to be homicide, as suicide was eliminated as a possibility. The location where the remains were found had also raised suspicion among authorities. Toxicology tests were conducted to see if any drugs or alcohol had been in her system, but the results were never released.

Although her body was found in autumn, she had died in the summer, two to four months previously. This was established by examining traces from insects that were found on the remains. She had an overbite, and some fillings and dental sealants were found on the upper molars with no current cavities. The overbite was not described as extreme, but may have been noticeable, which could be a reliable feature depicted in her facial reconstruction. Her estimated height was between 4'10" and 5'4", and she was estimated to have been between fifteen and twenty-one years old and weighed between 110 and 135 pounds. Other physical characteristics included a healed rib fracture and being pigeon toed or knock-kneed, which may have been noticeable when she walked, as her feet were slanted inward. She also had spina bifida occulta, but may have been unaware of the condition.

To obtain DNA information, her femur was transported to the University of Texas. Her DNA was entered into the National DNA database and dental records were created that can be compared to those of reported missing persons.

== Investigation ==
Facial reconstructions of Yeary by the National Center for Missing and Exploited Children.

A computer-generated reconstruction was created from the skull by the National Center for Missing and Exploited Children from mortuary photographs and a CT scan of the skull that were submitted to the center. The reconstruction of the victim generated over two hundred tips that did not produce solid leads, as the composite apparently resembled a large number of missing people. Former missing person Amanda Berry, one of several possible identities of the Jane Doe, was ruled out by DNA analysis. She was recovered alive in 2013.

Besides Amanda Berry, two other individuals who were eventually located were also ruled out of the case: Connie McCallister and Brittany Peart. McCallister, native to Wisconsin, was abducted at age 16 and taken to Mexico. She was eventually recovered alive after meeting a "church missionary" who reported the information to the National Center for Missing & Exploited Children. Brittany Peart disappeared in July 2008 from Elkton, Maryland. Peart's remains were located and identified in December 2011. Her cause of death remains unreleased.

Yeary's body was buried in 2011 after the investigation turned cold. Television shows such as America's Most Wanted broadcast the case to possibly reveal new clues. A Facebook page was also created to generate leads for the case.

On April 23, 2018, a revised reconstruction was released and authorities announced that the victim would be exhumed for isotope testing and DNA phenotyping to determine geographical locations where she may have lived and to develop a clearer estimation of her ethnicity and physical characteristics. Genetic genealogy, credited with identifying a suspect in the Golden State Killer case, would also be used to locate individuals biologically related to the victim.

In August 2018, the results of an isotopic analysis performed by Utah's IsoForensics laboratory were released. They indicated that the Jane Doe had likely spent most of her life in the Southwestern United States, possibly in Arizona or New Mexico. She had lived in the Midwest—perhaps in southwestern Wisconsin, northern Iowa, or southern Minnesota—for less than a year preceding her death. Investigators speculated that her case was related to the so-called West Mesa murders, but this was later ruled out.

== Identification ==
Biological samples were sent to Astrea Forensics (Santa Cruz, CA), where a DNA profile was successfully generated for the purposes of investigative genetic genealogy. On November 28, 2021, thirteen years to the date of the discovery of her remains, it was announced that Yeary was positively identified via genetic genealogy conducted by Barbara Rae-Venter. The identification was confirmed with comparison of DNA from her mother, sister, and dental x-rays.

Officials said Yeary was a victim of sex trafficking and would have been 18 years old when she died in 2008. They also learned she spent time in Milwaukee, Chicago, and Beloit in the weeks preceding her death. While speaking with Yeary's mother, detectives learned that Yeary made a phone call to her mother in northern Illinois in 2008 asking for a ride home from Beloit. The mother was unable to accommodate that request at the time. Yeary was never heard from by her family again.

== See also ==
- List of homicides in Wisconsin
- List of solved missing person cases (2000s)
- List of unsolved murders (2000–present)
- Murder of Peggy Johnson, a formerly unidentified woman found in Wisconsin in 1999
- Smurfette Jane Doe, an unidentified teenaged girl who may have been involved in human trafficking
