= Death of Barbara Precht =

Unsolved death in the US

Barbara Precht
- Precht, at about age 46, prior to her 1983 departure from Ohio to California
- Born: Barbara Rose Hess c. 1937; Cincinnati, Ohio, U.S.
- Died: c. November 27, 2006 (aged 69); Ohio
- Cause of death: Drowning (circumstances unknown)
- Body discovered: November 29, 2006; North Bend, Ohio, U.S.
- Other names: "Pearl Lady"
- Known for: Former unidentified decedent
- Spouse: James Precht

Barbara Rose Precht (née Hess), previously known as Pearl Lady, was an American woman who was found dead in the Ohio River in 2006; she remained unidentified until 2014. Precht's cause of death is unknown; it may have been an accident, suicide or homicide. Her husband, James, was located and arrested for lying to police about his identity after she was identified.

== Circumstances ==
Barbara Precht was originally from the wealthy Hess family of Cincinnati, Ohio; her father was the head of the local bar association and her uncle was a judge. She married her husband, school supervisor James Precht, and had two daughters while living in Indian Hill, Ohio.

One of Precht's daughters recalled hearing individuals, presumably intruders, arguing with her parents one night and believed that they possibly were armed. This recollection was later confirmed by James after his arrest. The pair decided to flee to California in 1983, where they lived under aliases. They eventually put their children up for adoption, likely for their protection and so that they would have "better lives".

== Discovery ==
Precht's body was pulled from the Ohio River on November 29, 2006. She was found wearing makeup and jewelry, including two necklaces of pearl-like beads that led to the nickname "Pearl Lady". She also wore a black blouse and skirt, white socks, gray shoes and tan nylon pantyhose. After an autopsy, it was concluded that she had been deceased for approximately two days; no suspicious signs were noted. The then-unidentified woman had suffered from arthritis in various parts of her body and had a fair complexion with hazel eyes. Examiners also discovered that she had very well-maintained teeth, as she had only one dental filling.

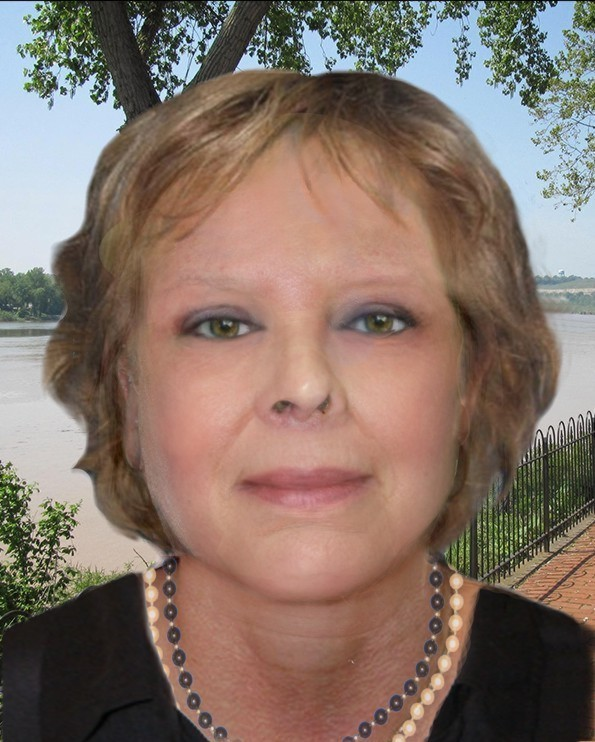
One of many forensic facial reconstructions of Precht created in effort to identify her

Although there were no obvious indications of foul play, the decedent had suffered broken bones, including her ribs, when she had entered the river, indicating that she fell from some sort of height. Investigators published reports and various online databases detailed the case but never uncovered solid leads, which resulted in her identity remaining a mystery, along with many others in the United States. Many amateur sleuths on the Internet expressed possible matches for the decedent, which has generally been a successful way toward identifying the unknown, but did not lead to finding Precht's identity. Other websites, such as The Doe Network, also attempted to assist with the decedent's identification.

== Identification and arrest of James Precht ==
Precht was identified after her fingerprints were compared to those taken years earlier after she had been arrested in 1986 in Covina, California, for shoplifting groceries, during the period when her family were living under assumed names. Her husband, James, aged 79, was arrested when he misinformed police of who he was when they approached him at his home, and had a bond set for $15,000. Although he never reported his wife missing, police say they do not plan to charge him in her death unless more evidence surfaces, as his whereabouts at the time of her death are currently unknown. However, he has been described as a "person of interest". James and his wife had moved back to Ohio shortly before Precht's death for unknown reasons.

James' hearing took place on 2 December 2014 and his trial, lacking a jury, began on 4 December, two days later. During the trial, James pleaded guilty to a charge of disorderly conduct, which reduced consequences to twenty-five days in jail, the majority of which he had spent incarcerated. Prosecutors did, however, request that he be placed on probation, since he remains a person of interest in the case. During sentencing, James was sentenced to an additional four days in jail on top of the twenty-five days in jail.

== See also ==
- List of unsolved deaths
