= Plaquemines Parish John Doe =

Unidentified decedent in Louisiana

- Newspaper covering his burial, alongside with a composite sketch
- Died: February 14, 1975; Belle Chasse, Louisiana, United States
- Cause of death: Suicide by hanging
- Burial place: Gretna, Louisiana, US

Plaquemines Parish John Doe, also known as Belle Chasse John Doe, is the placeholder name for an unidentified teenage male suicide victim found near Belle Chasse, Louisiana on February 14, 1975. The search for his identity received national coverage but to date has been unsuccessful.

== Discovery ==
On February 14, 1975, a couple driving on a farm road between Louisiana Highway 23 and the Mississippi River found the body of an unidentified teenage boy hanging from a persimmon tree near the town of Belle Chasse. He was estimated to have been 16 to 18 years old.

=== Suicide note ===
At the foot of the tree, the teenager left a jar with a lengthy suicide note addressed "to Mom and Dad", which became the subject of media attention. The note reads as follows:

Mom and Dad,

You have provided be [sic] excellent advantages and privileges and experiences. I am extremely grateful for all of your sacrifices, time and support. I am now repaying you with an arrogant act. In this light, I do see it as criminal. I can only hope that you see that it was me who caused it.

I never did develop into a real person and I cannot tolerate the false and empty existence I have created.

It is best if I cease to live, quietly, than risk that later I will break and shatter by violence or linger years under care. I implore you to see a psychiatrist in order that you might understand my death and my life. Ask thoroughly about what I was and you will see that it is not tragic that I am gone but more natural than if I continued.

I was born with a definite pervasive melancholy. What frustrated me most in the last year was that I had built no ties to family or friends. There was nothing of lasting worth and value. I led a detached existence and I was a parody of a person-literally and figuratively. I didn't tell jokes-I was a joke.

I am a bomb of frustration and should never marry or have children. It is safest to defuse the bomb harmlessly now. I do not want to bother with being a "reformed and cured" person limping through life. I am this self-centered.

I am no longer interested in the world and know that it is not interested in me. When you stop growing you are dead. I stopped growing long ago.

The teenager would leave a message for authorities, asking to respect his wishes of not being identified in the future:

You are bound to preserve domestic peace and order. If you pursue who I was (and spend hundreds of dollars) you will accomplish little. There are no legal consequences of my death or any kind of entanglements. All that can happen is that you will shatter the domestic peace and order of two innocent lives. Do not deprive them of the hope that their "missing" son will return. Let me be, let it be as if I wasn't ever here. Simply cremate me as John Doe.

== Aftermath ==
After the Associated Press ran a story, over 300 parents of missing sons contacted the Plaquemines Parish Sheriff's office. However, a four-month effort to identify the body failed. One potential identity was that of 19-year-old Charles Wallace from Tennessee, but his mother traveled to view the body and stated it was not him. (Note: Charles Wallace was identified in September 2025 through genetic genealogy as a body recovered in Lee County, Arkansas, on January 13, 1977.) The teenager was subsequently buried in Gretna, Louisiana and remains unidentified as of 2026.
