= Death of Jason Callahan =

American ex-unidentified 1995 accident victim

Jason Callahan
- Born: Jason Patrick Callahan; April 18, 1976
- Disappeared: June 1, 1995; Myrtle Beach, South Carolina, U.S.
- Died: June 26, 1995 (aged 19); Emporia, Virginia, U.S.
- Cause of death: Blunt-force trauma in a vehicular accident
- Other names: "Grateful Doe," "Jason Doe"
- Known for: Former unidentified decedent
- Parent(s): Marine Callahan and Unknown
- Website: www.facebook.com/GratefulDoe

Jason Patrick Callahan (April 18, 1976 – June 26, 1995), previously known as Grateful Doe and Jason Doe, was an American man who was killed in a car accident on June 26, 1995, in Emporia, Virginia. His body remained nameless until December 9, 2015. Earlier in 2015, photographs of an unknown male surfaced on a Facebook page for the John Doe. DNA testing later confirmed Callahan to be the unidentified man.

== Death ==
Callahan was killed in a vehicle crash, along with the driver, Michael Hager, after the Vanagon in which they were riding crashed into a pair of trees on U.S. Route 58 West around 1:30 PM on June 26, 1995. Neither man was wearing a seat belt, which likely contributed to each of their deaths. Found with Callahan's body were two scalped Grateful Dead tickets, a dollar in quarters, and a yellow Bic lighter. A letter was found, depending on sources either in Callahan's pocket or near the crash site, reading: "Jason, Sorry we had to go, see ya around, call me #914-XXXX. Caroline T. & Caroline O. Bye!!!!". The phone number on the letter lacked an area code and never led to any additional clues. The letter also contained a small drawing that some speculate may be of Jerry Garcia. The tickets were dated June 24, 1995, and June 25, 1995, respectively; the Grateful Dead performed at the Robert F. Kennedy Memorial Stadium in Washington, D.C., on these dates. Authorities were able to trace the tickets to a Pennsylvania man, but the man turned out to be a ticket reseller and could not recall the details of who he sold them to. Neither of the 'Carolines' has ever been identified.

== Physical description ==
Photo showing Jason Callahan's tattoo

Before he was identified, Callahan was estimated to be between the ages of fifteen and twenty-one years old; he had brown eyes with long curly brown or dark blond hair that had been dyed a reddish color. There was a tattoo of a star on his upper-left arm and another possible tattoo, which was faded, on his right arm, both of which appeared to have been amateurishly executed. He was wearing a beaded necklace and his left ear had been pierced but he was not wearing an earring. There was a scar found on his back. He was White, had no apparent dental work as his third molars were visible, and his teeth were fairly well cared for. At the time of the accident, he was wearing a red, tie-dyed Grateful Dead T-shirt, Levi's jeans, white socks and black Fila running shoes.

== Investigation ==
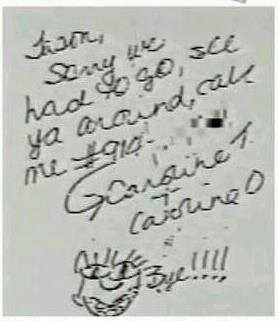
Note written by "Caroline O." and "Caroline T."

The vehicle's driver was identified as Michael E. Hager, 21, who may have picked Callahan up as a hitchhiker. Neither of the decedents had drugs or alcohol in their bodies and there was no discernible external cause for the crash, so authorities hypothesized that Hager could have fallen asleep at the wheel. It has been suggested that Hager may have agreed to transport Callahan because of their similar styles of dress, as they both appeared to be fans of the Grateful Dead. Authorities attempted to identify Callahan through fingerprint analysis with the aid of national databases, but were unsuccessful.

When interviewed, Hager's family could not identify the unknown passenger, who had been reported to have been riding in Hager's Volkswagen Vanagon when he stopped to give his father a letter in Williamsburg, Virginia. However, a detective from the area stated that this claim was not accurate, and that Hager was alone when he stopped to visit his father. It is speculated that Callahan had actually been picked up between Fairfax and Gloucester, Virginia.

Due to the severity of the lacerations on Callahan's face, mortuary photographs were not released to the public, although a facial reconstruction was later released. In 2012, another facial reconstruction was created by the National Center for Missing and Exploited Children. At least 221 missing people were ruled out as possible identities of the victim. Amateur investigators from Reddit and Facebook helped the case.

== 2015 developments ==
Image of Callahan (left) compared to a reconstruction created by the National Center for Missing & Exploited Children

In 2015, photographs surfaced of a young man wearing similar clothes to those worn by the then-unidentified Callahan, and who bore a strong resemblance to the reconstruction images. The person in these photographs was named Jason and was described to have been a fan of the Grateful Dead. He had not been heard from since 1995 and was known to have lived in both Illinois and South Carolina. The man's former roommates and other friends, who also appeared in the photographs, did not recall Jason's last name. The New York Post and BuzzFeed were some of the newspapers that covered the story.

In January 2015, law enforcement conducted a DNA test after Callahan's 63-year-old mother, who had not seen or heard from her son since June 1995 when he left home to "follow the Grateful Dead", officially reported him missing. Callahan, who was identified as the young man in the photographs, is described as having been a white male with wavy blond hair and brown eyes, standing between 5 feet 10 inches (1.78 meters) and 6 feet (1.83 meters) tall, and weighing about 160 pounds (70 kilograms). Callahan, if he was alive, would have been 38 at the time. Callahan was not reported missing by his mother until 2015 because she had thought he had estranged himself from his family.

Lt. Joey Crosby, spokesman for Myrtle Beach police, stated that Callahan's mother failed to file a report with police due to the nomadic nature of Grateful Dead fans. "She attempted to report it when he went missing but didn't know which jurisdiction to report it to," he said. Callahan's family also stated that they presumed he had gone to "live on his own, elsewhere."

After initial tests proved inconclusive, additional DNA testing confirmed that the body was indeed that of Jason Callahan.

== See also ==
- List of solved missing person cases (1950–1969)
- Angela Toler, a formerly unidentified decedent identified in 2012 who died of accidental hypothermia
