= St. Louis Jane Doe =

Unidentified murder victim

Coordinates: 38°39′23″N 90°16′59″W

- The shirt worn by St. Louis Jane Doe at the time of her murder, along with the cord that bound her.
- Born: 1972–1975 (approximate)
- Status: Unidentified for 43 years, 4 months and 19 days
- Died: c. February 23, 1983 (aged 8–11)
- Cause of death: Homicide by strangulation
- Body discovered: February 28, 1983; St. Louis, Missouri, United States
- Resting place: Calvary Cemetery, St. Louis, Missouri, U.S.
- Known for: Unidentified decedent
- Height: 4 ft 10 in (1.47 m) (minimum); 5 ft 4 in (1.63 m) (maximum)

The St. Louis Jane Doe is an unidentified girl who was found murdered in the basement of an abandoned apartment building on February 28, 1983 in St. Louis, Missouri. She has also been nicknamed "Hope", "Precious Hope", and the "Little Jane Doe". The victim was estimated to be between eight and eleven when she was murdered and is believed to have been killed via strangulation. She was raped and decapitated. The brutality of the crime led to national attention.

The victim was initially believed to have been a sex worker or a drug addict until police moved her body and discovered that she had not developed breasts, indicating she had not gone through puberty. The head of the Jane Doe has never been located, hindering dental examination and the possibility of a traditional facial reconstruction.

== Discovery ==
On the afternoon of February 28, 1983, two men looking for a pipe to fix their go-kart entered an abandoned twenty four-unit red brick building at 5635 Clemens Avenue in St. Louis, Missouri (since demolished). Once inside, they discovered the headless body of an African-American child in the home's basement. Her body was naked except for a yellow sweater, and had been left lying on her stomach, with the hands bound behind her back with red and white nylon rope.

The victim was initially believed to have been a sex worker or a drug addict until police moved her body and discovered she had not developed breasts, indicating she had not gone through puberty. Further examination was conducted within the next week.

== Investigation ==
=== Initial findings ===
It was concluded by law enforcement that the victim was not killed at the location where she was discovered, as no traces of blood were found by the body. This led law enforcement to believe blood had been drained from her body elsewhere; her stomach was also empty at the time of her death. The Missouri Botanical Garden performed mold tests on her body which determined she had been killed within five days of her discovery.

The child had been bound at the wrists with a red nylon cord. Her head had been severed cleanly by a large blade, possibly a carving knife. She was between eight and eleven years old and was prepubescent; she had also been raped. She wore only a yellow, long sleeved V-neck sweater and two coats of nail polish on her fingers – one being red and the other purple. Her head has never been found, but fingerprints, footprints and DNA information were successfully collected. There were no distinct marks or deformities on her body. She had been between 4 feet 10 inches (1.47 m) and 5 feet 4 inches (1.63 m) tall in life. Ten months after her discovery, with no new leads for investigators, she was buried at Washington Park Cemetery on December 2, 1983.

The child's sweater had previously been sent by law enforcement to a psychic in Florida who wanted to touch it to receive a psychic impression; however, the sweater was never returned, and is presumed to have been lost in the mail.

Four missing girls have been ruled out as the victim, as well as the Northampton County Jane Doe from North Carolina, who was ruled out to be the remaining parts of the body. She was also presumed to have been a victim of Vernon Brown, who had murdered a young girl in a similar manner. Brown was executed in 2005 and never confessed to murdering the Jane Doe, despite efforts made by investigators.

=== 2013 exhumation ===
Authorities decided to exhume the body in 2013 in order to gather more forensic information about the victim. The remains had been misplaced, along with many other bodies in the Washington Park Cemetery, due to the negligence of cemetery records and were not found until mid June. The remains were located by using camera calibration techniques to determine precisely where a photograph of the casket had been taken on the day of the burial.

Isotope tests on samples of her bones were undertaken to determine the area the victim would have likely lived based on mineral content in her body. According to an article in the St. Louis Post-Dispatch, the test results concluded the girl was likely to have lived her entire life in one of ten southeastern states: Florida, Georgia, Alabama, Mississippi, Louisiana, Arkansas, Texas, Tennessee, or North or South Carolina. However, the National Center for Missing & Exploited Children catalogue entry alternately lists the midwestern–midatlantic states such as Pennsylvania, Ohio, Michigan, Minnesota, Wisconsin, Indiana, or West Virginia.

After the exhumation, the remains were re-interred at Calvary Cemetery in the Garden of Innocents, a section of the cemetery designated for unidentified or abandoned child decedents.

== 2022 documentary ==
A documentary on the case entitled Our Precious Hope Revisited: St. Louis' Little Jane Doe was released in September 2022.

== See also ==
- List of unsolved murders (1980–1999)
- Norfolk headless body - similar case in UK involving an older victim
