= Killing of Anjelica Castillo =

4-year-old American girl killed in 1991

Anjelica Castillo
- Three reconstructions of Castillo created in efforts to identify her body
- Born: Anjelica Castillo; April 24, 1987; Queens, New York, US
- Died: c. July 18, 1991 (aged 4); Astoria, New York, US
- Cause of death: Homicide by asphyxia
- Body discovered: July 23, 1991; Manhattan, New York
- Resting place: St. Raymond's Cemetery, Bronx, New York, United States
- Other name: Baby Hope
- Known for: Murder victim

Anjelica Castillo, previously known for 22 years as Baby Hope, was a four-year-old Mexican-American girl from New York City who was murdered in 1991. Her body was not identified until 2013. The case received national attention due to the young age of the victim and the manner of her death. After her identification, Castillo's paternal cousin, Conrado Juarez (30 years old at the time of her death) confessed to murdering the girl. Juarez died in custody on November 18, 2018, after changing his plea to "not guilty," claiming the confession was coerced.

== Death ==
Castillo's abusive father, Genaro Ramirez, had taken two of his three young children and disappeared; her mother, Margarita Castillo, thought that he had taken Anjelica and her sister and returned to his native Mexico. In reality, he left Anjelica in New York, taking her to stay with the children's adult female cousin, Balvina Juarez-Ramirez, who lived in a house in Astoria, Queens.

Years later, Balvina's brother and Anjelica's cousin Conrado Juarez admitted to torturing, raping, and sodomizing the child before smothering her. Juarez, who was 30 years old at the time of the murder, had bound Anjelica to a table in his sister's apartment, and had deprived her of water on multiple occasions. Juarez claimed he originally did not intend to kill her, but then suffocated her with a pillow after she cried out during her rape. Juarez immediately informed Juarez-Ramirez that their cousin was dead, and his sister insisted that they dispose of the body. Anjelica's body was placed in a cooler, and the siblings took a car service to Manhattan to dump the cooler.

Anjelica's mother, Margarita, thinking Castillo to be in Mexico with her father, and also unable to communicate in English, never reported her missing. Margarita did claim that she and her family had searched for her daughter, but were unable to locate her, for which she became the subject of much criticism and anger when Anjelica was identified in 2013. Other reports reveal that her family also neglected to report her missing because some of the family members, including Margarita, were apparently undocumented immigrants. They feared that if it was discovered that some were in the country without documentation during the course of an investigation, they would be deported.

== Discovery ==
Anjelica's decomposing body was discovered on July 23, 1991, inside a navy blue cooler along the Henry Hudson Parkway in Manhattan, New York. The body was so decomposed that identification was at first impossible, as her face was not recognizable—she soon came to be known as "Baby Hope". She was naked, and had been bound with both rope and a Venetian blind cord. She was placed in a fetal position with her hands pressed together. The body was then wrapped in a garbage bag and placed inside the cooler, which was filled with unopened soda cans and water (which was presumably ice at one time). Examiners concluded that "Baby Hope" was possibly Hispanic, had dark, wavy hair in a ponytail, was malnourished, weighing only 28 lb (13 kg), was a victim of sexual abuse, and had died on or about July 18. She was initially estimated to have been between three and five years of age.

After the examination was completed and with the case remaining unsolved, police officers donated money to have the victim buried after a public funeral was held. A casket was donated in which to bury the little girl, and her headstone was marked as "Baby Hope". One of the officers who was investigating the case gave a eulogy. Two hundred people attended.

== Investigation ==
After the remains were originally discovered, a witness told authorities that she had seen a Hispanic man and woman carrying a cooler in the location where the body was found, prior to the discovery, around the time the girl was estimated to have been murdered. A few months later, in the autumn of 1991, some suggestive images of a nude child were located in New Jersey, which some believed might have been "Baby Hope", as the girl in the photographs matched the victim's description.

"Baby Hope's" body was exhumed in 2006, and again in 2011 to obtain DNA information. Authorities reopened the case in 2013, and requested information from the public. The tip that broke the case came from an anonymous woman who told authorities that she had overheard a conversation two years prior between a mother and another person regarding the disappearance of her daughter. This information led investigators to Margarita Castillo, and DNA comparisons confirmed that she was the mother of "Baby Hope"—who could now be identified as Anjelica Castillo.

=== Identification and arrest of Conrado Juarez ===
"She wasn't missing; her father took them [her children] away and maybe that was my mistake, let him take them away. I did not go to the police because I was afraid of not being heard. I was afraid, not knowing the language."
— Margarita Castillo, mother of the victim

Once investigators had identified Anjelica and her family, further effort led them to the names of her paternal cousins 52-year-old Conrado Juarez and his now deceased sister, Balvina Juarez-Ramirez. Juarez was questioned by detectives after being located working as a dishwasher in a restaurant in Manhattan. The subsequent interrogation led to his arrest for the crime. He was subsequently charged with felony murder. Police stated that they also suspect that Anjelica may not have been Juarez's only victim.

When first interviewed by reporters, Margarita Castillo refused to show her face, and spoke through a closed door. She gave her explanation of why Anjelica was not reported missing, and also described her devastation when she learned of the fate of Anjelica, and her anger toward Juarez. She was subjected to criticism throughout the community for not reporting anything about Anjelica's disappearance.

Some members and friends of Anjelica's family had never known she had even existed. Anjelica's sister, Laurencita Ramirez, spoke to reporters about the case. When she was 11, she learned about Anjelica's existence, and about her abduction by their father years earlier. Ramirez stated that she did not become familiar with "Baby Hope" until the case was reopened and publicized in 2013. When she saw the artist recreations in the media, she saw a resemblance between the victim and herself, and wondered if the still unidentified "Baby Hope" might be the missing sister she had heard about.

When Anjelica was first identified, her father, Genaro Ramirez, was presumed to be involved in her death, until Juarez confessed. To date, Genaro Ramirez has never been located, but is believed to reside in Puebla, Mexico, and may still be unaware of what happened to his daughter after he gave her to Juarez. Juarez later claimed his confession was coerced and told a different account of Castillo's death, claiming his sister asked for assistance after the girl died from falling down the stairs. He later entered a "not guilty" plea when charged with second degree murder. Juarez died in police custody on November 18, 2018, from pancreatic cancer.

== See also ==
- Lists of solved missing person cases
- List of unsolved murders (1980–1999)
- Murder of Atcel Olmedo – Murder of an American toddler
- Unreported missing – Missing person that hasn't been found yet but cannot be reported as missing
