= Murder of Atcel Olmedo =

Murder of an American toddler

Atcel Olmedo
- Forensic reconstruction depicting an approximation of Olmedo when he was alive
- Born: November 5, 2002
- Died: c. September 2005 (aged 2); Naperville, Illinois, United States
- Cause of death: Undetermined, manner considered homicide
- Body discovered: October 8, 2005; Naperville, Illinois, United States
- Resting place: Assumption Cemetery, Wheaton, Illinois
- Other name: DuPage Johnny Doe
- Known for: Murder victim
- Height: 3 ft 0 in (0.91 m) to 3 ft 2 in (0.97 m)

Atcel Olmedo (previously known as DuPage Johnny Doe) was a two-year-old American toddler who was allegedly murdered in 2005 by his mother and stepfather. His body was found in Naperville, Illinois in 2005, but he was not positively identified until 2011. The case received significant national attention and was featured on several television programs. Forensic evidence obtained during the investigation was crucial in identifying him.

Despite the identification, the case remains unresolved. The two main suspects—Olmedo's mother and stepfather—were released on bond and subsequently fled. Authorities believe they escaped to the Mexico City area.

The exact cause of Olmedo's death remains undetermined, but the manner of death is considered a homicide.

== Discovery ==
In October 2005, a small body was discovered in an unincorporated area alongside the Ronald Reagan Memorial Tollway (Interstate 88), between Naperville and Warrenville, Illinois. The remains were wrapped in a blue laundry bag and dressed in a blue button-down collared shirt and matching pants.

Due to exposure to the elements for at least several weeks—possibly up to a year—the body was severely decomposed and unrecognizable.

The DuPage County medical examiner determined that the body belonged to a Hispanic, Native American, or Asian male between three and five years old. The child had black hair, but due to the state of decomposition, his eye color and cause of death could not be determined.

In October 2007, the boy was buried in a donated plot at a local cemetery, following a graveside service. His burial included a teddy bear and a blanket decorated with multiple designs.

== Investigation ==
Two other reconstructions of the victim

The clothing worn by the then-unidentified victim, a brand called Faded Glory, was traced to Walmart, its exclusive retailer. Investigators believed the clothing had been purchased at a Walmart store in Naperville, near the location where the body was discovered. Walmart cooperated with the investigation by providing all purchase records for the specific items of clothing. However, only one transaction remained untraceable as it had been made with cash.

The victim’s footprints were taken and compared against hospital records from the area, but no matches were found. Isotope analysis of the boy's remains suggested that he had lived in Illinois for most, if not all, of his short life. Additionally, the analysis indicated that his mother had spent the majority of her pregnancy in the northern part of the continent.

In 2005, an investigator from the National Center for Missing and Exploited Children (NCMEC) took on the case, designating it as a priority. Evidence was cross-referenced with the cases of at least 12 missing boys from Illinois and other parts of the United States who fit the victim's age and racial profile. Forensic facial reconstructions were performed multiple times in both 2D and 3D, along with digital renderings, to approximate what the boy might have looked like while alive.

To further aid in the search for the boy's identity, the case was featured on television programs such as America's Most Wanted and Without a Trace.

== Life ==
Atcel was born in November 2002 in Mexico. In 2003, he and his five siblings were left in the care of relatives while their mother and stepfather moved to the United States. Sometime later, between 2004 and early 2005, Atcel's mother arranged for him and one of his siblings to join her in the U.S.

In late 2005, Atcel's mother and stepfather returned to Mexico without him. They told his siblings that Atcel had gone to live with his biological father elsewhere in Mexico. However, whenever Atcel's name was mentioned, the siblings were beaten.

The last known sighting of Atcel was reported by the sibling who had also been living in the United States. This sibling recalled seeing a friend of the stepfather driving away with Atcel still sitting in the back seat of the vehicle.

== Identification ==
In 2006, the family entered the United States illegally and settled in Cicero, Illinois. In early 2008, while working on a child abuse case, police began to suspect that "DuPage Johnny Doe" might have been a victim of the same individual involved in their investigation. The oldest sibling urged police to investigate what had happened to her missing brother. She revealed that, in 2006, her stepfather's mother had told her that Atcel had been murdered just a month before his third birthday. It was claimed that his death resulted from abuse inflicted by his mother and stepfather.

Atcel Olmedo was identified through DNA comparison. His sister stated that she believed the facial reconstruction created by the National Center for Missing & Exploited Children was the most accurate of the many that had been made, though she did not have any photographs of her brother for comparison.

The siblings learned through news reports in February 2011 that the remains were identified as Atcel’s. The following day, they visited his previously unmarked grave. His name was subsequently added to the headstone, which also includes the date his remains were found and the inscription: "Son, Unknown, but not forgotten."

== Current status of case ==
The mother declined to answer questions about Atcel, according to a report of her interview on May 6, 2008. The stepfather, who had been arrested more than a dozen times under various aliases from 2000 to 2007 in DuPage and Cook counties, faces up to 15 years in prison if convicted of identity fraud and conspiracy to defraud the United States. Police described him as friendly and cooperative. A few weeks later, both suspects, who have not been officially charged (which is why their names have not been released), disappeared after being released on bond. Officials believe they likely fled to the Mexico City area.

The investigation into Atcel's death remains "ongoing and open" but faces many legal challenges. The U.S. Department of Justice, at DuPage County's request, sought legal assistance from Mexican authorities to locate Atcel's birth certificate and to locate and interview the couple and the stepfather's mother.

An $11,000 reward is being offered for information leading to the arrest of the killers.

== See also ==
- List of homicides in Illinois
- List of solved missing person cases (2000s)
- List of unsolved murders (2000–present)
- Murder of Anjelica Castillo
