= Unidentified decedent =

Term used to describe a corpse of a person whose identity cannot be established

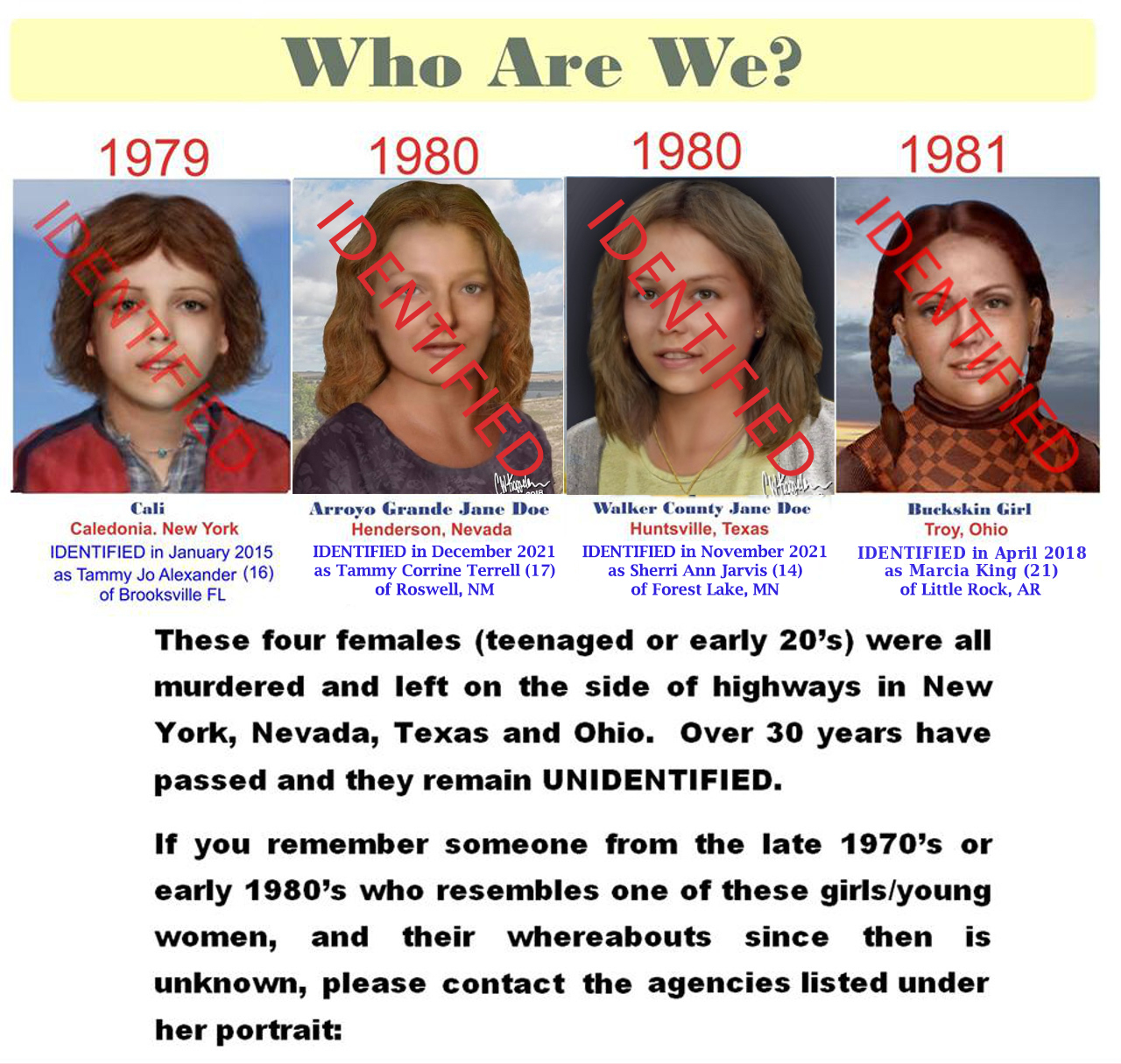
Example of a poster detailing information about four unidentified victims, all of whom have since been identified as: Tammy Alexander, Tammy Terrell, Sherri Jarvis, and Marcia King.

Unidentified decedent, or unidentified person (also abbreviated as UID or UP), is a corpse of a person whose identity cannot be established by police and medical examiners. In many cases, it is several years before the identities of some UIDs are found, while in some cases, they are never identified. A UID may remain unidentified due to lack of evidence as well as absence of personal identification such as a driver's license. Where the remains have deteriorated or been mutilated to the point that the body is not easily recognized, a UID's face may be reconstructed to show what they had looked like before death. In the Anglosphere, UIDs are often referred to by the placeholder names "John Doe" or "Jane Doe".

== Causes ==
There were approximately 14,000 UIDs in the United States as of 2023. A body may go unidentified due to death in a state where the person was unrecorded, in an advanced state of decomposition, or with major facial injuries. In many cases in the United States, teenagers with a history of running away would be removed from missing person files when they would turn 18, thus eliminating potential matches with existing unidentified person listings. In a database maintained by the Ontario Provincial Police, 371 unidentified decedents were found between 1964 and 2015.

=== Location ===
Some UIDs die outside their native state. The Sumter County Does, murdered in South Carolina, were thought to have been Canadian. Both were eventually identified as individuals from Pennsylvania and Minnesota. Barbara Hess Precht died in Ohio in 2006, but was not identified until 2014. She had been living as a transient with her husband in California for decades but returned to her native state of Ohio, where she died of unknown circumstances. In both of these cases, the UIDs were found in a recognizable state and had their fingerprints and dental records taken with ease. It is unknown if the Sumter County Does' DNA was later recovered, since their bodies would require exhumation to recover DNA. Many undocumented immigrants who die in the United States after crossing the border from Mexico remain unidentified.

=== Decomposition ===
Many UIDs are found long after they die and are found to have decomposed severely. This significantly changes their facial features and may prevent identification through fingerprints. Environmental conditions often are a major factor in decomposition, as some UIDs are found months after death with little decomposition if their bodies are placed in cold areas. Some are found in warm areas shortly after death, but hot temperatures and scavenging animals deteriorated the features. In some cases, warm temperatures mummify the corpse, which also distorts its features, though the tissues have survived initial decomposition. One example is the "Persian Princess", who died in the 1990s but, in an act of archaeological forgery, was untruthfully stated in Pakistan to have been over 2,000 years old.

==== Putrefaction ====
Putrefaction often occurs when bacteria decompose the remains and generate gasses inside out, causing the corpse to swell and become discolored. In cases such as the Rogers family, who were murdered in 1989 by Oba Chandler, the bodies were deposited in water but surfaced after gasses in their remains caused them to float to the surface. They were deceased a short period of time but were already severely decomposed and unrecognizable, due to putrefaction that occurred while underwater and high temperatures. It was not until a week later that dental records revealed their identities.

==== Skeletonization ====
Skeletonization occurs when the UID has decayed to the point that bones and possibly only a few tissues are all that is found, usually when death occurred a significant amount of time before discovery. If a skeletonized body is found, fingerprints and toeprints are impossible to recover, unless they have survived the initial decomposition of the remains. Fingerprints are often used to identify the dead and were used widely before DNA comparison was possible. In some cases, partial remains limit the available information. Skeletonized UIDs are often forensically reconstructed if searching dental records and DNA databases is unsuccessful.

=== Burning ===
Often, someone who tries to conceal a body attempts to destroy it or render it unrecognizable. Mario Zunigarobles was killed approximately one hour before he was found, but was completely unrecognizable. When Lynn Breeden, a Canadian model, was murdered and set ablaze in a dumpster, her body was so severely damaged that DNA processing and fingerprint analysis were impossible. She was identified sometime later after her unique dentition matched her dental records, and DNA extracted from her blood at a different scene was matched. Linda Agostini's body was found burned near Albury, Australia in 1934. Her remains were identified ten years later through dental comparison.

== Identification process ==
Usually, bodies are identified by comparing their usually unique DNA, fingerprints and dental characteristics. DNA is considered the most accurate, but was not widely used until the 1990s. It is often obtained through hair follicles, blood, tissue and other biological material. Bodies can also be identified with other physical information, such as illnesses, evidence of surgery, breaks and fractures, and height and weight information. A medical examiner will often be involved with identifying a body. Since 2018, genetic genealogy has also been used to identify many bodies by matching the deceased’s DNA with that of relatives who have uploaded their DNA to genealogy sites.

=== Mortuary photographs ===
Many police departments and medical examiners have made efforts to identify the deceased by placing mortuary photographs of the UID's face online. In some instances, the mortuary photographs would be retouched of wounds if they are to be released to the public. Dismembered corpses may also be digitally altered to appear attached to the body. This is not considered to be the most effective method, as the nature of death often distorts the UID's face. An example of this is that of "Grateful Doe," later identified as Jason Callahan, who was killed in a vehicular crash in 1995. He sustained extreme trauma that disfigured his face.

The body of Berline Trammel was found in a river in Milwaukee, Wisconsin in 1982. She had died months earlier, but was preserved by the cold temperatures. Her morgue photographs were displayed publicly on a medical examiner's website, but her face had been distorted by swelling after absorbing water, with additional decomposition.

Death masks have also been used to assist with identification, which have been stated to be more accurate, as they are required to display "relaxed expressions," which often do not illustrate the faces of the UIDs as they were found, such as that of L'Inconnue de la Seine, a French suicide victim found in the late 1800s. However, a death mask will still depict sunken eyes or other characteristics of a long-term illness, which do not often show how they would have looked in life.

=== Reconstructions ===
When a body is found in an advanced state of decomposition or has died violently, reconstructions are sometimes required to receive assistance from the public, when releasing images of a corpse is considered taboo. Often, those in a recognizable state will often be reconstructed due to the same reason. Faces can be reconstructed with a three-dimensional model or by 2D, which includes sketches or digital reconstructions, similar to facial composites. Sketches have been used in a variety of cases. Forensic artist Karen T. Taylor created her own method during the 1980s, which involved much more precise techniques, such as estimating locations and sizes of the features of a skull. This method has been shown to be fairly successful.

The National Center for Missing and Exploited Children has developed methods to estimate the likenesses of the faces of UIDs whose remains were too deteriorated to create a two-dimensional sketch or reconstruction due to the lack of tissue on the bones. A skull would be placed through a CT scanner and the image would then be manipulated with a software that was intended for architecture design, to add digital layers of tissue based on the UID's age, sex and race.

==== Examples ====
The following gallery depicts various ways UIDs have been reconstructed:

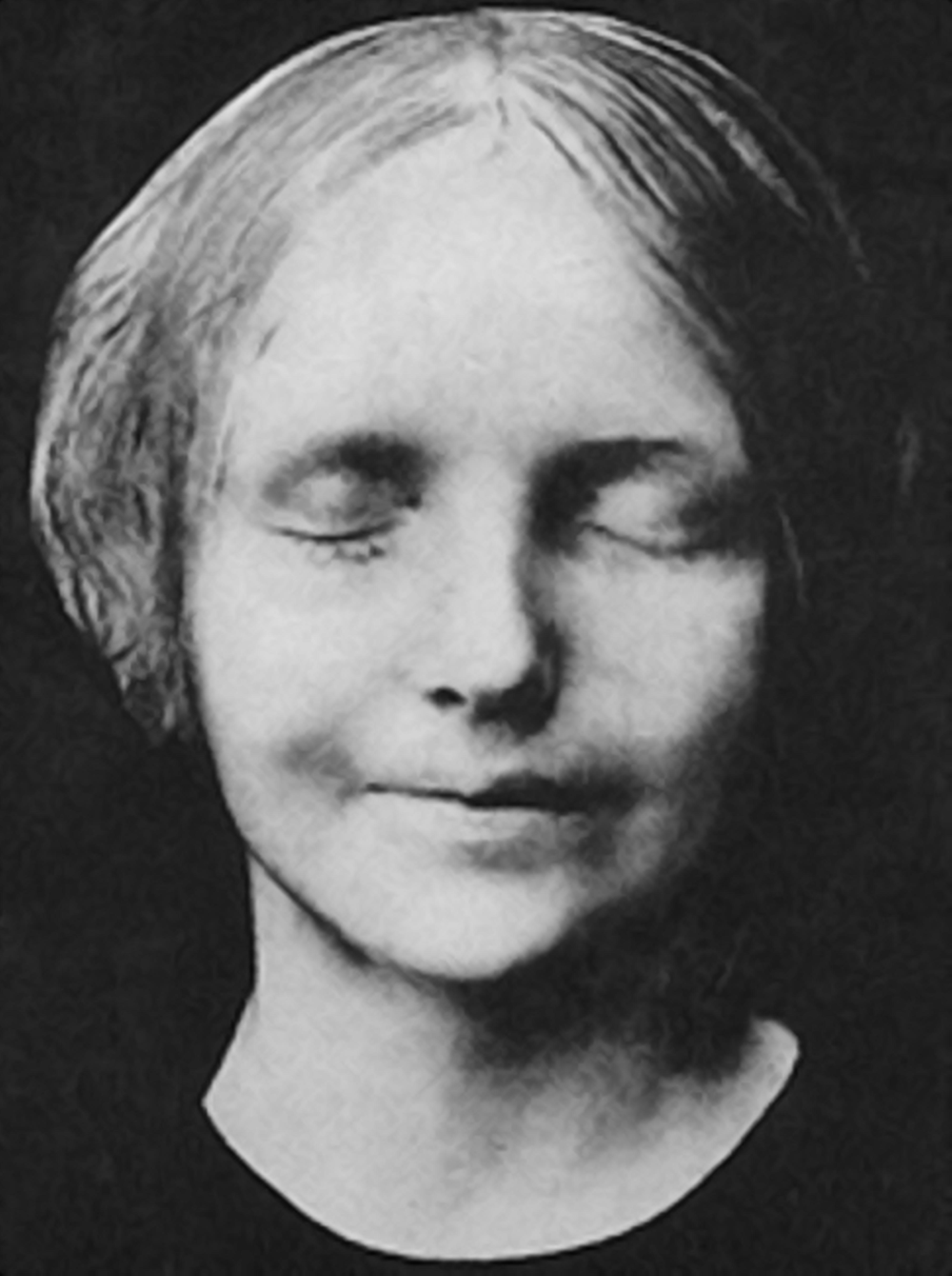
Death mask (L'inconnue de la Seine)

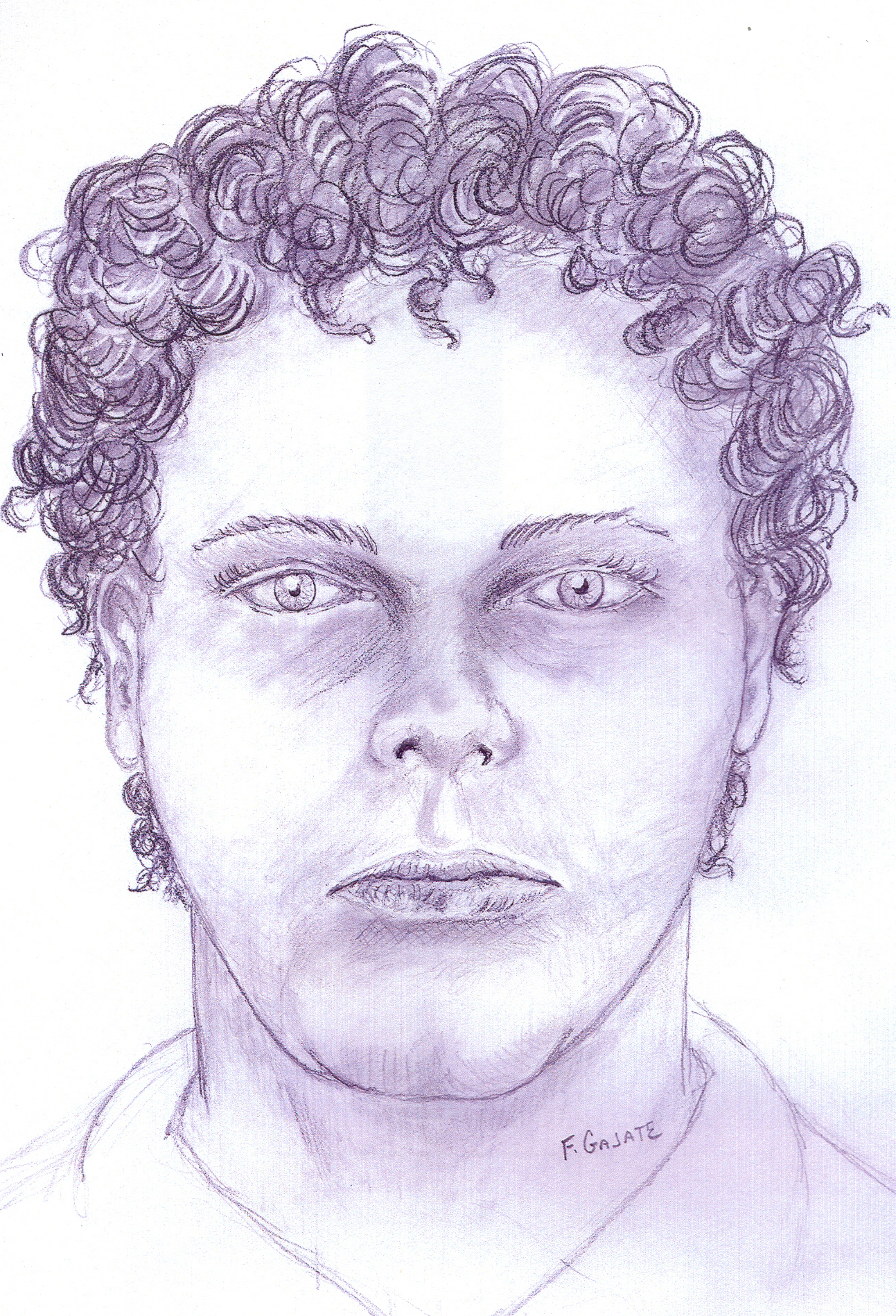
Forensic sketch (Broward County John Doe, 1979)

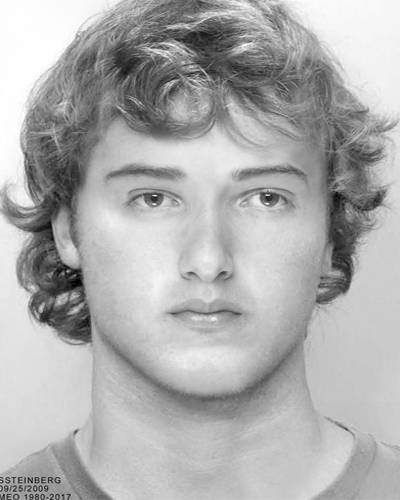
Facial composite (Pinellas County John Doe, 1980)

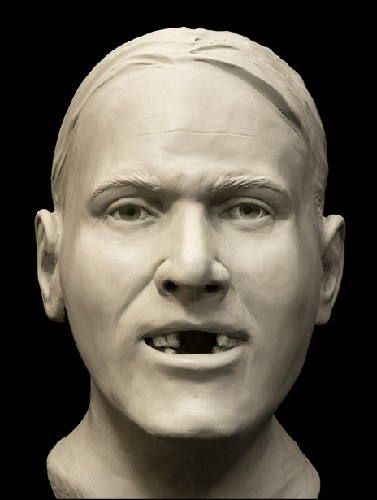
Three-dimensional clay reconstruction (Caroline County John Doe, older decedent)

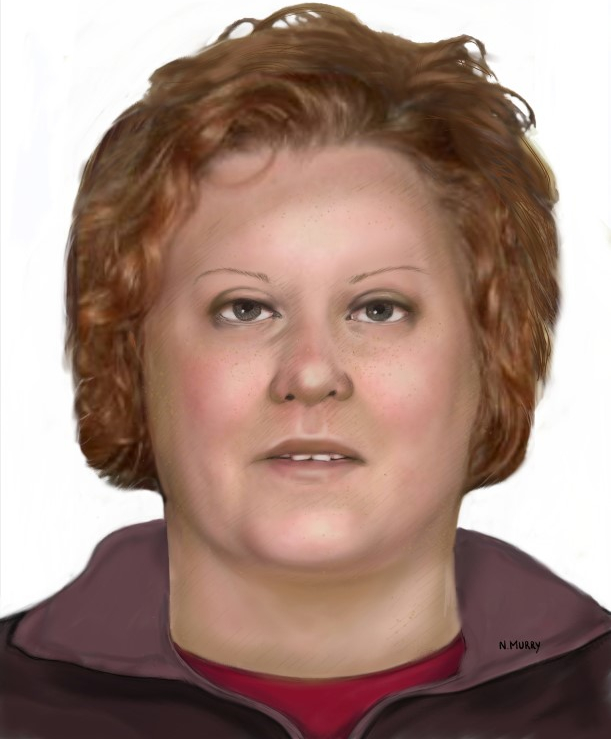
Jane Doe alias “Mary Anderson”

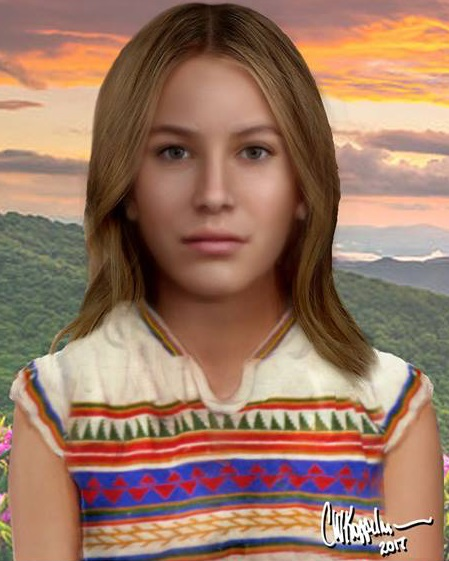
Reconstruction created through a CT scan (Lumberton Jane Doe)

=== Problems ===
In some cases, such as that of Colleen Orsborn, law enforcement had erroneously excluded the true identity of the unidentified person as a possible identity. In Orsborn's case, she had fractured one of the bones in her leg, but a medical examiner who performed the autopsy on her remains was not able to discover evidence of the injury and subsequently excluded her from the case. It was not until 2011 when DNA confirmed Orsborn was indeed the victim found in 1984. In cases such as the Racine County Jane Doe, later identified as Peggy Johnson-Schroeder, the decision to rule out one possible identity has also been subjected to criticism. Aundria Bowman, a teen who disappeared in 1989 who bore a strong resemblance to a body found in 1999, was excluded, according to the National Missing and Unidentified Persons System. On an online forum, known as Websleuths, users disagreed with this ruling before the victim was identified. In the case of Lavender Doe, who was identified as Dana Dodd. A mother of a missing girl also disagreed with the exclusion of her missing daughter through DNA, as she claimed the reconstruction of the victim looked very similar to her daughter.

== Notable cases ==
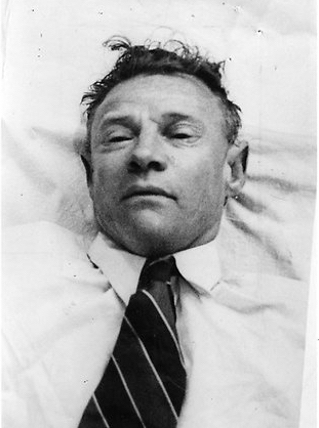
The Somerton Man was found in 1948 in Adelaide, South Australia, and possibly identified in 2022 using DNA analysis.

- Whitehall Mystery, England, unidentified since 1888
- Little Lord Fauntleroy, United States, unidentified since 1921
- Oak Grove Jane Doe, United States, unidentified since 1946
- The Somerton Man, Australia, unidentified since 1948, possibly identified in 2022
- Isdal Woman, Norway, unidentified since 1970
- Fred the Head, United Kingdom, unidentified since 1971
- Long Beach Jane Doe, United States, unidentified since 1974
- Heul Girl, Netherlands, unidentified since 1976
- Eklutna Annie, United States, unidentified since 1980
- St. Louis Jane Doe, United States, unidentified since 1983
- Vernon County Jane Doe, United States, unidentified since 1984
- Nevada City Jane Doe, United States, unidentified since 1984
- Teteringen Girl, The Netherlands, unidentified since 1990
- The Gentleman of Heligoland, Germany, unidentified since 1994
- Jennifer Fairgate, Norway, unidentified since 1995
- Persian Princess, Pakistan, unidentified since 1996
- Mary Anderson, United States, unidentified since 1996
- "Adam", United Kingdom, unidentified since 2001
- Wembley Point Woman, United Kingdom, unidentified since 2004
- Peter Bergmann, Ireland, unidentified since 2009
- Angel of the Meadow, United Kingdom, unidentified since 2010
- Smurfette Jane Doe, United States, unidentified since 2012
- Clocaenog Forest Man, United Kingdom, unidentified since 2015

== See also ==
- List of wheel-well stowaway flights, many of whom do not survive the attempt and have not been identified
- Body identification
- Operation Identify Me
- Tomb of the Unknown Soldier
