= List of solved missing person cases (1970s) =

== 1970 ==
Date	Person(s)	Age	Country of disappearance	Circumstances	Outcome	Time spent missing or unconfirmed
January 18th, 1970	Mared Ellen Malarik	19	United States	Two West Virginia University students last seen alive on January 18, 1970 leaving a theatre in Morgantown, West Virginia. Their decapitated bodies were discovered on April 16 and serial killer Gerard John Schaefer was thought to be responsible.	Murdered	3 months
January 18th, 1970	Karen Lynn Ferrell	18	United States	Two West Virginia University students last seen alive on January 18, 1970 leaving a theatre in Morgantown, West Virginia. Their decapitated bodies were discovered on April 16 and serial killer Gerard John Schaefer was thought to be responsible.	Murdered	3 months
February 24th, 1970	Jacques Vergès	44	France	Vergès, a French-Vietnamese lawyer, left his wife Djamila Bouhired and cut ties with friends and family. He was last seen on February 24, 1970, until he reappeared in 1978 and refused to explain his disappearance or whereabouts. It appeared in December 2017, in a Barbet Schroeder interview, that he was with extremist Palestinian militant Wadie Haddad in Palestine.	Found alive	8 years
February 27th, 1970	Alberto Fuentes Mohr	43	Guatemala	Guatemalan economist, politician and founding member of the Social Democratic Party who served as Minister of Public Finance in the 1960s. He was briefly kidnapped by a FAR rebel on February 27, 1970, but released without harm shortly after.	Found alive	1-2 days
March 8th, 1970	Jacqueline Ansell-Lamb	18	United Kingdom	English secretary who vanished after hitchhiking along the M1 motorway on March 8, 1970. Her body was found days later in woodlands, and detectives believe her murder is linked to that of fellow hitch-hiker Barbara Mayo, who was killed under similar circumstances the same year. It is often reported that the murders were linked by DNA in 1990; however, DNA was only extracted in Mayo's case, and not until 1997.	Murdered	6 days
March 31st, 1970	Susan Blatchford	11	United Kingdom	Two British children who disappeared from Enfield, North London, on the afternoon of 31 March 1970 while playing. Seventy-eight days later their bodies were found in a copse in Sewardstone, Essex. Erroneously thought for nearly 30 years to have possibly died from exposure, causing the murdered children to be called the "Babes in the Wood" in the press, pedophile Ronald Jebson confessed to their rape and murder from prison in 1998, and was convicted in 2000.	Murdered	2 months
March 31st, 1970	Gary Hanlon	12	United Kingdom	Two British children who disappeared from Enfield, North London, on the afternoon of 31 March 1970 while playing. Seventy-eight days later their bodies were found in a copse in Sewardstone, Essex. Erroneously thought for nearly 30 years to have possibly died from exposure, causing the murdered children to be called the "Babes in the Wood" in the press, pedophile Ronald Jebson confessed to their rape and murder from prison in 1998, and was convicted in 2000.	Murdered	2 months
May 29th, 1970	Pedro Eugenio Aramburu	67	Argentina	Argentine army general who served as acting president from 1955 to 1958, Aramburu was kidnapped and later killed by Montoneros terrorist Mario Firmenich. His body was found a month after his disappearance at an abandoned farmhouse in Timote.	Murdered	1 month
June 22nd, 1970	Harvey Crewe	28	New Zealand	Harvey and Jeannette Crewe, a New Zealand farming couple, were reported missing from their bloodstained farmhouse at Pukekawa, Lower Waikato on June 22, 1970, where their unharmed 18-month-old daughter was found in her cot. Jeannette Crewe's body was found, wrapped in a duvet and bound with copper wire, in the Waikato River on August 16, 1970, and her husband's body was retrieved upriver on September 16, 1970. Initial indications from the scene pointed to foul play occurring between June 17 and 22, but not until the bodies were recovered was it established that both were shot to death.	Murdered	3 months
June 22nd, 1970	Jeannette Crewe	30	New Zealand		Murdered	2 months
September 6th, 1970	Donna Lass	25	United States	Lass, a nurse who worked at Sahara Tahoe Casino, disappeared on September 6, 1970, from Stateline, Nevada. Her disappearance has been associated with the Zodiac Killer case despite the lack of evidence. In December 2023, South Lake Tahoe Police Department announced that human remains found in 1986 near California State Route 20 in Placer County was positively identified as Lass. The department did not reveal a reason of death or an indication of foul play.	Died (unknown cause)	53 years
September 25th, 1970	Jeffrey Konen	18	United States	The first of twenty-nine known victims of serial killer Dean Corll. Konen was last seen hitchhiking from the University of Texas to his parents' home on the evening of September 25, 1970. His body was buried at High Island Beach. Corll's accomplice, David Owen Brooks, led police to Konen's body on August 10, 1973.	Murdered	3 years
October 10th, 1970	Pierre Laporte	49	Canada	Laporte, a Canadian politician and deputy premier of Quebec, was kidnapped by members of the terrorist Front de libération du Québec group on October 10, 1970, and held for ransom. A week later, when the government refused the group's demands, they killed him, with Laporte's body found in the trunk of Paul Rose's car.	Murdered	1 week
October 12th, 1970	Barbara Mayo	24	United Kingdom	Mayo was an English schoolteacher who vanished while hitchhiking on the M1 motorway near Catterick, North Yorkshire on October 12, 1970. Days later, her partially clothed body was found in the woods, and was later linked to the murder of Jacqueline Ansell-Lamb committed months prior. It is often wrongly reported that the murders were confirmed to be linked by DNA in 1990; DNA was only ever extracted in Mayo's case, and not until 1997.	Murdered	4 days
November 27th, 1970	Ronald Hughes	35	United States of America	Ronald Hughes was an American attorney who represented Manson family member Leslie Van Houten and disappeared in November 1970 during a camping trip. On March 29, 1971, his body was found by two fishermen in Ventura County wedged between two boulders in a gorge.	Died (undetermined cause)	5 months
December 31st, 1970	Linda Childers	24	United States of America	Childers and Carmichael were fugitives from Louisville, Kentucky who were hiding out with fellow criminals Richard DeFreitas and Donald Brant. DeFreitas and Brant decided to murder the two after Childers told DeFreitas' wife that they all might be arrested if found. Childers' and Carmichael's bodies were discovered in 1974, and while Carmichael's body was identified shortly after, Childers' body was identified 49 years later via forensic genealogy in 2024.	Murdered	53 years
December 31st, 1970	Gustavous Lee Carmichael	24	United States of America	Childers and Carmichael were fugitives from Louisville, Kentucky who were hiding out with fellow criminals Richard DeFreitas and Donald Brant. DeFreitas and Brant decided to murder the two after Childers told DeFreitas' wife that they all might be arrested if found. Childers' and Carmichael's bodies were discovered in 1974, and while Carmichael's body was identified shortly after, Childers' body was identified 49 years later via forensic genealogy in 2024.	Murdered	4 years

== 1971 ==
Date	Person(s)	Age	Country of disappearance	Circumstances	Outcome	Time spent missing or unconfirmed
1971	Shelagh McDonald	24	United Kingdom	Shelagh McDonald, a Scottish folk singer and songwriter, who vanished in 1971. Following the reissue of two of her albums on CD in the mid-2000s, articles were written about her work and disappearance. In 2005, McDonald read one such article and contacted the press to explain that following an LSD trip, which had left her with long-term severe flashbacks and disorientation, she had returned to her family who kept her isolated while she recovered.	Found alive	34 years
January 20th, 1971	Rubens Paiva	42	Brazil	Brazilian civil engineer, politician and congressman for the Chamber of Deputies who was arrested by police on January 20, 1971, for opposing the military dictatorship. He was then tortured and killed, and his body was never located.	Murdered	Never found
April 8th, 1971	Philip Kovolick	63	United States of America	New York mobster and associate of Lepke Buchalter who disappeared on April 8, 1971, in Miami, while expecting extradition to his home state on various charges. His body was later found sealed in a steel drum at the bottom of a rock pit in Hallandale Beach. His killer, John Alvin Baxter, was convicted and sentenced to death for the murder, but it was later reduced to life imprisonment.	Murdered	21 days
April 15th, 1971	Carol Denise Spinks	13	United States of America	Spinks was the first known victim of an unidentified serial killer known as the Freeway Phantom. Spinks was abducted, sexually assaulted and murdered while walking home from a grocery store; her body was found six days later on an embankment behind Southeast Washington, D.C. alongside I-295.	Murdered	6 days
June 17th, 1971	Colette Anise Wilson	13	United States of America	13-year-old Colette Anise Wilson disappeared from the Alvin Bus Stop on County Road 99 and Highway 6 in Alvin, Texas after she was dropped off by her band director on June 17, 1971. Wilson's body was found five months later on November 26, 1971, near the Addicks Reservoir. She had been shot in the head.	Murdered	5 months
July 8th, 1971	Darlenia Denise Johnson	16	United States of America	The second known victim of the Freeway Phantom. Johnson was abducted was abducted while en route to her summer job at a recreation center. Her body was discovered on July 19 just 15 feet (4.6 meters) from where victim Carol Spinks had been discovered two months previously.	Murdered	11 days
July 22nd, 1971	Joyce Margaret LePage	21	United States of America	LePage, a student of Washington State University, was last seen by her friends dropping her off at her on-campus apartment. Her skeletal remains were found wrapped in two blankets and discarded in a ravine south of Pullman, Washington, on April 16, 1972. Serial killer Ted Bundy is considered a suspect in LePage's murder, although he denied any culpability in this case. Her murder remains unsolved.	Murdered	9 months
August 4th, 1971	Rhonda Johnson	13	United States of America	Rhonda Renee Johnson and Sharon Lynn Shaw were two teenage girls who disappeared in Harris County, Texas, on the afternoon of August 4, 1971. In early 1972, their skeletal remains were discovered in and around Clear Lake near Galveston Bay. Local man Michael Lloyd Self was charged with their murders in 1972 and convicted of Shaw's murder in 1975. Controversy arose in 1998 when serial killer Edward Harold Bell confessed to the murders. Bell's confession—and corroborating statements from both law enforcement and prosecutors that Self had been coerced into a false confession—led many to believe that Self had been wrongfully convicted. Self died in prison of cancer in 2000.	Murdered	6 months
August 4th, 1971	Sharon Shaw	14	United States of America		Murdered	6 months
August 23rd, 1971	Melissa Highsmith	2	United States	Highsmith, a 22-month old toddler from Fort Worth, Texas, was kidnapped on August 23, 1971 by the woman hired to babysit her. The case remained unsolved until an anonymous tip led to the family contacting a woman named Melanie Walden, who turned out to be Highsmith. Melissa Highsmith reunited with her family in November, 2022, and reverted to her original name in May, 2023.	Found alive	51 years
October 28th, 1971	Gloria Ann Gonzales	19	United States of America	19-year-old Gloria Ann Gonzales was last seen alive near her apartment in Houston, Texas on October 28, 1971. On November 23, 1971, Gonzales's skeletal remains were found near Addicks Reservoir in the area where the body of 13-year-old Colette Anise Wilson was also found. Gonzales had died from blunt force trauma to the head.	Murdered	3 weeks
November 9th, 1971	Allison Anne Craven	12	United States of America	12-year-old Allison Anne Craven was reported missing by her mother on November 9, 1971, when she returned home to their apartment in Houston, Texas near Interstate 45 after shopping for one hour. Three months later, police found partial remains in a nearby field – two hands, some arm bones, and teeth. On February 25, 1972, the rest of Craven's skeleton was found in a Pearland, Texas field, also near Interstate 45 and ten miles from where she was last seen.	Murdered	3 months
November 29th, 1971	Theo Albrecht	49	West Germany	German entrepreneur who was the founder of the Aldi Nord supermarket chain. In 1971, he was kidnapped by lawyer Heinz-Joachim Ollenburg and Paul Kron, who demanded seven million German marks in exchange for his return. He was later released and his kidnappers arrested, but as a result, the Albrechts became reclusive and avoid publicity.	Found alive	17 days
December 24th, 1971	Wayne Joseph Dukette	30	United States of America	A Sunset Beach bartender and first suspected victim of serial killer Randy Kraft. Dukette's nude and putrefied body was discovered at the bottom of a ravine near the Ortega Highway. His cause of death was undetermined, although his high blood alcohol content indicated alcohol poisoning as likely.	Murdered	15 days

== 1972 ==
Date	Person(s)	Age	Country of disappearance	Circumstances	Outcome	Time spent missing or unconfirmed
January 2nd, 1972	Timothy McCoy	16	United States of America	An American teenager who disappeared in Chicago, Illinois on January 2, 1972, after encountering a man named John Wayne Gacy. A few hours later, in the early hours of January 3, 1972, Gacy stabbed McCoy to death and buried his body in the crawl space of his home. Gacy went on to become a serial killer, murdering, raping and torturing at least 32 more victims between 1974 and 1978. McCoy's corpse was not found for nearly seven years until December 1978, when his body (along with several others) was recovered and conclusively identified via dental records on May 9, 1986, 14 years after his death.	Murdered	14 years
February 11th, 1972	Barbara Ann Derry	18	United States of America	A Vancouver, Washington hitchhiker last seen alive on February 11, 1972. Derry is suspected of being a victim of serial killer Warren Forrest. Her stabbed body was discovered within a gristmill silo in Woodland on March 29 and was identified on April 3.	Murdered	7 weeks
March 21st, 1972	Oberdan Sallustro	56–57	Argentina	Oberdan Sallustro was an Italian-Paraguayan Director General of FIAT Concord in Argentina and entrepreneur who was kidnapped by six people on March 21, 1972 and found dead on April 10, 1972, after being murdered.	Murdered	3 weeks
May 11th, 1972	Michael Blassie	24	South Vietnam	Blassie was an American Air Force officer and pilot from the 8th Special Operations Squadron dispatched to South Vietnam in 1972. During the Battle of An Lộc, his A-37B Dragonfly was shot down, killing him instantly. His remains were found, but could not be identified and were interred at the Tomb of the Unknown Soldier in Arlington National Cemetery. He was finally identified via DNA testing in 1998.	Killed in action	26 years
May 13th, 1972	Barbara Storm	20	West Germany	Barbara Storm was a young German woman from Schüttorf who disappeared on 13 May 1972 was found dead on 17 May 1972 in a forest near Schöppingen after being beaten and strangled. She is believed to have murdered by the "Münsterland Killer".	Murdered	4 days
June 13th, 1972	Kerry May-Hardy	22	United States of America	Abducted while hitchhiking from Capitol Hill, near Seattle in June 1972. Construction workers discovered her skeletal remains buried near a golf course in Roslyn on September 6, 2010. May-Hardy's murder has been linked to serial killer Ted Bundy, although he never confessed to her murder.	Murdered	38 years
July 11th, 1972	Dolores Della Penna	17	United States of America	Dolores Della Penna was a schoolgirl from Philadelphia, Pennsylvania who went missing on July 11, 1972. Her limbs and torso were found in different parts of New Jersey a week later, but her head has never been found. She was allegedly abducted by a gang of drug dealers who accused her of stealing from them.	Murdered	1 week
July 19th, 1972	Steven Kent Sickman	17	United States of America	Steven Kent Sickman was a 17-year-old teenager who was murdered by serial killer Dean Corll on July 19, 1972. He was not identified until 2011.	Murdered	39 years
August 7th, 1972	Jeannette DePalma	16	United States of America	Jeannette DePalma was a girl who disappeared on 7 August 1972, after telling her mother she was going to visit a friend. Her body was discovered on September 19, 1972, and it is believed she was killed some time around August 7 in Springfield Township, New Jersey.	Murdered	1 month, 2 weeks
August 11th, 1972	Leonard Joseph Masar	46	United States of America	A coffee shop proprietor last seen alive at a Rivera Beach bar on 11 August 1972. Masar's body was discovered buried on Hutchinson Island on 3 January 1973. His murder remains unsolved.	Murdered	5 months
September 27th, 1972	Susan Carol Place	17	United States of America	17-year-old Susan Carol Place and 16-year-old Georgia Marie Jessup disappeared on September 27, 1972, after encountering Gerard John Schaefer at an adult education center in Fort Lauderdale, Florida. Place and Jessup told the former's mother that they wanted to go to the beach him. The girls were reported missing after not returning home for four days. On April 1, 1973, their remains were discovered in Port St. Lucie; they were formally identified via dental records on April 5. On May 18, Schaefer was charged with first-degree murder in their deaths. He was found guilty and sentenced to two terms of life imprisonment.	Murdered	6 months
September 27th, 1972	Georgia Marie Jessup	16	United States of America		Murdered	6 months
October, 1972	Seamus Wright	25	Northern Ireland	Wright and McKee were Belfast-based members of the Provisional IRA suspected of being informants for the British Army’s Military Reaction Force; they were executed and secretly buried in County Meath. Their remains were discovered in June 2015.	Murdered	43 years
October, 1972	Kevin McKee	17	Northern Ireland	Wright and McKee were Belfast-based members of the Provisional IRA suspected of being informants for the British Army’s Military Reaction Force; they were executed and secretly buried in County Meath. Their remains were discovered in June 2015.	Murdered	43 years
October 26th, 1972	Mary Alice Briscolina	14	United States of America	14-year-old Mary Alice Briscolina and 13-year-old Elsie Lina Farmer both disappeared while hitchhiking to a Commercial Boulevard restaurant from a Lauderdale-by-the-Sea motel in Florida on October 26, 1972. Their bodies were discovered separately in undergrowth close to Sunrise Boulevard in January and February of the following year. Both girls had been bludgeoned to death and likely raped. They may have been victims of Gerard John Schaefer, a serial killer active in Florida.	Murdered	3 months
October 26th, 1972	Elsie Lina Farmer	13	United States of America	14-year-old Mary Alice Briscolina and 13-year-old Elsie Lina Farmer both disappeared while hitchhiking to a Commercial Boulevard restaurant from a Lauderdale-by-the-Sea motel in Florida on October 26, 1972. Their bodies were discovered separately in undergrowth close to Sunrise Boulevard in January and February of the following year. Both girls had been bludgeoned to death and likely raped. They may have been victims of Gerard John Schaefer, a serial killer active in Florida.	Murdered	4 months
December 4th, 1972	Steven Stayner	7	United States of America	Steven Stayner was abducted from the Central California city and county of Merced, California on December 4, 1972, by a man named Kenneth Parnell. He escaped on March 1, 1980, with Timothy White who was also abducted by Parnell.	Found alive	7 years
December 23rd, 1972	Suzanne Gale Poole	15	United States of America	A Florida teenager reported missing by her family shortly before Christmas 1972. Her partial skeletal remains were discovered on June 16, 1974. She had been bound to a mangrove tree in a swampland district of Singer Island. Poole's body was identified in May 2022 via genetic genealogy.	Murdered	49 years

== 1973 ==
Date	Person(s)	Age	Country of disappearance	Circumstances	Outcome	Time spent missing or unconfirmed
January 1st, 1973	Roseann Quinn	28	United States	Roseann Quinn, a 28-year-old schoolteacher was reported missing after she was stabbed to death in her New York apartment on New Year's Day 1973. Her body was found on January 3 by another teacher. The building superintendent. John Wayne Wilson, whom Quinn had brought to her apartment and smoked marijuana with, was arrested in connection with her death; he later died via suicide by hanging.	Murdered	2 days
January 11th, 1973	Collette Marie Goodenough	19	United States	Goodenough and Wilcox disappeared while hitchhiking from Sioux City, Iowa, to Florida. Their bound bodies were discovered along a canal bank in St. Lucie County in January 1977 and were formally identified the following year. Both are believed to have been murdered by serial killer Gerard John Schaefer.	Murdered	7 years
January 11th, 1973	Barbara Ann Wilcox	19	United States	Goodenough and Wilcox disappeared while hitchhiking from Sioux City, Iowa, to Florida. Their bound bodies were discovered along a canal bank in St. Lucie County in January 1977 and were formally identified the following year. Both are believed to have been murdered by serial killer Gerard John Schaefer.	Murdered	7 years
January 11th, 1973	Paul Martin Andrews	14	United States of America	Andrews was kidnapped from his family home in Portsmouth, Virginia on January 11, 1973, by pedophile Richard Ausley, who stuffed him in a wooden box and only brought him out to assault him. On the eighth day, Ausley left Andrews unattended, giving him enough time to call for help, drawing the attention of two hunters who rescued him. Ausley later turned himself in and was sentenced to 48 years' imprisonment, while Andrews later became an advocate for rape survivors.	Found alive	8 days
January 14th, 1973	Norman Lamar Prater	16	United States	Norman Lamar Prater disappeared on January 14, 1973. He was suspected to have been a victim of serial killer Dean Corll but was actually confirmed to have died in an unrelated hit-and-run incident in Aransas County, Texas in July 1973.	Died (car accident)	7 months
1973	Malika Oufkir	20	Morocco	Daughter of General Mohamed Oufkir who was detained along with most of her family under arrest from 1973 to 1991, due to her father's actions against the monarchy of Morocco in the 1972 coup d'état attempt. A few years after her release, she emigrated to France and became a writer.	Found alive	18 years
January 27th, 1973	Dawn Magyar	20	United States of America	Dawn Magyar was abducted while she was grocery shopping in Owosso, Michigan in Shiawassee County on January 27, 1973, and her body was discovered in a wooded area in Saginaw County, Michigan on March 4, 1973. The case was resolved 28 years after her body was found when a DNA match was made of her killer.	Murdered	2 months
February 1st, 1973	Joseph Allen Lyles	17	United States of America	Lyles was abducted and murdered by serial killer Dean Corll on February 1, 1973. His body was buried on a stretch of beach in Jefferson County, Texas, and were discovered in 1983. Lyles's body was identified in November 2009, although as several bones were never recovered, his actual cause of death was never established.	Murdered	36 years
February 13th, 1973	Leslie Marie Perlov	21	United States of America	21-year-old Leslie Marie Perlov, a Stanford University graduate and law firm employee went missing on February 13, 1973 and was found was dead on February 16, 1973 along the Stanford Dish hiking trail. On November 20, 2018, serial killer John Getreu was arrested for the murder.	Murdered	3 days
April 20th, 1973	Lynda Gough	19	United Kingdom	Gloucester woman who disappeared in April 1973. She had been a lodger of a couple called Fred and Rose West. Following her disappearance, Gough's mother travelled to the home of the Wests to enquire as to her daughter's whereabouts, only to find Rose wearing her daughter's clothes and slippers. In 1994, Gough's body was found buried at the home during investigations into the disappearance of the couple's daughter. Fred and Rose West were found to have murdered 12 young women between them and buried most at the home.	Murdered	21 years
May 23rd, 1973	Sheri Jan Clark	14	United States	Two schoolgirls abducted from Folly Beach, South Carolina, by serial killer Richard Valenti. Clark and Latimer were abducted at gunpoint and forced into an abandoned shower house, where both were hanged from shower pipes. Their bodies were discovered the following year.	Murdered	1 year
May 23rd, 1973	Alexis Ann Latimer	13	United States	Two schoolgirls abducted from Folly Beach, South Carolina, by serial killer Richard Valenti. Clark and Latimer were abducted at gunpoint and forced into an abandoned shower house, where both were hanged from shower pipes. Their bodies were discovered the following year.	Murdered	1 year
July 10th, 1973	John Paul Getty III	16	Italy	A grandson of American oil tycoon J. Paul Getty. Getty was kidnapped within the Piazza Farnese in July 1973 in Rome and held captive for five months. A $17 million ransom was demanded for his safe release. When Getty's grandfather refused to pay this sum (stating his fear that it would make all 13 of his grandchildren into kidnapping targets), his captors severed one ear, which they posted to a local newspaper. Following a $2.2 million ransom payment, Getty was released by his captors in December. He later suffered from drug- and alcohol-related issues caused in part by the trauma of his ordeal; becoming a partially blind quadriplegic by 1981. He died in 2011.	Found alive	5 months
August 1st, 1973	Peter Wilson	21	United Kingdom	Peter Wilson was an Irish man who was abducted on August 1, 1973, and killed by the Provisional Irish Republican Army. After receiving reliable information his remains were found on November 2, 2010, buried at a beach in Waterfoot, County Antrim.	Murdered	37 years
August 6th, 1973	Marlies Hemmers	18	West Germany	Marlies Hemmers was a female German high school student who disappeared in from Nordhorn, Hemmers on 6 August 1973 and her remains were found on 22 December 1973 across from a horse breeding ground in a small wood. Since her body had decayed it could not be determined what her death cause was. It is believed though that she may have been murdered by the "Münsterland Killer".	Died (unknown cause)	5 months
August 8th, 1973	Kim Dae-jung	49	Japan	South Korean dissident leader who was kidnapped by the KCIA on August 8, 1973, during a conference in Tokyo, Japan. Dae-jung was drugged and moved from Japan to South Korea, but was eventually rescued by the Japanese authorities.	Found alive	5 days
September 2nd, 1973	Brian McDermott	10	United Kingdom	Young Northern Irish child who disappeared from Belfast on 2 September 1973. His body was found a week after he went missing in a sack in the River Lagan. His murder remains unsolved but his brother is the prime suspect in the case.	Murdered	1 week
September 11th, 1973	Svante Grände	26	Chile	Swedish aid worker who disappeared in Southern Chile following the 1973 Chilean coup d'état. He later resurfaced in Argentina, as part of a guerilla group fighting against the regime of Augusto Pinochet.	Found alive	Unknown
October 31st, 1973	Lisa Ann French	9	United States of America	French, a 9-year-old girl from Fond du Lac, was Kidnapped, sexually assaulted and ultimately murdered by her neighbor, Gerald Miles Turner Jr., while out trick-or-treating on Halloween. French's body was later found stuffed in a garbage bag in a field near Taycheedah, Wisconsin.	Murdered	4 days
November 10th, 1973	Carol Ann Cooper	15	United Kingdom	Cooper was a child that was staying at a Worcester children's home. On 10 November 1973, she was allowed to travel to visit her grandmother but disappeared after boarding a bus back to the home. Extensive police enquiries failed to locate her. In 1994, her body was found in the cellar of notorious serial killers Fred and Rose West. She had been abducted by them during her journey and murdered.	Murdered	21 years
December 25th, 1973	Maurício Grabois	61	Brazil	Brazilian politician and founder of the Communist Party of Brazil who later started recruiting guerilla fighters to fight against the government. According to military reports, he was killed in Tocantins on December 25, 1973, but his body was never recovered.	Murdered	Never found
December 27th, 1973	Thomas Niedermayer	45	United Kingdom	German industrialist and managing director of a Grundig factory in Belfast, Northern Ireland who was kidnapped and subsequently killed by the Provisional IRA on December 27, 1973. His body was located by the Royal Ulster Constabulary in March 1980.	Murdered	7 years
December 27th, 1973	Lucy Partington	21	United Kingdom	21-year-old University of Exeter student Lucy Partington, cousin of writer Martin Amis, disappeared from a bus stop on the night of December 27, 1973. At 9am on March 6, 1994, her remains were found buried under the cellar at 25 Cromwell Street Gloucester, the home of notorious serial killers Fred and Rose West. It is believed she was tortured, sexually abused and murdered around January 2, 1974, as Fred West checked himself into Gloucester Hospital with a serious wound to his right hand that needed several stitches at 12.25 am the next day that was probably received while he dismembered her body. Seventy-two of her bones had been removed by West.	Murdered	20 years

== 1974 ==
Date	Person(s)	Age	Country of disappearance	Circumstances	Outcome	Time spent missing or unconfirmed
February 1st, 1974	Lynda Ann Healy	21	United States of America	Healy was a victim of serial killer Ted Bundy. Bundy beat her unconscious, then dressed her in her blue jeans, a white blouse, and boots before kidnapping her. She was then decapitated and dismembered post-mortem and her mandible was recovered from the Taylor Mountain, Washington, site in 1975 and was matched through dental records.	Murdered	1 year, 2 months
February 12th, 1974	Hernán Valdés	40	Chile	Hernán Valdés was a Chilean writer kidnapped by civilian agents in a case of mistaken identity following Augusto Pinochet's coup d'état in February 1974. After spending more than a month in prison, where he was tortured by the guards, he was released and fled to Europe, where he later wrote a book on the Chilean dictatorship.	Found alive	1 month
February 17th, 1974	Carla Walker	17	United States of America	Walker, a high school student, was kidnapped from her boyfriend's car in Fort Worth on February 17, 1974. Her body, showing signs of rape, torture and strangulation, was found in a drainage ditch three days later. Her killer, Glen Samuel McCurley, was identified via DNA in 2020 and sentenced to life imprisonment.	Murdered	3 days
April 16th, 1974	Therese Siegenthaler	21	United Kingdom	Siegenthaler disappeared while hitchhiking from London to Ireland during Easter 1974. A police investigation that lasted a number of years failed to find her. In 1994 her body was found in the Gloucester home of serial killers Fred and Rose West. They had abducted and murdered her, along with 11 other women.	Murdered	20 years
March 12th, 1974	Donna Gail Manson	19	United States of America	Victim of serial killer Ted Bundy. Manson was abducted while she was walking to a concert at Evergreen State College and her body was left (according to Bundy) at Taylor Mountain site and she was never found.	Murdered	15 years
April 17th, 1974	Susan Elaine Rancourt	18	United States of America	Victim of serial killer Ted Bundy. Rancourt disappeared after attending an evening advisors' meeting at Central Washington State College; her skull and mandible were recovered at the Taylor Mountain site in 1975.	Murdered	1 year
May 9th, 1974	Quek Lee Eng	53	Singapore	On 9 May 1974, 53-year-old Quek Lee Eng mysteriously disappeared after she last departed her home to go to her sister-in-law's house, and she was reported missing by her family. Two days later, a severed pair of legs belonging to Quek were discovered at a disused toilet in a mosque at Aljunied, and the police arrested 44-year-old Sim Joo Keow, Quek's sister-in-law who was the last person together with Quek before she went missing. Sim later confessed that she strangled Quek after they argued over a S$2,000 debt which Sim owed to Quek. Quek's upper and lower torso were both found hidden in the earthen jars placed in Sim's house, and a parcel containing Quek's severed head and arms was also found alongside Kallang River. Originally charged with murder, Sim pleaded guilty to a reduced charge of manslaughter and concealing evidence, and sentenced to ten years in jail on 27 January 1975.	Murdered	2 days
May 31st, 1974	Gloria Nadine Knutson	19	United States of America	A student who disappeared while walking home from a Vancouver, Washington nightclub on May 31, 1974. Her body was discovered close to Lacamas Lake in May 1978. She is strongly believed to have been murdered by suspected serial killer Warren Forrest.	Murdered	4 years
June, 1974	John Hely-Hutchinson, 7th Earl of Donoughmore	71	Ireland	Lord Donoughmore was a former Member of Parliament (MP). He and his wife were kidnapped from Knocklofty House, Clonmel in the Republic of Ireland in June 1974 by the IRA. The objective behind their kidnapping was to add pressure on both the British and Irish Governments to address the demands of IRA prisoners on hunger strike in British prisons. Both were held captive for five days before being released unharmed by their captors.	Found alive	5 days
June 25th, 1974	David Kraiselburd	62	Argentina	Argentine journalist who condemned the actions of both right and left-wing paramilitary organizations during the Dirty War in 1974. On June 25, 1974, he was kidnapped by the Montoneros, a left-wing paramilitary organization, and later killed by them when police raided their hideout.	Murdered	3 weeks
July, 1974	Ruth Marie Terry	37	United States of America	On July 26, 1974, the decomposing body of a woman was found by a 12-year-old girl in Provincetown, Massachusetts. The woman, who is believed to have died from a blow to the head, was missing both hands, a forearm, and several teeth. The body was exhumed in 1980, 2000, and 2013 in unsuccessful efforts to identify the woman. On October 31, 2022, the FBI announced the identification of the decedent as 37-year-old Ruth Marie Terry, who had been reported missing by her husband in the summer of 1974. Terry's murder case was closed after her husband, Guy Muldavin, was determined to be her killer.	Murdered	48 years
July 14th, 1974	Denise Marie Naslund	19	United States of America	Victim of serial killer Ted Bundy. Naslund was abducted four hours after Ott from Lake Sammamish State Park in Issaquah; her skeletal remains were recovered at the Issaquah site in 1974.	Murdered	2 months
August 4th, 1974	Carol Platt Valenzuela	20	United States of America	Carol Platt Valenzuela disappeared on August 4, 1974, during a hitchhiking journey from Camas, Washington to Vancouver, Canada. A hunter found her skeletal remains in the Dole Valley, Washington, on October 12, 1974. Valenzuela's remains were located in close proximity to Martha Morrison, a victim of suspected serial killer Warren Forrest, but Forrest has yet to be convicted of Valenzuela's murder.	Died (unknown cause)	2 months, 1 week
August 24th, 1974	Inshirah Moussa	36–37	Egypt	Moussa and her partner, Ibrahim Shaheen, were an Egyptian couple who, from June 1967, worked for the Israeli intelligence service Mossad. Both were arrested by Egyptian Intelligence Services in August 1974; each was tried and sentenced to death by hanging. Shaheen was executed in 1977, whereas Moussa was pardoned following an appeal to Anwar Sadat by Israeli authorities the same year. Moussa subsequently disappeared and then relocated to Israel with her three children. She later converted to Judaism.	Found alive	3 years
September 1st, 1974	Linda Pagano	17	United States of America	Pagano was a teenager who disappeared from Akron, Ohio on September 1, 1974, following a fight with her stepfather, Byron Claflin, the previous night. Initially, law enforcement thought Pagano had run away. On February 5, 1975, an unidentified partial skeleton was found in Strongsville, Ohio. The skeleton belonged to a young white female, and the cause of death had been a gunshot to the head. The case was never connected with Pagano, and due to a clerical error, the unidentified body was never added to NamUs or other databases of unidentified. In 2016, the skeleton was rediscovered by an amateur genealogist looking through records of the cemetery where the young woman was buried. In 2018, forensic DNA analysis confirmed the remains found in 1975 as belonging to Pagano. The key suspect in her case has since died.	Murdered	44 years
September 1st, 1974	Richard Cowden	28	United States of America	On September 1, 1974, the Cowden family mysteriously vanished from a campground in Copper, Oregon. Their bodies were found near Carberry Creek by a pair of prospectors. Their autopsies showed Belinda and David had been shot in the head, Melissa had died of severe head trauma, but Richard's cause of death could not be determined. Convicted murderer Dwaine Little is the prime suspect in the murders, but has never been charged.	Murdered	7 months
September 1st, 1974	Belinda June Cowden	22	United States of America	On September 1, 1974, the Cowden family mysteriously vanished from a campground in Copper, Oregon. Their bodies were found near Carberry Creek by a pair of prospectors. Their autopsies showed Belinda and David had been shot in the head, Melissa had died of severe head trauma, but Richard's cause of death could not be determined. Convicted murderer Dwaine Little is the prime suspect in the murders, but has never been charged.	Murdered	7 months
September 1st, 1974	David James Phillips	5	United States of America	On September 1, 1974, the Cowden family mysteriously vanished from a campground in Copper, Oregon. Their bodies were found near Carberry Creek by a pair of prospectors. Their autopsies showed Belinda and David had been shot in the head, Melissa had died of severe head trauma, but Richard's cause of death could not be determined. Convicted murderer Dwaine Little is the prime suspect in the murders, but has never been charged.	Murdered	7 months
September 1st, 1974	Melissa Dawn Cowden	5 months	United States of America	On September 1, 1974, the Cowden family mysteriously vanished from a campground in Copper, Oregon. Their bodies were found near Carberry Creek by a pair of prospectors. Their autopsies showed Belinda and David had been shot in the head, Melissa had died of severe head trauma, but Richard's cause of death could not be determined. Convicted murderer Dwaine Little is the prime suspect in the murders, but has never been charged.	Murdered	7 months
September 1st, 1974	Martha Morrison	17	United States of America	Martha Morrison disappeared some time in September 1974. On October 12, 1974, the remains of two women were found in Dole Valley near Vancouver, Washington. One victim was quickly identified as Carol Platt Valenzuela, who had been reported missing, but the other set remained unidentified. In 2015 Martha Morrison's remains were identified by means of DNA profiling after they were found to have been mislabeled by the police as Carol Platt Valenzuela.	Murdered	40 years
September 6th, 1974	Brooks Bracewell	12	United States of America	12-year-old Brooks Bracewell and 14-year-old Georgia Caroline Geer were both last seen at the UtoteM convenience store off of Interstate 45 on September 6, 1974. Though some remains were discovered by police in Alvin, Texas in 1976, they remained unidentified until April 1981.	Murdered	6 years
September 6th, 1974	Georgia Caroline Geer	14	United States of America	12-year-old Brooks Bracewell and 14-year-old Georgia Caroline Geer were both last seen at the UtoteM convenience store off of Interstate 45 on September 6, 1974. Though some remains were discovered by police in Alvin, Texas in 1976, they remained unidentified until April 1981.	Murdered	6 years
October 12th, 1974	Arlis Kay Perry	19	United States of America	A 19-year-old American newlywed who was murdered inside Stanford Memorial Church, within the grounds of Stanford University in California, on October 12, 1974. Her body was discovered displayed in a ritualistic and degrading position close to the altar of the church the following day. Her alleged murderer was identified via DNA profiling in 2018, but died by suicide before he was apprehended.	Murdered	1 day
October 18th, 1974	Melissa Anne Smith	17	United States of America	Victim of serial killer Ted Bundy. Smith vanished from Midvale, Utah and her body was found nine days later on a hillside in Summit Park. She was beaten, raped, sodomized, and strangled with nylon stockings. Bundy shampooed Smith's hair and applied makeup to her post-mortem.	Murdered	9 days
October 31st, 1974	Laura Ann Aime	17	United States of America	Victim of serial killer Ted Bundy. Aime disappeared from Lehi, Utah, her body discovered by hikers in American Fork Canyon roughly a month later. She was beaten, raped, sodomized, and strangled with nylon stockings. Bundy shampooed Aime's hair and applied makeup to her post-mortem.	Murdered	1 month
November 14th, 1974	Shirley Hubbard	15	United Kingdom	Girl who disappeared from Worcester, England on 14 November 1974 while walking home from work. Police investigations failed to find any trace of her. In 1994 her body was found buried at the home of notorious Gloucester serial killers Fred and Rose West, who in total killed 12 women. Hubbard had been abducted by them in their car and murdered.	Murdered	20 years
November 16th, 1974	Mohamed Azad Mohamed Hussein	29	Singapore	Mohamed Azad went missing in Singapore on 16 November 1974, after he last went to his fiancée's house to meet his future father-in-law. Five days later, his body was discovered inside a gunny sack washed up the shore of Kallang Basin, with severe open wounds on his head, indicating that he had been murdered. Nadarajah Govindasamy, a businessman and father of Mohamed Azad's fiancée, was charged with the murder, and later sentenced in August 1975 to execution by hanging at Changi Prison on 28 January 1977.	Murdered	5 days
November 20th, 1974	Paul McGonagle	35	United States of America	McGonagle, the leader of the Mullen Gang, was killed by Whitey Bulger and buried on a Dorchester, MA, beach in November 1974.	Murdered	26 years
December 13th, 1974	Betty Van Patter	45	United States of America	Van Patter was a bookkeeper for the Black Panther Party who disappeared on December 13, 1974, and her body later found on a beach in the San Francisco Bay. It's believed she was murdered by party members when she threatened to reveal that they had major tax problems, but nobody has been charged in her murder to this day.	Murdered	5 weeks
December 31st, 1974	Janet Lesley Stewart	15	United Kingdom	British schoolgirl who went missing from Manchester on New Year's Eve, 1974. Two years later police found the dismembered body of a woman on waste ground in the Newton Heath area of the city, which was identified as Stewart's. She and two other women in Manchester had been killed by serial killer Trevor Hardy.	Murdered	2 years

== 1975 ==
Date	Person(s)	Age	Country of disappearance	Circumstances	Outcome	Time spent missing or unconfirmed
January 12th, 1975	Caryn Eileen Campbell	23	United States of America	Victim of serial killer Ted Bundy. On January 12, a registered nurse named Caryn Eileen Campbell disappeared while walking down a well-lit hallway between the elevator and her room at the Wildwood Inn (now the Wildwood Lodge) in Snowmass Village, 400 miles (640 km) southeast of Salt Lake City. Her nude body was found a month later next to a dirt road just outside the resort. She had been killed by blows to her head from a blunt instrument that left distinctive linear grooved depressions on her skull; her body also bore deep cuts from a sharp weapon.	Murdered	1 month
January 14th, 1975	Lesley Whittle	17	United Kingdom	Whittle was a British heiress who was kidnapped and held for ransom at a drainage reservoir at Bathpool Park by serial killer Donald Neilson on January 14, 1975. She was killed on the same day, but her body was found months later. Neilson was later convicted of her and another three murders, receiving four life sentences.	Murdered	2 months
February 25th, 1975	Marcia Trimble	9	United States of America	Girl Scout who was kidnapped, sexually assaulted and finally strangled while delivering cookies in Nashville, Tennessee on February 25, 1975. Her body was found on Easter Sunday, but her murder remained unsolved until 2008, when Jerome Sidney Barrett was convicted and sentenced to 44 years' imprisonment for her murder.	Murdered	33 days
March 15th, 1975	Julie Cunningham	26	United States of America	Victim of serial killer Ted Bundy. On March 15, 100 miles (160 km) northeast of Snowmass, Vail ski instructor Julie Cunningham, disappeared while walking from her apartment to a dinner date with a friend. Bundy later told Colorado investigators that he approached Cunningham on crutches and asked her to help carry his ski boots to his car, where he clubbed and handcuffed her before sexually assaulting and strangling her at a secondary site near Rifle, 90 miles (140 km) west of Vail. Weeks later, he made the six-hour drive from Salt Lake City to revisit her remains.	Murdered	15 years
March 25th, 1975	Katherine Lyon	10	United States of America	Katherine and Sheila Lyon disappeared on March 25, 1975 while walking home from a nearby mall in the suburbs of Washington, D.C. In 2014 Lloyd Lee Welch, a criminal serving time in a Delaware prison for molesting a child in that state, became a person of interest after cold-case investigators in Montgomery County, Maryland followed up on an interview he gave to a detective at the time of the girls' disappearance. In 2015 Welch was formally indicted and in September 2017, he pleaded guilty to two counts of first-degree murder "for the abduction and killing of Katherine and Shelia Lyon in 1975". Police said he had burned their bodies.	Murdered	40 years
March 25th, 1975	Sheila Lyon	12	United States of America		Murdered	40 years
March 29th, 1975	Sharron Prior	16	Canada	Sharron Prior was Canadian teenage girl who was abducted on March 29, 1975 from the Pointe-Saint-Charles area in Montreal, Quebec. and was found dead three days later after being murdered.	Murdered	3 days
April 15th, 1975	Melanie Suzanne Cooley	18	United States of America	A high school student who vanished after leaving Nederland High School in Nederland, Colorado on April 15, 1975. Her body was discovered in Coal Creek Canyon on May 2. She had been bludgeoned with a large rock and strangled. Cooley's murder has been tentatively linked to Ted Bundy, although her murder remains an open case.	Murdered	17 days
July 1st, 1975	Eamon Molloy	21	Northern Ireland	Molloy was abducted by the Provisional Irish Republican Army on 1 July 1975. The IRA accused Molloy of being an informant and his remains were recovered on 28 May 1999.	Murdered	24 years
July 7th, 1975	Priscilla Ann Blevins	27	United States of America	Priscilla Ann Blevins was a 27-year-old woman who was last seen alive at her home in Charlotte, North Carolina on July 7, 1975. Her remains were discovered nearly a decade later along Interstate 40 in Waynesville, North Carolina on March 29, 1985. Blevins remained unidentified for an additional 27 years; her identity was determined via DNA and dental records in 2012.	Murdered	37 years
July 31st, 1975	John Butkovich	18	United States of America	A PDM Contractors employee who vanished without a trace in July 1975. The day before his disappearance, Butkovich confronted John Wayne Gacy about overdue wages. Gacy strangled Butkovich to death on July 31, 1975, and buried him under the concrete floor of the tool room extension of his garage. Butkovich's remains were recovered on December 22, 1978; his body was conclusively identified on December 29, 1978.	Murdered	3 years
August 10th, 1975	Helen Bailey	8	United Kingdom	British child Helen Bailey disappeared while playing near her home in Great Barr, Birmingham, on 10 August 1975. The next day Bailey's body was found on a farm across the highway from her home; her throat had been cut. An inquest in 1976 concluded she may have died as a result of an "accident or practical joke gone wrong", but it has since come to light that she was strangled before her throat was cut and her case has been reclassified as murder. No one has been convicted of her murder as of 2021, despite a prisoner making a plausible confession in 1979.	Murdered	1 day
September, 1975	Margaret Fetterolf	16	United States of America	Fetterolf, student and frequent runaway, vanished from her home in Alexandria, Virginia in the summer of 1975. Her body was found on September 11, 1976, in Woodlawn, Maryland, showing signs of sexual assault and strangulation, but her killer(s) have not been arrested. She was not immediately identified, and was known as "Woodlawn Jane Doe" until her positive identification in 2021.	Murdered	46 years
September 3rd, 1975	Linda Kay Harmon	17	United States of America	Harmon was the first victim of serial killer Larry Ralston; she disappeared on her way to school. Her skeletal remains were discovered one month later.	Murdered	1 month
September 21st, 1975	Candace Lynn Starr	16	United States of America	Candace Starr was kidnapped from her home in Los Angeles by her former boyfriend on September 21, 1975 Michael Singh; for approximately three days she was held hostage before she was killed at a convenience store in New Mexico. She was not identified until 2009, through DNA analysis.	Murdered	34 years
September 24th, 1975	Pat Lowther	40	Canada	Pat Lowther was a Canadian poet from Vancouver, British Columbia who disappeared on September 24, 1975. Her body was found three weeks later in a creek near Squamish, British Columbia and her husband was convicted in 1977 of killing her.	Murdered	3 weeks
October 3rd, 1975	Tiede Herrema	54	Ireland	Dutch businessman who ran a factory in Limerick, Ireland, who was abducted by the Provisional IRA near his home in Castletroy on October 3, 1975. He was held in a house in Monasterevin during a two-week standoff between his kidnappers and the police, but was eventually released without incident.	Found alive	2 weeks
October 5th, 1975	Lesley Molseed	11	United Kingdom	Molseed was an English girl who was kidnapped from her home in Rochdale, on 5 October 1975 and subsequently sexually assaulted and murdered by her abductor. Molseed's body was found three days later, and a mentally ill man was erroneously convicted of her murder but later exonerated in 1992. Molseed's actual killer, Ronald Castree, was identified via DNA evidence in 2006, and sentenced to life imprisonment.	Murdered	3 days
November 5th, 1975	Travis Walton	22	United States of America	Travis Walton, an American forestry worker. disappeared on November 5, 1975 from Arizona in the Apache–Sitgreaves National Forests. He and his coworkers claimed Walton had been abducted by aliens.	Found alive	1 week
December, 1975 or 1976	Terry Peder Rasmussen	32	United States of America	Terry Peder Rasmussen was last seen by his family in Christmas of 1975 or 1976 with an unidentified woman. Rasmussen, under multiple aliases, went on to commit numerous crimes, including the Bear Brook murders and the murder of his wife Eunsoon Jun. While serving a 15 years to life in prison for Jun's murder, Rasmussen died in 2010 under a pseudonym. His name was not tied to the Bear Brook murders until 2017, and his real name was also not revealed until later that year through the use of Y-DNA testing.	Died prior to identity being discovered	42 years
December 11th, 1975	Anna Mae Aquash	30	United States of America	The body of Native American civil rights activist Anna Mae Aquash was found at Pine Ridge Indian Reservation in South Dakota on February 24, 1976. She had been missing for two months.	Murdered	2 months
December 25th, 1975	Stephen Menheniott	18	United Kingdom	Menheniott, a British teenager with severe learning difficulties, disappeared from his home on the Isles of Scilly on Christmas Day 1975. His parents claimed he had gone to the mainland to visit a girlfriend, but his dentist had been troubled by the injuries he had seen on Menheniott and reported his concerns to the police. His body was found on 1 March 1977, crudely buried in the local graveyard. He had been murdered by his abusive parents, most likely in the first weeks of 1976. The case gained notoriety because it was a rare example of murder on the islands.	Murdered	1 year, 2 months

== 1976 ==
Date	Person(s)	Age	Country of disappearance	Circumstances	Outcome	Time spent missing or unconfirmed
1976	Franz Jalics	49	Argentina	Hungarian Jesuit priest kidnapped by a death squad in Argentina during the Dirty War. He and another hostage, Orlando Yorio, were held captive for five months before being released by their captors.	Found alive	5 months
February, 1976	Deborah Diane Smith	17	United States of America	17-year-old Deborah Diane Smith disappeared in Salt Lake City, Utah in early February 1976. Her body was discovered by a Utah Power and Light worker checking on poles in an open pasture near Salt Lake City International Airport on April 1, 1976. Serial killer Ted Bundy is believed by some to be responsible for Smith's homicide, though he was never convicted of this murder.	Murdered	2 months
March 1st, 1976	P. Rajan	Unknown	India	Student at the National Institute of Technology Calicut who was abducted and tortured by Indian police on March 1, 1976, succumbing to his injuries. His remains were never retrieved, despite repeated inquiries from his family which brought the case to national attention.	Murdered	Never found
April 5th, 1976	Guillermo Vargas Aignasse	33	Argentina	Argentine Peronist politician who served as the Provincial Senator for the Tucumán Province until the 1976 Argentine coup d'état, when he was abducted by security forces. He has never been found, but two officers were later convicted of his suspected murder and sentenced to life imprisonment in 2008.	Murdered	Never found
April 6th, 1976	Darrell Samson	18	United States of America	Darrell Samson was last seen alive on April 6, 1976, in Chicago, Illinois. That same day, he was kidnapped and murdered by John Wayne Gacy. Gacy buried him underneath his dining room, with cloth lodged in his throat.	Murdered	3 years
May 4th, 1976	Nancy Lourie Grigsby	22	United States of America	A victim of serial killer Larry Ralston. Grigsby is believed to have been abducted while hitchhiking in Clifton, Ohio on May 4, 1976. Her skeletal remains were discovered in woodland in Clermont County six months later. Grigsby's murderer is known to have become acquainted with her through drinking at a tavern frequented by both in the year prior to her disappearance.	Murdered	6 months
May 14th, 1976	Randall Reffett	15	United States of America	On May 14, 1976, Randall Reffett disappeared in Chicago, Illinois, shortly after returning home from a dental appointment. Just hours after Reffett was last seen alive, Samuel Stapleton also vanished without a trace as he walked home from his sister's apartment; the two teenagers were close acquaintaces with each other. They were both murdered by John Wayne Gacy in the same evening and buried underneath his crawl space.	Murdered	2 years
May 14th, 1976	Samuel Stapleton	14	United States of America	On May 14, 1976, Randall Reffett disappeared in Chicago, Illinois, shortly after returning home from a dental appointment. Just hours after Reffett was last seen alive, Samuel Stapleton also vanished without a trace as he walked home from his sister's apartment; the two teenagers were close acquaintaces with each other. They were both murdered by John Wayne Gacy in the same evening and buried underneath his crawl space.	Murdered	3 years
June 3rd, 1976	Michael Bonnin	17	United States of America	On June 3, 1976, Michael Bonnin disappeared while traveling from Chicago to Waukegan. He was killed by John Wayne Gacy, who strangled with him a ligature and buried him underneath his spare bedroom.	Murdered	2 years
June 9th, 1976	David Stack	18	United States of America	Stack was a hitchhiker who was killed on June 9, 1976, by unknown assailants while travelling from Colorado to Utah, with his body found one day later in rural Tooele County. His body remained unidentified until 2015, and his killers remain unknown.	Murdered	39 years
June 13th, 1976	William Carroll Jr.	16	United States of America	On June 13, 1976, John Wayne Gacy lured teenager William Carroll Jr. to his home; he was never seen alive again. Gacy shortly thereafter murdered him. Carroll was buried in a common grave in Gacy's crawl space.	Murdered	2 years
July 4th, 1976	Dora Bloch	74–75	Uganda	Bloch was an Israeli-British citizen who was held hostage during the hijacking of Air France Flight 139 on June 27, 1976. She suffered an illness during the process and the plane was landed in Kampala, Uganda for treatment, but an indeterminate amount of time later, Bloch's body was found in a sugar plantation. It was determined that she had been killed on orders of then-President Idi Amin.	Murdered	3 years
July 17th, 1976	Carol Ann Park	30	United Kingdom	British woman who went missing from her Cumbria home on 17 July 1976. Her husband, Gordon Park, did not report her disappearance for six weeks, claiming she had gone to live with another man. In 1997 amateur divers found her body in Coniston Water, where Park was known to sail, and her case became known as the "Lady in the Lake". Gordon Park was convicted of her murder.	Murdered	21 years
July 24th or 25th, 1976	Cecelia Genatiempo	17	United States of America	High school student abducted, raped and murdered by serial killer John W. Hopkins. Her body was buried in a shallow grave, and was discovered by hunters three months later.	Murdered	3 months
July 28th, 1976	John Roselli	71	United States of America	Roselli, a mobster in the Chicago Outfit, on April 23, 1976, was called before the committee to testify about a conspiracy to kill President John F. Kennedy. Three months after his first round of testimony, the Committee wanted to recall Roselli, only to learn he had been missing since July 28, 1976. On August 3, Senator Howard Baker, a member of the new SSCIA, requested that the FBI investigate Roselli's disappearance. On August 9, 1976, Roselli's decomposing body was found by a fisherman in a 55-gallon steel fuel drum floating in Dumfoundling Bay near Miami, Florida.	Murdered	12 days
August, 1976	Margarita Trlin	21	Argentina	Argentine architect who was kidnapped in August 1976 during the Dirty War and held in various detention centers, where she was physically and mentally tortured by military officers. She was later released following an Executive Decree.	Found alive	7 months
August 5th, 1976	James Haakenson	16	United States of America	On August 5, 1976, James Haakenson was last heard phoning his family, possibly from John Wayne Gacy's home shortly before his murder. Haakenson died of suffocation. He remained unidentified for four decades, before his identification on July 19, 2017.	Murdered	40 years
August 6th, 1976	Rick Johnston	17	United States of America	On August 6, 1976, just 24 hours after the murder of James Haakenson, Rick Johnston was also murdered by John Wayne Gacy. His body was buried in Gacy's crawl space on top of Haakenson's body.	Murdered	2 years
September 30th, 1976	Ana Teresa Diego	22	Argentina	In 1976, Diego was kidnapped and summarily killed by the military junta of Argentina in the area of El Bosque de La Plata for her membership in the Communist Youth Federation. Her mother was a founding member of the Mothers of the Plaza de Mayo. Diego's body was found in a mass grave and identified in 2012. An asteroid, 11441 Anadiego, is named after her.	Murdered	36 years
October 24th, 1976	Kenneth Parker	16	United States of America	On October 24, 1976, teenage friends Kenneth Parker and Michael Marino disappeared after last being seen on Clark Street in Chicago, Illinois. They were abducted and killed by John Wayne Gacy.	Murdered	3 years
October 24th, 1976	Michael Marino	14	United States of America	On October 24, 1976, teenage friends Kenneth Parker and Michael Marino disappeared after last being seen on Clark Street in Chicago, Illinois. They were abducted and killed by John Wayne Gacy.	Murdered	3 years
October 26th, 1976	William Bundy	19	United States of America	On October 26, 1976, two days after the deaths of Kenneth Parker and Michael Marino, construction worker William Bundy also disappeared after informing his family he was to attend a party. He was suffocated by John Wayne Gacy. He remained unidentified for 35 years before his November 2011 identification.	Murdered	35 years
November 12th, 1976	Renee MacRae	36	United Kingdom	Scottish woman Renee MacRae and her son Andrew were last seen on 12 November 1976. Their bodies have never been found. In September 2022, William MacDowell was found guilty of the murder of MacRae and her son and sentenced to a minimum of 30 years in prison.	Murdered	Never found
November 12th, 1976	Andrew MacRae	3	United Kingdom	Scottish woman Renee MacRae and her son Andrew were last seen on 12 November 1976. Their bodies have never been found. In September 2022, William MacDowell was found guilty of the murder of MacRae and her son and sentenced to a minimum of 30 years in prison.	Murdered	Never found
November, 1976	Francis Alexander	21	United States of America	Sometime around c. December 1, 1976, Francis Alexander was murdered by John Wayne Gacy. His last contact with his family was a phone call to his mother sometime in November and his family did not report him missing as they believed he had moved to California shortly thereafter and started afresh. He remained unidentified for 44 years before having his identity confirmed on October 25, 2021.	Murdered	44 years
December, 1976	Gregory Godzik	17	United States of America	In December 1976, Gregory Godzik disappeared. He was last seen alive by his girlfriend outside her house. Godzik had started working for John Wayne Gacy less than three weeks before his disappearance; he was later murdered by Gacy on December 12, 1976. Godzik's car was later found abandoned and his family had contacted Gacy about Godzik's disappearance, with Gacy claiming that Godzik had expressed desire to run away from home; he also claimed to have received an answering machine message from Godzik shortly after he had disappeared. When asked if he could play the message for Godzik's parents, Gacy said he had erased it.	Murdered	2 years
December, 1976	Evelyn Colon	15	United States of America	The dismembered remains of Colon, a pregnant teenager from New Jersey, were found stuffed in several suitcases in White Haven, Pennsylvania in 1976. She remained unidentified for over four decades, known only as "Beth Doe". In 2021, she was officially identified, and in response, authorities arrested her then-boyfriend, Luis Sierra, and charged him with the murder. He is now awaiting trial for the murder.	Murdered	45 years
December 10th, 1976	George Seitz	81	United States of America	George Seitz was an American military veteran of World War I who disappeared on December 10, 1976, in Jamaica in New York City after he was murdered. Some of his remains were discovered and identified in 2019. Martin Motta pleaded guilty to his murder in October 2022, and received a 20-year sentence.	Murdered	43 years

== 1977 ==
Date	Person(s)	Age	Country of disappearance	Circumstances	Outcome	Time spent missing or unconfirmed
1977	Gordon Sanderson	26	Canada	Gordon Sanderson's body was found in a septic tank in Lindbrook, Canada on April 13, 1977. He had been shot to death, possibly up to a year before his body was found. Until his identification in 2021, he was referred to as "Septic Tank Sam".	Murdered	44 years
January 15th, 1977	Elaina Marie Bear	15	United States of America	Bear was the fourth victim of serial killer Larry Ralston; she disappeared while hitchhiking home. Her nude, frozen remains were discovered in a Clinton County creek bed six weeks later.	Murdered	Six weeks
January 20th, 1977	John Szyc	19	United States of America	On January 20, 1977, John Syzc was never seen alive again after being lured into John Wayne Gacy's car on the pretext of buying Syzc's Plymouth Satellite. Gacy later confessed to strangling the youth in his spare bedroom, as well as selling Szyc's car to an employee.	Murdered	1 year
January 27th, 1977	Dagmar Hagelin	17	Argentina	Swedish-Argentine teenager who was kidnapped, tortured and later killed by Argentine military officers during the Dirty War on January 27, 1977. Her death is believed to be a result of mistaken identity.	Murdered	Never found
February 4th, 1977	Adriana Calvo	30	Argentina	Physicist, university professor and researcher who was kidnapped and detained by the Argentine military dictatorship on February 4, 1977. She was released together with her newborn daughter on April 28, and was the first witness to testify at the later Trial of the Juntas in 1985.	Found alive	2 months
March 15th, 1977	Jon Prestidge	20	United States of America	On March 15, 1977, Jon Prestidge disappeared and was last seen alive exiting a Near North Side restaurant in Chicago. John Wayne Gacy likely murdered him in the hours that followed. Shortly before his disappearance, Prestidge had mentioned he had obtained work with a local contractor.	Murdered	1 year
April 5th, 1977	Guido De Martino	34	Italy	Italian politician and member of the Socialist Party who was kidnapped and held hostage by the Camorra, but was released after the ransom of one billion lire was paid.	Found alive	6 weeks
May 7th, 1977	Pilar Calveiro	24	Argentina	Argentine political scientist kidnapped by a member of the Air Force on May 7, 1977, and held in detention by the military dictatorship. After her release, she went into exile in Mexico, where she has continued work to this day.	Found alive	1 year, 6 months
May 15th, 1977	Robert Nairac	28	United Kingdom	Nairac was a British Army officer in 14 Intelligence Company who was abducted from a pub in Dromintee, County Armagh, during an undercover operation on May 15, 1977, during his fourth tour of duty in Northern Ireland as a Military Intelligence Liaison Officer. It was later revealed that Nairac was killed by the Provisional Irish Republican Army. Although several individuals were convicted of Nairac's murder, his body has never been found. He is one of three individuals murdered by the IRA whose graves have never been revealed.	Murdered	6 months
May 20th, 1977	Javier Ybarra Bergé	64	Spain	Spanish industrialist and writer who was kidnapped by ETA separatists from his home in Bilbao on May 20, 1977. While he was initially held for ransom, Ybarra was later killed by his captors and his body dumped in a farmhouse, where he was located by authorities. His killers have never been apprehended.	Murdered	1 month
June, 1977	Christine Thornton	28	United States of America	In June 1977, Christine Thornton disappeared in Biloxi, Mississippi. Her body was found in 1982 near Granger, Wyoming, but was not identified until 2015. Serial killer Rodney Alcala was charged with her murder in 2016.	Murdered	38 years
July 5th, 1977	Matthew Bowman	19	United States of America	On July 5, 1977, Matthew Bowman disappeared after his mother last saw him at a suburban train station; he had intended to travel to Harwood Heights, Illinois for a court appointment. Shortly after vanishing, he was killed by John Wayne Gacy.	Murdered	1 year
July 15th, 1977	Ellen Jane Hover	23	United States of America	On July 15, 1977, Ellen Jane Hover was murdered by Rodney Alcala, and her remains were discovered in 1978.	Murdered	1 year
July 25th, 1977	Elizabeth Roberts	17	United States of America	Elizabeth Roberts, formerly known as "Precious Jane Doe", was a teenage girl who went missing on July 25, 1977 from Roseburg, Oregon and was found dead in Everett, Washington on 14 August 1977 after being murdered. She was not identified until 43 years later.	Murdered	43 years
July 28th, 1977	Emanuel Jaques	12	Canada	A 12-year-old Canadian boy of Portuguese ancestry who worked as a shoeshine boy in an impoverished district of Toronto. Jaques was abducted, sexually assaulted and murdered by three men on July 28, 1977. He was murdered approximately twelve hours after his abduction. Three men were ultimately convicted of Jacques' murder, while a fourth was acquitted.	Murdered	4 days
September 5th, 1977	Hanns Martin Schleyer	62	West Germany	German business executive and industry representative with SS ties who was kidnapped by RAF guerillas on September 5, 1977. His kidnappers demanded that the Germans free several of their members, but after learning that they had died in prison, they drove towards Brussels, executing Schleyer near Mulhouse, France, on October 18.	Murdered	1 month
September 15th, 1977	Robert Gilroy Jr.	18	United States of America	18-year-old Robert Gilroy Jr., the son of a Chicago police sergeant, was last seen alive on September 15, 1977. He was murdered by John Wayne Gacy and lived four blocks from Gacy's house. He was buried in Gacy's crawl space.	Murdered	1 year
September 25th, 1977	John Mowery	19	United States of America	On September 25, 1977, former U.S. Marine John Mowery disappeared after leaving his mother's house. John Wayne Gacy strangled Mowery and buried his body beneath his master bedroom.	Murdered	1 year
October 17th, 1977	Russell Nelson	21	United States of America	On October 17, 1977, Russell Nelson disappeared after last being seen outside a bar in Chicago, Illinois, looking for contracting work. He was never seen alive again. He was murdered by John Wayne Gacy and buried his body underneath his guest bedroom.	Murdered	1 year
November 9th, 1977	Evelyn Jane King	28	United States of America	The fourth victim of the Hillside Stranglers. King was lured from a bus stop into her murderers' vehicle. Her body was discovered near the Los Feliz Boulevard off-ramp of the Golden State Freeway.	Murdered	2 weeks
November 10th, 1977	Usharani Ganaison	7	Singapore	A seven-year-old schoolgirl who went missing after she went out running an errand for her father late in the night. Her family searched for her but to no avail, and they subsequently reported Usharani missing. The next day in the morning, Usharani was found dead nearby her home in Toa Payoh. An autopsy revealed the child had been sexually assaulted and strangled to death. Her uncle, Kalidass Sinnathamby Narayanasamy, was arrested two days later and due to sufficient evidence linking him to the crime, Kalidass was sentenced to death for his niece's murder.	Murdered	1 day
November 10th, 1977	Robert Winch	16	United States of America	On November 10, 1977, Robert Winch vanished without a trace and was murdered by John Wayne Gacy. He was buried in Gacy's crawl space.	Murdered	1 year
November 13th, 1977	Dolores Cepeda	12	United States of America	Two school friends abducted by the Hillside Stranglers while returning home from the Eagle Rock Plaza on Colorado Boulevard in Southern California on November 13, 1977. Their strangled bodies were discovered close to the Dodger Stadium on November 20.	Murdered	1 week
November 13th, 1977	Sonja Johnson	14	United States of America	Two school friends abducted by the Hillside Stranglers while returning home from the Eagle Rock Plaza on Colorado Boulevard in Southern California on November 13, 1977. Their strangled bodies were discovered close to the Dodger Stadium on November 20.	Murdered	1 week
November 18th, 1977	Tommy Boling	20	United States of America	On November 18, 1977, 20-year-old Tommy Boling disappeared after leaving a bar in Chicago, Illinois. He was killed by John Wayne Gacy.	Murdered	1 year
November 25th, 1977	Cheng Geok Ha	10	Singapore	Cheng Geok Ha was a ten-year-old schoolgirl abducted from a car park close to her home at Chai Chee, Singapore, on 25 November 1977. Her body was discovered beneath a manhole on 7 December. An autopsy revealed the child had been sexually assaulted and strangled to death. Her neighbour, Quek Kee Siong, was later sentenced to death for Cheng's murder.	Murdered	12 days
December 9th, 1977	David Talsma	19	United States of America	On December 9, 1977, U.S. Marine David Talsma disappeared after telling his mother he was to attend a rock concert in Hammond, Indiana. He was lured by John Wayne Gacy to enter his house and died by cause of ligature strangulation. He was buried in Gacy's crawl space.	Murdered	1 year

== 1978 ==
Date	Person(s)	Age	Country of disappearance	Circumstances	Outcome	Time spent missing or unconfirmed
1978	Ambrogio Fogar	36–37	Atlantic Ocean	Fogar, an Italian sailor, was stranded in the Atlantic Ocean after being capsized by orcas. He survived more than 10 weeks on a life raft with his friend and journalist Mauro Mancini, who died of pneumonia two days after they were rescued.	Found alive	2 months, 2 weeks
1978	Doina Bumbea	28	North Korea	Romanian painter who was kidnapped by North Korean agents while doing a supposed art exhibition in Pyongyang, North Korea. She was later forcefully married to American defector James Joseph Dresnok, with whom she had two children. She died of cancer in January 1997, having never returned to her homeland.	Detained until her death	19 years
1978	Harry Domela	78	Unknown	Latvian-German impostor who pretended to be a deposed crown prince, for which he was put on trial, but later acquitted. After experiencing a short term burst of popularity, he disappeared from public view until 1933, when it was learned through Dutch author Jef Last that he was living in the Netherlands under the pseudonym "Victor Zsajka". After Domela was last seen alive in 1978 it has now been clarified that according to research done by Jens Kirsten who is a Weimar-based scholar that Domela had died in Maracaibo on October 4, 1979.	Died (unknown cause)	1 year
January 1st, 1978	Nicholas Scibetta	22	United States of America	Scibetta was a New York mobster who was killed by his brother-in-law, Sammy Gravano and disappeared on New Years Day 1978. Part of the motive for the murder was that Scibetta was suspected of being gay. Scibetta was dismembered and except for an arm, his body was never found.	Murdered	Never found
January 3rd, 1978	Roberto Herrera Ibarguen	57	Guatemala	Guatemalan politician and member of the National Liberation Movement who was kidnapped and held hostage by a leftist militant group who accused him of organizing the murders of guerilla leaders and repressing teachers' strikes. He was released without incident after a ransom and a commander of theirs was released.	Found alive	27 days
January 8th, 1978	Brian Glenfeldt	17	United States of America	Brian Glenfeldt and Belinda Worsley were both last seen leaving for a Youth-for-Christ meeting in Hialaeh, FL, but failed to meet friends at an ice cream parlor. The two youths were found dead with gunshot wounds in nearby forests. Serial killer John Errol Ferguson was apprehended on April 5th, 1978, and convicted of their murders as part of the Carol City murders. Ferguson was executed in 2013.	Murdered	2 days
January 8th, 1978	Belinda Worley	17	United States of America	Brian Glenfeldt and Belinda Worsley were both last seen leaving for a Youth-for-Christ meeting in Hialaeh, FL, but failed to meet friends at an ice cream parlor. The two youths were found dead with gunshot wounds in nearby forests. Serial killer John Errol Ferguson was apprehended on April 5th, 1978, and convicted of their murders as part of the Carol City murders. Ferguson was executed in 2013.	Murdered	2 days
January 14th, 1978	Choi Eun-hee	26	British Hong Kong	Choi, a South Korean actress, travelled to Hong Kong after being offered to direct a film and possibly work with a Hong Kong performing school. She was instead abducted to North Korea by agents of Kim Jong-il, where she was made to study and direct films with her ex-husband Shin Sang-ok, who was kidnapped 6 months after her. Choi was not aware she had been kidnapped until 5 years after the fact and was able to escape after 8 years of capture.	Found alive	8 years
January 23rd, 1978	Édouard-Jean Empain	41	France	French-Belgian industrialist and the CEO of the Schneider-Empain industrial holding company, Empain was kidnapped and held captive by a group of men, who demanded ransom in exchange for his release. Empain was eventually rescued and most of his abductors arrested, but left permanently traumatized by the event.	Found alive	2 months
January 27th, 1978	Manon Dubé	10	Canada	Canadian girl from Quebec who disappeared from her native village of Massawippi on January 27, 1978. Her body was found on March 24, but the cause of death was never ascertained. The National Post suggested that she had been kidnapped and murdered after having extensive research done on the evidence.	Died (unknown cause)	2 months
February 16th, 1978	William Kindred	19	United States of America	On February 16, 1978, John Wayne Gacy killed 19-year-old William Kindred. Kindred disappeared after telling his fiancée, who knew Gacy, that he was going to a bar. He was the final victim to be buried in Gacy's crawl space.	Murdered	1 year
February 12th, 1978	Giovanna Amati	18	Italy	Amati was kidnapped by a trio of French gangsters, led by Jean Daniel Nieto, and held for ransom, during which she was allegedly raped by the ringleader. She was released on April 27, 1978, after the ransom of 800 million lire was paid, but the kidnappers were all later caught, including Nieto, with whom Amati had fallen in love. She later became a professional racing driver and the most recent female driver to enter the Formula One World Championship.	Found alive	2 months, 2 weeks
April 8th, 1978	Brendan Megraw	23	Northern Ireland	Megraw was abducted and murdered by the Provisional IRA on 8 April 1978. His body was discovered in 2014.	Murdered	36 years
May 23rd, 1978	Charles Antonio Hattula	25	United States of America	On May 23, 1978, Charles Hattula was found deceased in the Pecatonica River near Freeport, Illinois. He had been missing since May 13. Des Plaines authorities had suspected that Hattula may have possibly been murdered by John Wayne Gacy; Hattula was known to have conflicts with Gacy. At the time of his death, Gacy had murdered at least 29 young men and boys and had disposed of many of the bodies in his crawl space. As no more bodies could fit in the crawl space, it left the possibility that he may have disposed of Hattula's body in the Pecatonica River. However, Des Plaines authorities were told Hattula had fallen to his death from a bridge, and his death was ruled as asphyxia by drowning.	Drowned	
May 25th, 1978	Brian McKinney	22	Northern Ireland	McClory and McKinney were abducted and murdered by the Provisional IRA (PIRA) on May 25, 1978. Their remains were discovered in Colgagh Bog, County Monaghan, on 29 June 1999. McKinney is believed to have been murdered due to his having stolen weapons from the PIRA; McClory is believed to have been abducted due to his known association with McKinney.	Murdered	21 years
May 25th, 1978	John McClory	18	Northern Ireland	McClory and McKinney were abducted and murdered by the Provisional IRA (PIRA) on May 25, 1978. Their remains were discovered in Colgagh Bog, County Monaghan, on 29 June 1999. McKinney is believed to have been murdered due to his having stolen weapons from the PIRA; McClory is believed to have been abducted due to his known association with McKinney.	Murdered	21 years
June 16th-23rd, 1978	Timothy O'Rourke	20	United States of America	Sometime between June 16–23, 1978, Timothy O'Rourke disappeared after last being known to have left his apartment to purchase cigarettes. Shortly before his disappearance, O'Rourke had told his roommate a contractor on the Northwest Side of Chicago, Illinois, had offered him a job. He was murdered by John Wayne Gacy and his body was dumped into the Des Plaines River, as Gacy had no more space for bodies in his crawl space.	Murdered	6 months
June 18th, 1978	Steven Hicks	18	United States of America	On June 18, 1978, Serial killer Jeffrey Dahmer picked up a hitchhiker named Steven Mark Hicks, who was almost 19. Dahmer lured the youth to his house on the pretext of drinking. Dahmer then bludgeoned and strangled Hicks to death before masturbating over his corpse. The following day, Dahmer dissected Hicks' body in his basement. He later buried the remains in a shallow grave in his back yard. After several weeks, he unearthed the remains and pared the flesh from the bones. He dissolved the flesh in acid before flushing the solution down the toilet. He crushed the bones with a sledgehammer and scattered them in the woodland behind the family home.	Murdered	13 years
July, 1978	Devonna Nelson	15	United States of America	Sometime in July, 1978, 15-year-old runaway Devonna Nelson went missing near Seattle, Washington, where serial killer Wayne Nance was active at the time. On February 27, 1980, her badly decomposed body was discovered by the crew of a slow-moving freight train on a road bank close to the Interstate 90 in the city of Missoula. Nelson's body was not identified until February 16th, 1985, and while Nance is suspected he has never been linked to her death.	Murdered	7 years
July 19th, 1978	Shin Sang-ok	26	British Hong Kong	Shin, a South Korean film director, was abducted by North Korean agents on orders from Kim Jong-il in Hong Kong, where Shin had been looking for his ex-wife Choi Eun-hee, who had been kidnapped 6 months prior. After spending three years in prison, the pair were reunited and ordered to direct movies to boost the North Korean film industry, which they did until their escape in 1986.	Found alive	8 years
July 25th, 1978	Raymond West	72	United States of America	A tax client allegedly murdered by extortionist James W. Lewis in July 1978. Although West's body was discovered in Lewis's attic, all charges filed against West were ultimately dropped due to police not reading him his rights and collecting evidence without a warrant.	Murdered	3 weeks
July 31st, 1978	Kaoru Hasuike	20	Japan	Kaoru Hasuike and his then-girlfriend, Yukiko Okudo, were abducted by North Korean agents from Kashiwazaki, Niigata on July 31, 1978. The two eventually married in North Korea and gave birth to two kids before the family was repatriated to Japan in October 2002.	Found alive	24 years
August 12th, 1978	Hitomi Soga	19	Japan	Hitomi Soga and her mother, Miyoshi, was abducted by North Korean agents from their home island of Sado on August 12, 1978. Hitomi was able to return to Japan in October 2002, and her American husband Charles Jenkins as well as their two daughters came to Japan in July 2004. Miyoshi, however, still has not returned to Japan.	Found alive	24 years
August 13th, 1978	John Dawson Dewhirst	26	Democratic Kampuchea	John Dawson Dewhirst was a British teacher and amateur yachtsman. He disappeared after being captured and detained as a suspected spy by the Khmer Rouge on August 13, 1978. While the cause of death is unknown and a body has never been found, the former administrator of the prison Dewhirst was held in admitted that Dewhirst's body, among 9 other dead westerners, was burned to destroy evidence.	Died (unknown cause)	Never found
August 22nd, 1978	Marilee Bruszer	33	United States of America	Marilee Bruszer went missing on August 22, 1978, from Long Beach, California. In August 2015, a body that had been discovered in Utah in September 1978 was identified as hers. Her murder remains unsolved	Murdered	37 years
November, 1978	Marlyse Honeychurch	24	United States of America	Marlyse Honeychurch and her two daughters, Sarah McWaters and Marie Vaughn, were last seen in November 1978 with a man claiming to be Bob Evans, who was later identified as serial killer Terry Peder Rasmussen. The bodies of Honeychurch and Vaughn were found in a metal drum near a burned down store in the Bear Brook State Park in Allenstown, New Hampshire in 1985, while McWaters' body was found nearby in 2000 together with the previously unidentified Rea Rasmussen, whose DNA analysis showed that she was the daughter of Terry. The identities of the three other victims were not identified until 2019, and it is believed the four victims were murdered some time between 1977 and 1981.	Murdered	41 years
November, 1978	Marie Vaughn	7	United States of America		Murdered	41 years
November, 1978	Sarah McWaters	11 months	United States of America		Murdered	41 years
November 3rd, 1978	Theresa Allore	19	Canada	Theresa Allore was a Canadian college student who disappeared on November 3, 1978, from Champlain College Lennoxville in the Eastern Townships of Quebec and was found dead five months later.	Murdered	5 months
November 4th, 1978	Frank Landingin	19	United States of America	On November 4, 1978, Frank Landingin was last seen alive by his father walking along Foster Avenue in Chicago, Illinois; he was killed by John Wayne Gacy later that day. Eight days after his disappearance, his naked body was found close to an inlet in the Des Plaines River by two duck hunters on November 12. He was identified on November 14; he was the first victim of Gacy's to be identified.	Murdered	10 days
November 24th, 1978	James Mazzara	20	United States of America	On November 24, 1978, James Mazzara disappeared after Thanksgiving dinner with his family; he was last seen walking in the direction of Bughouse Square. Mazzara had informed his sister the day before his disappearance that he was working in construction. He was killed by John Wayne Gacy and his body was discarded in the Des Plaines River.	Murdered	1 month
December 11th, 1978	Robert Piest	15	United States of America	In the late hours of December 11, 1978, teenager Robert Piest was working at the Nisson Pharmacy. He was approached by John Wayne Gacy, who mentioned that his firm often hired teenage boys almost double the pay Piest earned at the pharmacy. He lured the 15-year-old youth to his house and suffocated him. Gacy stated that Piest was "crying, scared", while also admitting to having received a phone call from a business acquaintance as Piest lay dying. He was dumped in the Des Plaines River. On April 9, 1979, a man walking along a Grundy County towpath discovered a decomposed body tangled in roots on the edge of the Des Plaines River. The body was identified via dental records as being that of Robert Piest the same evening.	Murdered	3 months
December 16th, 1978	Kerry Graham	15	United States of America	Friends Kerry Graham and Francine Trimble disappeared on December 16, 1978, after leaving their homes in Forestville, California to visit a shopping mall in Santa Rosa. Their remains were discovered on July 8, 1979, approximately 80 miles north of Forestville, but they were not identified until November 2015 where their identities were confirmed via the use of DNA profiling. Their murders have yet to be solved.	Murdered	37 years
December 16th, 1978	Francine Trimble	14	United States of America	Friends Kerry Graham and Francine Trimble disappeared on December 16, 1978, after leaving their homes in Forestville, California to visit a shopping mall in Santa Rosa. Their remains were discovered on July 8, 1979, approximately 80 miles north of Forestville, but they were not identified until November 2015 where their identities were confirmed via the use of DNA profiling. Their murders have yet to be solved.	Murdered	37 years
December 20th, 1978	Elena Holmberg	47	Argentina	Argentine diplomat and official of the military dictatorship who vanished on December 20, 1978. Her decomposed body was found over a month later, and positively identified by her cousin. It's believed that she had been assassinated by military officers on orders from Emilio Eduardo Massera, who believed that she had information that would reveal his connections to the Montoneros.	Murdered	1 month
December 29th, 1978	Stephen Dean Holmes	14	United Kingdom	The first victim of serial killer Dennis Nilsen. Holmes was an Irish teenager whom Nilsen lured to his Cricklewood home upon the promise of drinking alcohol on the evening of December 29, 1978; he was strangled to death the following morning and his body later incinerated upon a bonfire. Holmes' identity was established in November 2006.	Murdered	28 years

== 1979 ==
Date	Person(s)	Age	Country of disappearance	Circumstances	Outcome	Time spent missing or unconfirmed
1979	Shirley Soosay	34	United States of America	Soosay was a Canadian Cree woman who was last seen by her family at her brother's funeral in 1977. She told her family she would be visiting Seattle, WA, and corresponded with the family by letter until they abruptly stopped in 1979. Soosay's body was discovered in an almond orchard, far from any road, in Delano, California, on July 14th, 1980. Soosay's niece, Violet Soosay-Wolfe, began searching for her that same year but Soosay's body would remain unidentified until 2020. Wilson Chouest was convicted of her murder in 2018 by linking DNA found on Soosay's unidentified body to another woman's murder.	Murdered	40 years
January 4th, 1979	Diann Joyce Remington	22	United States of America	Remington was a Spokane Community College student who disappeared from her mother's home in Richland, Washington on January 4, 1979. Her body was found by goose hunters in a field near Benton City on December 29. Convicted kidnapper and murderer Stanley Bernson was convicted of her murder while jailed for an attempted stabbing.	Murdered	11 months
January 14th, 1979	Marcia Moore	50	United States of America	Marcia Moore was an American writer, astrologer and yoga teacher who disappeared on January 14, 1979. Her remains were found two years later in the woods near her Washington home. Friends of Moore speculated that she may have been murdered, but authorities were not to able to determine a cause of death.	Died (unknown cause)	2 years
March, 1979	Gerard Evans	24	Ireland	Gerard Evans disappeared in County Monaghan, Republic of Ireland in March 1979; his remains were found in October 2010 in the townland of Carrickrobin, near Hackballscross, County Louth.	Murdered	31 years
March-May, 1979	Tammy Alexander	15	United States of America	Tammy Alexander disappeared some time in early 1979 after it is believed she ran away from her home in Hernando County, Florida. She was found dead, shot to death in a field, in the town of Caledonia, New York on November 10, 1979. She was not identified until 2015, over 35 years later, by a DNA match after an old school friend tried to locate her and a missing persons report was filed.	Murdered	35 years
March 29th, 1979	Kathy Halle	19	United States of America	Halle disappeared while traveling to collect her sister from a North Aurora shopping center. Her body was discovered in the Fox River the following month. In 2024, police were able to use DNA evidence to link serial killer Bruce Lindahl to her murder.	Murdered	1 month
April 15th, 1979	Harriet Simmons	40	United States of America	A victim of serial killer Terry Hyatt. Simmons was mother of seven and a night manager at a Raleigh restaurant. Simmons disappeared while travelling to her boyfriend's home on April 15, 1979. Her skeletal remains were discovered in the Pisgah National Forest on March 23, 1980.	Murdered	11 months
May 22nd, 1979	Larry Perry	9	United States of America	The first known victim of Michael Carl George. Perry was lured from his grandparents' home in Dumfries, Virginia on May 22, 1979. His body was never found; however, George confessed to the crime in 1982. He later pleaded guilty to pleaded guilty to abduction and involuntary manslaughter. He was later executed for another murder.	Murdered	3 years
May 25th, 1979	Etan Patz	6	United States of America	Etan Patz disappeared while on his way to school in lower Manhattan on May 25, 1979, and by 2001 he was considered legally dead. He was the first missing child featured on a milk carton. In May 2012, authorities re-opened the case. Pedro Hernandez, a former bodega stock clerk, was convicted in February 2017 of kidnapping and murdering the boy, based solely on his own confession. Neither Patz's body, which Hernandez said he put in the trash, nor any other relevant physical evidence was ever identified.	Murdered	Never found
June 24th, 1979	Lucinda Lynn Schaefer	16	United States of America	Schaefer disappeared on June 24, 1979 from Redondo Beach, having been kidnapped by serial killer duo Lawrence Bittaker and Roy Norris. Bittaker and Norris each raped her before strangling her to death, ignoring her requests to pray before being killed. Schaefer's body was thrown into a canyon and has yet to be found.	Murdered	2 years
July 11th, 1979	Sally Ann McGrath	22	United Kingdom	British woman last seen in Cathedral Square, Peterborough at 2:45pm on 11 July 1979, after telling friends that she was heading to the nearby unemployment office. Her body was found in a shallow grave in a forest at Castor Hanglands, Cambridgeshire, in March 1980. It was not until 2012 that sex offender Paul Taylor was convicted of her murder.	Murdered	8 months
August 3rd, 1979	Maya Fukushima	5	Japan	5-year-old Maya Fukushima went missing from a shrine near her home in Ashikaga, Tochigi. Her body was found naked and stuffed in a backpack on the banks of the Watarase River. Fukushima's case is considered the first of the North Kanto Serial Young Girl Kidnapping and Murder Case, a series of unsolved kidnapping and murder cases of young girls in the Northern Kanto Region.	Murdered	6 days
August 5th, 1979	Alison Chambers	16	United Kingdom	16-year-old British child who lived in a children's home in Gloucester. She was a frequent visitor to the home of Fred and Rose West who lived in the city. Her disappearance in August 1979 was reported to the Missing Persons Bureau and initially to the police as an absconder from care. Her body was found in the home of the Wests in 1994. Along with 11 other women, she had been murdered by the couple.	Murdered	15 years
August 14th, 1979	Gwenn Story	19	United States of America	A young Ohio native discovered stabbed to death in a Las Vegas, Nevada, parking lot on August 14, 1979. She had died hours prior to her discovery, but remained unidentified until December 2023. Her murder remains unsolved.	Murdered	44 years
August 27th, 1979	Dori Ghezzi	33	Italy	Italian singer and the country's representative for the Eurovision Song Contest of 1975 who was kidnapped on August 27, 1979, and held for ransom together with fellow singer Fabrizio De André. Both were held in the Supramonte mountains, but released after a ransom of 500 million lire was paid to the abductors.	Found alive	4 months
August 30th, 1979	Jean Seberg	40	France	Jean Seberg was an American actress who lived in France, and disappeared on August 30, 1979. Her body was found on September 8, 1979, wrapped in a blanket in the back seat of her Renault which was parked near her Paris apartment.	Suicide	9 days
November 10th, 1979	Katarina Jakobsson	29	Sweden	On 10 November 1979, Katarina Jakobsson's father reported his daughter missing. Her skeletal remains were retrieved during dives in Inre hamnen, Malmö during late January 1980. In a confession to police, suspect Bengt Hjalmarsson admitted to having murdered and dismembered Jakobsson's corpse in November 1979, before disposing of her flesh by consuming it over the course of several meals.	Murdered	2 months
December, 1979	Michelle Busha	18	United States of America	Busha was a Bay City, TX, woman last seen alive in December, 1979, on the way to Louisiana, having decided to travel the country with her friends the month prior. On May 26, 1980, then Minnesota State Trooper Robert Leroy Nelson picked Busha up outside of Bricelyn, MN; he then raped, beat, and ultimately strangled her to death, leaving her body in Blue Earth, Minnesota. Busha's body was discovered approximately 3-7 days later but would remain unidentified until 2015	Murdered	35 years
December 3rd, 1979	Kenneth Ockenden	23	United Kingdom	Kenneth Ockenden, a Canadian student on a tour of the UK, was last seen in London on December 3, 1979. In 1983, investigators discovered that he had become a victim of the serial killer Dennis Nilsen, who had invited him to his house and strangled him with a headphone cord. Ockenden was one of the few victims of Nilsen who was widely reported as a missing person.	Murdered	4 years

== Sources ==
- Dvorchak, Robert J.; Holewa, Lisa (1992). Milwaukee Massacre: Jeffrey Dahmer and the Milwaukee Murders. New York City: Dell Publishing. ISBN 978-0-7090-5003-2. Archived from the original on April 12, 2023.
- Keppel, Robert (2005). The Riverman: Ted Bundy and I Hunt for the Green River Killer (Paperback ed.). New York City: Pocket Books. ISBN 978-0-7434-6395-9. Updated after the arrest and confession of the Green River killer, Gary Ridgway.
- Keppel, Robert (2010). The Riverman: Ted Bundy and I Hunt for the Green River Killer (Kindle ed.). New York City: Simon & Schuster. ISBN 978-1-4391-9434-8.
- Masters, Brian (1993). The Shrine of Jeffrey Dahmer. London, England: Hodder & Stoughton. ISBN 978-0-340-59194-9.
- Michaud, Stephen; Aynesworth, Hugh (August 1999) [1983]. The Only Living Witness: The True Story of Serial Sex Killer Ted Bundy (Paperback; revised ed.). Irving, Texas: Authorlink Press. ISBN 978-1-928704-11-9. Archived from the original on May 23, 2024.
- Norris, Joel (1992). Jeffrey Dahmer. London, England: Constable & Robinson. ISBN 978-0-09-472060-2. Archived from the original on April 12, 2023.
- Roy, Jody M. (2002). Love to Hate: America's Obsession with Hatred and Violence. New York City: Columbia University Press. ISBN 978-0-231-12569-7.
- Rule, Ann (1989). The Stranger Beside Me (Paperback; revised and updated ed.). New York City: Signet Books. ISBN 978-0-451-16493-3.
- Rule, Ann (2000). The Stranger Beside Me (Paperback; updated 20th anniversary ed.). New York: Signet Books. ISBN 978-0-451-20326-7.
- Rule, Ann (2009). The Stranger Beside Me (Paperback; updated 2009 ed.). New York City: Pocket Books. ISBN 978-1-4165-5959-7.
- Sullivan, Kevin M. (2009). The Bundy Murders: A Comprehensive History (Paperback ed.). Jefferson, North Carolina: McFarland and Co. ISBN 978-0-7864-4426-7.
