= Marilee =

Marilee may refer to

- Marilee, Texas, an unincorporated community in the United States
- Marilee Bruszer (1944–1978), American murder victim
- Marilee Jones (born 1951), American college admissions consultant at the Massachusetts Institute of Technology
- Marilee Lindemann, Professor of English at the University of Maryland, U.S.
- Marilee Stepan (1935–2021), American swimmer
