= Murder of Linda Childers =

1970 formerly unidentified victim

Linda Sue Childers
- Born: Linda Sue Childers; September 4, 1946
- Died: December 31, 1970 (aged 24); Ledyard, Connecticut, U.S.
- Cause of death: Murder by gunshot
- Body discovered: May 30, 1974; 52 years ago
- Other name: Lorraine Stahl
- Known for: Previously unidentified decedent
- Height: around 5 ft 2 in

Linda Sue Childers (September 4, 1946 – December 31, 1970) also known by her alias Lorraine Stahl was a formerly unidentified murder victim and fugitive from Louisville, Kentucky, who died from gunshot wounds in 1970 and was discovered dead four years later in Ledyard, Connecticut. She was identified 50 years later by DNA analysis in February 2024.

== Murder and body discovery ==
Childers and her boyfriend, Gustavous Lee Carmichael, who was an escaped convicted bank robber, were involved in criminal activity. Carmichael escaped from federal custody in October 1970 when he was being brought from Massachusetts to Connecticut to be sentenced. He later met Childers, and robbed a bank in New Jersey shortly before Christmas Day. Because of their criminal background, both individuals used aliases, Childers used Lorraine Stahl and Carmichael used Dirk Stahl. Carmichael illegally obtained identification documents to support their aliases. They were able to rent a house in Noank and start a checking account with their stolen identifications.

They hid from police at the home of Richard DeFreitas in Ledyard, Connecticut. DeFreitas was a bank robber who worked with a criminal named Donald Brant. After Childers told DeFreitas' common-law wife, Joanne Rainello, that she felt that the group could be arrested, she was killed along with Carmichael by DeFreitas and Brant. The victims were brought to the back of the house by DeFreitas and Brant, where they were killed. Four years later, on May 30, 1974, the state police in Connecticut discovered the skeletal remains of Linda Childers and her boyfriend. The police acted after obtaining a tip from DeFreitas' common-law wife, and they found two graves at the burial site.

Linda Childers was found wearing a leather vest, a sweater, and a pair of boots. A ring was found that contains the letters "J.H.S.N.", the year 1917, and the letters "I.L.N.". Another ring found was identified to be a fake emerald.

== Investigation ==
An autopsy conducted by investigators concluded that both victims died from gunshot wounds to the head. Richard DeFreitas and Donald Brant were arrested by police and convicted of the two murders. Through dental records, authorities were able to identify Carmichael, but investigators were unable to identify Childers for the next fifty years. The police described her as a white woman who was between 18 and 30 years old. Investigators stated that her height was around 5'2". She was often seen driving in a green 1964 Oldsmobile that was later found abandoned in Hartford, Connecticut.

Childers used the identity of Lorraine Stahl, a former resident of the area. Stahl was visited by investigators who realized that her identity was stolen. Investigators had a difficult time identifying Childers because her body was found decomposed and investigators could not establish her eye and hair color. A sketch of the woman's appearance was created. The case later became cold.

A few decades later, Childers' dental information was entered into the National Missing and Unidentified Persons System and the Combined DNA Index System. In 2022, the police collaborated with Othram, a company based in Texas that conducts DNA analysis, and the case was then reopened. DNA was entered into the genealogy database, GEDMatch Pro. In January 2024, the DNA results led to both Childers' sister, Angela Kortz-Funke, as well as the victim's daughter, and her identity was established in February. Childers' family stated that they knew she was in the northeastern part of the country before her disappearance.

== See also ==
- List of solved missing person cases (1970s)
