= Murder of Carla Walker =

1974 murder in Fort Worth, Texas, U.S.

- Walker c. 1974
- Location: Fort Worth, Texas, U.S.
- Date: February 17, 1974
- Attack type: Murder, kidnapping, rape
- Victim: Carla Walker
- Perpetrator: Glen Samuel McCurley Jr.
- Charges: Capital murder
- Verdict: Pleaded guilty
- Sentence: Life imprisonment without the possibility of parole

The murder of Carla Walker is an American murder case that occurred on February 17, 1974, when 17-year-old Carla Jan Walker of Fort Worth, Texas, was kidnapped from a bowling alley parking lot and was subsequently tortured, raped, and then strangled to death. Her body was found three days later in a culvert 30 minutes south of Fort Worth.

The murder remained a cold case for 46 years until September 2020, when DNA evidence recovered from Walker's clothing was sent to Othram Inc., who specialize in degraded DNA samples; the Oxygen network paid for the testing. The DNA matched with 77-year-old Glen Samuel McCurley, who was arrested for Walker's murder thereafter. He pleaded guilty to the murder in 2022 and was sentenced to life in prison without the possibility of parole. He died in July 2023.

== Kidnapping and murder ==
Carla Jan Walker was born on January 31, 1957, to Leighton and Doris Walker. At the time of her death she was a 17-year-old Western Hills High School student and cheerleader.

In the early morning of February 17, 1974, Walker was sitting with her boyfriend, Rodney McCoy, in his car in the parking lot of Brunswick Ridglea Bowl after attending a dance at Western Hills High School. The car door suddenly swung open and the two were assaulted by an unknown man, who dropped the magazine from his gun during the attack. McCoy was pistol-whipped and rendered unconscious. His last memory of the incident is Walker being grabbed and taken by the unknown male, whom he described as a white man, about 5 feet 10 inches tall, as she screamed for help. Walker was nowhere to be seen after McCoy regained consciousness. McCoy immediately went to Walker's house to inform her parents of the incident.

The police were called, and they searched the area where she had been abducted. Her purse and the magazine were the only items recovered in the parking lot. On February 20, 1974, her body was found in a culvert in Lake Benbrook. The autopsy revealed that Walker had been alive for 2 days following her abduction, and she had been beaten, tortured, raped, and strangled to death. Toxicology reports also showed she had been injected with morphine. The police had identified several suspects during the initial investigation. Police obtained samples of bodily fluids from the crime scene, and Walker's dress and other clothing were preserved. However, adequate technology to use such evidence to identify the killer did not exist in the 1970s. A mysterious letter by a person claiming to know the killer was among the few pieces of evidence received and released by the police department.

== Police investigations ==
The murder remained a cold case for 46 years until September 2020, when DNA evidence recovered from Walker's clothing was sent to Othram Inc., which specializes in degraded DNA samples; the Oxygen network paid for the testing. Leads from Othram and a follow-up investigation by Detectives Leah Wagner and Jay Bennett led to the identification of 77-year old Glen Samuel McCurley as a suspect in the crime.

McCurley had been interviewed by police shortly after the murder, as he had purchased a .22 Ruger pistol that used the same magazine as the one dropped in the parking lot of Brunswick Ridglea Bowl, but he had claimed the gun had been stolen from his truck. McCurley agreed to take a polygraph test and, after he passed it, was eliminated as a suspect.

In 2020, police obtained DNA samples from the trash receptacle outside McCurley's home. After confirming that the sample matched the suspect's DNA, investigators interviewed McCurley, who agreed to provide a cheek swab. The matching of the samples were enough evidence to arrest and charge him with the crime.

McCurley went on trial in August 2021. The evidence presented in court included the .22 Ruger pistol that McCurley had claimed was stolen in 1974, which had been found concealed inside his home. On the third day of the trial, McCurley changed his plea to guilty and was sentenced to life in prison. Until 2022, he didn't admit to killing Walker, telling reporter Skip Hollandsworth that he pleaded guilty because, “I'd had enough hounding." Investigators believe McCurley may have been involved in the rapes and murders of several other young women in the Fort Worth area in the 1970s and 1980s, although he was never charged with any additional crimes. McCurley was imprisoned in Gib Lewis Unit and would have been eligible for parole on March 21, 2029, but he died on July 15, 2023.

== See also ==
- Fort Worth Missing Trio - Unsolved case from the same year and city
- Disappearance of Michaela Garecht - Previously thirty-two-year-old unsolved case
- List of solved missing person cases (1970s)
- Murder of Reyna Marroquín - Previously thirty-year-old unsolved case
