= Ana Teresa Diego =

Argentine astronomy student

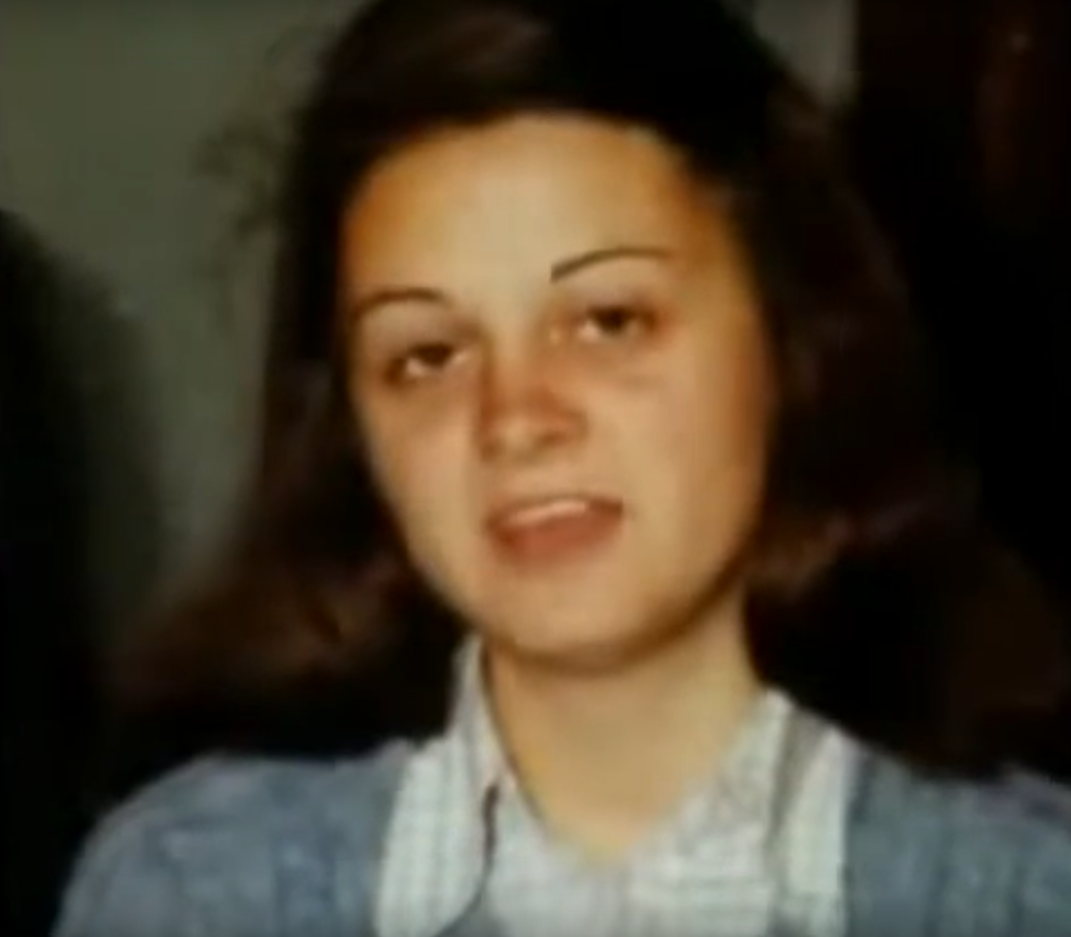
- Ana Diego in 1972
- Born: 5 November 1954; Bahía Blanca, Argentina
- Disappeared: 30 September 1976
- Died: 1976 (aged 21–22)
- Cause of death: Extrajudicial killing
- Education: National University of La Plata
- Occupation: Student
- Known for: Being forcibly disappeared and murdered by the 1976 Argentinian military dictatorship

Ana Teresa Diego (5 November 1954 – d. 1976) was an Argentine student of astronomy who was forcibly disappeared by the military dictatorship of Argentina during the Dirty War on 30 September 1976. In 2012, her body was identified. The asteroid 11441 Anadiego now bears her name.

== Background ==
Diego was born in 1954. She graduated from the La Plata Astronomical Observatory as an undergraduate in the 1970s. She studied astronomy at the National University of La Plata. In 1975, her father, a mathematician working at the Universidad Nacional del Sur whom militants remembered as "one of the first professors in whom the Bahian student movement could trust," was killed.

== Disappearance ==
In 1976, Diego was kidnapped and summarily killed by the Military Junta of Argentina in the area of El Bosque de La Plata for her membership in the Communist Youth Federation (Argentina). While Diego was leaving the Communist Youth Federation facility in the El Bosque area of La Plata at noon, 30 September 1976, she was attacked and abducted by a gang of men that got out of two Fiats without license plates. Before being placed in one of the cars, she shouted her name for witnesses of the assault, and her apartment was raided by her assailants. On two occasions, Diego was seen in detention at the Pozo de Arana and the Brigada de Quilmes, both facilities controlled by Ramón Camps.

In May 2012, after years of searching, the Argentine Forensic Anthropology Team identified Diego's remains. They had been buried in a mass grave.

== Legacy ==
Diego's mother, Zaida Franz, was a founding member of the Mothers of the Plaza de Mayo and participated in the first meetings of family members in Bahía Blanca of the disappeared and the movement's first Marches of the Mothers in La Plata.

In the inaugural speech for her second term, Argentine President Cristina Fernández de Kirchner remembered Diego and linked her to a photograph of future Brazilian President Dilma Rousseff's arrest, saying "Today Dilma occupies the chair of one of the most important countries in the world, maybe this young woman [Ana Teresa Diego] could have been sitting in the same place as I am."

An asteroid, 11441 Anadiego, is named after her.

== See also ==
- List of people who disappeared mysteriously: post-1970
- List of solved missing person cases (1970s)
