= Larry Ralston =

American serial killer and rapist

- Born: Larry M. Ralston; July 5, 1949 (age 77); Norwood, Ohio, U.S.
- Convictions: Aggravated murder (4 counts); Rape (2 counts)
- Penalty: Death; commuted to life imprisonment

Details
- Victims: 4–5+
- Span of crimes: 1975–1977
- Country: United States
- State: Ohio
- Date apprehended: November 15, 1977
- Imprisoned at: Madison Correctional Institution

Larry M. Ralston (born July 5, 1949) is an American serial killer and rapist who kidnapped and killed between four and five girls and young women in Ohio from 1975 to 1977. Originally sentenced to die in the electric chair, Ralston's sentence was later commuted to four life sentences with a chance of parole, although all of his applications have been denied.

== Background ==
Larry M. Ralston was born on July 5, 1949. Though not much was reported about his childhood, when Ralston was 17, he left Norwood High School and joined the Army, completing his high school education while in service. When he returned, Ralston did not have a job, and by the time of his 1977 arrest, he was living at his parents' house.

== Murders ==
On September 3, 1975, 17-year-old Linda Kay Harmon left home for school and planned to meet a friend, but never showed up. Later that day, Harmon's parents became wary after she failed to show up for a dental appointment. A month later, on October 5, Harmon's skeletal remains were found scattered across a 2000-foot area along Braun Road. Six months after her remains were found, her parents offered an award for information that lead to an arrest in the case.

On May 4, 1976, 22-year-old Nancy Grigsby visited the apartment of a friend. While there, she said she was going on a short walk, but she never returned. On November 16, 1976, Grigsby's decomposed body was discovered in a wooded area just off of Bucktown Road.

On June 30, 1976, the nude body of 21-year-old Mary Ruth Hopkins was found in a lover's lane near Five Mile Road in Anderson Township. Her face was badly bruised, some of her hair had been torn out, and a tank top was wrapped around her neck.

On January 15, 1977, 15-year-old Elaina Bear, along with her friend Debbie Whitt, went to a party. After it was over, the two decided to hitchhike home, and were picked up by a man who later dropped Elaina off near a tavern on Kennan Avenue. When dropping off Debbie at her home, the man asked her how far Elaina lived from Winton Place. The driver ultimately dropped her off and left her unharmed, but Elaina never returned home. Elaina's nude body was found face-down in a Clinton County creek bed. She was determined to have been strangled to death.

On July 17, 1977, 16-year-old Diane Sue McCrobie went on a date with her boyfriend. She never returned home, and her skeletal remains were found on October 22 in a bushy area near East Fork Reservoir.

== Arrest and trial ==
On September 24, 1977, three teenage girls reported being abducted by a man who drove them to a rural area and raped them. The area where the girls were raped was about 4 miles away from where the body of a young woman was found, and police, who were now probing the murders of 12 women in the area, guessed that the perpetrator was a local. On November 15, 1977, Ralston was arrested as a suspect in the rapes. Later that November, Ralston was charged with the murders based upon the discovery of his name in McCrobie's address book. He pleaded innocent during his arraignment.

The trial of Larry Ralston in Elaina Bear's murder began in April 1978. The jury was composed of six men and six women. Though some jurors said the defense put on a good case, they were ultimately swayed by Ralston's confession. On May 4, 1978, after more than seven hours of deliberation, the jury found Ralston guilty of killing Elaina Bear, and just over a month later, he was sentenced to death, with a scheduled execution date set for October 31, 1978. On July 6, 1978, Ralston was convicted of killing Diane McCrobie and was sentenced to life imprisonment. On July 26, his original death sentence was commuted to life imprisonment after the U.S. Supreme Court ruled that Ohio's death penalty was unconstitutional. On August 2, Ralston was convicted of killing Linda Harmon and was given a life sentence. On August 24, he was convicted of killing Nancy Grigsby and was given another life sentence. Finally, on September 25, Ralston pleaded guilty to two counts of rape, on the basis of which a month later he was sentenced to two concurrent 7-to-25-year terms.

== Aftermath ==
Over a year later, on November 7, 1979, Ralston's sentence for Grigsby's murder was overturned due to accusations the prosecution did not establish a cause of death. In February 1980, the Ohio Supreme Court dismissed the charge. In 1984, Ralston pleaded guilty to killing Mary Ruth Hopkins in 1976, for which he received another life sentence. In 1999, he became eligible for parole, though his request to be released was dismissed. In 2018, another bid for parole was denied. As of 2022, Ralston is still alive, currently imprisoned at Madison Correctional Institution.

== See also ==
- List of serial killers in the United States
