= Michael Carl George =

Executed American murderer and possible serial killer

- Born: 1957; Ohio, U.S.
- Died: February 6, 1997 (aged 39); Greensville Correctional Center, Virginia, U.S.
- Status: Executed by lethal injection
- Motive: Witness elimination
- Convictions: Capital murder Involuntary manslaughter Abduction with intent to defile Abduction; Robbery; Use of a firearm in the commission of felony
- Penalty: Death

Details
- Victims: 2–3
- Span of crimes: 1979–1990
- Country: United States
- State: Virginia
- Date apprehended: For the final time on June 17, 1990

Michael Carl George (1957 – February 6, 1997) was an American murderer, kidnapper, child molester, and possible serial killer who is best known for the sexually motivated kidnapping, torture, and murder of teenager Alexander Sztanko, which he committed after being released from prison on an involuntary manslaughter conviction relating to the similar death of another youth in 1979. His first victim's body has never been found, and after his final arrest, George reportedly confessed to killing a third victim who, if real, was never discovered. Convicted and sentenced to death for the Sztanko murder, he was executed in 1997.

== Early life and death of Larry Perry ==
Relatively little is known about George's life. He was born in 1957 in Ohio and moved with his parents to northern Virginia the following year. Three younger brothers were born in the family following the move to northern Virginia. Carl reportedly tortured animals while growing up. As he grew older, he started taking interest in young boys and was always in the company of young men.

On May 22, 1979, George lured 9-year-old Larry Wayne Perry away from his grandparents' home in Dumfries, whereupon he is believed to have killed him and buried his body in a ravine.

Initially, Perry's disappearance was not treated with urgency by police. After he failed to return home, Perry's family set out to search for him, but failed to locate him. George was first questioned about the case the day after Perry's disappearance, as he drove a blue/white Ford Bronco similar to the vehicle of a stranger who was last seen in Perry's company. George claimed he had briefly talked to the boy, but that he had no involvement in the disappearance.

Over the next few weeks, George offered to participate in the searches and even drove Perry's grandfather, John, around in his car. In later interviews, the grandfather noted that the car was spotless, that he had seen a gun in the front seat, and that he generally felt uncomfortable being around George. In the following two years, despite using sniffer dogs and asking George to undergo a polygraph test, results of which were inconclusive, they had no further leads in the case.

In August 1982, however, authorities received an anonymous tip that George was involved in Perry's disappearance, and not long after, he turned himself in and changed his story. In this version, he claimed that he and the boy had gone target shooting near the power lines between the I-95 and State Route 234. George claimed that he had placed his gun on the hood of the Bronco and got out to set some targets, and while his back was turned, Perry supposedly accidentally shot himself. Fearing that he would be arrested for murder, George left the area and returned later that night, where he dragged the body deeper in the woods, placed it in a ravine, and covered it with leaves and branches.

George was soon indicted by a grand jury on charges of murder, abduction, and failure to provide medical care to a minor, but as prosecutor Paul Ebert believed he would be unable to secure a conviction, he offered to make a plea deal with the defense. As a result, George pleaded guilty to involuntary manslaughter and abduction, and was sentenced to five years imprisonment for the manslaughter charge and a ten-year suspended sentence on the abduction charge. Ebert later claimed that the decision to make the plea deal was made due to the fact that they had no body or witnesses; their sole piece of evidence being George's confessions, and the fact that no case without a body had been successfully prosecuted in Prince William County at the time.

Despite attempts from state prison officials to keep George incarcerated as long as they could, denying him parole on at least two occasions, he was released after serving only two and a half years of his sentence due to good behavior and time served while awaiting trial.

== Murder of Alexander Sztanko ==
After his release, George returned to his native Stafford County, where he was hired to work as a computer operator. Over the following four years, his behavior turned drastically more violent and sexual, as he resorted to soliciting teenage boys to perform sexual acts and photographing unsuspecting youths. He is also said to have written stories containing fantasies of young boys being chased by evil creatures. Authorities in Stafford County also investigated him for a series of abductions of teenage boys, all of whom claimed that a "Rambo-like character" dressed in full camouflage gear kidnapped and dragged them inside the woods, where he handcuffed and tortured them with stun guns.

On June 16, 1990, 15-year-old Alexander Eugene Sztanko left his parents' home in Woodbridge to go trail riding with some friends. Along the way, he was abducted by George and dragged deeper into the forest, where he was handcuffed to a nearby tree. After this, George proceeded to sexually assault and torture Sztanko – this consisting mostly of cutting him with a machete on various parts of the body and beating him, but also included using the stun gun's electro shocks on his genitalia. Sztanko eventually began to cry for help, which prompted George to shoot him once in the head, killing him instantly. George left the body tied to the tree.

== Arrest, confessions, and investigation ==
George was arrested for trespassing the day after murdering Sztanko, claiming that he was hunting turkey. He was jailed, and a search was conducted of his house, where officers found loaded weapons, boxes of ammunition, $155 in cash, safes containing undisclosed papers, and numerous photographs of young teenage boys. Sztanko's body was found the same day by police, not far from the location George claimed he had buried Perry more than a decade prior. George was transferred to the Prince William-Manassas Regional Adult Detention Center, where he was held without bond on the charge of murder.

George denied committing the crime, but an examination of spent shell casings from the pistol recovered from his home conclusively established that it was the murder weapon. As a result, he was indicted for capital murder before a grand jury in August 1990. Virginia House delegate William J. Howell announced plans to file legislation classifying sexual assault and torture as capital crimes, as prosecutors could only seek a death sentence if they could prove George had stolen something from his victim. While awaiting trial, George confessed to his cellmate that he had shot Sztanko because he was screaming too loudly – the inmate later relayed this to the authorities. Later during the trial, testimony showed that George had stolen money, a dirt bike and tennis shoes from Sztanko, which made him eligible for the death penalty.

In October 1990, Paul Ebert, who was still employed as the commonwealth's attorney, claimed in both interviews and statements addressed to the courts that George admitted to killing Perry and Sztanko, and a third victim he would not name. Little is known of this purported third victim, aside from George's claims that he picked him up from a McDonald's in Woodbridge and that the killing had occurred within the last ten years. Despite inquiries from both Stafford and Prince William Counties into cold cases, accompanied by a separate investigation by authorities in Oklahoma City, Oklahoma, where George had spent some time, no case matched the one described by the accused. Because of this, George was not prosecuted for this alleged offense, and tried only for Sztanko's murder.

== Trial, imprisonment and execution ==
Due to the overwhelming amount of evidence against him, George was swiftly tried, convicted, and sentenced to death for murdering Sztanko. His original execution date was scheduled for mid-April 1993, but was rescheduled after he was granted a stay by the Supreme Court of Virginia to file another appeal. Both this and a subsequent appeal to the SCOTUS were denied.

George's execution was rescheduled for 1995, but was delayed yet again after he and his attorneys filed a motion to the Supreme Court arguing that prosecutors did not conclusively prove that he had killed Sztanko during the course of a robbery. The appeal was denied by a federal judge later that same year, and in 1996, a federal court upheld his conviction.

A third and final execution date for George was scheduled for February 6, 1997. This time, all of his appeals and motions were denied by the relevant courts, allowing his execution to proceed. Some newspapers remarked that this was one of the fastest proceedings since the state resumed executions in the 1980s – at the time, 15 of the 49 inmates on Virginia's death row had been imprisoned longer than George. On the aforementioned date, George was executed via lethal injection at the Greensville Correctional Center in Jarratt. He offered no final statement.

== See also ==
- Capital punishment in Virginia
- List of people executed by lethal injection
- List of people executed in Virginia
- List of people executed in the United States in 1997
