= John W. Hopkins =

Convicted American serial killer

- Born: June 3, 1953; Johnstown, New York, U.S.
- Died: March 11, 2000 (aged 46); Great Meadow Correctional Facility, Comstock, New York, U.S.
- Other names: "The Mohawk (Valley) Ripper" "The Johnstown Ripper"
- Convictions: Murder x2 Attempted murder x1
- Penalty: Life imprisonment x3

Details
- Victims: 3+ (2 convictions)
- Span of crimes: 1972–1978
- Country: United States
- State: New York
- Date apprehended: August 16, 1979

John William Hopkins (June 3, 1953 – March 11, 2000), known as The Mohawk Valley Ripper, was an American serial killer and kidnapper who raped and killed at least three women in New York's Mohawk Valley region from 1972 to 1978. Convicted for two of these deaths during his lifetime, he was given two 25-year-to-life terms, which he served until his suicide in 2000.

== Early life ==
John William Hopkins was born on June 3, 1953, in Johnstown, New York, with 2 brothers Jimmy and Donny along with a sister Nancy. Little is known about his childhood, but at some point during his adolescence, he expressed a desire to join the state police, but eventually gave up on the idea. According to friends and acquaintances of Hopkins, he enjoyed cruising along the New York State Thruway and stopping by college towns in his Chevy Nova, often wearing a cowboy hat and a military coat in an attempt to pass himself off as a trooper. Most concerningly, he appeared to have an unhealthy obsession with knives, often carrying several on his person in various knife sheaths.

== Murders ==
Hopkins' first confirmed victim was 19-year-old college student Joanne Pecheone, whom he abducted on January 12, 1972, while she was walking through an isolated wooded path towards her apartment in East Utica. He then bound and gagged Pecheone, cut off her bra with his knife, before raping and eventually stabbing her numerous times. As he was walking away from the crime scene, Hopkins was spooked off by a boy driving a snowmobile, who caused him to flee in the nearby woods. That same boy later found Pecheone's body, and quickly notified the authorities. One of the first responders to the scene, Lt. Raymond Pecheone, later had to be removed from the case, as it was discovered that Joanne was his niece. Despite eyewitness testimonies, Hopkins was not considered a suspect in her murder at the time, and Pecheone's death became a cold case.

On the night July 24 to 25, 1976, Hopkins passed by a donut shop in Gloversville, from where he abducted 17-year-old Cecelia Genatiempo. He then drove her to an isolated section of railroad tracks in Mohawk, where he subsequently raped and then stabbed her multiple times, before burying the body in a shallow grave. Genatiempo's decomposing body was found three months later by hunters who were passing by the area.

His final confirmed victim was 17-year-old Sherrie Ann Carville, a teenager from Johnstown whom he kidnapped from a bar in Johnstown on October 22, 1978. He drove her to his father's property, where he proceeded to rape and stab her multiple times, before leaving the body to rot in the field. It was discovered a year later, and another man, 32-year-old Albert J. Baird, was arrested for the crime after allegedly confessing that he was the one who had killed her. He spent six months in detention before authorities cleared him of suspicion.

== Arrest and confessions ==
On August 15, 1979, Hopkins abducted a 15-year-old girl from Northville, driving her to his house in Johnstown where he bound her hands between two attic posts and repeatedly raped her. On the next day, he drove with his victim to Palatine, where he intended to kill her. Hopkins shoved a sponge in her mouth to prevent her from screaming, knocked her on the head and then stabbed her in the back, but before he could finish her off, he was frightened off by a nearby logger who was marking trees for a harvest. After the rescue, she and the logger went straight to the police, quickly managing to identify Hopkins as her assailant. He was promptly arrested only hours later and driven to the police station in Loudonville, where, after a few hours of interrogation, he confessed to several violent crimes he had committed in the area over the years, telling the investigators that he was "ill and [requires] professional help". In his confessions, he admitted to killing Genatiempo and Carville, but for reasons unknown, did not reveal that he had also killed Pecheone in 1972.

== Trial, imprisonment and death ==
Following his confession, Hopkins was charged with the two murders and the attempted murder of the Northville girl, but it was decided that he would be tried separately for each. Shortly after being indicted for these crimes, Hopkins revoked his confession, with his attorney claiming that he had been forced into by policemen who had sicked a dog onto him. These claims did not convince the jurors, who subsequently found him guilty of second-degree murder, felony murder and kidnapping, after consulting for 90 minutes. On November 25, 1980, Justice Mario M. Albanese sentenced Hopkins to a 25-year-to-life term for the three charges, all of which were to run consecutively.

A few months into his serving his sentence at the Fishkill Correctional Facility, Hopkins was also charged with the kidnapping and murder of Carville, which he also denied committing. After less than a week, he was again found guilty, a decision met with joy by the victim's family members and with indifference from Hopkins himself. Like with the previous murder, Albanese gave the convict another 25-year-to-life sentence. In August 1981, he was yet again found guilty of the attempted murder at his third and final trial, receiving yet another 25-year-to-life sentence.

Two years later, Hopkins unsuccessfully attempted to appeal his murder convictions, but they were rejected by an appellate court. He remained incarcerated at the Great Meadow Correctional Facility in Comstock, New York until March 11, 2000, when he killed himself by slashing the back of his legs and wrists with a razor. In 2011, following a cold case review, the Oneida County District Attorney, Scott McNamara, acknowledged in a press release that police in Utica have closed the case of Joanne Pecheone, naming Hopkins as her killer. While pointing out that DNA evidence was inconclusive, McNamara noted that the similar modus operandi, eyewitness testimonies and footprints were exact matches to Hopkins. Following his identification, there have been speculations that he could have had other victims, with one prominent theory being that he killed 17-year-old college student Katherine Kolodziej in Cobleskill in 1974, but so far, authorities have been unable to link him to this or any other crimes.

== See also ==
- List of serial killers in the United States
