= Disappearance of Melissa Highsmith =

Melissa Highsmith
- Born: Melissa Highsmith; November 6, 1969 (age 56); Fort Worth, Texas, U.S.
- Other names: Melanie Miyoko; Melanie Walden

On August 23, 1971, 22-month old Melissa Highsmith, of Fort Worth, Texas, was abducted by a woman hired to babysit her. In November 2022, Highsmith, still living in the Fort Worth area, was identified through DNA testing, having been raised under a different name and having no knowledge she had been abducted.

== Background ==
Melissa Highsmith was born on November 6, 1969, to Alta Apantenco.

== Kidnapping ==
In August 1971, Melissa's mother, 22-year-old Alta Apantenco, placed a newspaper ad seeking a babysitter. On August 23, the woman she hired picked up Melissa from Apantenco's apartment, where Apantenco's roommate handed Melissa off. The babysitter never returned Melissa.

After being abducted, Melissa was raised under the name Melanie Miyoko. Although unconfirmed, Highsmith believes the woman who abducted her was also the woman who raised her. Highsmith said in May 2023 that she "didn't have a good life," and she ran away from home at age 15.

== Investigation ==
The investigation of Highsmith's disappearance went cold shortly after she was abducted.

In September 2022, an anonymous tip led to an investigation of a woman named Melanie Walden in the Fort Worth area. Highsmith's father reached out to Melanie through a private message on Facebook. A 23andMe DNA test and matching birthmark confirmed the woman, who was going by the name Melanie, as the missing Melissa Highsmith. Melissa also confirmed her identity after speaking to the woman who raised her. According to Highsmith's family, the initial DNA investigation was initiated by the family and was conducted privately, without police, but Fort Worth Police offered to conduct further DNA testing with the family if they wished.

Although the criminal statute of limitations expired on Highsmith's 38th birthday, police have said they will continue the investigation to "uncover all of the available information concerning Melissa’s abduction".

== Aftermath ==
In November 2022, Melissa Highsmith reunited with her parents and two of her siblings in Fort Worth. In the years after Melissa's abduction, Apantenco had four more children.

In May 2023, Fort Worth Police completed their own DNA testing, further confirming Highsmith's identity. That month, Highsmith legally reverted her name to Melissa, after living for decades under the name Melanie Walden.
