= Cowden family murders =

1974 mass murder in Oregon, United States

- Belinda and Richard Cowden
- Date: c. September 1, 1974
- Location: Copper, Oregon, U.S.; 42.0256°N 123.1442°W
- Type: Murder
- Outcome: Found deceased April 12, 1975; murders unsolved
- Deaths: Richard Cowden (28); Belinda Cowden (22); David James Phillips (5); Melissa Dawn Cowden (5 mos.)
- Suspects: Dwain Lee Little

Richard Cowden (born October 9, 1946), his wife Belinda June Cowden (born May 24, 1952), and their children, David James Phillips (born June 30, 1969) and Melissa Dawn Cowden (born March 19, 1974), disappeared from their campground in the Siskiyou Mountains near Copper, Oregon, United States, on September 1, 1974. Seven months later, in April 1975, their bodies were discovered approximately 7 miles (11 km) from their campsite. While law enforcement has suspected convicted killer Dwain Lee Little in their murders, their case remains unsolved.

The family's disappearance resulted in one of the largest search efforts in Oregon history, and their murders have been described as one of the state's most "haunting and baffling" mysteries. The case received nationwide attention at the time of its occurrence, and their murders have been profiled in numerous national media such as the New York Post and others. The murders were also the subject of a chapter in the book But I Trusted You (2009) by crime writer Ann Rule.

== Background ==
Richard Cowden (age 28), his wife Belinda (age 22), and their children David (age 5) and Melissa (age 5 months) were residents of White City, Oregon. Richard supported the family working as a logging truck driver.

The Cowden family made last-minute plans to camp near Carberry Creek in Copper, Oregon, over the Labor Day weekend, 1974. On August 30, the family, along with their pet Basset Hound, Droopy, arrived at a campground near the creek, an area they had frequented in the past. They parked their 1956 Ford pickup truck on Carberry Creek Road, a short distance from the campsite.

== Disappearance ==
=== September 1, 1974 ===
On September 1, 1974, Richard Cowden and his son, David, arrived at the Copper General Store at approximately 9:00 am, where Richard purchased milk. The two left the store on foot, heading towards their campsite. This was the last sighting of any of the Cowden family.

Later that evening, Belinda's mother, who lived less than 1 mile (1.6 km) from the campground, was expecting the family to come over for dinner on their way home. When they failed to arrive, she went to their campsite near the creek, but found nobody there; the family's belongings, however, were all present: A plastic dishpan full of cold water lay on the ground, while the keys to the family's truck as well as Belinda's purse were in plain sight on a picnic table. A diaper bag as well as the camp stove, fully assembled, were also in plain view, and the carton of milk Richard had purchased earlier that morning sat on the table, half-full.

Unable to locate her daughter, son-in-law, or grandchildren, Belinda's mother panicked when she noticed several items belonging to Richard lying on the ground: These included an expensive wristwatch as well as his wallet, which contained $21 (equivalent to $137 in 2025); she also found an opened pack of cigarettes, which she identified as being the brand Belinda was known to smoke. The family's truck, which was parked on the road, still contained their clothing, with only their bathing suits missing.

Belinda's mother left the campground to notify police, after which the sheriff, troopers, and the District 3 Office of the Oregon State Police arrived at the scene. Lieutenant Mark Kezar who headed the case later stated that the investigation had been "delayed for maybe a day" because of the lack of indication that anything violent may have occurred at the campsite. A state trooper, Officer Erickson, recalled: "That camp was spooky; even the milk was still on the table."

The following morning, the Cowdens' pet Basset Hound, Droopy, was found scratching at the front door of the Copper General Store.

=== Search efforts ===
The search investigation for the Cowden family was one of the largest in Oregon history, and included assistance from state and local police, numerous volunteers, Explorer Scouts, the United States Forest Service, and the Oregon National Guard. The U.S. Forest Service searched 25 miles (40 km) of roads and trails surrounding the campsite, and helicopters and planes were flown over the area equipped with infrared photography, which would detect recently overturned dirt. Despite massive search efforts, law enforcement was unable to find any evidence of a crime.

The Oregon State Police and Jackson County Police conducted interviews with over 150 individuals in their early investigation into the family's disappearance. A $2,000 reward (equivalent to $13,057 in 2025) was offered in exchange for information regarding the family's disappearance. With the impending hunting season, Richard Cowden's sister wrote a letter to the Medford Mail Tribune, pleading that hunters be alert to "anything that could be connected to a man, woman, a five-year-old child, or a five-month-old baby. Even though we try not to let our hopes dwindle that they will be found alive, we ask that you will even check freshly turned piles of earth. We will truly appreciate any clue or help that some hunter may find."

Over two-hundred citizens wrote to then-Oregon senator Mark Hatfield requesting that the Federal Bureau of Investigation begin looking at the case. The petition, however, was denied on the grounds that there was "no evidence that the Cowdens had been kidnapped or taken across state lines." At the time, there were a total of eight reported missing women in Washington and Oregon, and law enforcement attempted to seek a connection between these disappearances and that of the Cowdens (the disappearances of these eight women, however, were later linked to serial killer Ted Bundy).

=== Discovery of bodies ===
On April 12, 1975, two gold prospectors from Forest Grove, Oregon, were hiking through the woods near Carberry Creek when they discovered the decomposing body of an adult male tied to a tree on a steep hillside. In a small cave nearby, the bodies of an adult female, a child, and an infant were discovered. Positive identification of the bodies as those of the Cowden family was made via dental records. The location where the bodies were discovered was approximately 7 miles (11 km) from the family's campsite. (Note: The New York Post erroneously reported that the family was found 100 feet (30 m) from their campsite, which contradicts the research and records presented in Ann Rule's But I Trusted You (2009; ISBN 978-1-439-16054-1).)

Autopsies revealed that Belinda and David had died as a result of .22 caliber gunshot wounds; five-month-old Melissa had died from severe head trauma. Law enforcement suspected Richard Cowden died at the site of where his body was found, but were unable to determine a cause of death. It was surmised by investigators that Belinda and their two children could have potentially been killed elsewhere and subsequently concealed in the cave. Law enforcement searched the surrounding area for a murder weapon, but were unable to recover one.

== Investigation ==
Interviews were conducted with numerous persons who were at the campground on September 1. One family from Los Angeles had arrived at the campground at 5 pm that day. While walking in the park that evening, they witnessed two men and a woman parking nearby in a pickup truck; the father recalled: "They acted like they were waiting for us to leave, and frankly, they made us nervous—so we moved on."

Based on the location of Belinda's and the children's bodies inside the cave, Lieutenant Kezar suspected that the person responsible was a local resident who knew the area and was aware of the cave location. After the family's remains were recovered, a resident of Grants Pass who had volunteered in the search told police that in September he had searched the cave where Belinda and the children's bodies were found, and that they were not there at that time. To confirm he was referring to the same cave, law enforcement had the man escort them to the cave he had searched; it was the same cave where the bodies had been discovered.

=== Suspects ===
==== Dwain Lee Little ====
Law enforcement considered Dwain Lee Little of Ruch, who was 25 at the time of the family's disappearance, a suspect in their murders. Little had been paroled from the Oregon State Penitentiary in Salem on May 24, 1974, three months before the disappearance of the Cowdens. At 16, in 1964, he had raped and murdered teenager Orla Fay Fipps. State police were able to determine that Little had been in Copper over the Labor Day weekend at the approximate time the Cowden family disappeared.

Little's girlfriend told law enforcement that she had seen him with a .22 caliber gun during Christmas time 1974; on January 12, 1975, his parole was revoked after she informed police of his possession of a firearm. Little was paroled again on April 26, 1977. On June 2, 1980, Little picked up a pregnant 23-year-old named Margie Hunter, whose car had broken down near Portland, Oregon, and sexually assaulted and beat her. Hunter and her unborn child survived, and Little was charged and convicted of attempted homicide and sentenced to three consecutive life sentences.

Police later suspected that the two men and woman in a truck reported by the Los Angeles family at the campground were in fact Little and his parents, as their truck matched the description provided by the family. Little and his parents denied any knowledge of the Cowdens' disappearances; however, a miner who owned a cabin nearby claimed that Little and his parents had stopped by on Monday, September 2, 1974, and signed a guestbook he kept for visitors.

Rusty Kelly, an inmate who at one time shared a cell with Little, later claimed that Little confessed to the Cowdens' murders. Despite the "voluminous" circumstantial evidence, Little has never been charged with the murders of the Cowden family.

== See also ==
- List of homicides in Oregon
- Lists of solved missing person cases
- List of unsolved murders (1900–1979)

== Works cited ==
- Rule, Ann (2009). But I Trusted You, and Other Case Files. New York: Simon and Schuster. ISBN 978-1-439-16054-1.
