= Killing of Marilee Bruszer =

American murder victim identified after 37 years

Marilee Bruszer
- Undated photograph of Bruszer
- Born: Marilee Lee Bruszer; November 4, 1944; California, United States
- Disappeared: August 22, 1978
- Status: Remains identified after 37 years
- Died: c. August 1978 (aged 33)
- Cause of death: Homicide by strangulation
- Body discovered: September 3, 1978; Juab County, Utah, United States
- Other name: Juab County Jane Doe
- Known for: Formerly unidentified victim of homicide

Marilee Lee Bruszer, previously known as Juab County Jane Doe, was a formerly unidentified American murder victim who was found on September 3, 1978. Bruszer's body was not identified until August 2015, 37 years after her discovery, due in part to inaccurate estimates of her age and physical characteristics, and also due to the long distance between the site of her disappearance in California and the discovery of her remains in Utah. The exact circumstances of her death remain unknown.

== Circumstances ==
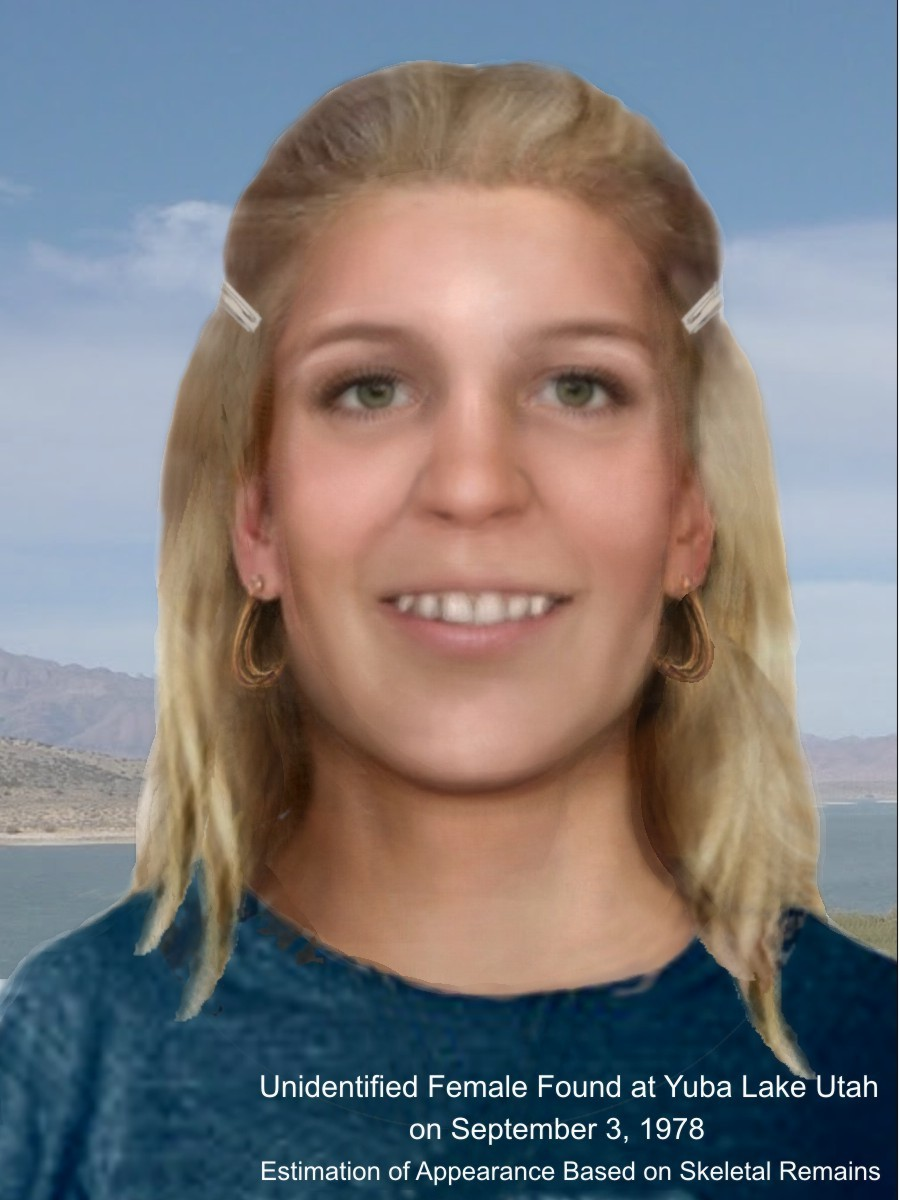
Reconstruction of Bruszer

Bruszer went missing on August 22, 1978, from Long Beach, California. Few details were available about her case, although authorities did believe she had been murdered and classified her as "endangered missing." Further into the investigation, her dental records and DNA information were obtained to compare against unidentified bodies in the country. According to record, she was declared legally dead on August 22, 1983.

On September 3, 1978, the naked remains of a woman were found near the Yuba Lake campground in Juab County, Utah by three women who were fishing near the Yuba Dam. She was white and believed to have been five feet two to three inches (157 to 160 cm) tall at a weight around 110 pounds (50 kg), which was reported to be inconsistent with Bruszer's height and weight at five feet five inches (165 cm) and 145 to 150 pounds (66 to 68 kg), respectively. The victim was said to have light blond hair that was eleven inches (28 cm) long, although some sources state that it was brown, strawberry blond or sandy blond. Her natural hair color was likely light brown, as some pubic hair was found. With the body, a double-hooped earring was found along with a white barrette. She had some dental crowding, which caused one of her front teeth to be crooked. The woman was believed to be between eighteen and twenty-two when she was strangled several months to three years before her body was found. The age and time of death of the victim are now known to have been inaccurate, as Bruszer was thirty-three at the time she disappeared a month before the remains were found.

Henry Lee Lucas confessed to the victim's murder, although most of his admissions are now believed to have been coerced or otherwise unreliable.

== Identification ==
Early into the investigation, it was speculated that the victim was one of four missing women from the area: Nancy Wilcox, Susan Curtis, Debra Kent and Nancy Baird. Later, these women were eventually eliminated as potential identities after x-rays of Juab County Jane Doe's teeth were compared to their dental records. Baird, Curtis and Wilcox remain missing and have never been located.

A detective was looking through the evidence locker at the Davis County Sheriff's Office in 2013 when he came across some hair marked "Hair from Yuba Lake body." This was attributed to retired Davis County Sheriff's Captain Kenny Payne formerly working there as well as the state medical examiner's office at the same time and misplacing the evidence. The detective sent it off to Juab County soon after.

The Juab County Sheriff's Office secured a sample of this evidence and had it sent to Texas for testing in 2014. There, a DNA profile was generated and entered into the national database of missing people resulting in a familial match with two of Bruszer's family members who had submitted their DNA in the hopes of locating her. On August 22, 2015, the Long Beach Police informed the relatives that Bruszer had formally been identified.

== See also ==
- List of solved missing person cases
