= Who Killed Jane Doe? =

American true crime TV series (2017–2018)

- Starring: Various
- Narrated by: Kevin Conway
- Country of origin: United States
- Original language: English
- No. of seasons: 2
- No. of episodes: 12

Original release
- Network: Investigation Discovery
- Release: February 21, 2017 – February 27, 2018

Who Killed Jane Doe? is an American true crime television series on Investigation Discovery. It features cases of formerly unidentified women and the investigation process of finding their killers. The episodes also detail the circumstances of each subject's disappearance and life before she lost contact with family members, and lead up to the connection or match between the missing individual and the unidentified remains. The program was cancelled in 2018.

== Episodes ==
Each season consisted of six episodes, each documenting one Jane Doe case.

=== Season one ===
Episode	Case	Airdate	Summary
"Scarlett Doe"	Margaret "Margie" Calciano	February 21, 2017	In 1984, an attractive red-haired woman is discovered in Pennsylvania. The mother of Margie Calciano fears for the safety of her daughter when she vanishes after the pair have a fight.
"Girl Gone West"	Brenda Gerow	February 28, 2017	In 1980, 20-year-old Brenda Gerow leaves her family to travel to Arizona with boyfriend John "Jack" Kalhauser. She later calls her brother to announce plans to return, yet she never does. Meanwhile, a young woman's body is recovered in Pima County, Arizona in early April 1981. Authorities are stumped, as the victim, killed by ligature strangulation, could have come from anywhere.
"The Lady in the Woods	Cynthia "Cindy" Vanderbeek	March 7, 2017	In May 1995, a woman's body is found hidden in the bush off of a roadway in Pennsylvania, wearing a unique t-shirt. Meanwhile, Cindy Vanderbeek's relatives become suspicious when she fails to visit them and is absent from her godson's baptism.
"The Girl in the Gulf"	Amy Hurst	March 14, 2017	A decomposed body is discovered in the Gulf of Mexico. She is wrapped in a comforter and is completely unrecognizable. Amy Hurst's family, including her children, wonder what happened after she left their home to live with her husband in Florida.
"Her Wispering Bones"	Pamela "Pam" Knight	March 21, 2017	The skeletal remains of a woman are found in a wooded area. Pam Knight's three sons wake up one morning in 2005 to realize that their mother has abandoned them when she should have been present for one of the brothers' birthday.
"Runaway Jane"	Michelle Busha	April 4, 2017	In 1980, a decomposed body of a young woman is discovered, brutally murdered, in Blue Earth, Minnesota. Michelle Busha's father hopes to hear from his 18-year-old daughter after she leaves his residence after he confronts her over her rebellious behavior.

=== Season two ===
Episode	Case	Airdate	Summary
"The Tent Girl"	Barbara Taylor	January 23, 2018	A woman's remains are discovered wrapped in canvas in May 1968. Todd Matthews, later co-founding The Doe Network, is fascinated with the tale of his wife's father discovering the remains of the unidentified female and won't rest until it's solved.
"A Girl Has No Name"	Jovita "Vita" Collazo	January 30, 2018	A skeleton is found in Apple Valley, California in 1994 with little clues to her identity. Vita Collazo's estranged husband travels to California to reconcile with his wife and daughter, Michelle. Vita disappears and Michelle is forced to hide a deep secret about her mother's new boyfriend.
"The Doe in the Desert"	Danna Dever	February 6, 2018	A badly decomposed body of a woman is found in California in 1996. Danna Dever vanishes from her residence before she is due to testify against her abusive common-law husband.
"The Doe in the Woods"	Martha Jane Wever	February 13, 2018	The scattered remains of a middle-aged woman are found in a wooded area in Florida, her skull bearing the marks of gunfire. Former neighbors of Martha Jane fear the worst when their friend doesn't show up for a planned visit after moving to Kentucky with a childhood friend who later became a significant other.
"The Disappearing Doe"	Deanna Criswell	February 20, 2018	In 1987, a transient girl's body is found under a culvert in Pima County, Arizona. Deanna, a chronic runaway, loses contact with her sister after taking a bus to Arizona to meet her much older boyfriend, Bill Knight.
"Daughter, Sister, Diamond, Doe"	Nanda Gutierrez	February 27, 2018	A woman's remains are found at the roadside in Oklahoma. A mother searches for clues after her daughter leaves the home of her shady boyfriend, who gives little clues to her whereabouts.

== See also ==
- Forensic Files
- Cold Case Files
- Unidentified decedent
