= The Skeleton Crew (book) =

2014 true-crime book about internet sleuthing

The Skeleton Crew: How Amateur Sleuths Are Solving America's Coldest Cases
- Author: Deborah Halber
- Language: English
- Genre: Non-fiction, True crime
- Published: July 2014 (Simon & Schuster)
- Publication place: United States
- Media type: Print (hardcover), eBook, Audiobook
- Pages: 304 pp (first edition)
- ISBN: 9781451657586

The Skeleton Crew: How Amateur Sleuths Are Solving America's Coldest Cases is a 2014 non-fiction work that was written by Deborah Halber. It was first published on 1 July 2014 by Simon & Schuster and details the phenomenon of citizens creating and using Internet resources to identify unidentified human remains.

In the book, Halber gives firsthand accounts of her interactions with amateur web sleuths, the background of websites such as the Doe Network and an exploration of the issue of the unidentified in the American medicolegal system. She discusses the history of the science of identification and the use of the Internet for forensic crowdsourcing.

== Synopsis ==
The book covers the following topics:

- An overview of the Department of Justice survey to document the unidentified in America
- The history and sociology of potters fields
- The use of forensic reconstructions on public web sites
- The history of Las Vegas Unidentified, the first official public web site featuring the unidentified
- The identification of Tent Girl, an unidentified victim discovered in Kentucky in 1968
- Ongoing efforts to identify the Lady of the Dunes, an unidentified victim discovered in Provincetown, Mass., in 1974
- How DNA analysis methods developed in response to 9/11 subsequently helped identify Jane and John Does
- Personal stories of web sleuths who became instrumental in cold case identifications
- A discussion of law enforcement culture in relation to the public
- The future of forensic crowdsourcing

== Inspiration ==
In an interview on NPR's On the Media, Halber told the host Brooke Gladstone that her interest in the subject was sparked suddenly. Halber said, "I came across a photo in the Boston Globe — I think it was 2010 — and this woman was just really stunning — sort of auburn hair and these really beautiful eyes and this kind of Mona Lisa smile — and then I realized this wasn't a photograph. It was a reconstruction of a woman who had been brutally murdered in Provincetown, Massachusetts in 1974. And they still didn't know who she was. I ran to my computer and started Googling, and I realized that hers was far from an isolated case. That there were, by one estimate, 40,000 sets of human remains scattered around the country, literally stowed in the back rooms of morgues, bones in cardboard boxes, people who had been buried in potters fields. And this struck me as an enormous case of national neglect."

== Reception ==
Critical reception for The Skeleton Crew has been positive, and Discover listed it as one of the "best reads for July and August" in 2014. The Wall Street Journal and Boston Globe both praised the work, and the Wall Street Journal remarked that Halber "superbly reports" on the new subculture of "armchair detectives". Maclean's noted that Halber covered the early days of amateur web sleuthing and that "her bang-on descriptions and recondite details are riveting".
