= Murder of Tammy Vincent =

Formerly unidentified murder victim

Tammy Vincent
- Reconstructions of Vincent prior to her identification compared with an actual photograph (bottom right)
- Born: Tammy A. Vincent c. 1962; Tulsa, Oklahoma
- Disappeared: September 10, 1979; Seattle, Washington
- Died: September 25, 1979 (aged 17); Tiburon, California
- Cause of death: Homicide by stabbing, fire and firearm
- Body discovered: September 26, 1979
- Resting place: Ephrata Cemetery, Washington, United States (formerly Valley Memorial Park, Novato, California)
- Citizenship: United States

Tammy A. Vincent was a teenage runaway who was murdered in September, 1979. Her body was not identified until 2007, twenty-eight years after her death. It was previously believed she may have been a victim of the notorious Green River killings. Vincent's case has not been officially solved.

Vincent was from Okanogan County, Washington, who found work as a prostitute in Seattle. In August 1979, she was arrested by the local vice police. She agreed to testify against her employers in a prostitution and racketeering case. A lawyer delivered her back to her employers, and they relocated her to San Francisco. She was murdered in September 1979. She was reportedly last seen alive in the company of an unnamed man wearing a leisure suit. Two weeks after leaving Seattle, her body was discovered in a beach located in Tiburon, California.

== Circumstances ==
Tammy Vincent grew up on a farm in Okanogan County, Washington roughly 140 mi (230 km) northeast of Seattle. She was described as a headstrong girl with an adventurous streak. In her teenage years, Vincent fought with her parents, often running away from home and disappearing for weeks at a stretch.

Vincent left home in the fall of 1978, ending up in a foster home in Spokane. She then worked as a prostitute in Seattle. In August 1979, she was picked up during a vice police raid along with several others. In exchange for immunity, she agreed to give testimony in the prostitution and racketeering case against her employers - five men who were under investigation in King County, Washington for operating businesses which were fronts for prostitution and "tease and rip joints".

Two days after the raid, she was relocated from SeaTac to Spokane in an attempt to keep her safe, but a lawyer working for the five defendants tracked her down and turned her over to his clients. She was last seen in Seattle on September 10, 1979, at a motel in the 19200 block of Aurora Avenue North, getting into a silver Lincoln Continental owned by one of her employers. One day later, a King County Superior Court judge signed a protective order that identified Vincent as a material witness and ordered her held to testify in the case against her employers. She never showed up in court.

The last time her family saw her was in the summer of 1979, when she arrived at the family home in a car with someone else. Her family last heard from her that summer when she called, expressing fear for her life and a desire to return home.

It is believed that Vincent was driven to California and put to work at the Palace Theater in San Francisco's Tenderloin District. A salesclerk at a Woolworth's near the Palace Theater remembered seeing a girl who matched Vincent's description on the evening before the murder. With the girl was a man described as Caucasian and wearing a white leisure suit. The salesclerk told police that the man bought acetone, paint, and an awl.

== Murder ==
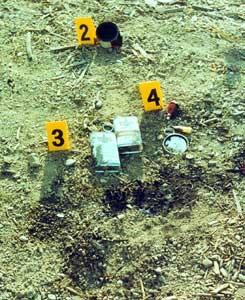
Crime scene where Vincent's body was located

A group of joggers discovered the body on the morning of September 26, 1979, on a beach at Blackie's Pasture in Tiburon, California. There was gravel embedded in Vincent's face, suggesting she may have been knocked down in a nearby parking lot. Her attacker began with an awl, inflicting 43 stab wounds in Vincent's chest and back as she tried to escape. The killer then doused her with paint and acetone, and set her on fire, burning her face beyond recognition. Vincent was still alive, however, and even got up and ran 20 ft (6.1 m) across the beach before collapsing.

Vincent was then shot once, fatally, in the back of the head. A witness reported seeing a bonfire on the beach shortly after 3 a.m., then a blue van speeding away. An awl, two containers of acetone, and a can of black paint were left at the crime scene, as well as a cigarette lighter. A nearby receipt indicated that the awl, solvent containers, and paint had been purchased the night before from a Woolworth's in San Francisco.

Upon the discovery of the remains on the beach, examiners could not identify the body, and could only determine her eye color, height, weight, gender, and dental characteristics. At the time of death, she wore a black shirt, beige pants decorated with blue and red, and high heels.

== Identification ==
In efforts to identify Vincent, the body was exhumed in 2002 and was transported to Richmond, Virginia for further examination. The Center for Missing and Exploited Children created a composite image from her skull, which has been done on countless other unidentified decedents. Various other reconstructions have been created prior to the work done by the Center for Missing and Exploited Children. In 2007, DNA samples from Vincent's mother and sister were matched to the DNA of the remains.

Because Vincent's head was severely burned, detectives were unable to collect hair samples; instead, hair from the pubic region was used to carry out the DNA test. She was cremated on August 7, 2007 and was laid to rest by her family later that month. Her ashes were flown from California to her family in Washington by detective Steve Nash, who had worked on the case since 2001.

== See also ==
- List of solved missing person cases: 1950–1999
- List of unsolved murders (1900–1979)
- Murder of Anjelica Castillo, where the victim went 22 years unidentified
- Barbara Ann Hackmann Taylor, who went 31 years without identification
- Murder of Tammy Alexander, unidentified for 35 years until January 2015
