= Disappearance of Trudy Appleby =

1996 disappearance in Illinois, U.S.

- Appleby c. 1996
- Born: Trudy Leann Appleby; September 4, 1984
- Disappeared: August 21, 1996 (aged 11); Moline, Illinois, U.S.
- Status: Missing for 29 years, 9 months and 13 days
- Height: 4 ft 8 in (142 cm)

On August 21, 1996, 11-year-old Trudy Leann Appleby was abducted from the driveway of her home by an unidentified person in Moline, Illinois. Several persons of interest have been identified by law enforcement in relation to the case but Appleby has never been located.

== Life and prior events ==
Appleby was born on September 4, 1984, to father Dennis Appleby and mother Brenda Gordon.

== Disappearance ==
Appleby spent the day prior to her abduction with friends, inline skating in front of homes in the neighborhood. At around 8:00 p.m., a friend of Appleby's walked her to the driveway of her residence. She was seen again in her driveway at around 9:30 a.m. the following morning and entering a box-type vehicle with an unidentified male, but wasn't seen for the remainder of August 21. Appleby's father initially believed that she was with her mother camping, but by evening had become concerned that she had been kidnapped.

== Aftermath ==
Since her disappearance, authorities have named three people as persons of interest. The first, William Smith, was named in 2017. He is believed to have been one of the last people to be in contact with Appleby prior to her disappearance; an investigation showed that Smith owned a vehicle similar to the one seen in the Appleby's driveway at the time of her disappearance and that the vehicle was likely scrapped a short time after the incident. The second and third persons of interest were named in August 2020 as David Whipple and Jamison Fisher; authorities stated that both men likely knew what happened during the disappearance. Smith died in December 2014, and Whipple died at his home in August 2022. In January 2021, a boat was seized in connection with her disappearance.

Appleby's abduction was logged in the National Missing and Unidentified Persons System as case number #MP2300, and in The Doe Network as case number 1533DFIL. The Doe Network classifies her disappearance as a "Non-Family Abduction". The True Crime Network profiled Appleby's case. In August 2024, community members gathered in downtown Moline and held a vigil for Appleby.

Jamison Fisher was arrested for the murder of Trudy Appleby in October 2025 and on November 20th, 2025 it was reported that Trudy Appleby was abducted by Fisher on account of a drug debt owed by her father, Dennis Appleby.

== See also ==
- List of people who disappeared mysteriously (2000–present)
