= Murder of Elizabeth Roberts =

Murder victim unidentified for 43 years

Elizabeth Ann Roberts
- Photo of Elizabeth Ann Roberts, taken shortly before she ran away from home.
- Born: Elizabeth Ann Elder; November 3, 1959
- Disappeared: July 25, 1977; Roseburg, Oregon, U.S.
- Died: August 9, 1977 (aged 17); Everett, Washington, U.S.
- Cause of death: Homicide (ligature strangulation)
- Body discovered: August 14, 1977
- Resting place: Pine Grove Cemetery, Hood River, Hood River County
- Other names: Snohomish County Jane Doe, "Precious Jane Doe", "Lisa"
- Known for: Unidentified victim of homicide for 43 years (identified June 2020) One of the first cold cases solved with DNA sequencing from hair
- Height: 5 ft 10 in (1.78 m) (approximate)
- Relatives: Dolly Roberts (adoptive mother), Troy Roberts (adoptive father), Tonya Roberts (sister), Stanley Elder (biological father), Mary Guignard (biological mother)

Elizabeth "Lisa" Ann Roberts (née Elder; November 3, 1959 – August 9, 1977), otherwise known as Precious Jane Doe, was an American homicide victim found near Everett, Washington on August 14, 1977, who was an unidentified decedent for 43 years until being identified on June 16, 2020. She had been picked up by a male driver while hitchhiking and killed after refusing sex. Her assailant had strangled her with a cord and then shot multiple bullets into her head, complicating identification. Roberts was a teen runaway who left her Oregon home in July 1977, less than a month before her murder. She was given the nickname "Precious Jane Doe" by Detective Jim Scharf, who began investigating the case in 2008. The detective was quoted as saying, "This young girl was precious to me because her moral decision from her proper upbringing cost her her life [...] I knew she had to be precious to her family too, so I had to find them. We needed to give her name back to her and return her remains to her family." Roberts was 17 at the time of her murder, though initial police estimations of her age were much older. Her body was found by blackberry pickers, and the medical examiner determined she had been dead for approximately 5 days before discovery. She was discovered fully clothed in a pastel tank top and denim cutoffs. As her identity remained unknown, Roberts' case was relegated as a cold case. In 2020, genetic testing via hair samples was used to locate her biological family, who led to her adoptive family.

== Background ==
Elizabeth Ann Elder was born November 3, 1959, to Mary Guignard and Stanley Elder in Hood River, Oregon. She was adopted by Troy and Dolly Roberts of Roseburg, Oregon at age 2. She was put up for adoption after her birth parents divorced, and her mother remarried and gave birth to two biological half-siblings of Roberts', Ken Christensen and Carol Holen. Roberts had 2 adoptive sisters, Tonya Roberts and Lynn Roberts. Tonya, who was 10 when Elizabeth disappeared, described her relationship with Elizabeth as "I looked up to Lisa as my big sister, who would spend time with me and play with me downstairs [...] we had a really good bond because we were both adopted." Roberts grew up in Roseburg, Oregon and attended Roseburg High School. Roberts was noted as having a strong interest in music and played the flute in her school band.

=== Disappearance ===
Roberts ran away from home aged 17 and 8 months in summer 1977, following a disagreement with her parents over a confiscated bag of marijuana. It was rumored the disagreement was over discovering she was adopted, which was refuted when her father stated she was already aware of her adoption. Her father reported her as a runaway to the Roseburg Police Department on July 25, 1977. Roberts called home several weeks after leaving, calling her mother from a payphone in Everett, Washington, asking her parents to send money. A check was sent to a branch of Seafirst Bank, which was never cashed. Roberts' parents asked her to come home, and she responded that she would think about it.

== Death ==
Roberts was last sighted 15 days after leaving home, on August 9, 1977. Roberts was seen by multiple people, thumbing for a ride as she walked south along Bothell-Everett Highway near Silver Lake. Roberts was picked up by 20-year-old David Martin Roth in his Chevy Nova, who had been headed towards the lake before encountering Roberts. Roth shared a beer with her and drove to a hidden spot near Mariner High School. Roth propositioned Roberts for sex, which she refused, saying that she wanted to go home. Roth offered Roberts a peacock feather, then strangled her with a bungee cord. Roth then dragged the body into the bushes, where he emptied 7 bullets from the clip of his .22 caliber rifle into her head, disfiguring her face.

Roberts' body was found by blackberry pickers on August 14, 1977, in brambles off the roadside in unincorporated south Everett. She had been dead for 5 days in the summer climate, and decomposition levels further obscured identification. Investigators determined the victim was 5'10, weighed 155 pounds, and had light reddish-brown hair. She carried no identification, purse, or driver's license, and was dressed in a pastel tank top with blue, green, and pink stripes, denim cutoffs, blue and white Mr. Sneaker brand tennis shoes in a boy's size 7, a Timex watch with a yellow face and a leather band which she wore on her left wrist. Her pants pockets contained 17 cents, an open pack of Marlboro cigarettes, and an empty plastic bag.

== Perpetrator ==
On August 13, 1977, 4 days after Roberts' murder, David Roth was arrested after police received a call about a different man waving a rifle in a park outside Gold Bar. On the way to the scene, officer Fred Vanderpool stopped Roth for a traffic violation on US route 2, and realized that Roth's Chevy Nova smelled of cannabis. The contents of the Chevy Nova included clips with 59 rounds, several bags of cannabis, a bundle of peacock feathers, and a loaded .22 caliber Marlin rifle. Roth was arrested briefly on a weapons charge and then released on August 15, 1977. Roberts' body had not yet been connected to Roth at this time.

On August 15, 1977, Roth confided in a friend that he had killed a hitchhiker. The friend called the police on August 29, 1977, and the police began to build a case against Roth. Roth was arrested at a Port Orchard apartment on January 18, 1979. He was tried and found guilty of first-degree murder on November 9, 1979, and sentenced to 26 years in prison. Roth was released in 2005, after serving his full sentence.

Roth returned to Everett, and in 2008, cold case investigators asked for his help in identifying the girl he had killed in 1977. Roth agreed to assist the investigation but continued to assert that he had not asked her name, which was standard practice for hitchhikers. Roth expressed regret over her death, quoted as saying, "I've always wondered how to alleviate someone's sorrow. I don't know what you can actually say to someone who you've killed their loved one [...] I think I would try to convince them I'm no longer the person that did that and I've learned to value life." He also expressed his wish to atone properly to her family. Roth died of cancer on August 9, 2015, 5 years before Roberts was identified.

Roth was the younger brother of convicted murderer Randy Roth, who killed his fourth wife in 1991 and is also suspected of killing his second wife in 1981.

== Investigation ==
=== Initial search ===
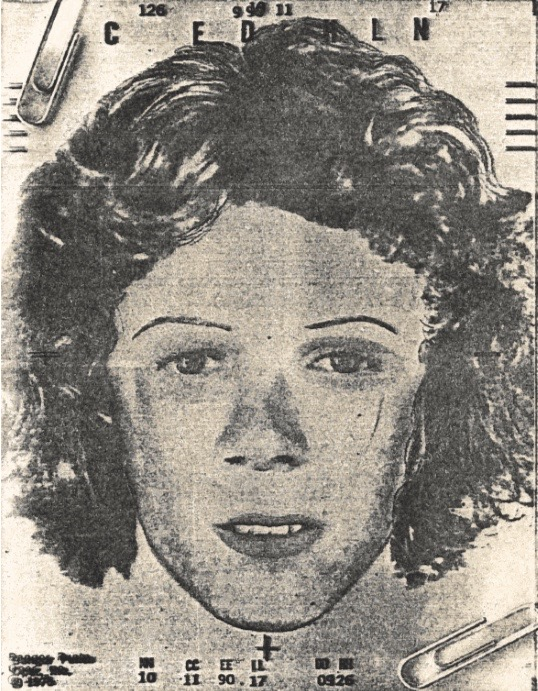
Original composite sketch by John Hinds of Precious Jane Doe

Even after confessing to her murder, Roth continued to state that he did not know his victim's name. By the time the victim's body was discovered, with a post-mortem interval of 5 days, she had decayed significantly enough to hinder identification. Initially, the remains were thought to be that of a 25 to 35-year-old woman, due to the victim's tall and lanky frame. Detective John Hinds drew a composite sketch of what he thought the Jane Doe would have looked like when alive. The sketch was released to newspapers, but no viable leads were generated, potentially due in part to the age estimate being much older than Roberts' actual age.

Meanwhile, Elizabeth Ann Roberts had been reported missing by her parents and classified as a runaway. However, until the Missing Children's Assistance Act went into effect in 1983, missing persons listings for runaways in the USA were removed from the National Crime Information Center system once the listed person reached age of majority, since the listed person was no longer considered an endangered dependant. 4 months after Roberts was reported missing, her 18th birthday arrived and her listing was wiped from the system. If her listing had not been removed from the system, it is theorized Roberts would have been identified much earlier.

After enough time had elapsed with no leads on identification, Jane Doe was buried at Cypress Lawn Cemetery in Everett, in a pauper's lot.

=== Continued search ===
Extensive efforts to identify Jane Doe began again in 2008, after The Doe Network inquired into the case. Cold case detective Jim Scharf took on the case. The victim's remains were exhumed in 2008 for testing and were examined by Dr. Kathy Taylor, State Forensic Anthropologist at the King County Medical Examiner's Office. A closer examination of the remains revealed that the victim was more likely a teenage girl, between the ages of 16 and 19. Because of this development, the National Center for Missing & Exploited Children began to assist with the case. In 2016, forensic artist Natalie Murry provided an updated composite sketch.

A University of Texas lab extracted a partial genetic profile from a femur. However, this profile received no hits in the Combined DNA Index System. The victim's bones had been boiled at some point in the past, significantly damaging the DNA and making it extremely difficult to extract a complete genetic profile. Since 2017, 4 other failed attempts have been made by different labs to capture a full genetic profile using the victim's bones.

== Identification ==
Roberts was identified on June 16, 2020. The identification was made by a team of 16 genealogists working on the case pro bono. Detective Scharf, who was still the lead detective on the case, had been on the case for 12 years when the identification was made. Snohomish County Medical Examiner Lead Medical Investigator Jane Jorgensen had been on the case for 3 years when the identification was made. The positive identification of Roberts was announced to the public on June 25, 2020, by Dr. Matt Lacy, Snohomish County Chief Medical Examiner. Her case is the oldest case of unidentified remains in Snohomish County to be solved with genetic forensics.

Roberts' case is notable for being one of the first cold cases in the world to be solved using DNA extracted from rootless hair. Due to the DNA of Roberts' bones being too deteriorated to successfully extract a complete profile, the profile was completed using new developments in rootless hair sequencing, methods pioneered by paleogenomics expert Dr. Richard "Ed" Green of the University of California, Santa Cruz. The hair used to identify Roberts was recovered from strands left on clothing of hers that had been kept in an evidence locker. Having never been buried, the DNA in the hair was of relatively good quality. Dr. Green managed to acquire Roberts' genetic profile using an algorithm he spent 2 years refining. He co-founded Astrea Forensics which now employs this technique and pipeline on other cases.

The team that identified Roberts was led by Barbara Rae-Venter and her Firebird Forensic Group, using public genetic genealogy websites. Upon taking over, Rae-Venter stated that there was no useful DNA in previous samples from the remains. Rae-Venter then called Dr. Green onto the case. After sufficient DNA had been extracted from the hair, Rae-Venter and her team turned to public genealogy websites such as Ancestry.com to search for matches that could prove a relationship, and from there lead to Jane Doe's identity.

After identification, Roberts' remains were exhumed again and sent to Hood River, Oregon, for a memorial service and burial in a family plot at Pine Grove Cemetery.

== See also ==
- Murder of Tammy Alexander
- Murder of Linda Pagano
- Murder of Margaret Fetterolf
- Murder of Michelle Garvey
- Cold case
- Crime in Washington (state)
- Forensic genealogy
- List of solved missing person cases: 1950–1999
- Unidentified decedent
