= Murder of Margaret Fetterolf =

Formerly unidentified 1976 murder victim

Margaret Fetterolf
- Born: December 27, 1959
- Disappeared: 1975; Alexandria, Virginia, U.S.
- Died: September 11, 1976 (aged 16); Woodlawn, Baltimore County, Maryland, U.S.
- Cause of death: Homicide by strangulation
- Body discovered: September 12, 1976
- Known for: Former unidentified decedent
- Height: 5 ft 6 in (1.68 m) to 5 ft 9 in (1.75 m)

Margaret Fetterolf (December 27, 1959 – September 11, 1976) was an American murder victim from Alexandria, Virginia, who was discovered on September 12, 1976, in Woodlawn, Baltimore County, Maryland. For 45 years, her body remained unidentified before being identified in September 2021 through DNA testing by the National Center for Missing & Exploited Children, Bode Technology, and Othram. Prior to her identification, she was known as "Woodlawn Jane Doe", in reference to the area of the county in which her body was found. The murderer, or murderers, have never been apprehended.

== Discovery of the body ==
On September 12, 1976, at 10:20 a.m., the body of a 15- to 30-year-old woman was found partially wrapped in a white sheet. She had been beaten, strangled, and raped. The rape had caused bleeding that had seeped into her clothing. She likely died at a different location and had been transported to the side of Dogwood Road near the back gate of a cemetery. It is possible that a Ford Econoline van may be linked to the case, as one was seen near the location of the body an hour before it was found.

The victim wore a turquoise-colored stone bead tied to a rawhide string as a necklace. Also in her possession were two brass keys (one believed to be for a house and the other for a "night latch") that were found attached to a safety pin in one of the pockets of a pair of tan-yellow jeans. She wore a white and tan shirt, a white bra, and distinctive knee-high socks with multi-colored stripes. A single, light tan moccasin with twine laces and a rubber sole was found near the body; it is believed to have been worn by the victim. Other pieces of cloth were also found on the body.

Two bandannas and a bag for grass seeds were found over her face. These had been fastened behind her neck in a square knot. One bandanna was blue and white, and the other was orange and white. The orange-and-white bandanna had holes cut in it to fit the locations of her eyes and nose. Besides the bag over her face, a piece of the grass seed bag was found in her throat. This was determined to have been the cause of her death, along with ligature strangulation. The bag read "Farm Bureau Association Grass Seed, Lexington, Mass." Additionally, her hands had been bound behind her back with some sort of "bandage" in noticeably high-quality knots.

An extremely large amount of a sedative drug, chlorpromazine, was found in the victim's stomach. Chlorpromazine is used to treat schizophrenia, which led to a theory linking the victim, or those responsible for her murder, to a mental institution. Additionally, the sheet that was wrapped around her body was consistent with those provided at inpatient institutions.

== Examination ==
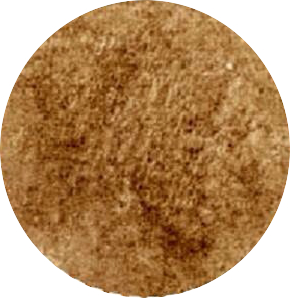
Tattoo found on the victim's right shoulder, possibly representing Jamaica Plain, Massachusetts

Examiners measured the victim and concluded that she weighed between 149 and 159 pounds and was 5 feet 6 to 5 feet 9 inches tall. The victim's blood type was determined to be O positive. There was evidence that she had been treated by a dentist. The victim had had three of her molars removed and had fillings in the remaining five. Because of the amount and quality of the dental care, authorities surmised that she did not come from an impoverished background. One of her other teeth was crooked.

A poorly tattooed pair of letters, possibly initials, was found on her left arm. It contained two letters, believed to be JP, SS, JB or a similar letter combination. She had her ears pierced and a scar on her upper right thigh. A widow's peak was noted on the victim's forehead.

She had wavy, dark brown to black shoulder-length hair and brown eyes and a dark olive complexion. The exact race and ethnicity of the victim puzzled investigators and medical examiners, although it was believed that she may have been white.

== Investigation ==
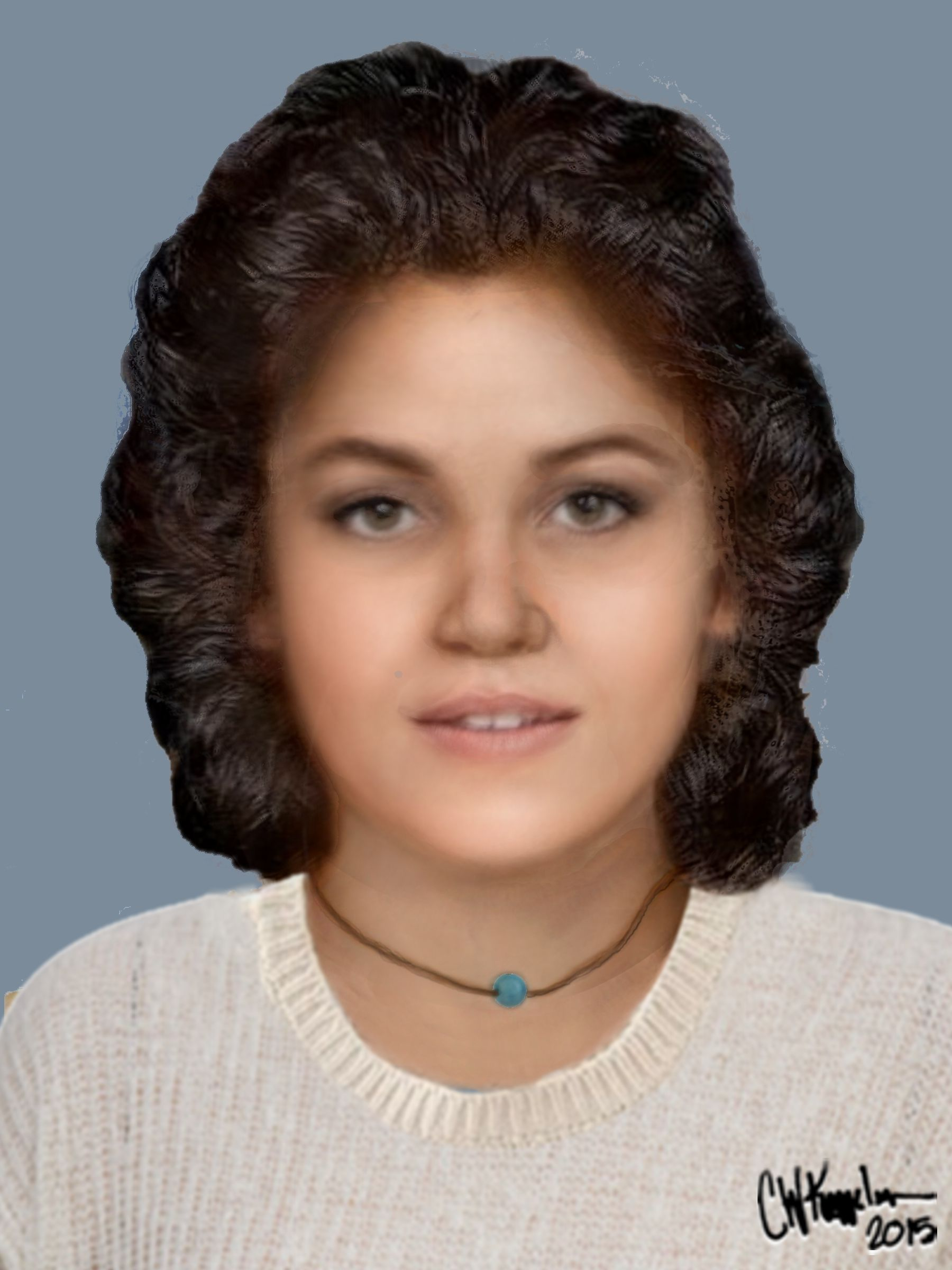
Reconstructions of Woodlawn Jane Doe by Carl Koppelman (left) and the NCMEC (right)

Shortly after the body was found, fingerprint and dental information were collected to establish its identity. Her fingerprints were added to national databases, as well as her dental chart. Various investigations were subsequently conducted in the case.

The victim has previously been linked to regions in Massachusetts and New York. Recent developments indicated she was possibly a teenage immigrant from Central or South America who had lived in Jamaica Plain, Massachusetts, although the family of the individual had yet to be located. In 2016, the National Center for Missing & Exploited Children released the detail that she may have used the names "Jasmine" or "Jassy" when alive.

Many missing women from across the United States have since been eliminated as possible identities for Woodlawn Jane Doe. The county police department offered a cash reward of two thousand dollars for information about this case. A notable case was that of Maria "Mia" Anjiras, a teen who had run away from her Connecticut home in February 1976.

The victim's face has been reconstructed multiple times for release to the public. Three versions exist that were rendered by the National Center for Missing & Exploited Children. Other sketches of her also exist. The local police department provided an age-regression and an additional reconstruction, created by Eve Grant, hoping to provide an estimation of her appearance at a younger age (in case she was "a runaway" or someone knew her at an earlier period of her life).

One of the keys which the victim carried was made in Fitchburg, Massachusetts and had "DB09212" stamped onto it.

The grass seed bag was connected to a factory in Buffalo, New York. It had been sold exclusively in the Massachusetts cities of Waltham, Rochdale, Lowell, South Weymouth, and Greenfield. Years before the murder, production of this type of bag had been halted.

Forensic pollen analysis of the items found with the body indicated she had spent time in a populous area, such as Boston, Massachusetts, or New York, New York. These results were aided by the detection of cedar and hemlock pollen, which possibly originated from a site such as the New York Botanical Garden or Harvard University.

The case has been featured on America's Most Wanted. Leads were processed but did not lead to the victim's identity or to that of her killer or killers.

A break in the case was announced in December 2015 by the National Center for Missing & Exploited Children after the Baltimore County police received a tip. A suitable match was discovered, being described as a Puerto Rican or Colombian teenager that had moved to Boston, Massachusetts with her parents and as many as five siblings. The explanation for the tattoo of "JP" on her arm was announced to possibly be the initials for a part of the city, known as "Jamaica Plain" where the possible match lived, on "Forbes Street." Potential school locations were also included. The department has had difficulties finding the relatives of the girl, putting the investigation on hold.

On the 40th anniversary of her discovery, the National Center for Missing & Exploited Children released an updated reconstruction of the victim.

== Identification ==
On September 15, 2021, after further DNA testing done with the assistance of The National Center for Missing and Exploited Children, Bode Technology, and Othram, detectives identified the girl as 16-year-old Margaret Fetterolf from Alexandria, Virginia. Fetterolf went missing in the late summer of 1975, and at the time of her disappearance was a student at Hayfield Secondary School. She was reported missing by her family one year before her body was found. An investigation continues into who was responsible for her sexual assault and murder.

== See also ==
- List of solved missing person cases (1970s)
- List of unsolved murders (1900–1979)
- List of murdered American children
- Murder of Elizabeth Roberts
