= Murder of Tammy Alexander =

American ex-unidentified 1979 murder victim

Tammy Alexander
- School portrait, circa 1978
- Born: Tammy Jo Alexander; November 2, 1963; Atlanta, Georgia, U.S.
- Disappeared: First half of 1979; Brooksville, Florida, U.S.
- Died: November 9, 1979 (aged 16); Caledonia, New York, U.S.
- Cause of death: Homicide (gunshot wounds to head and back)
- Body discovered: November 10, 1979; Off U.S. Route 20 in Caledonia 42.9174°N 77.7763°W (approximate)
- Resting place: Greenmount Cemetery, Dansville, New York, U.S. 42.543°N 77.681°W (approximate)
- Other names: Caledonia Jane Doe, "Cali Doe"
- Height: 5 ft 3 in (1.60 m) (approximate)

Tammy Jo Alexander (November 2, 1963 – November 9, 1979) was an American teenage girl who was found murdered in the village of Caledonia, New York, on November 10, 1979. She had been fatally shot twice and left in a field just off U.S. Route 20 near the Genesee River after running away from her home in Brooksville, Florida, earlier that year. For more than three decades, she remained unidentified under the names Caledonia Jane Doe or Cali Doe until January 26, 2015, when police in Livingston County, New York, announced her identity 35 years after her death.

Alexander was aged 16 when murdered, though her age was not clear to investigators at the time. Most potential forensic evidence was washed away by heavy rain on the night she died, but they knew she had come to the Caledonia area from a distant, warmer locale because she had tan lines on her upper body. Advances in technology allowed investigators to make use of improving forensic techniques to evaluate trace evidence they had collected and, following a successful DNA extraction from her remains in 2005 and a palynological analysis of Alexander's clothing, they concluded that she had spent time in Florida, southern California, Arizona, or northern Mexico prior to her death. Later analysis of isotopes in her bones would lend further support to this conclusion. In addition, a portrait was made of Alexander based on a facial reconstruction, in the hopes that someone would recognize her image, and it was uploaded to an online public database in 2010.

Identification was achieved based on a combination of factors; in 2014, a renewed search for Alexander by her half-sister and a close high school friend resulted in the filing of a new missing persons report with police in Hernando County, Florida, as she had not been seen or heard from since the late 1970s. Carl Koppelman, the artist of the reconstructed photo, notified the Livingston County Sheriff's Office about a potential match between the two pictures, and in 2015 a follow-up mitochondrial DNA (mtDNA) analysis confirmed a match with Alexander's half-sister based on the DNA results from 2005.

Alexander's case was well-publicized in the time she was unidentified, and Livingston County police continued to process thousands of leads from the public. The investigation stalled in 1980, leading county officials to arrange for her burial as "Unidentified Girl" at Greenmount Cemetery in Dansville, New York. In 1984, serial killer Henry Lee Lucas confessed to the crime, but his statement was not considered credible. The perpetrator remains unidentified.

== Background ==
Tammy Jo Alexander was born in Atlanta, Georgia, on November 2, 1963, and attended high school in Brooksville, Florida. Pamela Dyson, Alexander's half-sister, believes that Alexander left to escape a turbulent household. Dyson had a different father from Alexander, and, after about age 11, she lived with her paternal grandmother. According to Dyson, Alexander's biological father was not part of the younger girl's life; she grew up with their mother, Barbara Jenkins, and a stepfather. Their mother had become addicted to prescription medication and was emotionally volatile, erupting into temper tantrums. "She did prescription drugs," Dyson said of Jenkins. "She was suicidal. I think she had issues back then that they didn't diagnose."

Jenkins had worked as a waitress at a truck stop, and was joined by Alexander when she was a teenager. Alexander had a history of running away during this period. Her friend Laurel Nowell said that they had sometimes hitchhiked together with truckers, once traveling all the way to California together. When they got there, Nowell called her parents, and they paid for airline tickets for both girls so they could return to Florida. Jenkins died on January 17, 1998, at the age of 56. Her obituary had listed Alexander as deceased, which the family had assumed to be the case by that time.

Until the identification, Dyson assumed that her half-sister had made a new life somewhere away from her mother and stepfather. She had wished that it included a happy household, with a husband and children. "I thought she just wanted to go away and start all over," Dyson said.

=== Death and discovery ===
Alexander's body was discovered on the morning of November 10, 1979, by a farmer in Caledonia, New York, 23 miles (37 km) southwest of the city of Rochester. The farmer saw red clothing in one of his corn fields near the Genesee River and went to investigate, assuming that he had spotted a trespassing hunter. Instead, he found the body of a female teenager and notified police soon after.

Alexander was fully clothed and showed no signs of sexual assault. Investigators initially ruled that she had died from a severe hemorrhage caused by two gunshot wounds, one to the head over the right eye and one to the back. The wound to the head indicated she had apparently not turned or flinched, a common phenomenon of a headshot, and the entry wound suggested complete surprise. With her pockets turned inside out to indicate that any identification she carried had been removed, the investigators later named her "Caledonia Jane Doe" or "Cali Doe" as they worked to identify her.

The autopsy by the medical examiner indicated that Alexander had first been shot in the head while next to the road bordering the cornfield, at or near a blood spot found on the ground. She was dragged into the cornfield, where she was shot again in the back and left for dead. Heavy rains on the night of Alexander's death washed away a large portion of potential forensic evidence, such as physical and DNA traces of the perpetrator on her body and clothes.

== Investigation ==
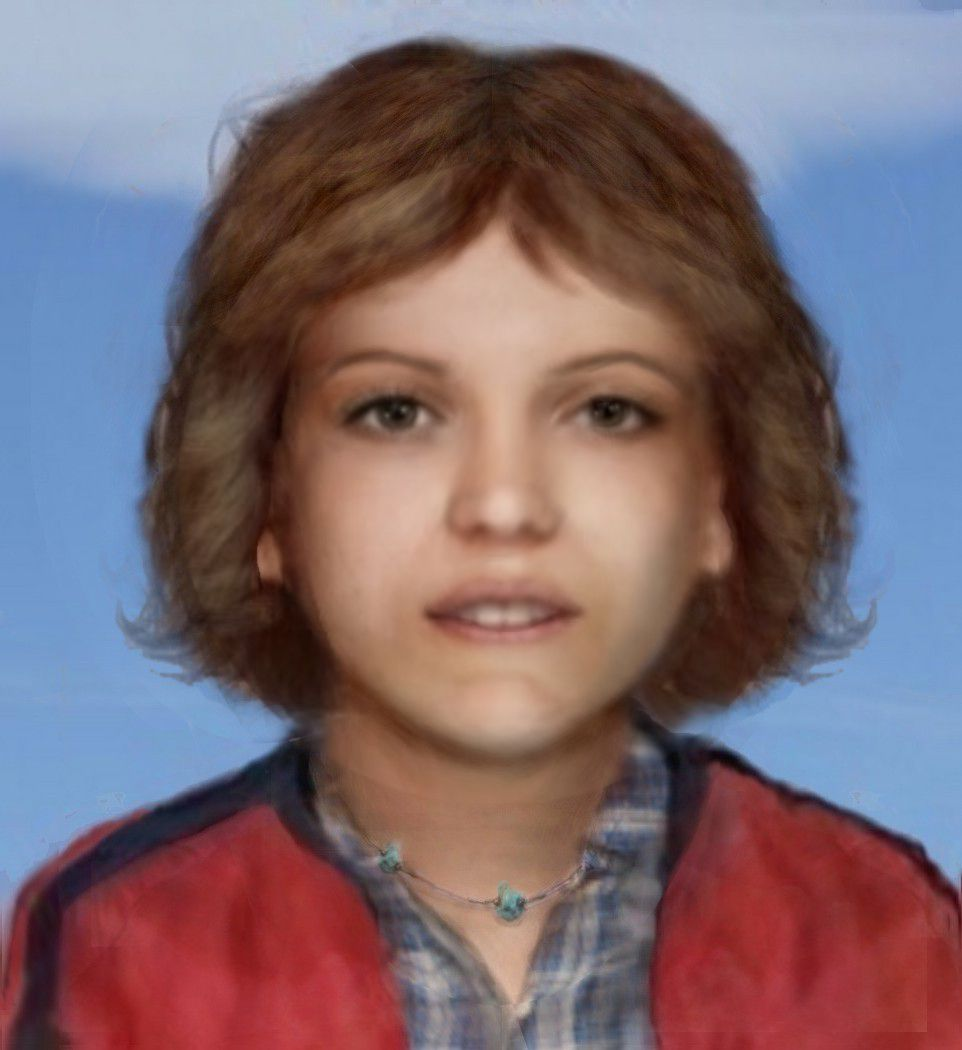
A facial reconstruction of Alexander that was made in 2010. The artist, Carl Koppelman, matched this to a real picture of Alexander (shown above).

In the 1980s, John York, who had been one of the first Livingston County deputy sheriffs on the scene in 1979, was elected sheriff. He served in the job until 2013, and ensured that the Cali Doe investigation remained active. Before she was identified, Alexander was estimated to have died between the ages of 13 and 19 (born sometime between 1960 and 1966). She was also estimated to be 5 feet 3 inches (1.60 m) and 120 pounds (54 kg). Alexander was described as having brown eyes and wavy, light brown shoulder-length hair that had been lightened in the front about four months prior to her death and was growing out, and her toenails were painted with coral-colored polish.

Alexander had visible tan lines from a halter top or bikini, indicating that she may have come from a region with abundant October–November sunshine, as sun tanning beds were uncommon in the 1970s and Upstate New York was not considered warm or sunny enough for such tanning during that period. There were freckles on the back of her shoulders and acne on her face and chest.

Alexander's teeth were in natural condition, with no restorations or fillings. It did not appear as if she had ever received dental care. Some of her permanent first and second molars suffered from severe dental caries (cavities and decay). Consistent with her young appearance, none of her permanent third molars (wisdom teeth) had erupted. Her blood type was A−.

Several hours before her death, Alexander had eaten sweet corn, potatoes, and boiled canned ham. This was possibly from a diner in nearby Lima, where a waitress had seen her eating with an adult man. At the time of exhumation, several of the victim's teeth were sent for mineralogical and forensic isotope analysis. The composition of her teeth could be linked to the composition and mineral content of regional drinking water supplies around North America, allowing investigators to determine where she may have been raised. Early results on the dental ^{18}O/^{16}O isotopic oxygen ratio indicated that she may have spent her early years in the south/southwest region of the United States.

Alexander was wearing a red nylon-lined men's windbreaker jacket with black stripes down the arms, marked inside with the label "Auto Sports Products, Inc.", a boy's multicolored plaid button-up shirt with collar, tan corduroy pants (size 7), blue knee socks, white bra (size 32C), and blue panties. She wore brown ripple-soled shoes. The red Auto Sports Products jacket was produced as a one-time promotional item and could not be traced after distribution. She also wore a silver necklace with three small turquoise stones. The necklace had a homemade appearance and resembled replica Native American jewelry made in the southwestern United States. Attached to her pants' front belt loops were two metal keychains, one shaped like a heart with a key-shaped cutout and inscribed with the words, "He who holds the Key can open my heart", the other shaped like a key meant to fit the cutout in the heart. The keychains were sold at vending machines along the New York State Thruway, leading investigators to conclude that she and her killer had traveled that route.

=== Pollen evidence ===
In 2006, forensic palynology was conducted on the clothing worn by the victim. Paul Chambers, a recently hired investigator in the Monroe County medical examiner's office, asked for and received permission to send her clothing to the palynology laboratory at Texas A&M University. Among the types of pollen found on the clothing by the Texas A&M researchers were grains from Casuarina (Australian pine, or "she oak"), Quercus (oak), Picea (spruce), and Betula (birch). The clothing pollen grains were compared to a control sample of pollen grains taken directly from the rural New York site where the body had been found in 1979.

Oak grows widely all over the U.S., and spruce and birch grow in New York, among many places in the country. But no oak, spruce, or birch pollen grains were found in the control sample, and neither spruce nor birch trees were found growing near the body dump site. The spruce and birch pollen on the unidentified body came from species common in mountainous areas of California.

Australian pine is an invasive genus of tree that grows in a limited number of locations in North America: south Florida; south Texas; parts of Mexico; the campuses of the University of Arizona and Arizona State University; and three regions in California: the North Bay of San Francisco, the San Luis Obispo area, and the San Diego area. The tree cannot survive the autumn and winter seasons in the temperate climate of western New York, where the body was found. Thus, investigators knew that Alexander and her clothing had acquired the Casuarina pollen grains at a location other than the dump site.

Researchers believed the southern California and San Diego region to be the best geographical pollen print match location for the grains from the clothing. Based on the pollen evidence and the girl's visible tan lines, forensic researchers suggested that she may have been living in the southwestern United States near San Diego, then traveled (perhaps by hitchhiking) through the Sierra Nevada mountains, where spruce and birch grow, passing through Reno, Nevada, and eventually across the country to upstate New York. A 2012 reexamination of the grains concluded, again, that they could have originated only from California, Arizona, or Florida.

== Identification ==
Alexander was formally identified on January 26, 2015, more than 35 years after her discovery. Laurel Nowell, a close friend in high school from Florida, had started trying to reach Alexander in the 2010s by social media. She eventually reached Alexander's half-sister, Pamela Dyson, of Panama City, who knew that she had often run away from home, but Dyson had not lived with her younger half-sister after about age 11. She learned that no one in her family knew anything of Alexander's whereabouts since the girl had left sometime between 1977 and 1979. An ex-boyfriend verified he had last seen her in the spring of 1979.

Dyson and Nowell became concerned that Alexander had fallen victim to a crime after leaving home. Dyson said that her mother did report Alexander as missing, but she has since assumed that, since Alexander had a history of running away and returning, police may not have taken the case seriously. In August 2014, the Hernando County sheriff's office told them no missing persons report had been filed for her, and promptly filed one.

Carl Koppelman, a California artist, came across the "missing person" report on Alexander as a moderator of the Websleuths online community, where volunteers try to solve cold cases including those of unidentified bodies. In 2010, four years earlier, he had sketched the portrait of "Caledonia Jane Doe" and posted it in the National Missing and Unidentified Persons System (NamUs). In September 2014, he saw the new listing for Alexander and quickly realized that they were the same person. He emailed the Livingston County Sheriff's Office (with copies sent to the NamUs regional administrator, the National Center for Missing and Exploited Children (NCMEC), and the Hernando County Sheriff's Office) to tell them of the strong resemblance between the two images. Police arranged to take a DNA sample from Dyson.

In January 2015, the Monroe County medical examiner's office found that MtDNA from the unidentified body matched that of Dyson, confirming that the victim was her half-sister. A week later on January 26, 2015, the Livingston County sheriff, Thomas Dougherty, announced at a news conference that Caledonia Jane Doe had been identified after 35 years.

Dyson said the family decided to keep Alexander buried in Dansville, New York, planning to hold a service there for her. "I'm truly glad for the closure," [Dyson] said. "But it hurts to know she died that way. It's terrible, nobody should have to be shot and dragged out into the woods." The Dougherty Funeral Home in Livonia, New York, said it paid to have the "Jane Doe" headstone removed and replaced with one reading "Tammy Jo Alexander". A public ceremony took place on June 10, 2015, when the new headstone, displaying the victim's name and lifespan, was revealed. Approximately one hundred family and community members attended. Dyson and other members of the Alexander family thanked the police and Livingston community for their caring for Alexander and continued efforts to find her killer. Dyson has since urged family members of missing people to enter the subjects into NamUs, saying that this database was critical in achieving her sister's identification.

The Livingston County Sheriff's Office released three audio clips of Alexander's voice on November 2, 2020, which would have been the victim's 57th birthday. She was believed to have created the recordings during July 1979 on a cassette tape, which she sent to her boyfriend, who had kept it in his possession until he provided it to the investigative agency.

== Perpetrator ==
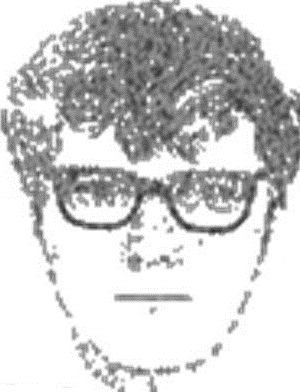
A facial composite of the man seen with Tammy Alexander prior to her murder.

Sheriff Dougherty has said the investigation would now focus on finding out who killed Alexander. "We've always said one of the biggest parts of solving this case is knowing the victim," he told the media. "This case is burning hot ... We're going to be working it harder than ever." Former sheriff York later said that more than 10,000 leads had already been investigated in the case.

Alexander was seen with a white male between five feet eight and five feet nine inches tall. He was seen driving a tan station wagon and wore black wire-rimmed glasses. The man was stated to be a "person of interest" in the case, and police continue to seek his identity. The waitress at the diner, who served the pair on the night of Alexander's death, explained the male companion had paid for the meal.

In 1984, serial killer Henry Lee Lucas confessed to the murder of the unidentified girl, without identifying her. Investigators could not find sufficient evidence to support his confession. Serial killer Christopher Wilder is also considered a person of interest in this case. This theory is rooted in Wilder's interest in vehicle racing, and the oversized red jacket Alexander was wearing was Autosport branded, a brand Wilder was known to purchase. Wilder was killed in a police shootout in 1984 before an interview regarding the Alexander case could take place.

Police speculate that the murder weapon the killer used was a .38-caliber handgun. Investigators located a spent slug in the dirt underneath the unidentified girl's body, which they compared forensically to hundreds of other bullets fired from confiscated weapons. Despite investigators' efforts to trace weapons from the U.S., Canada, Europe, and Mexico, the slug has not been matched to a specific gun.

The FBI posted billboards throughout the country about Alexander's murder in an attempt to gain new information from the public. By the end of February 2015, the Livingston County Sheriff's Department said they had received many more tips since Alexander's identification, enough to develop a scenario of events that led up to the girl's arrival in Caledonia. A trucker from Tennessee reported what police said was a "significant" lead after he had heard a radio broadcast detailing the case.

In March 2015, the department said that Alexander had ties to a former "prison ministry" in Young Harris, Georgia, which specialized in working with individuals "on probation or parole." By early 2016, the police had identified three male persons of interest who had known Alexander, and took male DNA from her clothing. By November 2016, the FBI had reported that none of the three matched the sample from Alexander's clothing, and continued to receive and investigate new leads in the case. By 2020, it was announced that the male DNA found on Alexander’s clothing was now being tested against national databases in search of a familial link to the killer. ^{[42]}

== In the media ==
In the decades she remained unidentified, the case received national attention. It was featured on such television shows as America's Most Wanted. In August of 2024, the podcast Method & Madness produced an episode on the case with the assistance of the Livingston County Sheriff's Department. After her discovery, two news organizations in Rochester, New York, partnered to produce a multi-part podcast in May 2016 detailing Alexander's murder and the ongoing investigation called Finding Tammy Jo. It was hosted by reporters Veronica Volk from WXXI News and Gary Craig from the Democrat and Chronicle, who spent a year co-reporting on the case. They had interviewed potential witnesses, law enforcement, and Alexander's family and friends.

== See also ==
- List of solved missing person cases (1970s)
- Murder of Michelle Garvey, a teenage girl murdered in 1982 and identified in 2014
- Murder of Tammy Vincent, a teenage girl murdered in 1979 and identified in 2007
- Murder of Anjelica Castillo, a toddler murdered in 1991 and identified in 2013
- Murder of Elizabeth Roberts, a teenage girl murdered in 1977 and identified in 2020
- Murder of Linda Pagano, a teenage girl murdered in 1974 and identified in 2018
