= Murder of Linda Pagano =

Formerly unidentified murder victim

Linda Marie Pagano
- Born: April 11, 1957
- Disappeared: September 1, 1974 (aged 17); Akron, Ohio
- Cause of death: Gunshot wound to the head
- Body discovered: February 5, 1975; Strongsville, Ohio
- Resting place: Holy Cross Cemetery, Akron, Ohio
- Relatives: Mike Pagano (brother), Cheryl Pagano (sister), Ann Collins (mother)

Linda Marie Pagano, formerly known as Strongsville Jane Doe, was an American murder victim from Akron, Ohio who was an unidentified decedent for 44 years. Following an argument with her stepfather on September 1, 1974, Pagano left her stepfather's apartment and was never seen again. On February 5, 1975, partial skeletal remains of a white female were found by three boys in a park in Strongsville, Ohio. After remaining unidentified, the bones were buried in an unmarked grave. Due to a clerical error, the bones were never entered into databases of unidentified decedents, and the case was largely forgotten about. In 2016, a college student doing genealogy research of her own family rediscovered the unidentified body. After posting about it online, the case gained the attention of Carl Koppelman, a forensic sketch artist. The new attention to the case led to a connection being made by the Akron police, and in June 2018 the remains were conclusively identified as Linda Pagano.

== Background ==
Linda Marie Pagano was born on April 11, 1957. At the time of her disappearance, she was a student at Springfield High in Akron, Ohio. Linda was the youngest of three children, with an older brother Michael Pagano and an elder sister Cheryl Pagano. Linda Pagano was described as honest, hard-working, and shy. Pagano had an after school job serving food at the A&W in Tallmadge, and was interested in rock music. During the summer of 1974, Pagano and her siblings were living with their stepfather, Byron Claflin, in his apartment on Carnegie Avenue in Akron. Claflin was employed as a bartender, and was described as a regular drinker with a volatile temper, however, Linda and Claflin were not reported to be on bad terms.

=== Disappearance ===
On August 31, 1974, Pagano attended a Crosby, Stills, Nash & Young rock concert in Cleveland with her boyfriend, Steve Wilson. Early on the morning of September 1, Pagano and Wilson arrived back in Akron. Pagano dropped Wilson off at his house and then returned to her stepfather's house. The stepfather, Byron Claflin, was the only witness to the following events leading up to Pagano's disappearance. According to Claflin, Pagano's late return at odd hours prompted an argument between Claflin and Pagano. The argument resulted in Claflin throwing Pagano out of the house. According to Claflin, Pagano left the apartment and did not return. This would be the last time anyone saw Pagano alive.

In the immediate days after Pagano's disappearance, family members assumed Linda was staying with friends. Claflin called Michael Pagano's mother to see if Linda was staying with her. A day after she was last seen, family members reported Linda Pagano as missing. At the time, Pagano's case gained little attention. Law enforcement were pursuing it under the impression that Pagano had run away, and there was no media coverage of the case. However, Pagano was not regarded as the type who would run away without a word, and her car, a Ford Mustang, had not been taken with her.

== Discovery of the body ==
On February 5, 1975, three boys were hiking in a park in Strongsville, Ohio when they discovered partial skeletal remains on the banks of Rocky River, now known as Mill Stream Run Reservation. The remains were heavily weathered, including a missing jawbone, and no physical evidence was recovered from the scene. It was determined that the remains belonged to a white female, and initial age estimates placed the remains at approximately 20 years old. The cause of death was ruled as a gunshot wound to the head, leading the case to be investigated as a homicide. Initially, attempts were made to link the bones to then-missing heiress Patty Hearst, who disappeared from California in 1974.

At the time of its discovery, Michael Pagano saw a TV broadcast about the unidentified body. Michael called the Strongsville police with the theory that it might be Linda, but was dismissed, being told that the victim was too old and likely too tall. After the body continued to remain unidentified, the remains were interred in an unmarked grave at a potter's field at Memorial Gardens in Highland Hills.

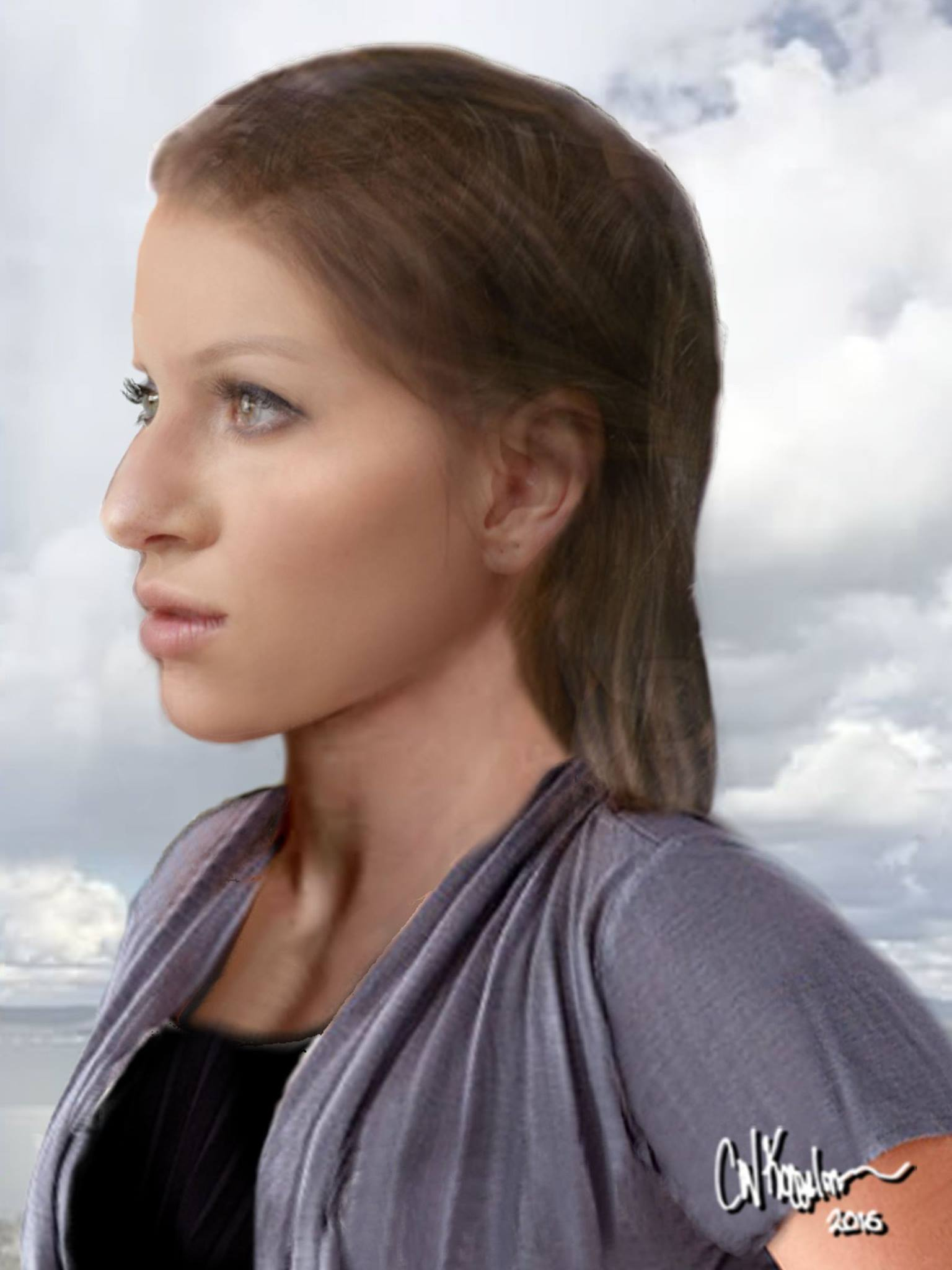
Reconstruction of Pagano by forensic artist Carl Koppelman

== Rediscovery of the case ==
In 2016, Christina Scates, a student at Cleveland State University was doing genealogy research on her own family history when she discovered the unidentified skeleton in the cemetery records. The available information about the skeleton was sparse. Scates, confused as to why it seemed like this young woman had been forgotten about, sought access to police files and autopsy records. Scates then posted her discoveries on Reddit, where it caught the attention of volunteer forensic artist Carl Koppelman. Koppelman created a reconstruction of the victim using photos of the skull which Scates had attained through her research, but this original reconstruction got little traction. When county law enforcement in Cuyahoga County reached out to Koppelman regarding a different case, Koppelman asked them about the unidentified bones. Scates also contacted law enforcement with concerns about how the bones did not appear on Cuyahoga County's list of unidentified remains. New photos of the skull were sent to Koppelman, and it was also discovered that a spelling error in the case files had prevented the bones from being added to databases for the missing and unidentified. Shortly after Scates contacted Cuyahoga County law enforcement, the bones were added to NamUs, the national database for missing and unidentified.

== Identification and ongoing investigation ==
Once the case had been added to NamUs, a potential match was quickly identified. The theory was first raised by an Internet sleuth on a subreddit for unsolved mysteries. Akron police reached out to police in Cuyahoga County regarding the possibility of the unidentified body being Linda Pagano. Dental records were exchanged as a preliminary comparison, and exhumation of the body for DNA analysis was soon discussed between Strongsville law enforcement, city officials, and medical examiners. After several months of discussion, the exhumation was performed in October 2017. Due to the many unmarked graves in the potter's field where the victim was buried, it took multiple attempts to exhume the correct body. Exhumation was assisted by the University of Akron, who used magnetic surveying to map the unmarked graves. Once the correct body had been exhumed, bone samples were taken from the victim, and DNA mouth swabs were taken from Cheryl and Michael Pagano. In late 2017, the samples were sent to University of North Texas for Mitochondrial DNA testing. On June 29, 2018, the unidentified body was conclusively identified as Linda Pagano, 44 years after her disappearance.

Following Linda's identification, Michael Pagano met Scates in person to express his gratitude. Linda's remains were returned to her family to be given a proper burial. In January 2019, a memorial service was held for Linda. The parts of Linda's skeleton that had been recovered were cremated and interred next to her late mother in Holy Cross Cemetery.

=== Continued investigation into the murder ===
The investigation into Pagano's murder is still considered an active case. Following Pagano's identification, the focus of the investigation was shifted to finding Pagano's killer. Because Pagano's remains were found on Metroparks land, the investigation is in the purview of the Cleveland Metroparks police. Michael Pagano has reported that updates from police regarding the investigation have been scarce since the identification conference. As of 2022, law enforcement has named two persons of interest in the case; Linda's stepfather, Byron Claflin, and Linda's boyfriend, Steve Wilson. Claflin, a key witness and potential suspect, died in 1990. No suspects have ever been officially identified, but several loved ones of Pagano believe that Claflin is somehow involved in her death. Because Pagano's disappearance is now classed as a homicide, family members and potential witnesses will be re-interviewed by law enforcement. Police are particularly interested in locating Steve Wilson, who is not considered a suspect, but is considered a key witness, being one of the last people to see Pagano alive.

== See also ==
- List of solved missing person cases (1970s)
- List of unsolved murders (1900–1979)
- Murder of Aundria Bowman
- Murder of Elizabeth Roberts
- Murder of Tammy Alexander
- Unidentified decedent
