= Murder of Deanna Criswell =

American formerly unidentified 1987 murder victim

Deanna Criswell
- Portrait of Deanna Criswell
- Born: Deanna Lee Criswell; September 20, 1971
- Disappeared: Summer 1987; Spokane, Washington, U.S.
- Died: November 1987 (aged 16); Marana, Arizona, U.S.
- Cause of death: Homicide by firearm
- Body discovered: November 25, 1987
- Resting place: Pima County Cemetery, Tucson, Arizona, U.S.
- Other name: "Jane Doe 19"
- Known for: Murder victim

Deanna Lee Criswell (officially known as "Jane Doe 19" until she was identified) (September 20, 1971 – c. November 1987) was an American teenager from Washington state who was murdered by a firearm at age 16 and remained unidentified for 27 years. Criswell's body was found on November 25, 1987, in Marana, Arizona, near Tucson. The Marana Police Department announced her identification on February 11, 2015, aided by the sophisticated technology of forensic facial reconstruction and DNA analysis, and by websites set up by amateurs to help identify missing and unidentified persons.

After Criswell's parents divorced, family members became estranged, and Criswell had periods of running away from home. She was never officially reported as missing. In 2014, Criswell's aunt and uncle, who had last seen her when she was only a baby, began to look for her. They began to search newly available online databases, focusing on unidentified persons in Arizona after learning that their niece had called her sister from Tucson in late 1987. They came across "Jane Doe 19"'s profile online at the Doe Network and believed the young woman's image, from a forensic facial reconstruction prepared by the FBI in 2010, resembled their niece. The aunt and uncle contacted law enforcement, who obtained DNA from family members and were able to confirm the match.

Authorities strongly suspected that William Ross Knight was the killer; Criswell had been involved with him when she went to Tucson. He died of illness in 2005, while in prison, where he had been sentenced on robbery charges. He had used a .22 caliber pistol in a robbery, the same caliber of gun that killed Criswell.

== Early life, disappearance and discovery ==
Deanna Lee Criswell was born in 1971 and grew up with her family in Spokane, Washington. She had a sister, Debbie, who was fourteen years older. Deanna's parents divorced when she was three years old. Her father Jerry Criswell was a trucker, and her mother, who had custody of Deanna, worked two jobs to support her family.

While growing up, Deanna often spent time with her maternal grandfather when her mother was away. Following his death, she became a "rebellious teen" and became involved with a questionable group of older peers. Deanna later moved to Seattle, where she lived with her father. Her behavior improved, but when she reached age 15, she began to act out again. She returned by bus to Spokane to live with her mother.

Six months before her death, Deanna ran away from home and lived on the streets, occasionally telephoning her father, but remaining estranged from her mother. She began a relationship with 36-year-old William "Bill" Ross Knight. After he relocated to Tucson, Arizona, Knight sent Deanna a bus ticket in September 1987 so that she could join him. Deanna did not call her father after reaching Tucson, but did call her older sister Debbie from the city. Deanna's father was not immediately concerned when he didn't hear from her, as he thought that she was able to "take care of herself." By Christmas, with no word, he attempted to file a missing person report, but local officials declined to cooperate due to Deanna's history of running away.

Deanna's body was discovered by a homeless man on November 25, 1987, in a culvert along Interstate 10 in Marana, Arizona. The man walked to the local police station to report the find. Police noted tire tracks at the scene, indicating the girl had been killed at another location and disposed out of sight after death.

== Investigation ==
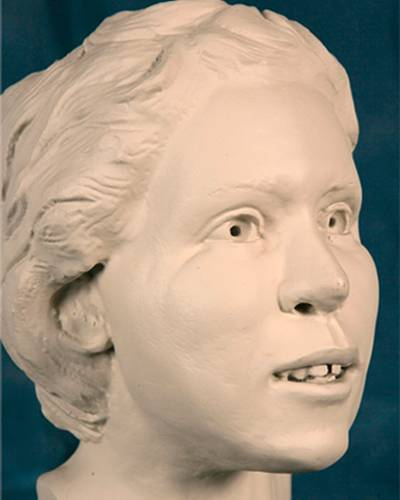
3D reconstruction of Criswell, created by the FBI

The remains were transported to the Pima County medical examiner for an autopsy, for determination of cause of death and a full description of her body. It was determined the girl had been dead about two weeks. It was also discovered the victim had recently had sex, but there was no evidence of rape.

The victim was estimated to have been between 17 and 21 years of age, at a height of around five feet, three inches, and a weight of 138 pounds. She was thought to be European American, or a Hispanic or Native American with fair skin. Her brown hair was determined to be short and curly. Her eye color could not be determined, as the body had decomposed. The body had no distinctive scars, birthmarks or tattoos. She did have unusual and large upper front teeth, with a gap between the center two on top. Her teeth had been well cared for, with adequate dental care.

The victim was wearing several layers of clothing, including a denim jacket with its sleeves rolled, a white jacket, gray sweater, a multicolored flannel shirt, black jeans, white shoes and purple underwear. Police said that the layers of clothing suggested that she was a runaway or perhaps a migrant. A purple sweater had been placed over her face. Law enforcement said that indicated her killer knew her during life and felt remorse, often a characteristic of crimes of passion. She was shot five times with a .22 caliber firearm. Criswell suffered four wounds to the torso and one to the neck at close range.

The Marana Police Department released details of the case, but was unable to identify the victim. Several missing females were compared to this victim, but many were excluded based on her dental characteristics. Fingerprints were also used for comparison. After the investigation stalled, the young woman, still unidentified, was buried in 1989 in the Pima County Cemetery.

The homeless man who reported her was quickly eliminated as a suspect. In 1988, a person of interest was also eliminated as a suspect: Benjamin Batson, a convicted sex offender who had been seen with an unknown teenage girl, was stopped by police for a traffic violation near the location where the body was found. The police searched his vehicle, but no trace evidence of the victim was found in it.

=== Influence of advances in DNA analysis and forensic facial reconstruction ===
Because of advances in technology for DNA analysis and other forensic tests, the cold case was eventually reopened in 2009. The victim's body was exhumed to obtain additional forensic evidence, including DNA. The police still had no suspects.

At their labs at Quantico, Virginia, the FBI completed a forensic facial reconstruction of the victim in 2010, after her exhumation. Such images were publicized so that someone who knew the young woman in life could recognize her. Posters were distributed in Arizona with this image. Her DNA was also processed by the agency to establish a profile.

In 2011, further advances in technology enabled a partial DNA profile of a potential perpetrator to be generated from evidence collected from the victim's body at the crime scene. The profile matched that of William "Bill" Ross Knight, who had become known in the 1980s for spree robberies. In 1987 he was known to have used a .22 caliber pistol in one robbery, which was the same caliber used in Criswell's homicide. He was arrested about nine days before Criswell's body was found and was prosecuted for robbery.

However, Knight had died in 2005 due to liver complications, while serving time in prison on robbery charges. Although he was identified as a suspect, the victim who had been shot with a gun of the same caliber that he used had DNA that did not match any individual in the CODIS database. Investigators feared that Knight's death left them with a blank wall, as they could not question him to identify his potential victim, and of course could not prosecute him. He was never charged with Criswell's homicide.

=== Identification ===
Criswell's case was one in which identification was aided by people using amateur online networks. Since the beginning of the 21st century, a number of websites and organizations have been established that post material about missing or unidentified persons, to engage the power of crowdsourcing. After long being estranged from Criswell's father, in 2014, her paternal aunt and uncle, Ellen and Donald Criswell, reconciled with him. When they learned that Deanna had not been heard from in decades and was never officially reported missing, they began to search online databases, after their prospects of their niece still being alive dwindled. Although her father had tried to report her as missing in 1987, police did not accept the case because of her history of running away from each parent.

Her family had thought she would "contact them when she wanted to." Criswell was found to have called her older sister Debbie Renn once after arriving in Tucson, but she had not called either of her parents. After learning from the father that Criswell had reached Tucson, her aunt and uncle started searching databases for unidentified persons in Arizona cases.

Some five to ten months before February 2015, the couple discovered the "Pima County Jane Doe" case and studied the facial reconstruction on The Doe Network. Criswell's father had given them a photo of Deanna as a teenager, and the couple thought the image of the reconstruction resembled their niece, including the space between her two top teeth. Other characteristics, such as the height and weight approximation, were also similar. After the pair contacted Pima County law enforcement, their staff took DNA samples from Criswell's parents to compare to the profile of the remains.

The match to Deanna Lee Criswell was announced on February 11, 2015, more than 27 years after her death. Her family decided to leave her buried in Pima County. In March 2015, Jerry, Donald and another of their brothers gathered at the cemetery and replaced the "Jane Doe 19" gravestone with a "Deanna L. Criswell" gravestone.

== See also ==
- List of solved missing person cases: 1950–1999
- List of unsolved murders (1980–1999)
- Murder of Tammy Alexander, who was unidentified for 35 years
- Murder of Anjelica Castillo, who was unidentified for 22 years
