= Murder of Brenda Gerow =

American ex-unidentified 1981 murder victim

Brenda Gerow
- Gerow as she appeared in the photograph in possession of John Kalhauser
- Born: Brenda Marie Gerow; February 18, 1960
- Disappeared: July 20, 1980; Nashua, New Hampshire, US
- Status: Identified after 34 years
- Died: c. April 6, 1981 (aged 21); Tucson, Arizona, US
- Cause of death: Homicide by ligature strangulation
- Body discovered: April 8, 1981
- Other name: Pima County Jane Doe
- Known for: Formerly unidentified victim of homicide
- Height: 5 ft 2 in (1.57 m) (minimum) and 5 ft 3 in (1.60 m) (maximum)

Brenda Marie Gerow (/dʒɜːroʊ/) (February 18, 1960 – c. April 6, 1981), previously known as Pima County Jane Doe, was a formerly unidentified American murder victim whose body was found on April 8, 1981. In late 2014, a photograph of a facial reconstruction of the victim was made public that led to Gerow's identification the next year. She had been buried under a headstone with the placeholder name of "Jane Doe" with the phrase "UNK – 1981". Gerow's body remained unidentified for 34 years until it was announced that her remains had positively been identified.

== Disappearance and murder ==
Gerow, the oldest of her siblings, disappeared in July 1980 after leaving with John "Jack" Kalhauser, her boyfriend at the time. She had worked at a convenience store and as a bartender at an establishment in Dracut, Massachusetts, often frequented by bikers. She remained in contact with family and had at one time called home stating she would be returning, yet she never did. Her family attempted to report her missing, yet local police declined to cooperate, due to the fact that she was an adult when she vanished.

The body of a white female was found in the desert on April 8, 1981, in Tucson, Pima County, Arizona, near Houghton Road and Interstate 10. Her remains were found by hunters driving in the desert who saw a jacket hanging from a tree and then looked through the area and discovered her body lying on the ground.

The victim was a young adult, between 18 and 22 years of age. The autopsy determined she died one-and-a-half to two days before her body was discovered and cause of death was strangulation by ligature. She had been severely beaten, in addition to being sexually assaulted. When found, her body was in an advanced state of decomposition rendering her facially unrecognizable and her eye color undetermined. The pathologist who examined her was able to determine she had a light skin complexion as well as long, light brown to blond hair. The victim also had a noticeable white spot on one of her upper front teeth. She was approximately 5 ft 2 in (1.57 m) to 5 ft 3 in (1.60 m) tall and weighed around 100–110 pounds (45–50 kg) at the time of her death. Additional evidence at the scene may have been blown away due to winds.

Her body was clothed in denim jeans, white socks with pink pom poms, a white bra, blue panties, brown suede shoes and unique blouse that was navy blue with puffy red floral sleeves. A denim jacket was found hanging in brush near the body.

== Investigation ==
The crime scene was photographed and law enforcement flew over the area to take further photographs and to look for any additional clues. Body decomposition was not advanced enough to completely alter her fingerprints, which were eventually taken. Dental information was obtained along with, years later, her DNA. A DNA profile from another individual was extracted from her clothing in 2006, which allowed for a DNA profile of a potential suspect to be created after sample analysis in 2007. At the time the victim was found, authorities in Tucson were unable to obtain fingerprints. In an effort to obtain her fingerprints, the victim's hands were removed from the body and sent to the FBI. While the FBI was successful in getting fingerprints, they did not match any missing persons on file or anyone arrested for a crime. The case was compared to several missing person cases but all were ruled out. To investigators, the style of some of her clothing suggested she could have been involved in the local county fair that had occurred at the time of her murder. Images of the victim's clothing were featured on websites, National Center for Missing and Exploited Children posters, and in news reports, in an effort to identify her. The victim had been walking or running through a wooded area before her death, as suggested by scratches on her body.

A "crude" sketch was created of the victim following her discovery. It was released to the public on television and in the newspapers, yet the victim was not recognized by anyone in the area. After a 2012 exhumation of the body, the victim's face was digitally reconstructed after her skull was examined via a CT scan. The scan was sponsored by the National Center for Missing & Exploited Children in order to create an approximation of facial features and appearance when the victim was alive.

Different theories regarding the life and demise of the victim existed. Investigators theorized she was a runaway as a child before she became an adult, had possibly been estranged from family, had been murdered elsewhere and dumped at a different scene, or had hitchhiked to Tucson from another location. Early in the investigation, it was theorized she could have been a victim of the then-unidentified Golden State Killer, who had moved south since his criminal career began in the mid-1970s.

=== Later efforts and identification ===
In 1995, while "building a case" against Kalhauser for assault charges, a photograph of a young woman with light hair holding a bouquet was found in his possession. In late 2014, police announced that they believed the photograph was connected to the case of Pima County Jane Doe and released it to the public. The woman in the photo resembled the victim's reconstruction and her physical description. The photograph is believed to have been taken between 1979 and 1981, also fitting the time frame in which Jane Doe was found. Kalhauser refused to identify the woman in the photograph.

The then-unidentified woman's photograph was circulated to the public in late 2014 after authorities made the connection between it and the reconstruction. Authorities noted that the background scenery appeared to be from somewhere in the Eastern part of the country, possibly a former camping area in Tyngsboro, Massachusetts. On December 23, 2014, her brother, Bill Gerow Jr., received a notification from police that the female in the picture could be his sister. Gerow hadn't been seen since 1980, when she was 20, after she left the state voluntarily with Kalhauser, with whom she was in a relationship. She had reportedly met Kalhauser at a nightclub. She had never explained the reason for her departure, although her family believed she had "run off." Her brother stated that she had called him around two to three weeks afterwards while in New Mexico. After this, she was never heard from again, although her family continued efforts to locate her. Gerow could not have officially been reported missing because she was over the age of 18 and had apparently left on her own accord.

Kalhauser has past ties to Arizona and is believed to have murdered his wife, Diane Van Reeth, in 1995; he was living under an assumed name at the time of his wife's death. Although Van Reeth's body has never been found, Kalhauser was later convicted of her murder in 1999. Other events in Kalhauser's criminal history include being convicted of manslaughter for the 1974 shooting of Paul Chapman and being indicted for the attempted murder of a man in 1979. Following his indictment for the 1979 case, Kalhauser jumped bail and fled after being released from jail. When he married Diane Van Reeth in Nevada, he used a false name to avoid being discovered. Kalhauser was sentenced to 20 years in prison in Arizona following his conviction for second-degree murder. Arizona prison records show that he completed his sentence on May 8, 2019.

On September 28, 2015, information was released that the body of the unidentified victim had been formally identified as Gerow in April 2015, and that her body would be returned to family members. The identification was made through comparison of the family's DNA compared to that of the victim. Gerow's father, William Sr., stated he did not understand any possible motive for the death of his daughter. Kalhauser is considered a person of interest in the murder; police have asked for information from anyone who knew Kalhauser and Gerow in the late 1970s or early 1980s. After the family received the remains, the body was cremated.

In 2017, Gerow's and Van Reeth's cases were featured on the second episode of Who Killed Jane Doe? on Investigation Discovery. Her brother and father provided interviews.

== See also ==
- Lists of solved missing person cases
- List of unsolved murders (1980–1999)
