= The Doe Network =

U.S. nonprofit organization

Doe Network
- Revised logo, created in 2019.
- Formation: 1999
- Founder: Jennifer Marra (Web Site Founder); Helene Wahlstrom and Todd Matthews (Volunteer Group Co-Founders)
- Purpose: Body identification
- Headquarters: Livingston, Tennessee
- Location: United States
- Volunteers: 70+
- Website: https://doenetwork.org

The Doe Network is a non-profit organization of volunteers who work with law enforcement to connect missing persons cases with John/Jane Doe cases. They maintain a website about cold cases and unidentified persons, and work to match these with missing persons.

== Purpose ==
The organization's website features cold case disappearances and unidentified decedents, to create awareness for such cases and to generate potential leads. Case files are created for both unidentified and missing persons, detailing physical estimations of the subjects as well as circumstances of the disappearance, sightings, and recovery of the unidentified subjects.

Images of the missing and unidentified, including forensic facial reconstructions, tattoos, and age progressions are also posted when available for cases. Cases of murder conviction without a body are also listed, although their cases have been solved. In some instances, the victim could possibly remain unidentified.

The website provides an online form so that visitors can submit potential matches between missing and unidentified persons, which are subsequently reviewed by volunteers prior to submission to authorities. After the form is completed by a reader, 16 members of the Doe Network's administrative panel evaluate the importance of the possible match and whether or not to submit it to investigators handling the case. This organization also works alongside other databases, such as the National Missing and Unidentified Persons System and the NCIC.

The Doe Network features worldwide cases and is presented in various languages.

Since the launch of the Doe Network, more than 600 people have volunteered to take part in case reviews. Members are selected after review of their applications and confirmation of their background information. A core team organizes information that is published on the Web site, compiling approved information received from other members.

== History ==
The Doe Network website was created in 1999 by Jennifer Marra of Michigan as a website database for international long-term missing persons and unidentified victims. Marra turned control of the site over to Helene Wahlstrom of Sweden in 2001.

Helene Wahlstrom joined forces with the Cold Cases Yahoo! group headed by Todd Matthews of Tennessee, and they recruited a wider volunteer group to assist the Doe Network to find potential matches between missing persons and unidentified victims. Matthews had assisted in the 1998 identification of Barbara Ann Hackmann Taylor, who was previously nicknamed "Tent Girl" in her cold case. This success inspired him to create a website to help solve similar cases.

Over the years, the Doe Network has been recognized for its work as one of a number of amateur groups who use the Internet to assist families and law enforcement with trying to identify missing persons and unidentified victims.

Matthews founded a different organization, known as Project EDAN (Everyone Deserves a Name). This is a group of forensic artists who create images of unidentified victims for posting on the Internet in an effort to reach people who know them.

The Doe Network has members worldwide, including volunteers from all 50 US states.

According to the Doe Network, they have solved and assisted in closing 113 missing and unidentified cases; 36 were completed within its first five years of operation. The list of solved cases also includes submitted matches which were not used or confirmed by law enforcement. Resolved cases include those of Deanna Criswell, found in 1987 and identified in 2015; Samantha Bonnell, found and identified in 2005; and Dorothy Gay Howard, found in 1954 and identified in 2009.

Criswell, who had been missing from Spokane, Washington, was identified after family members saw the case file on the Doe Network of an unidentified teen found in Arizona. They submitted information about a possible link between her and their relative. Samantha Bonnell's mother recognized a facial reconstruction created by the National Center for Missing & Exploited Children, usually for the use of law enforcement, which the Doe Network posted in its Internet file of the young woman.

Other cases have been solved in a similar way. Loved ones or police investigators may see a case file on the website that details a case similar to a missing person or unidentified victim of a homicide. Several other cases have been solved through the potential match submissions.

The Doe Network has been criticized for forwarding too much unrelated data to law enforcement officials, according to a 2008 interview with Matthews by National Public Radio.

== In popular culture ==
- The Doe Network, its founders, and history were featured in the book The Skeleton Crew: How Amateur Sleuths Are Solving America's Coldest Cases (2014) by Deborah Halber.
- The Doe Network was mentioned in a July 2008 episode of Forensic Files
- The Doe Network was shown in a 2018 episode of Who Killed Jane Doe?
