= Barbara Ann Hackmann Taylor =

American murder victim (1943–1967)

Barbara Ann Hackmann
- Born: Barbara Ann Hackmann; September 12, 1943; Illinois, U.S.
- Disappeared: December 6, 1967 (aged 24); Lexington, Kentucky, U.S.
- Cause of death: Homicide
- Body discovered: May 17, 1968 near Georgetown, Kentucky, U.S.
- Resting place: Georgetown Cemetery in Georgetown, Kentucky
- Other names: Bobbie Taylor, "Tent Girl"
- Known for: Homicide victim who was not identified for 30 years
- Height: 5 ft 1 in (1.55 m)
- Spouse: George Earl Taylor

Barbara Ann "Bobbie" Hackmann Taylor (née Hackmann; September 12, 1943 – c. December 1967), also known as the "Tent Girl", was notable as an unidentified homicide victim for nearly 30 years after her body was found on May 17, 1968, near Georgetown, Kentucky. She was referred to as "Tent Girl" because of the material wrapped around her. On April 23, 1998, the Scott County Sheriff's Office announced that this victim had been identified. Hackmann Taylor, born in Illinois, was married and had an eight-month-old daughter when she went missing from her home in Lexington, Kentucky.

Her late husband, George Earl Taylor, was a carnival worker and the prime suspect in the murder case. He did not file a missing person report but told her family that she had left him for another man. He died of cancer in October 1987. Because he was a prime suspect, Hackmann's family excluded his name when they commissioned a new tombstone for her gravesite. This gave her full name and dates and was added beneath one formerly identifying her as "Tent Girl" at her grave at the Georgetown Cemetery. She had been buried in 1971 by local authorities when her case was stalled.

== History ==
Wilbur Riddle, who had been scavenging for glass insulators alongside U.S. Route 25 near Georgetown, Kentucky, on May 17, 1968, discovered a decomposing body wrapped in a heavy green canvas tarpaulin. It was material such as might be used to wrap up a tent. A police investigation failed to identify the deceased woman, or to name any suspects in her apparent murder, despite efforts to publicize her description and check reports of missing women.

With no new leads in the case, her remains were buried in 1971 in the Georgetown Cemetery. A local company donated the headstone, which was inscribed with the following: TENT GIRL
FOUND MAY 17 1968
ON U.S. HIGHWAY 25, N.
DIED ABOUT APRIL 26 – MAY 3, 1968
AGE ABOUT 16 – 19 YEARS
HEIGHT 5 FEET 1 INCH
WEIGHT 110 TO 115 LBS.
REDDISH BROWN HAIR
UNIDENTIFIED It also included an engraving of a police sketch made to depict how she might have looked in life.

== Identification ==
In April 1998, the Tent Girl was positively identified by the Scott County Sheriff's Office as Barbara Ann Hackmann Taylor. They were aided by the efforts of Todd Matthews, then 27, of Livingston, Tennessee. In the late 1980s, he married a daughter of Wilbur Riddle, who found the young woman. Matthews heard about the missing woman, whose fate had haunted his father-in-law. He became intensely interested in the case and, as the Internet began to be frequently used for posting of public databases and volunteer websites of missing and unidentified persons, Matthews combed through many reports to identify her. In 1997 he created his own website for the Tent Girl, as another way to make people aware of her.

In 1998 Matthews discovered a description of Taylor posted by the Hackmann family on a missing persons website. They had a young married female relative who had gone missing in Lexington, Kentucky (approximately 15 miles from Georgetown) in late 1967. She had been living there with her husband and infant daughter. He emailed information on the Tent Girl to Rosemary Westbrook of Arkansas, who was listed as a contact for the family. She believed the information matched her missing sister and contacted the Scott County Sheriff's Office. They confirmed elements of her description of her sister, including a distinctive gap between her top two center teeth.

The police arranged to exhume the body, to extract DNA for analysis and potential match to Hackmann family members. A match was made and on April 26, 1998, the Sheriff's Office confirmed the victim's identity as Barbara Ann Hackmann. She was survived by three sisters: Rosemary Westbrook of Benton, Arkansas; Jan Daigle of Placerville, California; and Marie Copeland of Arundel, Maine.

In addition, Bobbie's daughter had been traced to Ohio where her father's family had lived. She was married and had her own children by the time her mother was identified.

The family chose to have Hackmann's remains reinterred in Georgetown Cemetery, with an additional stone base placed under the original grave marker, bearing her birth name, nickname, date of birth, presumed date of death, and the inscription "Loving Mother, Grandmother & Sister".

The Hackmann family excluded Barbara's married name from her gravestone. The police have identified her late husband, George Earl Taylor, as the prime suspect in the murder case. He died of cancer in October 1987.

== Representation in other media ==
- An episode of the true crime series Who Killed Jane Doe? covered the case of the "Tent Girl".
- The true crime podcast Crime Junkie covered the case in their episode titled "Tent Girl."
- The true crime podcast My Favorite Murder covered the case in their episode titled "Namaste Sexy."
- The true crime podcast Anatomy of Murder covered the case in their episode titled "Swapping Ghost Stories." October 27, 2021
- The true crime podcast Cold Cases covered the case in their episode titled "Tent Girl and Julie Doe."
- The true crime podcast Unsolved Murders covered the case in their episode titled "Tent Girl."
- The true crime podcast Brew covered the case in their episode titled “How the Internet Cracked a 30-Year Cold Case Police Called Impossible.”

== Aftermath ==
After Taylor's identification, Matthews co-founded The Doe Network. It is a group that maintains an online database for volunteers dedicated to matching missing persons with unidentified decedents.

== See also ==
- Lists of solved missing person cases
- List of unsolved murders (1900–1979)
