= Rogelio Martínez =

Rogelio Martínez may refer to:

- Rogelio Martínez (baseball) (1918–2010), Cuban baseball pitcher in Major League Baseball
- Rogelio Martínez (boxer) (born 1974), Dominican Republic boxer
- Rogelio Martínez Díaz, Afro-Cuban musician with Sonora Matancera
- Rogelio Martínez Furé (1937–2022), Cuban writer and ethnologist
- Rogelio Martinez (playwright) (born 1971), Cuban playwright
- Rogelio Martínez Santillán (1960–2017), Mexican educator and politician
- Rogelio del Rosario Martinez or Michael II, Filipino conclavist who claims to be pope
- Rogelio Nores Martínez (1906–1975), Argentine engineer and politician

== See also ==
- Death of Rogelio Martinez, unsolved 2017 death of a United States Border Patrol agent
