= Body in the cylinder =

Unidentified body in Liverpool, England

Coordinates: 53.426572°N 2.980041°W

Location where the cylinder containing the body was found

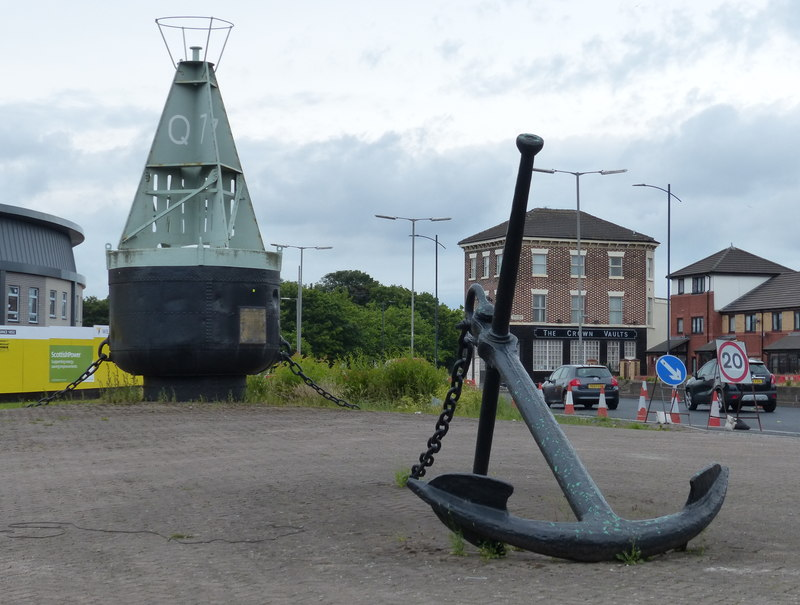
Approximate location where the cylinder containing the body was found – photographed nearer the present day

The "body in the cylinder" refers to the body of a man discovered within a partially sealed steel cylinder on a derelict WWII bomb site in Liverpool, England. The discovery was made in 1945 and it is believed that the body had lain undiscovered for 60 years. Inquiries named a strong (but unconfirmed) candidate for the identity of the dead man; however, the cause of death and the reason for his presence in the cylinder remain a mystery.

== Discovery of the cylinder ==
In the summer of 1943, American soldiers were clearing a blitzed site at the back of the Methodist Church on Boundary Street East in Liverpool. An American bulldozer uncovered the cylinder while it was clearing building debris. One end of the cylinder was capped with a steel plate and the other was open. The bulldozer moved the cylinder and during the operation it unintentionally crushed the open end. Building contractors then extracted the cylinder from the building rubble and laid it level.

After the summer of 1943, the cylinder went largely unnoticed. A local witness, Norman Garner of 278 Great Homer Street, stated that he had seen people use the cylinder as a seat and children often played with it. About two weeks prior to the discovery of the body, witnesses saw children rolling the cylinder across from some waste land in Great Homer Street to Claudia Street.

=== Description of the cylinder ===
The cylinder had a length of 6 feet 9 inches (2.1 m), a diameter of 19 inches (480 mm), and was made of gauge 9 steel 0.156 inches (4 mm) thick. The metal cap to the closed end of the cylinder was bolted in place. The open end of the cylinder had been compressed, and almost crimped shut, by the bulldozer leaving an aperture of only 4 inches (100 mm). No traces of paint were found inside the cylinder; further, the general opinion in 1945 was that it had been part of a ventilation shaft.

== Discovery of the body ==
On 13 July 1945, three small boys were playing with the cylinder. They were rolling it through the streets when one tried to see what was inside. At first, they saw what appeared to be a shoe; however, on closer inspection it appeared to be part of a human skeleton. The police were called to the scene and they used an oxy-acetylene torch to cut the cylinder open. The contents were revealed to be a complete human skeleton accompanied by a number of items. The police removed the remains and took them to the mortuary.

== Description of the victim ==
The remains were found to be those of an adult male who would have been about 6 feet (1.8 m) tall in life. It was thought, in 1945, that the man was aged between 25 and 50 at the time of his death. The body appeared to have been in situ for a long time.

The left base of the skeleton's skull was missing. The cranium was broken near to the left middle-ear but this did not appear to be due to violence. The head and torso had become detached at some point through movement. A small amount of hair was found still adhered to the skull.

It appeared that the man had crawled into the cylinder. The position of the skeleton suggested that the man was lying down and using a brick wrapped in sacking as a pillow when he died. The body was found fully clothed and lying full length on some sacking but not within it. He was dressed in clothes typical of the later Victorian period and they appeared to be of good quality.

=== Items found with body ===
Numerous items were found with the body. These items included two diaries, seven heavily corroded keys and some miscellaneous papers. No money or other valuables were found in the dead man's pockets. The list of items found in the cylinder, as reported in 1945, is as follows:

- Two diaries dated 1884 and 1885. The diaries were largely illegible to the coroner in 1945, but one diary entry dated June 1885 noted an "appointment for 1 pm with F. C. Gredy at Cons".
- A postcard (decayed but reconstructed by coroner), postmarked Birmingham, date stamped 3 July 1885. The postcard was addressed to T. C. Williams from Mr A. E. Harris.
- A handkerchief, though with nothing identifiable on it.
- A brooch.
- A gold signet ring of a green stone flecked with red. The signet ring had been well worn and carried the hallmark 'London 1859'.
- A London North Western Railway advice note dated 27 June 1885.
- Five account sheets (four unused), from T. C. Williams and Co.
- A billhead receipt from T. C. Williams and Co, Leeds St, Liverpool.

== Investigation ==
The inquest was opened on 19 July 1945 and adjourned for a month by the Liverpool Coroner Mr G. C. Mort.

There was no evidence that the man had been killed in the Blitz, as had been suspected initially. The pathologist noted a large amount of moisture in the cylinder which indicated three possible scenarios. 1. The victim could have been in the unsealed cylinder for about 10 years. 2. The cylinder could have been sealed airtight. 3. There could have been moisture ingress and it had not dried out. The last two scenarios indicated that it was possible that the body had been in the cylinder since 1885 or 1890. Conditions in the cylinder indicated that the body had undergone normal decomposition.

On 31 August 1945, the coroner closed the inquest by recording an open verdict stating that it was impossible to establish cause of death due to insufficient information. The date of death was believed to have been 1885.

=== Thomas Creegan Williams ===
In August 1945, the inquest named T. C. Williams, a paint and brush manufacturer of 5 Leeds Street, Liverpool, as a potential identity for the dead man. T. C. Williams and Co. were a paint, varnish and colour merchants in Tithebarn Street with works in Smithfield Street around 1885. Thomas Creegan Williams lived at 29 Cambridge Road in Seaforth, then Woodville House, Abbotsford Road in Blundellsands.

Williams was declared bankrupt on 10 March 1884. The inquest hypothesised that Williams had left his family home due to financial difficulties and was sleeping in the cylinder at what were assumed to be his business premises. Somehow the cylinder became sealed and he asphyxiated. It was thought that his disappearance may have been interpreted in 1885 as deliberate absconding in order to avoid his creditors; working one's passage to another country via ship was not an unknown method of escaping debt at the time.

According to records obtained by the inquiry, Williams's wife was buried alone in Liverpool but no records of the death of Williams or his burial in Liverpool could be found. Indeed, there were no records in England and Wales of a T. C. Williams being buried. T. C. Williams had one son born 1859. The inquiry sought relatives of Williams but had no success at the time.

== See also ==
- List of unsolved deaths
