= List of unsolved deaths =

This list of unsolved deaths includes notable cases where:

- The cause of death could not be officially determined following an investigation
- The person's identity could not be established after they were found dead
- The cause is known, but the manner of death (homicide, suicide, accident) could not be determined following an investigation
- Different official investigations have come to different conclusions

== Unsolved deaths ==
=== Ancient ===
- The La Brea Woman is the partial skeleton of a young woman (aged 18–25) excavated from the La Brea Tar Pits in present-day Los Angeles, California in 1914. Radiocarbon dating places her date of death between 8250 and 8220 BCE (10,250–10,220 BP). Her precise cause and circumstances of death have not been established.
- The Younger Lady (25–35) is the informal name given to the mummy of a woman who lived during the Eighteenth Dynasty of Egypt and was discovered in the Egyptian Valley of the Kings in tomb KV35 by archaeologist Victor Loret in 1898. Genetic analysis published in 2010 identified the KV35 Younger Lady as the mother of Tutankhamun and indicated that she and the KV55 mummy were children of Amenhotep III and Queen Tiye. Her cause of death has not been established.
- Tutankhamun (18–19), an Egyptian pharaoh, died around 1323 BCE. Medical and genetic examination identified several disorders and evidence of malaria infection, but his precise cause of death remains debated.
- The Hasanlu Lovers are the remains of two humans found at Teppe Hasanlu, Iran, in 1972 who are thought to have died c. 800 BCE. Their precise causes of death have not been established.
- The Borremose bodies are three bog bodies found in 1946 and 1948 in the Borremose peat bog in Himmerland, Denmark. The first Borremose man was found with a rope around his neck, indicating hanging, while forensic examination did not establish whether the death of Borremose Woman resulted from homicide, suicide, accident, or natural causes.
- The Saltmen are naturally preserved human remains recovered from the salt mines at Chehrabad in Zanjan Province, Iran. Archaeological evidence indicates that some of the miners died when mine galleries collapsed, while the circumstances surrounding all of the recovered individuals have not been established.
- Alexander the Great (32) died in Babylon in 323 BCE following an acute illness. Numerous causes have subsequently been proposed, and medical studies have reached different conclusions about the cause of his fatal illness.
- Cleopatra (39), the last ruler of Ptolemaic Egypt, died in Alexandria in August 30 BCE. Ancient accounts generally describe her death as suicide but differ over the method, including accounts involving snakebite or poison. The surviving evidence does not establish the precise method of her death.
- The Weerdinge Men were two bog bodies found in the southern part of Bourtanger Moor in Drenthe, the Netherlands, in 1904. The taller individual had a substantial chest wound, while the cause of death of the smaller individual remains uncertain. They died between approximately 160 BCE and 220 CE.

=== Medieval ===
- Princess Yongtai (15–16), 701. In both the Old Book of Tang and New Book of Tang, it is recorded that she was executed by Empress Wu Zetian with her brother and husband because of spreading rumors about the two officials Zhang Yizhi and Zhang Changzong, who were also the lovers of Empress Wu Zetian. However, from her epitaph, it was said she was pregnant when she died. From a piece of her pelvic bone, it has been presumed that she died from childbirth, because her pelvis seems to be smaller than other women at the same age. It is also suspected that she went into shock on hearing the news that her brother and husband had been executed, and it caused a fatal miscarriage.
- Emperor Taizu of Song (49), the first emperor of Song dynasty, died in 976. There are no records about how he died. However, his younger brother was granted the throne due to the fact that he had two grown sons. There is a folk story "shadows by the candle and sounds from an axe" possibly indicating that he was murdered by his brother, but it may also have been a suicide.
- Roopkund is a high-altitude glacial lake in the Uttarakhand state of India. It lies in the lap of Trishul massif, located in the Himalayas. It is widely known for the hundreds of ancient human skeletons found at the edge of the lake. The human skeletal remains are visible at its bottom when the snow melts. Research generally points to a semi-legendary event where a group of people were killed in a sudden, violent hailstorm in the 9th century. Studies placed the time of mass death around the 9th century CE (1,200 years old) and second group of skeletons were dated to the 19th century CE. The skeletons' identities are unknown, but radiocarbon dating suggests that the older remains were deposited over an extended period of time, while the remains of the younger group were deposited during a single event.
- Harthacnut (23–24), King of Denmark and England, 1042, died while attending the wedding of Tovi the Proud in Lambeth. The Anglo-Saxon Chronicle states that he suddenly collapsed "with an awful convulsion" after standing to deliver a toast. Although he was rumored to be ill, he does not appear to have been dying, and the manner of his death does not fit with the idea of a terminal illness.
- King William II of England (43–44), 1100, was killed by an arrow while hunting; it may or may not have been an accident.
- Agnès Sorel (28), 1450, was Charles VII of France's chief royal mistress, having four daughters with him. Sorel fell ill while pregnant with their 4th daughter, and after giving birth, died on 9 February 1450 from causes which are disputed.

=== Early modern ===
- The Lovers of Cluj-Napoca (30s), a nickname given to two skeletons found in a former Dominican convent in Cluj-Napoca, Romania in 2013, are thought to have lived between 1450 and 1550. Their exact causes of death are unclear.
- Henry Holland, 3rd Duke of Exeter (45), a Lancastrian, died after mysteriously falling overboard and drowning while sailing through the English Channel in September 1475. Though there are different theories to what happened, none were ever proved to be true.
- Regiomontanus (40), whose real name was "Johannes Müller von Königsberg", was an astrologer, mathematician, and astronomer of the German Renaissance who was active in countries in Europe. He was thought to have died from the plague on 6 July 1476, but this is not known for sure.
- Princes in the Tower, used to refer to Edward V, King of England and Richard of Shrewsbury, Duke of York who disappeared in the summer of 1483. In 1674, workmen at the Tower of London dug up a wooden box under the staircase in the Tower which contained two small human skeletons. The bones were widely accepted at the time as those of the princes, but this remains uncertain. King Charles II had the bones buried in Westminster Abbey, where they remain.
- Amy Robsart (28), 1560, was the first wife of Lord Robert Dudley, favourite of Queen Elizabeth I of England. She is primarily known for her death by falling down a flight of stairs, the circumstances of which have often been regarded as suspicious.
- King Charles XII (36) of Sweden was struck in the head by a projectile and killed. The definitive circumstances around Charles's death remain unclear. Despite multiple investigations of the battlefield, Charles's skull and his clothes, it is not known where and when he was hit, or whether the shot came from the ranks of the enemy or from his own men.
- Cornelia Zangheri Bandi (66) was an Italian noblewoman whose death on 15 March 1731 may have been a case of spontaneous human combustion. But the case has never been proven, with the true cause of death remaining unknown.
- A human skull that was found off Vanikoro in April 2003 was thought to have been that of Gaspard Duché de Vancy (35–36), who disappeared in 1788. Who it belonged to and the cause of death are unknown.
- Wolfgang Amadeus Mozart (35), composer, died on 5 December 1791. The circumstances of his death have attracted much research and speculation, as it remains unclear whether he died from disease or poisoning. There have also been conspiracy theories.

=== 19th century ===
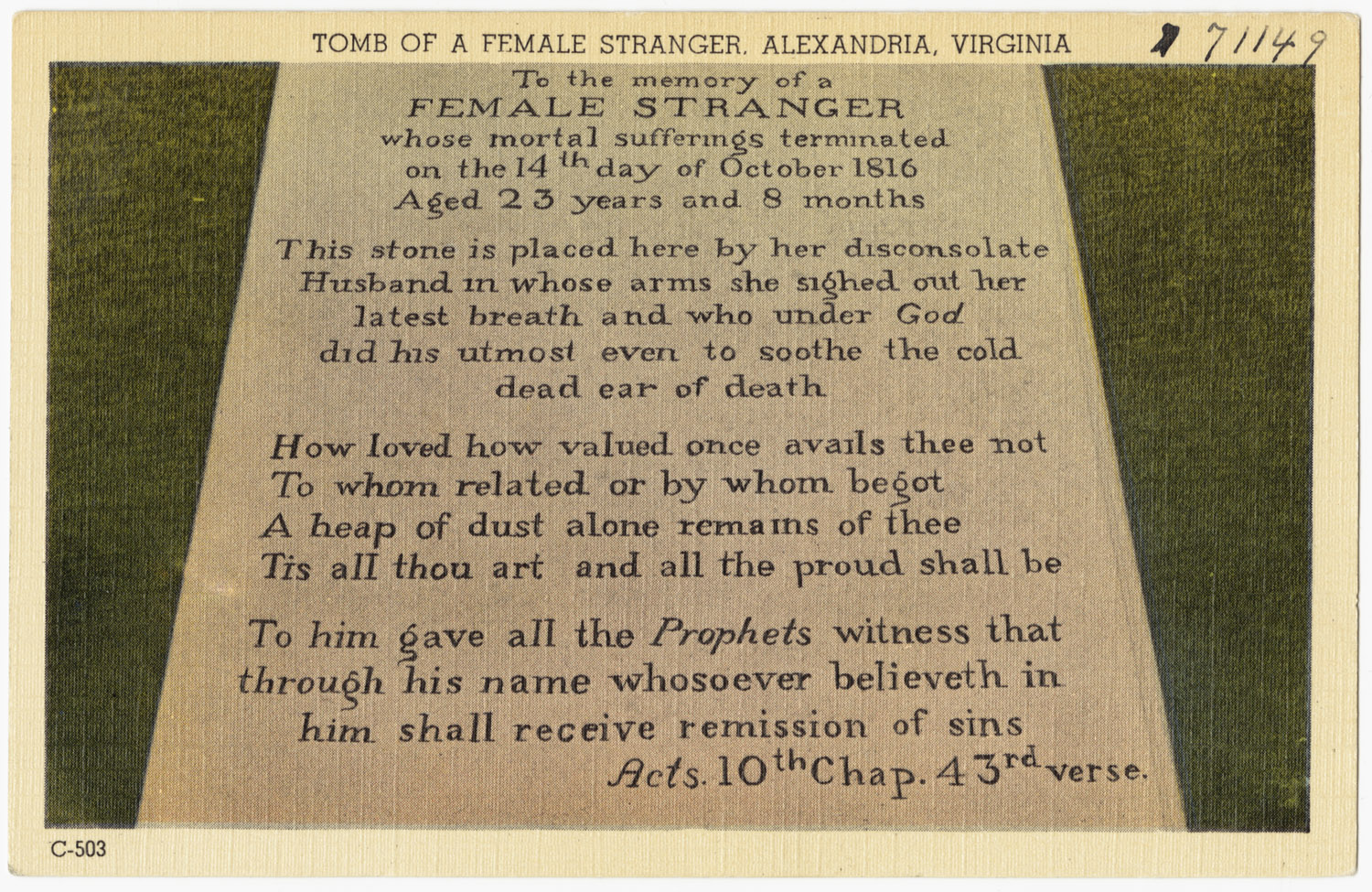
Headstone of the Female Stranger

- Meriwether Lewis (35), a US explorer who helped explore Louisiana Purchase territory, was found dead with multiple gunshot wounds in an inn along the Natchez Trace nature trail in Tennessee, in 1809. Though it was originally declared a suicide, historians debate whether it was possibly murder due to the nature of his injuries and the lack of a thorough autopsy.
- The Female Stranger (23) refers to an unnamed US woman who died in 1816 and was elevated to national intrigue by the mysterious headstone and romanticized tale. Accounts of the stranger increase in oddity over time and help to incite further speculation as to the identity of the person buried in the grave. The reported location of the woman's death, Room 8 at Gadsby's Tavern, is also a tourist destination, and supposedly her ghostly visage can be seen standing at the window.
- Paul Johann Anselm Ritter von Feuerbach (57), a German legal scholar, died on 29 May 1833. The circumstances remain unclear – his family as well as he himself shortly before his death believed that he had been poisoned due to his protection of and research work on Kaspar Hauser, who himself died the same year under suspicious circumstances (see below).
- The events leading to the death of German youth Kaspar Hauser (21) remain a mystery, like many points regarding his life and identity. On 14 December 1833, he came home with a deep stab wound in his chest and died three days later. While he claimed he was attacked, the court of enquiry doubted this due to inconsistencies in his story and speculated that he wounded himself to seek attention and revive the fading public interest in him, a theory that is also supported by some historians today.
- Thomas Simpson (31) was a Scottish Arctic explorer, Hudson's Bay Company agent and cousin of Company Governor Sir George Simpson. His violent death in what is now the state of Minnesota allegedly by suicide after gunning down two traveling companions in the wilderness on 6 June 1840 has long been a subject of controversy and has never been solved.
- John Gregory (42) was an English engineer who served aboard HMS Erebus during the 1845 Franklin Expedition, which sought to explore uncharted parts of the Northwest Passage. He is believed to have died some time around May 1848. Gregory's remains were identified via DNA analysis in 2021, although his exact cause of death is undetermined.

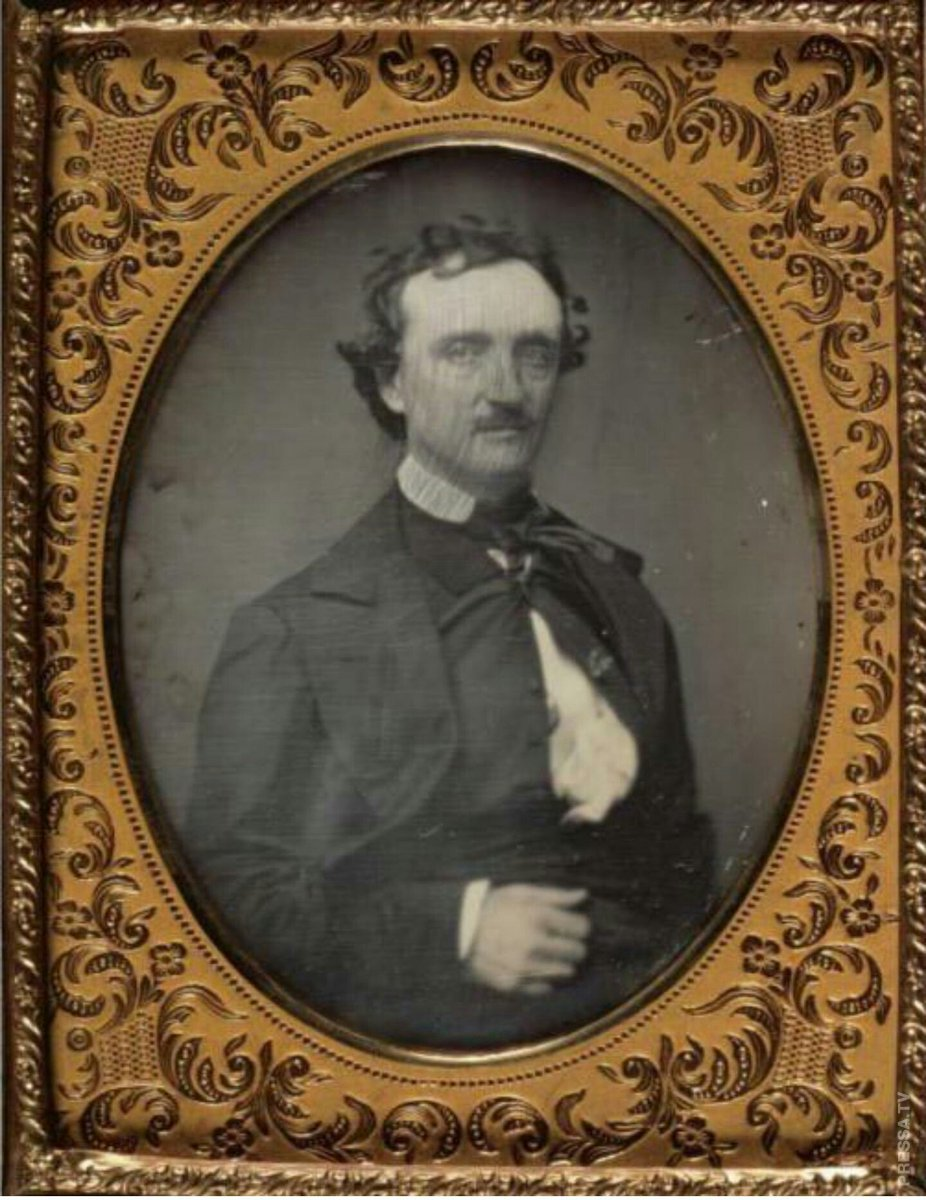
Edgar Allan Poe

- Edgar Allan Poe (40) US writer, editor, and literary critic, died on 7 October 1849 under circumstances that remain mysterious, and the cause of his death is disputed. On 3 October 1849, he was found delirious in Baltimore, "in great distress, and... in need of immediate assistance", according to the man who found him, Joseph W. Walker. He was taken to the Washington College Hospital, where he died days later.
- Sometime between 1849 and 1859, a skeleton was found on King William Island and thought to be that of Harry Goodsir (28–29), who disappeared in 1848. After testing the bones, it is believed that the cause of death was an infected tooth, but this was not confirmed. Also another discovered skeleton was thought to belong to Henry Thomas Dundas Le Vesconte (25–26), who disappeared along with Goodsir, aboard Franklin's lost expedition, but this was proven untrue. To whom it belonged and cause of death are unknown. Dundas Le Vesconte's body was found, but his cause of death is unknown.
- Richard H. Barter (26), a member of a stagecoach robbery gang active in California, was found dead outside Auburn on 12 July 1859. He had been ambushed and injured by law enforcement the day before, but it was unclear whether the fatal shot had been fired by the officers, or whether Barter had committed suicide or been given a mercy killing by his partners.
- Edward James Roye (57) was the first of Liberia's True Whig Party, who served as the fifth President of Liberia from 1870 until he was overthrown a year later and whose death followed on 11 February 1872. The circumstances of his death remain unknown.
- Zeng Guofan (60), a Chinese statesman, military general, and Confucian scholar of the late Qing dynasty. He is best known for raising and organizing the Xiang Army to aid the Qing military in suppressing the Taiping Rebellion and restoring the stability of the Qing Empire. Along with other prominent figures such as Zuo Zongtang and Li Hongzhang of his time, Zeng set the scene for the Tongzhi Restoration, an attempt to arrest the decline of the Qing dynasty. He died on 12 March 1872 of mysterious reasons.
- The Pimlico Mystery refers to the death of Thomas Edwin Bartlett (40) in Pimlico on January 1, 1886. A post-mortem discovered fatal quantities of chloroform in Bartlett's stomach, but also showed that Bartlett had not received any burns to his throat or windpipe as would be expected if he had drunk the chloroform, leaving it unclear how it came to be there. It has variously been theorised that Bartlett committed suicide, was murdered by his wife, accidentally consumed the chloroform believing it to be medicine, or overdosed while attempting to make himself ill, although none of these theories explain the lack of burns.
- L'Inconnue de la Seine was the name given to an unidentified young woman who, according to an oft-repeated story, was pulled out of the French River Seine at the Quai du Louvre in Paris around the late 1880s. Since the body showed no signs of violence, suicide was suspected.
- Vincent Van Gogh (37), a Dutch artist who was the rival to Paul Gauguin, was found dead in his hotel room at the Auberge Ravoux in Auvers-sur-Oise on July 29 1890. Sustaining a gunshot to his chest two days earlier, it is unknown who or what caused his death. While suicide was always in the question due to Van Gogh's known mental state, the placement of the wound did not make sense for suicide, so it's been widely speculated that he was accidentally shot by 16-year-old René Secrétan, who would often tease the artist.
- Composer Pyotr Ilyich Tchaikovsky (53) died in Saint Petersburg in November 1893 nine days after his Sixth Symphony, called the "Pathétique", had debuted. His cause of death is debated and remains unsolved.
- Barney Barnato (46), an English Randlord and entrepreneur who was a prominent rival to Cecil Rhodes, was found dead at sea near Madeira, Portugal on 14 June 1897. While suicide was the prevailing theory, his family rejected it, saying that it was unlike him to do such a thing.

=== 1900–1924 ===
- Sursinhji Takhtasinhji Gohil (26), popularly known by his pen name Kalapi, was a Gujarati poet and the Thakor (prince) of Lathi state in Gujarat who died on 9 June 1900. He is mostly known for his poems depicting his own pathos. It is believed that Kalapi's love for a woman named Shobhana became a source of conflict with their acquaintance Rajba-Ramaba and gave her a motive to poison him.
- Gaetano Bresci (31) was an Italian anarchist who assassinated King Umberto I of Italy in Monza on 29 July 1900. Due to capital punishment being abolished 11 years earlier, he was sentenced to penal servitude at Santo Stefano Island, where he was found dead in his cell on 22 May 1901. While his death was reported as being suicide by hanging, it is believed he was murdered.
- David Park Barnitz (23) was a US Harvard graduate and poet, who died on 10 October 1901 from unclear circumstances, as there are conflicting ideas about how he died.
- Paul Rée (51) was a German philosopher, author, and physician who died on 28 October 1901 after he fell into the Charnadüra Gorge in the Swiss Alps near Celerina when he was hiking. It is unknown whether it was a suicide or an accident.
- William Llewellyn (5), was a Welsh boy who disappeared on 11 April 1902, while he was in the Rhigos mountains and was found dead on 26 April 1902. His death cause is unknown.
- Émile Zola (62), French author who died on 29 September 1902 from carbon monoxide poisoning that was caused by a sealed chimney. His enemies were blamed for his death, but were not proven to have been actually responsible. It is also possible that Zola committed suicide.
- Gabriel Syveton (40), French politician and historian, was found dead in Neuilly-sur-Seine on 8 December 1904 in his office by gas poisoning. It is unknown whether this was a murder or suicide.
- On 14 March 1911 in the Belgian Ostend harbour, a deceased body was found that resembled Cecil Grace (30), who was a British pioneer aviator who disappeared on 22 December 1910 over the English Channel. The body could not be identified since it was too badly disfigured, and its identity and cause of death remain unknown.
- German inventor Rudolf Diesel (55) disappeared in the English Channel in 1913 and was found dead at sea 10 days later. His cause of death is debated.
- Tom Thomson (39) was a Canadian artist who was active in the early 20th century. Though his career was short, he managed to produce around 400 oil sketches on small wood panels, as well as around 50 larger works on canvas. Thomson disappeared on 8 July 1917 and was found dead a few days later. It is unknown whether his death was murder or suicide.

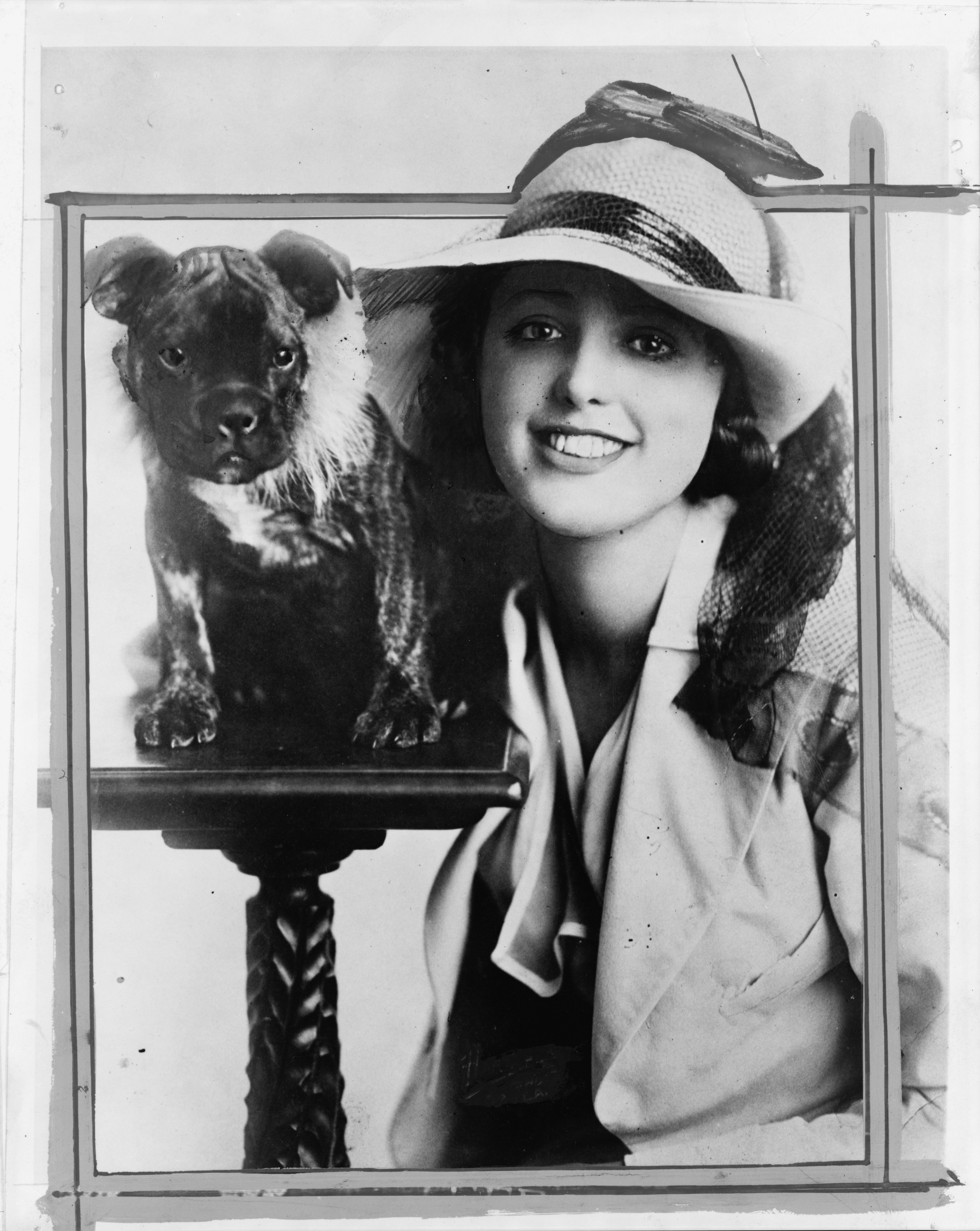
Silent film actress Virginia Rappe

- US silent film actress Virginia Rappe (30) was found to have died of peritonitis due to a ruptured bladder on 9 September 1921. While this could have resulted from ongoing health problems such as cystitis or complications from a recent abortion (illegal at the time), her acquaintance Maude Delmont told the San Francisco Police Department that silent film comedian Fatty Arbuckle sexually assaulted Rappe during a Labor Day party in his suite at the St. Francis Hotel, another possible cause of the ruptured bladder. Arbuckle was charged with rape and involuntary manslaughter but acquitted.
- In July 1922, an expedition was conducted during which a skeleton was discovered on the mainland shore across from Dikson Island. It is thought to be either Peter Tessem or Paul Knutsen. Its death cause is not known for certain.
- In 1923, an unidentified body on the grounds of an abandoned Argentinian Jesuit church in Corrientes whose death might have been caused by stabbing was found. It was thought to have been that of Alejandro Carrascosas (22), who had disappeared a year earlier. The body was never identified and the cause of the deceased's death is not known.
- Andrew Irvine (22), and George Mallory (37), were both British mountaineers who disappeared on 8 or 9 June 1924, while they were climbing mount Mount Everest. Mallory's remains were found in 1999. In October 2024 Irvine's partial remains were found. Their cause of death is unknown.

=== 1925–1949 ===
- Rudolf Steiner (64), Austrian esotericist who developed anthroposophy and Waldorf education, died from illness on 30 March 1925, but the nature of the illness was never confirmed and remains controversial, with theories suggesting cancer or poisoning as the most probable causes.
- Ottavio Bottecchia (32), 1927, Italian cyclist, was found by the side of a road, covered with bruises and with a serious skull fracture. His undamaged bicycle was discovered propped against a nearby tree. Bottecchia was taken to a hospital, but died soon afterwards. An official inquiry concluded accidental death, but it was suggested he had run afoul of the powerful and growing National Fascist Party in Italy at the time.
- José Rosario Oviedo (42), a Cuban rumba dancer known as "Malanga", died in 1927. The exact circumstances under which he died have never been known for certain. One common account has it that he was murdered after a dance contest through broken glass hidden in his food, but no death certificate was ever filed and the location of his grave is unknown.
- Frances Smith (18), was a US female teenage college student who disappeared on 13 January 1928 from Smith College in Massachusetts and was found dead from unknown causes on 29 March 1929.
- Pyotr Wrangel (49), was a Russian officer who died on 25 April 1928 from reasons that have been debated as his family stated that they think that he was poisoned by the butler of his brother. This was never proven for certain though.
- Alfred Loewenstein (51) was a Belgian financier who's believed to have fallen out of a plane's rear door while going to use the lavatory. He disappeared while crossing the North Sea on 4 July 1928, and his body was found in France 15 days later. His death cause is unknown.
- Starr Faithfull (25), a US Greenwich Village flapper, was found drowned on the beach at Long Beach on 8 June 1931. Although Faithfull had left a suicide note, her family contended that she was murdered by wealthy politician Andrew James Peters, former mayor of Boston, who had allegedly sexually abused Faithfull for years beginning when she was 11 years old and paid the Faithfulls to keep silent about it. Despite a lengthy investigation, it was never determined whether Faithfull's death was homicide, suicide, or accident.
- Geli Raubal (23), niece of Adolf Hitler, was found dead from a gunshot wound at Hitler's apartment in Munich on 18 September 1931. She had been shot in the chest with Hitler's gun. The death was ruled a suicide, but many of Hitler's political opponents questioned this verdict, alleging injuries on her body which did not fit this theory and that Raubal had been killed in the middle of a word in the letter she was writing, and noting that there was no autopsy and very little investigation before the case was closed by order of Minister of Justice Franz Gürtner, a political ally of Hitler. Modern researchers have presented multiple theories about Raubal's death, including that Hitler shot her by accident, that she was murdered or forced to kill herself to conceal sexual abuse by Hitler, or that she killed herself due to unrequited feelings for Hitler.
- Ivar Kreuger (52), a Swedish civil engineer, financier, entrepreneur and industrialist who died in a Paris hotel room on 12 March 1932. Though it was thought to have been a suicide it may also have been a murder.
- Jay Ferdinand Towner III (23), a US Princeton University undergraduate, was found dead on campus shortly after an 11 November 1933, football game. He had suffered broken wrists and severe internal injuries. His death was variously attributed to a fall suffered in the stands during the game or a car accident amid conflicting accounts of his whereabouts prior to his death; the exact cause has never been determined.

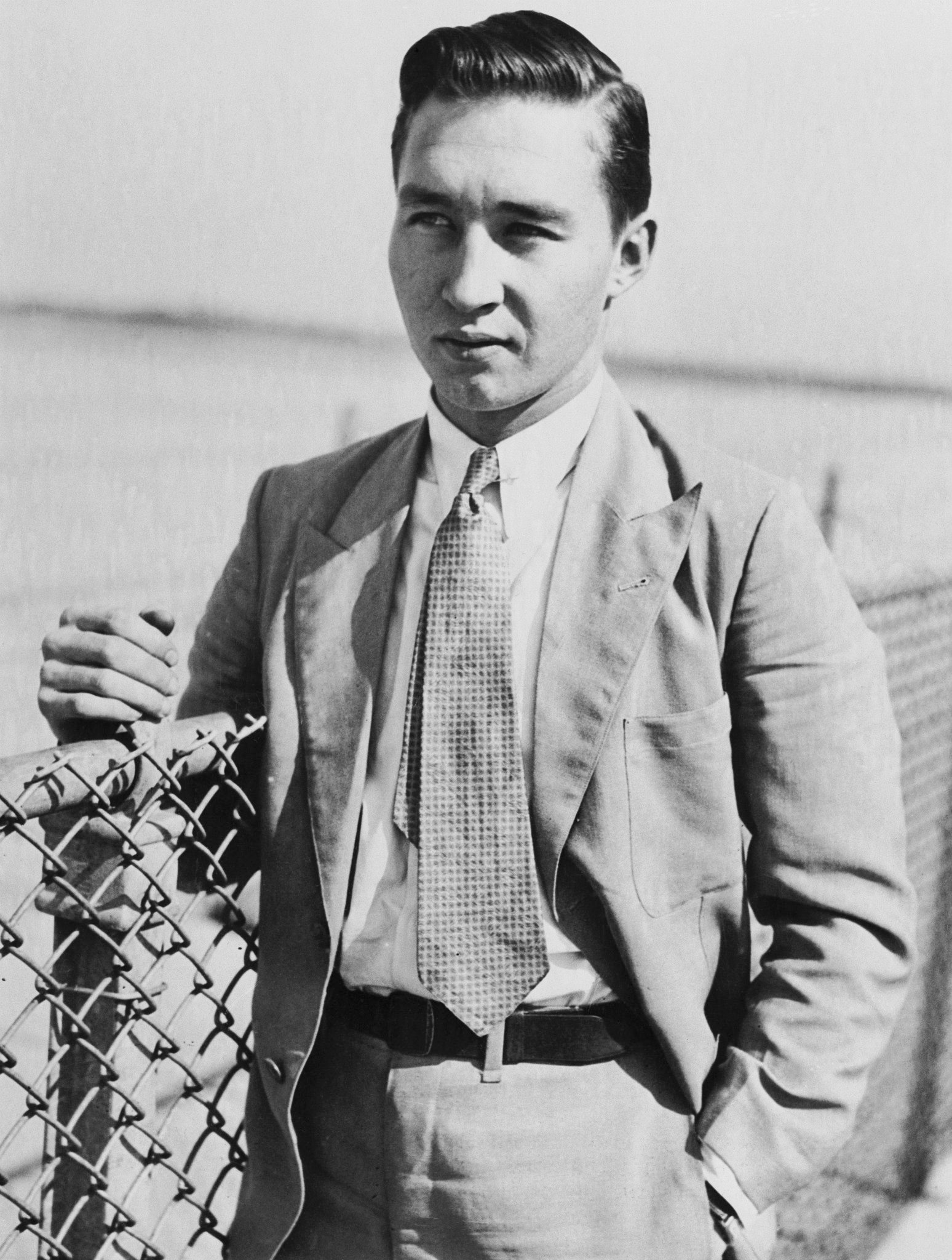
Zachary Smith Reynolds

- Zachary Smith Reynolds (20) was the son of US millionaire and businessman R. J. Reynolds. He died from a gunshot wound to the head on 6 July 1932, at his home in Winston-Salem, North Carolina. It is unclear if his death was a suicide or a murder.
- Paul Bern (42) was a US film director, screenwriter from Wandsbek, Hamburg, Germany. He became the assistant to Irving Thalberg after he became the producer for Metro-Goldwyn-Mayer. He was found dead in Beverly Hills, California on 5 September 1932 after being shot. Even though he left a note saying that he committed suicide it is also believed that his ex-common-law wife had killed him as she very shortly later herself committed suicide.
- Ivo Pilar (59), was a Croatian lawyer, politician, publicist, and historian who was found dead on 3 September 1933 at his home in Zagreb, Kingdom of Yugoslavia and it is unknown whether he was killed or if it was a suicide.
- Franziska Kessel (28) was a German politician who after being sent to jail in Mainz was found dead in her cell on 23 April 1934. It is unknown whether Kessel committed suicide or was murdered.
- Thelma Todd (29), was a US actress notable for appearing in multiple comedy films where she starred alongside Buster Keaton, Charley Chase, Laurel and Hardy and the Marx Brothers. On the morning of Monday, 16 December 1935, she was found dead in her car inside the garage of Jewel Carmen, a former actress and former wife of Todd's lover and business partner, Roland West. Her death was determined to have been caused by carbon monoxide poisoning. The exact circumstances of the case could not be determined and sparked wide speculations and theories. The case was officially closed as "accidental with possible suicide tendencies." It could never be determined and still sparks debate whether her death was accidental, suicide or murder.
- Robert Johnson (27), a US early blues singer and guitarist, died on 16 August 1938, near Greenwood. The cause was not officially recorded. He was reportedly in extreme pain and suffering from convulsions; this has led to theories he had been poisoned with strychnine by a jealous husband; however, the alleged poisoning is said to have taken place several days earlier and most strychnine deaths take place within hours of ingestion. Another report claims he died of syphilis or pneumonia. The uncertain location of his gravesite has made it impossible to exhume his body for further investigation.
- Kyrylo Studynsky (30–31) was a western Ukrainian cultural and political figure who was forced to leave Lviv in July 1941 and died shortly after from unknown reasons.
- Jeanette Loff (35) was a US actress, musician, and singer who came to prominence for her appearances in several Pathé Exchange and Universal Pictures films in the 1920s who died on 4 August 1942 from ammonia poisoning in Los Angeles. Though law enforcement was unable to determine whether her death was an accident or a suicide, Loff's family maintained that she had been murdered. The real cause behind her death remains unknown.
- Władysław Sikorski (62), prime minister of the Polish Government in exile, was among 16 people killed on 4 July 1943 when their plane crashed into the sea shortly after taking off from the Royal Air Force base at Gibraltar Airport. The plane had not managed to gain sufficient altitude due to its elevators being prevented from working properly; British investigators found the cause was most likely an accident while their Polish counterparts called it undetermined. The bodies of Sikorski's daughter, chief of staff and other key aides purportedly on the plane were never found. Sabotage and a possible assassination have been suspected, with Nazi Germany, the Soviet Union, the United Kingdom, or even rival factions in the Polish government in exile theorized to have been involved. Poland reopened the case in 2008; an exhumation of Sikorski's body found his injuries consistent with death from an air crash, ruling out some theories that he had been killed before being put on the plane, but the investigators still could not rule out the possibility of sabotage.
- A number of Nazis disappeared in the final days of Nazi Germany, and their whereabouts are either still unknown (with them likely now being dead), or their deaths occurred under unknown circumstances. For example, Martin Bormann's body was not found for 27 years (in 1972) and was not identified until 1998. Heinrich Müller has still not been located.
- Emil Hácha (72), a Czech lawyer, the third President of Czechoslovakia from 1938 to 1939, who died in Pankrác Prison on 27 June 1945 under mysterious circumstances, and his death cause remains unknown. Hácha had collaborated with the Nazis during the German occupation, and had been arrested by the Red Army after the liberation of Prague.
- Lipót Klug (91), a Jewish-Hungarian mathematician, professor who died towards the end of the Second World War on 24 March 1945 in what were said to have been strange circumstances, his true cause of death having never been revealed.
- King Ananda Mahidol of Thailand (20) died of gunshot wounds, either the product of suicide, accident or assassination, on 9 June 1946. Mahidol's successor (and younger brother) King Bhumibol Adulyadej, Prime Minister Pridi Banomyong, and the former Japanese intelligence officer Masanobu Tsuji have alternatively been accused of complicity.
- The Body in the cylinder refers to a male decedent discovered within a partially sealed steel cylinder on a derelict WWII bomb site in Liverpool, England. The discovery was made on 13 July 1945 and it is believed that the body had lain undiscovered for 60 years. Inquiries named a strong (but unconfirmed) candidate for the identity of the decedent; however, the cause of death and the reason for their presence in the cylinder remain a mystery.
- Alexander Alekhine (53), the fourth World Chess Champion, was found dead in a hotel room in Estoril, Portugal on 24 March 1946. Several causes of death have been proposed, but the two most likely are a heart attack or choking on a piece of meat which was found lodged in his throat in an autopsy.
- Vera West was a US fashion designer and film costume designer, who worked for Universal Pictures. She was found dead in her swimming pool on 29 June 1947, having possibly committed suicide by drowning, although police were never able to ascertain the precise circumstances surrounding her death.
- Kim Man-il (3–4), was the second son of North Korean founding leader Kim Il Sung and the younger brother of the second leader of North Korea Kim Jong Il, who in Pyongyang, Soviet Korea in either 1947 or 1948 is said to have drowned under conflicting circumstances.
- The Trow Ghyll skeleton, discovered in a cave in rural north Yorkshire, England in 1947, remains unidentified. The death probably occurred in 1941; the fact that the body was discovered with a glass bottle of cyanide has led to speculation that it was someone connected with espionage.

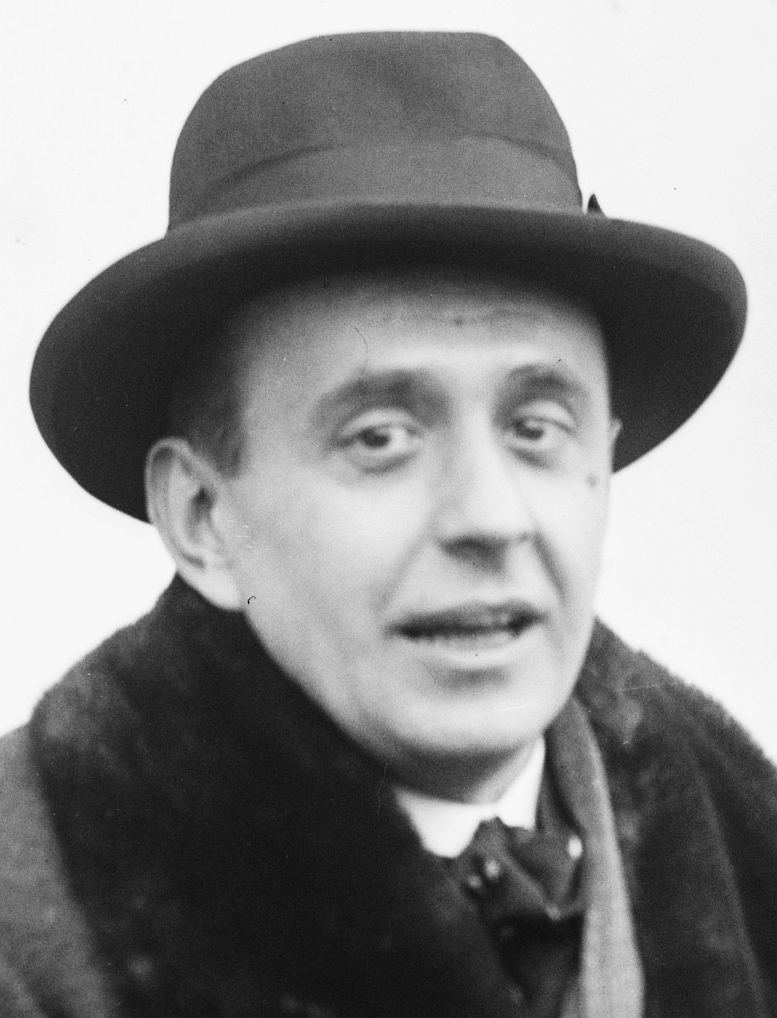
Jan Masaryk

- Jan Masaryk (61), 1948, son of Tomáš Garrigue Masaryk, Czech diplomat, politician and Foreign Minister of Czechoslovakia, was found dead in the courtyard of the Foreign Ministry below his bathroom window. The initial investigation concluded that he committed suicide by jumping out of the window, although many are convinced that he was pushed. A new investigation by the Czechoslovak government after the Velvet Revolution ruled his death a murder.
- Sadanori Shimoyama (47), 1948, first director of Japanese National Railways, was last seen leaving his official car to go into a department store on his way to work the morning of 5 July of that year. Others reported seeing him at various train stations, and walking along one line, that afternoon. His dismembered body was found at noon the next day on the Jōban Line. It had indisputably gotten that way as a result of being struck by a train, but the autopsy suggested he had died before being struck. That conclusion has been disputed, and whether his death was a suicide or murder remains undetermined.
- Irwin Foster Hilliard (85) was a Canadian political figure and lawyer in Ontario who was last seen on 23 November 1948 before going on a shopping trip. He was found dead on 22 December 1948 close to Lambton. His death cause is unknown.
- Nora Gregor (47), whose full name was "Eleonora Hermina Gregor", was an Austrian actress who acted both on stage and in movies who died on 20 January 1949 in Viña del Mar from a debated cause.

=== 1950–1974 ===
- Syama Prasad Mukherjee (52), an Indian politician, died in a prison hospital 23 June 1953, one and a half months after his arrest for attempting to enter Jammu and Kashmir without a permit. The exact cause of death has never been disclosed; Prime Minister Jawaharlal Nehru, from whose government Mukherjee had resigned in protest over Nehru's decision to normalise relations with Pakistan despite that country's treatment of its Hindu population, said he made inquiries and was satisfied that his former minister's death was due to natural causes; speculation has continued that Mukherjee was murdered due to some unusual circumstances of his arrest and treatment.
- Raimondo Lanza di Trabia (39) was an Italian man who was successful in many fields. On 30 November 1954 in Rome, Lanza di Trabia died from circumstances that are suspicious after he fell out of a hotel room window.
- Herman Schultheis (33) was a US technician and photographer who worked for Walt Disney Studios who disappeared on 20 May 1955 near Tikal, Guatemala. His remains were found on 23 November 1956, along with some of his belongings. His death cause is unknown.
- The Dyatlov Pass incident was the deaths of nine hikers on the Russian Kholat Syakhl mountain in the northern Ural Mountains range on 2 February 1959; the bodies were not recovered until that May. While most of the victims were found to have died of hypothermia after apparently abandoning their tent high on an exposed mountainside, two had fractured skulls, two had broken ribs, and one was missing her tongue. There were no witnesses or survivors to provide any testimony, and the cause of death was listed as a "compelling natural force", most likely an avalanche, by Soviet investigators.

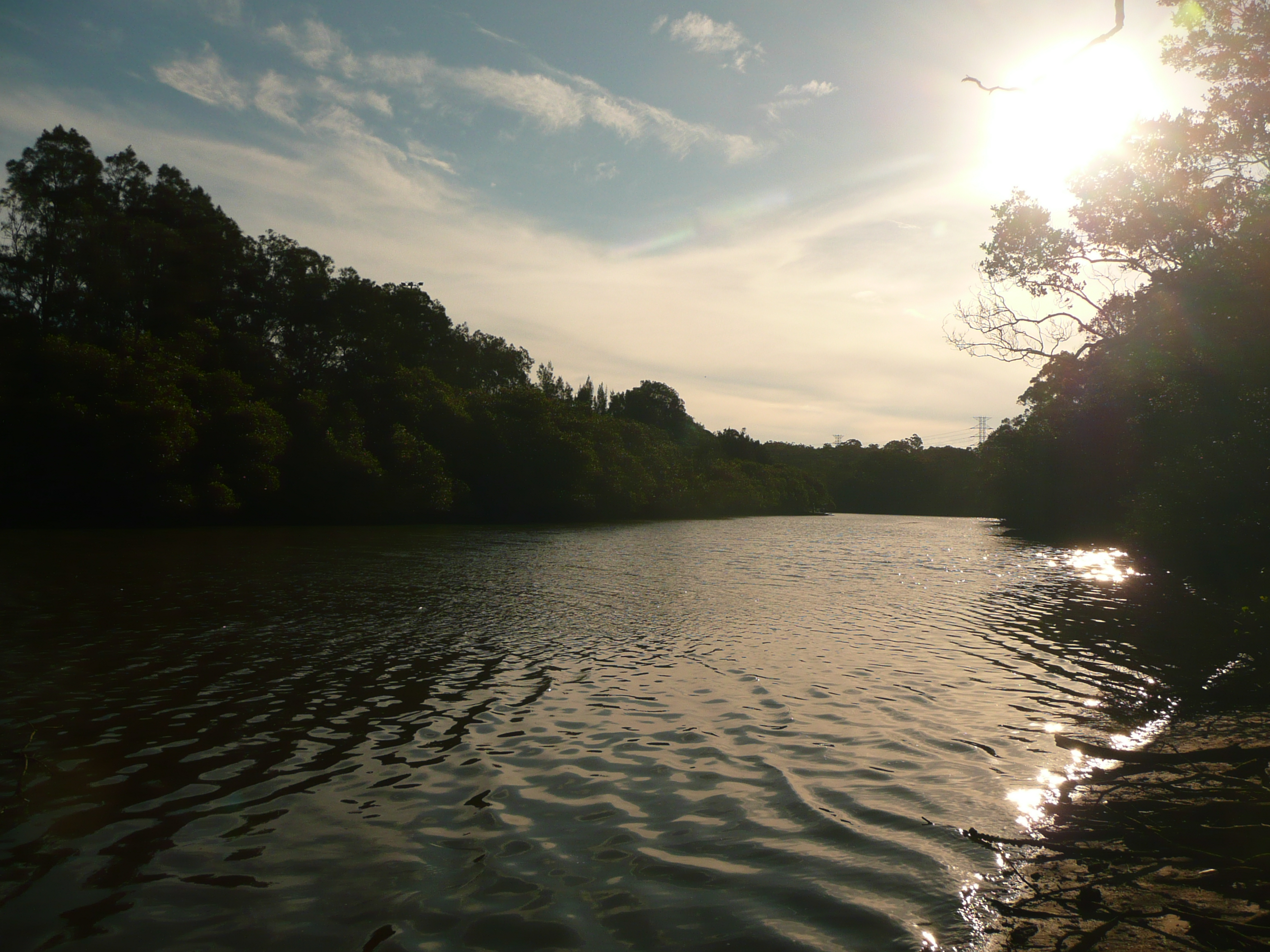
The Lane Cove River. The bodies of Dr Gilbert Bogle and Margaret Chandler were discovered at this location on 1 January 1963

- Barthélemy Boganda (48), who was Prime Minister of the Central African Republic, died on 29 March 1959 in Boukpayanga during a mysterious plane crash.
- Diana Barrymore (38), daughter of actor John Barrymore, was a US stage and movie actress and a relative of US actress Drew Barrymore. On 25 January 1960, she died in her hometown of New York City. At first her death was said to be the result of a drug overdose. After an autopsy was conducted, this was proven to be untrue. Speculation included a theory that she had committed suicide, but this was never proven. She had admitted publicly she was a recovering alcoholic. In July 1957, she gave a US television interview to Mike Wallace in which she said, "At the moment, I don't drink. I hope to be able, one day, in perhaps the near future [or] the very distant future, to be able to drink like a normal human being. That may never be possible."
- Dag Hammarskjöld (56), a Swedish economist and diplomat who served as the second Secretary-General of the United Nations, died on 18 September 1961 in Ndola, Northern Rhodesia in a mysterious plane crash.
- Lucas Samalenge (33), a Katangese and Congolese politician who died under suspicious circumstances on 19 November 1961 in Lubumbashi.
- Dr Gilbert Stanley Bogle (39) and Margaret Olive Chandler (29) were found dead, both partially undressed, near the banks of the Lane Cove River in Sydney, Australia, on 1 January 1963. Their bluish pallor and the presence of vomit and excrement led to a finding that they were poisoned, but the coroner could not identify the toxin. Murder (possibly by Chandler's husband) was suspected, but no suspect has ever been identified. A 2006 TV documentary suggested their deaths were not due to foul play but the result of hydrogen sulfide gas leaking from the river bed and reaching dangerously high concentrations in the low-lying depressions where their bodies were found.
- The death certificate of US Dorothy Kilgallen (52) states that she died on 8 November 1965 from "acute ethanol and barbiturate intoxication / circumstances undetermined." She was famous in the United States as a syndicated newspaper columnist and radio/television personality, most notably as a regular panelist on the longest running game show in history at the time, CBS's What's My Line. The New York City medical examiner James Luke categorized the cause of death as "circumstances undetermined."
- Hedviga Golik (42) was a Croatian woman from Zagreb, who in 1966 sat down in front of her TV with a cup of tea and died from unknown reasons. Her body was discovered 42 years later when the police entered her apartment.
- Lal Bahadur Shastri (61), an Indian politician who was the second Prime Minister of India, mysteriously died on 11 January 1966, just hours after signing the Tashkent Declaration. His death cause is disputed.
- The Lead Masks Case involves the death of two Brazilian electronic technicians, Manoel Pereira da Cruz and Miguel José Viana, whose bodies were discovered on 20 August 1966, in Niterói, Rio de Janeiro, Brazil. After an autopsy was performed the cause of death could not be proven since the organs were too badly decomposed.
- Alvar Larsson (13) was a Swedish boy who disappeared on 16 April 1967 while going for a walk. In November 1982, a human skull was found on a small island 6 km away that was identified as belonging to Larsson. The disappearance attracted a lot of media coverage at the time and many theories as to what happened have been put forward. Thomas Quick has confessed to the crime, but has since recanted all his confessions.
- Joan Robinson Hill (38) was a US socialite who died in 1969. At first ruled to have died of influenza following a brief hospitalization on 19 March, suspicions arose when her body was released to the funeral home and embalmed before a legally required autopsy could occur. Despite the compromised evidence, three autopsies, all with their own irregularities, were performed and her husband John eventually became the only person indicted by a Texas grand jury for murder by omission, or failing to take proper action in the face of a life-threatening situation. The first attempt to prosecute him ended in a mistrial in 1972; he was murdered before he could be retried and the gunman suspected of his murder died in a police shootout. Two other alleged accomplices were later convicted.
- Edward Mutesa (45), who was Kabaka of the Kingdom of Buganda in Uganda, died on 21 November 1969 from alcohol poisoning, in his London flat. He may have committed suicide or been poisoned by someone.
- Katherine Walsh (23), US actress who died in London, England on 7 October 1970 while she was at a party at her home. While it is known that she died from barbiturate poisoning and alcohol, it is unknown whether it was a suicide or accident.

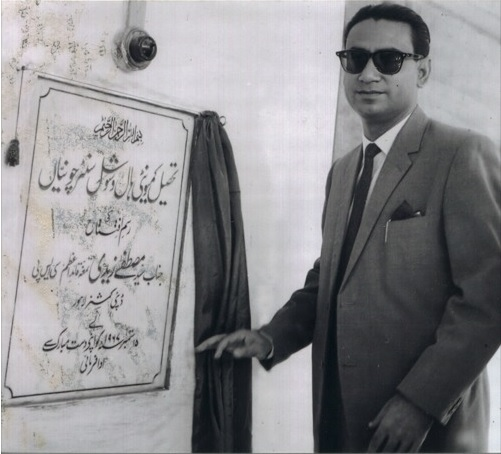
Mustafa Zaidi died of unknown causes on 12 October 1970

- Mustafa Zaidi (40), Pakistani Urdu poet from India who died in Karachi from unknown reasons on 12 October 1970. The case has never been solved.
- Ronald Hughes (35), a US attorney who disappeared while on a camping trip in November 1970. He had been representing Leslie Van Houten in the Tate–LaBianca murder trial. His body was found in March 1971, but his cause of death could not be determined.
- The Isdal Woman was a partially charred unidentified corpse found on 29 November 1970, hidden off a hiking trail near Bergen, Norway. The official conclusion that her death was a suicide has not been widely accepted, since some believed she was murdered. Her identity remains unknown and is considered one of Norway's most profound mysteries. The case has been the subject of intense speculation for many years. Multiple investigations point to the possibility that she was a spy.
- Michael O'Sullivan (37), a US man who had a brief, but successful acting career, was found dead at his apartment in San Francisco, California, on 24 July 1971 with a bottle of sleeping pills next to him from what may have been a death by suicide.
- Italian Giangiacomo Feltrinelli (45), who had during the 1950s published the smuggled manuscript of Boris Pasternak's novel Doctor Zhivago, but later became a left-wing militant during Italy's Years of Lead, was found dead at the base of a power-line transmission tower outside Segrate, near his native Milan, on 15 March 1972. It was believed that he had died when a bomb he was attempting to plant on the tower went off, and later testimony by members of the Red Brigades supported this. However, the death was always viewed suspiciously, and in the 2010s forensic reports surfaced that suggested he had been tied to the tower before the bomb went off, with various intelligence agencies inside and outside of Italy suspected of responsibility.
- Gia Scala (38) was a US model and actress from Liverpool, Merseyside, England who on 30 April 1972 was found dead in her house in the Hollywood Hills. Her cause of death remains undetermined.
- Nigel Green (47) was a character actor who was born in South Africa, and was raised in London, England, who died in Brighton, Sussex on 15 May 1972 after taking too many sleeping pills. It is unknown if this was a suicide or not.
- Amaryllis Garnett was an English actress and diarist who appeared in various productions in the 1960s, with her most notable appearance being Judith of Balbec from the original 1966 version of A Choice of Kings. With the onset of the 1970s, however, she fell into a deep depression, and on 6 May 1973 she was found drowned in the Chelsea river. Whether her drowning was accidental or a suicide remains unclear.
- Kafundanga Chingunji served as the first chief of staff in the government of UNITA, pro-Western rebels, during the Angolan Civil War. Officially, Chingunji died from cerebral malaria in January 1974 on Angola's border with Zambia. His wife and others who saw his body say someone poisoned Chingunji. Rumors later alleged Jonas Savimbi, the head of UNITA, ordered his assassination. It is unknown for sure what the exact circumstances of his death were.
- Karen Silkwood (28), a US nuclear power whistleblower, died in a car accident on 13 November 1974, while driving to a meeting with a New York Times reporter in Oklahoma City. Whether that accident involved another vehicle, whose driver may have deliberately run her off the road, or resulted from her own fatigue, remains a matter of debate.
- Aman Andom (50) was an Ethiopian military figure and was the acting head of state of Ethiopia who died on 23 November 1974. Sources say that he died by suicide, while others say that he was killed by political rivals among the coup leadership, possibly including Mengistu Haile Mariam.

=== 1975–1989 ===
- Joachim Peiper (61), charred remains of formerly well-known World War II figure, a Standartenführer of Waffen-SS and a battle-group commander within 1st SS Panzer Division Leibstandarte SS Adolf Hitler, were found at his burned-out estate at the village of Traves, Haute-Saône, France, on 14 July 1976 (a French national holliday), on which he subtly settled-in four years earlier (1972) and lived under nom de guerre. Before death, he had received various threats by French political activists since his real identity was discovered in 1974. It is assumed that he died due to asphyxia caused by fire, however, because of condition of the body, investigators could not exactly confirm whether he actually died in arson or was shot and killed before his assassin(s) had set the house on fire. Furthermore, due to lack on forensic analysis, some French investigators proved suspicious that the found remains were indeed the ones of Peiper, believing to be a potentially faked death in order for him to vanish from publicity he was caught-in recently. Also, despite the fact that members of French far-left political group The Avengers (allegedly tied to French Communist Party) claimed responsibility for the attack, perpetrators have never been reliably determined as no-one was ever arrested and convicted, so it remains unclear who ultimately planned and carried out the murder.
- Sandra Mozarowsky (18), a Spanish teenage actress, who on 14 September 1977 fell to her death from her balcony in Madrid. It is unknown if she died by suicide or if she fell by accident.
- Manon Dubé (10) was a Canadian girl from Quebec, who vanished while sledding with friends in Massawippi on 27 January 1978. Her body was found on 24 March 1978, but the exact cause of death was never determined.
- The Yuba County Five were a group of young men from Yuba County, United States, each with mild intellectual disabilities or psychiatric conditions, who were reported missing after attending a college basketball game at California State University, Chico (also known as Chico State), on the night of 24 February 1978. Four of them—Bill Sterling, 29; Jack Huett, 24; Ted Weiher, 32; and Jack Madruga, 30—were later found dead; the fifth, Gary Mathias, 25, has never been found. Their causes to the lead-up of their disappearances and deaths are still unknown.
- Marcia Moore (50), a writer on yoga and astrology, disappeared near her home in the Seattle, Washington area during the winter of 1979. In 1981 her skeletal remains were found in nearby woods. It has been presumed in the absence of any evidence that would more conclusively establish a cause of death that she died of hypothermia while wandering the woods under the influence of ketamine, a drug whose use she had promoted. However, true-crime writer Ann Rule, a friend, says what appeared to be a bullet hole was found in her jawbone, although authorities said it could just as easily have been a result of the bone decaying during the cold winters. Officially the cause of Moore's death remains undetermined.
- Marin Preda (57) was a Romanian director of Cartea Românească publishing house who wrote novels about wars that had ended. Preda was found dead on 16 May 1980 at Mogoșoaia Palace from asphyxiation.
- On 11 June 1980, the body of Zigmund Adamski (56), a coal miner who had emigrated from Poland to the English town of Tingley, was found on top of a coal pile by Todmorden police. He had disappeared from Tingley five days prior after leaving to go on a shopping trip, with post-mortem tests determining that he had died of a heart attack and had sustained burns to his neck, shoulders and the back of his head that were covered in an unknown green ointment. The events leading up to his death, or how he ended up on the coal pile, have never been determined; one popular theory maintains that he was the victim of an alien abduction, while others speculate that he died after being kidnapped by a relative who had been embroiled in a feud with the Adamski family.
- Douglas Crofut (38) was a US radiographer who died of both radiation poisoning and radiation burns on 27 July 1981 in Tulsa, Oklahoma. The event is thought to have been either a suicide or an accident, but this remains uncertain.

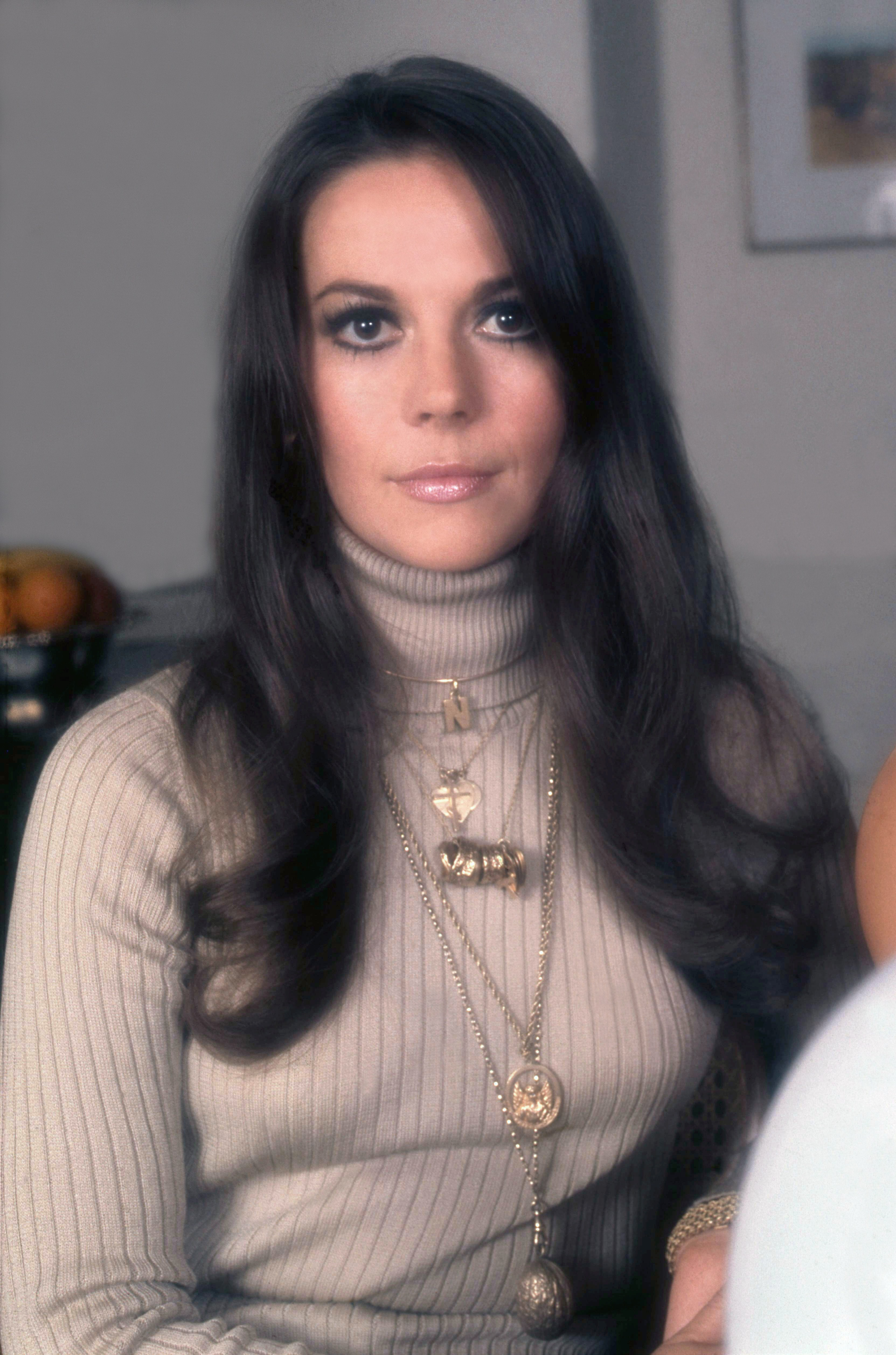
Natalie Wood. Her husband has been named as a person of interest in her death

- On 29 November 1981, actress Natalie Wood (43), who was a passenger on the yacht owned by her and her husband Robert Wagner, was found drowned near Santa Catalina Island, California. Two other people were on board the Wagners' yacht at the time: actor Christopher Walken and Dennis Davern, a longtime employee of the Wagners who served as skipper of the yacht. While drowning has always been accepted as the direct cause of her death, the circumstances under which she went into the water have never been clear. After reopening the investigation in 2012 the coroner changed the cause of death from "accident" to "undetermined" based on cuts and bruises on her body that may or may not have been suffered before her death. In 2018 Wagner was identified as a person of interest.
- Don Kemp (34–35) was a New York advertising executive who disappeared under mysterious circumstances in Wyoming in 1982, where he had planned to begin a new life. His remains were discovered in 1986, but the circumstances surrounding his death, and whether or not it was homicidal, remain unclear.
- Eduardo Frei Montalva (71), who was president of Chile from 1964 to 1970, died on 22 January 1982. As of 2005, his death is being investigated because of allegations that he was poisoned.
- The cause of death of the baby born to Joanne Hayes in Ireland's 1984 Kerry Babies case was never established.
- Radomir Radović (32–33), a Yugoslav civil engineering technician and trade unionist who advocated for an independent trade union in the country, was found dead at his villa in Orašac on 30 April 1984. While the ruling party claimed that he had died by suicide, this claim was disputed by fellow intellectuals, and his true cause of death remains unclear.
- 25-year old Japanese office worker Kenji Iwamura purportedly died during the 1984–1990 SOS incident.
- Ana Mendieta (36), a Cuban-American feminist artist, died on 8 September 1985 after falling out of the window of her New York City apartment under unclear circumstances. Her husband, Carl Andre, said that she killed herself; he was charged with her murder but was found not guilty at a bench trial, the judge finding that it was not proven whether or not she was murdered.
- Samora Machel (53), a Mozambican politician, military commander, and revolutionary, was killed on 19 October 1986 in a mysterious plane crash close to the Mozambican-South African border.
- Cam Lyman (54–55) was a US multimillionaire dog breeder from Westwood, who disappeared in the summer of 1987. In December 1997 his body was found in a septic tank on his estate in Hopkinton, Rhode Island by the new owners of the house. Lyman's death remains a mystery.
- On 11 October 1987, West German Christian Democratic Union politician Uwe Barschel (43) was found dead and fully clothed in a filled bathtub in his room at the Hotel Beau-Rivage in Geneva, Switzerland. Lorazepam and other drugs were found in his system. The circumstances of his death remain unclear and controversial, with suicide or murder both considered possible explanations and the case still being investigated.
- Pakistani president Muhammad Zia-ul-Haq (64), the country's longest-serving leader, and 30 others, including the country's top military leaders and the US ambassador, were killed in a 17 August 1988 plane crash. Whether it was an accident or foul play, the result of sabotage or a shootdown, is a matter of debate. US investigators came to the former conclusion, while their Pakistani counterparts produced a report reaching the latter. Theories as to responsibility if it were an act of malice have put the blame on a number of domestic and foreign actors.
- On 8 June 1989, Canadian nurse Cindy James (44) was found dead of a multiple-drug overdose in the yard of an abandoned house in the Vancouver suburb of Richmond, hogtied and with a nylon stocking around her neck. During the seven years leading up to her death, she had made approximately 100 reports to police of incidents of stalking, harassment, vandalism, and physical attacks. Despite significant investigation, authorities could find no evidence pointing to an assailant, and it was suspected that James had fabricated the incidents herself, culminating in an elaborate staged suicide. The cause of death was found to be a drug overdose due to the extraordinarily high levels of morphine, diazepam and other drugs found in her system, but exactly how that came about could not be determined.
- Said S. Bedair (40) was an Egyptian scientist in electrical, electronic and microwave engineering and a colonel in the Egyptian army. He died on 14 July 1989 in Alexandria of unclear circumstances, though his wife thinks it might have been a suicide.
- Duncan MacPherson (23), was a Canadian professional ice hockey player who disappeared 9 August 1989 when he went on a trip to Austria, In 2003 his body was found on a mountain where he had gone snowboarding and his death cause is unknown.

=== 1990–1999 ===
- Donna Marie Prudhomme (34) disappeared from Nassau Bay, Texas, US, in July 1991 and was found dead on 8 September 1991. Her cause of death is unknown.
- Berlin police were called to a Lichtenberg apartment on the night of 3 December 1991 after neighbors complained of loud arguments, barking dogs and a parade of men coming and going. Inside they found the body of Beate Ulbricht (47), adopted daughter of Walter Ulbricht, the first Communist leader of East Germany, by then defunct. Visible facial injuries suggested a death by blunt force trauma, but whether that had resulted from an accident or foul play has never been determined. She had recently given a series of interviews about her family life in which she recalled her mother, Lotte, as harsh and unloving, in contrast to her late father; Lotte was unsurprised when a reporter informed her of Beate's death. The unsolved stabbing death two years later of a man thought to be Beate's lover in her last years may be connected.
- A skull fragment found in a wooded area of Baldwin, Pennsylvania in 1992 turned out to be that of Michael Rosenblum (25), of nearby Pittsburgh, who had not been seen since 14 February 1980, near where the bone was found. While the cause of death could not be determined, circumstantial evidence accumulated over the years suggested that Baldwin's police department had covered up its own officers' involvement in Rosenblum's disappearance; the chief had been fired and reinstated a short time later over the allegations.
- The remains of US boy Timothy Wiltsey (5), of South Amboy, New Jersey, were found in a muddy brook behind an office park in nearby Edison on 23 April 1992, almost a year after his mother Michelle Lodzinski reported him missing from a carnival. Decomposition was too advanced to determine how Wiltsey had died. Suspicion accumulated around Lodzinski in later years owing to reports that she had changed her account of his disappearance several times, and her conviction for an attempt to stage her own kidnapping in 1994 followed by another conviction for theft several years later. In 2014 she was arrested for her son's murder and convicted after trial two years later, but the state Supreme Court vacated that conviction in 2021 for insufficient evidence.
- Marsha P. Johnson (46) was a US gay rights activist who on 6 July 1992 was found dead floating in the Hudson River in New York. It is unknown whether she died by suicide or was murdered.
- Chris McCandless (24), US hiker who after going hiking in Alaska in 1992 was found dead in August 1992, possibly due to starvation, but it is not known for sure how he died.
- US couple Arnold Archambeau (20) and Ruby Bruguier (18) left a passenger behind in their overturned car following an accident before dawn on 12 December 1992 outside Lake Andes, South Dakota. They were never seen alive again; almost three months later their bodies were found near the accident site. Police do not believe they were there during the intervening winter months as they were not found during several searches of the area. Autopsies attributed the deaths to hypothermia; however Bruguier's body was in a far more advanced stage of decomposition and other evidence at the scene has reinforced investigators' belief that the two died elsewhere and their bodies were moved there. The FBI investigated as well, due to the victims being Native Americans and the incident taking place on a reservation, but closed their file in 1999 having found insufficient evidence that a crime occurred.
- David Glenn Lewis (52) was found dead on 1 February 1993, the victim of a hit and run, shortly after he was seen wandering on Washington State Route 24 in Moxee, Washington, just outside Yakima. The town of Moxee is 2,600 km (1,600 mi) from Lewis's home in Amarillo, Texas; evidence conflicts as to whether he was there for the preceding two days or traveled from the city. At the time of his death, he was wearing clothing his family said was not his. His body remained unidentified until 2004. The driver of the vehicle that struck him also remains unidentified, and since his presence in the Yakima area has not been explained, whether his death was an accident, suicide, or foul play cannot be determined.
- Divya Bharti was an Indian actress known for Bollywood films in the early 90s. She was the first co-actress of successful actor Sharukh Khan. She accidentally fell from the 5th floor of her building on 5 April 1993 at the age 19. The mystery surrounding her death remained unsolved, creating conspiracy theories regarding her family, social life, and husband Sajid Nadiadwala.
- Mansour Rashid El-Kikhia was a Libyan politician and human rights activist known for his opposition to Muammar Gaddafi's regime. On 10 December 1993, he was kidnapped while on a diplomatic visit to Cairo, Egypt, allegedly by Libyan Mukhabarat operatives. His fate remained unclear until October 2012, when his body was found in a refrigerator in Tripoli, indicating that he had likely died while in custody.
- Zviad Gamsakhurdia (54), former president of Georgia, died on 31 December 1993 from circumstances that remain very unclear. It is known that he died in the village of Khibula in the Samegrelo region of western Georgia.
- On 27 April 1994, British actress Lynne Frederick (39) was found dead by her mother in her West Los Angeles home. Foul play and suicide were ruled out and an autopsy failed to determine the cause of death. Some in the media speculated she died from the effects of alcoholism. Her remains were cremated at Golders Green Crematorium in London, and her ashes were interred with those of her first husband, Peter Sellers.
- Oscar Gomez, US student and activist during the 1990s, died under mysterious circumstances on 16 November 1994 in Santa Barbara, California, while he was protesting with his fellow students.
- Sonja Engelbrecht (19) was a young woman who went missing on the night of 10–11 April 1995 in Munich, and whose remains were first discovered on 23 November 2021. Her cause of death remains unknown.
- Caroline Byrne (24), an Australian model, was found at the bottom of a cliff at The Gap in Sydney on 8 June 1995. Her boyfriend at the time of her death was charged with killing her and was convicted, but was acquitted of the conviction in February 2012 as the decision was overturned. It is unclear whether her death was a murder or suicide.
- Carl Isaacs Jr. (21), formerly known Rock County John Doe, and also commonly referred as John Clinton Doe, was the name given to a now-identified set of skeletal remains of a young adult white male found alongside Turtle Creek near Clinton, Wisconsin, on 26 November 1995. His death cause is also unknown.
- English actor Barry Evans (53) died on 9 February 1997. The police went to his house to inform him that they had recovered his stolen car, which was reported the day before, but he was found dead in his home. The coroner found a blow to Evans' head and also found high levels of alcohol in his system. A short will was found on a table next to his body and a spilt packet of aspirin tablets, bearing a pre-decimalisation price tag, indicating that the pack was at least 26 years old, was found on the floor, although the coroner concluded that he had not taken any of them. The cause of his death was never confirmed.
- US screenwriter Gary DeVore (55) left Santa Fe, New Mexico, on 28 June 1997, for Hollywood to deliver his final draft of a script for a remake of The Big Steal, a 1950 film in part about a man who stages his own disappearance. He never arrived and was considered missing for a year until his body was found in his car in the California Aqueduct. His hands were missing, and from its position the car did not appear to have entered the waterway after an accident. No cause of death has been established.
- Ricky Reel (21), a computer science student at Brunel University, was last seen alive in the early morning of 15 October 1997; his body was recovered from the River Thames six days later. Although the Metropolitan Police initially declared his death accidental, an open verdict was later returned. Speculation remains as to a racial motive behind his death.
- Unnamed Japanese man (69), was a man who died in his home in 1998 in Japan from unknown reasons and was found dead in 2000 when people entered his home.
- Theodore Sindikubwabo, interim president during the Rwanda genocide, died in 1998. Cause of death is unknown, but it has been speculated that he died of HIV or was killed by Interahamwe hardliners.
- Patricia Lee Partin was among four US women who left Los Angeles, and disappeared alongside Florinda Donner in 1998; her remains were found in the desert sands of Death Valley in 2003. Partin's cause of death remains unknown.
- Greek philosopher Dimitris Liantinis (55) disappeared on 1 June 1998. In July 2005, human bones were found in the area of the mountain Taygetos; forensic examinations verified that it was the body of Liantinis. No lethal substances were found to identify the cause of death.
- Sani Abacha (54), military dictator of Nigeria, died on 8 June 1998. A popular theory in Nigeria is that he died after consuming a poisoned apple, but a confidants reported that after shaking hands with a visiting Yasser Arafat, he began feeling unwell and died shortly afterward.
- Kevin Hjalmarsson (4), a Swedish boy who went missing was found dead in Arvika on 16 August 1998. Though he was originally thought to have been murdered, it is now claimed by the police that he is thought to have died in an unknown accident.
- Bardhyl Çaushi (62–63), a Kosovo Albanian activist and human rights lawyer, was kidnapped in 1999 by Yugoslav forces and found dead in 2005 from reasons that could not be determined.
- Viacheslav Chornovil (61), a prominent Ukrainian politician, died in a car crash under unclear circumstances on 25 March 1999. His political allies and supporters have alleged that he was killed by members of a Ministry of Internal Affairs unit on the orders of President Leonid Kuchma to ensure his victory in the 1999 Ukrainian presidential election. Investigations into whether Chornovil was murdered or died accidentally have closed and reopened on several occasions without a conclusion.
- William DaShawn Hamilton (6) was a US child whose skeletal remains were found near a cemetery near Atlanta in 1999. His mother was convicted in 2024 of concealing (but not of causing) his death — his cause of death is unknown.
- Yves Godard (43) was a French doctor who, along with his son and daughter, disappeared on a sailing trip in September 1999. A skull fragment belonging to his daughter Camille was found in 2000; six years later bone fragments belonging to Godard were found in the English Channel. No trace of his son or Godard's boat has been found. His wife, who did not go on the sailing trip and stayed at home, also disappeared at the same time. Investigators found traces of blood in the family home and in Godard's caravan, raising suspicion that Godard's wife was murdered. In 2012, the case was closed without charges. Prosecutors ruled out accidental death and believe that Godard probably murdered his family before committing suicide at sea, but acknowledge that they are not certain of this.
- Hangthong Thammawattana (49), a Thai businessman and politician, was found dead from a gunshot wound in the early hours of 6 September 1999 in his family's mansion. It is unknown if it was a suicide or murder.
- Jaryd Atadero (3) was a US boy who went missing on 2 October 1999 in Colorado in the Arapaho & Roosevelt National Forest. On 6 May 2003, some of his remains were discovered by two businessmen while they were hiking. Though there are different theories to how he died, the true cause is not known.
- Late on 22 October 1999, Davina Buff Jones (33), an officer with the Bald Head Island, North Carolina, United States, police department, was heard on the radio stating she was in the presence of three unidentified individuals at a location she did not disclose and then apparently telling one of them to put down a gun (which local law forbids civilians from carrying). Her partner found her near Old Baldy Lighthouse a short time later lying dead on the ground with a gunshot wound in the back of her head. The death was originally ruled a suicide as investigators found no evidence of a struggle or anyone else at the scene; but while she had a history of mental illness and a previous suicide attempt, had just broken up with her boyfriend and was doubtful she had a future with the department due to problems with residents and her coworkers, her family and friends saw it as unlikely since she left no note and had made a list of things she intended to do the following day. In 2011 the Brunswick County district attorney reopened the case due to the sloppy forensics in the original investigation which might have irreversibly compromised it; two years later the ruling was changed to undetermined. A North Carolina labor agency has ruled the death a homicide for liability purposes

=== 2000–2009 ===
- Lolo Ferrari (37) was a French dancer, singer and film actress who also performed in pornography and was known for her large surgically enhanced breasts. Ferrari was found deceased on the morning of 5 March 2000 of causes never determined.
- Erin Foster (18) and Jeremy Bechtel (17) were a teenage couple from Sparta, Tennessee, who disappeared on 3 April 2000 after leaving a party. In 2021, they were both found dead in a car underwater. What led up to the event is unknown.
- Rodney Marks (32), an Australian astrophysicist, died of a sudden illness on 12 May 2000 at Amundsen–Scott South Pole Station in Antarctica. His body could not be flown to New Zealand and autopsied until after the Antarctic winter ended six months later; the cause of death was found to be methanol poisoning. Suicide was ruled out, as he seem to have no motive and had readily sought treatment for his apparent illness, nor did an accidental overdose seem likely because there was plenty of alcoholic drink available at the base. The New Zealand police believed instead that the methanol was "unknowingly" introduced into Marks' system but could not conclusively call the case a homicide. Further investigation has been frustrated by the refusal of US agencies to share their findings, the global dispersal of researchers and personnel at the base that winter, the 2006 disappearance of the doctor who treated Marks, and the loss of any possible crime scene evidence during the winter after Marks' death.
- Soad Hosny (58) was an actress from Cairo, Egypt, who died in London after she mysteriously fell from the balcony of her friend's apartment on 21 June 2001.
- On 11 August 2001, Irish musician Paul Cunniffe (40), formerly of the bands Blaze X and the Saw Doctors, died in a fall in the London neighborhood of Whitechapel. The circumstances that led to the fall, however, or even exactly where it occurred, remain unknown. His is one of several deaths among friends and acquaintances of Pete Doherty.
- Daniel Nolan (14) was an English schoolboy who disappeared from the Hampshire harbor town of Hamble-le-Rice after a fishing expedition on 1 January 2002. Sections of Nolan's body were discovered inside two socks in Swanage, Dorset, on 15 May 2003. His cause of death is undetermined.
- Abu Nidal (65), Palestinian terrorist leader behind the 1985 Rome and Vienna airport attacks, already suffering from leukemia, was reported to have died from a gunshot wound in Baghdad on 16 August 2002. Iraq's government at the time claimed his death was a suicide; however, the Fatah Revolutionary Council, which Nidal founded, claimed he was assassinated on Saddam Hussein's orders to prevent his possible capture during the US invasion of Iraq that began six months later.
- Jeremiah Duggan (22), a British student studying in Paris, was found dead on a highway in Wiesbaden, Germany, early on 27 March 2003. The initial investigation concluded he died by suicide by running into traffic. However, his mother, noting that he had called her in great distress over his involvement with the LaRouche movement, who may have discovered that he was British and Jewish, within an hour of his death, never accepted that theory, and a later investigation found evidence that the accident was perhaps staged to cover an earlier beating. The case was reopened in 2012 after extensive litigation in England, resulting in a change of the cause of death to "unexplained", with the note that Duggan may have been involved in some "altercation" beforehand.

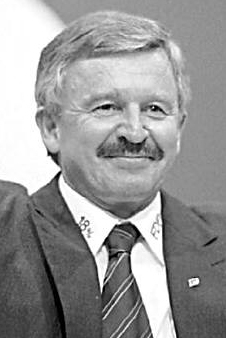
Jürgen Möllemann. Suspicion remains Möllemann may have died by suicide as opposed to his death being via misadventure

- Jürgen Möllemann (57), German Free Democratic Party politician, died on 5 June 2003 in a parachuting incident at Marl-Lohmühle. His death was investigated by the Essen district attorney's office, which published a final report on 9 July 2003. While outside interference was ruled out, no definite verdict was reached on whether he died by suicide or had died via misadventure. Shortly before his death, Möllemann, a passionate and experienced skydiver, was confronted with allegations of involvement in illegal arms deals and evaded taxes on millions of euros he allegedly earned from these activities. To enable a full investigation on these charges, the Bundestag lifted his parliamentary immunity on 5 June 2003 at 12:28, 22 minutes before his death. The tax evasion charges were dropped after his death.
- US singer-songwriter Elliott Smith (34) died of stab wounds inflicted in his Los Angeles home on 21 October 2003. His girlfriend, Jennifer Chiba, claims she got out of the shower after an argument—having heard him scream—to find him with a knife sticking out of his chest, and found a short suicide note on a Post-It shortly thereafter. Despite common belief, the note did not misspell Elliott's name by leaving out a 't'; it was instead the coroner who made the mistake on the report. While he did indeed have a history of depression and drug addiction, friends say he was actively working to finish an album at the time and seemed optimistic. The coroner found the stab wounds were inconsistent with a suicide attempt but could not conclude it was a homicide either; the cause of the stabbing remains undetermined and has not been further investigated.
- Jonathan Luna (38), an Assistant US Attorney from Baltimore, was found dead of multiple stab wounds inflicted with his own penknife in Denver, Pennsylvania, on the morning of 4 December 2003 in a stream underneath his car, which had been driven there overnight from Baltimore. The FBI, which has jurisdiction over the possible murder of US federal employees, found that Luna had mounting financial problems and was facing investigation over missing money at his office; they considered it a suicide or botched attempt at staging a kidnapping. However, the Lancaster County, Pennsylvania coroner's office, pointing to evidence suggesting he had been abducted and someone else was driving for at least the final stage of his drive, ruled it a homicide and considers the case open.
- Lamduan Armitage was a formerly unidentified woman whose body was discovered in 2004 on the mountain Pen-y-ghent in Yorkshire, England, leading her to be known as the Lady of the Hills. She was found to have originally come from southeast Asia, but despite an international police investigation, the identity of the woman and how she arrived at the location remained a mystery until 2019. The woman was identified in March 2019 through DNA testing. Her cause of death remains unknown.
- Alonzo Brooks (23), a US man who went missing from La Cygne, Kansas on 3 April 2004 and was found dead on 1 May 2004. After the pathologists did an autopsy they have not yet been able to tell the cause of his death.
- The coroner investigating the death of Richard Lancelyn Green (51), a British Arthur Conan Doyle scholar found garrotted with a shoelace on his bed in his home on 27 March 2004, returned an open verdict. Many friends and family suspected homicide as he had complained of someone following him in his efforts to stop the auction of a cache of Doyle's personal papers he believed were wrongfully acquired. However, despite suicide by garrotte being unusual and difficult, some investigators believed that he had followed the example of one of Doyle's Sherlock Holmes stories in which a woman stages her suicide to look like a murder.
- John Garang (60), Sudanese politician and former rebel revolutionary leader, died on 30 July 2005 in New Cush, Sudan in a suspicious helicopter crash.
- Barbara Precht's (69) body was found on 29 November 2006 in Cincinnati, Ohio. She remained unidentified until November 2014. Her husband was later located and is considered a person of interest in her death, which has unknown circumstances.
- British Joyce Carol Vincent (38) was found dead in her London flat in January 2006, two years after death; the body had decomposed so much as to make identifying a cause of death impossible; her story was profiled in the 2011 documentary Dreams of a Life.
- US writer Rey Rivera (32) was working for Stansberry and Associates and went missing from his house on 16 May 2006 and was found dead on Belvedere Hotel on 24 May 2006 in Mount Vernon neighborhood of Baltimore, Maryland. Even though the Baltimore Police Department has claimed that his death was most likely to be a suicide, this has not been proven to be the case.
- British Bob Woolmer (58), Pakistan's national cricket coach, was found dead in his hotel room on 18 March 2007, after losing in the Cricket World Cup 2007 in the West Indies. Investigators first ruled the death a suicide, but the jury that heard the inquest returned an open verdict.
- The body of Corryn Rayney (44) was found in the Perth suburb of Kings Park, Western Australia a week after her 7 August 2007 disappearance; her husband Lloyd was charged in her murder even though a cause of death had not been determined. A judge acquitted him at his 2012 trial, finding the largely circumstantial case was compromised by police misconduct. The verdict was upheld on appeal the following year; Rayney and his lawyers have called for two known sex criminals to be investigated.
- The Canadian Salish Sea human foot discoveries are the severed feet found from 20 August 2007 to present that are known to belong to people who are thought to be dead. The circumstances behind these events remain unclear.
- Tony Harris (36), US basketball player who had played in multiple countries, disappeared from Brasília, Brazil on 4 November 2007 and was found dead on 18 November 2007. There are different ideas about why he died, yet the true cause of his death is unknown.
- After Ophélie Bretnacher (22), a French exchange student, left a Budapest nightclub for her apartment early 2 December 2008, security cameras recorded her walking in that direction; it was the last time she was seen alive. Her handbag was found later on the Széchenyi Chain Bridge over the Danube, which she had been recorded crossing. Two months later, her body was found washed up on the river island of Csepel, within the city but upstream from the bridge. Hungarian authorities were unable to determine the cause of death and closed the case in 2014.
- US professional wrestler Steven James Bisson (32), who went by the ring name of "Steve Bradley", was found dead on 4 December 2008 in Manchester, New Hampshire, in a parking lot across the street from a pro wrestling school where he once operated. Bradley's cause of death is undetermined, as the autopsy could not reveal what he died from.
- The Peter Bergmann case is an unsolved mystery pertaining to the death of an unidentified man in County Sligo, Ireland, whose body was found on a beach; the autopsy found no signs of drowning or foul play and thus the cause of death remains undetermined. From 12 to 16 June 2009, a man using the alias "Peter Bergmann" visited the coastal seaport town of Sligo in northwest Ireland. He used this alias to check into the Sligo City Hotel, where he stayed during most of his visit. Hotel staff and tenants say he had a heavy German accent. Despite conducting a five-month investigation into the death of "Peter Bergmann", the Garda Síochána have never been able to identify the man or develop any leads in the case.
- Skeletal remains found in a dry creek bed in the Malibu Canyon in California on 9 August 2010 were those of Mitrice Richardson (25). She was last seen on the night of 16 September 2009 in the backyard of a former local television news anchor after being arrested for marijuana possession and failure to pay the bill at a local restaurant where she had been acting strangely. Behavior investigators did not believe her death was caused by alcohol or drugs. The coroner has said her death did not appear to be a homicide, but the body was too decayed to determine the exact cause of death.
- Irish Paul 'Frank' Byrne was last seen alive in Tallaght, Dublin on 15 July 2009 leaving with other men in a car. His remains were found the following year in the Wicklow mountains and his death is under investigation as of July 2025.
- The US Jamison family disappeared mysteriously on 8 October 2009 from Red Oak, Oklahoma and were all later found dead after four years in November 2013. Their death causes could not be determined.

=== 2010–2019 ===
- On 23 August 2010, the partially decomposed body of Gareth Williams (32), a Welsh mathematician who worked for British intelligence GCHQ, but who was seconded to MI6 at the time of his death, was found in a padlocked bag in the bathroom of a safe house in the London neighbourhood of Pimlico. It was determined he had been dead for about a week. Due to the nature of his work, the investigation had to withhold details of it and some other aspects from any material made public; his family and friends allege that the Metropolitan Police compromised and mishandled key forensic evidence in the early stages of their response. An initial investigation by the coroner's office concluded that the death was a homicide; a later re-investigation by the police claimed that it was instead an accident.
- Rajiv Dixit (43), an Indian public speaker and social activist, died on 30 November 2010 in Bhilai, Chhattisgarh, of a heart attack. It is claimed that Dixit refused to undergo emergency medical treatment, and died shortly thereafter. No autopsy was conducted.
- Anneka Di Lorenzo (58) was a US film star and a nude model who was found dead in January 2011 after drowning in the sea off Camp Pendleton. It is unknown whether or not her death was either a murder or suicide.
- British citizen Lee Bradley Brown (39) was arrested by Dubai police on holiday there 6 April 2011 and charged with assault after an incident with a hotel maid; accounts of the circumstances differ. Held without bail, he died in custody six days later after, police claimed, being beaten by cellmates; later they said he had "thrown himself on the ground repeatedly." An autopsy, however, found that Brown had choked on his own vomit under the influence of hashish. British officials allowed to examine the body disputed that conclusion, saying they saw no evidence of choking or blunt force trauma; Dubai authorities declined repeated requests to share evidence such as CCTV footage of the original incident and the police station. A coroner's inquest in the UK that considered only the autopsy report and the diplomats' reports returned an open verdict.
- Anjuman Shehzadi (33–34), Pakistani film and stage actress, was found dead in Lahore under mysterious circumstances on 15 May 2011. Her death remains unsolved.
- Maddy Scott (20) was a Canadian woman who disappeared on 28 May 2011 from Vanderhoof, British Columbia and was found dead on 27 May 2023. Her cause of death is unknown.
- Tom J. Anderson (35), formerly known by his birth name "Ahmad Rezaee", was a businessman and the eldest son of Iranian Major General Mohsen Rezaee. On 12 November 2011, he was found dead in the Gloria Hotel, located in Dubai Media City, where he was staying. There are different theories about how he died, yet the cause of his death remains unknown.
- Stephen Corrigan (48) was an Irish man who disappeared on 22 November 2011; on 9 April 2020 some remains of his skeleton were found in Rathmines, Dublin. Corrigan's death cause is unknown.
- Christoph Bulwin (40), German man who died of complications related to mercury poisoning on 9 May 2012. He may have been poisoned by someone whose identity is unknown.
- Arkadiusz Sojka (32), was a football (soccer) player striker from Poland who went missing in June 2012 from Przesieka, and was found dead in October 2012. His cause of death is not known.
- Candice Cohen-Ahnine (35), a French Jewish woman who successfully fought a legal battle against Saudi prince Sattam bin Khalid Al Saud over their illegitimate daughter, fell to her death in Paris on 16 August 2012. Her death is considered suspicious in nature due to the circumstances.
- On 14 February 2013, British businessman Harry Roy Veevers died in Kenya, but the reasons for his death remain unknown as his sons claim he was poisoned. The court could not make a clear judgement as the evidence were inconclusive.
- Exiled Russian oligarch Boris Berezovsky (67) was found dead in his home near Ascot, England on 23 March 2013. At first glance he had hanged himself; he had recently lost what remained of his fortune, and some close friends had unexpectedly died, which left him despondent. The police soon ruled the case a suicide, but at the inquest, Berezovsky's daughter, who believes her father was murdered at the behest of the Russian government, introduced a report by a German pathologist that cast enough doubt for the coroner to return an open verdict.
- Zsolt Erőss (45), a Hungarian high-altitude mountaineer, disappeared on 21 May 2013 while he was climbing Kangchenjunga. Erőss' body was found in 2014, and his death cause is unknown.
- The decomposing remains of Canadian journalist Dave Walker (57) were found in Cambodia's Angkor temple complex on 1 May 2014, ending a search that began shortly after he failed to return to his hotel's guest house on the night of 14 February that year. While the medical examiner concluded that he had died weeks earlier, the cause of Walker's death could not be determined.
- Bone fragments found along the Rio Culebra near Boquete, Panama, in late June 2014 were matched to Lisanne Froon, 22, and Kris Kremers, 21, of Amersfoort, the Netherlands. The two were last seen alive on 1 April when they went hiking on the popular El Pianista trail. After unsuccessful initial searches, a backpack belonging to the women was turned in by a local. It contained their phones, a Canon camera, and personal effects. After two months, a small fraction of their remains was found as well. Their cell phones showed that they repeatedly attempted to contact emergency numbers shortly after taking pictures of themselves at the Continental Divide. Those calls continued over several days, and Froon's camera contained 90 photographs taken in the night of 8 April, seven days after their disappearance. Most photos showed the jungle in the dark, but some contained rock formations, small pieces of paper and other items in close-up, and one contained the back of Kremers' head. It was impossible to determine from the remains exactly how they had died. Local officials believe the women suffered an accidental injury shortly after getting lost in a network of trails in the region's cloud forests and got lost in the wilderness around Volcán Barú; however, Panamanian lawyers for their families have pointed to failings of the investigation and suggested both women could have met with foul play.
- On 27 June 2014, the body of Andrew Sadek (20) was recovered from the Red River near Breckenridge, Minnesota, with a small-caliber gunshot wound and a backpack full of rocks. He was last seen by a security camera leaving his dorm at North Dakota State College of Science in Wahpeton, North Dakota around 2:00 on 1 May. At the time, he had been working as a confidential informant for local police after being arrested for selling marijuana on campus, which could otherwise have resulted in a long prison sentence. It has not been determined yet whether his death was suicide or murder. Like Rachel Hoffman's death, the case has been used as an example of the mishandling of youthful CIs by police.
- Gennadiy Tsypkalov (43) was a political and military figure of the unrecognized Luhansk People's Republic (LPR). According to officials of the Luhansk People's Republic, Tsypkalov died by suicide on 17 May 2014, yet according to some of Tsypkalov's colleagues whom Igor Plotnitsky dismissed, the leadership of LPR murdered Tsypkalov. His true death cause is unknown.
- Lennon Lacy, a US student at West Bladen High School in Bladenboro, North Carolina, was found dead in the center of a mobile home community hanging from the frame of a swing set. on 29 August 2014. It is unclear whether he died by suicide or murder.
- John Sheridan (72), formerly New Jersey's Transportation Commissioner, was found dead in his Skillman, New Jersey home along with his wife Joyce on the morning of 28 September 2014. The bodies were in an upstairs bedroom where a fire had been set; they were found with multiple stab wounds. An original ruling of murder-suicide was changed to undetermined in 2017 after a court challenge by the couple's sons, motivated by complaints of mishandled evidence and some evidence suggesting the couple had been attacked by an intruder. The sons called for the investigation to be reopened, which the state attorney general did in 2022.
- The Unnao dead bodies row, discovered on 14 January 2015, were the remains of over 100 unidentified bodies found floating in the River Ganges in Unnao district located in the Indian state of Uttar Pradesh. The cause of their deaths is unknown.
- Alberto Nisman (51), an Argentine federal prosecutor, was found dead in his apartment with a gunshot wound to the head on 18 January 2015. He had been investigating the 1994 AMIA bombing, Argentina's deadliest terror attack, and publicly accused President Cristina Kirchner and other high officials of covering up for suspects in the case for foreign-policy reasons; he was scheduled to present these allegations to Congress the next day. While some circumstances of his death are consistent with an early statement that he died by suicide, friends and relatives say he was eagerly looking ahead to his appearance before Congress and did not seem depressed or despondent. Kirchner has suggested the country's intelligence services were behind the killing since he was about to expose their attempts to bring her down and called for them to be dismantled. The case remains under investigation.
- Kayla Mueller (26), a US human rights activist and humanitarian aid worker who was taken captive by the Islamic State in August 2013 in Aleppo, Syria, where she was helping Doctors Without Borders, was reported to have died in a Jordanian air strike during the Syrian Civil War in Raqqa on 6 February 2015. Her death was confirmed by the Pentagon, but the circumstances could not be established by the US. The Pentagon confirmed that the building ISIS claims she died in was hit during the bombings but disputed that Mueller or any other civilian was inside at the time. The site had been bombed by the coalition twice before and was targeted again because ISIS soldiers sometimes return to bombed sites, thinking the coalition would not bomb those sites again, according to Pentagon spokesman John Kirby. After Abu Bakr al-Baghdadi's death in October 2019, new speculations arose that Al-Baghdadi may have had her executed.
- Josh Greenberg (29), co-founder of the music-streaming service Grooveshark, which had shut down a few months earlier after settling several copyright-infringement suits brought by major music companies, was found dead in his bed by his girlfriend on 29 July 2015 at their apartment in Gainesville, Florida. The autopsy could not establish a cause of death; investigators said that suicide or foul play are unlikely.
- Vladimir Cvijan, Serbian lawyer and politician, former MP (2012–2014) and legal advisor and General Secretary of President of Serbia (2004–2010). High-ranked member of ruling SNS of Aleksandar Vučić, from 2010 to 2014, and later dissident disappeared in 2017, allegedly fleeing to the United States. However, in March 2021, Serbian media published a document in which the Public Prosecutor of the Higher Public Prosecutors Office in Belgrade stated that the Prosecutor's Office had issued an order ordering the payment of costs to the Institute for Forensic Medicine of the Faculty of Medicine, University of Belgrade for the autopsy of Vladimir Cvijan's body on 20 November 2018 in Belgrade, Serbia. The cause, circumstances and exact date of his death are still unknown.

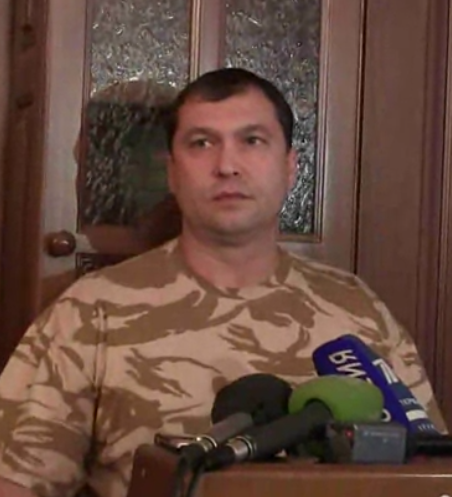
Valery Bolotov. Leader of the Luhansk People's Republic. His body was discovered on 27 January 2017

- Valery Bolotov (46) was a Ukrainian militant leader known for his involvement in the War in Donbas in eastern Ukraine, and as the leader of the unrecognized Luhansk People's Republic. Bolotov was found dead on 27 January 2017 in his own home in Moscow, Russia. The preliminary results of clinical tests showed an acute heart failure as reason for death. Poisoning later was suspected. The causes of his death are being investigated and are not currently known.
- Otto Warmbier (22) was a US college student who was arrested and detained in North Korea since January 2016, on charges that he had attempted to steal a propaganda poster. During his imprisonment, he suffered an unspecified injury which caused him to go into a coma, from which he died on 19 June 2017.
- Sean Suiter (43) was a US homicide detective working in Baltimore City who died on 16 November 2017 of a gunshot to the head. It is not known whether it was self-inflicted or not.
- Rogelio Martinez (36), an agent of the United States Border Patrol, died on 19 November 2017 in Culberson County, Texas while on duty. His cause of death is thought to be murder, but this remains uncertain owing to a lack of evidence. A four-month investigation was conducted by the FBI into his death cause, but the results were inconclusive.
- Sridevi (54) was an Indian actress who died on 24 February 2018 after she was found drowning in her bathtub by her husband in the Emirates Hotel of Dubai. Her mysterious accidental death in a foreign country remains unsolved and has led to a number of conspiracy theories.
- US computer hacker Adrian Lamo (37) was found dead 14 March 2018 on a pile of sheets in the guest bedroom of the Wichita, Kansas, home of a couple he was living with. After three months of investigating, the county coroner was unable to identify a cause of death. While some alternative theories suggest his death was related to his controversial involvement in the criminal cases against Chelsea Manning and Julian Assange, the most likely theory is a possible adverse interactions between medication found near him and kratom, which he often used.
- Fernando Albán (56), a Venezuelan-Colombian politician, lawyer, and activist, who died on 8 October 2018, while being held in the headquarters of the Bolivarian Intelligence Service (SEBIN) in Plaza Venezuela, Caracas. His cause of death is unknown.
- Hong Kong teenager Chan Yin-lam, who participated in the 2019 Hong Kong protests, was found dead and naked in the harbour off Tseung Kwan O on 22 September 2019. This sparked conspiracy theories in pro-protest circles, notably the online platform LIHKG that Chan had been killed by the police. On 11 September 2020, a coroner's inquest jury ruled that the cause of death could not be determined.
- Yolanda Klug (26), German woman whose disappearance in Leipzig on 25 September 2019 has been linked to Scientology. A walker discovered her bones on 25 February 2023 in the "Rödel" forest area near Freyburg. The cause of death is unclear.
- Marc Bennett (52), a British citizen working for Qatar Airways, was found hanged in his Doha hotel room on 24 December 2019. Authorities there ruled it suicide, a finding Bennett's friend and family disputed as he was actively making plans for his future at a new job with a Saudi company. The airline might have been upset by this since Qatar and Saudi Arabia did not have good relations at the time; a couple of months earlier, after he had let them know that he was dissatisfied and leaving, he was arrested and charged with possessing stolen documents from the company. During the month he was held, he said he was tortured. The West Sussex Coroner's Office reinvestigated the death and found that foul play "could not be ruled out".

=== 2020s ===
- Ana Lucrecia Taglioretti (24) was a blind female Paraguayan violinist and prodigy who had performed at events for charitable causes. She was found dead on 9 January 2020 in her apartment in Asunción, Paraguay, by her mother during a welfare check. Her cause of death is unknown.
- Facundo Astudillo Castro (22–23) was an Argentine man who disappeared on 30 April 2020 during the COVID-19 pandemic after being stopped by police in Mayor Buratovich, Buenos Aires. Castro was found dead on 15 August 2020. Though Castro's death was revealed to be caused by drowning, it could not be determined if it was a result of homicide, suicide, or an accident.
- Esther Dingley (37) was an English hiker and blogger who disappeared on a solo trip through the Pyrenees. Partial remains were found in July 2021 and were later confirmed to be Dingley's following a DNA examination. Her cause of death is currently unknown.
- John Snorri Sigurjónsson (48), Juan Pablo Mohr Prieto (37), and Ali Sadpara (45), three high-altitude mountaineers, went missing while climbing the Bottleneck area of Pakistan's K2 mountain on 5 February 2021. The three men's bodies were found on 26 July of that year, but cause of death could not be determined.
- Melissa Caddick (49) was an Australian financial advisor who vanished on 12 November 2020 amid allegations that she was running a Ponzi scheme. Her partial remains were found floating in the ocean in February 2021 but cause of death is yet to be established.
- James Dean (35) was an English footballer and champion kickboxer who disappeared in the area of Oswaldtwistle on 5 May 2021. His body was found four days later. While authorities have said that the case is not treated as a homicide, no cause of death has been determined. The police announced his death was not being treated as suspicious.
- Aguil Chut-Deng (55), also known as "Aguil Chut-Deng Acouth" and "Aguil de'Chut Deng", was a South Sudanese activist and revolutionary who was found dead on 26 April 2022 in a wooded area in Brisbane after being reported missing a day earlier. Her cause of death is not yet known.
- Dan Rapoport (52), Latvian-born US businessman, fell to his death from a building in Washington, D.C., on 14 August 2022. The cause of the fall has not been officially determined. Speculation has considered the possibilities of both suicide or homicide by either aggrieved business connections or the Russian government, of whom Rapoport had become increasingly critical.
- Julian Sands (65), English actor who went missing in January 2023 in the San Gabriel Mountains northeast of Los Angeles, while hiking. Sands' remains were found in June, but due to the condition of the body his cause of death could not be established.
- Émile Soleil (2), disappeared on 8 July 2023 in the French commune of Le Vernet, Alpes-de-Haute-Provence. No trace of him was found until March 2024, when his skull was found by a hiker. His cause of death could not be determined.
- Elinés Olivero (22), Venezuelan female military officer who died in Tumeremo, Venezuela on 1 October 2023, either by suicide or was murdered.
- Ross McDonnell (44) was an Irish photographer, cinematographer, and film director who went missing in New York City on 4 November 2023 and whose partial remains were found on 17 November 2023. His cause of death is unknown, but local authorities believe his body was dismembered by sharp rocks.
- Humaira Asghar (41), Pakistani actress and model, disappeared since 7 October 2024 initially thought to have cut off from media industry and social media. She was found dead (severely decomposed) on 8 July 2025 in her Karachi apartment, during a court-ordered eviction due to months of unpaid rent. A foul odour from the flat led police and a bailiff to forcibly enter the locked apartment, where they discovered her decomposed body. Investigators at Jinnah Postgraduate Medical Centre concluded that she most likely died on 7 October 2024. Due to the advanced state of decomposition, her cause of death could not be determined.

== Date of death disputed ==
- Johann Georg Faust, German alchemist and astrologer, was reportedly killed in an explosion in either 1540 or 1541. It was assumed that Faust had been killed in an alchemical accident. However, the nature of this accident is unknown and Faust's body was said to have been "grievously mutilated", leading to suggestions of foul play and even of Satanic involvement.
- Raoul Wallenberg (b. 1912), a Swedish diplomat who worked in Budapest, Hungary, was most likely executed in the Soviet Union in or around 1947 after being captured by the Red Army in 1945. His death is dated by Soviet authorities as 16 July 1947, but this is disputed, and the case remains unsolved.
- Hans Kammler (b. 1901), a Nazi engineer and SS commander, whose last confirmed appearances were in 1945. In 1948, he was retroactively declared by the court to have died by suicide on 9 May 1945, based on several claimed eyewitnesses; however, doubts remain about the timing and circumstances of Kammler's death.

== Official cause of death disputed ==
Cases where there are unofficial alternative theories about the death of a person – the most common theory being that the death was a homicide – can be found under Death conspiracy theories.

== See also ==
- Cold case (criminology)
- Forensic science
- List of kidnappings
- List of unsolved historical mysteries and proposed explanations
- List of unsolved murders in the United Kingdom
- Lists of people by cause of death
- Lists of people who disappeared
- Lists of unsolved murders
- Unidentified decedent
