= Unnao dead bodies row =

Dead bodies found floating in the River Ganges

- Date: 14 January 2015
- Location: River Ganges, Unnao district, Uttar Pradesh; 26°37′05″N 80°17′03″E
- Cause: Unknown
- Deaths: 110

On 14 January 2015, more than one hundred unidentified dead bodies were found floating in the River Ganges in Unnao district in the Indian state of Uttar Pradesh. The dead bodies are believed to be of mostly unmarried girls and children. They were later buried at the riverbank.

== Incident ==
The bodies, which were mostly of children and unmarried girls, were first noticed on 14 January 2015 by some villagers at Ganga Ghat Shuklaganj balu ghat in Unnao district when crows and dogs were feeding on them. The area was cordoned off by officials and 104 dead bodies were retrieved from the river. Samples were taken for forensic DNA profiling, as, according to officials, postmortem was not possible. Without going for cremation the dead bodies were buried at the riverbank. On the same day, six more dead bodies were found floating in the river and retrieved from the neighbouring district of Jhansi.

One of the explanations given by the officials was that since the river had changed its course due to the construction of a new barrage, the water level became lower and the bodies surfaced. A magisterial enquiry was ordered by the then Chief Minister of Uttar Pradesh Akhilesh Yadav to uncover the facts of the incident. The chairperson of Bahujan Samaj Party, Mayawati, demanded CBI enquiry into the incident and said that it "has infused fear among people". Azam Khan, a cabinet minister in Uttar Pradesh government, accused political rival Sakshi Maharaj of being responsible for the incident;

I have come to know that Sakshi Maharaj brought a truck loaded with bodies to the spot and unloaded it into the river to defame the state government.

== Location ==
The dead bodies were found floating in a canal at Ganga Ghat Shuklaganj balu ghat, which connects to the Ganges and is 60 km southwest from Lucknow, the state capital of Uttar Pradesh and 30 km northeast from Kanpur.

== River ==
The Ganges River is regarded as a holy river by Hindus and many crematory ghats are on its banks. Police officials of Unnao have offered an explanation that the bodies were of "people who were dumped in the river or buried on the banks after their families could not afford a proper cremation."

== See also ==
- List of unsolved deaths
