= Death of Lennon Lacy =

American student who died in 2014

Lennon Lacy was a student attending West Bladen High School, in Bladenboro, North Carolina. On August 29, 2014, at age 17, he was found dead, hanging from the frame of a swing set in the center of a mobile home community. The death was initially declared a suicide by North Carolina's Chief Medical Examiner, but Lacy's family believed that he had been lynched. Lacy, who was black, had been dating a white woman, who also believed Lacy had been murdered, and who claimed neighbors had warned her that their interracial relationship was "not right". In December 2014, the Federal Bureau of Investigation (FBI) announced it would investigate. In June 2016, the conclusion of the FBI investigation was announced, having found "no evidence to pursue federal criminal civil rights charges".

== Documentary ==
The death of Lacy is the central event in a documentary on lynching in America, Always in Season, shown at the Sundance Film Festival in January, 2019, where it won the special jury award for moral urgency. Ed Pilkington wrote in The Guardian that the film "is both a homage to Lennon Lacy and a critique of America’s rotten racial core, weaving the two together through an exploration of blurred memory, denial, obfuscation, betrayal and loss."

== See also ==
- List of unsolved deaths
