= Death of Daniel Nolan =

Unsolved 2002 missing person case

Daniel Nolan
- Born: Daniel James Nolan; 5 February 1987
- Disappeared: 1 January 2002 (aged 14); Hamble-le-Rice, Hampshire, England
- Status: Confirmed dead
- Height: 5 ft 7 in (170 cm)

Daniel James Nolan (5 February 1987 – 1 January 2002) was a 14 year-old English boy who vanished around midnight on New Year's Day, 2002, from the Hampshire harbour town of Hamble-le-Rice after a fishing expedition with a group of friends.

== Background ==
Daniel (called "Dan" by friends and family) was born 5 February 1987, and was the eldest of five children. He was an avid fisher, growing up by the seaside, and was very experienced.

== Disappearance ==
On the evening of New Year's Day, 2002, Daniel went fishing with a group of friends. He had told his parents that he would be back around 2am. He was last seen outside the Victory Pub in the village, where he left the group to go back to pontoon to collect his fishing gear. His parents then reported him missing after he failed to arrive back home after 2am. Police arrived shortly after at the pontoon where Daniel was heading, and divers searched the waters looking for any clues surrounding Daniel's whereabouts, although failing light and a high tide made further searching difficult. The search was unsuccessful, and no trace of Daniel was found.

== Aftermath ==
On 15 May 2003, human remains of feet encased in two socks were found in Chapman's Pool, a remote area in Swanage, Dorset, miles away from where he went missing. DNA evidence later positively identified it as Daniel's, and he was confirmed dead.

=== Play ===
The story was later adapted into a play by award-winning playwright Mark Wheeller, who was inspired to write the play after seeing posters of Daniel outside his local Tesco. ‘Dan Nolan: Missing’ was initially published in 2003 while the case was still open. After the remains were found on 15th May 2003, the play was adapted and the name was changed to ‘Missing Dan Nolan’.

== See also ==
- List of solved missing person cases: post–2000
- List of unsolved deaths
