= Lipót Klug =

Hungarian mathematician

Lipót (or Leopold) Klug
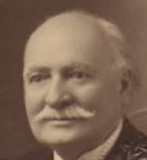
- Born: 23 January 1854; Gyöngyös, Hungary
- Died: 24 March 1945 (aged 91); Budapest, Hungary
- Resting place: Kozma Street Cemetery; 47°28′22″N 19°10′46″E
- Education: University of Budapest
- Parent(s): Miksa Klug and Hani Neufeld
- Scientific career
- Fields: Mathematics
- Workplaces: Franz Joseph University

Lipót, or Leopold (in German), Klug (23 January 1854 – 24 March 1945) was a Jewish-Hungarian mathematician, professor in the Franz Joseph University of Kolozsvár.

== Life and work ==
Klug attended the gymnasium of his hometown and entered Eötvös Loránd University in 1872 where he graduated as docent in 1874. Between 1874 and 1893 he taught mathematics in the high school of Pozsony (now Bratislava in Slovakia). From 1893 to 1897 he was professor in a secondary school in Budapest and he obtained his habilitation in the university of Budapest. In 1897 he was appointed professor of geometry in the University of Kolozsvár. He retired in 1917 and moved back to Budapest.

He died in 1944 or 1945 in strange circumstances: in the middle of World War II and aged 91 years, he walked out of his home in Budapest and he never came back. Likely a victim of racial hate because he was of Jewish descent.

His work was greatly influenced by Gyula Kőnig. His areas of research were descriptive geometry and synthetic geometry. During his retirement in Budapest he encouraged the young Edward Teller (the father of the hydrogen bomb).

== See also ==
- List of unsolved deaths

== Bibliography ==
- Kántor-Varga, T. (2006). "Biographies". In János Horváth (ed.). A Panorama of Hungarian Mathematics in the Twentieth Century. Springer. pp. 563–608. ISBN 3-540-28945-3.
- Oláh-Gál, Róbert (2009). "The Most Cited Hungarian Geometer of the Geometric Institution of the Technical University of Wien". Visual Mathematics: 1–6. ISSN 1821-1437.
- Szenkovits, Ferenc (2014). "Remarkable Hungarian mathematicians at the Cluj University". Studia Universitatis Babeş-Bolyai, Mathematica. 59 (4): 419–433. ISSN 2065-961X.
