= Harry Roy Veevers =

British businessman who died under suspicious circumstances

- Born: January , 1949; Rochdale, Greater Manchester, United Kingdom
- Died: February 14, 2013 (aged 64); Mombasa, Kenya
- Cause of death: Possible poisoning with pesticide
- Occupation: Businessman
- Known for: Dispute arising from his death
- Children: 5

Harry Roy Veevers (January 1949–14 February 2013) was a British man who lived in Kenya. He was born in Bacup, Greater Manchester.

Harry Roy Veevers was a Joiner and Builder. He was a Director of Rochdale Developments Ltd. Caramc Ltd and owner of Veevers Building and Joinery.

In 2001, he liquidated his British assets and bought 3 properties in Nyali, Mombasa, Kenya.

His death in 2013 started a long dispute lasting over a decade, due to claims that he was fatally poisoned. This led to a lengthy legal investigation.

== Early life and career ==
Born 17 January 1949 and originally from Bacup, Greater Manchester, United Kingdom, Veevers was involved in real estate in Rochdale and Greater Manchester.

== Death ==
Veevers died unexpectedly on 14 February 2013 at the age of 64 in Mombasa. At first it was claimed that he had died of heart attack and a stroke, as he was buried the next day according to Islamic rites, when in fact he was a Christian. The hasty burial caused tension within his family as his sons.

This led to allegations that he was poisoned.

=== Allegations of poisoning ===
Due to concerns surrounding the death and burial, Veevers' two sons addressed the court with a petition to exhume their fathers' body. An autopsy was then performed in both Kenya and the United Kingdom, with unclear results. Several reports showed traces of the toxic pesticide cyhalothrin, while others showed no evidence at all.

=== Investigation ===
The investigation of Veevers' death that began in 2013 went on for 11 years, during which 16 witnesses testified. Among them were British and Kenyan forensic experts. In 2024, a Mombasa magistrate ruled that the cause of death could not be determined. The court cited advanced decomposition of the body, contradictions in forensic findings, and lapses in the chain of custody of evidence.

=== Subsequent events ===
Despite the 2024 magistrate court ruling, by 2025 Veevers' body was still in the mortuary of the Coast General Teaching and Referral Hospital, as no last will and testament was ever found stating Veevers' burial wishes. There continued to be a dispute where he should be buried, in the UK as his sons wanted, or in Kenya as his wife and daughters wanted. Another issue in the dispute was his inheritance which was still pending in another court.

== See also ==
- List of unsolved deaths
