= David Park Barnitz =

American poet (1878–1901)

- Born: June 24, 1878; Wheeling, West Virginia, U.S.
- Died: October 10, 1901 (aged 23); Des Moines, Iowa, U.S.
- Occupation: Poet
- Known for: The Book of Jade

David Park Barnitz (June 24, 1878 – October 10, 1901) was an American poet best known for The Book of Jade, a book of Decadent poetry published anonymously in 1901.

== Life and work ==
The Book of Jade was the only volume Barnitz published before his death at age 23. According to Publishers Weekly, the book has remained "renowned among horror readers for the 'ornate morbidity' of its contents". In 2015, Hippocampus Press published an expanded edition of The Book of Jade, edited by David E. Schultz and Michael J. Abolafia, which included previously unpublished writings.

In 1901, Midwest newspapers reported his death as accidental due to an enlarged heart. There was speculation among the public that Barnitz had committed suicide. H. P. Lovecraft referred to Park Barnitz as "a vivid Decadent of the fin de siècle period who modelled his verse on Baudelaire & killed himself soon after graduation from Harvard".

== See also ==
- List of unsolved deaths
