= Death of Davina Buff Jones =

1999 death of a North Carolina police officer

Davina Buff Jones
- Born: 1965 or 1966
- Died: October 22, 1999; Bald Head Island, North Carolina, U.S.
- Cause of death: Gunshot wound to the head (manner of death undetermined)
- Occupation: Police officer
- Employer: Bald Head Island Police Department

Davina Buff Jones was an American police officer with the Bald Head Island department. On October 22, 1999, she died from a gunshot wound to the back of her head while on duty near the Bald Head Island Lighthouse, commonly known as Old Baldy. She was 33 years old.

Jones's death was initially ruled a suicide by Brunswick County District Attorney Rex Gore in December 1999. A later North Carolina Industrial Commission proceeding found that she had been killed in the line of duty for purposes of death-benefit eligibility. In 2013, Brunswick County District Attorney Jon David changed the office's classification of the death from suicide to undetermined, stating that the evidence supported conflicting theories and that no definitive conclusion could be reached.

== Career ==
Jones became a full-time Bald Head Island police officer in January 1999. Contemporary reporting described her as a relatively new officer on the department at the time of her death.

== Death ==
On the night of October 22, 1999, Jones was on patrol and was reportedly investigating a stolen golf cart near Old Baldy Lighthouse. A recording of radio traffic reviewed by ABC11 indicated that Jones reported encountering three people. In subsequent transmissions, she was heard ordering someone to put down a gun before the transmission ended.

Other officers went to the lighthouse area and found Jones dead. She had sustained a single gunshot wound to the back of her head. Her patrol vehicle was nearby with its door open and headlights on. Reporting at the time stated that investigators concluded she had been shot with her own firearm.

== Initial investigation ==
Former Brunswick County District Attorney Rex Gore ruled Jones's death a suicide on December 9, 1999. Jones's family disputed that conclusion and sought death benefits through proceedings before the North Carolina Industrial Commission.

The Industrial Commission's Full Commission issued an Opinion and Award in 2005. The proceeding concerned eligibility for death benefits under North Carolina law, rather than criminal responsibility for Jones's death. The Commission found that it could not conclude Jones had died by suicide and found that she had been killed in the line of duty while performing her official duties.

== Reexamination and undetermined classification ==
In 2011, newly elected Brunswick County District Attorney Jon David announced that his office would reexamine Jones's death. The review included examination of prior investigative materials, additional witness interviews, visits to Bald Head Island, and reenactments of possible death-scene scenarios.

David also arranged an outside review by retired Federal Bureau of Investigation agents. According to the district attorney's announcement, the reviewers did not reach a consensus regarding the cause of death. On December 17, 2013, David changed the District Attorney's Office classification from suicide to undetermined. He stated that the available evidence supported two competing possibilities: homicide or a self-inflicted gunshot wound.

== Media coverage ==
Jones's death and the subsequent dispute over its classification have received coverage from local television stations and in a long-form feature by Adam Rhew for Charlotte Magazine.

== See also ==
- List of unsolved deaths
