= Elinés Olivero =

Venezuelan military officer (died 2023)

- Born: Elinés María Olivero Turmero c. 2001
- Died: 1 October 2023 (aged 21–22) Tumeremo, Venezuela
- Allegiance: Venezuela
- Branch: Venezuelan Army
- Rank: Lieutenant
- Education: Military Academy of Venezuela

Elinés María Olivero Turmero (c. 2001 – 1 October 2023) was a Venezuelan military officer. Olivero died on 1 October 2023. Although her official cause of death was ruled as a suicide, her mother said that her body was beaten, casting doubt on the theory.

== Career ==
Olivero was from Anaco, Anzoátegui state. She graduated from the Military Academy of Venezuela as an officer of the class of 2022 "Bicentenary of the Battle of Bombona and Pichincha". She was stationed at the Tomás de Heres Jungle Infantry Battalion, Tumeremo, Bolívar state, for at least a year.

== Death ==
A sergeant notified Olivero's family on 1 October 2023 about Olivero's death. According to the Armed Forces report, the death was ruled as a suicide, and Elinés was found dressed in a sports uniform and hanging from a sheet in the bathroom shower of her room at the barracks. On 4 October, a group of family friends from the 1st of May sector demonstrated in front of the Anaco City Hall to reject the version of the death of the Armed Forces and to request a new autopsy.

Olivero's relatives stated that the lieutenant had said she had problems with soldiers from the Tumeremo battalion. An audio of her mother that went viral on social networks described that the body had been beaten, ruling out suicide as the cause of death. The Public Prosecutor's Office announced that a second autopsy would be performed. Before the autopsy was concluded, pro-government media insisted that the death consisted of suicide. In the case of Últimas Noticias, the outlet later removed the information. The lieutenant's father said that by 6 October, when they were still waiting for the results of the autopsy, several pro-government media had already published the alleged results.

By the end of the month, the military high command had not mentioned the death and the Venezuelan Army had not even published a note of condolence. Journalist Sebastiana Barráez, who specializes in the military, stated that the indifference of the Armed Forces about the death cast doubt on the cause of death.

== See also ==
- List of unsolved deaths
