= Death of Don Kemp =

1982 American death in Wyoming

Don Kemp
- Born: Paul Donald Kemp Jr. April 21, 1947
- Disappeared: November 16, 1982 (aged 35); Wyoming, U.S.
- Died: c. November 16, 1982; Remains found in 1985 a short distance from where his car was found abandoned three years previously

Paul Donald Kemp Jr. (April 21, 1947 – ca. November 16, 1982) was an American advertising executive from New York City who disappeared under mysterious circumstances in a remote part of Wyoming in November 1982. He remained missing until his remains were discovered in 1985, a short distance from where his car was found abandoned three years previously.

== Background ==
Don Kemp was working in advertising on New York City's Madison Avenue when a traffic accident left him with debilitating injuries that took him several years to recover from. He decided to leave New York and embark on a fresh start in a mountain cabin in the Jackson Hole valley in Wyoming.

== Last known movements ==
Kemp left New York in September 1982 and drove to Wyoming in his Chevrolet Blazer. On November 15, the day before he disappeared, he visited a museum in Cheyenne, where he stayed for around two hours and did not speak to anyone. Upon leaving the museum, he left behind his briefcase, which contained his diaries, address book, traveler's checks and glasses needed for driving.

== Vehicle discovered ==
On the morning of November 16, 1982, Kemp's car was found abandoned with its engine still running, on a ramp off I-80, 40 mi (64 km) from the nearest town. The car was so full of belongings that there would have been no space for anyone except the driver. A single pair of footprints in the snow led investigators six miles (9.7 km) through the wilderness to a barn, where they found a pile of sticks arranged to start a fire and three of Kemp's socks. There were no footprints leading away from the barn, but Kemp was nowhere to be found. Nearby, investigators found a duffel bag containing laundry soap, clothes and a teapot, all of which belonged to Kemp.

Due to the solitary set of footprints, the lack of space for anyone else in the car and the featureless terrain which should have enabled searchers to easily spot a human being, investigators believed from the outset that Kemp had either disappeared of his own volition and did not want to be found, or was mentally unstable. Deputy Rod Johnson stated: "I felt the guy was disorientated, and I felt that he didn't want to be found. If he would've wanted to be found, he would have heard the aircraft, could have waved his arms, got [sic] our attention, gone up to a ridge, anywhere, and been sighted."

Three days after Kemp's disappearance, the search was called off due to a blizzard. Everyone involved in the search agreed that if Kemp was in the area and not already dead, he would have perished in the harsh weather.

== Mysterious phone calls ==
Several months after Kemp disappeared, Judy Aiello, a close friend of his from New York, returned home from an extended vacation to find six messages on her answering machine featuring a voice that she was certain was Kemp's, although the caller never stated his name. The caller sounded panicked and read out a number, urging Aiello to call him back. She did so the next day: a man answered and Aiello asked if Don was there. The man replied, "Yes," then almost immediately said, "No". Aiello asked the man if he could ask Don to call her back; the man replied, "Yeah" and hung up. Aiello never received a call back.

Aiello informed Kemp's mother, Mary, who in turn informed the authorities. They traced the calls to a rented trailer in Casper, Wyoming, occupied by a man named Mark Dennis. Dennis denied making the calls and ever having met Kemp. He suggested that either someone else used his telephone without his knowledge, or the telephone company made a mistake about the number used to call Aiello. He agreed to a polygraph test; authorities described him as cooperative and were satisfied that he was not involved in Kemp's disappearance.

Mary disagreed with the police's opinion on Dennis and traveled to Wyoming to question him herself. Dennis refused to speak to her and hired an attorney, before abruptly moving away from Casper three weeks after he was initially questioned by the police.

== Remains discovered ==
Kemp's decomposed remains were discovered in October 1985 by hunters a few miles from where his car was found. The autopsy showed no signs of foul play, and the authorities are satisfied that he walked into the wilderness voluntarily and died either in the blizzard or in the immediate aftermath. However, it remains a mystery as to how his body was not found during the initial search, as it was located in a clearly visible place that had already been searched.

== Sightings and other theories ==
Mary never accepted the findings and claimed up until her death in 2014 that Kemp was murdered by Mark Dennis. The source of the telephone calls remain a mystery, as Aiello's number was unlisted. Theories on online forums have surmised that someone found Kemp's address book that he had left at the museum in Cheyenne and phoned Aiello as a prank, while others have suggested that Kemp may have been abducted upon leaving the museum, explaining why Aiello was convinced that it was Kemp's voice on the voicemail messages.

In addition, two separate sightings of Kemp were reported in Casper in the months following the believed time of his death. One sighting was at an Abraham Lincoln exhibition and the other was at a bar.

== Media coverage ==
Kemp's case was covered in the premiere episode of the long-running investigative show Unsolved Mysteries on 20 January 1987.

== See also ==
- List of solved missing person cases
- List of unsolved deaths
