= Death of Jay Ferdinand Towner =

Jay Ferdinand Towner III (1910 – November 11, 1933) was a youth from Perryman, Maryland who was found dead on the campus of Princeton University shortly after a Princeton versus Dartmouth football game, in 1933. The mystery of Towner's death was taken up by United States Senator Millard Tydings.

== Death circumstances ==
Towner was discovered a few hours after the game with both of his wrists fractured and internal injuries. However, there was no indication that he had been the victim of foul play or hit by a car. Authorities thought perhaps he had been crushed against the wall of Palmer Stadium, while the crowd was exiting from the game. He later died from his injuries as he walked across the Princeton campus. Other information contended that Towner was in one of Princeton's dormitories following the football game. Another source said that he was seen in an automobile parking area.

Three Princeton students reported seeing Towner in the undergraduate cheering section during the game. Princeton police were told on November 13 that Towner was seen falling down the concrete steps of the stadium during the football contest. This occurred during the most exciting part of the game when Princeton scored the only touchdown. Towner rose from his seat, tripped and fell down five concrete steps, landing on his hands. He was assisted to his seat by other spectators, appearing to be uninjured. Editors of the Daily Princetonian established that Towner was not pinned and crushed against a concrete wall by the departing crowd.

== Investigation ==
Tydings received the cooperation of New Jersey Governor A. Harry Moore on November 20, 1933. Moore requested a report from prosecutor Erwin E. Marshall and Mercer County, New Jersey chief of detectives, James Kirkham.

Towner's death was the second unexplained and violent demise on the Princeton campus within a month's time. On October 9, 1933, John Tighe, a janitor, was discovered dead between two Princeton buildings. His skull was fractured and he had fractures of one arm and several ribs, as well as internal injuries. It was surmised that Tighe had fallen from a building or been hit by a car. However, there was no evidence to support either hypothesis.

== See also ==
- List of unsolved deaths
