= Anjuman Shehzadi =

Pakistani dancer and actress

- Born: Uzma Yasmeen; 1977 or 1978
- Died: May 15, 2011 (aged 32–33); Lahore, Pakistan
- Years active: 2000–2011

Anjuman Shehzadi (1977 – 15 May 2011) was a Pakistani stage and film actress. She was known for her bold dances.

== Biography ==
She was born as Uzma Yasmeen in c. 1977 or 1978.

She started her artistic career in 2000. She worked in more than one hundred stage plays. Her popularity was accounted more for her bold dances than her acting; for which, she was criticized more than her peer actresses. She was cast by renowned producers of the country that led to her rising fame. She appeared in Lollywood films as an item girl and supporting actress.

In 2009, Shahzadi was arrested by Lahore Police on a charge of unethical dance performance. Later, the court granted her bail application and ordered Shahzadi's release on a bond of 50,000 rupees.

== Death ==
She died on May 15, 2011 in Lahore in what the media reported as mysterious circumstances.

== Filmography ==
| # | Year | Title | Director | Language | Notes |
|---|---|---|---|---|---|
| 1 | 2006 | Chann Badshah | Muhammad Rasheed Malik | Punjabi | |
| 2 | 2007 | Ajj Da Badmash | Akram Khan | Punjabi | |
| 3 | 2007 | Honeymoon | Saeed Ali Khan | Urdu | |
| 4 | 2008 | Wehshi Gunda | Parvez Rana | Punjabi | |
| 5 | 2008 | Pyasa Badan | Rasheed Dogar | Urdu | |
| 6 | 2009 | Black Cat | Saeed Ali Khan | Urdu | |
| 7 | 2009 | Red Light Hotel | Saeed Ali Khan | Urdu | |
| 8 | 2009 | Nach Kay Yaar Manana | Masood Butt | Punjabi | |
| 9 | 2010 | Jabroo Tay Nizam | Imdad Hussain | Punjabi | |
| 10 | 2011 | Society Girl | Daud Butt | Urdu | |
| 11 | 2011 | Reshma Tay Shera | Imdad Hussain | Punjabi | |
| 12 | 2013 | No Tension | Roshan Malik | Punjabi | released after her death |

== See also ==
- List of unsolved deaths
