= Arkadiusz Sojka =

Polish footballer

Personal information
- Date of birth: 9 June 1980
- Place of birth: Krosno Odrzańskie, Poland
- Date of death: c. 15 June 2012 (aged 32)
- Place of death: Przesieka, Poland
- Height: 1.78 m (5 ft 10 in)
- Position: Striker

Senior career*
Years	Team	Apps	(Gls)
1997–2002	Karkonosze Jelenia Góra		
2003	Włókniarz Mirsk		
2003	Karkonosze Jelenia Góra		
2004	Stasiak Opoczno	17	(1)
2004–2007	KSZO Ostrowiec	73	(7)
2007	Polonia Bytom	11	(0)
2008	Pelikan Łowicz	15	(2)
2008–2009	Flota Świnoujście	43	(5)
2010	Chrobry Głogów	10	(2)
2010–2011	Dolcan Ząbki	6	(0)
2011–2012	Piast Dziwiszów		

Managerial career
- 2011–2012: Piast Dziwiszów (player-manager)
- * Club domestic league appearances and goals

Arkadiusz Sojka (9 June 1980 – c. 15 June 2012) was a Polish professional footballer who played as a striker.

Sojka went missing in June 2012. His body was not recovered until October 2012. The cause of death was not reported, but suicide was suspected.

== See also ==
- List of solved missing person cases (post-2000)
- List of unsolved deaths
