= Radomir Radović =

- Born: 1951
- Died: April 30, 1984 (aged 32–33); Orašac, Socialist Federal Republic of Yugoslavia
- Occupation: Civil engineering technician
- Known for: Trade union activism

Radomir Radović (1951 – 30 April 1984) was a civil engineering technician and trade unionist who advocated creating an independent trade union in SFR Yugoslavia. He was among the 28 members of Milovan Đilas's Open University arrested on 20 April 1984. He was found dead several days later, on 30 April, under unsolved circumstances.

== Early life and political engagement ==
Radomir Radović graduated from a vocational technical high school. He soon became involved in trade union activism.

He helped to organize a petition, circulated by the workers of the Belgrade engineering enterprise Minela, demanding the replacement and punishment of one of the directors, Radoje Stefanović, for misappropriation and theft. An investigation was started but soon dropped, the signatories being informed that Stefanović had been appointed to head the executive of the Belgrade City Council. Radović was sacked.

Radović then found a job at Hidrotehnika, where he was also involved in a workers' petition against Mikaina Savić, a judge in the Court of Associated Labor. The petition was ignored and the city's new top executive moved in to protect her.

In November 1982. Radović wrote to the Ninth Congress of the Union of Syndicates criticizing the system and suggesting measures to stop the financial crisis. He requested that the trade union be free from government control and a free association of workers, the right to strike, and punishment for those governing structures and individuals who contributed to the crisis. He requested that all government business be subject to control by the public, as well as advocating for the freedom of the press and a public dialog on all burning issues. Radović especially requested that the Congress condemn the juntas in Turkey and Poland. The ruling party treated this as "heretical" and connected it to support for Lech Wałęsa.

== Arrest and death ==
Radović was arrested on 20 April 1984 together with the 28 members of the Open University led by Milovan Đilas. During the night between the 20th and the 21st, he was interrogated by Ranko Savić, the brother of Mikaina Savić. He was released on the 21st, and then arrested again on the 22nd only to be released on the 23rd.

Radović was found dead in his weekend house in the village of Orašac near Obrenovac on 30 April 1984. Nineteen intellectuals, including Dobrica Ćosić, Mića Popović and Mihailo Marković, sent a letter regarding Radović's death to the State Secretary for Internal Affairs Stane Dolanc on 6 May 1984, demanding an inquiry into the death of Radomir Radović. The letter was published in the Index on Censorship magazine on 1 August 1984. This was the first petition in postwar Yugoslavia calling on the Interior Minister to account for an unexplained death or accept responsibility for it and resign from office. The ruling party stated that Radović's death was an act of suicide by pesticides.

== See also ==
- Belgrade Six
- List of unsolved deaths
