= Marc Bennett =

British travel advisor (c. 1967 – 2019)

- Born: c. 1967
- Died: 24 December 2019 (aged c. 51–52); Doha, Qatar
- Occupation: Travel advisor
- Known for: Mysterious circumstances of death
- Spouse: Nancy Bennett

Marc Bennett (c. 1967 – 24 December 2019) was a British travel advisor who died under mysterious circumstances in Doha, Qatar. Bennett was employed by the Qatar Airways company Discover Qatar to promote the image of Qatar following the nation's selection as the host of the 2022 FIFA World Cup. After leaving the job and showing interest in a rival Saudi company, Bennett was arrested and said that he was tortured. He was found hanged in his hotel room on 25 December 2019.

Following his death, Qatar Airways reported that he was arrested for stealing company secrets. Qatar Airways said that his death was unrelated to his work because he was a popular and valued former employee. Bennett's family dispute both stories; a British coroner did not record the death as suicide.

== Life and work ==
Marc Bennett was from Haywards Heath. He had played rugby union for the Harlequin F.C. under-21 team.

He had once been a senior figure at travel company Thomas Cook Group, and was headhunted by Qatar Airways to set-up and develop their promotional tourism arm, Discover Qatar, in 2012, with the aim of boosting tourism for the 2022 FIFA World Cup.

== Arrest and detention ==
In October 2019, Marc Bennett left his job with Discover Qatar, as he was unhappy, and told his former employers that he was planning to join a firm in Saudi Arabia, a nation with which Qatar has poor relations. Bennett was arrested at the Qatar Airways office in October 2019, accused by them of stealing confidential documents from the company. He was held in custody uncharged for three weeks before being released and forbidden from leaving Qatar; the authorities confiscated his passport as well as belongings. The West Sussex Coroners Court, hearing the case of his death, was told that Bennett had been deemed a national security threat to Qatar. After being released from custody, he went to live with a friend, who was disturbed by how timid and thin Bennett was. The friend went on holiday for Christmas, at which point Bennett moved into the Curve Hotel in Doha.

According to his family, he was both physically and mentally tortured while being held in custody. The Qatari government responded that they do not torture detainees. According to what Bennett told his family, he was handcuffed and blindfolded when he was arrested and, when in custody, was interrogated about the Saudi company. Bennett and his family said he was held in a room that was kept freezing by air conditioning, preventing him from being able to sleep. He was allowed to call his family from the detention centre, though he had been affected to the point he could barely talk. He self-described the physical torture as being routinely stripped, "blasted with high-pressure hoses, slammed against walls".

He was not offered legal advice. Representatives of the United Nations referred to such allegations of mistreatment as credible.

== Death ==
Bennett's wife, Nancy, contacted the Foreign Office with concern for his whereabouts when he did not respond to her messages on Christmas Eve. On Christmas Day 2019, Bennett was found hanged in his hotel room; his family were informed later in the day. His body was found by a receptionist. The Qatari police concluded that he committed suicide. However, the British coroners did not record a verdict of suicide, deeming it an unlikely cause and finding no evidence that Bennett wished to kill himself. The West Sussex Coroner heard that there was "only a cursory investigation" into Bennett's death by the Qatari authorities.

According to the Metro, Bennett was in good spirits on a video call with his family on 23 December. Nancy reported to British media that Bennett's general personality; his interest in attending a Christmas party at the time; and the condition of his hotel room when he was found, which she explained as "There was no note, nothing was left. There was a coffee cup, there was food. It was honestly as if there had been a knock at the door, you put your book down, you go and open the door, and then you would go back to reading your book", made suicide seem not possible.

Nancy gave a television interview about her husband to Channel 4 News on 29 September 2022.

== See also ==
- List of unsolved deaths
