= Lead masks case =

Pair of unsolved deaths in Brazil

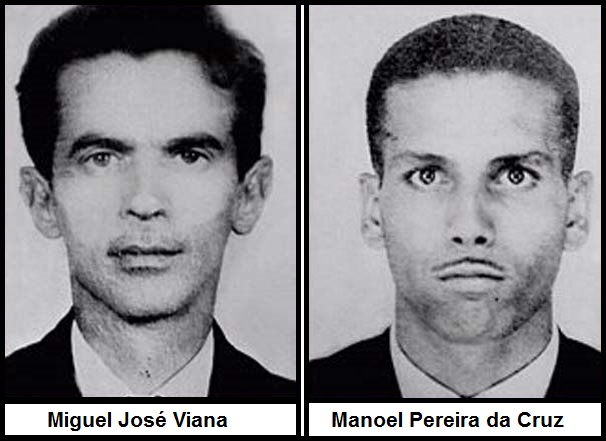
Miguel José Viana and Manoel Pereira da Cruz

The lead masks case (Portuguese: mistério das máscaras de chumbo, lit. 'mystery of the lead masks') involves a series of events which led to the death of two Brazilian electronics technicians, Manoel Pereira da Cruz and Miguel José Viana, who had last been seen by their families on August 17, 1966. Their bodies were discovered on August 20, 1966, and the cause of their deaths has never been determined.

== Events ==
On the afternoon of August 20, 1966, a young boy was flying a kite on the Morro do Vintém (Vintém Hill) in Niterói, Rio de Janeiro, when he came upon the corpses of two men. He reported the bodies to the authorities, who attempted to respond but struggled to climb the difficult terrain of the hill. A small group of police and firefighters eventually reached the bodies the day after they were reported. The bodies were lying next to each other and were partly covered by grass. Each body wore a formal suit, an eye mask made of lead, and a waterproof coat. There were no signs of major trauma or any evidence of a struggle. Next to the corpses, police found an empty water bottle and a packet containing two wet towels. A small notebook was also identified, on which were written the cryptic instructions, "16:30 estar no local determinado. 18:30 ingerir cápsulas, após efeito proteger metais aguardar sinal mascara" ("16:30 be at the specified location. 18:30 ingest capsules, after the effect protect metals await signal mask").

The two men were identified as Manoel Pereira da Cruz and Miguel José Viana, two electronics technicians from Campos dos Goytacazes, a town several kilometers to the northeast of Rio de Janeiro city. Following an investigation, police reconstructed a plausible narrative of the men's last days. On August 17, Cruz and Viana left Campos dos Goytacazes with the stated intent of purchasing materials for work. The two men then boarded a bus to Niterói, and arrived at 2:30 pm (14:30 24-hour time). Evidence shows that the waterproof coats were purchased at a shop there, and one bottle of water from a local bar. Upon being interviewed, the waitress from the bar described Miguel as "very nervous", and noticed he frequently checked his watch. That is the last time they were known to have been seen alive; it is presumed they went directly from the bar to the spot at which they were discovered.

No obvious injuries were discovered at the scene, nor later at the autopsy which took place weeks later. The coroner's office was very busy at the time, and when the autopsy was finally conducted, the internal organs of the two victims were too badly decomposed for reliable testing. Because of this delay, testing for toxic substances was not carried out.

== Theories ==
There are multiple theories that have been proposed to explain this case, ranging from foul play to UFOs. One theory revolves around the testimony of a friend of the two men, who claimed that they were members of a group of "scientific spiritualists". This theory purports that the men were apparently attempting to contact extraterrestrials or spirits using psychedelic drugs; believing that such an encounter would be accompanied by blinding light, the men cut and wore metal masks to shield their eyes. The two then ultimately died of a simultaneous drug overdose. This account is corroborated by the esoteric diary entry found at the scene and by mask-making materials and literature concerning spirits found at the men's homes.

== See also ==
- List of unsolved deaths
