= Death of Rogelio Martinez =

Unsolved death of a USBP agent

Rogelio Martinez
- Born: 1981; Texas, U.S.
- Died: November 19, 2017 (aged 35–36); El Paso, Texas, U.S.
- Occupation: United States Border Patrol agent
- Known for: Unexplained death

Rogelio Martinez (c. 1981 – November 19, 2017) was an agent of the United States Border Patrol who died in the line of duty on November 19, 2017, in Culberson County, Texas. His cause of death remains unsolved despite a four-month investigation by the FBI.

== Early life and career ==
Martinez was born circa 1981. He lived in El Paso, he was engaged, and he had an 11-year-old son. He served in the Border Patrol from August 12, 2013, to November 19, 2017, and he was based out of the CBP station in Van Horn, Texas.

== Death ==
On November 18, he was patrolling the border in Culberson County, Texas, with another agent, Stephen Garland, who called for back-up. Later that day, Martinez was found unconscious in a culvert off Interstate 10, 30 miles away from Mexico, and Garland was unable to remember what had happened. Martinez died in an El Paso hospital the following day, on November 19; he was 36. His funeral was attended by Attorney General Jeff Sessions.

== Public reactions ==
President Donald Trump, Governor Greg Abbott, and Senator Ted Cruz suggested Martinez had been murdered, and Brandon Judd of the National Border Patrol Council added he must have been "attacked from behind." President Trump added Martinez's death buttressed his support for the construction of a border wall between Mexico and the United States.

By February 2018, the F.B.I. had been unable to determine whether his death was murder or an accident during the course of their four-month investigation, despite conducting 650 interviews. An internal memorandum authored by Acting Commissioner Kevin McAleenan suggested Martinez may have fallen in the culvert, but he added that the death remained unsolved due to an "absence of evidence."

== See also ==
- List of unsolved deaths
