= Billhead =

Receipts used in business transactions

A fancy billhead receipt, dated 1895

Billhead receipts are receipts that were commonly used in business transactions from the late 1860s through the early 1940s. They can be found in present-day transactions, although they are less common today.

Many billhead receipts were illustrated and decorated with fancy steel engravings, while others carried no illustrations. In either case, the receipt was important, as it stood as your proof of delivery. Most billheads would bear the company's name and address, a unique invoice number, the payment terms, line items for products or services, a total, and (optionally) handwritten notes.

== Vintage ephemera ==
Billheads are considered to be vintage ephemera. Some collect billheads from a certain state, region, or town; others base their collections on types of illustrations. In some cases, a relative or ancestor may have owned the business or even have signed the document.
