= Killing of Paul Byrne =

Unsolved death in Ireland

Paul "Frank" Byrne was an Irishman who was last seen alive near his home in Kilmartin Green, Tallaght, Dublin on 15 July 2009. He was seen leaving the area in a 2000–registration wine-coloured Mitsubishi Carisma with other men. This was the last time he was seen alive – he was 20 years old at the time. His mother reported him missing to Tallaght Garda station the next day.

== Discovery of remains ==
His skeletal remains were found by a forest worker in a wooded area near Blessington, County Wicklow on 29 July 2010.

== Investigation ==
As of July 2025, five people had been arrested as part of the investigation into his death. Gardaí appealed for information in relation to his death in July 2025.
