= National Register of Historic Places listings in Charles Mix County, South Dakota =

Location of Charles Mix County in South Dakota

This is a list of the National Register of Historic Places listings in Charles Mix County, South Dakota.

This is intended to be a complete list of the properties and districts on the National Register of Historic Places in Charles Mix County, South Dakota, United States. The locations of National Register properties and districts for which the latitude and longitude coordinates are included below, may be seen in a map.

There are 15 properties and districts listed on the National Register in the county. Another property was once listed but has been removed.
This National Park Service list is complete through NPS recent listings posted May 30, 2025.

== Current listings ==
	Name on the Register	Image	Date listed	Location	City or town	Description
1	Charles Mix County Courthouse	Charles Mix County Courthouse	February 10, 1993 (#92001856)	Main St. between 4th and 5th Sts. 43°09′20″N 98°32′16″W	Lake Andes	
2	Church of Christ in LaRoche Township	Church of Christ in LaRoche Township	July 1, 1982 (#82003920)	Highway 50; 43°27′20″N 99°04′57″W	Academy	
3	Engel Hotel	Engel Hotel	February 21, 2012 (#12000035)	202 Main St. 43°09′22″N 98°32′34″W	Lake Andes	
4	Farmers State Bank of Platte	Farmers State Bank of Platte	January 27, 1983 (#83003004)	404 S. Main St. 43°23′13″N 98°50′42″W	Platte	
5	Geddes Historic District	Geddes Historic District	May 8, 1973 (#73001737)	Off Highway 50; 43°15′15″N 98°41′43″W	Geddes	
6	Henry Cool Park	Henry Cool Park	March 15, 2011 (#11000083)	0.5 miles (0.80 km) north of the intersection of Highway 50 and 365th Ave; 43°23′16″N 98°53′35″W	Platte	
7	Holy Fellowship Episcopal Church		June 5, 1975 (#75001712)	Southeast of Greenwood; 42°55′23″N 98°23′10″W	Greenwood	
8	Jacobson School	Jacobson School	February 5, 2003 (#02001762)	289th St. 43°11′55″N 98°19′38″W	Armour	
9	Lake Andes Carnegie Library	Lake Andes Carnegie Library	June 2, 2000 (#00000598)	500 Main St. 43°09′21″N 98°32′19″W	Lake Andes	Carnegie library built in 1911, still in use in 2022.
10	Marty Mission School Gymnasium and St. Therese Hall	Marty Mission School Gymnasium and St. Therese Hall	January 4, 2012 (#11001012)	Southwest corner of 303rd St. & 388th Ave. 42°59′33″N 98°25′32″W	Marty	part of Schools in South Dakota MPS
11	Pickstown Fire and Police Station	Pickstown Fire and Police Station	March 26, 2020 (#100005109)	108 Lewis Ave. 43°04′07″N 98°31′55″W	Pickstown	
12	Pratt & Gjolme Building	Pratt & Gjolme Building	June 8, 2007 (#07000532)	500 S. Main; 43°23′10″N 98°50′42″W	Platte	Listed in the NRHP as "Pratt & Cjolme"
13	Rising Hail Colony	Rising Hail Colony	April 28, 1975 (#75001713)	5 miles (8.0 km) northwest of Greenwood along Seven Mile Creek; 43°00′13″N 98°28′58″W	Greenwood	
14	Security State Bank of Dante	Security State Bank of Dante	November 1, 2018 (#100003072)	320 Main St. 43°02′18″N 98°11′05″W	Dante	
15	Wagner House	Wagner House	November 19, 2007 (#07001209)	29649 401st. Ave. 43°05′31″N 98°10′31″W	Wagner	

== Former listing ==
	Name on the Register	Image	Date listed	Date removed	Location	City or town	Description
1	South Dakota Dept. of Transportation Bridge No. 12-503-230		December 9, 1993 (#93001278)	December 15, 1999	Local road over Choteau Creek	Wagner	

== See also ==
- List of National Historic Landmarks in South Dakota
- National Register of Historic Places listings in South Dakota
