= Selma Walker =

Native American social worker and activist (1925–1997)

- Walker in 1986
- Born: Thelma Lois Sully; December 14, 1925; Greenwood, Charles Mix County, South Dakota
- Died: January 3, 1997 (aged 71); Columbus, Franklin County, Ohio
- Other names: Thelma Kludt, Selma Lois Walker, Selma Sully-Walker, Thelma Walker
- Citizenship: Yankton Sioux Tribe of South Dakota and U.S.
- Occupations: Social worker, social services administrator
- Years active: 1975–1996
- Known for: social work, Native American rights activism
- Children: Carol Welch

Selma Walker (December 14, 1925 – January 3, 1997) was an American social worker and the founder and director of the Native American Center of Columbus, Ohio. She was a Dakota of Santee Dakota and Sisseton Dakota ancestry, and a "tribal member of the Yankton Sioux Tribe of South Dakota", according to the Native American Indian Center of Central Ohio. She was inducted into the Ohio Women's Hall of Fame in 1986.

== Early life and education ==
Thelma Lois Sully was born on December 14, 1925, in Greenwood, Charles Mix County, South Dakota, on the Yankton Indian Reservation to Cora May Quinn and John C. Sully. Cora was an enrolled member of the Yankton Sioux Tribe of South Dakota. However, she was Sisseton Dakota and lived at the Yankton reservation. John was an enrolled member at the Santee Sioux Nation in Knox County, Nebraska. Sully grew up on the Yankton reservation and attended the Saint Paul Indian Children's School in Marty, South Dakota, with her siblings. According to the Native American Indian Center of Central Ohio, she was enrolled the Yankton Sioux Tribe. The family were close friends with the family of Sam Necklace, who was influential in introducing the Native American Church in the Yankton Sioux Tribe. Necklace was the chief priest of the peyote religion and John was one of his roadmen, a person who could conduct peyote healing services.

Cora and John divorced, and by 1937, she had remarried Asa Fastbear (also known as Esau Fastbear or Asa Sweetcorn). After the divorce, Sully sometimes lived with her father on the Yankton reservation, and sometimes with her mother on the Lake Traverse Indian Reservation in Sisseton, South Dakota. She married Elmer Kludt around 1950, but they divorced the following year. By the time of her father's death in 1965, Sully was using the name Selma Walker and was residing at Lockbourne Air Force Base, in Lockbourne, Ohio. Her husband was in the army. The couple had a daughter, Carol, and moved often, living in England for a time.

== Career ==
In 1975, Walker was hired by the Tecumseh Confederacy Manpower Program in Xenia, Ohio to assist Native Americans living in the Columbus, Ohio metropolitan area with job placements and other needs.| She often worked out of her car or from home to assist her clients. She helped them with obtaining identification cards, high school equivalency certificates and began a clothing drive to provide them with basic necessities. Eager to establish a focal point for the urban Indigenous population, in 1977, she and others, sold fishing bait to stores to raise enough money to pay rent on a building on South High Street. The duplex they were able to rent, became the home of the Native American Center of Columbus. The center provided food, clothing, and household items to members of the Native American community, as well as emergency, counseling and employment referral services across metro Columbus and it sponsored cultural events. The center also coordinated services for the Ross County Community Action Community.

Keeping the center open was difficult, as funding was obtained only through initiatives Walker created. In 1983, the Native American Center of Akron paid the operational expenses and salaries for Walker and her staff. Beginning in 1984, she organized fund-raising drives each May and September, through cultural events like pow wows to cover the operational costs. She also gave lectures to churches and other local groups to raise awareness of Native cultures and arranged for Asa Primeaux, Sam Necklace's grandson, to serve as the spiritual advisor of the center. For a decade, he traveled between the Yankton Reservation and Ohio to mentor the urban Indigenous community. Her work was recognized by numerous local honors, such as the Community Service Award of the Columbus Dispatch, the Clifford Tyree Award of the City of Columbus Department of Human Services, and induction into the Ohio Women's Hall of Fame in 1986.

In 1990, Walker led protest marches to the Ohio Statehouse hoping to thwart a bill proposed by State Senator Roy Ray, which would extended the authority of the Ohio State Archaeological and Historical Society over preservation of all historic artifacts on all public property in the state. The protest called for Native American artifacts, and particularly Indigenous remains, to be returned to the tribes. Ray agreed to alter the text of the bill to make it clear that it did "not apply to Indian burial remains". In the 1990s, Walker's daughter Carol began working at the Native American Center as an assistant director to her mother. The facility was lost to a fire in 1992 and a fundraising drive began. The drive was successful and the Native American Center reopened on April 1, 1993, at 756 Parsons Avenue in Columbus. Walker continued as director of the facility until 1996, when her daughter Carol became its executive director.

== Death and legacy ==
Walker died on January 3, 1997, in Columbus, Franklin County, Ohio. The facility she founded, now known as the Native American Indian Center of Central Ohio annually hosts the Selma Walker Memorial Day Powwow in her honor, and also periodically presents the Selma Walker Award for Lifetime Achievement in Human Rights Activism. It was awarded to Bob Fitrakis in 2003. The center continues to be a non-profit organization and is not funded by any government administration, but operates solely from donations and grants.
