= Holy Fellowship Episcopal Church (Greenwood, South Dakota) =

Historic church in South Dakota, United States

- U.S. National Register of Historic Places
- Location within South Dakota Location within the United States
- Location: Southeast of Greenwood, South Dakota
- Coordinates: 42°55′23″N 98°23′10″W
- Area: 1 acre (0.40 ha)
- Built: 1886
- Architectural style: Carpenter Gothic
- NRHP reference No.: 75001712
- Added to NRHP: June 5, 1975

Holy Fellowship Episcopal Church is an historic Carpenter Gothic Episcopal church built in 1886 near Greenwood on the Yankton Indian Reservation in Charles Mix County, in the U.S. state of South Dakota. In 1975 it was added to the National Register of Historic Places.

The missionary church was established following 1869 invitation of the Yankton Sioux.

It is one-story building with a cruciform plan. Most of its windows are topped by paired lancet arches.

== See also ==
- List of Registered Historic Places in South Dakota
