= Clearfield Colony, South Dakota =

- Census-designated place
- Location within South Dakota Location within the United States
- Coordinates: 43°08′38″N 98°08′31″W
- Country: United States
- State: South Dakota
- County: Charles Mix

Area
  - Total: 0.30 sq mi (0.78 km^{2})
  - Land: 0.30 sq mi (0.78 km^{2})
  - Water: 0 sq mi (0.00 km^{2})
- Elevation: 1,729 ft (527 m)

Population (2020)
  - Total: 99
  - Density: 327.1/sq mi (126.29/km^{2})
- Time zone: UTC-6 (Central (CST))
  - Summer (DST): UTC-5 (CDT)
- ZIP Code: 57330 (Delmont)
- Area code: 605
- FIPS code: 46-12508
- GNIS feature ID: 2813005

Clearfield Colony is a Hutterite colony and census-designated place (CDP) within the Yankton Indian Reservation in Charles Mix County, South Dakota, United States. It was first listed as a CDP prior to the 2020 census. The population of the CDP was 99 at the 2020 census.

It is in the eastern part of the county, 10 miles (16 km) south of Delmont and 12 miles (19 km) northeast of Wagner.

== Demographics ==
Historical population
Census	Pop.	Note	%±
2020	99		—
U.S. Decennial Census

== Education ==
The school district is Tripp-Delmont School District 33-5.
