= Charles Eli Mix =

American government worker (1810–1878)

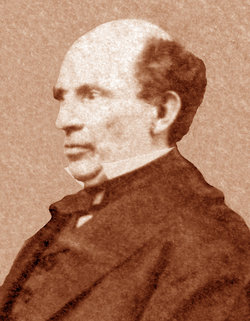

9th Commissioner of Indian Affairs
- In office June 14, 1858 – November 8, 1858
- President: James Buchanan
- Preceded by: James W. Denver
- Succeeded by: James W. Denver

Personal details
- Born: February 4, 1810 New Haven, Connecticut, U.S.
- Died: January 15, 1878 (aged 67) Georgetown, Washington, D.C., U.S.
- Resting place: Oak Hill Cemetery; Washington, D.C., U.S.
- Spouse: Catherine Upperman (m. 1829)
- Children: 9

Charles Eli Mix (February 4, 1810 – January 15, 1878) was an American civil servant. He served as chief clerk of the Bureau of Indian Affairs from 1850 to 1869. For a brief period in 1858, Mix was commissioner of Indian Affairs. During his time as commissioner, he oversaw the signing of a treaty with the Yankton Sioux Tribe of the Dakota Territory (present-day South Dakota). The Treaty of Washington was signed on April 19, 1858 and ratified by the United States Senate on February 16, 1859. Charles Mix County, South Dakota, organized in 1862, is named after him.

== Early life ==
Charles Eli Mix was born on February 4, 1810, in New Haven, Connecticut. He was educated at the Lancaster School in New Haven. At the age of sixteen, Mix moved to Georgetown, Washington, D.C.

== Career ==
After moving to Georgetown, Mix entered the mercantile business. His business failed during the Panic of 1837.

In 1838, Mix was appointed by President Martin Van Buren as a clerk in the Bureau of Indian Affairs. He was later appointed as chief clerk, under Secretary of the Interior Thomas Ewing, in November 1850. While chief clerk, Mix drafted the Yankton Treaty of April 19, 1858, with the Yankton Sioux Tribe. He was also known for drafting the 1850 Office Copy of the Laws, Regulations, Etc., an important set of regulations for implementing and governing Indian affairs. He served as acting commissioner in August 1853 and June 1856 while George Washington Manypenny was traveling in Nebraska and on temporary absence, respectively. He again served as acting commissioner in April 1857 after the resignation of Manypenny. He was appointed as commissioner of Indian Affairs, after the resignation of James W. Denver, serving from June 14, 1858 to November 8, 1858. Mix resigned, preferring to work behind the scenes. Mix retired from the Bureau of Indian Affairs in 1869.

== Personal life ==
Mix married Catharine Upperman, of Georgetown, in 1829. They had five sons and four daughters.

Mix owned a farm, near Ball's Crossroads in Alexandria County, Virginia.

Mix died on January 15, 1878, at his home at 164 High Street in Georgetown. He is interred at Oak Hill Cemetery in the Georgetown neighborhood of Washington, D.C., along with his wife and children.

== Legacy ==
Charles Mix County, South Dakota, organized in May 1862, was named after Mix.
