= Albert Kocer =

American politician (1930–2018)

Member of the South Dakota House of Representatives from the 20th district
- In office 1977–1994

Personal details
- Born: July 10, 1930 Dante, South Dakota
- Died: June 12, 2018 (aged 87) Wagner, South Dakota
- Party: Democratic
- Spouse: Rita A. Gau
- Children: Three
- Profession: Businessman

Albert J. Kocer (July 10, 1930 - June 12, 2018) was an American politician in the state of South Dakota. He was a member of the South Dakota House of Representatives from 1977 to 1992.

Kocer served in the Korean War between 1951 and 1953. Afterwards, he ran a farm with his wife for sixteen years, until they sold it in 1969 and started a store selling used tractor parts.

In 1984, Kocer was ordained as a Deacon in the Roman Catholic Diocese of Sioux Falls.
