= Lakeview Colony, South Dakota =

- Census-designated place
- Location within South Dakota Location within the United States
- Coordinates: 43°13′13″N 98°27′23″W
- Country: United States
- State: South Dakota
- County: Charles Mix

Area
  - Total: 0.99 sq mi (2.57 km^{2})
  - Land: 0.99 sq mi (2.57 km^{2})
  - Water: 0 sq mi (0.00 km^{2})
- Elevation: 1,513 ft (461 m)

Population (2020)
  - Total: 0
  - Density: 0/sq mi (0/km^{2})
- Time zone: UTC-6 (Central (CST))
  - Summer (DST): UTC-5 (CDT)
- ZIP Code: 57356 (Lake Andes)
- Area code: 605
- FIPS code: 46-35671
- GNIS feature ID: 2813003

Lakeview Colony is a Hutterite colony and census-designated place (CDP) within the Yankton Indian Reservation in Charles Mix County, South Dakota, United States. It was first listed as a CDP prior to the 2020 census. The population of the CDP was 0 at the 2020 census.

It is in the central part of the county, 8 miles (13 km) northeast of the city of Lake Andes, the county seat. It overlooks Lake Andes, a natural water body which lies 2 miles (3 km) to the east.

== Demographics ==
Historical population
Census	Pop.	Note	%±
2020	0		—
U.S. Decennial Census

== Education ==
The school district is Andes Central School District 11-1.
