= Platte Colony, South Dakota =

- Census-designated place
- Location within South Dakota Location within the United States
- Coordinates: 43°28′04″N 99°07′34″W
- Country: United States
- State: South Dakota
- County: Charles Mix

Area
  - Total: 0.31 sq mi (0.80 km^{2})
  - Land: 0.31 sq mi (0.80 km^{2})
  - Water: 0 sq mi (0.00 km^{2})
- Elevation: 1,706 ft (520 m)

Population (2020)
  - Total: 299
  - Density: 970.3/sq mi (374.64/km^{2})
- Time zone: UTC-6 (Central (CST))
  - Summer (DST): UTC-5 (CDT)
- ZIP Code: 57361 (Platte)
- Area code: 605
- FIPS code: 46-50310
- GNIS feature ID: 2813004

Platte Colony is a Hutterite colony and census-designated place (CDP) in Charles Mix County, South Dakota, United States. It was first listed as a CDP prior to the 2020 census. The population of the CDP was 299 at the 2020 census.

It is in the northwest corner of the county, 20 miles (32 km) northwest of Platte, the nearest incorporated place. It is 2 miles (3 km) northeast of Lake Francis Case, a reservoir on the Missouri River.

== Demographics ==
Historical population
Census	Pop.	Note	%±
2020	299		—
U.S. Decennial Census

== Education ==
The school district is Platte-Geddes School District 11-5.
