= Yankton Indian Reservation =

Coordinates: 43.0833°N 98.3833°W

- Indian reservation
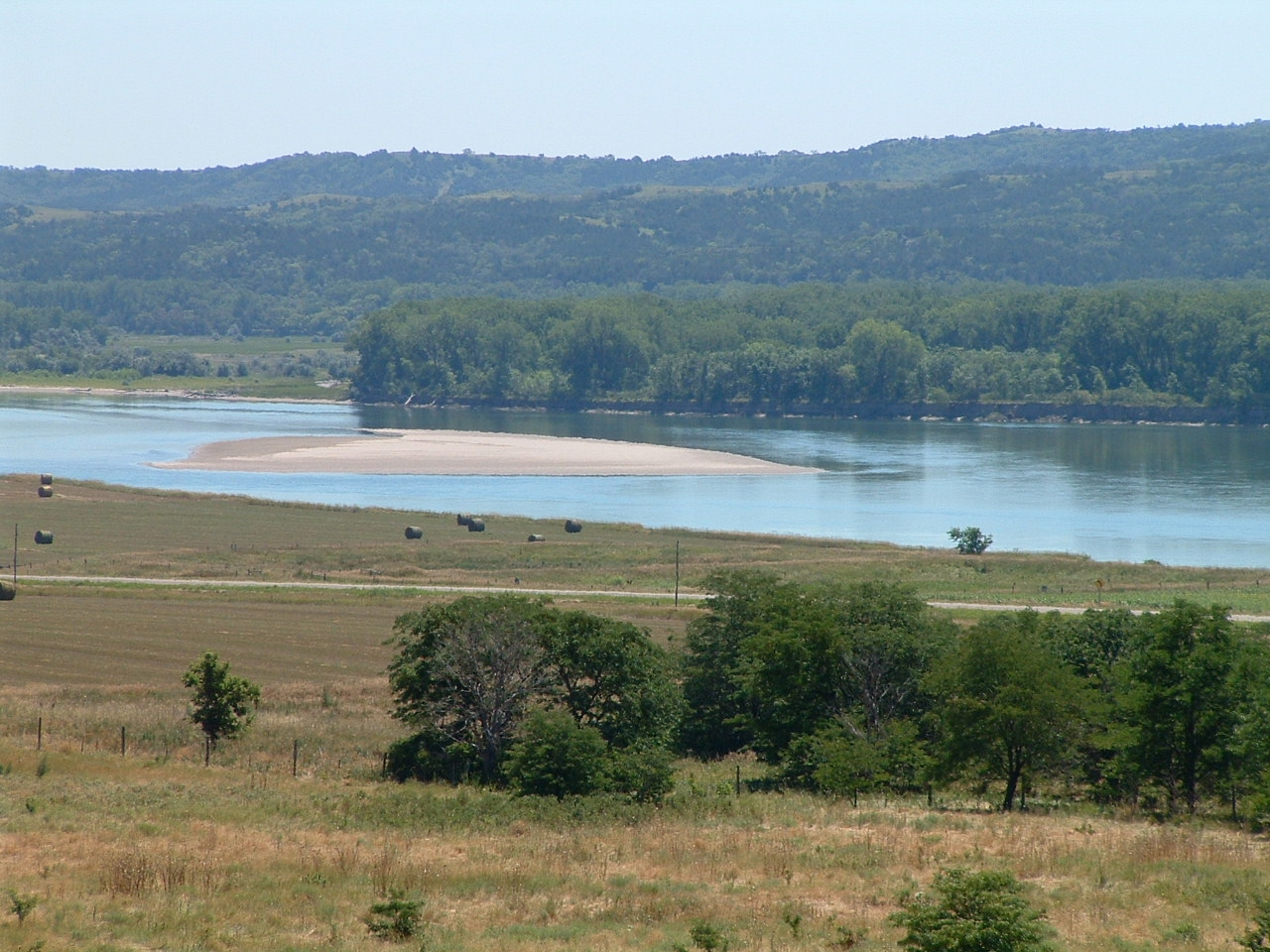
- Looking toward Sunshine Bottom

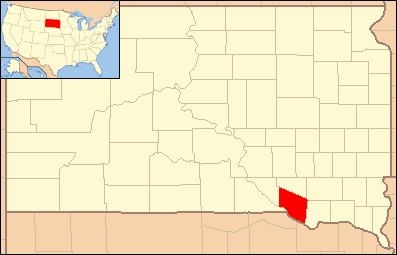
- Location of the Yankton Indian Reservation
- Tribe: Yankton Sioux
- Country: United States
- State: South Dakota
- County: Charles Mix
- Headquarters: Wagner

Area
  - Total: 1,772.60 km^{2} (684.406 sq mi)
- Website: Yankton Sioux Tribe

The Yankton Indian Reservation is the homeland of the Yankton Sioux Tribe of the Dakota tribe.

The reservation occupies the easternmost 60 percent of Charles Mix County in southeastern South Dakota, United States and abuts the Missouri River along its southwest border. It has a land area of 665.712 sq mi (1,724.186 km^{2}) and a total area (land and water) of 684.406 sq mi (1,772.604 km^{2}), and a resident population of 6,500 persons as of the 2000 census. The population as of the 2010 census was 6,465 inhabitants. After the Osage Indian Reservation, it is the second-largest Indian reservation that is located entirely within one county.

The largest community on the reservation is the city of Wagner, which is the location of the tribal headquarters. The blues-rock group Indigenous is originally from this community, as is early 20th-century author and activist Zitkala-Sa.

== Tribal information ==
- Reservation: Diminished Yankton Reservation; part of Charles Mix County
- Division: Dakota (Yankton)
- Bands: Ihanktonwan
- Land Area: Approximately 438,100 acres total (425,900 land and 12,200 water)
- Tribal Headquarters: Wagner, SD
- Time Zone: Central
- Traditional Language: Nakota/Dakota
- Enrolled members living within diminished area: 6,500 in 2000; 6,465 in 2010
- Major Employers: Fort Randall Casino, Indian Health Service, tribal office, Bureau of Indian Affairs, Marty Indian School
- Website: https://www.yanktonsiouxtribe.net/

== Government ==
- Charter: None; Constitution and Bylaws: Yes - non-IRA
- Date Approved: April 24, 1963
- Name of Governing Body: Yankton Sioux Tribal Business and Claims Committee
- Number of committee members: (5) five committee members
- Dates of Constitutional amendments: March 20, 1975
- Number of Executive Officers: (4) Chairman, Vice-Chairman, Secretary, Treasurer

== Elections ==
- Primary election is in July and the General is every two years on the first Thursday in September. Executive officers are elected at large and serve two year terms in office.
- Number of Election districts or communities: 5

== Meetings ==
- Regular business meeting are held once a week usually on Tuesday. An annual General Council Meeting is set for the third Tuesday in August each year.
- Quorum number: 5 members

== Notable leaders, past and present ==
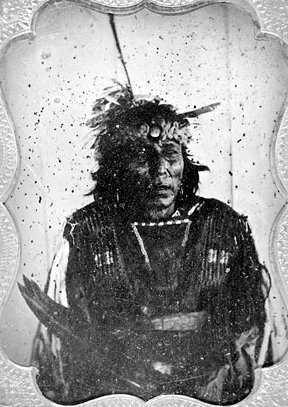
Smutty Bear in 1857

- Chief Struck by the Ree (1804–1888, Yankton) –As chief, Struck by the Ree managed to befriend the whites, yet remain dedicated and loyal to his people. He died in 1888 at Greenwood.
- Chief Running Bull, Tatankaiyanka (1826–1900, Yankton) – He succeeded Chief Struck by the Ree. Running Bull signed the Treaty of 1858. He was the son of Zuyesa ("Warrior"), who had signed the Treaty of 1837, ceding tribal lands east of the Mississippi to the U.S.
- Chief Smutty Bear, Mato Sabi Ceya (1790?–1865, Ihanktonwan) – his name was said to mean "He Paints Himself Dark Like A Bear". He signed four treaties with the US: the Treaty of 1825, the Fourth Treaty of Prairie du Chien of 1830, the Fort Laramie Treaty of 1851, and the Treaty of 1858. He was a strong defender and believer in tribal sovereignty. Spellings of his name varied: Maw-too-an-be-kin, Matto-sa-becha, Mak-toe-sah-bi-chis, and Ma-to-sa-be-che-a. In modern Dakota writing systems, his name would be spelled as Mathó Sab'íč'iye (New Lakota Dictionary) or Maṭo Sab'ic'iye (University of Minnesota).

== Education ==
Marty Indian School in Marty, affiliated with the Bureau of Indian Education (BIE), is on the reservation.

== Communities ==
- Dante
- Lake Andes
- Marty
- Pickstown
- Ravinia
- Wagner
- Greenwood
