= Doug Eggers =

American football player (1930–2025)

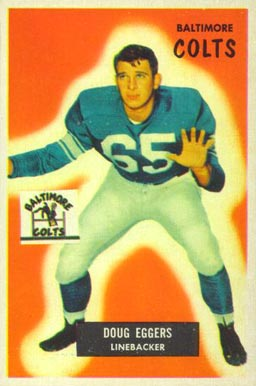
- Eggers on a 1955 Bowman football card

No. 67, 51
- Position: Linebacker

Personal information
- Born: September 21, 1930; Wagner, South Dakota, U.S.
- Died: June 3, 2025 (aged 94)
- Listed height: 6 ft 0 in (1.83 m)
- Listed weight: 213 lb (97 kg)

Career information
- High school: Wagner
- College: South Dakota State
- NFL draft: 1952: undrafted

Career history
- Baltimore Colts (1954–1957); Chicago Cardinals (1958)
- Stats at Pro Football Reference

Douglas Boyd Eggers (September 21, 1930 – June 3, 2025) was an American professional football player who was a linebacker for five seasons in the National Football League (NFL) with the Baltimore Colts and Chicago Cardinals. He played college football for the South Dakota State Jackrabbits.

== Early life ==
Eggers attended Wagner High School in Wagner, South Dakota, where he starred in football, basketball and track.

== College career ==
At South Dakota State University, Eggers lettered three straight years for the Jackrabbits, including the team's undefeated 1950 season. He was team captain and earned all-North Central Conference honors in 1951. He graduated in 1952.

== Professional career ==
Eggers was drafted into the United States Army in November 1952. He played on the post football team for two seasons at Fort Belvoir in Virginia. The team's coach, future Oakland Raiders owner Al Davis, later arranged tryouts for Eggers with the Philadelphia Eagles and Baltimore Colts. Upon his discharge from the army, Eggers signed with the Baltimore Colts in January 1954 and played in 46 games for the team from 1954 to 1957. Eggers played in eight games for the Chicago Cardinals during the 1958 season.

== Personal life ==
After his football career, Eggers owned the Chesapeake Supply and Equipment Company until retiring in 1978.

Eggers was inducted into the South Dakota State Jackrabbit Sports Hall of Fame in 1980, the South Dakota Sports Hall of Fame in 2021, and the Wagner Athletic Hall of Fame in 2019.

Eggers died on June 3, 2025, at the age of 94.
