= Jack Sully =

American cattle rustler and outlaw (1850–1904)

Jack Sully (c. 1850 – May 16, 1904), also Arthur McDonald, was an American cattle rustler and outlaw. He was also elected Sheriff of Charles Mix County, South Dakota.

== Biography ==
Jack Sully was born Arthur McDonald in Virginia circa 1850. Sully graduated from an American or Canadian college and was living in Hamilton, Ontario, by the early 1870s. During that decade, he moved to the southern area of the Dakota Territory (to what is now South Dakota) and gained employment as a cowboy. There, he became a skillful horse rider as well as a good shooter. In 1872, Sully was elected Charles Mix County, South Dakota, sheriff in a landslide, winning the vote 61-1. However, election observers noted that this tally placed the number of ballots cast greater than the number of people who actually voted.

The cowboy soon became acquainted with criminals, and by 1880 had become an outlaw and married a Sioux woman named Mary. Sully and his wife moved to the Rosebud Indian Reservation, and Sully became the leader of an outlaw gang which caused the loss of hundreds of cattle and horses from Dakota Territory properties each year. In his early days, Sully also caused the Government of the United States trouble when he cut timber from government-owned property to sell at the market.

By the early 1890s, the cattle rustlers had reached into Canada, with stolen Saskatchewan and Alberta cattle being found in American markets, and vice versa. Law enforcement remained unaware of the perpetrators of the crimes. By 1900, the rustling gang had accumulated over 12 members, stolen 50,000 cattle and 3,000 horses, as well as killed seven settlers on the Missouri River. In 1901, law enforcement forced Sully to retreat to Canada, but he returned two years later, in 1903. On an unknown date, Sully was arrested and held at Mitchell on a cattle rustling charge, but escaped from prison and eluded officers until May 1904. During that month, the new United States Deputy Marshal, Johnny Petrie, who had been a close friend of Sully's until he discovered his illegal activities, shot the outlaw when he refused to surrender in a stand at Rosebud Indian Reservation. By 1906, law enforcement officers had forced Sully's old gang to disband.
