= Ravinia, South Dakota =

- Town
- Location in Charles Mix County and the state of South Dakota
- Coordinates: 43°08′11″N 98°25′37″W
- Country: United States
- State: South Dakota
- County: Charles Mix
- Incorporated: 1910

Area
  - Total: 0.25 sq mi (0.64 km^{2})
  - Land: 0.25 sq mi (0.64 km^{2})
  - Water: 0 sq mi (0.00 km^{2})
- Elevation: 1,499 ft (457 m)

Population (2020)
  - Total: 71
  - Density: 286.6/sq mi (110.65/km^{2})
- Time zone: UTC-6 (Central (CST))
  - Summer (DST): UTC-5 (CDT)
- ZIP code: 57356
- Area code: 605
- FIPS code: 46-53220
- GNIS feature ID: 1267545

Ravinia is a town in Charles Mix County, South Dakota, United States. The population was 71 at the 2020 census.

Ravinia was laid out in 1909.

== Geography ==
According to the United States Census Bureau, the town has a total area of 0.25 square miles (0.65 km^{2}), all land.

== Transportation ==
- YST Transit buses
- US Highway 281
- US Highway 18
- South Dakota Highway 50
- Charles Mix County Road 21

== Demographics ==
Historical population
| Census | Pop. | Note | %± |
|---|---|---|---|
| 1910 | 81 | | — |
| 1920 | 199 | | 145.7% |
| 1930 | 157 | | −21.1% |
| 1940 | 155 | | −1.3% |
| 1950 | 200 | | 29.0% |
| 1960 | 164 | | −18.0% |
| 1970 | 109 | | −33.5% |
| 1980 | 88 | | −19.3% |
| 1990 | 79 | | −10.2% |
| 2000 | 79 | | 0.0% |
| 2010 | 61 | | −22.8% |
| 2020 | 71 | | 16.4% |
U.S. Decennial Census

=== 2010 census ===
As of the census of 2010, there were 61 people, 22 households, and 14 families living in the town. The population density was 244.0 inhabitants per square mile (94.2/km^{2}). There were 36 housing units at an average density of 144.0 per square mile (55.6/km^{2}). The racial makeup of the town was 24.6% White, 3.3% African American, 65.6% Native American, 1.6% from other races, and 4.9% from two or more races. Hispanic or Latino of any race were 6.6% of the population.

There were 22 households, of which 27.3% had children under the age of 18 living with them, 36.4% were married couples living together, 18.2% had a female householder with no husband present, 9.1% had a male householder with no wife present, and 36.4% were non-families. 36.4% of all households were made up of individuals, and 13.6% had someone living alone who was 65 years of age or older. The average household size was 2.77 and the average family size was 3.57.

The median age in the town was 38.5 years. 36.1% of residents were under the age of 18; 6.5% were between the ages of 18 and 24; 9.7% were from 25 to 44; 34.4% were from 45 to 64; and 13.1% were 65 years of age or older. The gender makeup of the town was 47.5% male and 52.5% female.

=== 2000 census ===
As of the census of 2000, there were 79 people, 26 households, and 17 families living in the town. The population density was 317.2 inhabitants per square mile (122.5/km^{2}). There were 33 housing units at an average density of 132.5 per square mile (51.2/km^{2}). The racial makeup of the town was 22.78% White, 70.89% Native American, 3.80% from other races, and 2.53% from two or more races. Hispanic or Latino of any race were 3.80% of the population.

There were 26 households, out of which 30.8% had children under the age of 18 living with them, 42.3% were married couples living together, 15.4% had a female householder with no husband present, and 34.6% were non-families. 34.6% of all households were made up of individuals, and 15.4% had someone living alone who was 65 years of age or older. The average household size was 3.04 and the average family size was 3.76.

In the town, the population was spread out, with 35.4% under the age of 18, 15.2% from 18 to 24, 12.7% from 25 to 44, 29.1% from 45 to 64, and 7.6% who were 65 years of age or older. The median age was 24 years. For every 100 females, there were 125.7 males. For every 100 females age 18 and over, there were 142.9 males.

The median income for a household in the town was $27,000, and the median income for a family was $27,000. Males had a median income of $25,417 versus $17,083 for females. The per capita income for the town was $10,310. There were 16.7% of families and 24.7% of the population living below the poverty line, including 30.8% of under eighteens and none of those over 64.

== Education ==
The school district is Andes Central School District 11-1.
