= Charles Mix County, South Dakota =

County in South Dakota, United States

- County
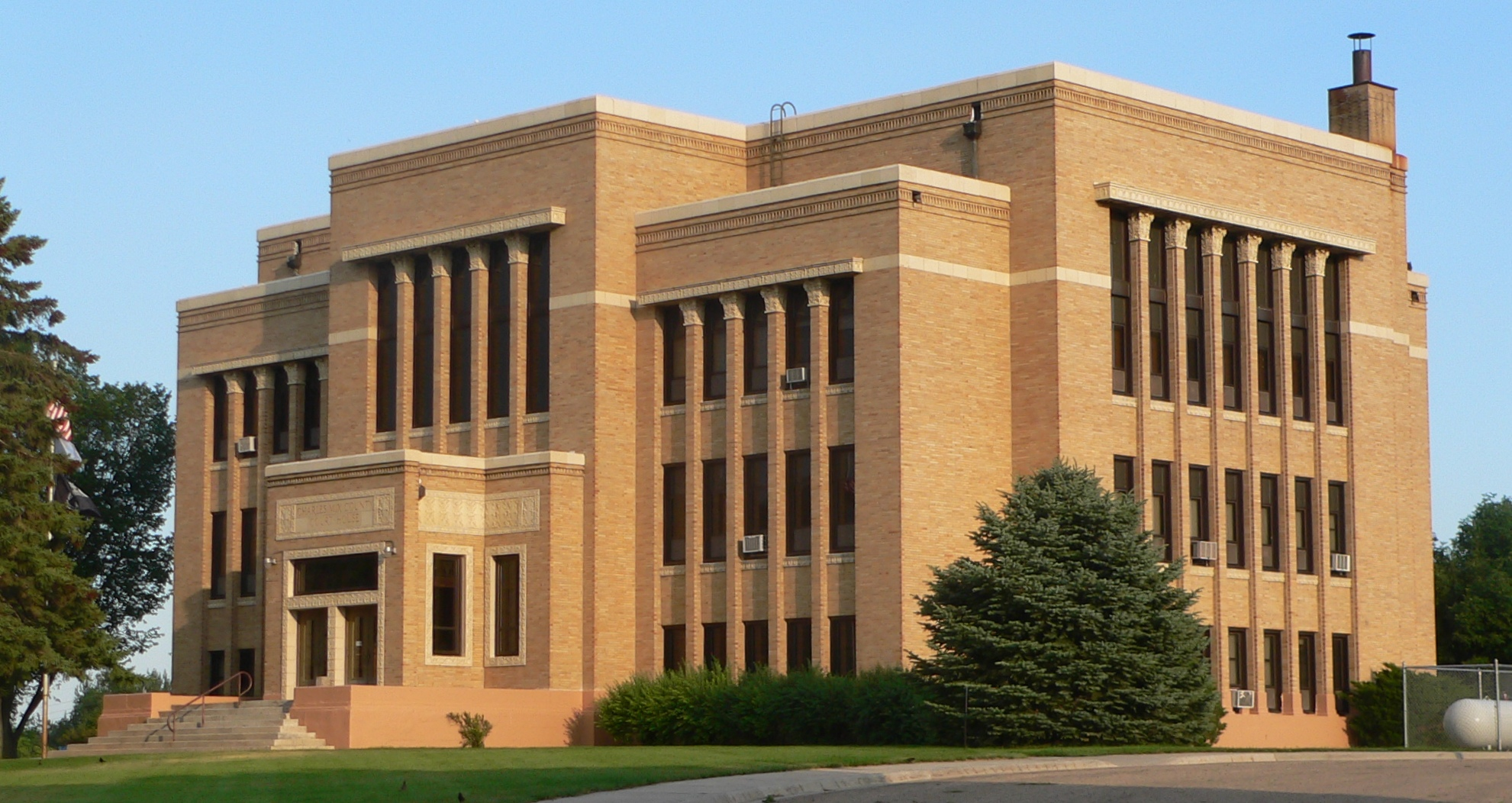
- Charles Mix County Courthouse in Lake Andes

- Location within the U.S. state of South Dakota
- Coordinates: 43°13′N 98°35′W
- Country: United States
- State: South Dakota
- Created: 1862
- Organized: 1879
- Named for: Charles Eli Mix
- Seat: Lake Andes
- Largest city: Wagner

Area
  - Total: 1,150 sq mi (3,000 km^{2})
  - Land: 1,097 sq mi (2,840 km^{2})
  - Water: 53 sq mi (140 km^{2}) 4.6%

Population (2020)
  - Total: 9,373
  - Estimate (2025): 9,303 ▼
  - Density: 8.5/sq mi (3.3/km^{2})
- Time zone: UTC−6 (Central)
  - Summer (DST): UTC−5 (CDT)
- Congressional district: At-large
- Website: charlesmixcounty.gov

Charles Mix County is a county in the U.S. state of South Dakota. As of the 2020 census, the population was 9,373. Its county seat is Lake Andes. The county was created in 1862 and organized in 1879. It was named for Charles Eli Mix, an official of the Bureau of Indian Affairs influential in signing a peace treaty with the local Lakota Indian tribes. The easternmost approximately 60% of the county comprises the Yankton Indian Reservation.

The Papineau Trading Post, whose building is now in Geddes, South Dakota, was an early county seat. Geddes tried to wrest the county seat from Wheeler in 1900, 1904, and 1908. The Charles Mix County Courthouse in Lake Andes was built in 1918.

== Geography ==
Charles Mix County lies on the south line of South Dakota. Its south boundary line abuts the north boundary line of the state of Nebraska (across the Missouri River, which flows southeastward along the county's south line). A smaller drainage flows south-southwesterly to the river along the east county line, separating it from Bon Homme County. The county terrain consists of rolling hills, mostly dedicated to agriculture. The terrain drops off into the river basin along the county's southwest side, but otherwise generally slopes to the southeast.

The county has a total area of 1,150 square miles (3,000 km^{2}), of which 1,097 square miles (2,840 km^{2}) is land and 53 square miles (140 km^{2}) (4.6%) is water.

=== Major highways ===
- U.S. Highway 18
- U.S. Highway 281
- South Dakota Highway 44
- South Dakota Highway 45
- South Dakota Highway 46
- South Dakota Highway 50
- South Dakota Highway 1804

=== Adjacent counties ===
- Brule County – northwest
- Aurora County – north
- Douglas County – northeast
- Hutchinson County – northeast
- Bon Homme County – east
- Knox County, Nebraska – southeast
- Boyd County, Nebraska – southwest
- Gregory County – west

=== Protected areas ===
- Academy Lake State Game Production Area
- Bovee Lake State Game Production Area
- Central Charles Mix State Game Production Area
- Central Platte State Game Production Area
- Dante Lake State Game Production Area
- Fuchs Waterfowl Production Area
- Gray Area State Game Production Area
- Lake Andes National Wildlife Refuge
- Lake Andes State Game Production Area
- Lake George State Game Production Area
- Missouri National Recreational River (part)
- North Point State Recreation Area
- North Wheeler State Game Production Area
- North Wheeler State Recreation Area
- Paulson State Game Production Area
- Pease Creek State Recreation Area
- Platte Creek State Recreation Area
- Raysby Waterfowl Production Area
- Red Lake State Game Production Area
- Sherman Waterfowl Production Area
- Snake Creek State Recreation Area
- Spillway State Lakeside Use Area
- Trout Waterfowl Production Area
- Tucek Waterfowl Production Area
- Turgeon State Game Production Area
- Van Zee Waterfowl Production Area
- Vanderpol Waterfowl Production Area
- West Platte State Game Production Area
- White Swan State Game Production Area
- White Swan State Lakeside Use Area
- Williamson state Game Production Area

=== Major lakes ===
- Academy Lake
- Carroll Lake
- Lake Francis Case (part)
- Goose Lake
- Lake Andes
- Lake Platte
- White Lake

== Demographics ==
Historical population
Census	Pop.	Note	%±
1870	152		—
1880	407		167.8%
1890	4,178		926.5%
1900	8,498		103.4%
1910	14,899		75.3%
1920	16,256		9.1%
1930	16,703		2.7%
1940	13,449		−19.5%
1950	15,558		15.7%
1960	11,785		−24.3%
1970	9,994		−15.2%
1980	9,680		−3.1%
1990	9,131		−5.7%
2000	9,350		2.4%
2010	9,129		−2.4%
2020	9,373		2.7%
2025 (est.)	9,303	▼	−0.7%
U.S. Decennial Census

=== 2020 census ===
As of the 2020 census, there were 9,373 people, 3,050 households, and 2,019 families residing in the county, and the population density was 8.5 inhabitants per square mile (3.3/km^{2}).

Of the residents, 28.7% were under the age of 18 and 18.2% were 65 years of age or older; the median age was 36.9 years. For every 100 females there were 99.9 males, and for every 100 females age 18 and over there were 98.8 males.

The racial makeup of the county was 61.4% White, 0.2% Black or African American, 33.1% American Indian and Alaska Native, 0.3% Asian, 0.5% from some other race, and 4.4% from two or more races. Hispanic or Latino residents of any race comprised 2.4% of the population.

There were 3,050 households in the county, of which 31.6% had children under the age of 18 living with them and 24.4% had a female householder with no spouse or partner present. About 30.0% of all households were made up of individuals and 15.2% had someone living alone who was 65 years of age or older.

There were 3,625 housing units, of which 15.9% were vacant. Among occupied housing units, 71.1% were owner-occupied and 28.9% were renter-occupied. The homeowner vacancy rate was 1.7% and the rental vacancy rate was 7.3%.

=== 2010 census ===
As of the 2010 census, there were 9,129 people, 3,249 households, and 2,222 families in the county. The population density was 8.3 inhabitants per square mile (3.2/km^{2}). There were 3,849 housing units at an average density of 3.5 per square mile (1.4/km^{2}). The racial makeup of the county was 65.0% white, 31.7% American Indian, 0.2% Asian, 0.1% black or African American, 0.3% from other races, and 2.7% from two or more races. Those of Hispanic or Latino origin made up 1.7% of the population. In terms of ancestry, 30.2% were German, 12.0% were Dutch, 11.7% were Czech, 6.8% were Norwegian, 5.1% were Irish, and 1.8% were American.

Of the 3,249 households, 33.7% had children under the age of 18 living with them, 50.0% were married couples living together, 12.9% had a female householder with no husband present, 31.6% were non-families, and 29.0% of all households were made up of individuals. The average household size was 2.63 and the average family size was 3.23. The median age was 38.2 years.

The median income for a household in the county was $35,808 and the median income for a family was $46,962. Males had a median income of $33,477 versus $25,740 for females. The per capita income for the county was $17,403. About 17.4% of families and 24.0% of the population were below the poverty line, including 32.9% of those under age 18 and 15.6% of those age 65 or over.

== Communities ==
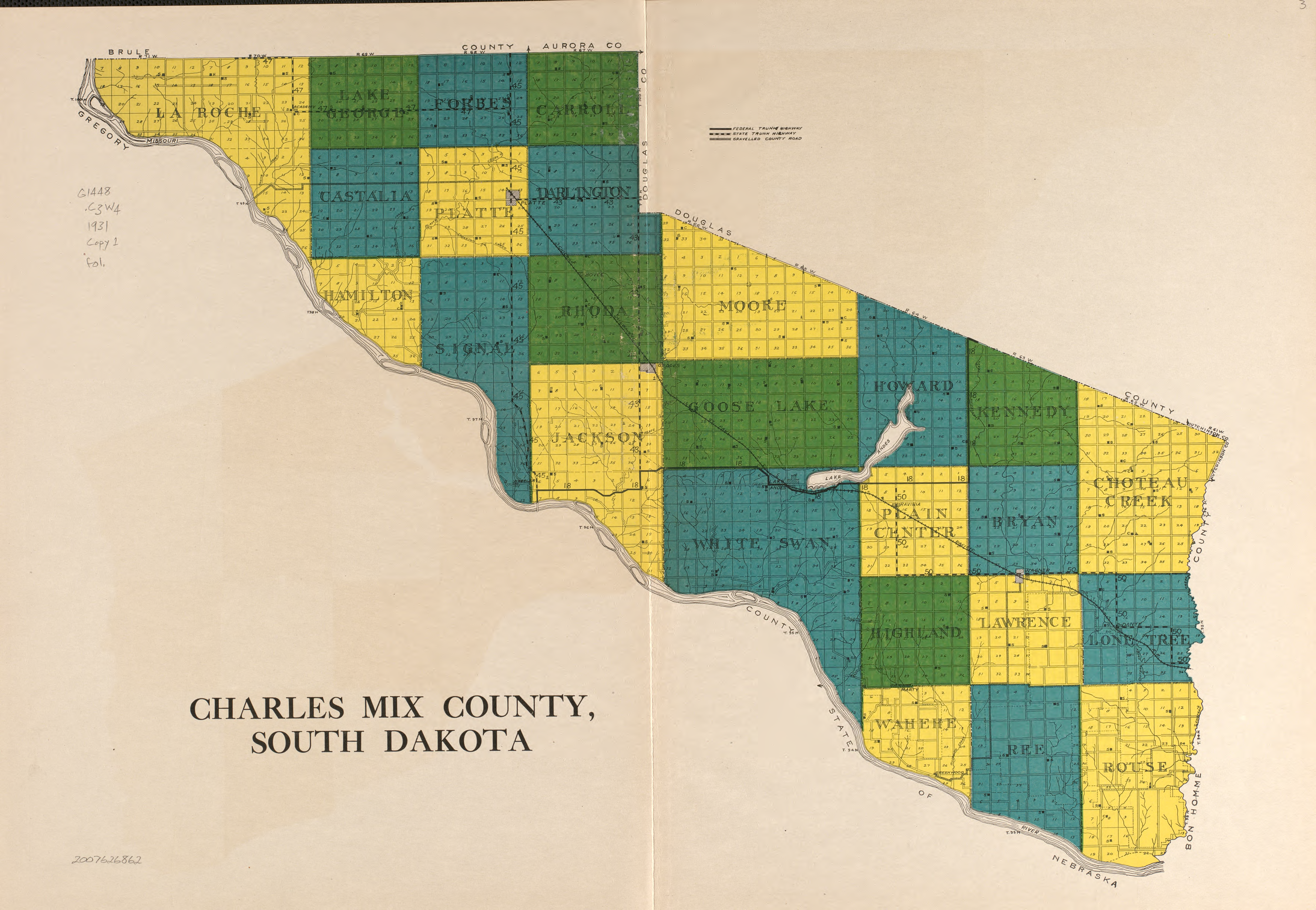
Civil townships in Charles Mix County in 1931

=== Reservation ===
- Yankton Sioux Tribe

=== Cities ===
- Geddes
- Lake Andes (county seat)
- Platte
- Wagner

=== Towns ===
- Dante
- Pickstown
- Ravinia

=== Census-designated place ===
- Clearfield Colony
- Lakeview Colony
- Marty
- Platte Colony

=== Townships ===
- Bryan
- Carroll
- Choteau Creek
- Darlington
- Forbes
- Goose Lake
- Hamilton
- Highland
- Howard
- Jackson
- Kennedy
- La Roche
- Lake George
- Lawrence
- Lone Tree
- Moore
- Platte
- Plain Center
- Rhoda
- Roe
- Rouse
- Signal
- Waheheh
- White Swan

=== Unorganized territory ===
The unorganized territory of Castalia is located in the county.

== Notable residents ==
- Ella Deloria, Yankton Dakota ethnologist
- Doug Eggers, American football player
- Faith Spotted Eagle, first Native American woman to receive an electoral college vote for President of the United States (2016).
- Jack Sully was elected sheriff in 1872.

== Politics ==
Charles Mix County, more akin to the Midwest than the Great Plains, up until recently favored the Democratic Party. It was one of only 130 counties nationwide to be won in 1972 by favorite son George McGovern, and it was only once carried by a Republican nominee between 1932 and 1976 – when Dwight D. Eisenhower swept every county in South Dakota in 1952. Donald Trump in 2016, 2020, and 2024 easily exceeded the previous best Republican performance in the county.

United States presidential election results for Charles Mix County, South Dakota
Year	Republican		Democratic		Third party(ies)	
Year	No.	%	No.	%	No.	%
1892	516	57.40%	115	12.79%	268	29.81%
1896	698	53.57%	594	45.59%	11	0.84%
1900	1,108	50.43%	1,058	48.16%	31	1.41%
1904	1,765	64.84%	823	30.24%	134	4.92%
1908	1,863	55.88%	1,391	41.72%	80	2.40%
1912	0	0.00%	1,625	45.84%	1,920	54.16%
1916	1,450	41.26%	2,011	57.23%	53	1.51%
1920	2,021	50.17%	1,305	32.40%	702	17.43%
1924	1,680	31.22%	1,306	24.27%	2,396	44.52%
1928	3,087	50.28%	3,039	49.50%	14	0.23%
1932	1,397	20.41%	5,399	78.86%	50	0.73%
1936	2,209	31.96%	4,628	66.96%	75	1.09%
1940	2,993	47.54%	3,303	52.46%	0	0.00%
1944	2,171	44.56%	2,701	55.44%	0	0.00%
1948	1,800	36.47%	3,086	62.53%	49	0.99%
1952	3,316	54.31%	2,790	45.69%	0	0.00%
1956	2,202	41.40%	3,117	58.60%	0	0.00%
1960	2,446	47.04%	2,754	52.96%	0	0.00%
1964	1,625	31.78%	3,488	68.22%	0	0.00%
1968	2,093	44.77%	2,369	50.67%	213	4.56%
1972	2,020	42.79%	2,691	57.00%	10	0.21%
1976	1,779	40.49%	2,593	59.01%	22	0.50%
1980	2,608	56.71%	1,741	37.86%	250	5.44%
1984	2,660	58.29%	1,879	41.18%	24	0.53%
1988	1,966	46.99%	2,205	52.70%	13	0.31%
1992	1,570	38.30%	1,639	39.99%	890	21.71%
1996	1,711	42.40%	1,913	47.41%	411	10.19%
2000	2,205	61.61%	1,300	36.32%	74	2.07%
2004	2,556	53.27%	2,155	44.91%	87	1.81%
2008	2,109	53.02%	1,807	45.42%	62	1.56%
2012	2,230	59.25%	1,483	39.40%	51	1.35%
2016	2,382	69.39%	935	27.24%	116	3.38%
2020	2,552	67.46%	1,177	31.11%	54	1.43%
2024	2,551	70.57%	1,000	27.66%	64	1.77%

== Education ==
School districts include:

- Armour School District 21-1
- Avon School District 04-1
- Andes Central School District 11-1
- Platte-Geddes School District 11-5
- Tripp-Delmont School District 33-5
- Wagner School District 11-4

Marty Indian School, a tribal school affiliated with the Bureau of Indian Education, is in the county.

== See also ==
- National Register of Historic Places listings in Charles Mix County, South Dakota
