= Yankton Sioux Tribe =

Federally recognized Native American tribe in South Dakota, U.S.

Yankton Sioux Tribe of the South Dakota
Dakȟota Iháŋktȟuŋwaŋ Oyáte

Total population
- 11,594 enrolled citizens

Regions with significant populations
- United States (South Dakota)

Languages
- Dakota, English

Religion
- Indigenous religion, Sun Dance, Native American Church, Christianity

Related ethnic groups
- other Eastern Dakota, Western Dakota people

Nicollet's 1843 Map of the upper Mississippi basin was used to draft the Treaty Traverse des Sioux as it identified tribal lands. Drafters of the treaty assumed the Big Sioux River was a geographical boundary for the Yankton when they could walk across it to their quarry at Pipestone.

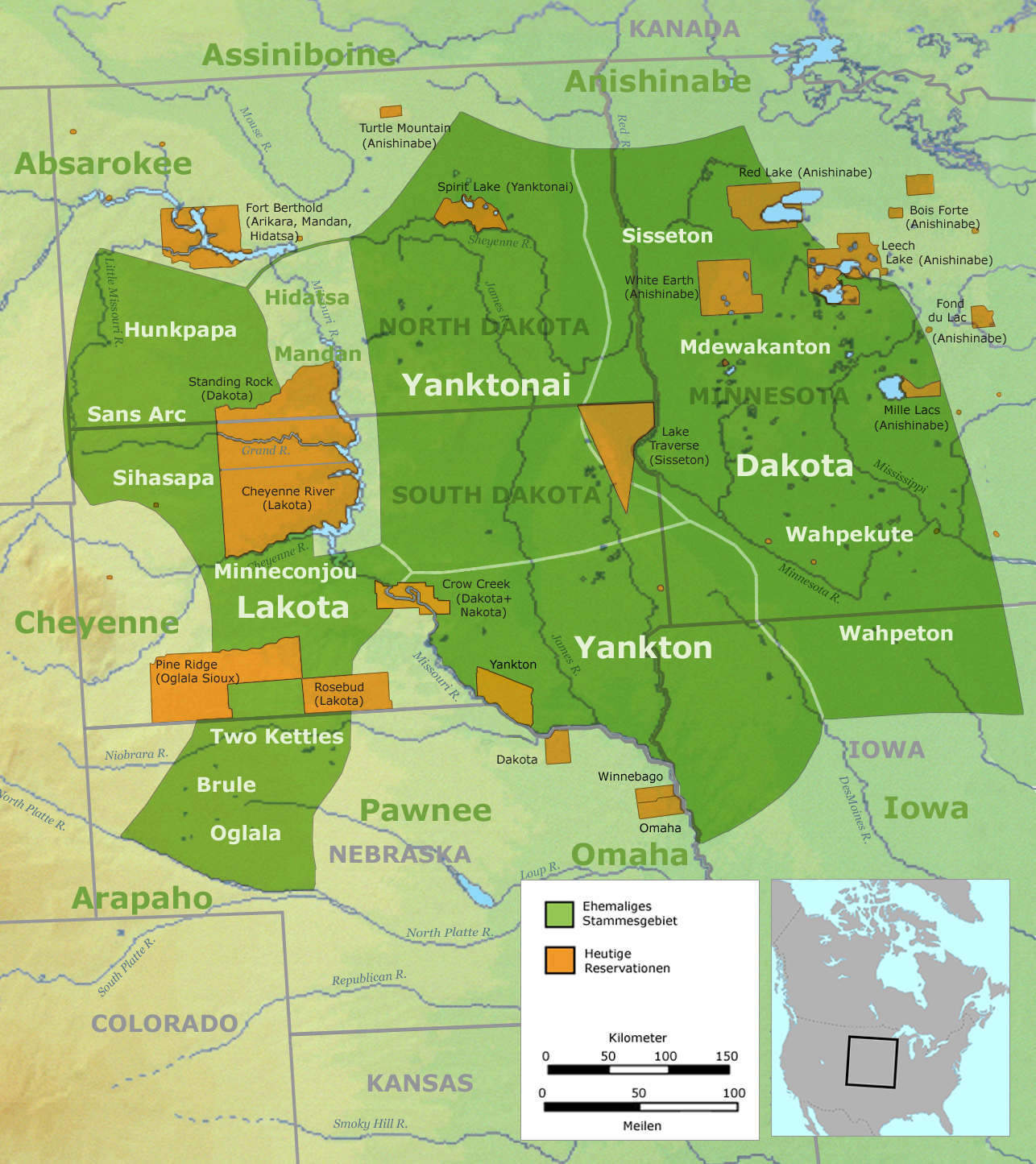
German settlers recorded Yankton land extended east into Minnesota to the Jeffers Petroglyphs

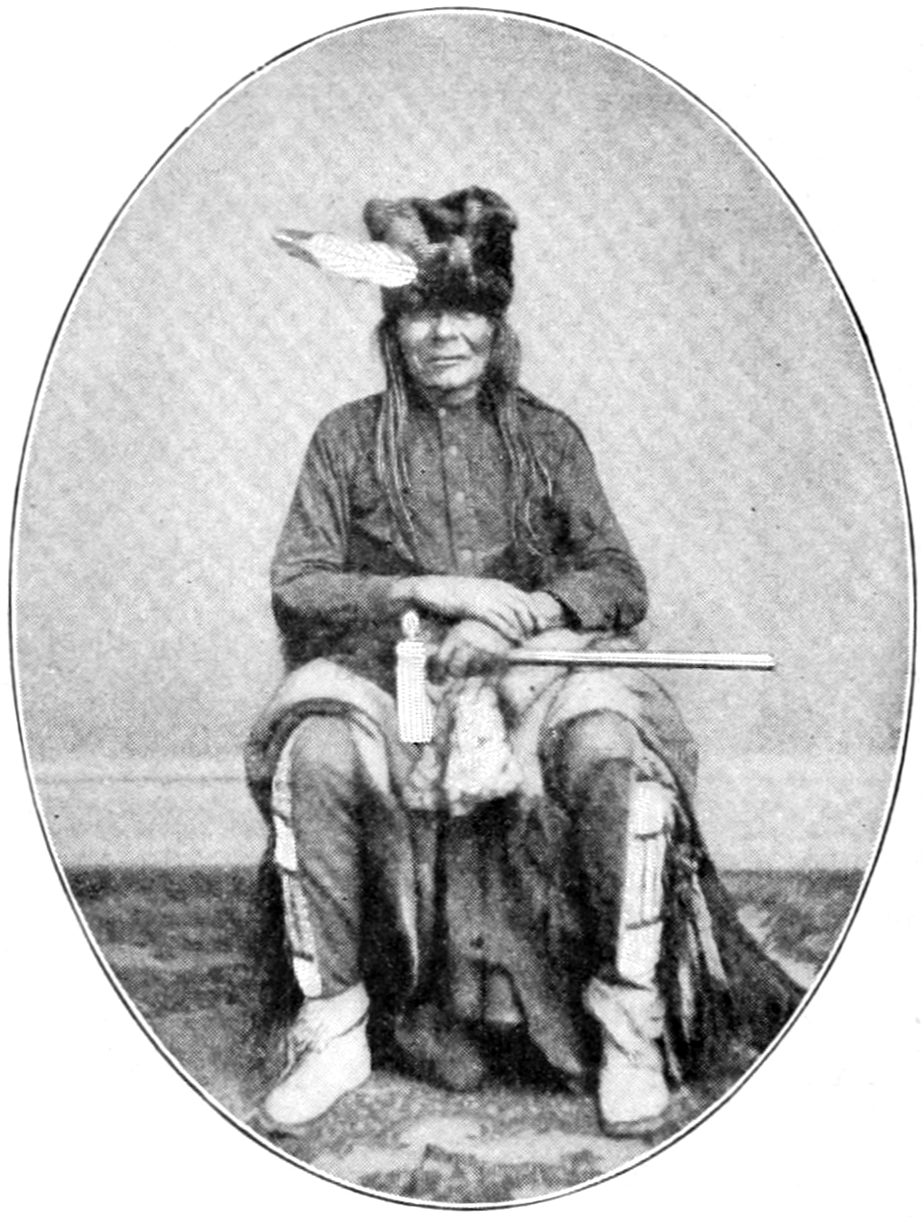
Yankton Sioux chief Struck by the Ree insisted on making the Pipestone quarry a treaty issue with the United States in 1858. The Yankton refer to the Arikara as the "Ree"

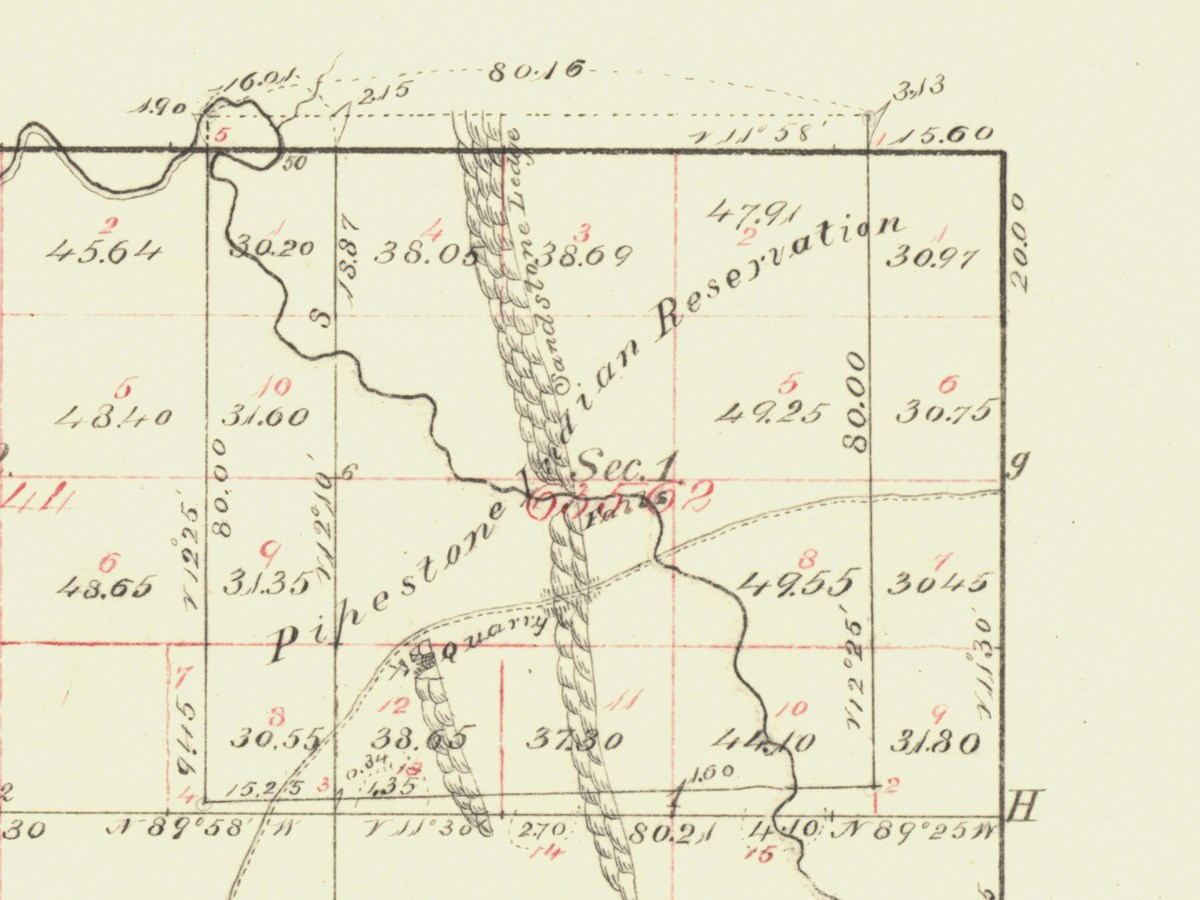
1872 Plat of Yankton Sioux Pipestone Reservation held by the National Park Service

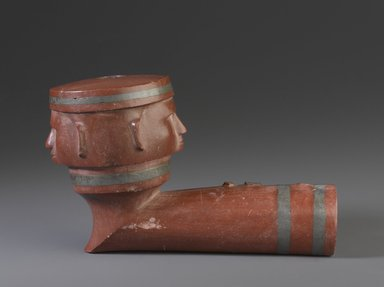
Inlaid Pipe Bowl collected at Fort Snelling, c. 1833–1836, carved from stone from the Yankton quarry.

The Yankton Sioux Tribe is a federally recognized tribe located along the Missouri River in the southeastern part of South Dakota. Their Dakota name is Iháŋktȟuŋwaŋ Oyáte of the mid-central Dakota people. Their Dakota name translates as "People of the End Village", which refers to the time the tribe lived at the end of Spirit Lake just north of Mille Lacs Lake.

Historically, the tribe is the protector of the sacred Pipestone Quarry for the Očéti Šakówiŋ (Dakota).

== Government ==
The tribe's headquarters are in Wagner, South Dakota, and it is governed by a democratically elected non-Indian Reorganization Act tribal council. Its original constitution was ratified in 1891.

It is the only Dakota/Lakota tribe in South Dakota that did not agree to comply with the Indian Reorganization Act and retains its traditional government.

Officially, the Yankton Sioux Tribe is called "Ihanktonwan Dakota Oyate" in the local dialect. The Yankton Sioux, or Dakota people, adopted a unique tribal symbol on September 24, 1975. With minor alterations this symbol serves as seal, logo and flag.

Crossing the yellow portions of the flag approximately one-third from the bottom is an undulating red line. This symbolizes a "prayer" to bind the home in love and safety. Red was chosen by designer Gladys L. Moore, a Yankton Sioux from Union Lake (Ibid), Michigan, because it is a symbol of life. The color red was painted around the lower parts of tepees to indicate that those that visited would be fed or that that particular tepee was one of several in which a feast was to be held.

== Reservation ==
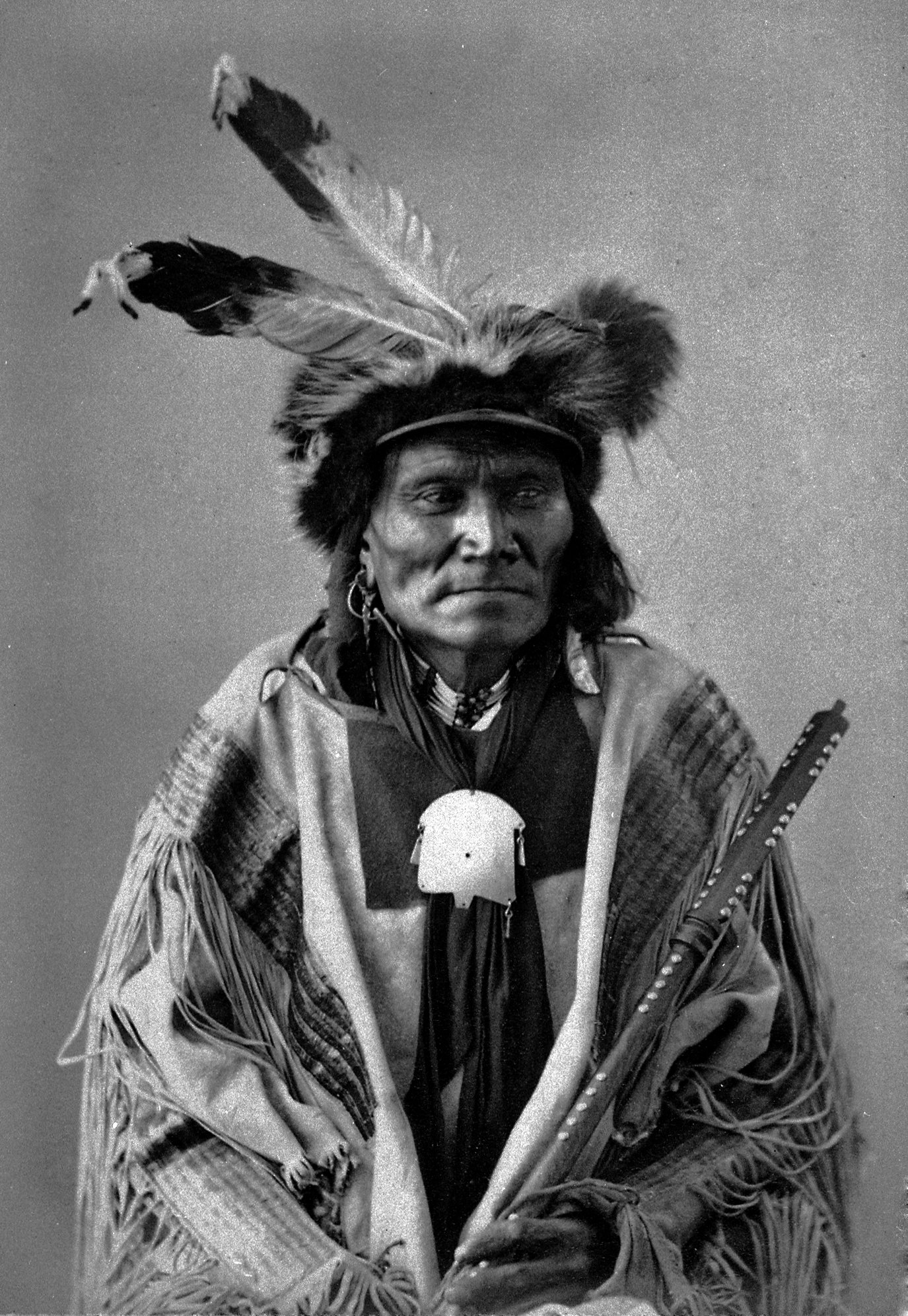
Long Fox, To-Can-Has-Ka, Tachana, Yankton Sioux, 1872

The tribe's reservation is the Yankton Indian Reservation, established in 1853 in Charles Mix County, South Dakota. The tribe has a land base of 36,741 acres (148.69 km^{2}). Most of the tribe moved onto the reservation in the 1860s.

The Yankton treaty of 1858 created a Yankton Sioux Reservation one mile square at the Pipestone quarry in Minnesota. The Yankton Dakota are credited with protecting the quarry from white settlement and the creation of the Pipestone National Monument that now exists where the reservation once was.

== Economic development ==
The tribe owns and operates the Fort Randall Casino and Hotel in Pickstown, South Dakota, and Lucky Lounge and Four Directions Restaurant.

Other major employers include Indian Health Services, the tribe itself, Bureau of Indian Affairs, and Marty Indian School.

The tribe maintains a free-ranging bison herd.

== Treaties and land cession ==
The first treaty the United States signed with the Yankton people took place at Portage des Sioux on July 18, 1815. The second took place in Washington DC, on October 21, 1837, and is recorded as Indian Treaty 226. By the late 1850s, pressure to open up what is now southeastern South Dakota to white settlement had become very strong. Struck-by-the-Ree and several other headmen journeyed to Washington, D.C., in late 1857 to negotiate a treaty with the federal government. Also in 1857 the Yankton secured the release of two captives taken by Ink-pa-du-tah's band at the Spirit Lake Massacre. The Sisseton and Wahpeton tribes signed the Treaty of Traverse des Sioux, ceding lands west to the Big Sioux River. The Yankton Sioux claimed the land east of the Big Sioux River past the Pipestone quarry. Both the Yankton and Yanktonai felt they Santee Sioux were collecting annuities that should have been theirs with the Yanktonai further claimed the Yankton tribe had sold Yanktonai land also. For more than three and a half months the tribal leaders worked on the terms of a treaty of l and cession. The Yankton Treaty of Washington was signed April 19, 1858, with article 8 granting the Yankton a one-mile square reservation protecting the pipestone quarry. The treaty made Minnesota Territory free and clear to become a State in May 1858. Returning from Washington, Padaniapapi (Struck-by-The-Ree) told his people, "The white men are coming in like maggots. It is useless to resist them. They are many more than we are. We could not hope to stop them. Many of our brave warriors would be killed, our women and children left in sorrow, and still we would not stop them. We must accept it, get the best terms we can get and try to adopt their ways." Despite having a treaty for the reservation at Pipestone white settlers over and over ignored it and even submitted land claims for some of it. In the 1880s, a ten-man cavalry troop from Fort Randall was sent to evict the squatters, but the problem continued and with little outside support, the Yankton people went to the U.S. Supreme Court in 1928 to protect their rights and land. A hundred acres of the reservation were taken for the construction of the Pipestone Indian school in 1894. Native American children were sent to the school until its closure in the 1950s. The Supreme Court ruled that when the Government took that land for the school it had actually taken the entire reservation and that the tribe should be compensated. At that point, the Pipestone reservation was on its path to becoming a National Monument.

For about 11.5 million acres (47,000 km^{2}), a payment of approximately $1.6 million ($46.3 million in modern dollars) in annuities was to be paid over the next 50 years. Specific provisions of the treaty called for educating the tribe to develop skills in agriculture, industrial arts and homemaking. This provided the purpose for construction of the school. The treaty stipulated that the tribe relocate to a 475,000-acre (192,000 ha) reservation on the north side of the Missouri River in what is now Charles Mix County, named for the commissioner who signed the 1858 treaty for the federal government.) The Senate ratified the treaty on February 16, 1859, and President James Buchanan authorized it ten days later. On July 10, 1859, the Yankton Sioux vacated the ceded lands and moved onto the newly created reservation. After then there are three cessions on record: cessions 410, 411, and 412, all reducing the size of the reservation.

In the 1990s, a dispute between the tribe and the state led to the reservation's reduction to its current size. The state had issued a permit for a new landfill to be built on land the tribe argued was on the reservation, based on its original boundaries, and thus the landfill had to meet federal standards, which it did not. It sued the state in federal court to block the project. In its defense, the state pointed to an 1894 act of Congress that had modified the 1858 treaty in the wake of the Dawes Act seven years earlier, accepting an agreement with the Yankton Sioux to sell to the federal government all the lands not allotted to citizens of the tribe. In 1998, the case reached the Supreme Court, which unanimously held for the state, finding no evidence that Congress had intended to retain the reservation boundaries in existence as of 1894. In 2011, after years of litigation, the Supreme Court ruled in favor of the Yankton people by determining that "the Yankton Reservation had not been disestablished".

== Transportation system ==
YST Transit
- Headquarters: Wagner, South Dakota
- Locale: Charles Mix County, SD
- Service type: bus service, paratransit
- Stops: 17
- Fleet: 3 (2020)
- Website: www.yanktonsiouxtribe.net/yst-transit

YST Transit, short for Yankton Sioux Tribe Transit, and otherwise known as Ihanktowan Transit is the provider of mass transportation on the reservation. Nine scheduled bus services operate Monday through Friday between Marty, Ravinia, Wagner, the Fort Randall Casino and Lake Andes. There are a total of 17 stops, with three in Marty, one in Ravinia, seven in Wagner, one at the Fort Randall Casino and five in Lake Andes, while fares are set at $1. Demand-response service is also provided.

=== Fixed route ridership ===
The ridership and service statistics shown here are of fixed route services only and do not include demand response.

	Ridership	Change
2014	25,125	n/a
2015	12,055	▼52.02%
2016	12,541	▲4.03%
2017	12,840	▲2.38%
2018	15,040	▲17.13%
2020	7,319	n/a

== History ==
=== 19th century ===
According to local legend, when Meriwether Lewis learned that a boy had been born near the expedition's encampment in southeastern South Dakota, he sent for the newborn child and wrapped him in an American flag during the council at Calumet Bluff in late August 1804. Lewis declared the baby an American. This boy grew up to become a headman (chief) of the Ihanktonwan Dakota (Yankton Sioux), known as Struck By-the-Ree. However, the journals of the expedition make no mention of this incident.

In December 1862 Little Crow met for a month with the leaders of the Yankton and Yanktonai. Chief Struck By-the-Ree refused to join the Mdewakanton and sent warriors to protect Fort Pierre when Little Crow talked of attacking it. When Struck By-the-Ree learned that some of Sleepy eye's band and White Lodge's band had captives on Yankton land he paid their encampment a visit. He offered to trade a horse for each prisoner, two women, and five children, and was scoffed at. The chief informed his visitors they were on Yankton land and would be attacked if they refused his generosity. One source says he was given the prisoners. However, warriors of the Two Kettle Lakota secured their release.

In the spring of 1863, a member of Little Crow's band, Red Cloud, was captured. He reported that Little Crow had wanted to attack Fort Pierre, but had not because the Yankton were providing the fort security.

== Notable tribal citizens ==
Yankton Sioux Congressional Gold Medal
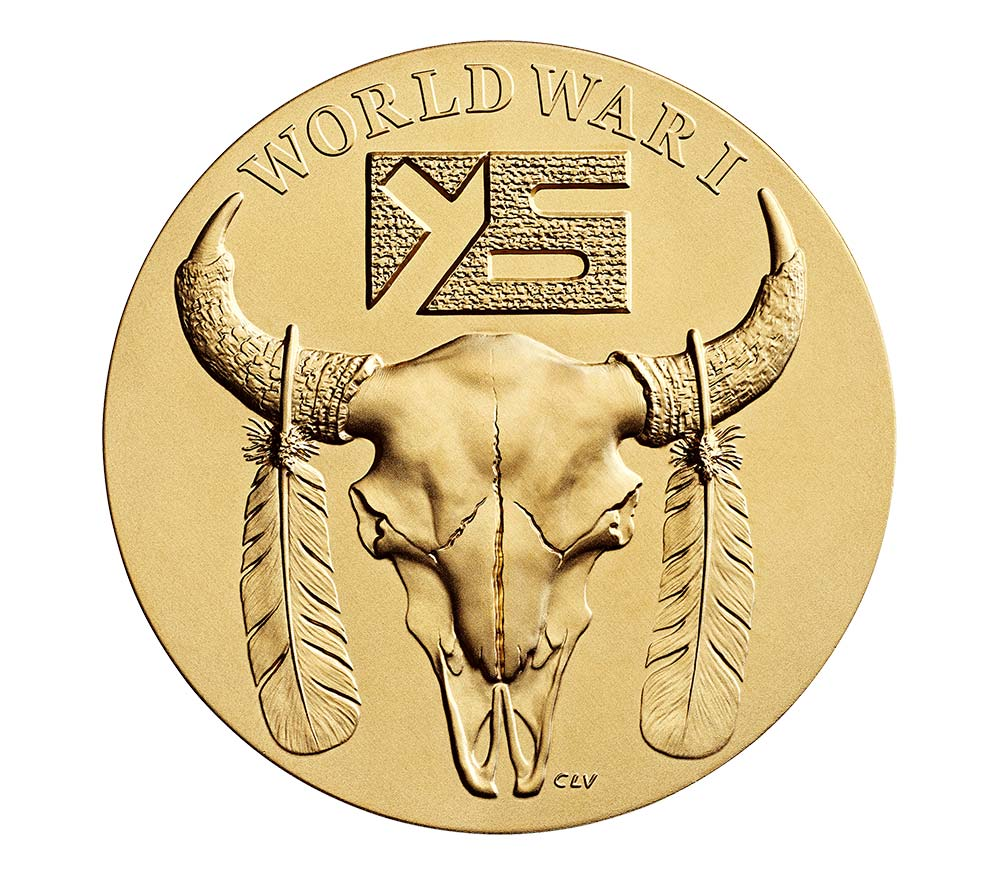
This medal is one in a series issued by Congress to recognize the military service of Native Nations to the United States
- Indigenous (band)
- Ella Cara Deloria (linguist, ethnologist)
- Jacqueline Keeler (writer, activist)
- Phil Lane, Jr. (Educator, Humanitarian, International Indigenous Leader)
- Maria Pearson (activist, "Rosa Parks of NAGPRA")
- Faith Spotted Eagle (elder, activist, and first Native American to receive an electoral vote for president)
- Struck by the Ree (Chief, Headman, Treaty Signer)
- Zitkala-Sa (writer, editor, musician, teacher and political activist)
- Heather Keeler (politician)

== Gallery ==
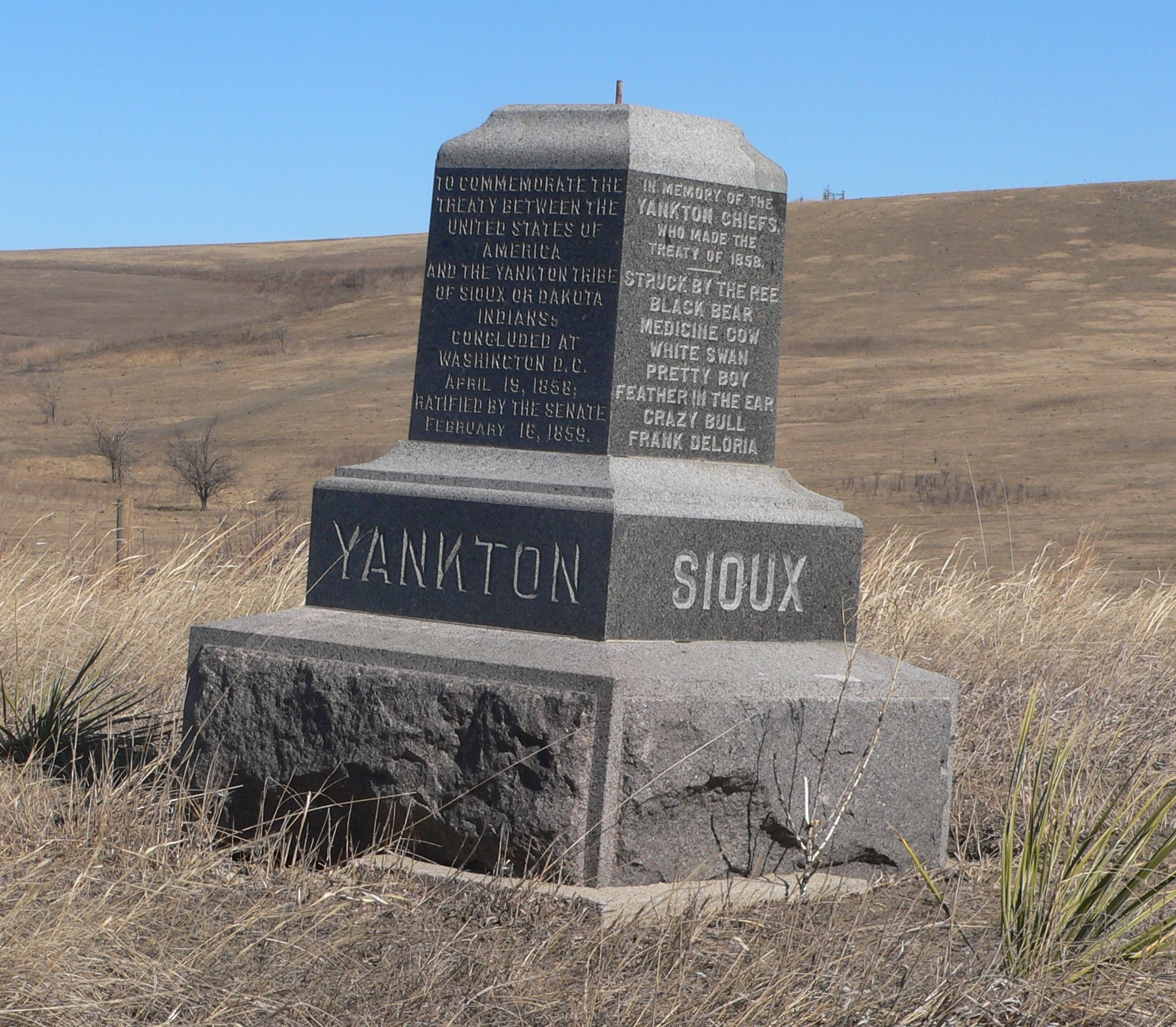
1858 Yankton Treaty monument in disrepair

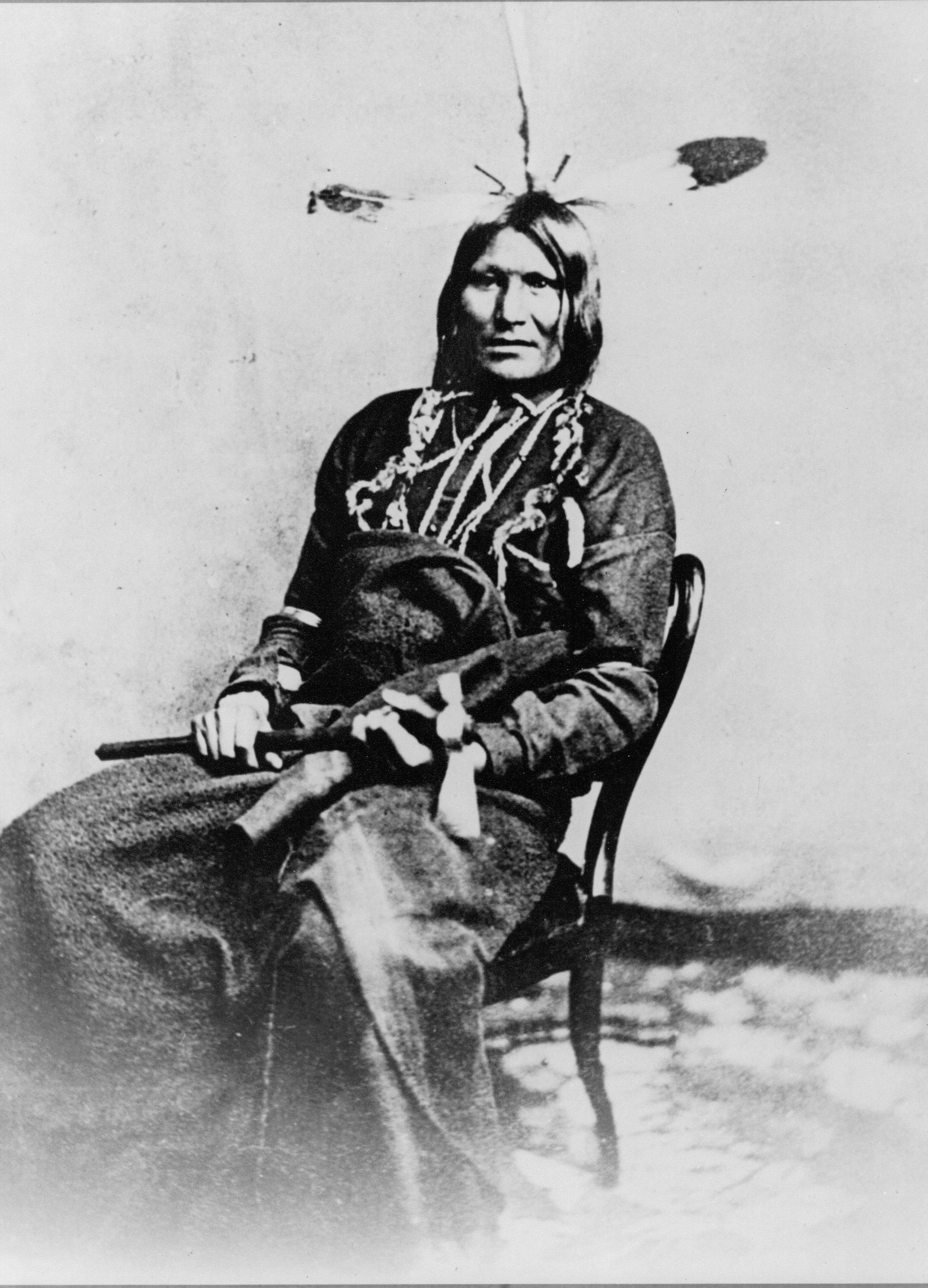
Running Bull - Yankton Sioux Chief signed 1858 treaty

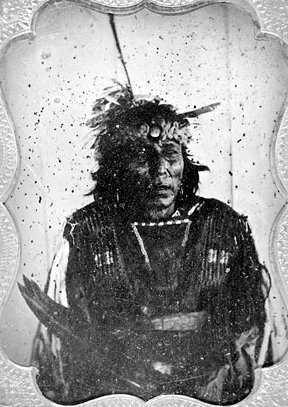
Smutty Bear in 1857. He also signed the 1858 Yankton treaty.
