= Platte, South Dakota =

- City
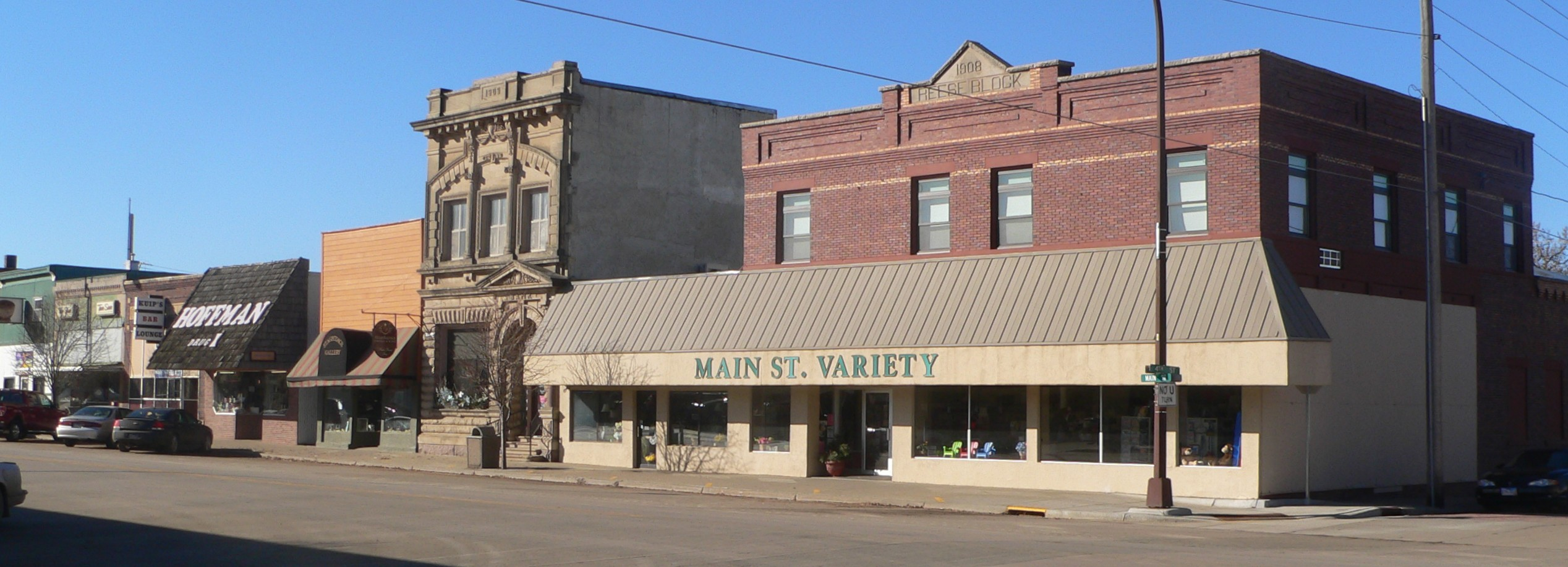
- Main Street in Platte, February 2016

- Location in Charles Mix County and the state of South Dakota
- Coordinates: 43°23′13″N 98°50′36″W
- Country: United States
- State: South Dakota
- County: Charles Mix
- Incorporated: 1907

Area
  - Total: 1.05 sq mi (2.73 km^{2})
  - Land: 1.05 sq mi (2.73 km^{2})
  - Water: 0 sq mi (0.00 km^{2})
- Elevation: 1,601 ft (488 m)

Population (2020)
  - Total: 1,296
  - Density: 1,231.3/sq mi (475.39/km^{2})
- Time zone: UTC−6 (Central (CST))
  - Summer (DST): UTC−5 (CDT)
- ZIP code: 57369
- Area code: 605
- FIPS code: 46-50260
- GNIS feature ID: 1267535
- Website: http://www.plattesd.org/

Platte is a city in Charles Mix County, South Dakota, United States. The community is named after the Platte Creek, a tributary of the Missouri River reservoir Lake Francis Case. Platte is located 15 miles east of Lake Francis Case on the Missouri River.

== History ==
Lewis and Clark were told to watch for ‘burning bluffs’ in the area. Settlement began in the early 1880s. A fur trader named Bernard Pratte once lived at the mouth of what was then known as the ‘Fish Creek’. Pratte's last name was mistakenly transcribed as Platte on an early map of the creek and the spelling error stuck. The town that would become Platte was named after the creek.

For 12 years, Charles Mix County was the only county in the state of South Dakota without a railroad. Platte originated in the summer of 1900 after it was selected as the terminus for a Chicago, Milwaukee, and St. Paul railroad branch line from Yankton. The railroad arrived in October and buildings were moved from the nearby settlements of Castalia, Old Platte, and Edgerton. The Platte Enterprise newspaper was founded in 1900 and is still published today.

The Great Depression and drought of the 1930s led to unemployment and out-migration in the area. A dam was constructed on the Platte Creek during this time. The area became a place for picnics and recreation. In 1956, the Fort Randall Dam was completed creating Lake Francis Case. In 1966, the Platte-Winner Bridge was completed over the lake giving travelers a new route to and from the Black Hills.

== Geography ==
According to the United States Census Bureau, the city has a total area of 1.02 square miles (2.64 km^{2}), all land.

The community is situated at the junction of Routes 44 and 45.

=== Climate ===
This climatic region is typified by large seasonal temperature differences, with warm to hot (and often humid) summers and cold (sometimes severely cold) winters. According to the Köppen Climate Classification system, Platte has a humid continental climate, abbreviated "Dfa" on climate maps.

Climate data for Platte, South Dakota
Month	Jan	Feb	Mar	Apr	May	Jun	Jul	Aug	Sep	Oct	Nov	Dec	Year
Mean daily maximum °F (°C)	31 (−1)	35 (2)	46 (8)	60 (16)	72 (22)	81 (27)	89 (32)	87 (31)	78 (26)	65 (18)	47 (8)	34 (1)	60 (16)
Mean daily minimum °F (°C)	8 (−13)	12 (−11)	22 (−6)	35 (2)	45 (7)	56 (13)	61 (16)	59 (15)	49 (9)	37 (3)	24 (−4)	13 (−11)	35 (2)
Average precipitation inches (mm)	0.5 (13)	0.6 (15)	1.3 (33)	2.5 (64)	3.3 (84)	3.8 (97)	2.7 (69)	2.5 (64)	1.9 (48)	1.5 (38)	0.8 (20)	0.5 (13)	21.8 (550)
Source: Weatherbase

== Demographics ==
Historical population
Census	Pop.	Note	%±
1910	1,115		—
1920	1,242		11.4%
1930	1,207		−2.8%
1940	1,017		−15.7%
1950	1,069		5.1%
1960	1,167		9.2%
1970	1,351		15.8%
1980	1,334		−1.3%
1990	1,311		−1.7%
2000	1,367		4.3%
2010	1,230		−10.0%
2020	1,296		5.4%
U.S. Decennial Census

=== 2020 census ===
As of the 2020 census, Platte had a population of 1,296. The median age was 42.7 years. 24.4% of residents were under the age of 18 and 26.5% of residents were 65 years of age or older. For every 100 females there were 98.2 males, and for every 100 females age 18 and over there were 95.2 males age 18 and over.

0.0% of residents lived in urban areas, while 100.0% lived in rural areas.

There were 539 households in Platte, of which 24.9% had children under the age of 18 living in them. Of all households, 54.0% were married-couple households, 19.5% were households with a male householder and no spouse or partner present, and 24.1% were households with a female householder and no spouse or partner present. About 37.8% of all households were made up of individuals and 20.8% had someone living alone who was 65 years of age or older.

There were 610 housing units, of which 11.6% were vacant. The homeowner vacancy rate was 2.0% and the rental vacancy rate was 9.5%.

Racial composition as of the 2020 census
Race	Number	Percent
White	1,208	93.2%
Black or African American	3	0.2%
American Indian and Alaska Native	11	0.8%
Asian	5	0.4%
Native Hawaiian and Other Pacific Islander	0	0.0%
Some other race	16	1.2%
Two or more races	53	4.1%
Hispanic or Latino (of any race)	31	2.4%

=== 2010 census ===
As of the census of 2010, there were 1,230 people, 548 households, and 337 families living in the city. The population density was 1,205.9 inhabitants per square mile (465.6/km^{2}). There were 625 housing units at an average density of 612.7 units per square mile (236.6 units/km^{2}). The racial makeup of the city was 98.5% White, 0.6% Native American, and 0.9% from two or more races. Hispanic or Latino of any race were 0.1% of the population.

There were 548 households, of which 23.0% had children under the age of 18 living with them, 56.6% were married couples living together, 3.5% had a female householder with no husband present, 1.5% had a male householder with no wife present, and 38.5% were non-families. 35.9% of all households were made up of individuals, and 19.5% had someone living alone who was 65 years of age or older. The average household size was 2.16 and the average family size was 2.80.

The median age in the city was 48.6 years. 20.4% of residents were under the age of 18; 6.3% were between the ages of 18 and 24; 19% were from 25 to 44; 25.9% were from 45 to 64; and 28.4% were 65 years of age or older. The gender makeup of the city was 48.4% male and 51.6% female.

=== 2000 census ===
As of the census of 2000, there were 1,367 people, 587 households, and 363 families living in the city. The population density was 1,364.4 inhabitants per square mile (526.8/km^{2}). There were 637 housing units at an average density of 635.8 units per square mile (245.5 units/km^{2}). The racial makeup of the city was 99.20% White, 0.29% Native American, 0.15% Asian, 0.07% from other races, and 0.29% from two or more races. Hispanic or Latino of any race were 0.66% of the population.

There were 587 households, out of which 26.6% had children under the age of 18 living with them, 56.6% were married couples living together, 3.6% had a female householder with no husband present, and 38.0% were non-families. 37.5% of all households were made up of individuals, and 23.3% had someone living alone who was 65 years of age or older. The average household size was 2.22 and the average family size was 2.95.

In the city, the population was spread out, with 24.2% under the age of 18, 4.8% from 18 to 24, 21.1% from 25 to 44, 20.0% from 45 to 64, and 29.8% who were 65 years of age or older. The median age was 45 years. For every 100 females, there were 89.6 males. For every 100 females age 18 and over, there were 84.3 males.

As of 2000 the median income for a household in the city was $30,369, and the median income for a family was $38,750. Males had a median income of $27,283 versus $19,464 for females. The per capita income for the city was $15,962. About 3.0% of families and 5.4% of the population were below the poverty line, including 3.8% of those under age 18 and 12.0% of those age 65 or over.

== Education ==
The school district is Platte-Geddes School District 11-5.

== See also ==
- List of cities in South Dakota
