= Marty Indian School =

Tribal boarding school in Marty, South Dakota

Coordinates: 42.9942°N 98.4248°W

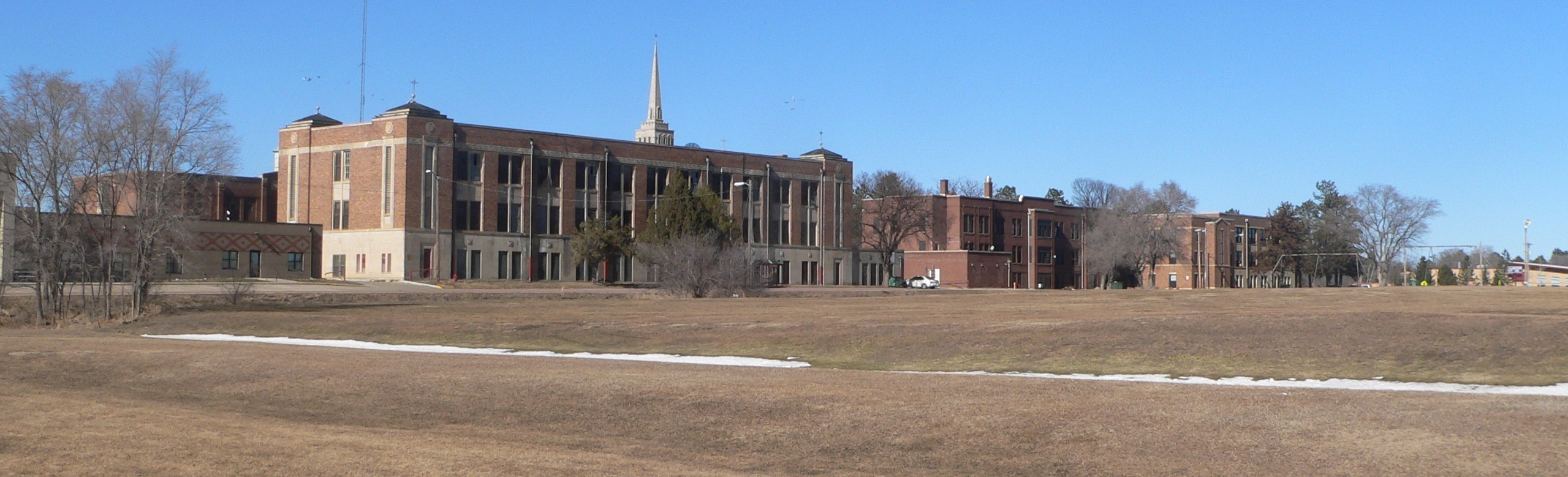
Marty Indian School

Marty Indian School is a K-12 tribal boarding school in Marty, South Dakota. It is affiliated with the Bureau of Indian Education (BIE). It is on the Yankton Indian Reservation. The Yankton Sioux Tribe owns the facilities and directly manages the school.

It takes boarding students for grades 7–12. It has separate dormitories for boys and girls.

== History ==
In 1987 a former executive assistant at the school, Lewis B. Dillon, pleaded guilty to embezzling money from the school. Laurel Vermillion served as the principal in the 1990s.

Timothy Stathis became the principal in May 2017. Stathis had implemented a bonus program to pay teachers higher pay if their students had higher scores. According to Stathis this caused opposition against him. A sit-in against his policies occurred on November 15, 2017. The school gave Stathis notice of his firing on December 1, 2017. His contract was scheduled to end in June 2018.

Stathis, who later began work in California, filed a lawsuit against the school for wrongful removal in the South Dakota courts. Bruce Anderson, the judge of the first circuit court, ruled the case should be dismissed as Native American tribes are sovereign from the state government, Stathis filed an appeal to the South Dakota Supreme Court with his lawyer arguing that tribal sovereignty should be done away with. The South Dakota Supreme Court also ruled that tribes had sovereignty. Stathis filed a new lawsuit in federal court.
