= Struck by the Ree =

Yankton Dakota chief (d. 1888)

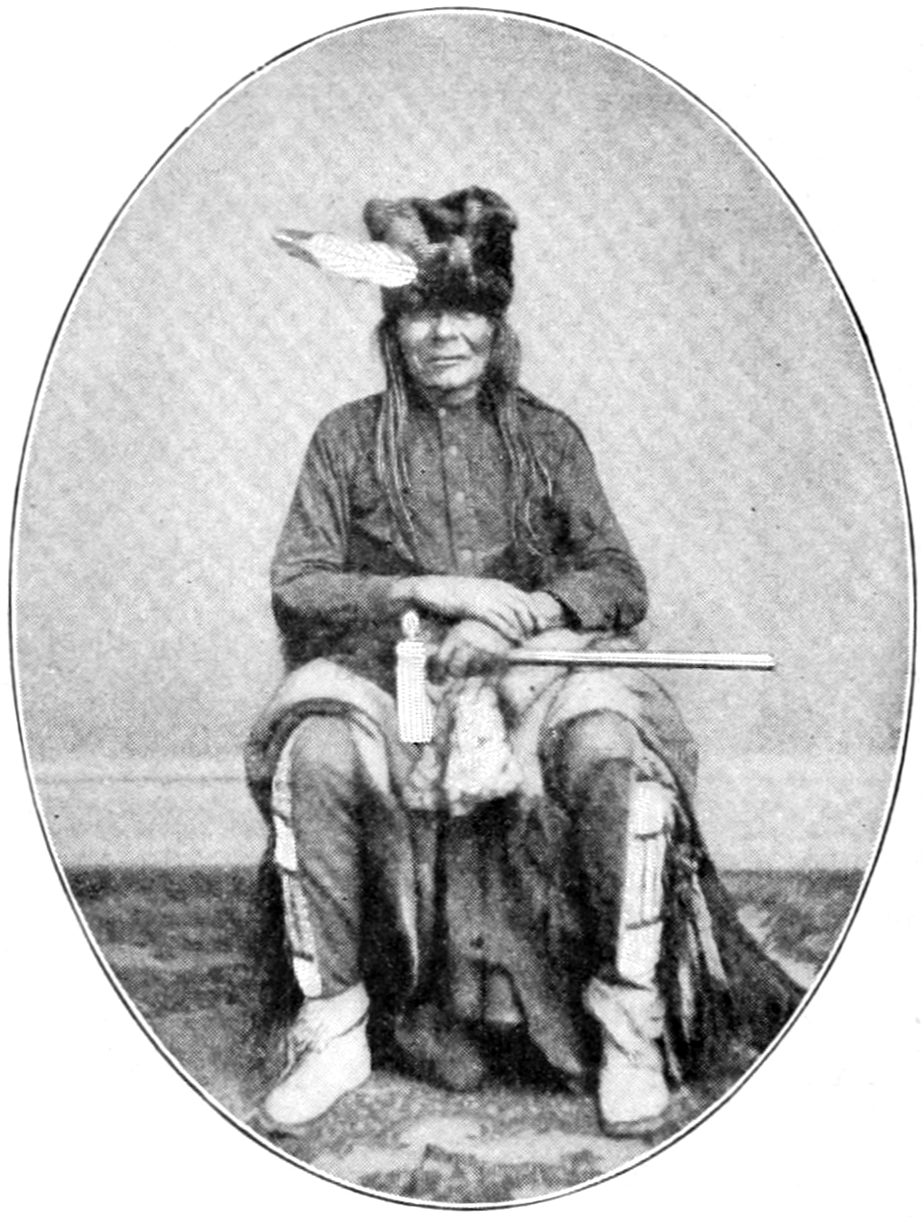
Struck by the Ree

Struck by the Ree, also known as Strikes the Ree and alternatively Palaneapape, Padani Apapi and Pa-Da-Ni-A-Ha-Hi in the Dakota language (c. 1804–1888), was a chief of the Native American Yankton Dakota tribe.

== Birth ==
In 1804, a great pow-wow was held for the Lewis and Clark Expedition at Calumet Bluff/Gavins Point (near present-day Yankton, South Dakota) that included the "Shunka" sacred dog feast ceremony. During the festivities, the explorers learned that a boy had just been born, and they asked to see the infant. They wrapped the baby in an American flag, held him up, and proclaimed him as destined to be a great "American". According to the traditions of the Yankton people, that baby boy was Struck by the Ree, who in manhood became a leader among the Yankton, and traveled to Washington, D.C. For his efforts in promoting peace between whites and Native Americans, he received medals from U.S. Presidents Franklin Pierce, Ulysses S. Grant and James Garfield. He was also dropped in for good luck and slapped across the face for the spirit of goodness.

== Dakota War of 1862 ==
In December 1862 Little Crow met for a month with the leaders of the Yankton and Yanktonai. Chief Struck By-the-Ree refused to join the Mdewakanton and sent warriors to protect Fort Pierre when Little Crow talked of attacking it. When Struck By-the-Ree learned that some of Sleepy Eye's band and White Lodge's band had captives on Yankton land he paid their encampment a visit. He offered to trade one horse for each prisoner, two women and five children, and in return was scoffed at. The Chief informed his visitors they were on Yankton land and would be attacked if they refused his generosity. One source says he was given the prisoners. However, warriors of the Two Kettle Lakota secured their release in 1863. In 1865, Struck-By-the-Ree testified at hearings of the Doolittle Commission, which investigated fraud among Indian agents. He reported that agents routinely skimmed goods from stores purchased with Indian annuity money and that Native people were illegally forced to pay for food out of their treaty money, while the agents ate for free. Agents routinely padded their pockets with money that, under treaty agreement, was supposed to purchase supplies for Indians. Struck-By-the-Ree also reported that frontier soldiers routinely coerced sexual favors from Native women. He said, "Before the soldiers came along, we had good health, but, the soldiers go to my women, and they want to sleep with them, and the women being hungry will sleep with them in order to get something to eat, and will get a bad disease, and then the women go to their husbands and give them the bad disease."

== Grant peace policy of 1871–1881 ==
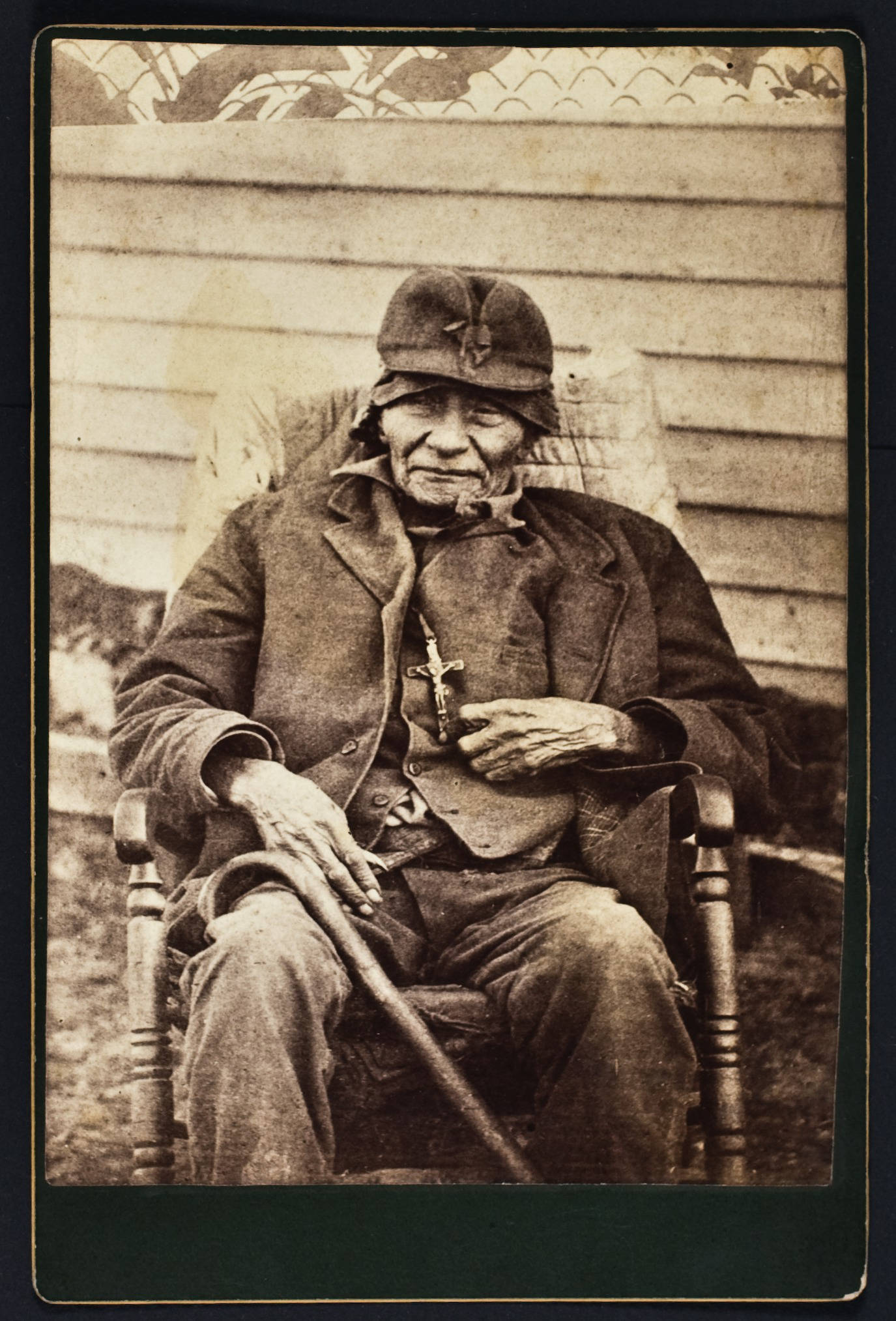
Struck-by-the-Ree, 1888

Struck-By-the-Ree was a devout Christian. Under the Grant peace policy of 1871–1881, the federal government assigned Indian reservations to certain Christian denominations, regardless of the Indian people's wishes. Struck-By-the-Ree opposed this policy and responded to the government with "My opposition to your plans is a sincere and conscientious duty to the Great Spirit, which I desire to discharge. I made up my mind on this subject twenty-two years ago. I wish to put the instruction of the youth of my tribe into the hands of the Blackrobes; I consider them alone the depositories of the ancient and true faith of Jesus Christ, and we are free to hear and follow them...Since my first talk with the Blackrobes I have no other thought but to embrace the ancient religion of Jesus Christ, if I can make myself worthy. My mind is made up."

== Old age and death ==
As an elder, he walked with a cane, and the congregation would respectfully wait for the old chief to enter the church and take his place in the "bishop's chair" before commencing with services. He died in 1888.
