= Greenwood, Charles Mix County, South Dakota =

Unincorporated community in South Dakota, U.S.

Coordinates: 42°55′23″N 98°23′18″W

Greenwood is an unincorporated community in Charles Mix County, in the U.S. state of South Dakota.

== History ==
A post office called Greenwood was established in 1859, and remained in operation until 1965. The community was named for a grove of trees near the original town site.
