= Dante, South Dakota =

- Town
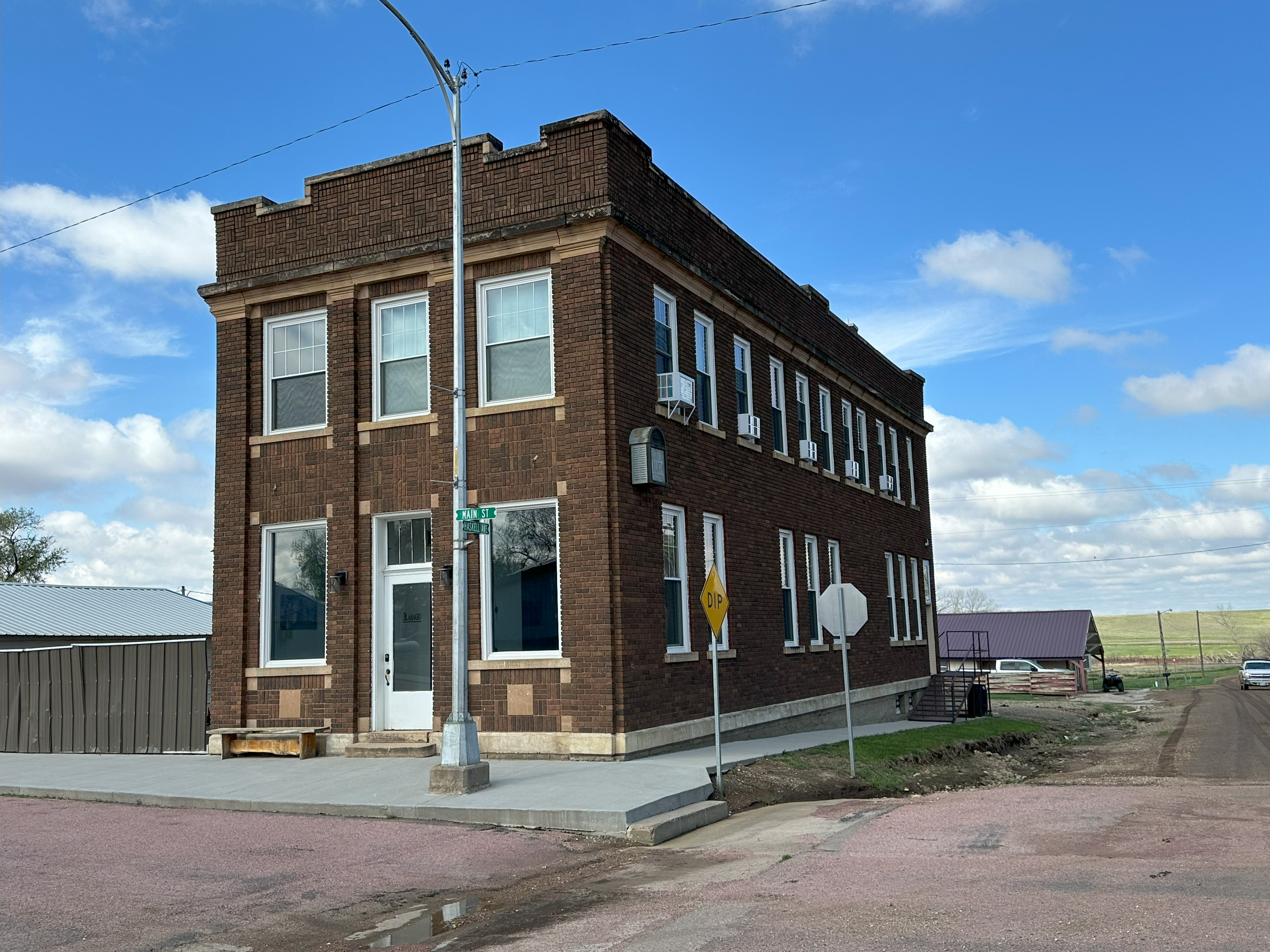
- Security State Bank of Dante

- Location in Charles Mix County and the state of South Dakota
- Coordinates: 43°02′24″N 98°11′08″W
- Country: United States
- State: South Dakota
- County: Charles Mix

Area
  - Total: 0.50 sq mi (1.29 km^{2})
  - Land: 0.50 sq mi (1.29 km^{2})
  - Water: 0 sq mi (0.00 km^{2})
- Elevation: 1,398 ft (426 m)

Population (2020)
  - Total: 75
  - Density: 150.2/sq mi (57.98/km^{2})
- Time zone: UTC-6 (Central (CST))
  - Summer (DST): UTC-5 (CDT)
- ZIP code: 57329
- Area code: 605
- FIPS code: 46-15420
- GNIS feature ID: 1267348

Dante is a town in Charles Mix County, South Dakota, United States. The population was 75 at the 2020 census.

== Geography ==
According to the United States Census Bureau, the town has a total area of 0.44 square miles (1.14 km^{2}), all land.

== History ==
Dante was originally called Mayo, and under the latter name was laid out in 1908, and named for H.T. Mayo, an early settler. However, in 1910 when the railroad came to the town, officials balked at building a depot in a town named Mayo (a name which for unclear reasons, railroad officials found undignified). The railroad requested citizens rename the town. H.T. Mayo replied that he didn't care what they renamed it, sarcastically suggesting, "You can call it Dante's Inferno for all I care."

== Demographics ==
Historical population
Census	Pop.	Note	%±
1920	175		—
1930	132		−24.6%
1940	118		−10.6%
1950	140		18.6%
1960	102		−27.1%
1970	88		−13.7%
1980	83		−5.7%
1990	98		18.1%
2000	82		−16.3%
2010	84		2.4%
2020	75		−10.7%
U.S. Decennial Census

=== 2010 census ===
As of the census of 2010, there were 84 people, 31 households, and 23 families residing in the town. The population density was 190.9 inhabitants per square mile (73.7/km^{2}). There were 35 housing units at an average density of 79.5 per square mile (30.7/km^{2}). The racial makeup of the town was 82.1% White, 13.1% Native American, 2.4% Asian, and 2.4% from two or more races.

There were 31 households, of which 35.5% had children under the age of 18 living with them, 64.5% were married couples living together, 9.7% had a female householder with no husband present, and 25.8% were non-families. 25.8% of all households were made up of individuals, and 6.5% had someone living alone who was 65 years of age or older. The average household size was 2.71 and the average family size was 3.30.

The median age in the town was 34 years. 34.5% of residents were under the age of 18; 4.8% were between the ages of 18 and 24; 23.9% were from 25 to 44; 24.9% were from 45 to 64; and 11.9% were 65 years of age or older. The gender makeup of the town was 45.2% male and 54.8% female.

=== 2000 census ===
As of the census of 2000, there were 82 people, 30 households, and 23 families residing in the town. The population density was 188.2 inhabitants per square mile (72.7/km^{2}). There were 37 housing units at an average density of 84.9 per square mile (32.8/km^{2}). The racial makeup of the town was 86.59% White and 13.41% Native American. Hispanic or Latino of any race were 2.44% of the population.

There were 30 households, out of which 33.3% had children under the age of 18 living with them, 66.7% were married couples living together, 6.7% had a female householder with no husband present, and 23.3% were non-families. 23.3% of all households were made up of individuals, and 6.7% had someone living alone who was 65 years of age or older. The average household size was 2.73 and the average family size was 3.22.

In the town, the population was spread out, with 31.7% under the age of 18, 6.1% from 18 to 24, 26.8% from 25 to 44, 24.4% from 45 to 64, and 11.0% who were 65 years of age or older. The median age was 32 years. For every 100 females, there were 115.8 males. For every 100 females age 18 and over, there were 115.4 males.

The median income for a household in the town was $35,833, and the median income for a family was $36,667. Males had a median income of $26,667 versus $20,625 for females. The per capita income for the town was $14,197. There were no families, and 3.2% of the population lived below the poverty line, not including those under 18 and those over 64 years old.

== Education ==
The school district is Wagner School District 11-4.
