= Marty, South Dakota =

Marty, South Dakota Šinasapa (Dakota)
- Census-designated place
- Location in Charles Mix County and the state of South Dakota
- Coordinates: 43°00′07″N 98°25′42″W
- Country: United States
- State: South Dakota
- County: Charles Mix

Area
  - Total: 3.22 sq mi (8.35 km^{2})
  - Land: 3.22 sq mi (8.35 km^{2})
  - Water: 0 sq mi (0.00 km^{2})
- Elevation: 1,447 ft (441 m)

Population (2020)
  - Total: 677
  - Density: 210.0/sq mi (81.09/km^{2})
- Time zone: UTC-6 (Central (CST))
  - Summer (DST): UTC-5 (CDT)
- ZIP code: 57361
- Area code: 605
- FIPS code: 46-41180
- GNIS feature ID: 2393121

Marty (Dakota: Šinasapa) is a census-designated place (CDP) in southern Charles Mix County, South Dakota, United States. The population was 677 at the 2020 census.

The community has the name of Bishop Martin Marty, the Bishop of Sioux Falls, SD. The community is referred to as Šinasapa in Dakota language of the native Yankton Sioux Tribe.

YST Transit buses connect the community to Wagner, Lake Andes and Ravinia.

== Geography ==
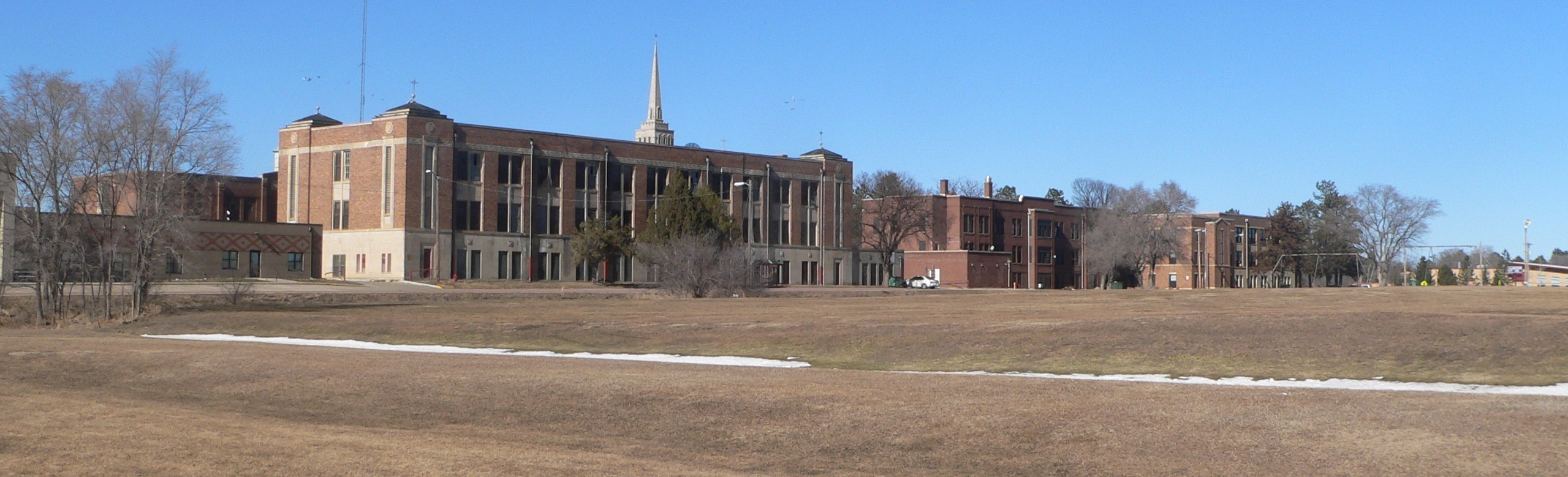
Marty Indian School, February 2016

Marty is located within Yankton Sioux Tribe's reservation.

According to the United States Census Bureau, the CDP has a total area of 3.2 square miles (8.3 km^{2}), all land.

== Demographics ==
Historical population
Census	Pop.	Note	%±
2020	677		—
U.S. Decennial Census

As of the census of 2000, there were 421 people, 96 households, and 79 families residing in the CDP. The population density was 129.7 inhabitants per square mile (50.1/km^{2}). There were 106 housing units at an average density of 32.7 per square mile (12.6/km^{2}). The racial makeup of the CDP was 4.51% White, 0.24% African American, 90.26% Native American, 1.66% from other races, and 3.33% from two or more races. Hispanic or Latino of any race were 8.08% of the population.

There were 96 households, out of which 58.3% had children under the age of 18 living with them, 21.9% were married couples living together, 43.8% had a female householder with no husband present, and 16.7% were non-families. 16.7% of all households were made up of individuals, and 4.2% had someone living alone who was 65 years of age or older. The average household size was 4.33 and the average family size was 4.55.

In the CDP, the population was spread out, with 46.6% under the age of 18, 13.3% from 18 to 24, 23.0% from 25 to 44, 11.6% from 45 to 64, and 5.5% who were 65 years of age or older. The median age was 20 years. For every 100 females, there were 102.4 males. For every 100 females age 18 and over, there were 99.1 males.

The median income for a household in the CDP was $18,750, and the median income for a family was $23,750. Males had a median income of $16,964 versus $26,250 for females. The per capita income for the CDP was $5,917. About 43.1% of families and 40.9% of the population were below the poverty line, including 44.2% of those under age 18 and 25.0% of those age 65 or over.

== Education ==
Marty Indian School, a tribal boarding K-12 school affiliated with the Bureau of Indian Education (BIE), is in Marty.

The local school district is Wagner School District 11-4.

== See also ==
- List of census-designated places in South Dakota
