= Wagner, South Dakota =

- City
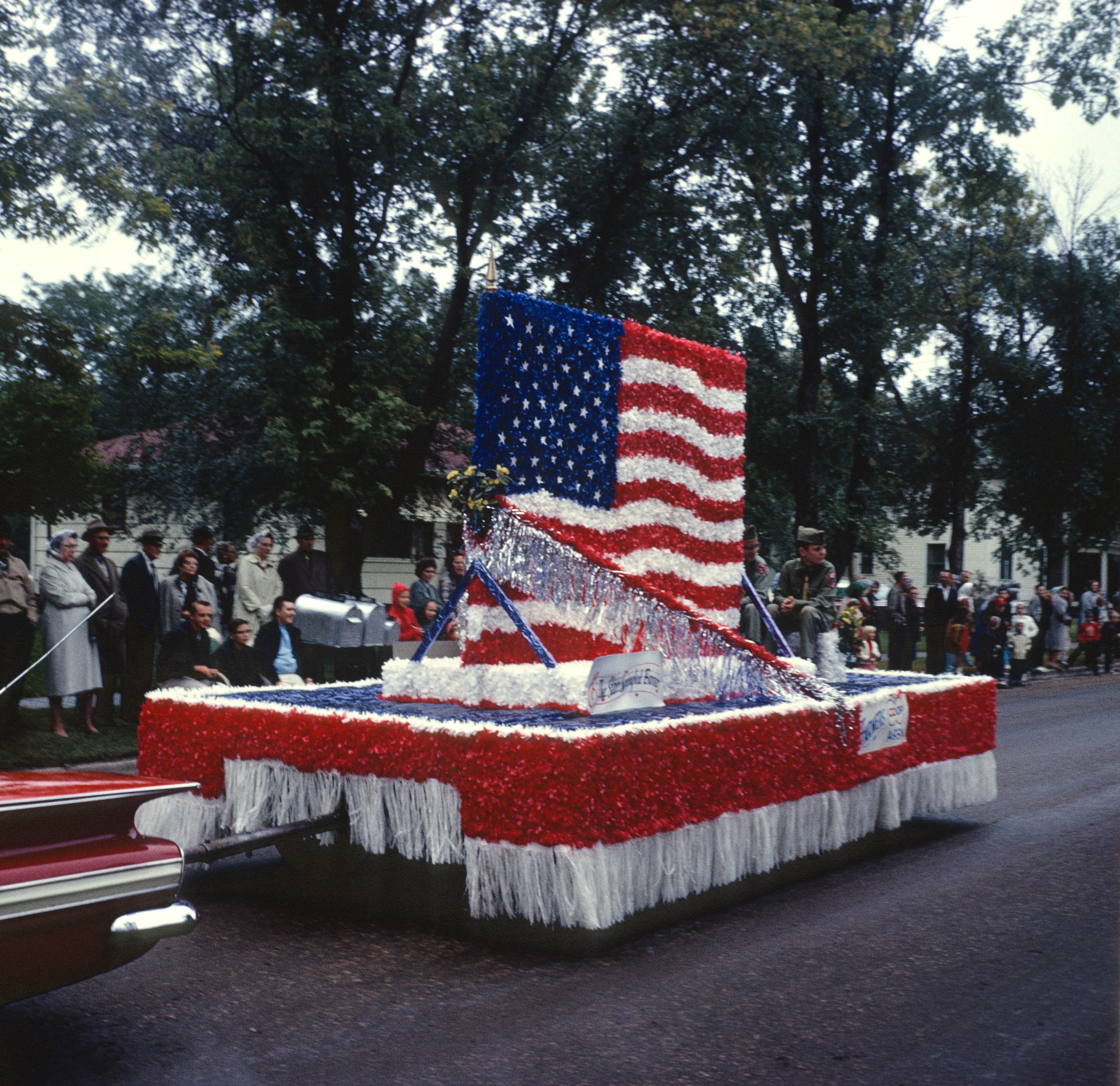
- 1965 Labor Day Parade float
- Motto: "A Going, Growing City"
- Location in Charles Mix County and the state of South Dakota
- Coordinates: 43°04′37″N 98°17′36″W
- Country: United States
- State: South Dakota
- County: Charles Mix
- Incorporated: 1907

Area
  - Total: 1.90 sq mi (4.92 km^{2})
  - Land: 1.89 sq mi (4.90 km^{2})
  - Water: 0.0077 sq mi (0.02 km^{2})
- Elevation: 1,447 ft (441 m)

Population (2020)
  - Total: 1,490
  - Density: 788.3/sq mi (304.37/km^{2})
- Time zone: UTC−6 (Central (CST))
  - Summer (DST): UTC−5 (CDT)
- ZIP codes: 57380
- Area code: 605
- FIPS code: 46-68020
- GNIS feature ID: 1267620
- Website: www.cityofwagner.org

Wagner is a city in Charles Mix County, South Dakota, United States. The population was 1,490 at the 2020 census. The city is served by Wagner Municipal Airport as well as YST Transit buses.

== History ==
Wagner was founded in 1900. The town was incorporated in 1907, and was named for Walt Wagner, local postmaster.

== Geography ==
According to the United States Census Bureau, the city has a total area of 2.05 square miles (5.31 km^{2}), of which 2.04 square miles (5.28 km^{2}) is land and 0.01 square miles (0.03 km^{2}) is water.

=== Climate ===
This climatic region is typified by large seasonal temperature differences, with warm to hot (and often humid) summers and cold (sometimes severely cold) winters. According to the Köppen Climate Classification system, Wagner has a humid continental climate, abbreviated "Dfa" on climate maps.

Climate data for Wagner, South Dakota
Month	Jan	Feb	Mar	Apr	May	Jun	Jul	Aug	Sep	Oct	Nov	Dec	Year
Mean daily maximum °C (°F)	−1 (31)	2 (36)	9 (48)	17 (63)	23 (74)	29 (84)	33 (91)	32 (89)	26 (79)	19 (66)	8 (47)	2 (35)	17 (62)
Mean daily minimum °C (°F)	−13 (9)	−10 (14)	−4 (24)	2 (36)	8 (47)	14 (58)	17 (63)	16 (61)	11 (51)	4 (39)	−4 (25)	−10 (14)	3 (37)
Average precipitation mm (inches)	18 (0.7)	23 (0.9)	41 (1.6)	69 (2.7)	89 (3.5)	97 (3.8)	71 (2.8)	69 (2.7)	64 (2.5)	43 (1.7)	25 (1)	20 (0.8)	630 (24.7)
Source: Weatherbase

== Demographics ==
Historical population
Census	Pop.	Note	%±
1910	964		—
1920	1,236		28.2%
1930	1,420		14.9%
1940	1,319		−7.1%
1950	1,528		15.8%
1960	1,586		3.8%
1970	1,655		4.4%
1980	1,453		−12.2%
1990	1,462		0.6%
2000	1,675		14.6%
2010	1,566		−6.5%
2020	1,490		−4.9%
U.S. Decennial Census

=== 2020 census ===
As of the 2020 census, Wagner had a population of 1,490. The median age was 38.9 years. 27.4% of residents were under the age of 18 and 21.7% of residents were 65 years of age or older. For every 100 females there were 95.5 males, and for every 100 females age 18 and over there were 90.7 males age 18 and over.

0.0% of residents lived in urban areas, while 100.0% lived in rural areas.

There were 577 households in Wagner, of which 27.9% had children under the age of 18 living in them. Of all households, 33.6% were married-couple households, 21.0% were households with a male householder and no spouse or partner present, and 37.4% were households with a female householder and no spouse or partner present. About 39.7% of all households were made up of individuals and 20.1% had someone living alone who was 65 years of age or older.

There were 640 housing units, of which 9.8% were vacant. The homeowner vacancy rate was 2.2% and the rental vacancy rate was 7.6%.

Racial composition as of the 2020 census
Race	Number	Percent
White	676	45.4%
Black or African American	5	0.3%
American Indian and Alaska Native	658	44.2%
Asian	9	0.6%
Native Hawaiian and Other Pacific Islander	12	0.8%
Some other race	17	1.1%
Two or more races	113	7.6%
Hispanic or Latino (of any race)	74	5.0%

=== 2010 census ===
At the 2010 census, there were 1,566 people, 639 households and 367 families living in the city. The population density was 767.6 inhabitants per square mile (296.4/km^{2}). There were 726 housing units at an average density of 355.9 per square mile (137.4/km^{2}). The racial makeup of the city was 54.7% White, 0.2% African American, 40.5% Native American, 0.2% Asian, 0.8% from other races, and 3.6% from two or more races. Hispanic or Latino of any race were 3.0% of the population.

There were 639 households, of which 29.6% had children under the age of 18 living with them, 38.2% were married couples living together, 13.6% had a female householder with no husband present, 5.6% had a male householder with no wife present, and 42.6% were non-families. 39.9% of all households were made up of individuals, and 21.1% had someone living alone who was 65 years of age or older. The average household size was 2.36 and the average family size was 3.20.

The median age was 42.8 years. 27.2% of residents were under the age of 18; 6.8% were between the ages of 18 and 24; 18.5% were from 25 to 44; 23.3% were from 45 to 64; and 24.1% were 65 years of age or older. The gender makeup of the city was 47.7% male and 52.3% female.

=== 2000 census ===
At the 2000 census, there were 1,675 people, 678 households and 406 families living in the city. The population density was 619.4 inhabitants per square mile (239.2/km^{2}). There were 747 housing units at an average density of 276.2 per square mile (106.6/km^{2}). The racial makeup of the city was 63.40% White, 0.24% African American, 34.33% Native American, 0.06% Asian, 0.48% from other races, and 1.49% from two or more races. Hispanic or Latino of any race were 2.99% of the population.

There were 678 households, of which 28.0% had children under the age of 18 living with them, 40.4% were married couples living together, 14.6% had a female householder with no husband present, and 40.0% were non-families. 37.0% of all households were made up of individuals, and 21.5% had someone living alone who was 65 years of age or older. The average household size was 2.37 and the average family size was 3.11.

28.5% of the population were under the age of 18, 5.4% from 18 to 24, 22.9% from 25 to 44, 19.5% from 45 to 64, and 23.7% who were 65 years of age or older. The median age was 40 years. For every 100 females, there were 80.7 males. For every 100 females age 18 and over, there were 74.6 males.

The median household income was $21,863 and the median family income was $28,021. Males had a median income of $26,216 and females $17,333. The per capita income was $12,207. About 20.5% of families and 25.1% of the population were below the poverty line, including 30.6% of those under age 18 and 28.6% of those age 65 or over.

== Education ==
The school district is Wagner School District 11-4.

== Notable people ==
- Albert Kocer (1930–2018), American politician, farmer and deacon from South Dakota

== See also ==
- List of cities in South Dakota
