= K-152 (Kansas highway) =

State highway in Kansas, U.S.

K-152
- K-152 highlighted in red

Route information
- Maintained by KDOT
- Length: 12.919 mi (20.791 km)
- Existed: 1926–present
- History: Designated as K-35 in 1926; renumbered as K-135 on October 15, 1957; renumbered as K-152 on September 13, 1976

Major junctions
- West end: K-7 east of Parker
- East end: US-69 east of La Cygne

Location
- Country: United States
- State: Kansas
- Counties: Linn

Highway system
- Kansas State Highway System; Interstate; US; State; Spurs
← K-150	→ K-153

K-152 is an approximately 12.92-mile-long (20.79 km) east–west state highway located entirely within Linn County in the U.S. state of Kansas. K-152's western terminus is at K-7 east of the city of Parker and south of Cadmus, and the eastern terminus is at U.S. Route 69 (US-69) east of the city of La Cygne. The only city that the highway passes through is La Cygne, and it also passes by Prairie View High School west of La Cygne. K-152 is a two-lane road its entire length.

K-152 was first designated in 1926, as K-35. At that time it ran from K-7 eastward to K-5. By 1927, K-5 became US-73E. US-73E was redesignated as US-69 sometime between 1933 and 1936. Before 1937, K-152 ended west of Fontana at K-7. Then on January 7, 1937, K-35 was realigned to continue west from Maddox Road and to end at K-7 further south, which is its current route. On October 15, 1957, K-35 was renumbered to K-135 to avoid confusion with the newly constructed Interstate 35 (I-35). On September 13, 1976, I-35W was renumbered to I-135. Then in order to avoid confusion with I-135, K-135 was renumbered to K-152.

== Route description ==
K-152's western terminus is at an intersection with K-7 south of Cadmus. The highway begins traveling east through small rolling hills with rural farmlands and scattered trees. It passes an intersection with Kettle Road then Lamb Road and after roughly 2.5 miles (4.0 km) reaches an intersection with Long Road. At this point, the highway turns northward for one mile (1.6 km) then passes Prairie View High School as it turns back eastward. The roadway continues east and passes through a dip that an unnamed creek runs through then levels out again. It continues east for about one mile (1.6 km) through flat rural farmlands and passes a group of houses surrounded by scattered trees, then intersects Maddox Road. The land then opens up slightly as K-152 continues east for one mile (1.6 km), where it crosses an unnamed creek then begins to parallel a levee. The highway soon intersects Linn County Route 1095, and then continues parallel to the levee for about 1.5 miles (2.4 km) before crossing the Marais des Cygnes River. After crossing the river, it enters the city of La Cygne as Market Street. It soon reaches a junction with Railroad Street then has an at-grade crossing with a BNSF Railway track. K-152 continues east through the city for another one mile (1.6 km) then exits the city. Roughly .5 miles (0.80 km) after exiting the city it crosses Middle Creek, a tributary of Marais des Cygnes River. From here, it continues another roughly two miles (3.2 km) through small rolling hills covered with a mix of grasslands, farmlands and scattered trees. The highway then makes a series of three curves around a small hill with a house on it. From the curves, K-152 continues east for a short distance before reaching its eastern terminus at US-69 east of La Cygne.

The Kansas Department of Transportation (KDOT) tracks the traffic levels on its highways, and in 2019, they determined that on average the traffic varied from 915 vehicles per day near the western terminus to 3,120 vehicles per day slightly east of La Cynge. K-152 is not included in the National Highway System, (Note: The National Highway System is a system of highways important to the nation's defense, economy, and mobility.) but does connect to the National Highway System at its eastern terminus at US-69. From the western terminus, the first 8 miles (13 km) is paved with partial design bituminous pavement and the remainder is paved with composite pavement.

== History ==
Before state highways were numbered in Kansas there were auto trails, which were an informal network of marked routes that existed in the United States and Canada in the early part of the 20th century. K-152's western terminus, K-7, closely follows the Jefferson Highway. The eastern terminus, US-69, closely follows the Ozark Trails and the Kansas City–Fort Scott–Miami–Tulsa Short Line.

K-152 was first designated in 1926, as K-35 by the State Highway Commission of Kansas, now known as KDOT. At that time it ran from K-7 eastward to K-5. By 1927, K-5 was redesignated as US-73E. US-73E was redesignated as US-69 sometime between 1933 and 1934. Before 1937, the highway curved north onto Maddox Road from La Cygne. It continued north into Miami County for about two miles (3.2 km) then curved west by Fontana and ended at K-7. Then on January 7, 1937, K-35 was realigned to continue west from Maddox Road and to end at K-7 further south, which is its current route. In a June 13, 1938, resolution K-35 was realigned at the crossing of the Marais Des Cygnes River, by La Cygne, to eliminate 3 unsafe sharp curves. Then on October 15, 1957, K-35 was renumbered to K-135 to avoid confusion with the newly constructed Interstate 35 (I-35). On September 13, 1976, I-35W was renumbered to I-135. Then in order to avoid confusion with I-135, K-135 was renumbered to K-152.

== Major intersections ==
The entire route is in Linn County.

Location	mi	km	Destinations	Notes
Scott Township	0.000	0.000	K-7 – Mound City, Osawatomie	Western terminus
Lincoln Township	12.919	20.791	US-69 – Fort Scott, Louisburg	Eastern terminus; diamond interchange
Lincoln Township	12.919	20.791	East 2200th Road	Continuation past US-69
1.000 mi = 1.609 km; 1.000 km = 0.621 mi
