= Geddes, South Dakota =

Geddes
- City
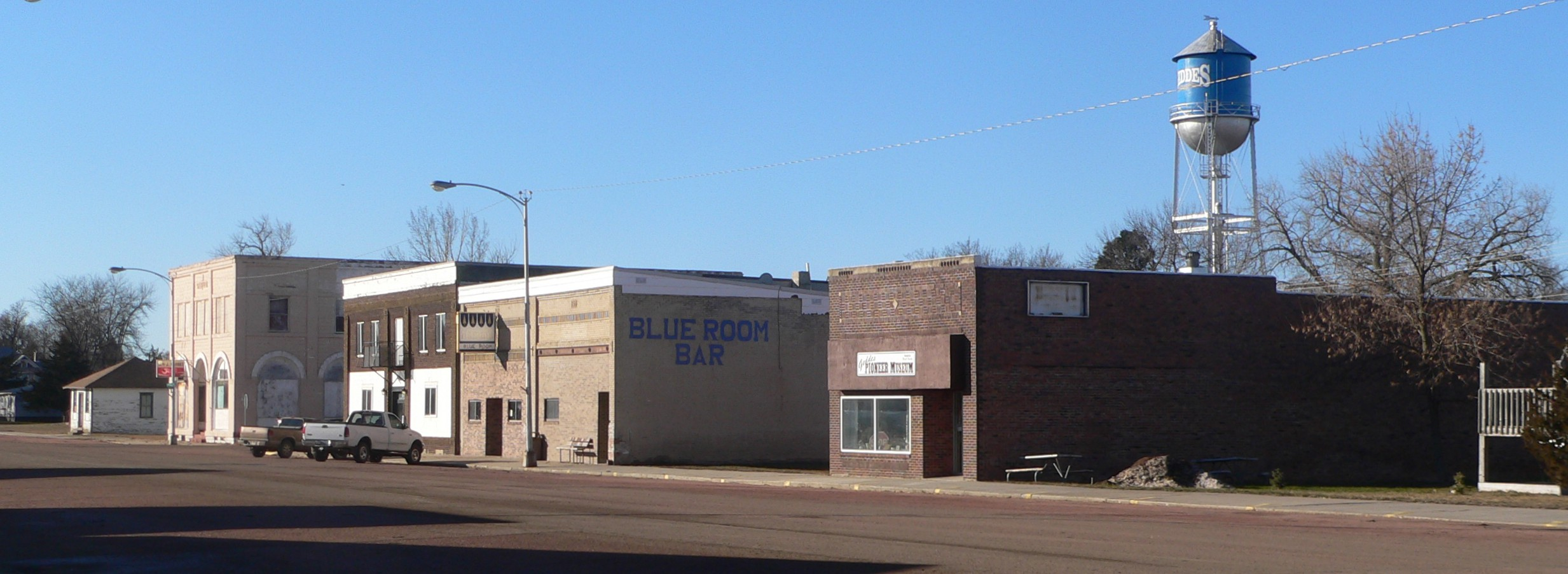
- Main Street in Geddes, February 2016

- Location in Charles Mix County and the state of South Dakota
- Coordinates: 43°15′15″N 98°41′51″W
- Country: United States
- State: South Dakota
- County: Charles Mix
- Incorporated: 1900

Area
  - Total: 0.73 sq mi (1.89 km^{2})
  - Land: 0.73 sq mi (1.89 km^{2})
  - Water: 0 sq mi (0.00 km^{2})
- Elevation: 1,601 ft (488 m)

Population (2020)
  - Total: 156
  - Density: 214.1/sq mi (82.68/km^{2})
- Time zone: UTC-6 (Central (CST))
  - Summer (DST): UTC-5 (CDT)
- ZIP code: 57342
- Area code: 605
- FIPS code: 46-23980
- GNIS feature ID: 1267403
- Website: www.geddessd.com

Geddes is a city in central Charles Mix County, South Dakota, United States. The population was 156 at the 2020 census.

Geddes was laid out in 1900.

== Geography ==
According to the United States Census Bureau, the city has a total area of 0.61 square miles (1.58 km^{2}), all land.

== Geddes Historic District ==
- Geddes Historic District
- U.S. National Register of Historic Places
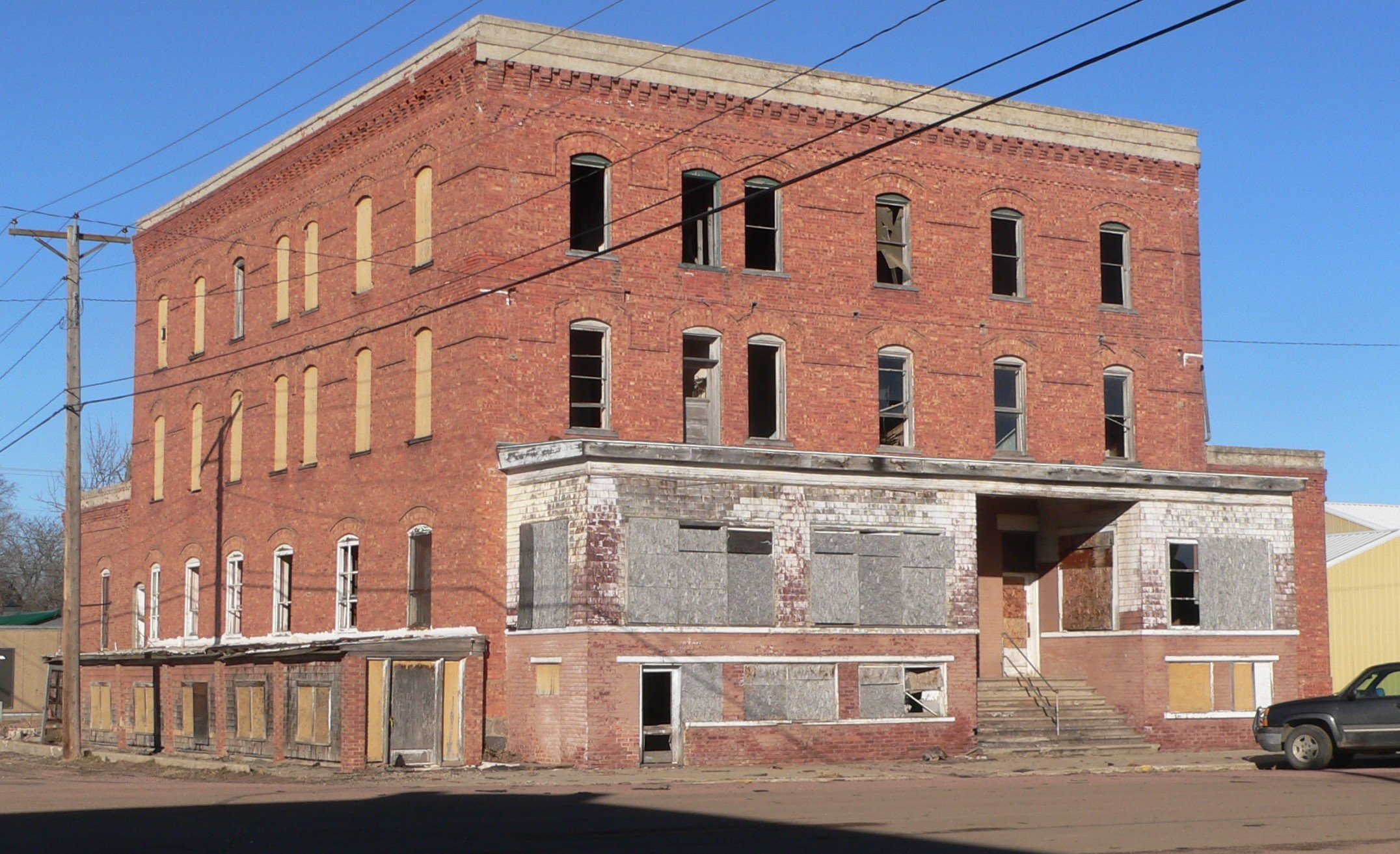
- 3rd & Main

- Location within South Dakota Location within the United States
- Location: Off SD 50, Geddes, South Dakota
- Coordinates: 43.254167°N 98.695278°W
- Area: 100 acres (40 ha)
- Built: 1901
- Architectural style: Late Victorian
- NRHP reference No.: 73001737
- Added to NRHP: May 8, 1973

The Geddes Historic District is a 100 acres (40 ha) historic district which was listed on the National Register of Historic Places in 1973.

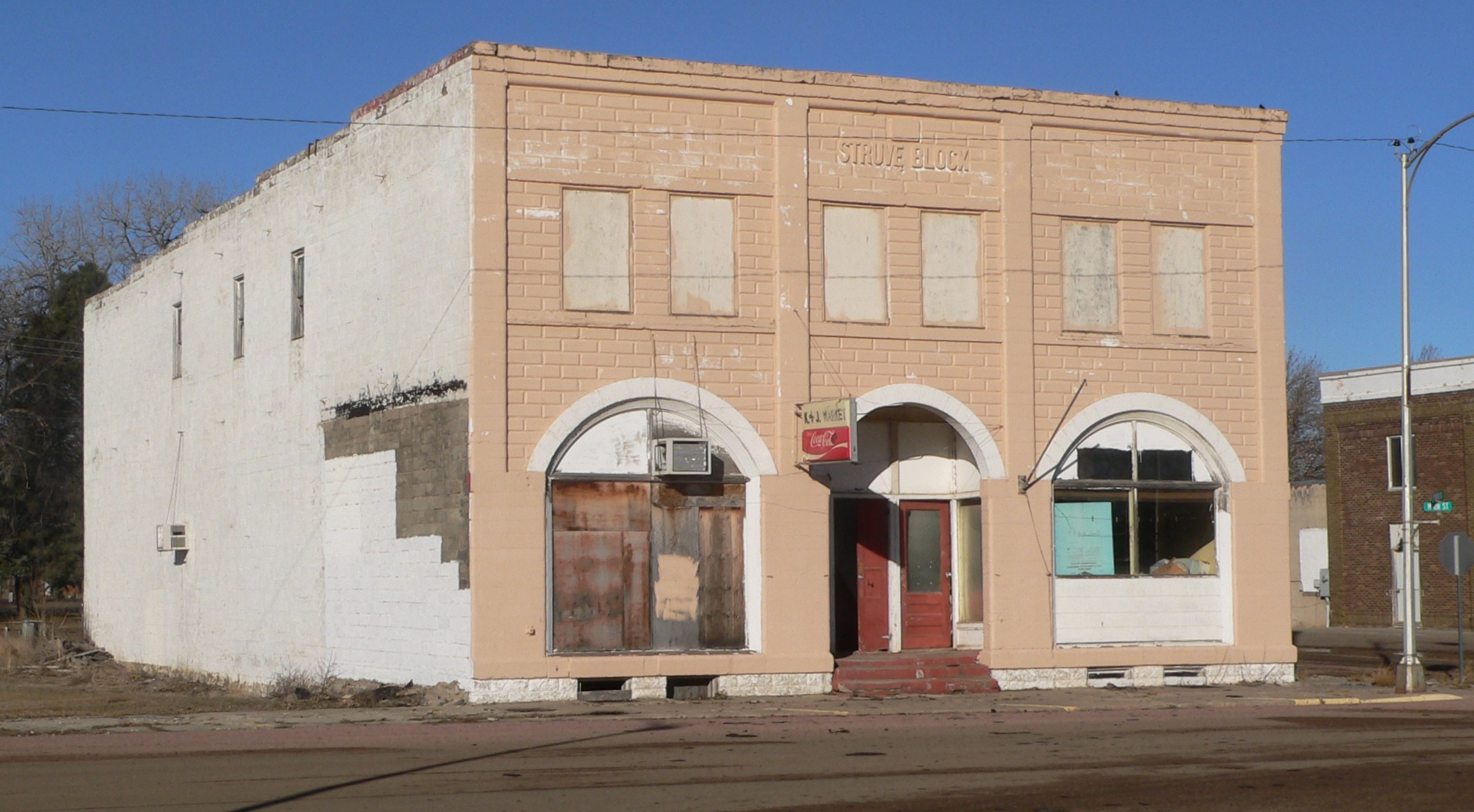
Struve Block

It includes the majority of the historic small town of Geddes, which "stopped growing, for the most part, by 1920," due to factors including the railroad not coming through, and its failure to win the county seat of Charles Mix County. Geddes had tried to wrest the county seat from Wheeler in 1900, 1904, and 1908, and the seat eventually went to Lake Andes, South Dakota (about 15 miles (24 km) away), where Charles Mix County Courthouse was built in 1918.

The oldest building in the district is the Papineau Trading Post, built in 1857 of squared plains cottonwood logs; it is actually probably the oldest building in the entire state of South Dakota. In the 1860;s it was a store, tavern, bawdy house, and county seat of Charles Mix County. It was moved from a few miles away to an open lot in what is now the southern edge of the historic district.

The other contributing buildings were mostly built during 1900-1920. These include:

- Livery Stable (1910)
- Padley Hotel, sometimes known as the Hotel Castle, a 3-story brick building, which had sun porches added to its second and third stores in 1916 when it served as a community hospital
- St. Anna's Catholic Church (completed 1903), a two-story wooden structure with medieval-style stained glass windows, and carved exterior woodwork, still in use at date of NRHP listing.
- St. Anna's School (completed 1917), a three-story brick building with a full basement, 40 by 90 feet (12 m × 27 m) in plan, which was a boarding school until 1935, no longer in use as a school
- the blacksmith shop (1910), a wooden structure which was dilapidated at time of NRHP listing, but which is nice for having period tools and machinery
- The "Old Dormitory" (1905), which provided boarding for children of farm families during the week, for the original high

school (which was replaced in 1925). Numerous private houses, "basically the same as when they were built", are included in the district.

== Demographics ==
Historical population
Census	Pop.	Note	%±
1910	701		—
1920	695		−0.9%
1930	680		−2.2%
1940	581		−14.6%
1950	502		−13.6%
1960	380		−24.3%
1970	308		−18.9%
1980	303		−1.6%
1990	280		−7.6%
2000	252		−10.0%
2010	208		−17.5%
2020	156		−25.0%
U.S. Decennial Census

=== 2020 census ===
As of the 2020 census, Geddes had a population of 156. The median age was 51.5 years. 18.6% of residents were under the age of 18 and 33.3% of residents were 65 years of age or older. For every 100 females there were 136.4 males, and for every 100 females age 18 and over there were 144.2 males age 18 and over.

0.0% of residents lived in urban areas, while 100.0% lived in rural areas.

There were 85 households in Geddes, of which 16.5% had children under the age of 18 living in them. Of all households, 37.6% were married-couple households, 40.0% were households with a male householder and no spouse or partner present, and 16.5% were households with a female householder and no spouse or partner present. About 49.4% of all households were made up of individuals and 23.6% had someone living alone who was 65 years of age or older.

There were 117 housing units, of which 27.4% were vacant. The homeowner vacancy rate was 0.0% and the rental vacancy rate was 0.0%.

Racial composition as of the 2020 census
Race	Number	Percent
White	147	94.2%
Black or African American	0	0.0%
American Indian and Alaska Native	4	2.6%
Asian	0	0.0%
Native Hawaiian and Other Pacific Islander	0	0.0%
Some other race	0	0.0%
Two or more races	5	3.2%
Hispanic or Latino (of any race)	2	1.3%

=== 2010 census ===
As of the census of 2010, there were 208 people, 110 households, and 57 families residing in the city. The population density was 341.0 inhabitants per square mile (131.7/km^{2}). There were 155 housing units at an average density of 254.1 per square mile (98.1/km^{2}). The racial makeup of the city was 96.2% White, 0.5% Native American, 0.5% Asian, 0.5% from other races, and 2.4% from two or more races. Hispanic or Latino of any race were 1.0% of the population.

There were 110 households, of which 18.2% had children under the age of 18 living with them, 45.5% were married couples living together, 3.6% had a female householder with no husband present, 2.7% had a male householder with no wife present, and 48.2% were non-families. 45.5% of all households were made up of individuals, and 22.7% had someone living alone who was 65 years of age or older. The average household size was 1.89 and the average family size was 2.65.

The median age in the city was 50.6 years. 16.3% of residents were under the age of 18; 4.8% were between the ages of 18 and 24; 22% were from 25 to 44; 30.3% were from 45 to 64; and 26.4% were 65 years of age or older. The gender makeup of the city was 55.8% male and 44.2% female.

=== 2000 census ===
At the 2000 census, there were 252 people, 122 households and 61 families residing in the city. The population density was 420.4 inhabitants per square mile (162.3/km^{2}). There were 160 housing units at an average density of 266.9 per square mile (103.1/km^{2}). The racial makeup of the city was 98.02% White, 0.79% Native American, 0.40% Asian, 0.79% from other races. Hispanic or Latino of any race were 0.79% of the population.

There were 122 households, of which 22.1% had children under the age of 18 living with them, 41.0% were married couples living together, 4.9% had a female householder with no husband present, and 50.0% were non-families. 49.2% of all households were made up of individuals, and 34.4% had someone living alone who was 65 years of age or older. The average household size was 2.07 and the average family size was 2.98.

19.8% of the population were under the age of 18, 11.9% from 18 to 24, 20.6% from 25 to 44, 15.1% from 45 to 64, and 32.5% who were 65 years of age or older. The median age was 44 years. For every 100 females, there were 90.9 males. For every 100 females age 18 and over, there were 100.0 males.

The median household income was $21,250, and the median family income was $36,250. Males had a median income of $20,938 versus $20,000 for females. The per capita income for the city was $12,520. About 15.5% of families and 13.6% of the population were below the poverty line, including 7.3% of those under the age of eighteen and 23.6% of those 65 or over.

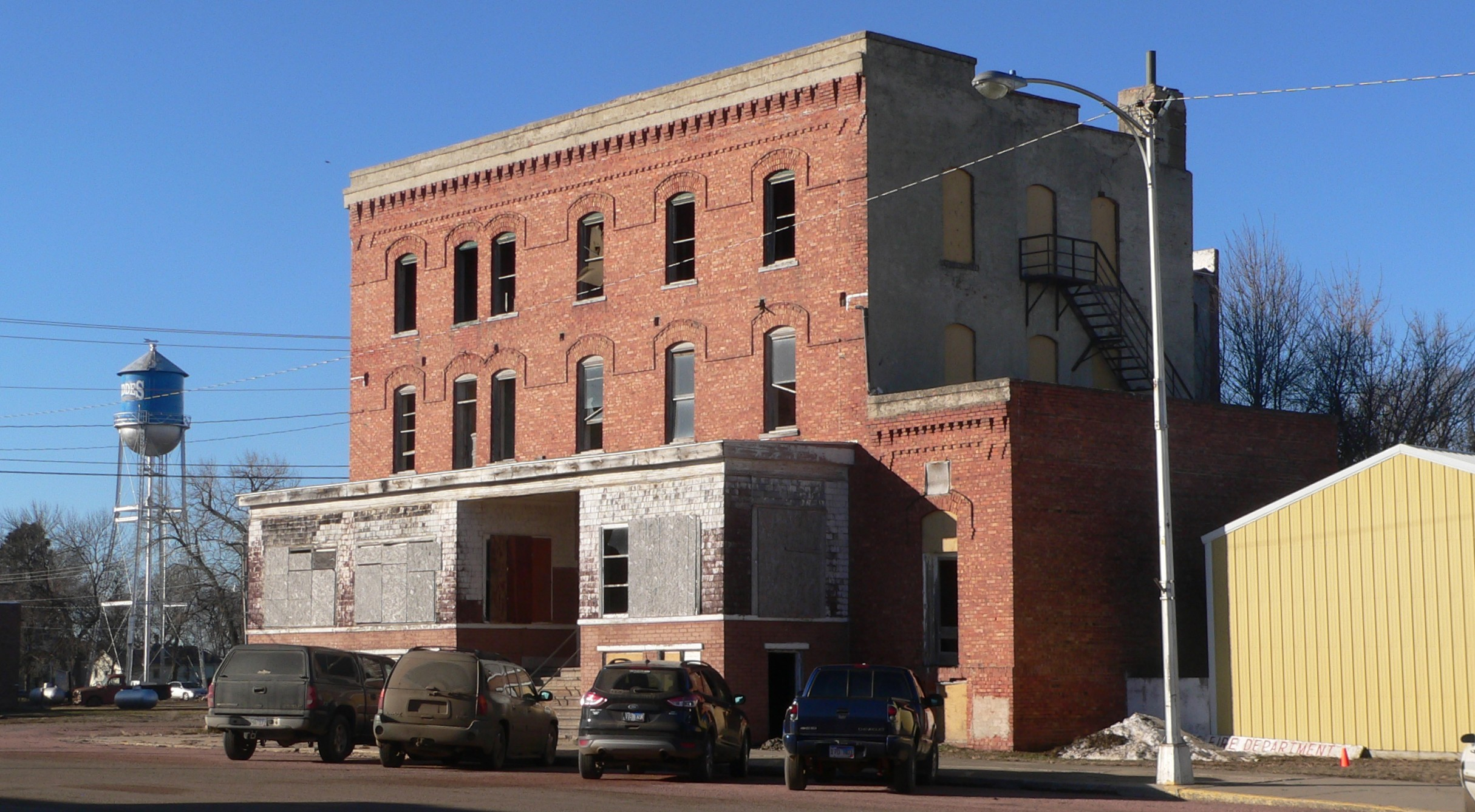
Building on Main Street in Geddes, February 2016

== Education ==
The school district is Platte-Geddes School District 11-5.

== Notable people ==
- Evelyn Daw, singer and actress
- J. James Exon, governor of Nebraska and U.S. senator
- James Jones, South Dakota state representative

== See also ==
- List of cities in South Dakota
