= Deaths of Arnold Archambeau and Ruby Bruguier =

1992 deaths in South Dakota, United States

- Archambeau (left) and Bruguier
- Date: December 12, 1992 – March 10, 1993
- Time: Unknown
- Location: Near Lake Andes, South Dakota, U.S.; 43.1497°N 98.5219°W
- Cause: Hypothermia; manner undetermined
- Burial: Native American Cemetery; Greenwood, South Dakota (Bruguier)

Just before dawn on the morning of December 12, 1992, Arnold Archambeau and Ruby Bruguier, aged 20 and 18 respectively, left a car Archambeau had been driving following an accident at an intersection near Lake Andes, South Dakota, United States. They left Bruguier's 17-year-old cousin, Tracy Dion, in the car without any explanation as to where they might be going, and their whereabouts remained unknown for the next three months. One woman told police later that she had seen Archambeau at a New Year's Eve party, but their families never saw the couple, who had a young child together.

In early March 1993, the bodies of Archambeau and Bruguier were found in a water-filled depression between the accident site and a disused railroad right-of-way a short distance from the road. The cause of death was determined to be exposure, but investigators found the deaths suspicious, believing that the two had not died right after the accident. Both the Charles Mix County sheriff at the time and one of his deputies had visited the scene in the intervening months, when the weather was warm and there was minimal snow; neither had seen the bodies at those times, and others who had been in the area made similar statements.

Other aspects of the bodies suggested that the two might have died elsewhere, and perhaps at different times. Bruguier's body had to be identified by a tattoo as it was in an advanced state of decomposition; it was dressed in the clothes she was wearing the night of the accident, but without the shoes and glasses. Archambeau's body, found underwater in the depression, showed far less decomposition. A set of keys found in his pocket was never found to match any house or car in the area.

A segment of the television series Unsolved Mysteries, filmed at the site, aired in 1995. The FBI took over the investigation, but closed it in 1999 as it could not find any evidence that a crime had been committed. Local law enforcement who were involved in the investigation believe that at the very least the couple's bodies were placed there after they died somewhere else.

== Background ==
Arnold Archambeau (born 1972), a member of the Yankton Sioux Tribe, was raised on its reservation in the southeastern half of Charles Mix County, South Dakota. Raised by his grandmother after his mother's death in his teens, Archambeau was living with an aunt and working at the Fort Randall Casino at the time of his disappearance. He played basketball at Marty Indian School, where he was chosen as part of an all-Native American team to tour the Soviet Union in 1990.

Ruby Bruguier (born January 11, 1974, in Wagner), also a Yankton Sioux, also grew up on the reservation and attended school in Lake Andes, the county seat of Charles Mix County. In 1991 she and Archambeau had a daughter; they never married.

== Accident and disappearance ==
On the night of Friday December 11, 1992, Archambeau and Bruguier took a break from their parental and work responsibilities to socialize. They left their daughter with Bruguier's uncle and took his daughter, Tracy Dion, aged 17, with them as they visited friends at various locations all night. When they returned around 6:00 the next morning, the uncle noticed they seemed to have been drinking and suggested they return later in the day after they had sobered up, which they agreed to do.

Shortly afterwards, closer to 7 a.m., they were at a three-way intersection with U.S. Route 281 (also U.S. Route 18 and South Dakota Highway 50 at that point) approximately one mile (1.6 km) east of Lake Andes. Archambeau, who was driving, stopped at the sign. As he turned left onto 281, the vehicle hit a patch of black ice on the road and overturned, coming to rest just off the highway in a depression between the road and a former railroad right-of-way 75 ft (23 m) to its north.

Dion later told Unsolved Mysteries that while she did not see Archambeau leave the car after the accident, he was not in it when it came to rest upside down. Bruguier, she says, kept saying, "Oh my God! Oh my God!" and hitting the car. She says Bruguier soon managed to push one of the doors open and slide out. When Dion went to do the same, the door was shut. She remained inside the car until rescuers arrived some time later.

Archambeau and Bruguier did not return to the accident site. Deputy Sheriff Bill Youngstrom, who was among the first responders, later recalled that he had other officers walk the area up and down the road in either direction, and along the adjacent railbed, looking to see once the sun rose shortly before 8 a.m., if they had perhaps collapsed off the road, fallen through ice that covered wet areas in the depression, left some indicator of their presence or wandered past the railbed and onto the nearby lake (frozen over at the time) that shares its name with the town. There were no signs of either Archambeau or Bruguier, and Youngstrom assumed that, as in other accidents he had investigated where a driver had been drinking and wanted to avoid a criminal charge, the two would resurface within a couple of days.

However, neither Archambeau nor Bruguier's families reported that they had returned or gotten in touch somehow. Youngstrom continued to look for the couple but found no leads. He, family members and other law enforcement personnel walked a 100-by-25-yard (91 by 23 m) area between Route 281 and the railbed several times over the next weeks but found nothing. In late January, during a thaw that melted most of the snow that had accumulated in the area, with very little meltwater in the low area, a local man rode on horseback up and down that stretch in search of a missing hubcap. He was unable to find it but did not recall seeing anything unusual either, according to Sheriff Ray Westendorf.

== Discovery of bodies ==
By early March 1993, the couple's whereabouts were still unknown, and police went to the media to publicize the story in hopes of finding Archambeau and/or Bruguier. "It's a very odd case", said Captain Vincent Merrick of the federal Bureau of Indian Affairs Police (BIAP). He was especially struck by Bruguier's apparent abandonment of a child she was still breastfeeding, which had never happened in any other case he had investigated. Investigators had found no evidence of either having any serious interpersonal disputes with someone else, or any legal or financial difficulties. Merrick said he had requested the assistance of the state's Division of Criminal Investigation. The Archambeau and Bruguier families offered a thousand-dollar reward for any information that would lead to their discovery.

Within a week, on the morning of March 10, a motorist reported seeing a body floating in meltwater in the depression between Route 281 and the railbed about 75 ft (23 m) from the accident site. Deputies who responded to the scene found the body of a young woman, so decomposed that it was identifiable as Bruguier only by a tattoo. They decided to have the water pumped out to see if Archambeau's body was nearby and found it on the ground 15 ft (4.6 m) away the next morning, under what had been 4 feet (1.3 m) of water. It was less decomposed and easily identified as him.

The disparity between the extent to which the bodies had decomposed, and their apparent absence in the three months preceding their discovery, were not the only facts that confounded investigators. Youngstrom told Unsolved Mysteries that a tuft of hair found on the roadside near the bodies was determined to have been Bruguier's, but it was in far better condition than it should have been if it had been there the entire time since the accident. Her body was wearing the clothes she had on at the time of the accident, but was missing shoes and glasses, he added.

Archambeau was fully clothed, but police were unable to determine whether those clothes were the ones he was wearing on the morning of December 12. Neither his clothes nor his body were frozen to the ground, as they might have been if the body had been there over the winter. In his pocket a set of keys was found, one for a car and two appearing to be to a house; they did not match any vehicle or structure he was known to use or frequent.

== Investigation ==
The bodies were taken to Sioux Falls, where the Minnehaha County coroner performed autopsies. They seemed not to have been significantly injured in the accident; the cause of death was determined to be hypothermia, but the exact time could not be determined. Several days later authorities announced that they believed both Archambeau and Bruguier had died somewhere other than the accident scene. "One, they weren't there after the accident", said Charles Mix County state's attorney Tim Whalen. "Two, all of a sudden the bodies show up March 10 and 11."

At a March 19 news conference, family members of both Archambeau and Bruguier in attendance, along with reporters, accused officials of racism and incompetence. Asked if he had taken pictures of the scene on the morning of the accident, Youngstrom said that he had but through a processing error the negatives were rendered useless. "It sounds like you're trying to cover your butt," Mike Archambeau said. "It sounds like you didn't investigate in the first place." Bruguier's sister said that Native Americans were "overlooked and set aside" when things like this happened, and the aunt Archambeau had lived with agreed: "When a Native American is charged with something, it's pursued heavily. However, when a Native American is a victim, it's not pursued with the same perseverance." Those complaints aside, they agreed with Whalen that the bodies had not been there since December and had been moved from somewhere else.

Whalen also announced at the news conference that police had talked to a witness who had seen Archambeau and Bruguier get into a vehicle headed east on Route 281 shortly after the accident. It was not the only sighting of the two after their apparent disappearance; Bruguier had reportedly been seen January 20 in Wagner. "We've not ruled out foul play, but we haven't ruled out other theories" Whalen said. The two had not been placed on a national database of missing persons because authorities believed neither would have left the area.

In November, police announced some new developments. After the autopsies, evidence from those procedures (but not the bodies themselves) had been sent to a lab in New Mexico which, according to Youngstrom, found some results that differed from the autopsy, suggesting that while exposure was a possible cause of death it was not the only possibility. "I don't know if they're important differences or not", Youngstrom conceded. He was not yet considering the case a homicide investigation; he wanted most of all to know what happened. "Somebody out there knows something and I have to find that person." One of Bruguier's aunts said the Sioux were more certain: "I don't think anyone feels there wasn't foul play and that's very frightening for a community." Quintin Bruguier, Ruby's father, wanted to know so he could tell his granddaughter, whom he and his wife were in the process of adopting, what happened to her mother.

Two months later, police released more information. Youngstrom remained circumspect. "I can't say I'm going to go out and make an arrest tomorrow", he told the Sioux Falls Argus Leader. "All I'm saying is I can't rule it out yet." The New Mexico lab had found some additional evidence, but he could not elaborate on it. Youngstrom also revealed that several people had come to the sheriff's office saying that they had seen Archambeau and/or Bruguier after the accident and had taken polygraph tests. Youngstrom had also gone down to Nebraska to speak with some former Lake Andes residents. The families had increased the reward money offered to $5,000.

=== Unsolved Mysteries segment ===
Another cousin of Bruguier's, who lived in Sioux Falls, thought the case might be helped if the NBC series Unsolved Mysteries covered it. She got in touch with the producers and they agreed. In February 1995 they took a camera crew to Lake Andes, where police closed off a mile of Route 281 so a stunt driver could re-enact the accident at the site, with local actors playing the vehicle's occupants and first responders, including Youngstrom, playing themselves. At the time he said of the case:

We still don't have the three main questions answered that I want answered. How did they die, because they didn't die at the scene? Where were they at? How did they get back?"

The segment aired two months later. Dion recalled the accident and how Archambeau and Bruguier disappeared so quickly afterwards, without talking to her. Youngstrom revealed that he still had the keys found in Archambeau's pocket and had not yet found the door or vehicle locks that fit them.

Youngstrom and BIAP Dennis Simmons flew to California to take calls from viewers offering possible tips after the show. "I'm excited about getting started and following up," the former said. There were about 25–30; most of the promising ones had been from viewers in South Dakota, but some had come from Oklahoma and Wisconsin. "It was at a standstill and now we've got something to look forward to," said Simmons. One of the calls from outside Charles Mix County was someone who worked in the area and remembered seeing one of them; "He's supposed to come in this week."

In the wake of the segment, police revealed some further details from their own investigation. Among the sightings reported after the accident was one by a woman who knew Archambeau and said she had seen him on New Year's Eve; she had passed her polygraph test. Conversely, a couple who had been reported to have been in the backseat of the car that night denied having done so but failed their polygraphs. Youngstrom was also checking out a call from someone in North Dakota about two men seen near a "Blazer-type vehicle" at the accident site the morning the bodies were found.

=== FBI investigation ===
None of the leads generated by Unsolved Mysteries ultimately proved of any value in advancing the investigation. Later in the year, a lawsuit in federal court over the reservation boundaries (Note: The tribe challenged a landfill permit issued by the state on what it argued was within the reservation as not meeting federal standards; the state claimed that an 1894 act of Congress meant to encourage homesteading in the Western states by non-Indian settlers had removed all lands not allotted to Indians under the earlier Dawes Act from the reservation. In 1998 the U.S. Supreme Court held for the state.) resulted in a temporary injunction that denied state and local law enforcement any jurisdiction over the portion of Charles Mix County within the reservation. The FBI therefore took over the investigation of the deaths.

Four years later, the agency closed the case, unable to find any evidence that a crime had been committed. "There isn't any indication of anything else" beyond the fact of Archambeau and Bruguier's deaths, said Special Agent Matt Miller of the bureau's Sioux Falls field office. "All we know is that they appeared in the ditch and that was it."

=== Later years ===
Law enforcement has not actively investigated the case in the 21st century, but the sheriff at the time did not waver from his belief that questions remained unanswered. Upon his 2011 retirement, Westendorf told a local newspaper that the case was the most puzzling of his career. He recalled the horseback rider who had gone through the area in late January 1993 in search of his missing hubcap. With warmer weather, the depression between the road and railbed was largely bare and dry. He found neither his hubcap nor the bodies of Archambeau and Bruguier despite having passed through the area where they would be recovered a little over a month later.

"I believe they were placed in the ditch after they passed away someplace else," Westendorf maintained. "I do know that they weren't there in January. It's pretty hard to prove somebody was murdered when you don't have any evidence to prove it."

In 2019, Beresford author Christine Mager Wevik, inspired by the unrelated case of two missing teenage girls from Vermillion, wrote a book, Someone Knows, about the state's cold cases. Among them were the deaths of Archambeau and Bruguier.

== See also ==
- Deaths in 1993
- List of solved missing person cases: 1950–1999
- List of unsolved deaths
- List of Unsolved Mysteries episodes
- Death of Alonzo Brooks, 2004 case of a Kansas man's body found a month after his disappearance; cause of death has not been determined
- Killing of Judy Smith, remains of a Boston-area woman found on a mountainside in North Carolina in 1997, five months after last being seen alive at a Philadelphia hotel.

Other people who disappeared in circumstances involving car accidents:

- Patricia Meehan, last seen in Montana after a 1989 wreck; also profiled on Unsolved Mysteries
- Maura Murray, last seen after a 2004 one-car accident in New Hampshire.
- Brianna Maitland, last seen in 2004 after her abandoned car was discovered in Vermont.
