= Lake Andes Carnegie Library =

- U.S. National Register of Historic Places
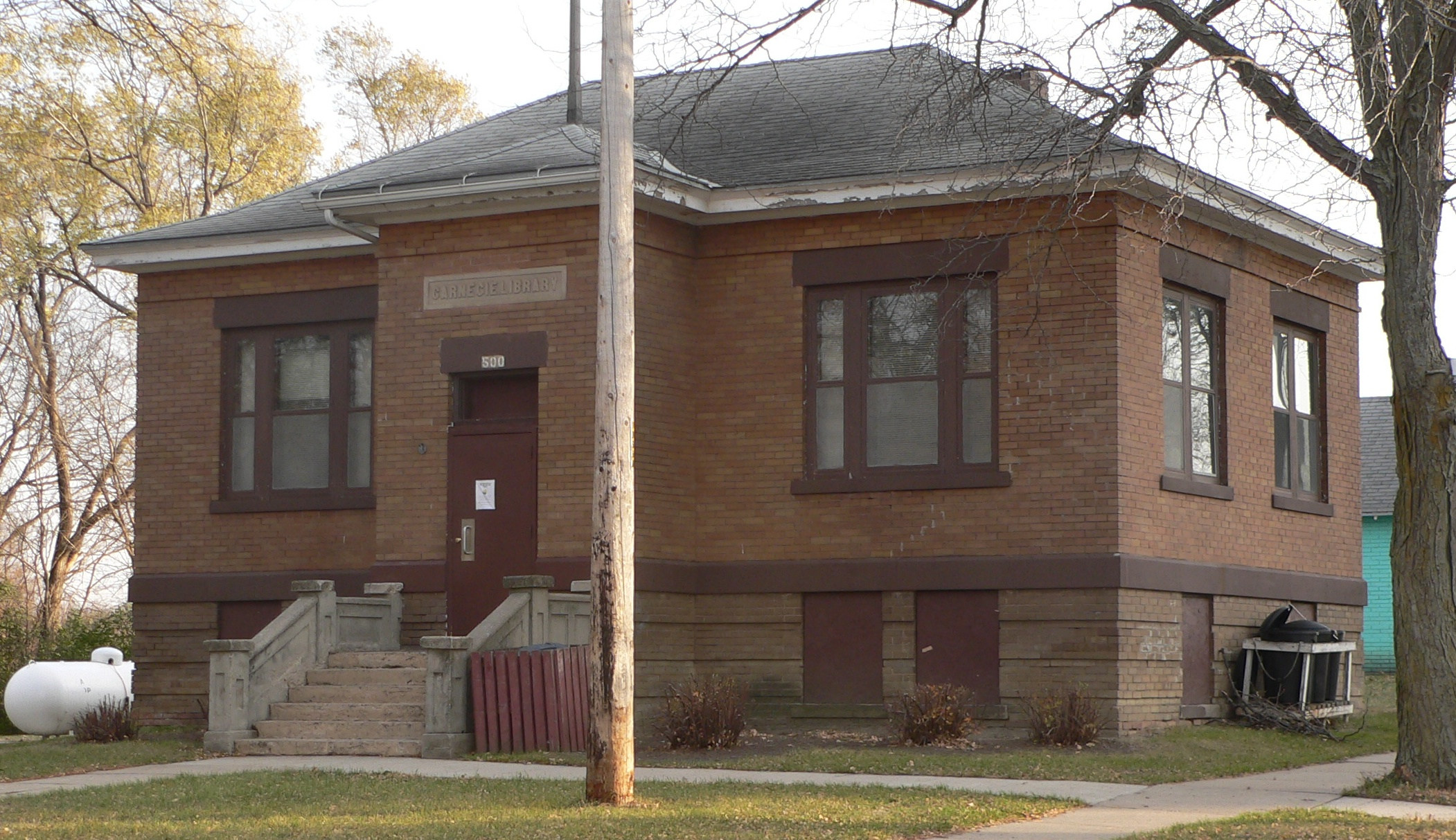
- Library in 2011

- Location within South Dakota
- Location: 500 Main St., Lake Andes, South Dakota
- Coordinates: 43.15590°N 98.53865°W
- Area: less than one acre
- Built: 1911
- Architectural style: Prairie School
- NRHP reference No.: 00000598
- Added to NRHP: June 2, 2000

The Lake Andes Carnegie Library, in Lake Andes, South Dakota in Charles Mix County, South Dakota, is a Carnegie library which was built in 1911. It was listed on the National Register of Historic Places in 2000.

The library is Prairie School in design, while the Charles Mix County Courthouse, also in Lake Andes, is the only Prairie School-style courthouse in the state.

The library was deemed significant "for its association with the Carnegie Library grants in South Dakota" and also for its simplified Prairie style, a style that was only 3% of the overall styles used for Carnegie Libraries."

There were 25 Carnegie libraries built in South Dakota. The Carnegie corporation gifted the Lake Andes library with $5000 toward the construction and foundation of the library. In 2017, Lake Andes librarian Mary Jo Parker was named South Dakota New Librarian of the Year, due to her work increasing children's programming at the library.

In 2022, it remains the public library of the town. The library has received grants from a number of organizations, including the South Dakota State Library, and the Bill and Melinda Gates Foundation.
