= Jennifer Fairgate case =

Unidentified woman found dead in Oslo Plaza in 1995

Unidentified decedent Jennifer Fairgate
- Status: Unidentified for 31 years, 3 months and 26 days
- Died: Oslo, Norway
- Cause of death: Gunshot
- Body discovered: 3 June 1995
- Other name: Jennifer Fergate

In May 1995, a woman using the alias Jennifer Fairgate (and misspelt as Jennifier Fergate) checked into Oslo's Plaza Hotel (now the Radisson Blu Plaza). Seventy hours later, she was found dead in her room with a 9mm pistol in her hand and a gunshot wound to the head. Authorities ruled her death as a suicide.

Her death sparked speculation across social media and inspired documentaries, many veering into conspiracy but despite exhaustive investigations, her identity remains unknown, and the case closed.

== Background ==
On 31 May 1995, at approximately 22:40, a woman registered at the Oslo Plaza Hotel under the name Jennifer Fairgate, although she misspelled the alias twice on hotel forms as "Fergate". She claimed to be 21 years old, provided a false address in Verlaine, Belgium and stated that a man named Lois Fairgate would accompany her. Despite hotel procedures, she was not asked for identification, or to provide a credit card, during registration.

Fairgate was described as elegant, well-dressed and composed. Witnesses reported that she spoke fluent English and German with no discernible accent.

Fairgate was assigned room 2805 on the 28th floor, and her behaviour throughout her stay was inconspicuous, with minimal interaction with hotel staff. During her stay, she consumed three soft drinks and a bag of potato crisps from the minibar.

After checking into room 2805 with a key card at 22:44 31 May, the key card was used again to check into the room at 00:21 and again at 08:34 1 June. On the afternoon of 1 June, maids came into the room to find it empty. The extra comforter placed in the room on 31 May for "Lois" was found unused and stashed away by the maids.

A key card was used to enter the room at 08:50 2 June and again at 11:03 that same day, implying that Jennifer was absent from the room for 20–24 hours since Thursday morning. That same morning, Jennifer extended her stay to Sunday and was given two new key cards. No credit card or ID was collected from her. After this point, the "do not disturb" sign hung on the door. On the evening of 2 June 1995, Fairgate attempted two international calls from her hotel room to Belgium. The numbers differed by one digit, and were directed to the Seraing and Grâce-Hollogne areas, consistent with the location she gave when she checked-in. The calls did not connect, and no recipient was identified.

Fairgate was last seen alive by a hotel worker who brought her room service on the evening of 2 June. She gave a large tip of kr 50 (approximately US$8 in 1995, equivalent to $17 in 2025). Later that evening, someone in the room acknowledged a message sent through the hotel's television, asking Fairgate to contact the hotel's front desk; Fairgate did not contact the front desk and the following evening (3 June) the hotel sent another message, which was also acknowledged.

Shortly after this acknowledgement, a security guard was sent to the room. He knocked on the door and heard a gunshot. He left the area unattended to fetch the head of hotel security, who entered the room fifteen minutes after the guard heard the gunshot and discovered Fairgate's body. The door had been double-locked from the inside, with no signs of forced entry and both key cards were in the room. The extra comforter originally for "Lois" was unraveled on the bed and appeared messy.

== Discovery of the body ==
Fairgate's body was discovered lying on the bed, with a gunshot wound to the forehead and a 9mm Browning pistol in her right hand. She was still holding the weapon, with her thumb on the trigger and her other fingers clasped around the rear of the grip, and her hand was resting on her chest.

The crime scene report states:

The right thumb of the corpse lay against the trigger, which was thus held in the posterior/fired position. When the weapon was released from the corpse’s hand, a ‘click’ could be heard as the trigger moved towards the forward position. Blood spatter was found on the pillow, telephone, bedside table, and the wall extending up to the ceiling.

She was dressed entirely in black: a long blouse, bra, silk tap pants, stockings, and Italian-made heeled shoes. On her right middle finger, she wore a gold ring; on her left wrist, a Citizen Aqualand diving watch, model CQ-1021-50, which had its batteries replaced in March 1995. The Browning pistol had its serial number partially removed, denying traceability. A black Braun Büffel attaché case in the room contained 25 rounds of 9mm ammunition, with a further seven rounds in the pistol's magazine.

In the room was a nearly empty bottle of men's Ungaro Pour L’Homme I, cologne, and a turquoise-green travel bag from the German manufacturer TraveLite, containing three bras, tights and a top. A sleeveless blouse, grey coat and a women's blazer from the German manufacturer René Lezard were hung in the room's wardrobe, with a cotton jumper and a long, black leather jacket placed on the luggage shelf. All clothing labels had been removed except for one on the blazer. Notably, there was an absence of clothing for the lower half of the body, with no skirts, leggings or trousers, and only the underwear she was wearing.

Amongst the items on the desk was a plastic newspaper bag containing an edition of USA Today, addressed to room 2816, located on the opposite end of the hallway from 2805. Investigators also found a fingerprint on the bag, which they were unable to identify. No identification documents such as a passport or wallet, nor any personal items like a toothbrush, toiletries or keys, were recovered.

== Investigation ==
Investigators determined that two shots had been fired and two spent cartridge casings were recovered. In addition to the fatal head wound, a second bullet passed through a pillow and bedding before embedding in the floor without striking the victim. The same pillow was then turned over and was beneath the victim's head when the fatal shot was fired. The gunshot wound to her forehead indicated a close-range shot, with the bullet's trajectory showing it was fired while she was lying on her back.

Samples from the skin of both hands revealed no trace of gunshot residue, blood spatter or singeing, and there were no defensive wounds.

The deceased was estimated to have been between 21 and 35 years of age, a white female of European descent, approximately 159 cm (5 ft 2 1/2 in) tall and weighing an estimated 67 kg (148 lb). She had short black hair, possibly dyed, and blue eyes. No distinguishing marks or unique physical features were recorded. She had relatively expensive dental work, consistent with practices found in the United States, Switzerland, and Germany. Toxicology showed no alcohol in her blood, but no tests were conducted for drugs. Fingerprints and a DNA profile were obtained post-mortem, but no matches were found in police databases.

== Theories ==
From the outset, investigators faced significant challenges in determining Jennifer Fairgate's identity and unravelling the events leading to her death. The absence of personal effects, her fabricated address, the removal of identifying labels, and the pistol's illegible serial number have all fuelled speculation about her identity and the circumstances surrounding her death.

Due to the lack of evidence of a struggle, her room door being double-locked from the inside with no sign of forced entry, and the discovery of the pistol in her hand, Norwegian police ruled Jennifer Fairgate's death a suicide with "99.9% certainty". However, the absence of gunshot residue or blood on her hands, the pistol's "awkward" placement, and the extra ammunition have led to questioning of this conclusion.

Others argue that external parties may have staged the scene to appear as a suicide, and suggest she was killed by someone she knew. Hotel records show she registered a guest under the name Lois Fairgate. However, he never surfaced during investigations, and only her fingerprints were found on the pistol and cartridges.

Fairgate's use of an alias and possession of a tactical watch, associated with military use, has also fuelled speculation of espionage. Norwegian intelligence officer Ola Kaldager told Unsolved Mysteries that the removal of clothing tags and her language fluency were consistent with intelligence tradecraft. Others suspect Norway's E 14 security service, noting her check-in without ID, a guard leaving after hearing a gunshot, and the swift suicide ruling.

Each theory faces strong counterarguments: homicide lacks evidence of another person, and espionage is undermined by the absence of documents or leaks. A plausible scenario for the weapon's mutilated serial number is that it was acquired through the black market, rather than a spy "ghost gun", and language fluency is common in Europe. Without concrete evidence, the case remains with the formal verdict of suicide.

== Burial and exhumation ==
The body of the woman remained in police custody for a year. In June 1996, she was interred in an unmarked pauper's grave at Vestre Gravlund cemetery in Oslo, without any funeral rites, headstone, or mourners. The burial was conducted with a simple coffin and by municipal pallbearers.

In accordance with routine procedures, much of the case evidence, including personal clothing, the hotel bedspread, and key forensic materials, was disposed of or destroyed after her burial. Jewelry and other valuables were reportedly sold at a police auction.

In November 2016, following renewed interest in the case sparked by investigative reporting, Norwegian authorities exhumed the woman's remains to conduct further forensic analysis. Samples of teeth and bone were taken, allowing for mitochondrial genetic testing and isotope analysis, including strontium and carbon-14 analysis. Investigators were able to construct a nearly complete DNA profile. The results indicated she was likely of European descent; strontium levels in her teeth suggested she had grown up in Germany, while carbon-14 analysis estimated her birth year as around 1971, making her approximately 24 years old at the time of death.

== In media ==
Fairgate's story gained international attention after the 2020 Netflix episode of Unsolved Mysteries, Death in Oslo. The episode sparked renewed interest among amateur sleuths, prompting widespread speculation across forums, blogs, and podcasts, which offer little beyond recycled theories and unverified claims.

Descriptions, artistic and photographic reconstructions have been publicised, and investigators have focused on her reported hometown of Verlaine, all without success. No credible individual has come forward to identify the unnamed woman known as "Jennifer Fairgate", and the case remains closed, officially considered a suicide.

== See also ==
- 1995 in Norway
- Isdal Woman
- Unidentified decedent
- Operation Identify Me
