= Unsolved Mysteries season 16 =

Season of television series

Unsolved Mysteries
- Season 16
- Promotional poster
- No. of episodes: 9

Release
- Original network: Netflix
- Original release: October 18 – November 1, 2022

Season chronology
- ← Previous; Season 15 Next → Season 17

The sixteenth season of Unsolved Mysteries is billed as the third volume of the Netflix reboot of the long-running American television series, created by John Cosgrove and Terry Dunn Meurer. The show, which documents and seeks to solve cold cases and paranormal phenomena, originally ran from 1987–2010.

Like the previous season released by Netflix, there is no host or narrator. However, an image of longtime host Robert Stack is shown in the title sequence of each episode.

== Background ==
On September 6, 2022, Netflix announced that a new season, serving as the third volume of their reboot of the series, would consist of nine new episodes and that it would be released in batches, three episodes a week, billed as a "three-night event". These batches would begin streaming on October 18, October 25, and November 1, 2022, respectively.

== Episodes ==
No. overall	No. in season	Mystery	Directed by	Original release date
Volume 3
594	1	Mystery at Mile Marker 45	Skye Borgman	October 18, 2022
The case of Tiffany Valiante, who was struck by a train near Mays Landing, New Jersey is the focus of this episode.
595	2	Something in the Sky	Gabe Torres	October 18, 2022
In March 1994, unexplained lights over western Michigan are recalled.
596	3	Body in Bags	Donnie Eichar	October 18, 2022
The murder of David Carter in Melvindale, Michigan. His then girlfriend, Tammy Williams is a wanted fugitive.
597	4	Death in a Vegas Motel	Skye Borgman	October 25, 2022
The circumstances surrounding the death of James Barrier are explored.
598	5	Paranormal Rangers	Clay Jeter	October 25, 2022
Navajo Rangers who explore paranormal activity are subject of this episode.
599	6	What Happened to Josh?	Gabe Torres	October 25, 2022
The disappearance of Joshua Guimond is discussed.
600	7	Body in the Bay	Robert M. Wise	November 1, 2022
Questions surround the death of Pat Mullins in Bradenton, Florida. Was it suicide or murder?
601	8	The Ghost in Apartment 14	Clay Jeter	November 1, 2022
A woman and her daughter move into a new apartment and begin witnessing paranormal activity. They later find out that a woman who lived in the apartment has been missing, Marie Elizabeth Spannhake, which is linked to the kidnapping of Colleen Stan.
602	9	Abducted by a Parent	Joie Jacoby	November 1, 2022
Two cases about parents who kidnapped their own children: Amina and Belel Kandil from Williamsburg, Virginia and Aziz Khan from Atlanta. Note: Aziz Khan was found in 2025.

== Solved cases ==
=== Kayla Unbehaun ===
An Unsolved Mysteries viewer identified missing child Kayla Unbehaun after watching the episode "Abducted by a Parent". Kayla's mother was taken into custody and she was reunited with her father.

=== Aziz Khan ===
Aziz was found by Douglas County Sheriff's deputies in a car parked along the driveway of a residence being investigated for trespassing. He has since been taken into protective custody.
