= Fontana, Kansas =

- City
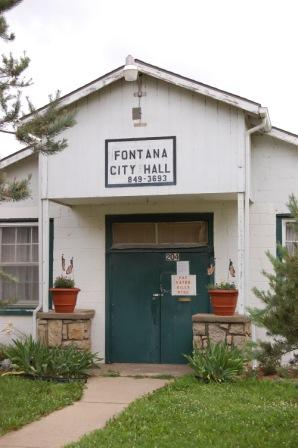
- Fontana City Hall (2008)

- Location within Miami County and Kansas

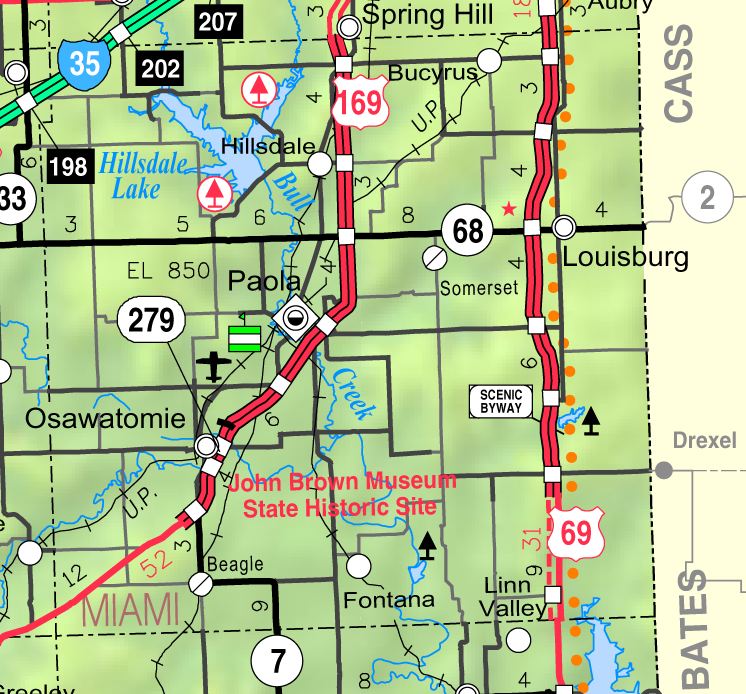
- KDOT map of Miami County (legend)
- Coordinates: 38°25′26″N 94°50′39″W
- Country: United States
- State: Kansas
- County: Miami
- Incorporated: 1889

Area
  - Total: 0.84 sq mi (2.17 km^{2})
  - Land: 0.84 sq mi (2.17 km^{2})
  - Water: 0.0039 sq mi (0.01 km^{2})
- Elevation: 899 ft (274 m)

Population (2020)
  - Total: 210
  - Density: 250/sq mi (97/km^{2})
- Time zone: UTC-6 (CST)
  - Summer (DST): UTC-5 (CDT)
- ZIP Code: 66026
- Area code: 913
- FIPS code: 20-23650
- GNIS ID: 2394782
- Website: City Info

Fontana is a city in south central Miami County, Kansas, United States, and is part of the Kansas City metropolitan area. As of the 2020 census, the population of the city was 210. The name Fontana comes from the French word fontaine, meaning fountain or a spring-like water source. It was given to the small city from a spring near the town site.

== History ==
Captain David Martin, a veteran of the War of 1812, received a land grant for 160 acres (0.65 km^{2}) in Lykins County, Kansas (Miami County, Kansas) due to an 1855 congressional act. Part of this property would eventually become the townsite and rural community of Fontana. J.B. Grinnell purchased 120 acres (0.49 km^{2}) of the property in 1869, and put Fontana in the center near a railroad right of way. The city was incorporated in 1889.

== Geography ==
Fontana has a total area of 0.84 square miles (2.18 km^{2}), all land.

== Demographics ==
Historical population
Census	Pop.	Note	%±
1880	174		—
1890	256		47.1%
1900	237		−7.4%
1910	246		3.8%
1920	206		−16.3%
1930	187		−9.2%
1940	174		−7.0%
1950	168		−3.4%
1960	138		−17.9%
1970	160		15.9%
1980	173		8.1%
1990	131		−24.3%
2000	149		13.7%
2010	224		50.3%
2020	210		−6.2%
U.S. Decennial Census

=== 2020 census ===
The 2020 United States census counted 210 people, 71 households, and 49 families in Fontana. The population density was 250.9 per square mile (96.9/km^{2}). There were 86 housing units at an average density of 102.7 per square mile (39.7/km^{2}). The racial makeup was 92.38% (194) white or European American (91.43% non-Hispanic white), 0.0% (0) black or African-American, 0.0% (0) Native American or Alaska Native, 0.0% (0) Asian, 0.0% (0) Pacific Islander or Native Hawaiian, 1.43% (3) from other races, and 6.19% (13) from two or more races. Hispanic or Latino of any race was 3.33% (7) of the population.

Of the 71 households, 39.4% had children under the age of 18; 54.9% were married couples living together; 19.7% had a female householder with no spouse or partner present. 21.1% of households consisted of individuals and 14.1% had someone living alone who was 65 years of age or older. The average household size was 3.6 and the average family size was 3.8. The percent of those with a bachelor's degree or higher was estimated to be 7.1% of the population.

24.3% of the population was under the age of 18, 6.7% from 18 to 24, 34.3% from 25 to 44, 21.9% from 45 to 64, and 12.9% who were 65 years of age or older. The median age was 35.6 years. For every 100 females, there were 92.7 males. For every 100 females ages 18 and older, there were 101.3 males.

The 2016–2020 5-year American Community Survey estimates show that the median household income was $65,357 (with a margin of error of +/− $12,571) and the median family income was $65,673 (+/− $15,224). Males had a median income of $64,167 (+/− $28,776) versus $24,779 (+/− $4,325) for females. The median income for those above 16 years old was $32,135 (+/− $7,502). Approximately, 20.5% of families and 20.4% of the population were below the poverty line, including 19.1% of those under the age of 18 and 12.9% of those ages 65 or over.

=== 2010 census ===
As of the census of 2010, there were 224 people, 72 households, and 55 families residing in the city. The population density was 266.7 inhabitants per square mile (103.0/km^{2}). There were 84 housing units at an average density of 100.0 per square mile (38.6/km^{2}). The racial makeup of the city was 92.9% White, 0.4% African American, 0.4% Native American, 0.4% Asian, 2.7% from other races, and 3.1% from two or more races. Hispanic or Latino of any race were 6.7% of the population.

There were 72 households, of which 48.6% had children under the age of 18 living with them, 56.9% were married couples living together, 13.9% had a female householder with no husband present, 5.6% had a male householder with no wife present, and 23.6% were non-families. 19.4% of all households were made up of individuals, and 9.8% had someone living alone who was 65 years of age or older. The average household size was 3.11 and the average family size was 3.42.

The median age in the city was 32.2 years. 31.7% of residents were under the age of 18; 11.6% were between the ages of 18 and 24; 27.2% were from 25 to 44; 21.9% were from 45 to 64; and 7.6% were 65 years of age or older. The gender makeup of the city was 50.9% male and 49.1% female.

=== 2000 census ===
As of the census of 2000, there were 149 people, 61 households, and 46 families residing in the city. The population density was 854.6 inhabitants per square mile (330.0/km^{2}). There were 67 housing units at an average density of 384.3 per square mile (148.4/km^{2}). The racial makeup of the city was 97.32% White, 0.67% Native American, 0.67% from other races, and 1.34% from two or more races. Hispanic or Latino of any race were 2.01% of the population.

There were 61 households, out of which 21.3% had children under the age of 18 living with them, 65.6% were married couples living together, 9.8% had a female householder with no husband present, and 23.0% were non-families. 18.0% of all households were made up of individuals, and 13.1% had someone living alone who was 65 years of age or older. The average household size was 2.44 and the average family size was 2.72.

In the city, the population was spread out, with 20.8% under the age of 18, 10.7% from 18 to 24, 22.1% from 25 to 44, 28.2% from 45 to 64, and 18.1% who were 65 years of age or older. The median age was 43 years. For every 100 females, there were 79.5 males. For every 100 females age 18 and over, there were 90.3 males.

The median income for a household in the city was $29,375, and the median income for a family was $32,083. Males had a median income of $26,875 versus $13,000 for females. The per capita income for the city was $13,484. There were 5.4% of families and 12.7% of the population living below the poverty line, including 7.4% of under eighteens and 22.2% of those over 64.

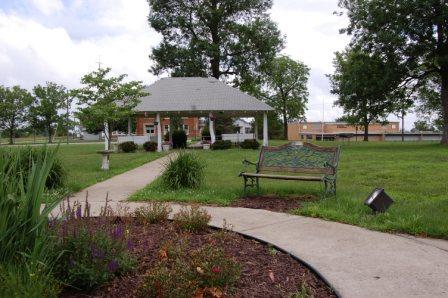
Fontana Park (2008)

== Economy ==
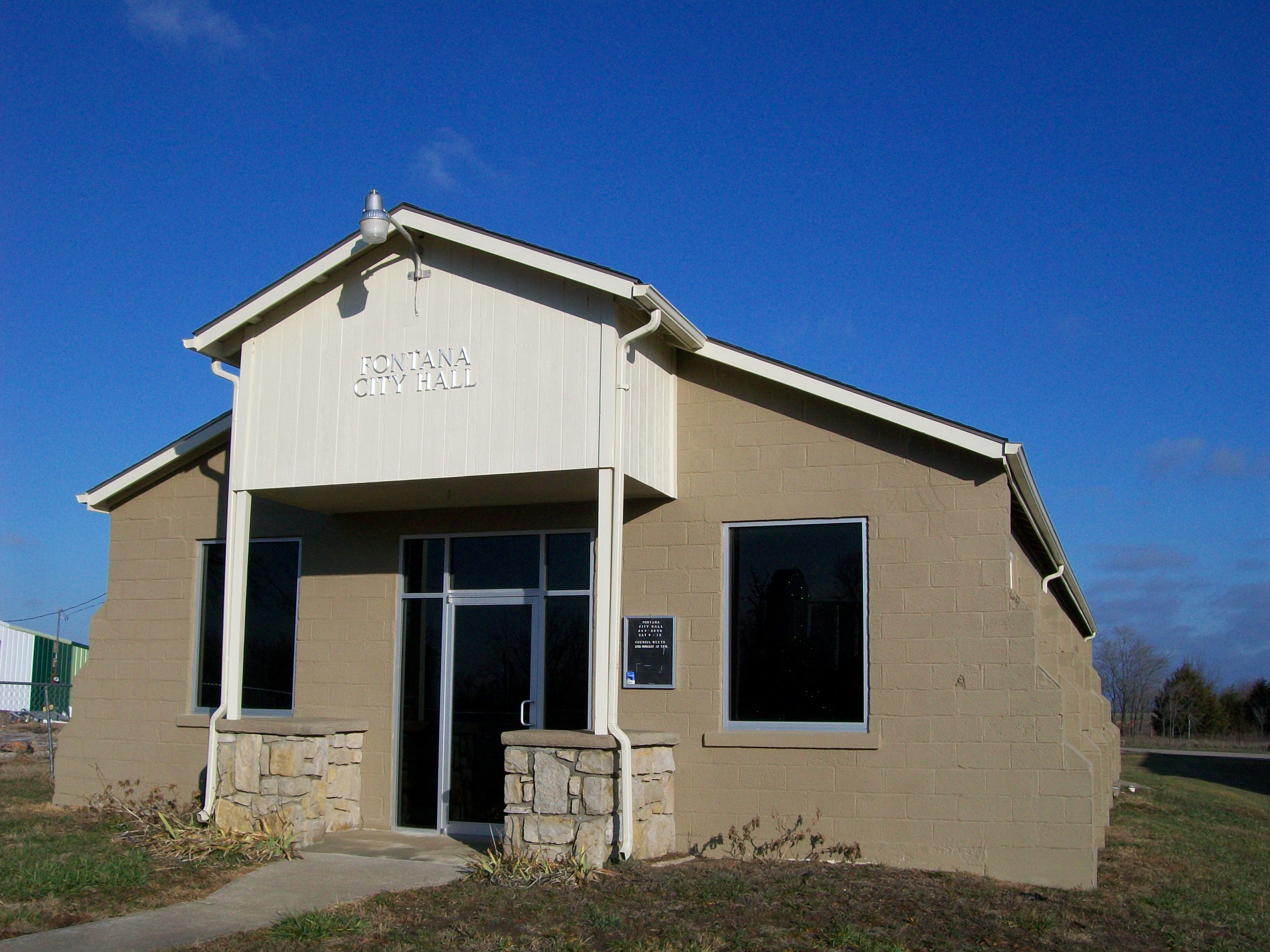
Newly renovated city hall (2011)

With a farm-based economy, the Fontana Co-Op is of great importance to the area farmers.

== Education ==
The community is served by Prairie View USD 362 public school district. Students from grades 6–12 attend Prairie View Middle School or Prairie View High School in La Cygne.

Previously, Fontana Elementary was located in Fontana, having a total enrollment of approximately 100 students from kindergarten through fifth grades. In approximately 2011, the Prairie View School Board expressed an interest in replacing or remodeling Fontana Elementary. Various proposals were made, including one to build a new school close to Prairie View Middle School, but the Board eventually settled on a decision to expand nearby Parker Elementary, which was part of Prairie View along with Fontana. The school ceased operations in May 2014, with the end of the school year, and all the students were moved to Parker Elementary. The school building has since been sold to private owners.
