= James Jones (South Dakota politician) =

American politician

James H. "Jack" Jones (January 16, 1927 – May 21, 2014) was an American politician.

Born in Geddes, South Dakota, Jones moved with his family to Miller, South Dakota, where he graduated from Miller High School. He served in the United States Army Air Forces. In 1950, Jones graduated from the South Dakota State University College of Pharmacy. He worked in his family's business Jones Drug in Miller, South Dakota. He served on the Miller City Council and as mayor. Jones also served in the South Dakota House of Representatives as a Republican in 1987. He died in Miller, South Dakota.
