= Death of Alonzo Brooks =

2004 death in Kansas, US

- Date: May 1, 2004; 22 years ago (aged 23)
- Location: La Cygne, Kansas, U.S.
- Cause: Homicide; ongoing investigation
- Inquiries: FBI, KBI, Linn County Police Department

On May 1, 2004, the body of Alonzo Brooks was found in La Cygne, Kansas, about a month after he was reported missing after April 3, 2004.

== Background ==
Alonzo Tyree Brooks was born on May 19, 1980, to Billy Brooks Sr. and Maria Ramirez. A native of Topeka, Kansas, Brooks was of African American and Mexican descent. At the time of his disappearance, he was 23 years old and working as a custodian for Countryside Maintenance in Gardner, Kansas.

=== Disappearance ===
On April 3, 2004, Brooks traveled with three friends to a party in La Cygne, approximately 50 miles (80 km) south of Gardner. While at the party, racial slurs were allegedly uttered toward Brooks, possibly igniting tension between Brooks and the other individuals. As the party continued, Brooks's friends left the party at La Cygne at different times, accidentally leaving Brooks behind due to a perceived misunderstanding on how he would be getting a ride home to Gardner. The next day Brooks did not return to Gardner and was deemed to be missing.

=== Investigation ===
Following the night of the party, the Brooks family traveled to La Cygne to search for their son and contact the local authorities. Eventually, the Linn County Sheriffs Office turned the case over to the Kansas Bureau of Investigation after failing to locate Brooks. Both the KBI and FBI were unsuccessful in locating Brooks.

On May 1, 2004, the Brooks family was allowed to search the property for their son. On the first day of the search effort, Brooks' body was found on the banks of Middle Creek adjacent to the house where he was last seen a month earlier. Postmortem examination indicated that Brooks did not have any broken bones, any signs of blunt force trauma or injury, nor any of the biological signs of drowning in his lungs. Consequently, the pathologist could not determine a cause of death.

On June 11, 2020, the FBI reopened the cold case and issued a $100,000 reward for information related to Brooks' death.

== FBI investigation ==
Brooks's body was exhumed in July 2020 and transported to Dover Air Force Base for an autopsy and further investigation by the Armed Forces Medical Examiner. The examiner concluded in their report that Brooks's death was due to homicide.

Acting U.S. Attorney Duston Slinkard stated that while the Federal Bureau of Investigation (FBI) knew that Brooks died under very suspicious circumstances, the autopsy ultimately proved that his death was not an accident. Additionally, Slinkard stated that the FBI is doing everything that they can and that they will spare no resources in order to bring justice to those who were responsible for Brooks' death. In the autopsy, examiners stated that there were injuries that would not be consistent with decomposition.

== Media ==
On July 1, 2020, Brooks' death was featured in the fourth episode "No Ride Home" of the fifteenth season of Unsolved Mysteries TV series. On November 16, 2020, Unsolved Mysteries stated the FBI had learned of a second party in La Cygne the night Brooks disappeared. Attendees left the party after a fight broke out, then headed to the farmhouse where Brooks was last seen.

== See also ==
- Lists of solved missing person cases
- List of unsolved deaths
- Deaths of Arnold Archambeau and Ruby Bruguier, South Dakota couple's bodies found in 1993 near where they had disappeared from following a car accident three months earlier; cause of death determined to be exposure but police believe they died elsewhere and the bodies were moved back there.
