= Unsolved Mysteries season 17 =

Season of television series

Unsolved Mysteries
- Season 17
- Promotional poster
- No. of episodes: 9

Release
- Original network: Netflix
- Original release: July 31 – October 2, 2024

Season chronology
- ← Previous; Season 16

The seventeenth season of Unsolved Mysteries, billed as Volume 4 and Volume 5, is part of a reboot of the long-running American television series, created by John Cosgrove and Terry Dunn Meurer. Volume 4 premiered on Netflix July 31, 2024. It consists of 5 episodes.

Like the previous seasons released by Netflix, there is no host or narrator. However, an image of longtime host Robert Stack is shown in the title sequence of each episode. A fifth volume, consisting of an additional four episodes, was announced on July 31, 2024 and premiered October 2, 2024.

== Background ==
In February 2024, it was announced that a fourth volume would begin streaming in 2024. It was later confirmed in June that the fourth volume would begin streaming in July 2024. In an interview for the new season, show creator Terry Dunn Meurer stated that they didn't want to focus solely on true crime, but also the paranormal. The new season features what is dubbed a "a classic throwback episode" entitled "The Mothman Revisited". The show originally documented the case in 2002.

== Episodes ==
No. overall	No. in season	Mystery	Directed by	Original release date
Volume 4
603	1	Who Was Jack the Ripper?	Robert M. Wise	July 31, 2024
A fresh look at 19th-century London serial killer Jack the Ripper.
604	2	Body in the Basement	Gabe Torres	July 31, 2024
On Oct. 26, 2015, Calgary resident Lee Antoni returned home after spending a weekend with his mother in Saskatchewan. His wife Amanda had been too ill to join him on the trip. Lee returned home and found his wife Amanda's body lying dead on the basement floor. The death was ruled accidental but suspicion still lingers.
605	3	The Severed Head	Skye Borgman	July 31, 2024
An unidentified severed head is found in Economy, Pennsylvania.
606	4	Murder, Center Stage	Robert M. Wise	July 31, 2024
The 1977 unsolved murder of 25-year-old graduate student Sigrid Stevenson is detailed. Stevenson was found dead on the stage of Kendall Hall's theater at Trenton State College.
607	5	The Mothman Revisited	Gabe Torres	July 31, 2024
People share tales of their encounters with the creature known as Mothman.
Volume 5
608	6	Park Bench Murders	Skye Borgman	October 2, 2024
Two friends are found shot dead in a park in the Cleveland Metroparks' Rocky River Reservation.
609	7	My Paranormal Partner	Robert M. Wise	October 2, 2024
Paranormal researcher Don Philips is profiled.
610	8	Mysterious Mutilations	Robert M. Wise	October 2, 2024
The strange phenomenon of mutilated cattle is detailed. In each instance, there were no footprints, no indication that the cattle had been attacked by another animal, and no blood.
611	9	The Roswell UFO Incident	Gabe Torres	October 2, 2024
New information comes to light on the Roswell incident.
