= La Cygne, Kansas =

- City
- Location within Linn County and Kansas

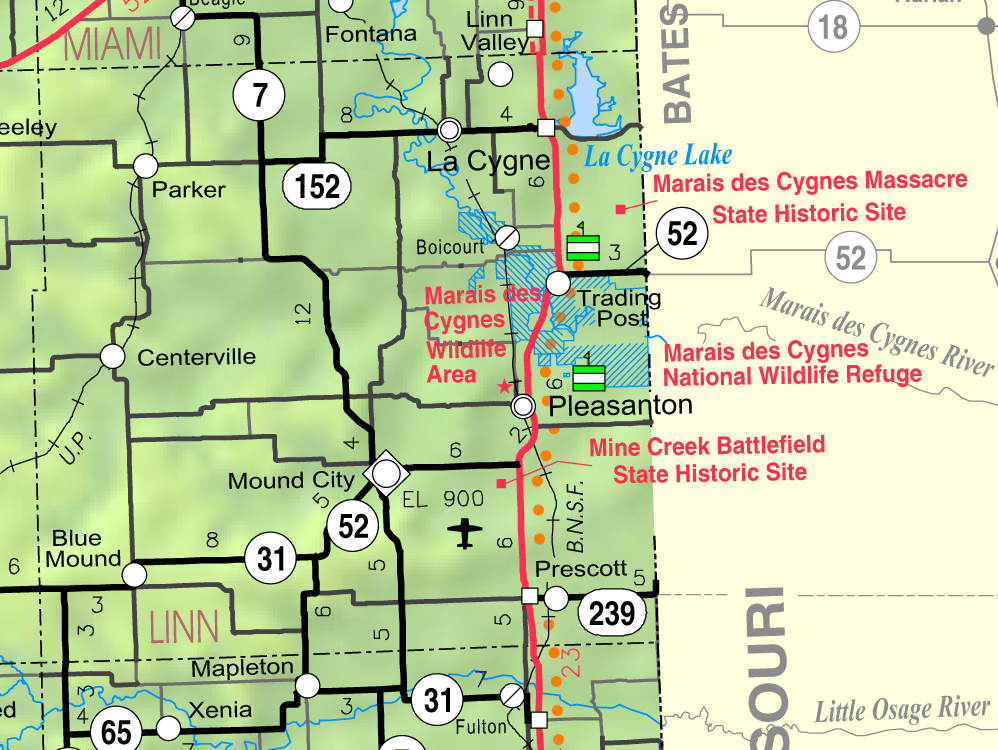
- KDOT map of Linn County (legend)
- Coordinates: 38°20′49″N 94°45′44″W
- Country: United States
- State: Kansas
- County: Linn
- Founded: 1869
- Incorporated: 1870
- Named for: Marais des Cygnes River

Government
  - Type: Mayor–Council

Area
  - Total: 1.55 sq mi (4.01 km^{2})
  - Land: 1.53 sq mi (3.96 km^{2})
  - Water: 0.019 sq mi (0.05 km^{2})
- Elevation: 837 ft (255 m)

Population (2020)
  - Total: 1,050
  - Density: 687/sq mi (265/km^{2})
- Time zone: UTC-6 (CST)
  - Summer (DST): UTC-5 (CDT)
- ZIP Code: 66040
- Area code: 913
- FIPS code: 20-37575
- GNIS ID: 477688
- Website: cityoflacygne.org

La Cygne (pronounced /leɪ ˈsiːn/ lay SEEN) is a city in Linn County, Kansas, United States, and situated along the Marais des Cygnes River. As of the 2020 census, the population of the city was 1,050. The city is named after the Marais des Cygnes River which is a French translation of an Osage appellation meaning "marsh of the swans".

== History ==
La Cygne was founded in 1869 as soon as the people were assured of the building of a track for the Missouri River, Ft. Scott & Gulf Railroad. A town company was organized and purchased 1,400 acres (5.7 km^{2}) of land, but had only 140 acres (0.57 km^{2}) laid out as a town site. La Cygne was incorporated on January 14, 1870, and a board of trustees was appointed. In the fall of that year the town had grown so that it had inhabitants enough to organize as a city of the third class, and F. A. Foote was elected the first mayor. The first school was taught in 1869 in Cady's hall. It was a private subscription school and was kept open until 1870, when the public school house was built. It was a commodious two-story brick building containing the graded and high schools. The Methodist church organized in 1870 and soon after built a house of worship. The Presbyterian church was organized the same year but had no building for a year afterward.

At an early date La Cygne became a manufacturing point. A flour mill was built in 1870; a bank was started in 1871; the La Cygne organ factory was another early commercial enterprise, but it did not flourish. In 1881 a coal mine was opened, after which it became an important point for the industry. The first newspaper in the town was the Weekly Journal, which first appeared in June 1870.

The suspicious death of Alonzo Brooks in 2004 was featured in the fourth episode "No Ride Home" of the fifteenth season of Unsolved Mysteries TV series in 2020.

== Geography ==
La Cygne is situated on the east bank of the Marais des Cygnes River and only a few miles southwest of the city of Linn Valley. It is four miles (6 km) west of U.S. Route 69 on K-152; La Cygne Lake is east of US-69. A track for BNSF Railway passes through the city. According to the United States Census Bureau, the city has a total area of 1.53 square miles (3.96 km^{2}), of which 1.51 square miles (3.91 km^{2}) is land and 0.02 square miles (0.05 km^{2}) is water.

=== Climate ===
The climate in this area is characterized by hot, humid summers and generally mild to cool winters. According to the Köppen Climate Classification system, La Cygne has a humid subtropical climate, abbreviated "Cfa" on climate maps.

== Demographics ==
Historical population
| Census | Pop. | Note | %± |
|---|---|---|---|
| 1880 | 835 | | — |
| 1890 | 1,135 | | 35.9% |
| 1900 | 1,037 | | −8.6% |
| 1910 | 957 | | −7.7% |
| 1920 | 1,028 | | 7.4% |
| 1930 | 1,019 | | −0.9% |
| 1940 | 932 | | −8.5% |
| 1950 | 794 | | −14.8% |
| 1960 | 810 | | 2.0% |
| 1970 | 989 | | 22.1% |
| 1980 | 1,025 | | 3.6% |
| 1990 | 1,066 | | 4.0% |
| 2000 | 1,115 | | 4.6% |
| 2010 | 1,149 | | 3.0% |
| 2020 | 1,050 | | −8.6% |
U.S. Decennial Census

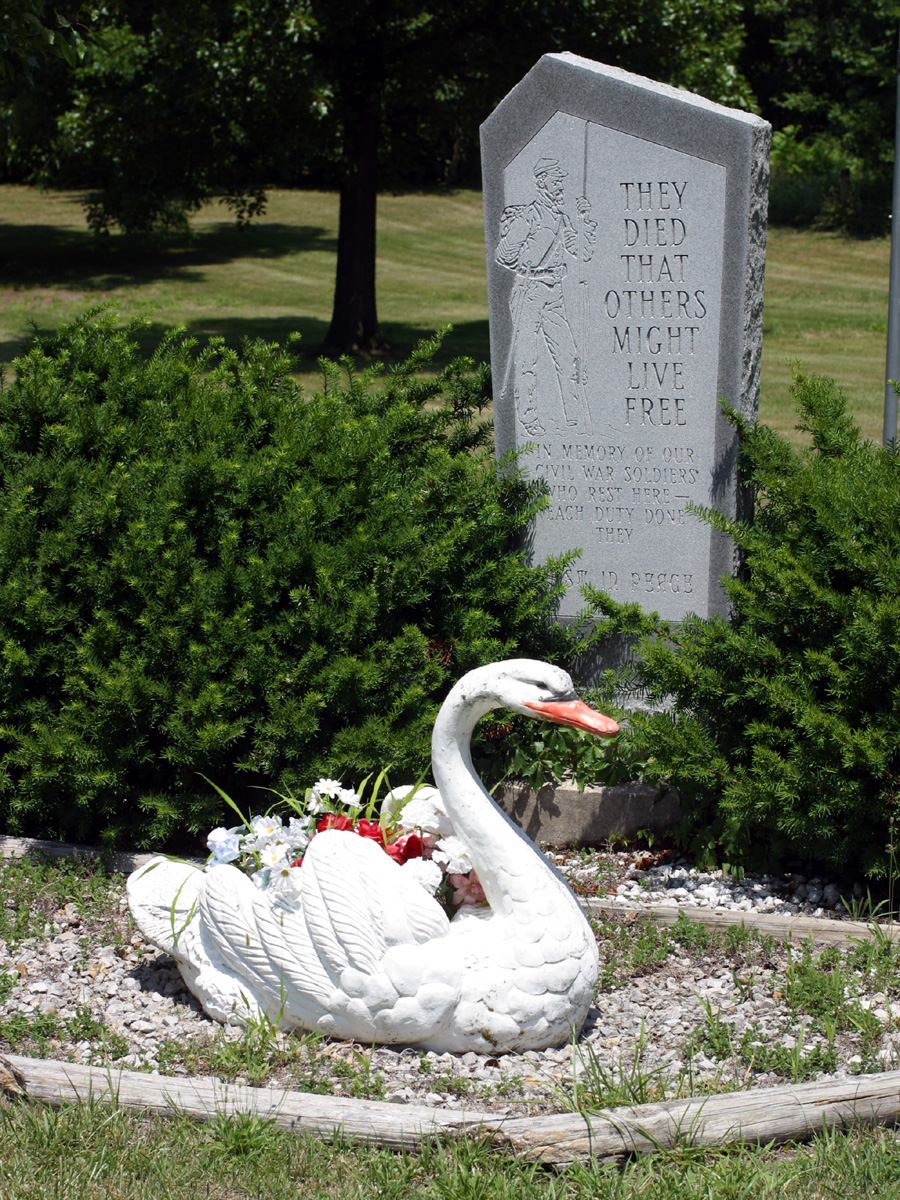
Oaklawn Cemetery memorial to Civil War soldiers. Numerous swans like this one can be found around the city (2006)

=== 2020 census ===
The 2020 United States census counted 1,050 people, 430 households, and 258 families in La Cygne. The population density was 687.2 per square mile (265.3/km^{2}). There were 502 housing units at an average density of 328.5 per square mile (126.8/km^{2}). The racial makeup was 93.14% (978) white or European American (90.48% non-Hispanic white), 0.67% (7) black or African-American, 0.67% (7) Native American or Alaska Native, 0.0% (0) Asian, 0.0% (0) Pacific Islander or Native Hawaiian, 0.29% (3) from other races, and 5.24% (55) from two or more races. Hispanic or Latino of any race was 4.0% (42) of the population.

Of the 430 households, 29.8% had children under the age of 18; 42.1% were married couples living together; 27.7% had a female householder with no spouse or partner present. 35.1% of households consisted of individuals and 16.3% had someone living alone who was 65 years of age or older. The average household size was 2.2 and the average family size was 2.5. The percent of those with a bachelor's degree or higher was estimated to be 5.3% of the population.

25.1% of the population was under the age of 18, 9.0% from 18 to 24, 23.7% from 25 to 44, 23.9% from 45 to 64, and 18.3% who were 65 years of age or older. The median age was 39.2 years. For every 100 females, there were 101.9 males. For every 100 females ages 18 and older, there were 99.5 males.

The 2016–2020 5-year American Community Survey estimates show that the median household income was $40,000 (with a margin of error of +/- $25,072) and the median family income was $52,411 (+/- $20,829). Males had a median income of $50,305 (+/- $19,069) versus $25,234 (+/- $12,507) for females. The median income for those above 16 years old was $31,994 (+/- $7,090). Approximately, 22.5% of families and 22.2% of the population were below the poverty line, including 10.7% of those under the age of 18 and 43.9% of those ages 65 or over.

=== 2010 census ===
As of the census of 2010, there were 1,149 people, 454 households, and 303 families residing in the city. The population density was 760.9 inhabitants per square mile (293.8/km^{2}). There were 517 housing units at an average density of 342.4 per square mile (132.2/km^{2}). The racial makeup of the city was 97.3% White, 0.6% African American, 0.9% Native American, 0.2% Asian, 0.1% from other races, and 1.0% from two or more races. Hispanic or Latino of any race were 1.7% of the population.

There were 454 households, of which 34.8% had children under the age of 18 living with them, 49.8% were married couples living together, 10.4% had a female householder with no husband present, 6.6% had a male householder with no wife present, and 33.3% were non-families. 29.3% of all households were made up of individuals, and 16.7% had someone living alone who was 65 years of age or older. The average household size was 2.53 and the average family size was 3.08.

The median age in the city was 37 years. 28.6% of residents were under the age of 18; 6.4% were between the ages of 18 and 24; 23.5% were from 25 to 44; 24.3% were from 45 to 64; and 17.1% were 65 years of age or older. The gender makeup of the city was 47.3% male and 52.7% female.

=== 2000 census ===
As of the 2000 United States census, there were 1,115 people, 459 households, and 294 families residing in the city. The population density was 800.4 inhabitants per square mile (309.0/km^{2}). There were 507 housing units at an average density of 363.9 per square mile (140.5/km^{2}). The racial makeup of the city was 96.68% White, 1.43% Native American, 0.27% Black or African American, 0.27% Asian, 0.27% from other races, and 1.08% from two or more races. Hispanic or Latino of any race were 0.72% of the population.

There were 459 households, out of which 31.8% had children under the age of 18 living with them, 53.4% were married couples living together, 7.4% had a female householder with no husband present, and 35.9% were non-families. 30.9% of all households were made up of individuals, and 18.1% had someone living alone who was 65 years of age or older. The average household size was 2.38 and the average family size was 3.00.

In the city, the population was spread out, with 26.3% under the age of 18, 6.8% from 18 to 24, 27.7% from 25 to 44, 21.8% from 45 to 64, and 17.4% who were 65 years of age or older. The median age was 37 years. For every 100 females, there were 89.0 males. For every 100 females age 18 and over, there were 83.1 males.

The median income for a household in the city was $34,479, and the median income for a family was $44,118. Males had a median income of $30,900 versus $19,803 for females. The per capita income for the city was $15,880. About 5.0% of families and 9.2% of the population were below the poverty line, including 4.9% of those under age 18 and 23.4% of those age 65 or over.

== Education ==
The community is served by Prairie View USD 362 public school district with four schools serving more than 1,000 students. The four schools located in the school district are:

- La Cygne Elementary School, grades PreK–5
- Parker Elementary School, grades PreK-5
- Prairie View Middle School, grades 6–8
- Prairie View High School, grades 9–12

The Prairie View High School mascot is Prairie View Buffalos. Prior to school unification, the La Cygne High School mascot was La Cygne Indians.

== Notable people ==
- Alonzo Brooks (1980–2004), victim of a suspected homicide. He was visiting from Gardner.
- Ezra Foot (1809–1885), first mayor of La Cygne and Wisconsin politician
- Rick James, Politician
- John Robinson (born 1943), serial killer, con man, embezzler, kidnapper, forger
