= Prairie View USD 362 =

Public school district in La Cygne, Kansas

Coordinates: 38.3438°N 94.8518°W

Address
- 13799 KS Hwy 152 La Cygne, Kansas, 66040; United States

District information
- Type: Public
- Grades: PK to 12
- Schools: 4
- NCES District ID: 2008250

Students and staff
- Students: 903 (2024–25)
- Teachers: 81.49 (on an FTE basis)
- Student–teacher ratio: 11.08

Other information
- Website: pv362.org

Prairie View USD 362 is a public unified school district headquartered in La Cygne, Kansas, United States. The district includes the communities of La Cygne, Cadmus, Centerville, Fontana, Linn Valley, Parker, and nearby rural areas.

== Schools ==
The school district operates the following schools:

- Prairie View High School, in La Cygne
- Prairie View Middle School, in La Cygne
- La Cygne Elementary, in La Cygne
- Parker Elementary, in Parker
- ~~Fontana Elementary, in Fontana~~ Consolidated with Parker Elementary in 2014

== Sports ==
Prairie View High School sports include baseball, boys' and girls' basketball, cross country, cheer and football, softball, track, volleyball and wrestling.

== See also ==
- List of unified school districts in Kansas
- List of high schools in Kansas
- Kansas State Department of Education
- Kansas State High School Activities Association
