= Unsolved Mysteries season 15 =

Season of television series

Unsolved Mysteries
- Season 15
- Promotional poster
- No. of episodes: 12

Release
- Original network: Netflix
- Original release: July 1 – October 19, 2020

Season chronology
- ← Previous; Season 14 Next → Season 16

The fifteenth season of Unsolved Mysteries is a Netflix reboot revival of the long-running American television series, created by John Cosgrove and Terry Dunn Meurer. The show, which documents and seeks to solve cold cases and paranormal phenomena, originally ran from 1987 to 2010.

Unlike all previous seasons, there is no host or narrator in the Netflix reboot. However, an image of longtime host Robert Stack is shown in the title sequence of each episode.

== Background ==
In 2017, the film and television distribution company FilmRise acquired worldwide digital distribution rights to the original run of Unsolved Mysteries. The company announced its intention to release updated versions of the show's episodes through multiple streaming platforms. This led to renewed interest in the series, with original creators, John Cosgrove and Terry Dunn Meurer, expressing interest in reviving the show. On January 18, 2019, Netflix announced that it had picked up a 12-part reboot of the series. It was further revealed that Stranger Things executive producer Shawn Levy and his company 21 Laps Entertainment, along with Cosgrove-Meurer Productions (and Netflix) would be producing the new episodes. Original creators, Cosgrove and Meurer are expected to showrun the series, along with Levy and Josh Barry acting as executive producers. Robert Wise is expected to act as co-executive producer, along with showrunner Dunn Meurer. The reboot's format will depart from the original series' multiple mysteries showcase and will instead feature one case per episode. Cosgrove has stated that the reboot will be "pure documentary style" and there will be no host or narrator. The first six episodes are presented as Volume 1 on Netflix. Netflix announced on August 19, 2020, that the first season's six remaining episodes would air (as Volume 2) on October 19, 2020.

== Episodes ==
No. overall	No. in season	Mystery	Directed by	Original release date
Volume 1
582	1	Mystery on the Rooftop	Marcus A. Clarke	July 1, 2020
The strange death of 32-year-old writer and videographer Rey Rivera in Baltimore is explored.
583	2	13 Minutes	Jimmy Goldblum	July 1, 2020
38-year-old hair salon owner Patrice Endres vanishes from Cumming, Georgia in a 13-minute window of time, only for there to be a development in the case 600 days later.
584	3	House of Terror	Clay Jeter	July 1, 2020
The murders of the Dupont de Ligonnès family and the disappearance of Xavier Dupont de Ligonnès are investigated.
585	4	No Ride Home	Marcus A. Clarke	July 1, 2020
Alonzo Brooks goes missing after a party and is later found dead; some suspect a hate crime.
586	5	Berkshires UFO	Marcus A. Clarke	July 1, 2020
September 1, 1969 Berkshire UFO incident: Berkshire County residents recall their encounters with a UFO in 1969.
587	6	Missing Witness	Clay Jeter	July 1, 2020
Lena Chapin disappears from Steelville, Missouri after she claims to have knowledge of her missing stepfather's fate.
Volume 2
588	7	Washington Insider Murder	Dan Argott	October 19, 2020
The death of John P. Wheeler III is explored.
589	8	Death in Oslo	Robert M. Wise	October 19, 2020
The Jennifer Fairgate case, an unidentified woman who died in a hotel in Norway.
590	9	Death Row Fugitive	Robert M. Wise & Clay Jeter	October 19, 2020
Convicted murderer and sex offender Lester Eubanks’s escape from prison is chronicled.
591	10	Tsunami Spirits	Clay Jeter	October 19, 2020
People claim to see ghosts in Ishinomaki, Japan following a tsunami in 2011.
592	11	Lady in the Lake	Skye Borgman	October 19, 2020
The death of JoAnn Romain in Grosse Pointe Farms, Michigan is profiled.
593	12	Stolen Kids	Jessica Dimmock	October 19, 2020
The story of two toddlers who went missing within months of each other in Harlem in 1989.

== Response ==
On review aggregator Rotten Tomatoes, the series holds an approval rating of 74% based on 23 reviews, with an average rating of 6.92/10. The website's critics consensus reads: "Unsolved Mysteries' latest reboot is slick and features compelling cases, but fails to live up to the original's spookiness and gets lost in the current sea of true crime offerings." On Metacritic, it has a weighted average score of 57 out of 100, based on seven critics, indicating "mixed or average" reviews.

The show began getting "credible tips" following the release of the new season. Viewers also began coming up with their own theories about the cases featured. In August 2020, it was reported that 13.7% of subscribers had watched the series over its first month.
