= Linn Valley, Kansas =

- City
- Location within Linn County and Kansas

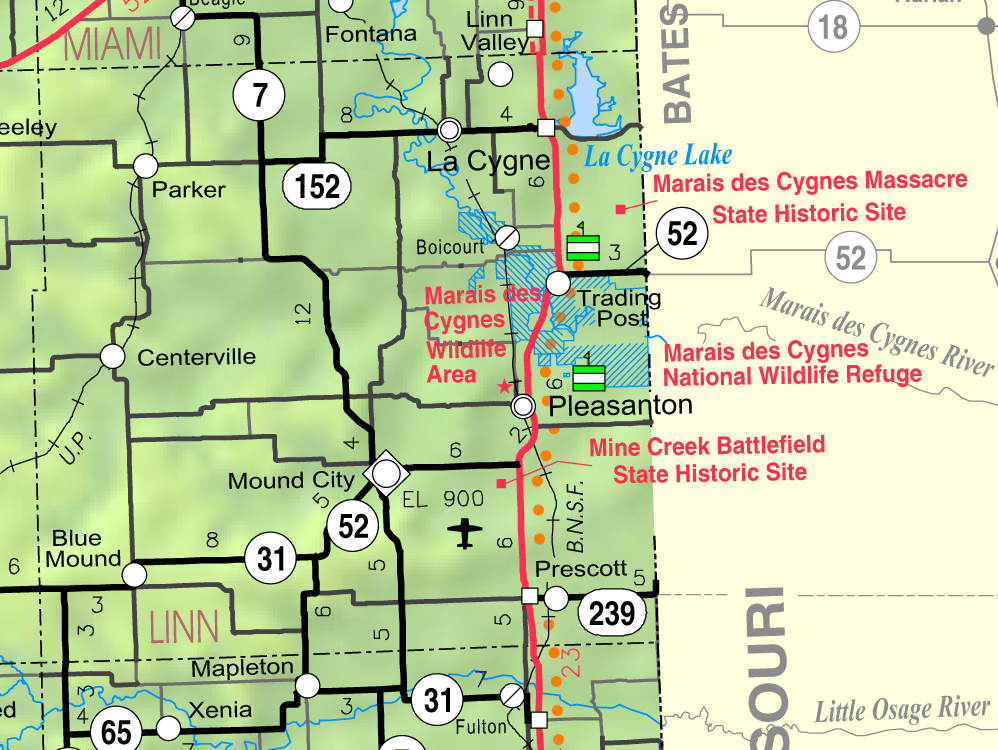
- KDOT map of Linn County (legend)
- Coordinates: 38°22′39″N 94°42′33″W
- Country: United States
- State: Kansas
- County: Linn
- Founded: 1970s
- Incorporated: 1998

Area
  - Total: 3.21 sq mi (8.32 km^{2})
  - Land: 2.96 sq mi (7.66 km^{2})
  - Water: 0.25 sq mi (0.65 km^{2})
- Elevation: 899 ft (274 m)

Population (2020)
  - Total: 956
  - Density: 323/sq mi (125/km^{2})
- Time zone: UTC-6 (CST)
  - Summer (DST): UTC-5 (CDT)
- ZIP Code: 66040
- Area code: 913
- FIPS code: 20-41465
- GNIS ID: 1852215
- Website: www.linnvalleyks.com

Linn Valley is a city in Linn County, Kansas, United States. As of the 2020 census, the population of the city was 956.

== History ==
Linn Valley had its start in the 1970s as a planned community centered around a lake. It was incorporated as a city in 1998.

== Geography ==
According to the United States Census Bureau, the city has a total area of 2.97 square miles (7.69 km^{2}), of which 2.72 square miles (7.04 km^{2}) is land and 0.25 square miles (0.65 km^{2}) is water. All but about 200 acres (0.81 km^{2}) of the City is within the private closed community of Linn Valley Lakes.

== Demographics ==
Historical population
Census	Pop.	Note	%±
2000	562		—
2010	804		43.1%
2020	956		18.9%
U.S. Decennial Census

=== 2020 census ===
The 2020 United States census counted 956 people, 457 households, and 299 families in Linn Valley. The population density was 323.2 per square mile (124.8/km^{2}). There were 637 housing units at an average density of 215.3 per square mile (83.1/km^{2}). The racial makeup was 90.79% (868) white or European American (89.64% non-Hispanic white), 1.46% (14) black or African-American, 1.36% (13) Native American or Alaska Native, 0.1% (1) Asian, 0.21% (2) Pacific Islander or Native Hawaiian, 0.94% (9) from other races, and 5.13% (49) from two or more races. Hispanic or Latino of any race was 3.14% (30) of the population.

Of the 457 households, 16.6% had children under the age of 18; 53.4% were married couples living together; 18.4% had a female householder with no spouse or partner present. 28.4% of households consisted of individuals and 14.2% had someone living alone who was 65 years of age or older. The average household size was 1.9 and the average family size was 2.5. The percent of those with a bachelor's degree or higher was estimated to be 16.2% of the population.

14.4% of the population was under the age of 18, 5.3% from 18 to 24, 11.7% from 25 to 44, 42.1% from 45 to 64, and 26.5% who were 65 years of age or older. The median age was 55.0 years. For every 100 females, there were 94.7 males. For every 100 females ages 18 and older, there were 92.5 males.

The 2016–2020 5-year American Community Survey estimates show that the median household income was $55,938 (with a margin of error of +/- $14,104) and the median family income was $75,875 (+/- $12,716). Males had a median income of $57,000 (+/- $11,001) versus $35,250 (+/- $6,417) for females. The median income for those above 16 years old was $41,976 (+/- $9,603). Approximately, 5.5% of families and 15.1% of the population were below the poverty line, including 33.5% of those under the age of 18 and 25.4% of those ages 65 or over.

=== 2010 census ===
As of the census of 2010, there were 804 people, 360 households, and 255 families residing in the city. The population density was 295.6 inhabitants per square mile (114.1/km^{2}). There were 697 housing units at an average density of 256.3 per square mile (99.0/km^{2}). The racial makeup of the city was 96.1% White, 0.1% African American, 1.2% Native American, 0.4% Asian, 0.1% from other races, and 2.0% from two or more races. Hispanic or Latino of any race were 1.4% of the population.

There were 360 households, of which 21.7% had children under the age of 18 living with them, 59.7% were married couples living together, 6.4% had a female householder with no husband present, 4.7% had a male householder with no wife present, and 29.2% were non-families. 27.5% of all households were made up of individuals, and 10% had someone living alone who was 65 years of age or older. The average household size was 2.23 and the average family size was 2.65.

The median age in the city was 50.9 years. 18.7% of residents were under the age of 18; 4% were between the ages of 18 and 24; 18.9% were from 25 to 44; 33.3% were from 45 to 64; and 25.1% were 65 years of age or older. The gender makeup of the city was 52.7% male and 47.3% female.

=== 2000 census ===
As of the census of 2000, there were 562 people, 238 households, and 178 families residing in the city. The population density was 221.7 inhabitants per square mile (85.6/km^{2}). There were 415 housing units at an average density of 163.7 per square mile (63.2/km^{2}). The racial makeup of the city was 95.02% White, 1.60% African American, 0.53% Native American, 0.18% Asian, 0.36% from other races, and 2.31% from two or more races. Hispanic or Latino of any race were 3.56% of the population.

There were 238 households, out of which 19.3% had children under the age of 18 living with them, 70.2% were married couples living together, 2.5% had a female householder with no husband present, and 25.2% were non-families. 19.3% of all households were made up of individuals, and 9.2% had someone living alone who was 65 years of age or older. The average household size was 2.36 and the average family size was 2.67.

In the city, the population was spread out, with 19.9% under the age of 18, 5.2% from 18 to 24, 21.2% from 25 to 44, 32.7% from 45 to 64, and 21.0% who were 65 years of age or older. The median age was 48 years. For every 100 females, there were 112.9 males. For every 100 females age 18 and over, there were 108.3 males.

The median income for a household in the city was $31,094, and the median income for a family was $34,500. Males had a median income of $30,972 versus $24,375 for females. The per capita income for the city was $18,479. About 5.1% of families and 8.9% of the population were below the poverty line, including 20.4% of those under age 18 and 7.1% of those age 65 or over.

== Education ==
The community is served by Prairie View USD 362 public school district.
