= Cadmus, Kansas =

Unincorporated community in Kansas, U.S.

Coordinates: 38°20′44″N 94°53′58″W

Cadmus is an unincorporated community in Linn County, Kansas, United States.

== History ==
A post office was opened in Cadmus in 1877, and remained in operation until it was discontinued in 1902.

== Education ==
The community is served by Prairie View USD 362 public school district.
