= Parker, Kansas =

- City
- Location within Linn County and Kansas

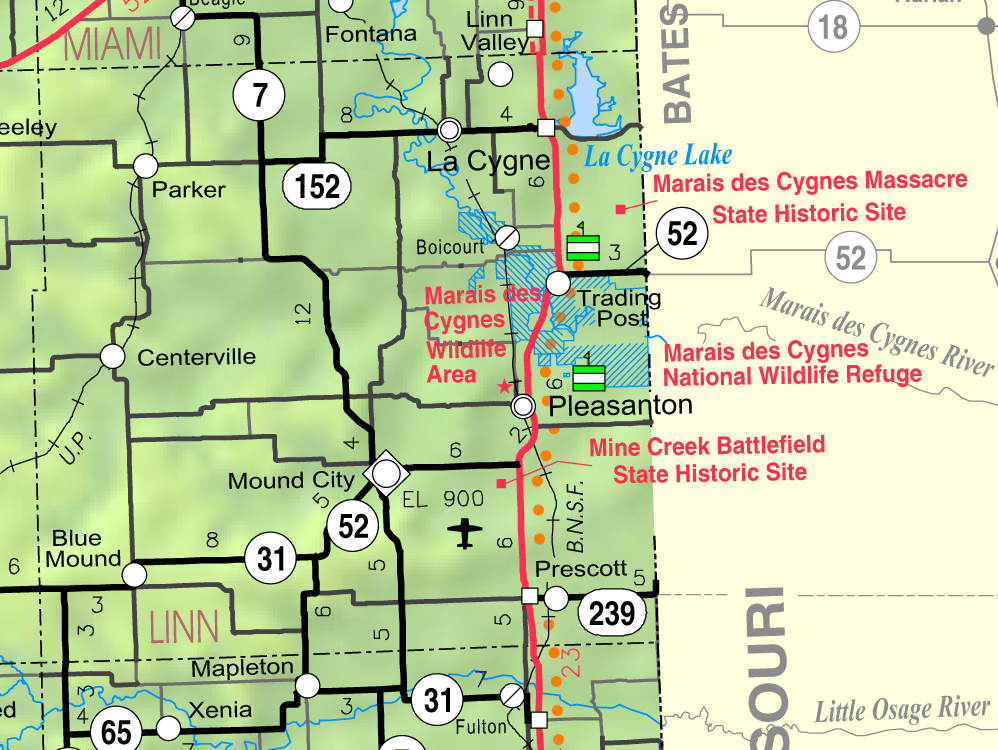
- KDOT map of Linn County (legend)
- Coordinates: 38°19′43″N 94°59′23″W
- Country: United States
- State: Kansas
- County: Linn
- Founded: 1880s
- Platted: 1889
- Incorporated: 1897
- Named for: J.W. Parker

Area
  - Total: 0.28 sq mi (0.73 km^{2})
  - Land: 0.28 sq mi (0.73 km^{2})
  - Water: 0 sq mi (0.00 km^{2})
- Elevation: 1,004 ft (306 m)

Population (2020)
  - Total: 241
  - Density: 860/sq mi (330/km^{2})
- Time zone: UTC-6 (CST)
  - Summer (DST): UTC-5 (CDT)
- ZIP Code: 66072
- Area code: 913
- FIPS code: 20-54500
- GNIS ID: 2396149
- Website: www.parkerks.com

Parker is a city in Linn County, Kansas, United States. As of the 2020 census, the population of the city was 241.

== History ==
Parker was laid out about 1889. It was named for J.W. Parker, who owned the town site.

The first post office in Parker was established in December 1888.

== Geography ==
According to the United States Census Bureau, the city has a total area of 0.27 square miles (0.70 km^{2}), all land.

== Demographics ==
Historical population
Census	Pop.	Note	%±
1900	306		—
1910	398		30.1%
1920	436		9.5%
1930	364		−16.5%
1940	361		−0.8%
1950	251		−30.5%
1960	181		−27.9%
1970	255		40.9%
1980	270		5.9%
1990	256		−5.2%
2000	281		9.8%
2010	277		−1.4%
2020	241		−13.0%
U.S. Decennial Census

=== 2020 census ===
The 2020 United States census counted 241 people, 89 households, and 55 families in Parker. The population density was 857.7 per square mile (331.1/km^{2}). There were 100 housing units at an average density of 355.9 per square mile (137.4/km^{2}). The racial makeup was 91.29% (220) white or European American (89.63% non-Hispanic white), 2.49% (6) black or African-American, 0.41% (1) Native American or Alaska Native, 1.24% (3) Asian, 0.0% (0) Pacific Islander or Native Hawaiian, 0.83% (2) from other races, and 3.73% (9) from two or more races. Hispanic or Latino of any race was 4.56% (11) of the population.

Of the 89 households, 33.7% had children under the age of 18; 50.6% were married couples living together; 16.9% had a female householder with no spouse or partner present. 29.2% of households consisted of individuals and 11.2% had someone living alone who was 65 years of age or older. The average household size was 2.8 and the average family size was 3.2. The percent of those with a bachelor's degree or higher was estimated to be 9.5% of the population.

26.1% of the population was under the age of 18, 5.8% from 18 to 24, 30.7% from 25 to 44, 23.7% from 45 to 64, and 13.7% who were 65 years of age or older. The median age was 38.3 years. For every 100 females, there were 99.2 males. For every 100 females ages 18 and older, there were 91.4 males.

The 2016–2020 5-year American Community Survey estimates show that the median household income was $81,528 (with a margin of error of +/- $25,336) and the median family income was $96,591 (+/- $25,531). Males had a median income of $76,205 (+/- $13,376) versus $20,179 (+/- $6,671) for females. The median income for those above 16 years old was $46,250 (+/- $15,685). Approximately, 3.9% of families and 4.3% of the population were below the poverty line, including 0.5% of those under the age of 18 and 17.0% of those ages 65 or over.

=== 2010 census ===
As of the census of 2010, there were 277 people, 100 households, and 66 families residing in the city. The population density was 1,025.9 inhabitants per square mile (396.1/km^{2}). There were 115 housing units at an average density of 425.9 per square mile (164.4/km^{2}). The racial makeup of the city was 98.9% White, 0.4% from other races, and 0.7% from two or more races. Hispanic or Latino of any race were 5.4% of the population.

There were 100 households, of which 42.0% had children under the age of 18 living with them, 53.0% were married couples living together, 7.0% had a female householder with no husband present, 6.0% had a male householder with no wife present, and 34.0% were non-families. 26.0% of all households were made up of individuals, and 10% had someone living alone who was 65 years of age or older. The average household size was 2.77 and the average family size was 3.39.

The median age in the city was 30 years. 33.2% of residents were under the age of 18; 7.8% were between the ages of 18 and 24; 29.7% were from 25 to 44; 18.4% were from 45 to 64; and 10.8% were 65 years of age or older. The gender makeup of the city was 52.3% male and 47.7% female.

=== 2000 census ===
As of the census of 2000, there were 281 people, 96 households, and 67 families residing in the city. The population density was 1,018.1 inhabitants per square mile (393.1/km^{2}). There were 109 housing units at an average density of 394.9 per square mile (152.5/km^{2}). The racial makeup of the city was 97.51% White, 0.36% from other races, and 2.14% from two or more races. Hispanic or Latino of any race were 0.36% of the population.

There were 96 households, out of which 43.8% had children under the age of 18 living with them, 59.4% were married couples living together, 8.3% had a female householder with no husband present, and 29.2% were non-families. 24.0% of all households were made up of individuals, and 8.3% had someone living alone who was 65 years of age or older. The average household size was 2.93 and the average family size was 3.59.

In the city, the population was spread out, with 34.9% under the age of 18, 9.6% from 18 to 24, 31.3% from 25 to 44, 11.4% from 45 to 64, and 12.8% who were 65 years of age or older. The median age was 30 years. For every 100 females, there were 97.9 males. For every 100 females age 18 and over, there were 92.6 males.

The median income for a household in the city was $24,531, and the median income for a family was $30,625. Males had a median income of $31,250 versus $21,250 for females. The per capita income for the city was $10,110. About 19.2% of families and 23.3% of the population were below the poverty line, including 33.6% of those under the age of eighteen and 21.1% of those 65 or over.

== Education ==
The community is served by Prairie View USD 362 public school district.

== Notable people ==
- Sam Brownback - former U.S. senator and 46th governor of Kansas.

== See also ==
- Wikinews interview with Parker native and Kansas Senator Sam Brownback
