= Lake Andes, South Dakota =

- City
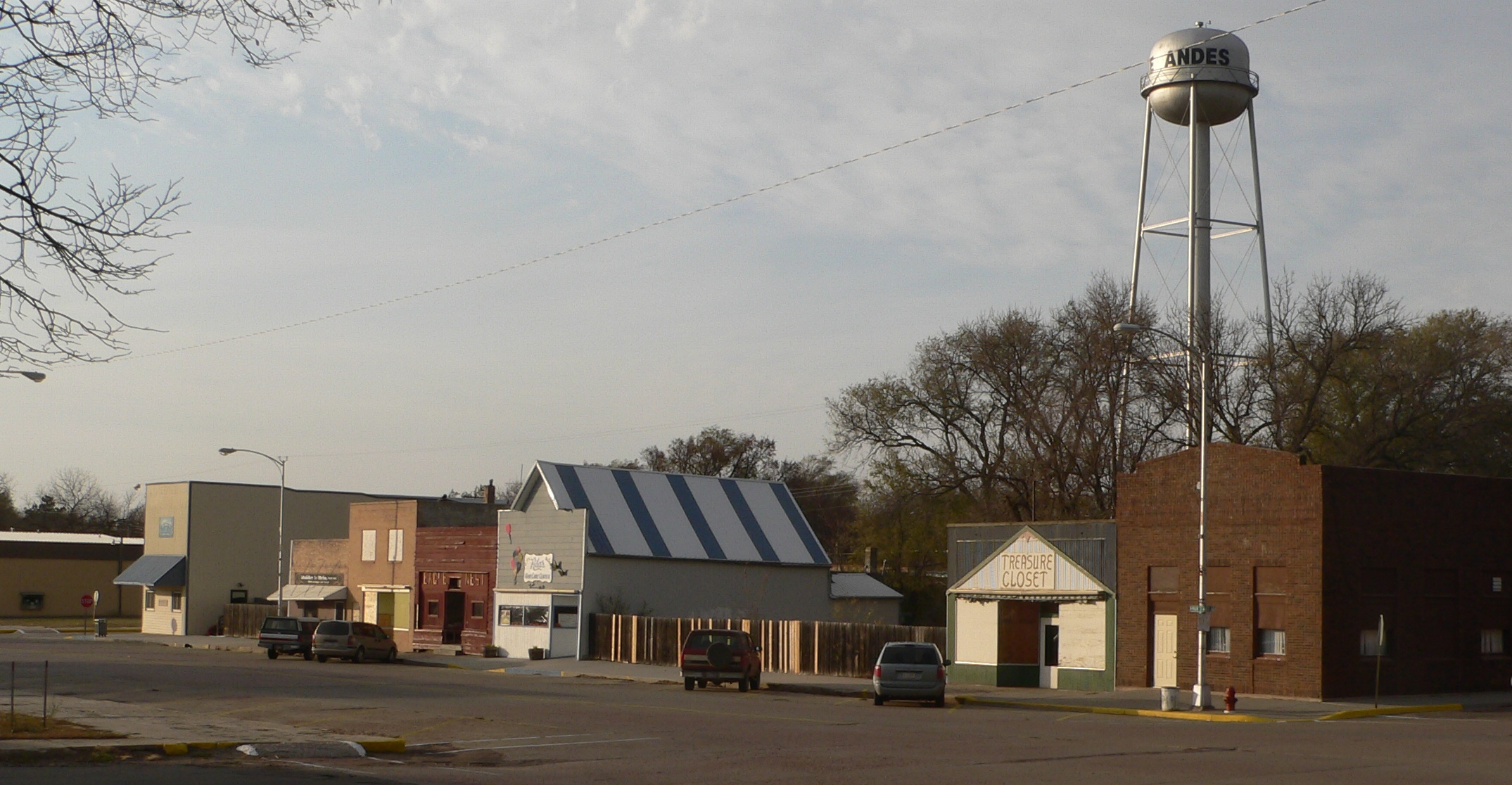
- Main Street, looking northwest, November 2011

- Location in Charles Mix County and the state of South Dakota
- Coordinates: 43°09′21″N 98°32′10″W
- Country: United States
- State: South Dakota
- County: Charles Mix
- Incorporated: 1905

Area
  - Total: 0.77 sq mi (1.99 km^{2})
  - Land: 0.75 sq mi (1.93 km^{2})
  - Water: 0.023 sq mi (0.06 km^{2})
- Elevation: 1,457 ft (444 m)

Population (2020)
  - Total: 710
  - Density: 951.7/sq mi (367.44/km^{2})
- Time zone: UTC-6 (Central (CST))
  - Summer (DST): UTC-5 (CDT)
- ZIP code: 57356
- Area code: 605
- FIPS code: 46-35100
- GNIS feature ID: 1267448

Lake Andes is a city in, and the county seat of, Charles Mix County, South Dakota, United States. The population was 710 at the 2020 census.

The town took its name from Lake Andes which some say derives its name from a pioneer hunter named Handy, while others believe was named after Edward Andes, a fur company official. The town and the lake names translate to Bde Ihaƞke in Dakota language of the native Yankton Sioux Tribe.

== Geography ==
The City of Lake Andes lies outside the Yankton Sioux Reservation boundaries, though adjacent lands are part of the Yankton Sioux Tribe's territory.

YST Transit serves the community and connects riders to Marty, Ravinia and Wagner as well.

According to the United States Census Bureau, the city has a total area of 0.82 square miles (2.12 km^{2}), of which 0.80 square miles (2.07 km^{2}) is land and 0.02 square miles (0.05 km^{2}) is water.

== Demographics ==
Historical population
Census	Pop.	Note	%±
1910	920		—
1920	867		−5.8%
1930	1,052		21.3%
1940	785		−25.4%
1950	1,851		135.8%
1960	1,097		−40.7%
1970	948		−13.6%
1980	1,029		8.5%
1990	846		−17.8%
2000	819		−3.2%
2010	879		7.3%
2020	710		−19.2%
U.S. Decennial Census

=== 2020 census ===
As of the 2020 census, Lake Andes had a population of 710. The median age was 35.9 years. 28.3% of residents were under the age of 18 and 18.7% of residents were 65 years of age or older. For every 100 females there were 94.0 males, and for every 100 females age 18 and over there were 91.4 males age 18 and over.

0.0% of residents lived in urban areas, while 100.0% lived in rural areas.

There were 263 households in Lake Andes, of which 37.3% had children under the age of 18 living in them. Of all households, 31.2% were married-couple households, 22.8% were households with a male householder and no spouse or partner present, and 36.9% were households with a female householder and no spouse or partner present. About 35.0% of all households were made up of individuals and 20.1% had someone living alone who was 65 years of age or older.

There were 316 housing units, of which 16.8% were vacant. The homeowner vacancy rate was 2.2% and the rental vacancy rate was 9.8%.

Racial composition as of the 2020 census
Race	Number	Percent
White	290	40.8%
Black or African American	2	0.3%
American Indian and Alaska Native	343	48.3%
Asian	3	0.4%
Native Hawaiian and Other Pacific Islander	0	0.0%
Some other race	4	0.6%
Two or more races	68	9.6%
Hispanic or Latino (of any race)	23	3.2%

=== 2010 census ===
As of the census of 2010, there were 879 people, 316 households, and 195 families residing in the city. The population density was 1,098.8 inhabitants per square mile (424.2/km^{2}). There were 361 housing units at an average density of 451.3 per square mile (174.2/km^{2}). The racial makeup of the city was 40.8% White, 0.1% African American, 52.7% Native American, 0.1% Asian, 0.1% from other races, and 6.1% from two or more races. Hispanic or Latino of any race were 2.8% of the population.

There were 316 households, of which 40.2% had children under the age of 18 living with them, 28.2% were married couples living together, 26.6% had a female householder with no husband present, 7.0% had a male householder with no wife present, and 38.3% were non-families. 34.8% of all households were made up of individuals, and 19.6% had someone living alone who was 65 years of age or older. The average household size was 2.52 and the average family size was 3.24.

The median age in the city was 33.8 years. 32.1% of residents were under the age of 18; 7.7% were between the ages of 18 and 24; 21.6% were from 25 to 44; 19.9% were from 45 to 64; and 18.7% were 65 years of age or older. The gender makeup of the city was 47.9% male and 52.1% female.

=== 2000 census ===
As of the census of 2000, there were 819 people, 320 households, and 181 families residing in the city. The population density was 1,019.7 inhabitants per square mile (393.7/km^{2}). There were 369 housing units at an average density of 459.4 per square mile (177.4/km^{2}). The racial makeup of the city was 54.82% White, 0.37% African American, 42.61% Native American, 0.49% from other races, and 1.71% from two or more races. Hispanic or Latino of any race were 2.20% of the population.

There were 320 households, out of which 31.3% had children under the age of 18 living with them, 36.9% were married couples living together, 15.0% had a female householder with no husband present, and 43.4% were non-families. 40.0% of all households were made up of individuals, and 20.6% had someone living alone who was 65 years of age or older. The average household size was 2.42 and the average family size was 3.33.

In the city, the population was spread out, with 30.2% under the age of 18, 7.8% from 18 to 24, 22.0% from 25 to 44, 20.0% from 45 to 64, and 20.0% who were 65 years of age or older. The median age was 37 years. For every 100 females, there were 87.8 males. For every 100 females age 18 and over, there were 86.9 males.

The median income for a household in the city was $21,000, and the median income for a family was $28,833. Males had a median income of $21,333 versus $19,097 for females. The per capita income for the city was $10,022. About 26.3% of families and 33.2% of the population were below the poverty line, including 40.7% of those under age 18 and 28.3% of those age 65 or over.

== Community events ==
Fish Days takes place annually the first weekend in June. The Fort Randall traditional pow wow takes place annually the first weekend in August at the pow wow grounds.

== Architecture ==
The Charles Mix County courthouse, located in Lake Andes, is a prominent fixture in the community. Constructed in the Prairie School architectural style, it was added to the National Register of Historic Places in 1993 as a significant example of architecture and local government.

On February 21, 2012, the 1910 Engel Hotel was listed on the NRHP. It is located at 202 Main Street and was built for the railroad industry.

== Education ==
The school district is Andes Central School District 11-1.

== Gallery ==
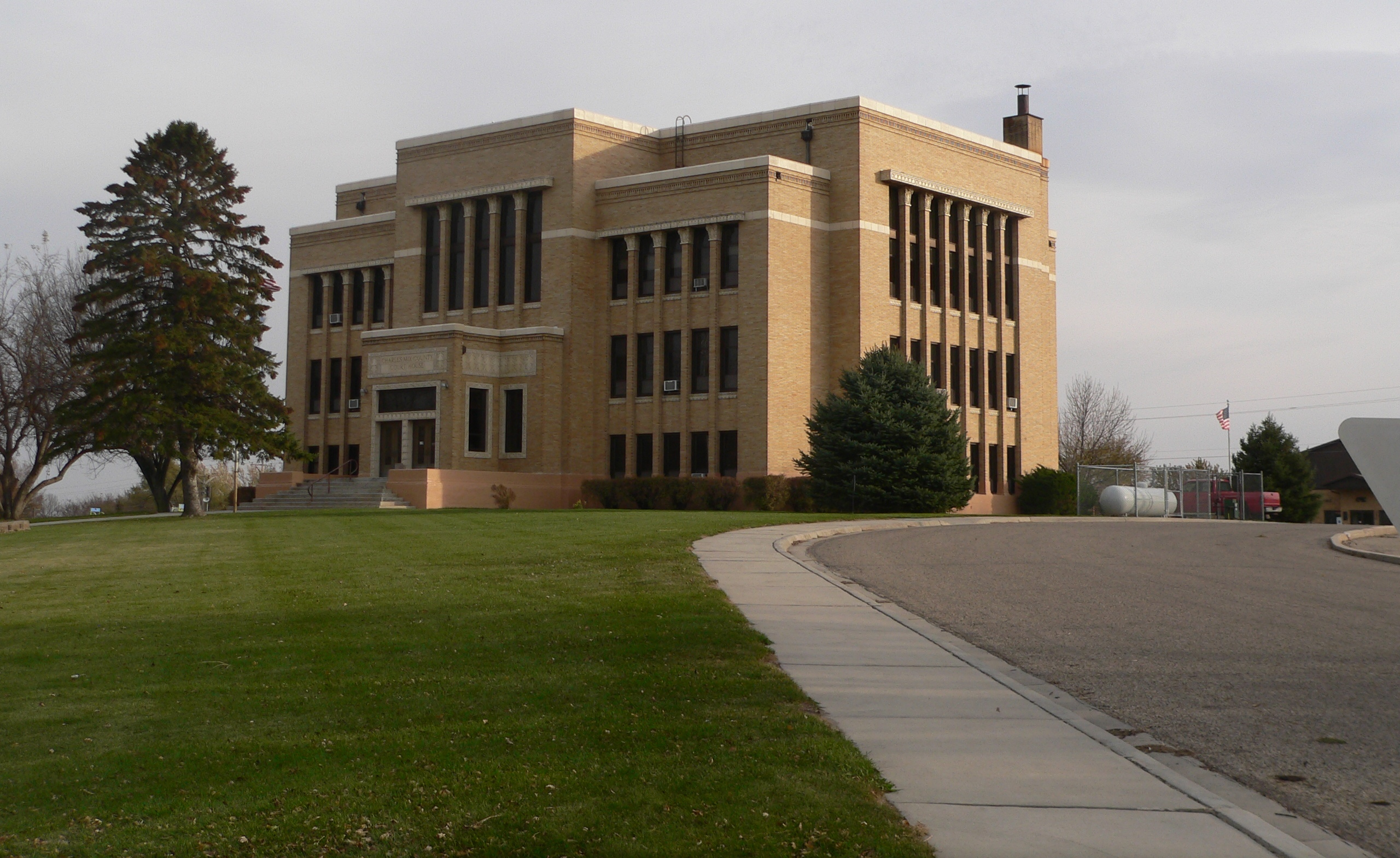
Charles Mix County Courthouse, listed on the National Register of Historic Places (NRHP)

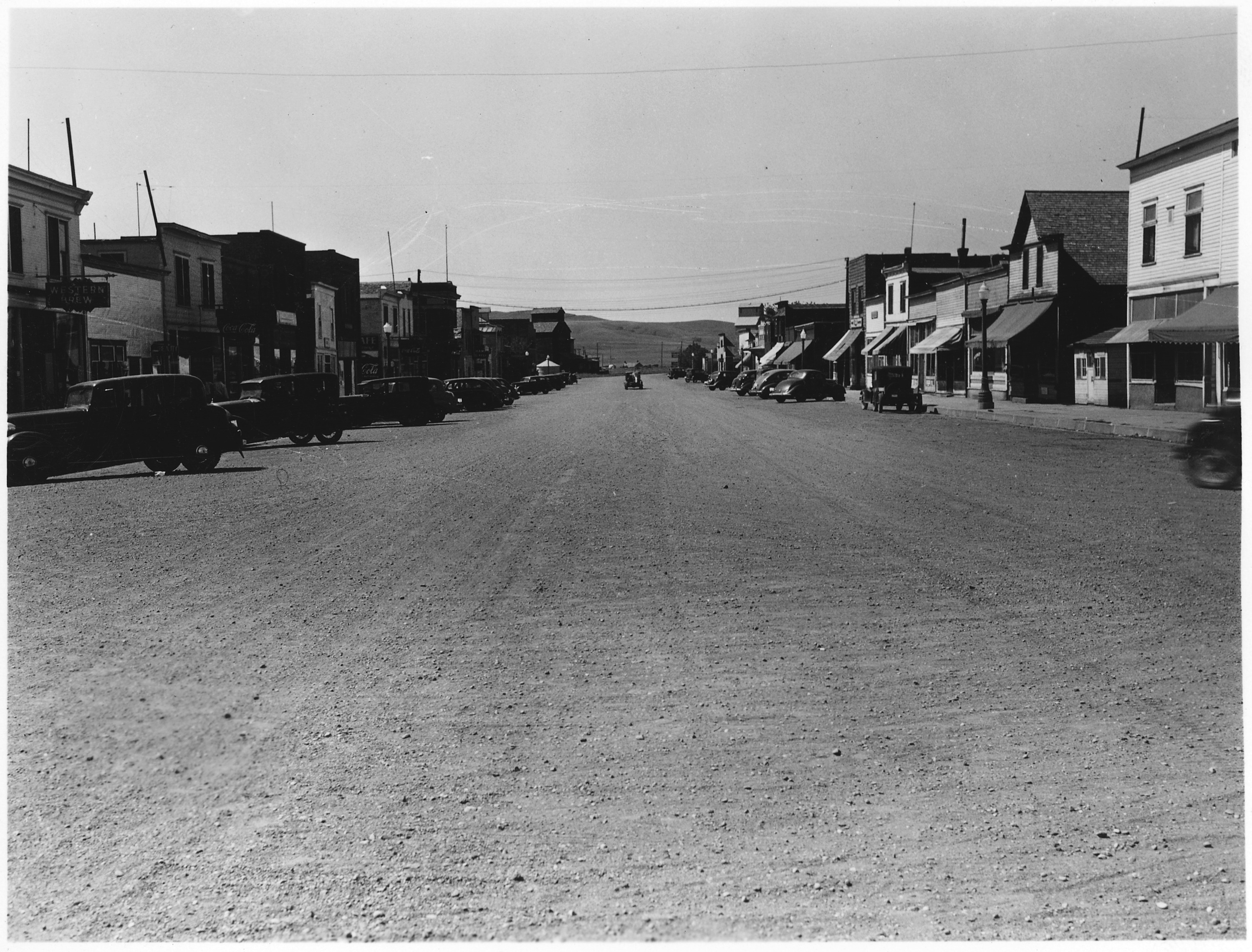
Main Street in 1939

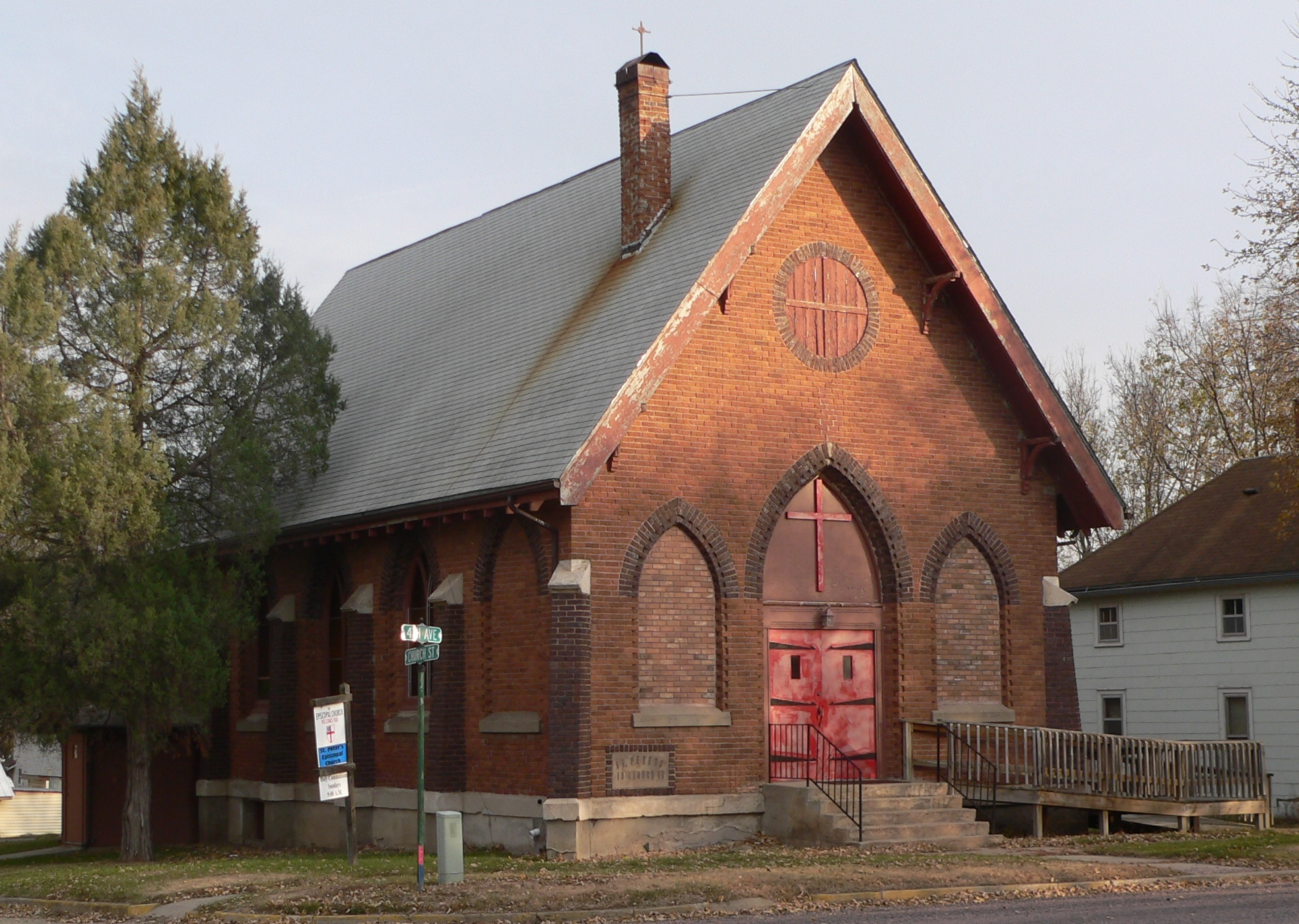
St. Peter's Episcopal Church

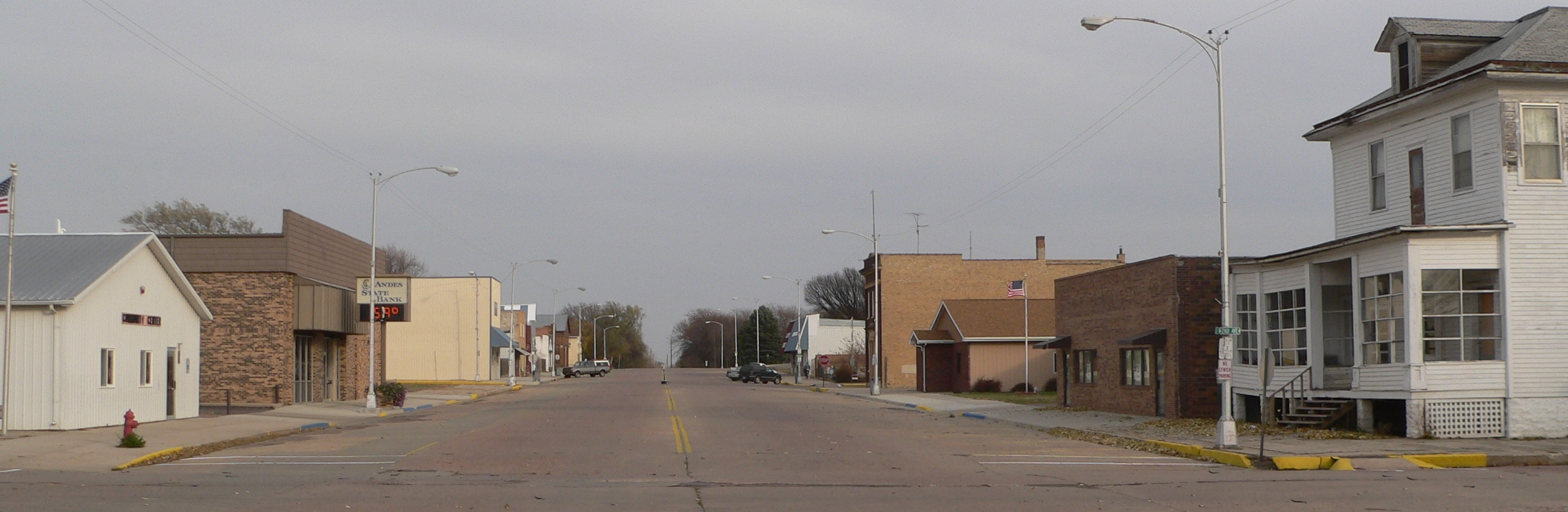
Main Street

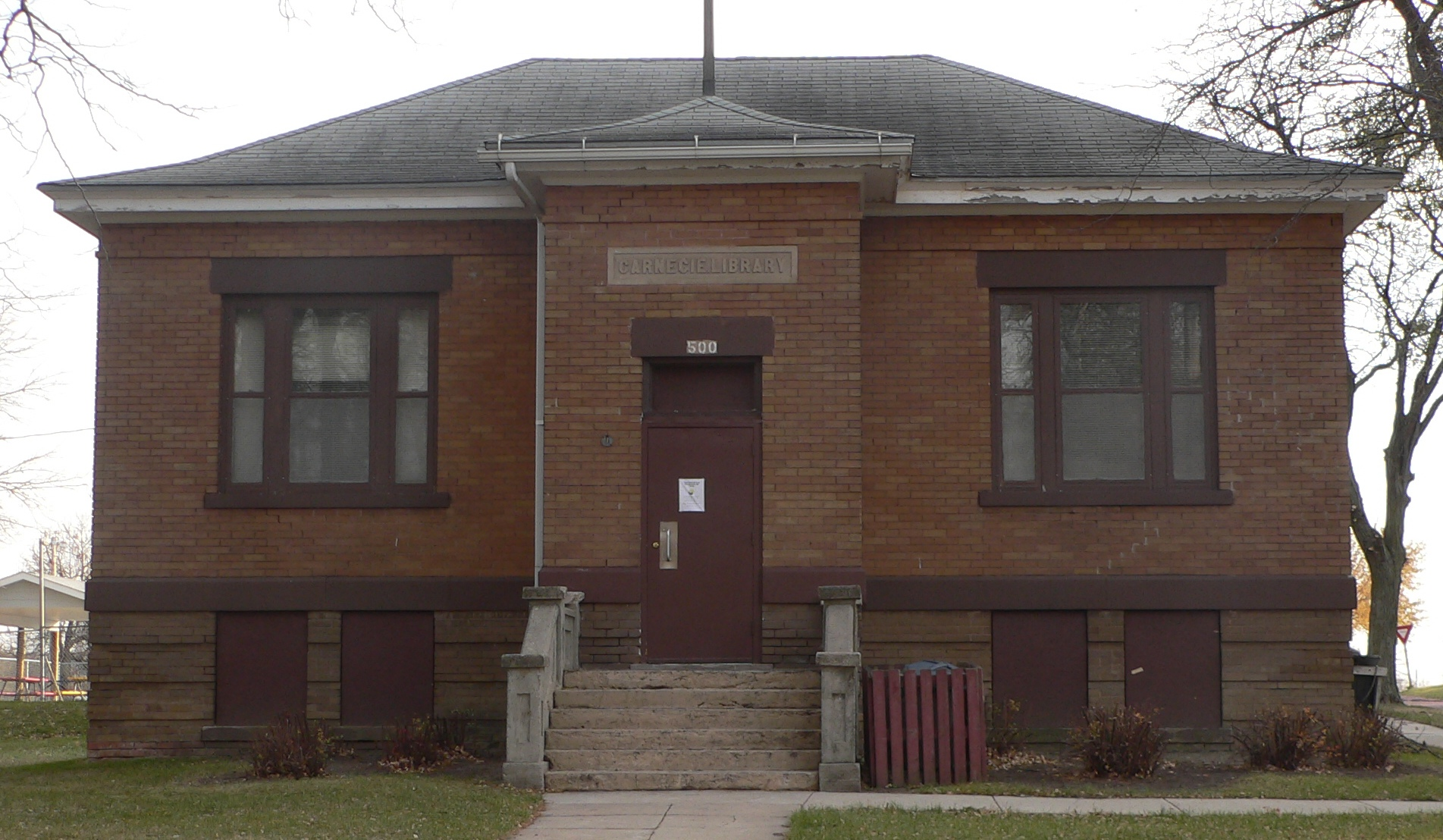
Lake Andes Carnegie Library, also NRHP-listed

== Notable people ==
- Faith Spotted Eagle, Native American activist
- John C. Miller Jr., brigadier general in the United States Marine Corps and World War II veteran

== See also ==
- List of cities in South Dakota
