= Charles Mix County Courthouse =

- U.S. National Register of Historic Places
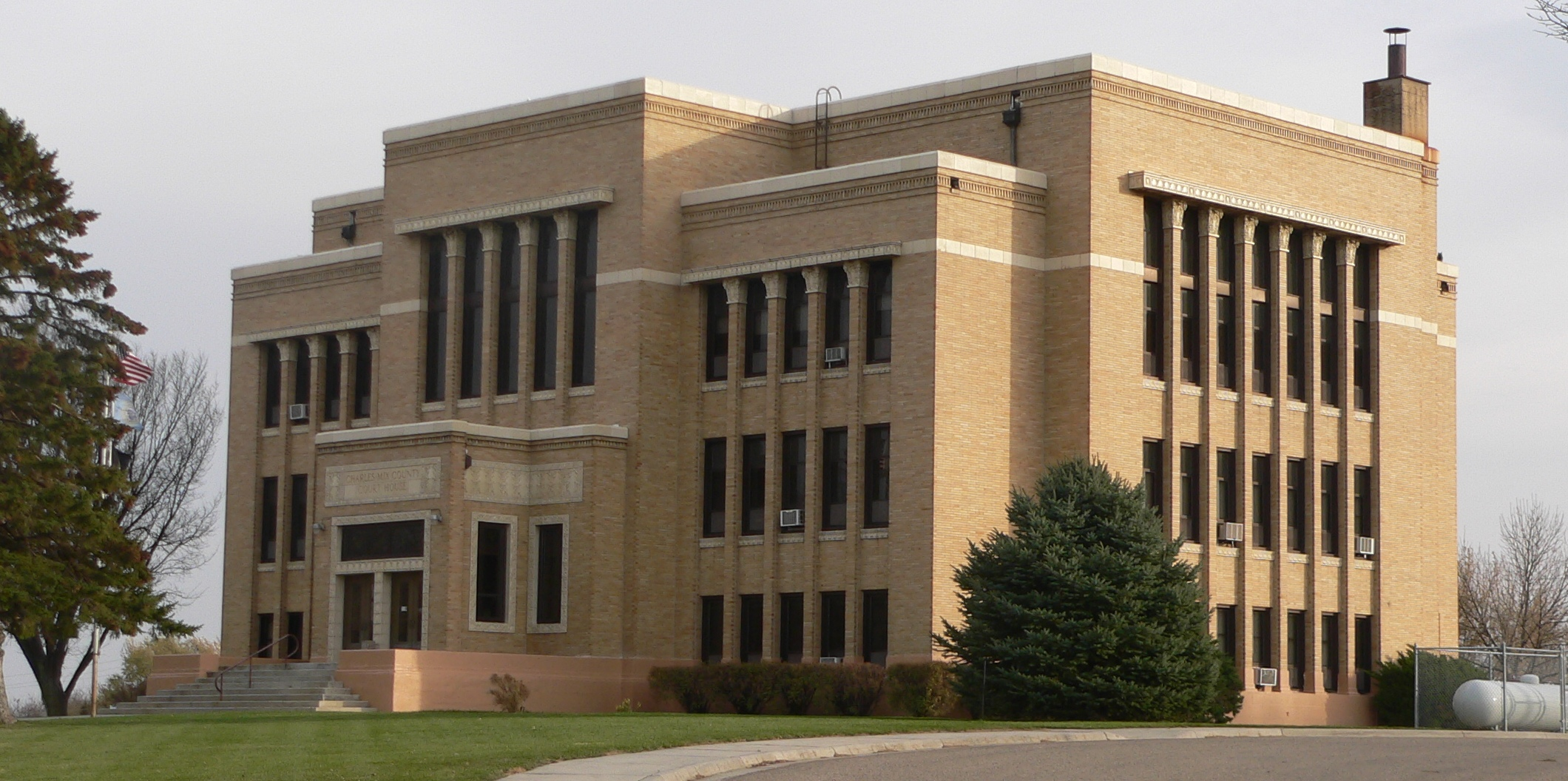

- Location within South Dakota Location within the United States
- Location: Main St. between Fourth and Fifth Sts., Lake Andes, South Dakota
- Coordinates: 43°09′20″N 98°32′16″W
- Area: less than one acre
- Built: 1918
- Built by: A.M. Wold Construction
- Architect: William L. Steele
- Architectural style: Prairie School
- MPS: County Courthouses of South Dakota MPS
- NRHP reference No.: 92001856
- Added to NRHP: February 10, 1993

Charles Mix County Courthouse, located on Main St. between Fourth and Fifth Sts. in Lake Andes, South Dakota, was built in 1918. It was listed on the National Register of Historic Places in 1993.

It is a three-story building, the only Prairie School-style courthouse in the state. It was designed by architect William L. Steele who also was involved in the design of the well-known Woodbury County Courthouse in Iowa.
