= Death of Rey Rivera =

Death of a man whose body was found in Baltimore, Maryland, US in 2006

- Date: May 24, 2006; 20 years ago (Note: This is the date the body was found.)
- Location: Belvedere Hotel, Baltimore, Maryland, U.S.; 39°18′07.5″N 76°36′55.8″W
- Cause: Undetermined, probable suicide
- Missing: May 16, 2006
- Inquiries: Baltimore Police Department
- Coroner: Baltimore City Medical Examiner

The body of Rey Rivera was found on May 24, 2006, inside the historic Belvedere Hotel in the Mount Vernon neighborhood of Baltimore, Maryland, United States. Although the event was ruled a probable suicide by the Baltimore Police Department, the circumstances of Rivera's death are mysterious and disputed.

== Background ==
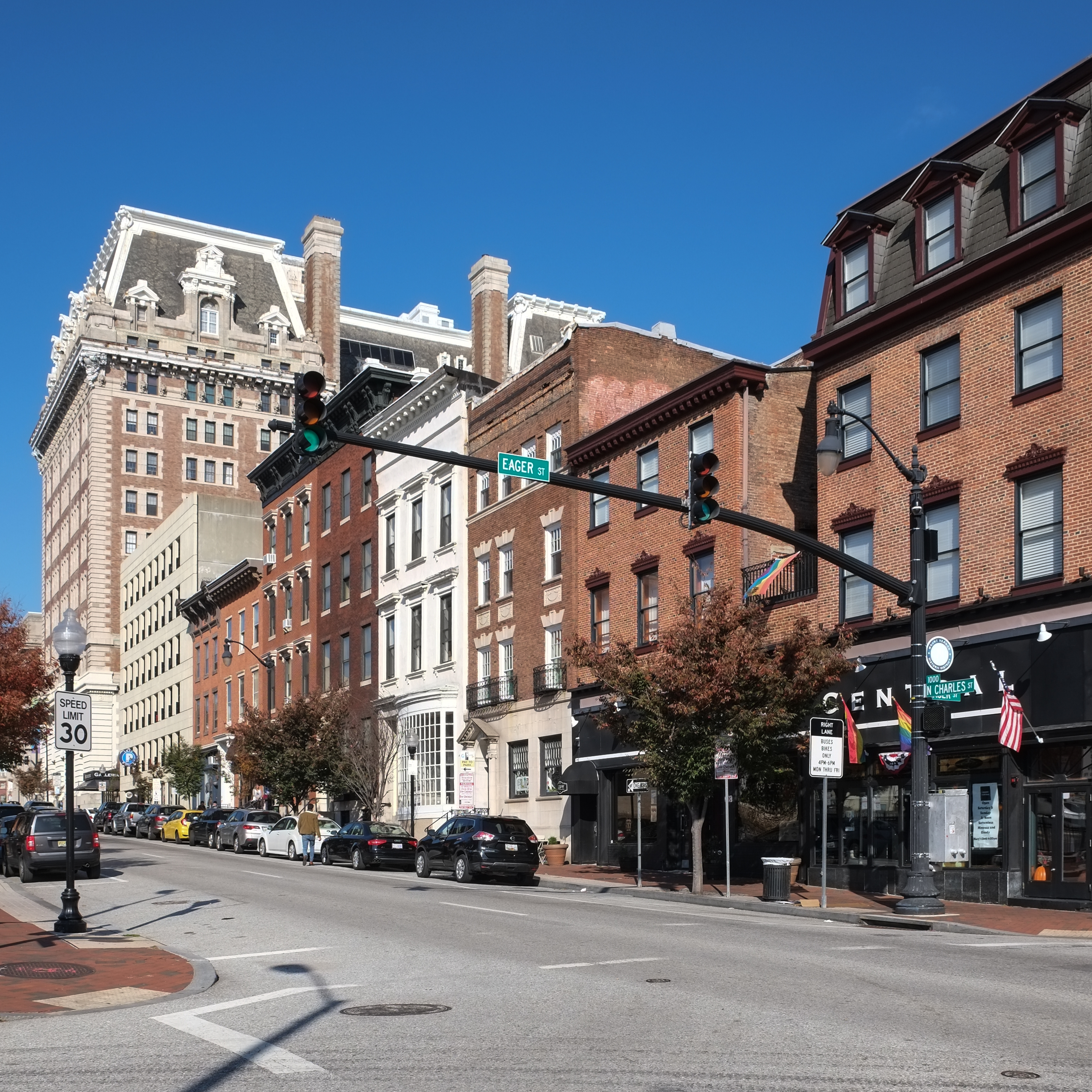
Rivera's car was found in a parking lot on St. Paul Street. Belvedere Hotel is located in the top left.

Rey Omar Rivera was born on June 10, 1973, to Angel and Maria Rivera. He was a former water polo player and coach, graduated from the University of the Pacific in 1995 and later played professionally in Spain. From 1998 to 2001, he coached the boys’ and girls’ swimming and water polo teams at John Burroughs High School in Burbank, California. One of his most successful seasons came in 2000, when he helped guide the girls’ team to a 25–6 record, a second-place finish in the Almont League, and a berth in the CIF Southern Section Division III semifinals. He subsequently served as an assistant coach for the men's water polo team at Johns Hopkins University.

At the time of his disappearance, Rivera and his wife Allison had relocated to Baltimore from California to work for his longtime friend, publisher Porter Stansberry, as a writer and videographer for Stansberry's investment company, Stansberry & Associates Investment Research, a subsidiary of Agora Publishing. (Note: Stansberry's company produced a newsletter advising on investments, which Rivera wrote for. Stansberry was in the process of being sued by the Securities and Exchange Commission (SEC), which complained that the company's newsletters "contain nothing more than baseless speculation and outright lies" and that in 2002, he had sent an email offering to sell the name of a company purportedly about to obtain a contract to dismantle nuclear weapons for Russia. The case went to trial in 2005, and in 2007, produced the ruling that "Stansberry's conduct undoubtedly involved deliberate fraud, making statements that he knew to be false," fining him $1.5 million.)

== Disappearance & investigation ==
Rivera's behavior in the days leading up to his death had become unusual. In the week before his disappearance, the alarm system at his home went off twice on separate occasions. His wife, Allison, said he was clearly frightened, which was out of character for him.

On the evening of May 16, 2006, Rivera went missing. Claudia, a houseguest of the Riveras at the time and a colleague of Allison's, stated that Rivera received a phone call, left the house in a hurry, and never returned. After reporting him missing and searching for him, family members eventually found his car parked in a Mount Vernon lot near the Belvedere Hotel and Stansberry and Associates, where he worked. From the top of the adjacent parking garage, they noticed a hole in one of the hotel's lower roofs. Police soon discovered Rivera's partially decomposed body in the room beneath the hole.

The autopsy revealed that Rivera had suffered rib fractures, broken shins, punctured lungs, and lacerations, along with other extreme bodily injuries. Michael Baier, a retired Baltimore Police Department detective who had been involved in the case, said he was among the few in law enforcement who doubted suicide as the cause of death, saying of the scene that "it looked staged." He was reassigned only three weeks after beginning his investigation. Although Rivera sustained numerous fatal injuries, his eyeglasses and phone were found undamaged on top of the Belvedere Hotel. Rivera's phone records showed that the last call he received came from the switchboard of Agora Publishing (the parent company of Stansberry & Associates), but the identity of the caller could not be determined. (Note: According to Stansberry, this allegation is impossible because, "Every person in our company who had worked with Rey was on the Eastern Shore at the time that call was made, having a corporate retreat".)

After searching the house for evidence, Rivera's wife found a note behind his computer. The note included the names of prominent figures in Hollywood, movie titles, Freemasonry quotations and additional ramblings. The Federal Bureau of Investigation analyzed the note and ruled it not to be suicidal in nature. Because circumstances surrounding the incident are unclear, the medical examiner marked Rivera's manner of death as "undetermined". The Baltimore Police Department ruled Rivera's death as a probable suicide.

== Media coverage ==
A year after Rivera's death, Baltimore television station WBAL-TV described it as "'one of the most unusual cases the city has ever seen".

Mikita Brottman, a writer and professor living at the Belvedere Hotel where Rivera's body was found, first learned of his disappearance from a missing poster. She followed the case for ten years and in 2018 published An Unexplained Death: The True Story of a Body at the Belvedere, describing Rivera as 6'5" and "like an old-fashioned movie idol," while expressing doubt about the suicide ruling: "I feel there has to be something more sinister going on."

Rivera's death was featured in the first episode "Mystery on the Rooftop" of the Netflix reboot of Unsolved Mysteries in July 2020. Terry Dunn Meurer, series’ producer and co-creator, said in an interview with TheWrap: "We’ve produced over 1300 stories in our lives, and I think Rey Rivera is one of the most intriguing and baffling mysteries that we have done." Angel Rivera, the brother of Rey Rivera, took part in the documentary series in the hope that it might lead someone to share new information about his brother's unexplained death. He said to The New York Times: "We’ll get it out to more ears and eyes than we could ever possibly imagined... For my parents, even for me, there’s that closure that we’re all looking for."

The show raised the possibility that Rivera had jumped from an 11th-floor ledge, but no one reported seeing him there, and no evidence indicated that he accessed it through a room or office. In addition, Rivera was also known to have a fear of heights.

After the series was released, a popular theory emerged on Reddit suggesting that Rivera's death was connected to the film The Game, which had been referenced in a note he left before his death. In the movie, the main character also jumps from the roof of a building through a glass ceiling. In an interview with Entertainment Weekly, Terry Dunn Meurer said she had asked Rivera's wife, Allison, about the theory, and Allison stated that she did not see any real connection between the death and the film. A detail not included in the episode but later revealed by Meurer was that an unidentified person had called the police station several times, showing unusual interest in the status of Rivera's computers and even asking about retrieving them, which left Allison feeling very troubled. Meurer emphasized that "one of the most baffling parts of this case" was the mysterious phone call from Rivera's workplace that prompted him to rush out of his home on the day of his disappearance. She urged the caller to come forward, suggesting that it could be the key to understanding what really happened.

Meurer also revealed that she had spoken directly with Porter Stansberry, who declined to be interviewed for Unsolved Mysteries, explaining that his company advised employees not to speak to the media. Although he denied imposing a gag order, investigators reported difficulty obtaining cooperation from his colleagues. She added that Stansberry had previously told the press that Rivera and his wife had been in therapy and that Rivera had psychological issues—claims that both she and Allison rejected as unfounded, noting that no one interviewed for the series agreed with his claims, and which Allison believed contributed to police treating the case as a suicide. According to Vanity Fair, Stansberry's refusal to participate in the Unsolved Mysteries episode led some viewers to speculate about his possible involvement in Rivera's disappearance, while The Baltimore Sun noted that the episode did not accuse him of wrongdoing but portrayed him as an off-screen figure who might know more than he revealed.

== See also ==
- Lists of solved missing person cases
- List of unsolved deaths
