= Tilson =

Tilson is a surname. Notable people with the surname include:

- Charles Henry Tilson Marshall (1841–1927), British Army Officer, serving in the Punjab, India
- Charles Tilson-Chowne (1881-?), British stage and film actor
- Charlie Tilson (born 1992), American baseball player
- David Tilson (born 1941), politician in Ontario, Canada
- Fred Tilson (1904–1972), association football player for Manchester City and England
- George Tilson (1672–1738), British civil servant, long-serving Under-Secretary of State in the Foreign Office
- Jake Tilson (born 1958) British artist
- Joe Tilson (artist) (1928–2023) British artist
- John Q. Tilson (1866–1958), Republican politician in the United States, on both state and national levels, and a lawyer
- John Tilson (cricketer) (1845–1895), English cricketer who played for Derbyshire between 1871 and 1876
- Michael Tilson Thomas (born 1944), American conductor, pianist and composer
- Sumner Dewey Tilson (1898–1964), head coach of the Virginia Tech college football program during the 1942 season
- Steve Tilson (born 1966), English football manager and former player
- Tilson Brito (born 1972), Dominican third baseman
- Tilson Pritchard (1872–1894), English footballer who played in the Football League for Small Heath
- Whitney Tilson (born 1966), American hedge fund manager, philanthropist, author, and Democratic political activist
- William Josiah Tilson (1871–1949), United States federal judge

== See also ==
- Red Tilson Trophy, annual award given to the most outstanding player in the Ontario Hockey League
- Tilson's Manual, or A Manual of Parliamentary Procedure, a parliamentary authority written by John Q. Tilson and published in 1948
