= Stansberry =

Stansberry is a surname. Notable people with the surname include:

- Craig Stansberry (born 1982), American former baseball player
- James W. Stansberry (1927–2010), American general and commander
- Joe Stansberry (born 1956), American golfer
- Porter Stansberry (born 1972), American financial publisher and author
  - Stansberry Research
- Richard Stansberry (1928–2016), American politician
- Taj Stansberry, American director and photographer

== See also ==
- Stansberry Lake, Washington
- 32432 Stansberry
