= MoneyWeek =

British weekly investment magazine

- Cover of 18 October 2024 issue
- Editor: Andrew Van Sickle
- Categories: Financial news
- Frequency: Weekly
- Circulation: 47,341 (December 2023)
- Founder: Jolyon Connell
- Founded: November 2000
- Company: MoneyWeek Limited (Future plc)
- Country: United Kingdom
- Website: moneyweek.com

MoneyWeek is a British weekly investment title that is published as a weekly magazine and in a number of digital formats (website, email newsletters and a mobile app). It provides commentary and analysis of UK and global markets, as well as property, tax and personal finance news. MoneyWeek is edited in London.

== History ==
MoneyWeek, founded by Jolyon Connell, was launched in November 2000 and originally published in association with Dennis Publishing. It was designed as a financial version of The Week magazine, which was founded by Jolyon Connell five years previously.

MoneyWeek was sold by Dennis Publishing to Financial News Ltd. in August 2002. In late 2003, it was bought by U.S. financial publisher, Agora Inc. headed by Bill Bonner, who contributed a weekly column in the magazine.

A South African edition of MoneyWeek was launched in June 2007, initially on a subscription basis, with newsstand availability beginning in 2008. In September 2008, MoneyWeek France, a French language edition of MoneyWeek, published in Paris, was launched. It ceased publishing in October 2011.

In 2017, MoneyWeek was re-acquired by Dennis Publishing, joining Dennis’ Current Affairs division. In 2020, MoneyWeek became part of Future Plc when it purchased Dennis Publishing.

== Content ==
MoneyWeek is edited by Andrew Van Sickle. Previous editors include John Stepek. and Merryn Somerset Webb. MoneyWeek.com and the MoneyWeek newsletters are edited by Kalpana Fitzpatrick.

MoneyWeek provides a digest of the week's financial and investment news, and also covers associated economic and political stories. In addition to the news digest, it features market commentary and analysis, share tips, interviews, travel and lifestyle pieces. Regular columnists include Bill Bonner, Matthew Lynn, Charlie Morris and Dominic Frisby.
