= Agora, Inc. =

Network of companies in the publishing, information services, and real estate industries

- Founded: 1978
- Founder: Bill Bonner
- Country of origin: United States
- Headquarters location: Baltimore, Maryland
- Publication types: Newsletters, books, websites
- Nonfiction topics: Finance
- Official website: theagora.com

Agora, Inc. is a Baltimore, Maryland-based network for over thirty companies in the publishing, information services, and real estate industries. Agora was founded in 1978, in the Mount Vernon neighborhood of Baltimore, Maryland. The Agora Companies operate independently from cities around the world.

== History ==
Agora was founded by Bill Bonner in 1978. Agora began with one flagship publication in 1979, International Living. Throughout the 1980s, 1990s, and 2000s, Agora expanded to include publishing subsidiaries, real estate holdings, and restaurants. As of 2015, Agora's publications claimed to have around one million readers throughout the world.

In 2016 the company, previously Agora, Inc., was reintroduced as The Agora. It represents a private network for businesses that publish financial, health, travel research, and analysis as well as special interest books and newsletters.

== Historic preservation ==
Agora has played a significant role in the preservation and adaptive reuse of historic architecture in Baltimore’s Mount Vernon neighborhood. In 1994, Agora purchased what was to become its headquarters, the Marburg Mansion at 14 West Mount Vernon Place. It forms part of Agora’s Mount Vernon office campus, a collection of historic buildings used as offices.

Agora’s Mount Vernon campus includes multiple landmark properties along Mount Vernon Place and nearby Charles Street. Several of these buildings have been featured in public architecture and preservation programs, including Doors Open Baltimore.

== Operations ==
As of 2015, the combined revenue of all of The Agora Companies is around $500 million. Companies included in The Agora network have purchased access to the email lists of conservative politicians, including Mike Huckabee, Ron Paul, and Newt Gingrich, to advertise its products.

=== Companies ===
Each Agora company is independently operated. U.S.-based member companies of The Agora's network include: Agora Financial, Laissez Faire Books, Common Sense Publishing, The Oxford Club, Money Map Press, Wall Street Daily, Bonner and Partners, TradeSmith, NewMarket Group, Institute of Natural Healing, Banyan Hill Publishing, and Omnivista Health.

Agora's non-U.S.-based members include:International Living Publishing, International Living, International Living Properties, Agora Publishing UK, Agora Lifestyles, Fleet Street Publications, FSP Financial Services, Fleet Street Publications South Africa, Southbank Investment Research, and Fat Tail Investment Research.

=== Books and newsletters ===
As of 2016, The Agora Companies published a combined total of nearly 300 books and over 120 newsletters through thirty-six publishers. Their titles include:The Daily Reckoning, an email newsletter with more than 500,000 subscribers, and the UK-based investment magazine, MoneyWeek, which from January to June 2011 had an Audit Bureau of Circulation certified circulation of 47,366.

Authors published by the Agora companies have written bestselling books, including:

- Michael Masterson
- Bill Bonner and Lila Rajiva
- Marc Lichtenfeld
- Addison Wiggin and Bill Bonner
  - Empire of Debt: Rise of an Epic Financial Crisis

== Litigation against Agora Inc. ==
In Ginsburg v. Agora, Inc., 915 F. Supp. 733 (1995), Agora defended itself against a civil suit claiming violations of state and federal securities laws. The court dismissed the complaint, holding that Agora, as the publisher of a subscription investment newsletter, was protected by the First Amendment against liability for factual misstatements.

In Lubin v. Agora, Inc., 882 A.2d 833 (2005), pursuant to an investigation into potential violations of Maryland securities laws, the Maryland Securities Commissioner served two subpoenas duces tecum on Agora. Following Agora’s refusal to produce its subscriber lists, marketing lists, and other documents containing information identifying any of its subscribers, the Commissioner filed a motion to compel enforcement. The trial court ruled in favor of Agora and denied the motion, concluding that the Commissioner had failed to demonstrate a compelling need for the subscriber lists as required by the First Amendment, and that the demand for subscriber lists was overbroad. The Maryland Securities Commissioner appealed this decision, but the appeals court ruled in favor of Agora. In its opinion, the appeals court unanimously ruled the First Amendment prevents the Commissioner from compelling the discovery of the identities of Agora’s subscribers.

In "SEC v. Agora, Inc., Pirate Investor, and Frank Porter Stansberry", (SEC v. Agora complaint, 2003), the SEC alleged Agora companies wrongly profited from selling false information marketed as insider tips. In US SEC v. Pirate Investor LLC, 580 F.3d 233, 255 (4th Cir. 2009) the US Court of Appeal, against the arguments from publishing industry interveners, found fraud by the Agora company, and confirmed that punishing fraud, whether common law fraud or securities fraud, does not violate the First Amendment.

Despite being in business for over 17 years, Agora's child company, Agora Financial, currently has its rating suspended by the Better Business Bureau. The company is no longer a BBB accredited company, due to a high volume of complaints. The complaints range from poor communication by Customer Service Representatives, to false advertising/misrepresentation and generally include statements that the company has 'stolen' funds from subscribers. Agora Financial stated that the number of complaints seemed so high due to a recent growth in their company. As of 2019, there are over 300 complaints on the company's BBB page.

== Philanthropy ==
In 2002, Agora created the non-profit Roberto Clemente Santa Ana Health Clinic to provide low cost and free medical care to the community of Limon 1 in southwest Nicaragua. The clinic serves about 12,000 patients each year.

== See also ==
- Porter Stansberry
- Stansberry Research
