= Mark Skousen =

American economist and writer (born 1947)

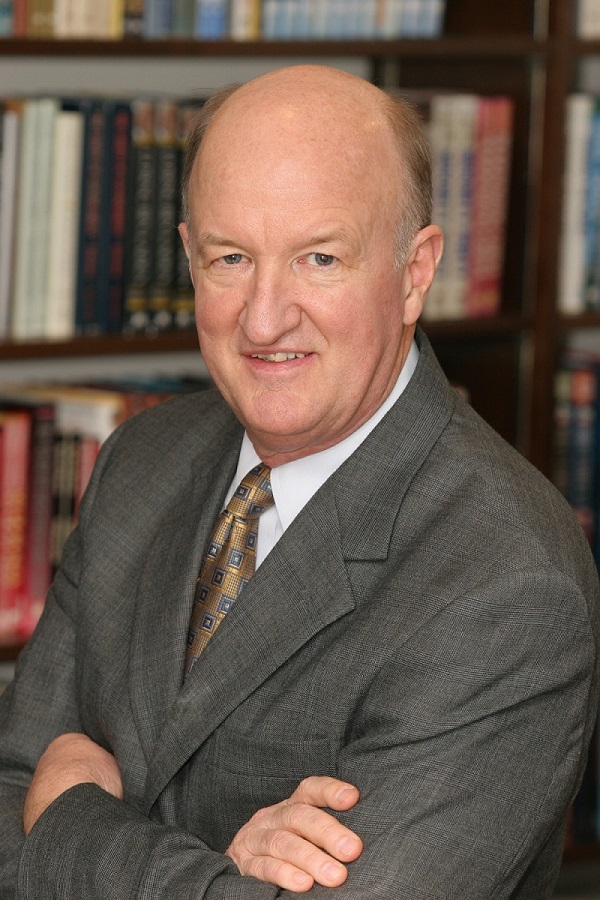
- Skousen in 2004
- Born: Mark Andrew Skousen; October 19, 1947 (age 78); San Diego, California, U.S.
- Spouse: Jo Ann

Academic background
- Education: Brigham Young University (BA, MA); George Washington University (PhD)
- Influences: Adam Smith; Karl Marx; John Maynard Keynes; Ludwig von Mises; W. Cleon Skousen

Academic work
- Discipline: Economics
- School or tradition: Austrian School of Economics

Mark Andrew Skousen (/ˈskaʊzən/; born October 19, 1947) is an American economist and writer. He currently teaches at Chapman University, where he has been a Presidential Fellow since 2014, and the Doti-Spogli chair in free enterprise at the Argyros School of Business and Economics since 2022.

== Early life, education and family ==
Skousen was born on October 19, 1947, in San Diego, California, and grew up in Portland, Oregon. Conservative political commentator and survival strategist Joel Skousen and linguist Royal Skousen are his older brothers. He is the nephew of W. Cleon Skousen, the political conservative and activist. Mark Skousen earned his B.A. and Master's degree in economics from Brigham Young University and his PhD in economics from George Washington University in 1977.

Skousen is a member of the Church of Jesus Christ of Latter-day Saints. He has five children with his wife Jo Ann.

== Career ==
Skousen was an economic analyst for the CIA from 1972 to 1975. He later worked as a consultant for IBM and Hutchinson Technology, and other companies. He was a columnist for Forbes magazine from 1997 to 2001, and has contributed articles to The Wall Street Journal as well as to various libertarian periodicals. He has been a speaker at investment conferences and has lectured for think tanks. From 2008 to 2010 he was a weekly contributor on CNBC's Kudlow & Company and has also appeared on C-SPAN Book TV and Fox News.

After 45 years of writing Forecasts & Strategies, he left Eagle Financial Publications in February, 2026, and now is the editor of The Skousen Report at The Oxford Club. He is also the editor of two trading services, the Skousen Intelligence Alert and the Future Tech Trader, as well as a regular columnist for two Oxford Club e-letters, Liberty through Wealth and Wealth Retirement.

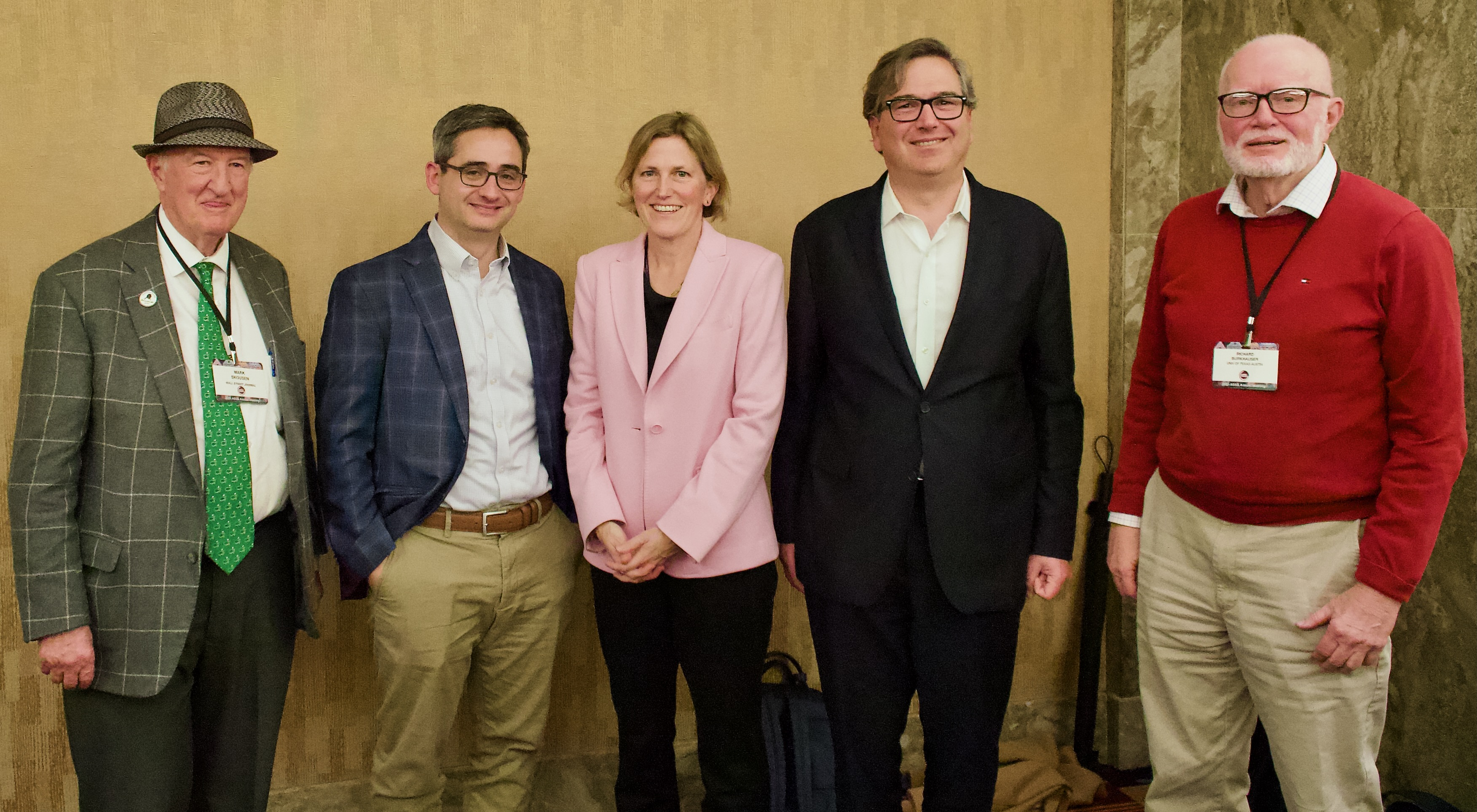
Mark Skousen, Oren Cass, Kimberly Clausing, Jason Furman, Richard Burkhauser at AEA 2025

=== Academia ===
Skousen has lectured on economics and finance at Columbia Business School, Barnard College, Mercy College, Rollins College, and Chapman University. In April 2005, distance education provider Grantham University renamed its online School of Business "The Mark Skousen School of Business." He currently teaches at Chapman University. In 2014, Skousen was named the Presidential Fellow at Chapman and has been elevated to the Doti-Spogli chair in free enterprise at Chapman University's Argyros School of Business and Economics in 2022.

=== Foundation for Economic Education ===
Skousen served as president of the libertarian economic think tank The Foundation for Economic Education (FEE) from 2001 to 2002. Skousen's brief tenure as president of FEE ended on a controversial note when he resigned in late 2002 at the request of the organization's board of trustees. During his tenure at FEE, Skousen launched a non-partisan, libertarian conference, then titled "FEEFest," which premiered in Las Vegas in 2002. After Skousen left the presidency at FEE, the conference continued as "FreedomFest," first under the purview of Young America's Foundation, and later, under Skousen's own direction and ownership.

=== Economics ===
Skousen is a proponent of Gross Output (GO), an economic concept used to measure total economic activity in the production of new goods and services in an accounting period. Skousen highlighted the concept in his work, The Structure of Production in 1990, and publishes his research and updates about the topic on the https://grossoutput.com/ website.

== Written works ==
Academic books

- High Finance on a Low Budget (Bantam Books, 1981, Dearborn, 1993), co-authored with Jo Ann Skousen ISBN 079312557X
- The Complete Guide to Financial Privacy (Simon & Schuster, 1983) ISBN 0932496113
- The Structure of Production (New York University Press, 1990) ISBN 0-8147-7895-X
- Economics on Trial (Irwin McGraw Hill, 1991; 2nd edition, 1993) ISBN 1-55623-372-8
- The Investor's Bible: Mark Skousen's Principles of Investment (Phillips Publishing, 1992)
- Dissent on Keynes, editor (Praeger Publishing, 1992) ISBN 027593778X
- Puzzles and Paradoxes in Economics, co-authored with Kenna C. Taylor (Edward Elgar, 1997) ISBN 1840640499
- Secrets of the Great Investors, editor, audio tape series, narrated by Louis Rukeyser (Knowledge Products, 1997, 2006) ISBN 078616526X
- Economic Logic (Capital Press, 2000, 2008, 2011, 2014, 2017, 2024). ISBN 978-1-68451-442-7
- The New Scrooge Investing (McGraw Hill, 2000) ISBN 9780071355001
- The Making of Modern Economics (M. E. Sharpe Publishers, 2001, 2009) ISBN 0765622270
- The Power of Economic Thinking (Foundation for Economic Education, 2002) ISBN 1572462019
- Vienna and Chicago: Friends or Foes? A Tale of Two Schools of Free-Market Economics (Capital Press, 2005) ISBN 0895260298
- The Completed Autobiography by Benjamin Franklin, compiled and edited by Mark Skousen (Regnery Books, 2006) ISBN 0895260336
- The Big Three in Economics: Adam Smith, Karl Marx and John Maynard Keynes (M. E. Sharpe, 2007) ISBN 0765616947
- Investing in One Lesson (Regnery Publishing, Inc, 2007) ISBN 1596985224
- EconoPower: How a New Generation of Economists Is Transforming the World (Wiley & Sons, 2008) ISBN 0470138076
- Maxims of Wall Street (Skousen Publishing, Inc 2011) ISBN 1596982985
- A Viennese Waltz Down Wall Street (Laissez Faire Books, 2013) ISBN 1621290921
- The Greatest American: Benjamin Franklin, the World’s Most Versatile Genius (Republic Book Publishers, 2025) ISBN 978-1645721000

Academic journal articles

- "Saving the Depression: A New Look at World War II," Review of Austrian Economics, 1987, vol. 2, No. 1
- "A Review of the New Palgrave," Review of Austrian Economics, 1988, vol. 3, No. 1
- "The Perseverance of Paul Samuelson's Economics," Journal of Economic Perspectives vol. 11, No. 2 (Spring, 1997), 137–152 JSTOR 2138240
- "GO Beyond GDP: Introducing a New National Income Statistic," (presented at the "Macro Lunch", Columbia Business School, paper to be submitted to American Economic Review)
- "What Drives the Economy: Consumer Spending or Saving/Investment? Using GDP, Gross Output and Other National Income Statistics to Determine Economic Performance," Backgrounder, 2004, Initiative for Policy Dialogue,
- "Gross Domestic Expenditures (GDE): The Case for New National Aggregate Statistic", 2012, a working paper at University College of London
- "GO Beyond GDP: Introducing Gross Output, The "Top Line" in National Income Accounting", SSNR, December 13, 2024, https://papers.ssrn.com/sol3/papers.cfm?abstract_id=5002052
- "There’s Much Ruin in a Nation: An Analysis of Modern Monetary Theory", Atlantic Economic Journal, Springer; International Atlantic Economic Society, vol. 48(1), pages 11-21, March. https://ideas.repec.org/a/kap/atlecj/v48y2020i1d10.1007_s11293-020-09651-9.html
- "The Economics of Life Made Simple", Skeptic Magazine, Volume 28 Number 1, May 9, 2023https://archive.skeptic.com/archive/reading_room/economics-of-life-made-simple/
- "The Case for a Free & Prosperous Society", Skeptic magazine, Volume 30 Number 2, July 4, 2025, https://www.skeptic.com/article/case-for-free-prosperous-society/
- "A Nod to Freedom at the American Economic Association", Wall Street Journal, January 16, 2025, https://www.wsj.com/opinion/a-nod-to-freedom-at-the-american-economic-association-588a498c?
- "Beneath the GDP, a Recession Warning", Wall Street Journal, September 28, 2025, https://www.wsj.com/opinion/beneath-the-gdp-a-recession-warning-fff133de?
- "Share the Wealth, Don’t Redistribute It", Wall Street Journal, Wall Street Journal, November11, 2025, https://www.wsj.com/opinion/share-the-wealth-dont-redistribute-it-230d1e98?

Articles in edited volumes

- "The Great Depression," The Elgar Companion to Austrian Economics, ed. Peter J. Boettke. Hants, England: Edward Elgar, 1994
- "Financial Economics," The Elgar Companion to Austrian Economics, ed. Peter J. Boettke. Hants, England: Edward Elgar, 1994
- "Say's Law, Growth Theory, and Supply Side Economics," Two Hundred Years of Say's Law, ed. Steven Kates. Hants, England: Edward Elgar, 2003
- Hamowy, Ronald, ed. (2008). "Classical Economics". The Encyclopedia of Libertarianism. Thousand Oaks, CA: Sage; Cato Institute. pp. 71–73. doi:10.4135/9781412965811.n47. ISBN 978-1412965804. LCCN 2008009151. OCLC 750831024.
- Hamowy, Ronald, ed. (2008). "Ricardo, David (1772–1823)". The Encyclopedia of Libertarianism. Thousand Oaks, CA: Sage; Cato Institute. pp. 433–434. doi:10.4135/9781412965811.n265. ISBN 978-1412965804. LCCN 2008009151. OCLC 750831024.
