= Floyd Brown =

American political consultant (born 1961)

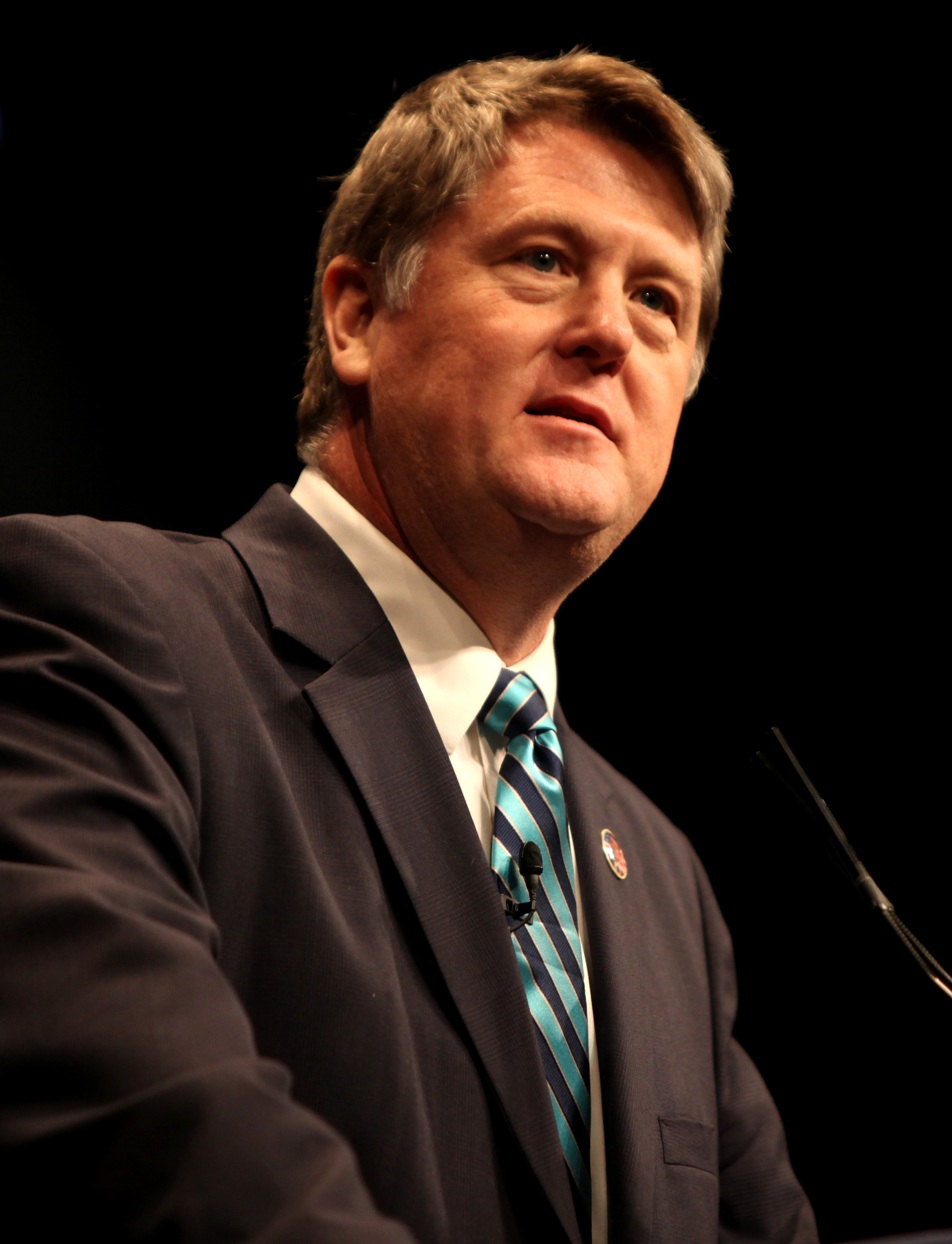
- Born: Floyd Gregory Brown; March 10, 1961 (age 65); Bremerton, Washington, U.S.
- Education: University of Washington
- Occupation: Political consultant
- Writing career
- Genre: Non-fiction
- Subject: Politics

Floyd Gregory Brown (born March 10, 1961) is an American author, speaker, and media commentator. He is formerly the CEO of USA Radio Network. Brown founded the conservative website Western Journalism in 2008. Brown in his early career worked as a political consultant and conducted opposition research for political campaigns. Brown is noteworthy for founding Citizens United in 1988 and for his introduction of the "Willie Horton" television ad during the 1988 presidential election campaign.

== Early life and education ==
The son of a sawmill worker, and the grandson of a member of the Industrial Workers of the World, Brown grew up in the Pacific Northwest in a family of Democrats with 100-year-old roots in the area. He graduated from Olympia High School in Olympia, Washington, in 1979, and from the University of Washington. He holds a bachelor's degree in economics.

Brown credits meeting Ronald Reagan at a Masonic Temple in 1976 for sparking his interest in politics when he was 15 years old. He is married to NYT Bestselling author Mary Beth Brown, author of The Faith of Ronald Reagan, with whom he has three children.

In 1992, Brown was quoted in the Washington Times:

I have a sense of what connects with people like me. We're not culturally Republicans. We're not libertarians. We're not neo-conservatives or former liberals. We're just old-fashioned, blue-collar social conservatives. These are people who couldn't care less about politics, want to be left alone by government, but if their country calls for them to fight abroad, will. You win elections by cultivating people like me.

== Political activities ==
=== Citizens United ===
In 1988 Brown founded Citizens United. Several Brown-organized campaigns have been studied for their effectiveness; these include the effort to secure the confirmation of Judge Clarence Thomas, and the independent campaigns against Michael Dukakis and Bill Clinton. The anti-Dukakis effort produced the famous "Willie Horton" commercial.

Brown and Citizens United worked on behalf of the nomination of Clarence Thomas to the U.S. Supreme Court. At the time, Brown told the New York Times, "What people don't understand is how bitter conservatives are about Bork," referring to Robert Bork, a conservative federal appellate judge and former Yale law professor nominated by Ronald Reagan to the Supreme Court in 1987 and rejected by the Senate.

In a 2007 CNN documentary, Broken Government: Campaign Killers, journalist Campbell Brown, who is not related to Floyd Brown, interviewed him briefly on the subject of the Willie Horton ad, but not about a racy ad with a toll-free number that listeners could call to hear a recording of Gennifer Flowers, a woman who had been the subject of inquiries into President Bill Clinton. Campbell Brown attributed the Flowers ad to David Bossie rather than Floyd Brown, prompting Citizens United to threaten a lawsuit, and to distinguish between its activities, and those of Floyd Brown, the "true" author of the Flowers ad.

=== Republican Party ===
Brown has been active in Republican Party campaigns, and was a delegate to both the 1996 and 2000 national conventions. In 1996 he served on the Republican National Convention Platform Committee. He has been an advisor and consultant to the presidential campaigns of George W. Bush, Bob Dole and Steve Forbes. He was Midwest Regional Director of the Dole for President campaign in 1988, managing campaigns in Iowa, Minnesota, South Dakota and Nebraska. In 2016 he served on the National Finance Committee of Mike Huckabee's presidential campaign.

=== 1992 Bush presidential campaign ===
In 1992, Brown headed the Presidential Victory Committee, which backed the candidacy of George H. W. Bush. In March 1992, the Bush campaign sought to halt the committee's efforts to raise money. Bobby Burchfield, acting as Bush campaign counsel, wrote to Brown, "Your group has neither asked for nor received permission to solicit funds using the name of George Bush. The president strongly disapproves of this misleading use of his name and reputation."

CBS Evening News reported that Brown harassed the family of Susann Coleman, a former law student of Bush's opponent Bill Clinton. Coleman had committed suicide, and Brown was attempting to investigate a rumor that she had had an affair with Clinton. David Bossie reportedly stalked the Coleman family while working for Brown. In April 1992, 30 news organizations received "an anonymous and untraceable letter" by fax "claiming Clinton had had an affair with a former law student who committed suicide 15 years ago." Floyd Brown attempted to investigate any connection between Clinton and Coleman's suicide.

Two days after the CBS charges aired, the Bush-Quayle campaign filed a complaint with the Federal Election Commission against Brown, seeking to distance itself from his tactics, and calling Brown and his associates "the lowest forms of life".

=== Whitewater controversy ===
Brown figured prominently in two ways in the Whitewater controversy of the Clinton presidential administration. Brown was investigating Clinton. Brown was contacted by David Hale, a municipal judge facing indictment for fraud, then functioning as a paid informant for the FBI. Under the auspices of Citizens United, Brown issued letters to 100,000 donors to Citizens United, asking for money and saying that he had proof that Clinton had engaged "in a massive cover-up and conspiracy to obstruct justice" in the investigations surrounding the Whitewater controversy. At the same time that Brown was investigating the Clintons, he was using the tax-exempt status of Citizens United to acquire funds, urging his donors to fill out an "emergency impeachment" survey, utilizing a push-poll technique. Brown's fundraising literature said, "Our top investigator, David Bossie, is on the inside directing the probe as Special Assistant to U.S. Senator Lauch Faircloth on the U.S. Senate Whitewater Committee."

=== 2008 McCain-Obama presidential race ===
Brown was a co-founder in 2007, with James V. Lacey, Tim Kelley, and Michael Reagan, of the National Campaign Fund in support of GOP presidential candidates Arizona Sen. John McCain and former New York City Mayor Rudy Giuliani, and in opposition to Democratic presidential candidate Hillary Clinton. An affiliated 527 called Citizens for a Safe and Prosperous America was also formed in late 2007. ExposeObama.com is an anti-Barack Obama website created by Brown and his National Campaign Fund. The website purports to show that the Democratic nominee has inconsistent positions regarding abortion, taxes and other issues, in addition to being soft on crime and on what the site calls "Islamo Fascism". The website has been criticized in media accounts for "mudslinging" and misrepresenting Obama's positions.

In the spring of 2008, working for The National Campaign Fund, Floyd Brown launched what he called "the most internet-intensive effort for an ad debut ever" to disseminate via what he claimed was three to five million emails to conservatives the implication that Barack Obama had been "soft" on crime as a state senator in Illinois before his presidential candidacy. The initiative was funded by a political action committee calling itself the "National Campaign Fund," which had $14,027 in the bank at the end of March 2008. Other Brown-established groups to raise funds in this effort include a 527 group, Citizens for a Safe and Prosperous America. Brown also uses a 501(c)(4) non-profit to raise funds for the Policy Issues Institute. Brown made appearances to promote his ad and his company on a news network, Fox News, In response to the attack ad, Newsweek published a report on the ad, saying it was the attempt of "a conservative ad man striving to regain his Willie Horton notoriety" and directed readers to factcheck.org to get information on Obama's voting record. The report includes a swipe at MSNBC's Chris Matthews for airing the ad continuously, pointing to Brown's strategy of getting "free" air time for ads by making them controversial.

Brown's fundraising strength is diminished by the hesitance of large donors to leave themselves vulnerable to the legal difficulties encountered by donors to "swiftboat" ad efforts in the 2004 election cycle, and to new laws which curtail some of the more offensive content of political ads by 527 groups. As some of the contributors to the "swiftboat" ads in 2004 faced stiff fines from the Federal Election Commission, Brown has refrained from operating out of 527 groups and opted for the political action committee platform and budgeting from small donors. Brown's stated goal is to release one new attack ad every two weeks, and released an advertisement asserting that Obama was registered as a Muslim student in Indonesia, and that he attended an Indonesian school that taught Islam as a child. The claim has been refuted by the Obama campaign. As of March 2008, Brown had raised $50,000, and spent $5,000 on actual ad buys, also posting the ad on YouTube and other public platforms.

In August 2008 Brown teamed up with writer and entrepreneur Jerome Corsi to promote Corsi's book Obama Nation via viral web campaigns and email marketing.

== Young America's Foundation ==
From 2001 until 2006 Brown served as the executive director of the West Coast office of Young America's Foundation. YAF is the largest right-wing campus organization in the U.S. It operates the Reagan Ranch, also known as Rancho del Cielo, and conducts conferences, seminars, internships and disseminates educational materials nationwide. As executive director Brown oversaw the preservation of the historic Reagan Ranch and the building of the 20 million dollar Reagan Ranch Center in downtown Santa Barbara, California.

== Author and political commentator ==
Brown is the author of Slick Willie: Why America Cannot Trust Bill Clinton, published in 1992. Brown often claims publicly that the book reached "best-selling" status and sold 200,000 copies, but the New York Times determined that the sales figures were only 50,000. Brown co-authored Prince Albert: The Life and Lies of Al Gore, a book about Al Gore's environmental work, with David Bossie. Brown also authored Say the Right Thing, a collection of conservative sayings.

Brown has written extensively for many publications including the San Francisco Chronicle, the Washington Times, National Review, and Human Events. As a commentator, he has appeared on numerous network and cable TV shows including: CNN's Crossfire, the CBS Evening News, ABC's Primetime, NBC's Today show, FOX News, MSNBC and more. From 1995 until 2000 he hosted his own talk radio show on Seattle's KVI 570 AM.

== Real estate investor and financial consultant ==
Floyd Brown from 2005 until 2008 was a paid consultant for The Oxford Club, a "membership only" organization that reports it has a membership of 65,000 in "over" 110 countries. The mission of the organization is to assist members to "create a financial legacy for their families that is shielded from excessive taxation, seizure, fraud, and inflation." The Oxford Club sponsors conferences and travel for investors, and is based in Baltimore, Maryland. It touts its "special alerts" to prompt members to pick certain stocks to buy, and to consult its "Investment University" series for advice from Brown and other consultants, to learn "what universities cannot teach you." The Oxford club compares its exclusivity with that of Skull and Bones at Yale, and charges an annual membership fee of $79.00. In return, members are promised "insider information." In promotional materials, The Oxford Club lists its accomplishments as helping various members to earn 234% return on investment in a Chinese metal producer, 171% per cent on a commercial property trust, 107% on "the soon-to-be-leader in Chinese life insurance", and 394% on a major pharmaceutical research firm.

On April 1, 2008, Brown appeared on Fox News Channel's Neil Cavuto business program, described only as "real estate investor," in a segment titled "New Foreclosure Bailout: Do Homeowners Really Need it?" and stated, "We agree in the fact that the government made this mess. They clearly helped foster it. I think Alan Greenspan kept rates too low after the 2001 recession and that caused way too much liquidity to flow into the markets..."

In May 2008, Brown recommended investment in Dodge & Cox, a mutual fund that had recently offered a rare opening to new investors. Dodge and Cox held shares in AIG, among others.
