= Marburg Mansion =

Historic house in Baltimore, Maryland

- U.S. Historic district – Contributing property
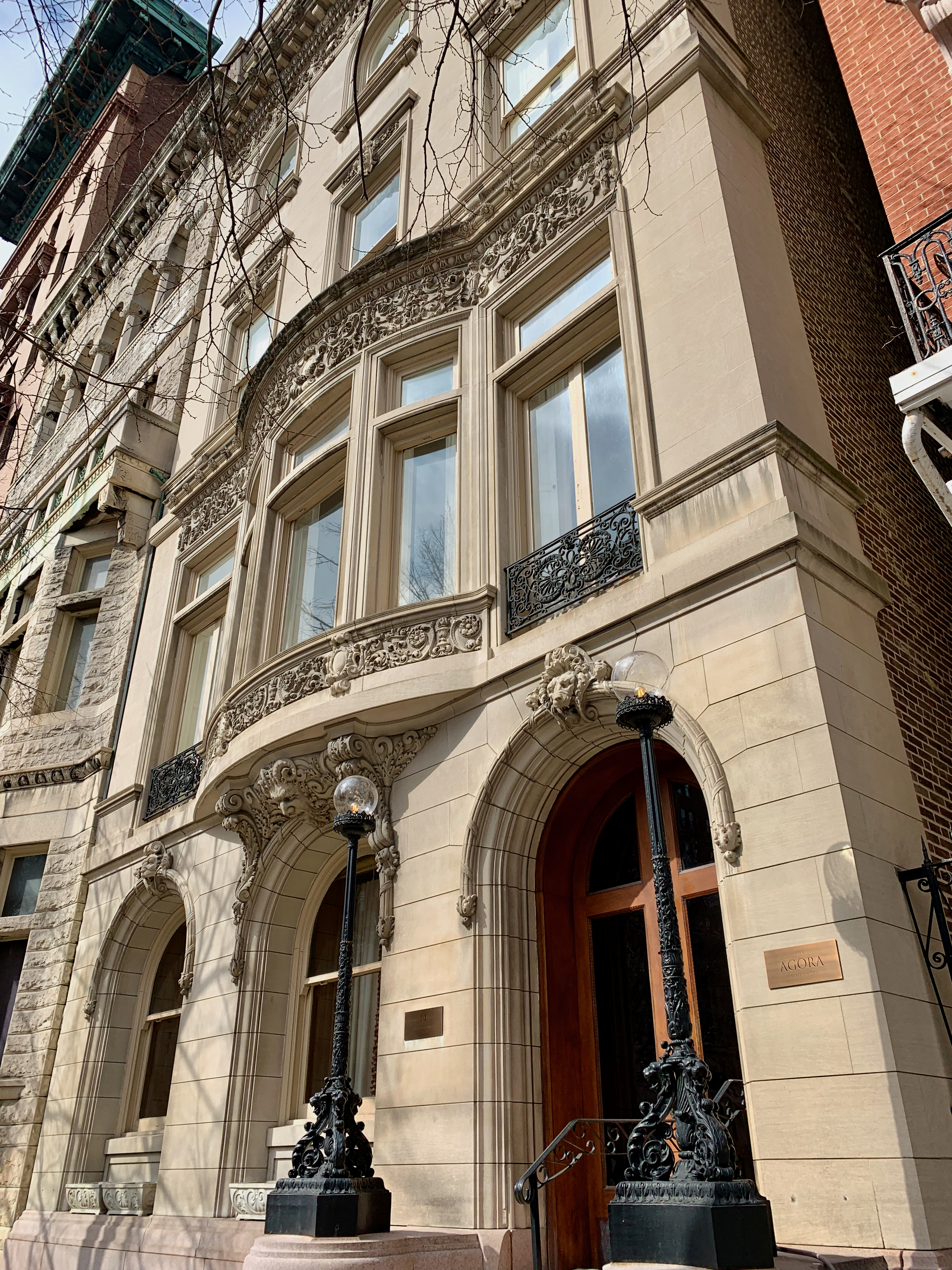
- 14 West Mount Vernon Place (2002)
- Location: Baltimore, Maryland
- Built: 1847
- Part of: Mount Vernon Place Historic District (ID71001037)
- Building details
- Alternative names: 14 West Mount Vernon Place; Theodore Marburg mansion; Marburg-Iliff Mansion

General information
- Renovated: 1890s

Technical details
- Floor count: 5

The Marburg Mansion is a historic five-story townhouse at 14 West Mount Vernon Place in the Mount Vernon neighborhood of Baltimore, Maryland. Built in 1847 for Mr. and Mrs. George Tiffany, in 1897 it became the residence of diplomat and peace advocate Theodore Marburg. Through the late nineteenth and into the mid twentieth century, the mansion served as a venue for civic, cultural, diplomatic, and social gatherings, including meetings connected to peace and internationalist organizations. It was later adapted for medical offices and was used by ophthalmology practices associated with Charles E. Iliff, III, M.D. and the Wilmer Eye Institute of Johns Hopkins Hospital.

== History ==
The mansion was originally built in 1847 for Mr. and Mrs. George Tiffany. In 1866, Mr. and Mrs. George Small purchased the property from the Tiffanys. Theodore Marburg purchased the property in 1897 and added one and one-half stories and a new façade as part of an extended renovation.

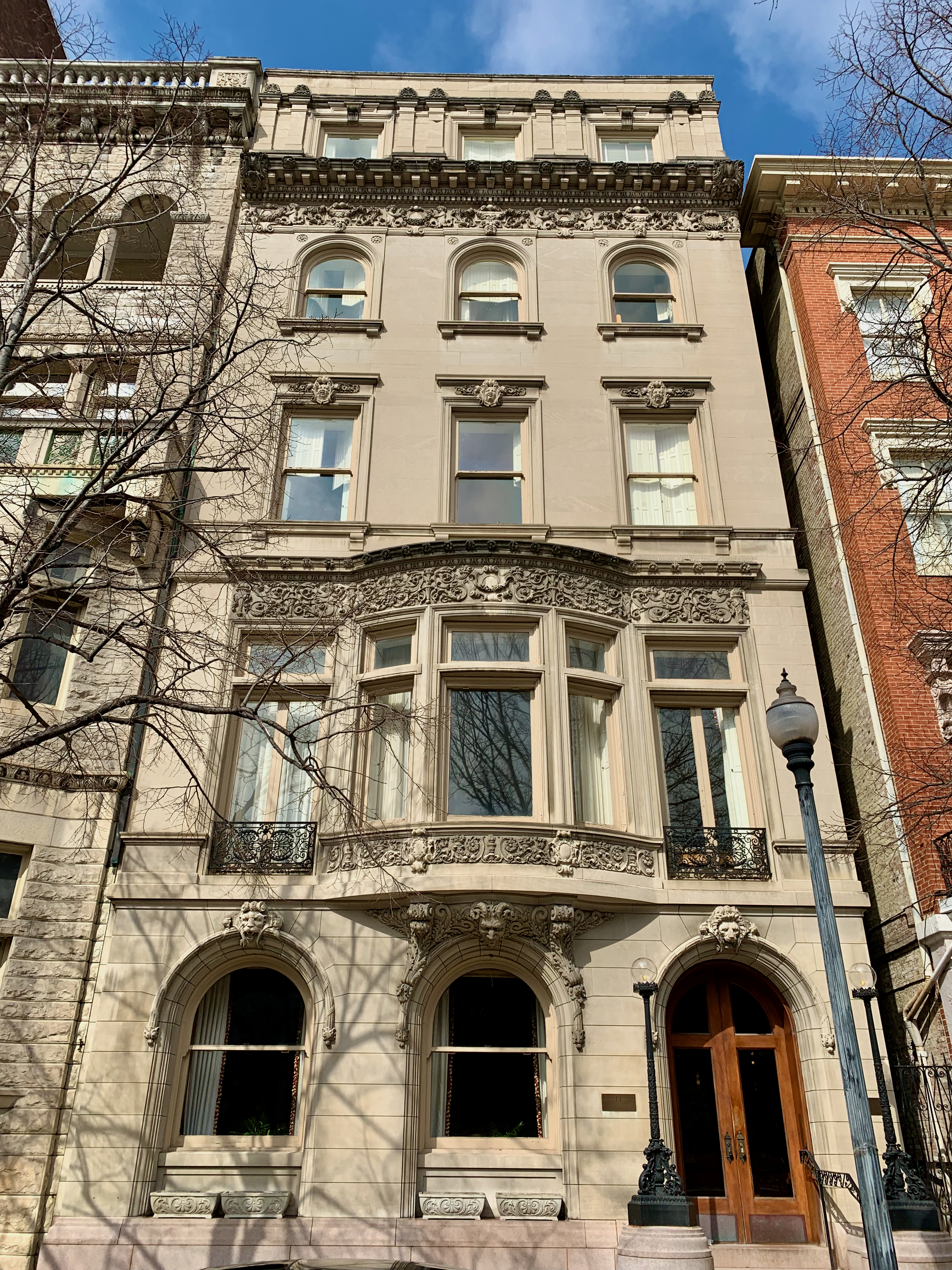
Photograph of 14 West Mount Vernon Place showing its five-story height (2002).

The mansion hosted large receptions, dinners, and dances and was used for meetings involving civic and cultural organizations. It also served as a site of peace-movement organizing and internationalist activity, including planning meetings for the Third National Peace Congress in 1911 and the drafting of covenants to the League of Nations in Ambassador Theodore Marburg’s study, where figures such as Woodrow Wilson and William Howard Taft were among those received. In 1924, Sir Willoughby and Lady Dickinson of London stayed as guests of Mr. and Mrs. Marburg at 14 West Mount Vernon Place.

Marburg died in March 1946, and probate reporting described the residence and its contents in estate coverage following his death.

In 1955, the building was acquired by ophthalmologist Charles E. Iliff, III, M.D., of the Wilmer Eye Institute of Johns Hopkins Hospital, and was used as medical offices. The mansion remained a private-practice location for Iliff and related practitioners into the late twentieth century.

In 1994, Agora, Inc. purchased the building from the Iliff family. The building is part of Agora's Mount Vernon office campus, a collection of historic buildings used as offices.

== Architecture and interior ==
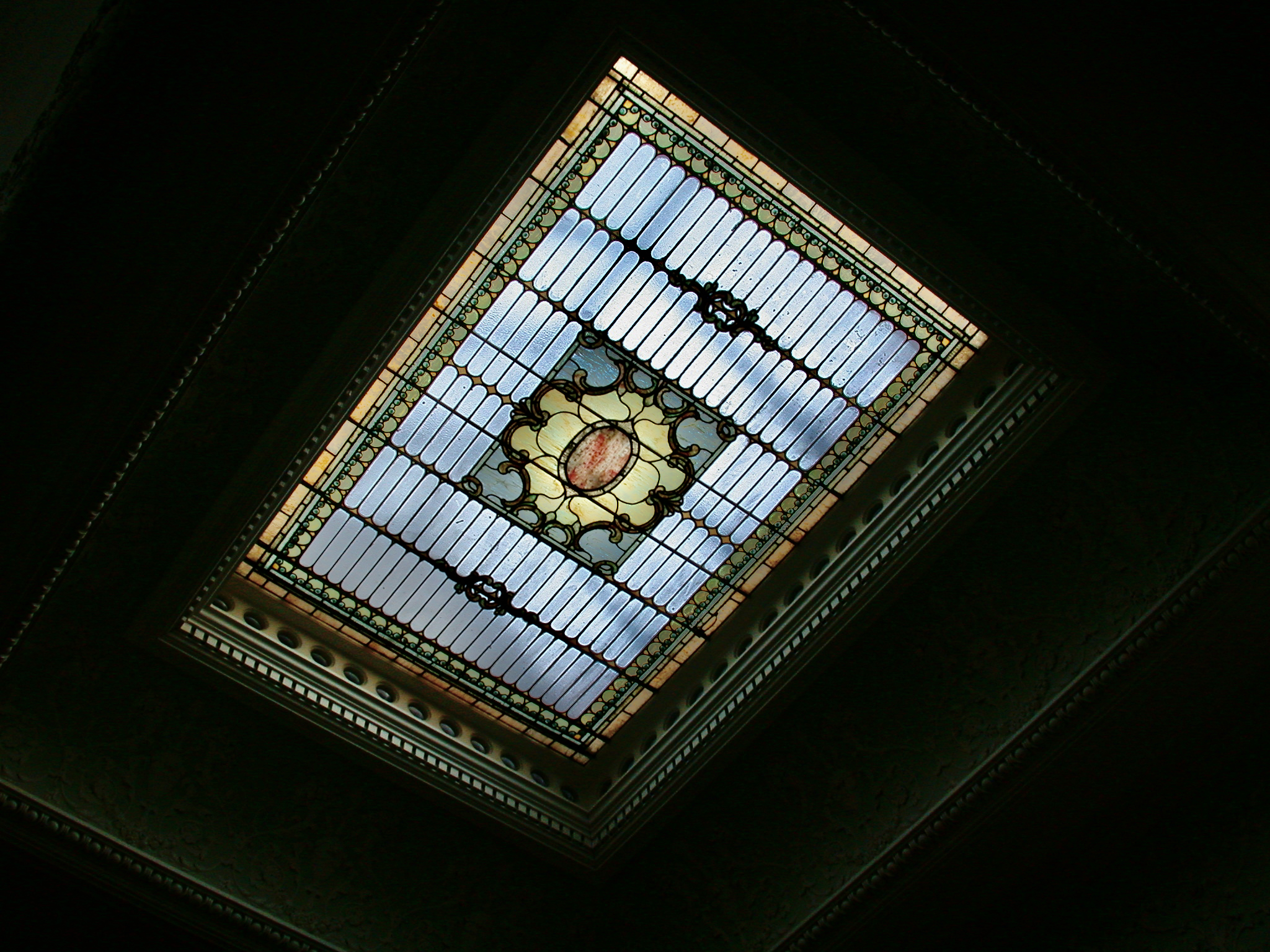
Photograph of the stairwell skylight (2002).

The building contains approximately 21,000 sq ft (2,000 m^{2}) and includes 15 rooms and a finished basement. Interior features include high ceilings, ornamental plasterwork, carved woodwork with leaded-glass elements, parquet floors, and a stained-glass skylight over the stairway. It was the first home in Baltimore to be equipped with a hydraulic elevator, later enclosed and converted to electric operation.

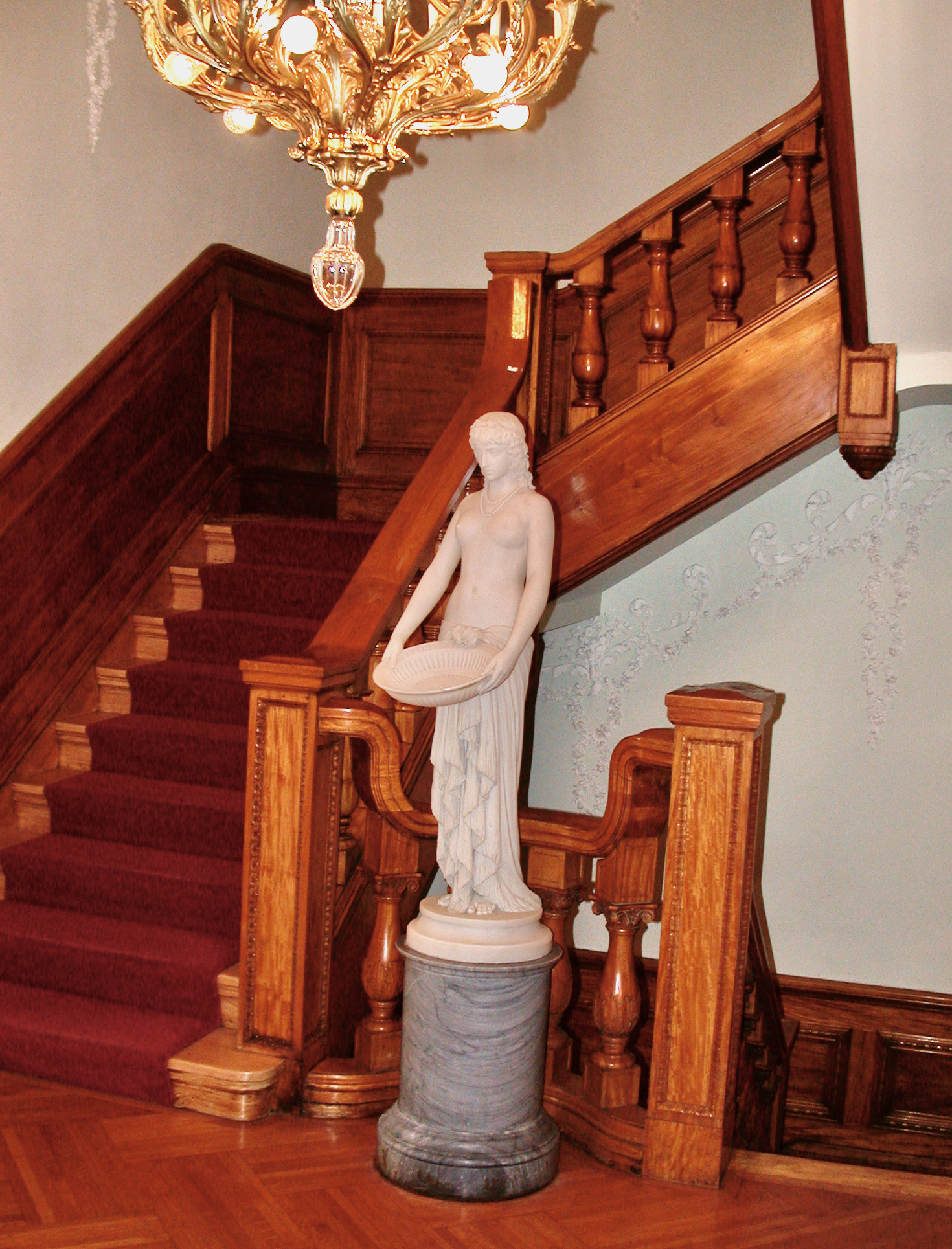
Photograph of a marble stair-landing statue (2002).

== See also ==
- Mount Vernon, Baltimore
- Theodore Marburg
- Agora, Inc.
