= Lila Rajiva =

American writer

Lila Rajiva is an American writer. She has undergraduate degrees in economics and English as well as a master's degree from Johns Hopkins University, where she did doctoral work in international relations and political philosophy. She has taught at the University of Maryland, Baltimore County.

Rajiva has been published in Endervidualism, Himal South Asian, India West, The Hindu, Outlook India, Forbes, The Washington Post, CounterPunch, Dissident Voice, Doublestandards.org, Lewrockwell.com, The Daily Reckoning and MRZine. She has also contributed chapters and articles to several academic texts and journals.

In 2005, Rajiva authored The Language of Empire: Abu Ghraib and the American Media, a study of propaganda which examines the place of Iraqi prisoner torture in U.S. culture and politics. Rajiva co-authored Mobs, Messiahs, and Markets with Bill Bonner, which details mass delusions in the markets and politics and explains why they continually arise. The book was awarded the GetAbstract International Book Award for 2008.
