= Agora Financial =

Publishing company, based in Baltimore, Maryland, US

- Type: Publishing company
- Industry: Publishing
- Genre: Financial advice
- Founded: 1979; 47 years ago
- Founder: Bill Bonner
- Headquarters: Baltimore, MD, United States
- Parent: The Agora
- Website: agorafinancial.com

Agora Financial is an American publishing company, based in Baltimore, Maryland, that produces print and email publications, books, and conferences directed toward providing financial advice, commentary, and analysis.

== History and executive leadership ==
A subsidiary of The Agora network, Agora Financial was founded in 1979 by financial writer and essayist Bill Bonner, the author of Empire of Debt and Financial Reckoning Day. Bonner's co-author Addison Wiggin is the executive publisher of Agora Financial. Wiggin served as executive producer and co-writer on the 2008 feature-length documentary film I.O.U.S.A.. A film about the growth of the U.S. national debt, I.O.U.S.A. was based on Empire of Debt, and was financed by Agora Entertainment, another Agora, Inc. subsidiary.

The company publishes a number of financial newsletters focused on advising investors on making money in energy, metals, emerging technologies, and small-cap stocks, including the Daily Reckoning, Outstanding Investments, and Capital & Crisis. Agora financial also founded the Richebacher Society, a group focused on continuing the work of the late economist Kurt Richebacher.

Byron King, editor of two of Agora Financial's publications, Energy & Scarcity Investor and Outstanding Investments, has served as an oil industry analyst in the media, specifically in the wake of British Petroleum's oil spill in the Gulf of Mexico. Other members of the Agora Financial staff have provided analysis for CNBC, Fox Business, and Bloomberg. In March 2011, Agora Financial acquired Laissez Faire Books, a libertarian bookseller based in New York. Established in 1972, the bookseller publishes and distributes libertarian books, with a focus on economics and finance. Jeffrey Tucker, author of Bourbon for Breakfast: Living Outside the Statist Quo, and It’s a Jetsons World: Private Miracles and Public Crimes, as well as former editorial vice president of the Ludwig von Mises Institute, was hired as Laissez Faire's executive editor.

== Agora financial publications ==
- Breakthrough Technology Alert – Edited by Ray Blanco, looks for investment opportunities in new technologies.
- Capital & Crisis - Edited by Chris Mayer, this newsletter explores the topic of global value investing.
- Daily Reckoning – The publisher's flagship newsletter, the daily publication discusses economic issues, investment ideas, and market analysis.
- Energy & Scarcity Investor – Edited by Byron King, focuses on companies exploring new areas of resource development.
- Lifetime Income Report – Edited by Neil George, the newsletter is focused on dividend growth.
- Mayer’s Special Situations – Edited by Chris Mayer, the monthly publication discusses unique small-cap investment opportunities.
- Options Hotline – Edited by Steve Sarnoff, the publication looks for potential investment opportunities in the stock market.
- Outstanding Investments – Edited by Byron King, the publication focuses on investments in energy, mining, and precious metals. The publication was ranked #1 in overall return from 2000-2010 by Hulbert Financial Digest.
- Penny Sleuth – A daily newsletter edited by Jonas Elmerraji, with commentary and analysis on small-cap stocks.
- Penny Stock Fortunes – Co-edited by Jonas Elmerraji and Greg Guenthner, advises on investing in penny stocks.
- STORM Signals – Co-edited by Jonas Elmerraji and Greg Guenthner, it makes recommendations on using market volatility for investment opportunities.
- Strategic Short Report – Edited by Dan Amoss, discusses investment strategy based on predictions of the directions various companies are headed.
- Technology Profits Confidential – Edited by Ray Blanco, discusses investment opportunities in emerging technologies.
- Total Income Alert – Edited by Neil George, discusses varied investment opportunities as an income source.
- 25 Cent Trader - Edited by Nomi Prins, discusses options trading by placing trades on usually Monday or Tuesday.
- FDA Trader - Edited by Ray Blanco, the strategy looks for breakout moves in the medical markets.
- Buyout Millionaires Club - Co-edited by Zach Scheidt and Jonathan Rodriguez, it looks to identify the market’s most compelling takeover targets before a deal is announced.
- Daily Double Club - Edited by Alan Knuckman, it looks for profit opportunities to double your money daily.
- Weekly Fortunes - Edited by Tim Sykes, it is a bi-weekly newsletter that focuses on penny stocks.

== Agora Financial Investment Symposium ==
Since 1999, the company has hosted the annual Agora Financial Investment Symposium. Held in Vancouver, British Columbia, the conference is Agora Financial's largest event of the year. The conference brings together a large number of speakers discussing emerging financial trends, as well as panels and debates. Past speakers have included Steve Forbes, Jim Rogers, Doug Casey, Nassim Nicholas Taleb, and James Howard Kunstler. Each year, the conference is built around a central theme, with "A Tale of Two Americas" the theme selected for 2013.

== Options Hotline and 9/11 ==
In the investigations following 9/11, the SEC determined that an unusual number of investors had purchased put options on American Airlines immediately prior to September 11, 2001. Further investigation found Agora's Options Hotline newsletter and its editor Steve Sarnoff as responsible for faxing some 2,000 subscribers the recommendation to buy put options on American Airlines on September 9, 2001. Sarnoff was investigated for insider trading with the SEC eventually concluding “all suspicious trades were checked out, and the SEC satisfied itself that the traders had no advance knowledge of 9/11.”

== FTC suit ==
In October 2019 the Federal Trade Commission sued Agora Financial for promising a "100 percent success rate" cure for Type 2 diabetes within 28 days, without any changes to diet or exercise, if customers would buy Agora's books, newsletters, and other products. The suit also addressed a bogus "Congressional Checks" or "Republican Checks" scheme where customers who were Republicans could receive government backed checks ranging from $900 to over tens of thousands of dollars and to get the information on the checks customers would need to pay $4.95 for shipping for a book, Congress’ Secret $1.17 Trillion Giveaway, and subscribe to Agora's Lifetime Income Report newsletter, which costs $99 a year. The book however contained only information on dividend investing and nothing about free Congressional checks.

In February 2021 Agora Financial and some of its affiliates agreed to pay more than $2 million to settle the FTC charges. The FTC reported Agora tricked seniors into buying materials that falsely promised a cure for type 2 diabetes or promoted a phony plan to help them cash in on a government-affiliated check program.
