= Jolyon Connell =

British journalist and publisher

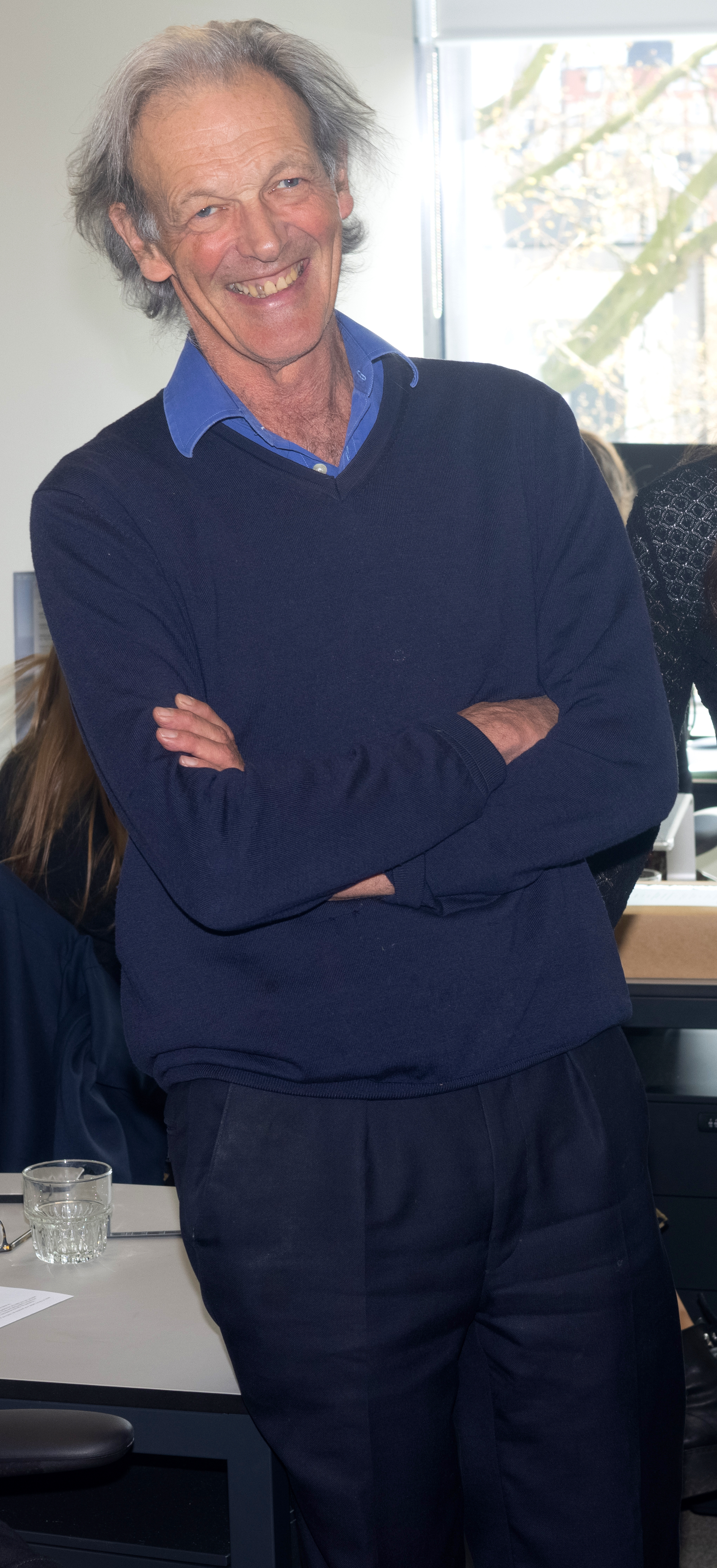
Jolyon Connell in 2021

Jolyon Connell is a former Sunday Telegraph and Sunday Times journalist who left Fleet Street to found The Week in 1995.

== Education ==
Connell has a first class degree in English from the University of St Andrews and an honorary doctorate from the same university.

== Career ==
Connell first began working in journalist in the 1970s as a trainee reporter at The Press and Journal in Aberdeen. He later travelled to London for several months to research and publish a book called Fraud: the Amazing Career of Dr Savundra. Several months later he was offered a job at the Sunday Times.

Connell's other business interests include MoneyWeek, a British financial magazine which he founded in 2000. In 2010 he founded Connell Guides, a publishing company specialising in guide books for GCSE and A Level Literature students.
