= The Western Journal =

American news website

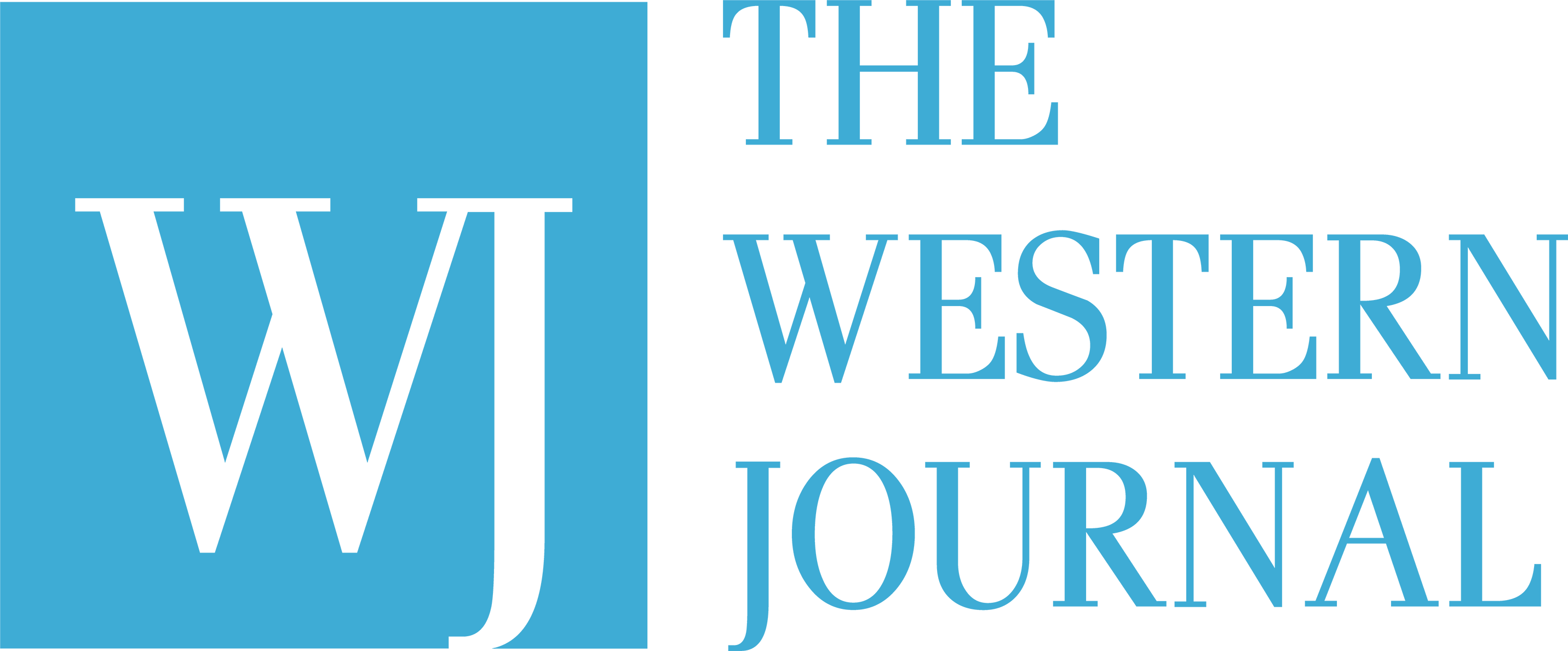
- Type: Online newspaper
- Owner(s): Liftable Media, Inc.
- Founder: Floyd Brown
- Editor-in-chief: George Upper
- Founded: 2008; 18 years ago
- Political alignment: Conservative
- Language: English
- Headquarters: Phoenix, Arizona, U.S.
- Country: United States
- Website: westernjournal.com

The Western Journal, previously known as Western Journalism, is an American conservative news and political website, based in Phoenix, Arizona. The website was founded in 2008 by the conservative political consultant and activist Floyd Brown. The masthead at the top of each page includes the slogan "Defending and Advancing Western Civilization" directly under its name. It is overtly conservative Christian, as stated on its "About" page: "The Western Journal upholds traditional Christian values as articulated in the Bible."

== History ==
Western Journalism founder Floyd Brown also founded the political action committee Citizens United and served as executive director of the Young America's Foundation.

The site was acquired by Liftable Media, Inc. in 2014, which also owns the political opinion websites Conservative Tribune and Liberty Alliance, and the Christian website Liftable.com. It also owns and provides content to dozens of conservative Facebook pages.

Newsweek reported that the site has grown from receiving 1,000 page views a day in 2009 to more than 1 million during 2016.

In a 2016 story on how fake news spreads on social media, The Intercept reported that "Thanks to views sourced largely to referrals from Facebook, Brown's websites now outrank web traffic going to news outlets such as the Wall Street Journal, CBS News, and NPR, according to data compiled by Alexa".

The company changed its name in 2018 to The Western Journal, hired trained copy editors, and introduced a corrections page. In 2018 the CEO of Liftable Media, which publishes Conservative Tribune and The Western Journal, told BuzzFeed News he would be contacting True Pundit to demand it cease and desist "stealing the first 10 paragraphs or so of our content".

The New York Times reported in 2019 that the site had more than 36 million readers and followers on Facebook.

== Reception ==
Western Journalism previously stated it featured "conservative, libertarian, free market and pro-family writers and broadcasters" and seeks to provide "God-honoring" content. In practice, according to The New York Times, this philosophy, in which "tradition-minded patriots face ceaseless assault by anti-Christian bigots, diseased migrants and race hustlers concocting hate crimes," results in "a torrent of sensationalized, misleading, or entirely made-up stories, often aimed at Muslims and immigrants." Because of negative rulings by fact-checking sites and user trust surveys, Western Journalism was blacklisted by Google and Apple News, and by 2017 its Facebook traffic declined to near zero.

In February 2019, The Western Journal published an article which alleged "Climate Change 'Heat Records' Are a Huge Data Manipulation." Scientists criticized the article, saying it was deceptive and that it contradicted existing research. The Western Journal subsequently retracted the article. In November 2021, a study by the Center for Countering Digital Hate described The Western Journal as being among "ten fringe publishers" that together were responsible for nearly 70 percent of Facebook user interactions with content that supported climate change denial. Facebook disputed the study's methodology.
