= Mark M. Ford =

American film producer

- Other names: Mark Ford, Michael Masterson
- Education: Queens College (B.A.); University of Michigan (M.A.)
- Occupations: Author, entrepreneur, philanthropist, investor, publisher, consultant
- Website: MarkFord.net

Mark Morgan Ford a.k.a. Michael Masterson, is an American author, entrepreneur, publisher, real estate investor, filmmaker, art collector, and consultant to the direct marketing and publishing industries.

Ford is the author of more than two dozen books and hundreds of essays on entrepreneurship, wealth-building, economics, and copywriting. He has also written four books of poetry, a collection of short stories (Dreaming of Tigers), and a book on word use titled Words that Work.

Much of Ford's business writing is published under the pen name Michael Masterson. His books, Automatic Wealth and Ready, Fire, Aim, were recognized on the Wall Street Journal and New York Times Best Sellers lists.

Ford is active in real estate development both in the United States and abroad.

Since 1993, he has been the chief growth strategist for Agora, Inc., a publisher of newsletters and books.

In 2014, Ford co-wrote the comedic coming-of-age film After Midnight with Steve Cabrera.

== Early life and education ==
Ford was born in Brooklyn, New York. His parents, Frank Ford and Joan O'Byrne Ford, were professors of literature and communications, respectively, at Molloy College in Rockville Centre.

In 1962, at the age of 12, Ford launched his first business, a kitchen-table publishing company that produced and sold satirical pamphlets, titled as Excuses for the Amateur. He sold these for a nickel to his classmates. Also in 1962, Ford wrote his first poem.

He graduated from South Side High School in 1968 and earned his Bachelor of Arts from Queens College (CUNY) in 1973. In 1975, he received a Master of Arts from the University of Michigan. He completed his PhD coursework at Catholic University in 1977, but never finished his thesis.

== Career ==
According to TheStreet.com, Ford "launched dozens of successful businesses in several different industries, some of which have grown well beyond $100 million."

In 1976, Ford enlisted in the Peace Corps and spent two years in Africa teaching English literature and philosophy at the University of Chad in Ndjamena. He authored a book about Chadian culture and a newsletter for Peace Corps volunteers. In 1977, he married Kathryn Fitzgerald.

In 1980, Ford took a job at a start-up publishing company in Boca Raton, Florida.

In an interview with Boca Raton News, Ford recalled that the first newsletters they published were typeset and printed with outdated equipment but that the quality of the print didn't seem to bother the customers. The production facilities were improved as revenues grew.

In 1983 Ford was promoted to vice president in charge of marketing and product development. He executed a campaign to launch a new line of newsletter companies targeted to consumers, covering topics from health to travel to investing to astrology and gambling. In 1983 Ford wrote his first advertising campaign for an investment club called The Royal Society of Lichtenstein that covered wealth building, tax deferral strategies, and personal liberty.

By the early 1990s the combined revenues of those companies exceeded $135 million in annual revenues.

In the early 1990s, several of Ford's protégés created a correspondence school to teach the fundamentals of writing for the direct marketing industry called American Writers and Artists, Inc.

Aside from courses on writing advertising copy, AWAI also offers self-study programs on web marketing, resume writing, graphic design, publishing, travel, and photography. Ford, under the pen name Michael Masterson, created the Accelerated Program for Six-Figure Copywriting.

Ford has been a real estate investor and developer for more than 30 years. He currently has investments in approximately 40 real estate development companies and developments including a 1000-home residential housing project in Panama and a 3,000-acre resort on the west coast of Nicaragua.

Ford is the co-founder of Palm Beach Research Group. His other business ventures include: Lion's Kill LLC, Ford Fine Art LLC, and Paradise Palms of Delray Beach.

== Published books ==
Mark Ford, (also identified as Mark Morgan Ford or Michael Masterson) has authored and co-authored books on marketing, copy-writing, and entrepreneurship. Some of these books include:

- Automatic Wealth: The Six Steps to Financial Independence (John Wiley & Sons) (ISBN 9780471710271)
- Seven Years to Seven Figures: The Fast-Track Plan to Becoming a Millionaire (John Wiley & Sons) (ISBN 9780470267554)
- Automatic Wealth for Grads and Anyone Else Just Starting Out (John Wiley & Sons) (ISBN 9780471786764)
- Confessions of a Self-Made Millionaire (Early to Rise) (ASIN B001PIRVPI)
- Changing the Channel (John Wiley & Sons with MaryEllen Tribby) (ISBN 9780470538807)
- The Architecture of Persuasion (American Writers & Artists, Inc.) (ISBN 9780982150009)
- Power and Persuasion: How to Command Success in Business and Your Personal Life (John Wiley & Sons) (ISBN 9780471786771)
- Ready, Fire, Aim: Zero to $100 Million in No Time Flat (John Wiley & Sons) (ISBN 9780470182024)
- Great Leads: The Six Easiest Ways to Start Any Sales Message (American Writers & Artists with John Forde) (ASIN B007I6MEUI)
- Copy Logic (American Writers & Artists, Inc. with Mike Palmer) (ISBN 9780982150016)
- The Pledge: Your Master Plan for an Abundant Life (John Wiley & Sons) (ISBN 9780470922408)
- The Reluctant Entrepreneur (John Wiley & Sons) (ISBN 9781118178447)
- Words That Work (American Writers & Artists, Inc.)
- Persuasion: The Subtle Art of Getting What You Want (American Writers & Artists Inc.) (ISBN 9780982150047)
- The Big Book of Wealth Creation: From Your First Penny to Your First Million in 7 Years or Less (Mark Ford with Special Contributions from the Palm Beach Research Group) (ISBN 9780996363228)
- Living Rich: How to Live as well as a Billionaire on a Middle Class Budget (Mark Morgan Form) (ISBN 9780988336247)
- Wealth Planning for Freelancers: How to Parley your Freelance Income into a Multi-Million Dollar Retirement (Mark Morgan Ford)
- Making the Most of Your Time (Mark Morgan Ford)
- Your Best Holiday Season Ever (Michael Masterson, Presented by Early to Rise)

In 2012 Ford published a poetry collection called Back and Out Again (Cap & Bells Press) under his full name, Mark Morgan Ford, so as to distinguish his poetry from Mark Ford, a better-known poet.

- Back and Out Again (Mark Morgan Ford) (ISBN 9780615515250)
- Lexis in Wolf’s Clothing (Mark Morgan Ford) (ISBN 9780988336285)
- It is Raining Lovely, Raining (Mark Morgan Ford) (ISBN 9780988336254)

== Controversy ==
In 1991 the U.S. Postal Inspection Service seized $6.6 million in bank accounts held by Ford and his partner, Joel Nadel, for allegedly violating civil mail-fraud and money-laundering statutes. The case was eventually settled in November 1993 without Ford and Nadel admitting or agreeing to wrongdoing. The government repaid Ford and Nadel more than $3 million, plus interest, and a compensation fund was established.
