= The Oxford Club =

Baltimore-based investment society

- Company type: Private
- Industry: Publishing
- Founded: 1989 in Baltimore, Maryland
- Founder: Bill Bonner & Mark Ford
- Headquarters: Baltimore, Maryland
- Key people: Todd Skousen, CEO and Executive Publisher
- Owner: The Agora
- Website: https://oxfordclub.com/

The Oxford Club is an independent financial research publisher and a private network of investors and entrepreneurs, headquartered in Baltimore, Maryland. It has more than 120,000 members in 100 countries. The Oxford Club also hosts financial seminars, symposiums, and overseas investment excursions.

The Oxford Club publishes investment research services which includes monthly newsletters highlighting investment recommendations, as well as trading services. Their research is provided by Alexander Green, Chief Investment Strategist at the Oxford Club, as well as Chief Income Strategist Marc Lichtenfeld and Research Director Kristin Orman.

== History & Background ==
In the mid-1980s, Bill Bonner, the Founder of The Agora, took over The Passport Club – an international businessman's club founded in the early 1970s. In 1989, Bonner hired recent Thunderbird MBA graduate Julia Guth as Membership Director. Her job was to expand the club's services and local chapter participation.

Around the same time, an investment and business publisher in Florida launched a financial newsletter called The Oxford Club, which grew to 10,000 readers worldwide. In 1991, the publishing company sold its interest to Bonner, who welcomed these new Members into his own club and changed the name from The Passport Club to The Oxford Club. Mark Nestmann, an international wealth-protection and privacy expert, became Financial Editor of the monthly Oxford Club investment newsletter, The Oxford Communiqué. In these early days of the club, all communications were delivered by mail only.

In 1998, The Board of Governors and executive committee established The Chairman's Circle, the highest level of distinction and benefits for the club's most involved and committed Members. The same year, The Oxford Club holds its first annual Investment University Conference.

In 2003, CEO & Executive Publisher, Julia Guth sets up a nonprofit to begin charitable works around our Rancho Santana community in Nicaragua.

In 2007, Alexander Green took over as the club's Investment Director. Marc Lichtenfeld joins The Oxford Club as an expert on healthcare, biotech and income investing.

In 2020, The Oxford Club's publication of its products expanded to Japan, creating a new Oxford Club Japan website with three services translated into Japanese.

In 2022, The Oxford Club launched its first-ever chat room-based trading service for Chairman's Circle Members, open from 9:30am–10:30am ET Monday through Friday.

In 2023, Todd Skousen became the new CEO & Executive Publisher. As part of his mission to create a stronger sense of community, Oxford Clubroom, an exclusive online platform where Members can gather to hear from strategists and special guests live, was launched.

== Awards and recognition ==
The Oxford Group, of which The Oxford Club is the flagship member, has been recognized as one of the Baltimore Metro Area Top Workplaces in 2018, 2019, 2020, and 2021 by the Baltimore Sun. The award recognizes the entire Oxford Group, which includes the Oxford Club and other publications.
