= Belvedere Hotel =

Historic hotel in Baltimore, Maryland, USA

- The Belvedere
- U.S. National Register of Historic Places
- Baltimore City Landmark
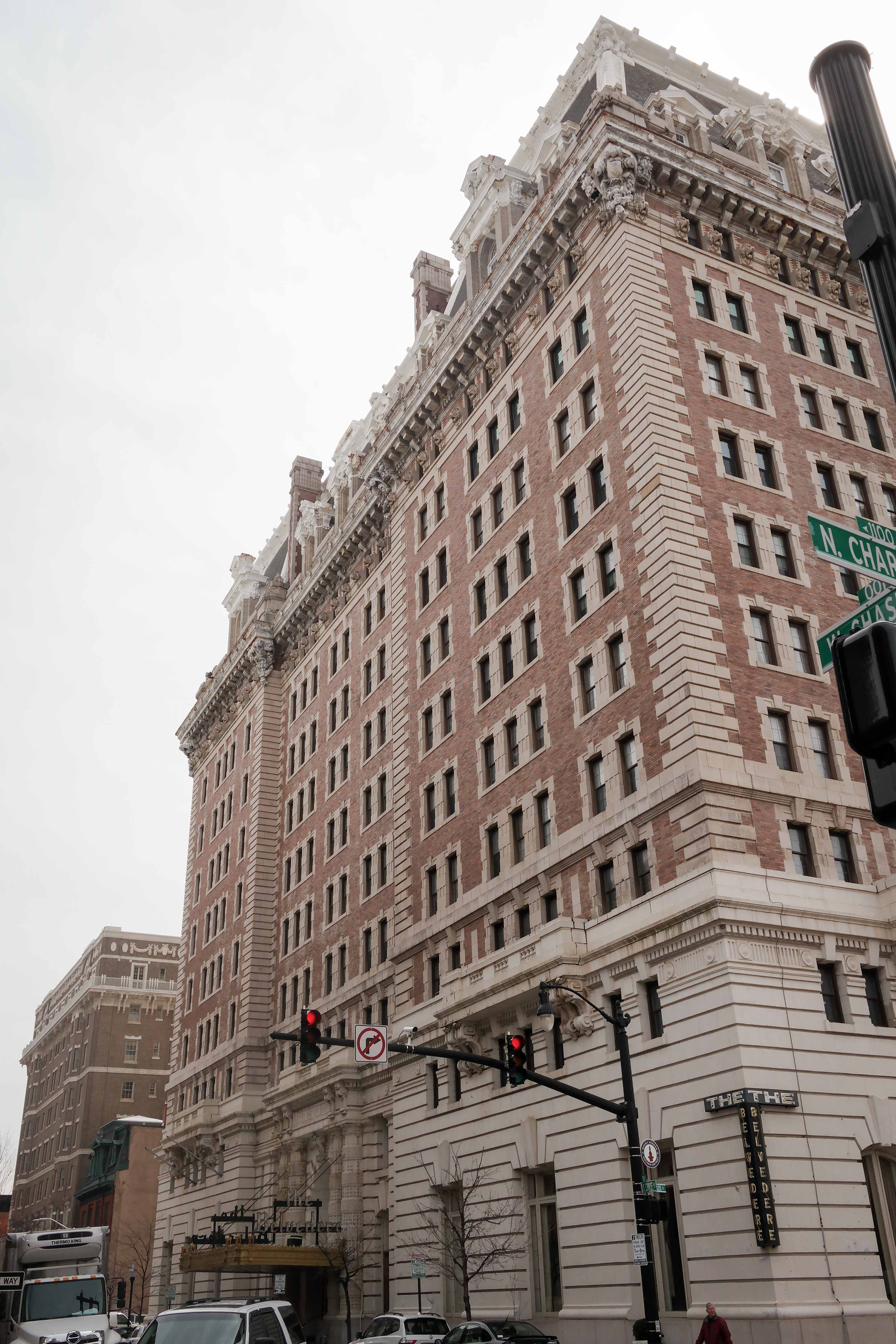
- Belvedere Condominiums, July 2015, (former Hotel Belvedere)

- Location within Baltimore Location within Maryland Location within the United States
- Location: 1 East Chase Street, (off North Charles Street), Baltimore, Maryland
- Coordinates: 39°18′8″N 76°36′58″W
- Area: 0.1 acres (0.040 ha)
- Built: 1902–1903
- Architect: Parker & Thomas; W.A. & E.A. Wells
- Architectural style: Beaux Arts
- NRHP reference No.: 77001529

Significant dates
- Added to NRHP: August 29, 1977
- Designated BCL: October 14, 1975

The Belvedere is a Beaux Arts style building in Baltimore, Maryland. Designed by the Boston architectural firm of Parker and Thomas and built in 1902–1903, the Belvedere is a Baltimore City Landmark at the southeast corner of North Charles Street, facing north on East Chase Street in the city's fashionable Mount Vernon-Belvedere-Mount Royal neighborhood. In 1991 it was converted into condominiums, though areas remain open to the public.

== Design ==
The eleven-story tan brick building rises 188 feet (57 m) from a rusticated stone base to an elaborately detailed "French Second Empire" styled crown with a traditional mansard roofline.

== Origin ==
The hotel is named for its site on the former "Belvidere" estate of American Revolutionary War military leader/hero, later a civic and city leader, Colonel John Eager Howard, (1752–1827), of the famous "Maryland Line" regiment of the Continental Army which distinguished itself especially at the Battle of Long Island/Battle of Brooklyn outside New York in August 1776 and the Battle of Cowpens in South Carolina in 1780. Howard's lands north and west of old Baltimore Town, known as "Howard's Woods" were eventually used to donate plots for several churches and civic sites including the landmark Washington Monument and the four park-like squares surrounding it, when constructed 1815–1827, along with the old Baltimore Cathedral (now the Basilica of the National Shrine of the Assumption of the Blessed Virgin Mary), built 1806–1821, by the famed British-American architect, Benjamin Henry Latrobe, (1764–1820), a few blocks southwest on Cathedral Street. Later Howard children and members of the family sub-divided the grand estate beginning in the late 1820s into the 1830s and 1840s for rows of elegant townhouses (and later cultural institutions) extending northward from the harbor-front city, eventually surrounding the old historic mansion situated at the intersection of North Calvert and East Chase Streets until it too was finally razed in the mid 1870s.

== Hotel history ==
The H.B. partners retained the architectural firm of Parker and Thomas of Baltimore and Boston, and the construction firm of W. W. and E. A. Wells of Chicago. Parker and Thomas had also been in the process of designing the new Homewood campus in the northern section of the city along North Charles Street above 30th Street of red brick and white wood-trimmed Georgian architecture/Federal-styled architecture at The Johns Hopkins University when it relocated from its original previous downtown site along North Howard and West Centre, Little Ross and West Monument Streets around the same time and continuing for a few decades later.

When it was completed, the Belvedere, according to early accounts was considered "something of a sensation for Baltimore." Over the years, it has figured prominently in Baltimore's social, political and economic life, especially as it was located in a tiny predominately exclusive residential neighborhood, north of where most of the other downtown hotels were then clustered. In 1912 Woodrow Wilson stayed at the Belvedere Hotel while attending the 1912 Democratic National Convention at the nearby Fifth Regiment Armory.

The Hotel Belvedere was known as the premier lodging in Baltimore during the first half of the twentieth century, hosting American Presidents Theodore Roosevelt, John F. Kennedy and Woodrow Wilson, among others, along with such celebrities as Wallis Warfield Simpson (the Duchess of Windsor), (controversial wife, born and raised in Baltimore, of abdicated King Edward VIII of Great Britain in 1936–1937), General of the Army Douglas MacArthur, actor Clark Gable, and many dozens of others.

Sheraton Hotels, a nationwide syndicate/chain purchased the hotel in June 1946 and operated it as the "Sheraton-Belvedere Hotel". Sheraton sold the hotel, along with seventeen other aging properties, to Gotham Hotels in 1968 and it regained its original name.

As "Belvedere Hotel", the building was designated a Baltimore City Landmark on October 14, 1975.

The 2006 death of Rey Rivera was featured on Unsolved Mysteries. On May 24, 2006, the body of Rivera was found inside a conference room of the hotel's galleria annex south of the main building. The Baltimore Police Department ruled Rivera's death a probable suicide due to the hole created from a jump impact, even though the case had numerous inconsistencies.

=== Conversion ===
Former owner Victor Frenkil received numerous city loans before selling the hotel in bankruptcy court for 5.5 million in 1990.

The Belvedere was converted to condominiums in 1991, although the building's historic, distinctive grand interior spaces of the ballrooms, restaurants (such as the "John Eager Howard Room" with its large grand murals of pastoral Baltimore scenery, and the "Owl Bar"), and lounges (including the modernistic night club/bistro, "The 13th Floor" and observation level, along with a basement-level shopping arcade) were cleaned, restored and enhanced, remaining open to the general passing public.

== In popular media ==
- In Homicide: Life on the Street season 4 episode 20 The Wedding: The Belvedere serves as the venue for the wedding and reception for Det. Meldrick Lewis.
- In Homicide: Life on the Street season 5 episode 18 Double Blind, a chef working at the Belvedere Hotel gets murdered.
- In Homicide: Life on the Street season 6 episode 1 Blood Ties: Part 1, a woman is found beaten to death in a men’s bathroom at the Belvedere Hotel, where a prominent businessman and philanthropist is being honored.
- In Mad Men season 3 episode 1 Don Draper and Salvatore Romano go on a business trip to Baltimore and stay at the Belvedere Hotel.
- In Archer season 4 episode 6 a young Archer stays at the Belvedere Hotel while he’s considering a Johns Hopkins lacrosse scholarship.
