= Whitney Tilson =

American investor and political activist

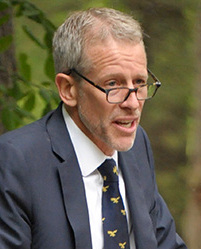
- Born: Whitney Richard Tilson; November 1, 1966 (age 59); New Haven, Connecticut, U.S.
- Education: Harvard University (BA, MBA)
- Political party: Democratic
- Spouse: Susan Blackman
- Children: 3
- Relatives: John Q. Tilson (great- grandfather)
- Website: Campaign website

Whitney Richard Tilson (born November 1, 1966) is an American former hedge fund manager, author, and Democratic Party political activist. He was a candidate in the 2025 New York City mayoral Democratic primary.

== Early life and education ==
Whitney Tilson was born in New Haven, Connecticut, to Thomas and Susan Tilson. His great-grandfather was John Q. Tilson, a Republican politician from Connecticut who served in the House of Representatives for 22 years, including six years as House Majority Leader during the Coolidge and Hoover administrations.

Tilson's parents met when they were in the Peace Corps, teaching in the Philippines, and married three months later; as of 2015 they lived in Kenya, as did his sister. Tilson grew up for a few years in Tanzania and Nicaragua, where his parents served as educators in the Peace Corps. At age six, he participated in the Stanford marshmallow experiment, a psychological study that examined delayed gratification among children.

Tilson graduated from Northfield Mount Hermon School in Massachusetts in 1985. In 1989, he graduated magna cum laude from Harvard College with a bachelor's degree in government. In 1994, he earned an MBA with high distinction from Harvard Business School. He was named a Baker Scholar, a recognition awarded to the top 5% of the graduating class.

== Career ==
=== Finance ===
Tilson spent two years working as a consultant for the Boston Consulting Group (BCG) before business school. BCG agreed to defer his start date for six months so that he could help launch Teach for America.

Tilson then managed a hedge fund for 18 years. He followed the approach of investor Warren Buffett, investing in companies selling at a significant discount to intrinsic value, and also described himself as a disciple of value investing theorist Benjamin Graham. He founded and managed the hedge fund Kase Capital from 1999 to 2017, which in turn managed three value-oriented hedge funds and two mutual funds, as a value investor. As of February 2004, his hedge fund had returned 68% (53% after fees) since its start on January 1, 1999, compared with a 3% loss for the Standard & Poor's 500-stock index. The fund's assets peaked at over $200 million, and it closed in September 2017 after underperforming the S&P for a number of years.

In 2019, Tilson became an editor at Stansberry Research, an investment newsletter that has more than 100,000 paid subscribers. As of January 2025, he was the lead analyst for the Stansberry Investment Advisory newsletter.

=== Writing ===
Tilson has authored or co-authored three books, More Mortgage Meltdown: 6 Ways to Profit in These Bad Times (2009) with Glenn Tongue, The Art of Value Investing: How the World's Best Investors Beat the Market (2013) with John Heins, and The Art of Playing Defense: How to Get Ahead by Not Falling Behind (2021). He was also a contributing editor to Poor Charlie's Almanack: The Essential Wit and Wisdom of Charles T. Munger (2023).

He is a frequent contributor to financial publications, including the Stansberry Investment Advisory newsletter, the Financial Times, Kiplinger's Personal Finance, The Motley Fool, Forbes, TheStreet, and CNBC.

=== Media ===
Tilson has been featured in two 60 Minutes segments. The first, in December 2008, was about the 2008 housing crisis, and won an Emmy.

In 2015, he was featured in a second 60 Minutes segment, which was about the company Lumber Liquidators. The broadcast accused the company of selling an unsafe type of Chinese-made laminate flooring that contained dangerous levels of the carcinogen formaldehyde which exceeded emissions standards. Tilson had shorted the company's stock after it more than doubled in a year, and paid $5,000 to test three pieces of wood; he said that formaldehyde levels in the wood he tested were two to six times the California Air Resources Board limits. Shares of the company dropped 25% the day after the broadcast; eight months later it was down 75%. The company ultimately paid a $33 million penalty.

== Activism ==
=== Antisemitism ===
Tilson was critical of Harvard's response to antisemitism on campus in the wake of the Gaza war and October 7 attacks. In November 2023, he was so angry at the school for failing to stand up to antisemitism that he declined an invitation to meet with a Harvard Business School fund-raising officer. He opined: "The damage that Harvard has done to its brand since Oct. 7 is only rivaled in history by New Coke and what Elon Musk has done to Twitter." He said that he considered Harvard "the least needy charity on earth".

=== Education reform ===
Tilson was a founding member of Teach For America, a nonprofit that places college graduates as teachers in severely underprivileged schools. While attending Harvard Business School, he worked with Professor Michael Porter to create and became the director of the Initiative for a Competitive Inner City, which has provided $1.7 billion in capital to minority-owned businesses across the country.

Tilson is involved with a number of charities that focus on education reform. He served on the board of the Knowledge is Power Program (KIPP) Academy, a charter school in the South Bronx, for two decades, and is a vocal supporter of charter schools. He is a co-founder and board member of national political action committee Democrats for Education Reform.

In 2007, Tilson helped create a $1 million program (called Reach, for Rewarding Achievement) funded by philanthropists to pay students in 25 public schools and six Roman Catholic private schools in New York City who do well on Advanced Placement exams. High school students receiving a top score of five on one of the exams earned $1,000 (a four was worth $750, and a three was worth $500). The schools chosen for the program all had a high proportion of low-income black or Latino students. Tilson approached the Pershing Square Foundation to finance the project, and it agreed to give the project $1 million for its first year.

=== Politics ===
Tilson served on the finance committees of Barack Obama and Cory Booker. He has donated to dozens of Democratic candidates. In 2016, he was derisively criticized by Democratic Senator Elizabeth Warren in a Facebook post as a "hedge fund billionaire... thrilled by Donald Trump's economic team of Wall Street insiders". The New York Times pointed out, however, that there was "one glaring problem with Ms. Warren's attack". Tilson happened to be "one of the few financial executives who publicly fought Mr. Trump's election and supported Hillary Clinton... Mr. Tilson also happened to be one of the rare Wall Street executives who had donated to Ms. Warren... Recently, he gave Mrs. Clinton $1,000 so he could see Ms. Warren speak at a campaign fund-raiser." Pulitzer Prize-winning columnist Nicholas Kristof described Warren's post as an "unbalanced screed". Warren later apologized.

After President Joe Biden's poor performance in his June 2024 presidential debate against Donald Trump, Tilson pushed for Biden to step aside from the Democratic ticket. Despite having been a long-time financial supporter of Biden, he said: "If the man I saw at the debate is the real Joe Biden right now, it would be a waste of my time and money to support him because he has almost no chance of beating Trump."

==== 2025 New York City mayoral campaign ====
In November 2024, Tilson announced his entry into the June 2025 Democratic primary for Mayor of New York City in the 2025 mayoral election. He promised to cut New York City violent crime, reduce municipal spending, address the high cost of living, and improve New York City public schools. He called "defund the police" the "three dumbest words of all time".

After the federal Justice Department directed the Manhattan U.S. Attorney to drop the federal bribery and corruption case against NYC Mayor Eric Adams, Tilson wrote: “Eric Adams is corrupt and an embarrassment to New York City. He should be sleeping in a jail cell, not hiding in a taxpayer-funded mansion on the Upper East Side. He sold out New York to kiss Trump's ass so he could avoid the consequences of his actions.”

=== Taxation ===
Tilson is a member of the Patriotic Millionaires, a nonpartisan organization of high net worth Americans who are in favor of the restructuring of the American tax system so that wealthy people pay a greater share of their income in taxes. He wrote in a Washington Post op-ed in 2012: "people like me — who aren’t suffering at all in these tough economic times, who are in many cases doing the best we’ve ever done and who can easily afford to pay more in taxes with no impact on our lifestyle — should be the first to step up and make a small sacrifice."

=== Other ===
Tilson has served on the board of the Fistula Foundation. It focuses on the treatment of obstetric fistula, funding repair surgeries for the medical condition.

In September 2011, Tilson raised $200,000 for charities working to address the famine, violence, and mass rape in Somalia during the Somali Civil War. He matched up to $100 of each contribution. In 2020, during the COVID-19 pandemic in New York City, Tilson volunteered his time and $7,000 to help build a 68-bed field hospital in Central Park, to treat overflow coronavirus patients from Mount Sinai Hospital. He set up tents and beds, donated shovels and sleds, led volunteering efforts, and bought and delivered food for the group's doctors and nurses. The field hospital was an initiative of Samaritan's Purse, an evangelical Christian humanitarian aid organization led by Rev. Franklin Graham. Tilson supported their effort despite being strongly opposed to the group's views and Graham's statements decrying both gay marriage and legal abortion, finding their positions "abhorrent", and he said he did not intend his volunteer work and donation to be taken as an endorsement of the group or of Graham. In his view, helping the Covid response was more important than protesting the group's ideologies. He said: "I'll have the ideological discussions with them later. If they're here saving my fellow New Yorkers' lives, and not even asking to be paid for it, then I will absolutely help them do that."

Tilson has visited Ukraine five times since Russia's 2022 invasion of Ukraine. He has raised more than $18 million for humanitarian supplies, medical care, ambulances, generators, and battery packs,

== Personal life ==
Tilson lives in Manhattan with his wife Susan, née Blackman, whom he married in 1993 and with whom he has three adult daughters. He is a longtime congregant of the Central Synagogue in Manhattan; he is not Jewish, though his wife and daughters are. He competes in obstacle course racing, participating in seven 24-hour World's Toughest Mudder races. He has won the over-50 age category twice, and was the first to set the age group mark of 75 miles in 2016. He is an avid rock climber and mountaineer. Tilson has summited El Capitan, climbed Mt. Kilimanjaro, Mt. Blanc, the Matterhorn, and the Eiger.
