= Tilson's Manual =

1948 parliamentary authority text

Tilson's Manual

Tilson's Manual, or A Manual of Parliamentary Procedure, is a parliamentary authority written by John Q. Tilson and published in 1948.

== Seconding motions ==
Chapter VI of Tilson's Manual is on Seconding Motions. Tilson explores the history of seconding motions in the English Parliament and in early American Legislatives. He then details the reasons why the practice of seconding motions should be dropped.

Cited in Mason's Legislative Manual.
