= Addison Wiggin =

American writer

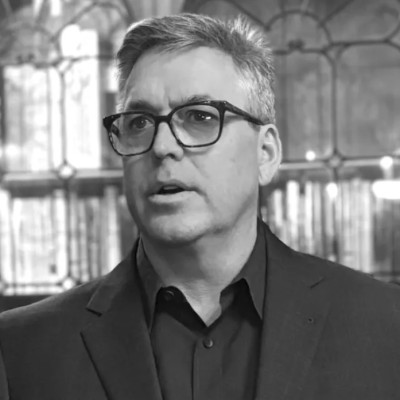
- Wiggin in 2024
- Education: St. John's College
- Occupations: Financial writer, publisher
- Writing career
- Language: English
- Notable works: The Demise of the Dollar, I.O.U.S.A.
- Website: thewigginsessions.com

Addison Wiggin is an American writer, publisher, and filmmaker. He is the host of the YouTube show The Wiggin Sessions, covering financial markets, the economy and politics. He writes the financial daily The Daily Missive. Addison is also the host and editor of The Essential Investor, a resource for individuals who manage their own money.

== Financial writing and analysis ==
Wiggin has said that private investment, not government funding, is the crucial factor in advancing economic recovery.

In a 2005 article for The New York Times Magazine, Stephen Metcalf described Wiggin as bullish on gold and critical of the Federal Reserve and American indebtedness:

The narrative Wiggin spun out for me over lunch is repeated, nearly verbatim, by almost everyone in the gold community. "This is the blow-off phase for the Great Dollar Era. We're in an unsustainable trend right now," Wiggin told me, ticking off the miscalculations that have brought us to the brink of an economic apocalypse. To begin with, the U.S. has become the world's biggest debtor, with three outstanding obligations at alarming highs: consumer debt, or our mortgages and credit cards; the federal deficit; and our current account deficit with foreign countries. Federal Reserve Chairman Alan Greenspan, Wiggin continued, has simply shifted one bubble – the 90's bubble in stocks and bonds – into another, in real estate and "overconsumption," or the American propensity to pay for an ever-more-lavish lifestyle on credit.

His early work concerned the fraud that came with the dot Com Bubble of the early 2000s. Later, he was identified as one of the people who forecasted the Financial Panic of 2008 when Time magazine named him part of "The Armageddon Gang".

Economists, business executives and government officials make worried pronouncements about this very predicament from time to time. But they usually stop short of apocalypse. "There are a lot of people who get the analysis of the situation correct, but then they say the U.S. economy is very resilient and if we just fix a few structural flaws we'll be fine," explains Empire of Debt co-author Wiggin. "My view is that generally it takes a crisis to get people to act." If you agree with Wiggin, then former Federal Reserve Chairman Alan Greenspan's legendary ability to pilot us past market jitters and avert major economic dislocations is something not to be praised but to be condemned.

In a June 2011 interview with America's Radio News, Wiggin expressed concern about a series of asset bubbles and related trends in government spending.

...The financial markets in 2001 and 2002 got crushed because of the dot-com bubble, and then we saw that again in 2006 and 2007. Expected revenues from rising house prices never materialized, because the housing market fell apart. The country is addicted to these asset bubbles. And politicians, while making their budgets—it happens at all levels, at state, local, federal and with all the agencies—they kind of plan the spending based on anticipated revenues from these rising asset bubbles. But when the asset bubbles fall apart, when the housing bubble crashes, and when the stock market goes down, those revenues never materialize, but the spending continues.

== Publishing work ==
Wiggin served as executive publisher for Agora Publishing for 18 years. During his tenure he founded Agora Financial and Paradigm Press.

== Documentary film ==
Another Agora Inc. subsidiary, Agora Entertainment, was created to finance the production of I.O.U.S.A., a feature-length documentary film directed by Patrick Creadon. Wiggin served as executive producer of the film and co-authored a companion book of the same title with Kate Incontrera. The documentary was entered in the Sundance Film Festival in 2008. Film critic Roger Ebert named I.O.U.S.A. one of the top five documentary films of 2008.

== Books ==
- Financial Reckoning Day: Surviving the Soft Depression of the 21st Century (with Bill Bonner). John Wiley & Sons. 2003. ISBN 0-471-44973-3.
- The Demise of the Dollar: And Why it is Great for Your Investments. John Wiley & Sons. 2005. ISBN 0-471-74601-0.
- Empire of Debt: Rise of an Epic Financial Crisis (with Bill Bonner). John Wiley & Sons. 2006. ISBN 0-471-73902-2.
- I.O.U.S.A.: One Nation. Under Stress. In Debt. (with Kate Incontrera). John Wiley & Sons. 2008. ISBN 0-470-22277-8. Companion book to the I.O.U.S.A. film.
- The New Empire of Debt: The Rise and Fall of an Epic Financial Bubble (with Bill Bonner). John Wiley & Sons. 2009. ISBN 0-470-48326-1.
- Financial Reckoning Day Fallout: Surviving Today's Global Depression 2nd Edition (with Bill Bonner). John Wiley & Sons. 2009. ISBN 1-400-11369-5
- The Little Book of the Shrinking Dollar: What You Can Do to Protect Your Money Now. John Wiley & Sons. 2012. ISBN 1-118-24525-3.
- The Demise of the Dollar: From the Bailouts to the Pandemic and Beyond (3rd Edition). John Wiley & Sons. 2023. ISBN 1-394-17465-9.
- Financial Reckoning Day: Memes, Manias, Booms & Busts ... Investing In the 21st Century (Agora Series) 3rd Edition (with Bill Bonner). John Wiley & Sons. Releasing October 10, 2023. ISBN 1-394-17466-7
