= Laissez Faire Books =

American libertarian bookseller

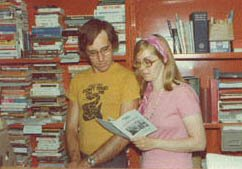
John Muller and Sharon Presley, Founders of Laissez Faire Books, in 1972.

Laissez Faire Books (LFB) was a libertarian bookseller and publisher founded in 1972 by John Muller and Sharon Presley, and originally based in New York City. From 1982 to 2007, Laissez Faire Books operated as a division of the non-profit corporations Center for Independent Thought and Center for Libertarian Thought, both led by Andrea Millen Rich. Classic and contemporary works of libertarianism were published under the imprint Fox & Wilkes Books.

From 1982 to 2005, LFB was headed by Andrea Millen Rich, who with her husband Howard Rich also developed its mail-order business. In Radicals for Capitalism, a history book about the libertarian movement, Brian Doherty wrote that the store became an important social center for the movement.

The bookstore's ownership passed to the International Society for Individual Liberty (ISIL) in November 2007, and archival records prior to ISIL's ownership were preserved by the Hoover Institution at Stanford University. In March 2011, Agora Financial acquired Laissez Faire Books but began using the brand for other purposes.

Laissez Faire Books' archival records ("correspondence, memoranda, financial records, catalogs, other printed matter, and photographs, relating to libertarianism and publishing in the United States") for the period 1959–2008 are stored at the Hoover Institution Library at Stanford University.
