= The Week =

British-American weekly news magazines

- Cover for 6 April 2024 issue (UK)
- Editors-in-chief: Caroline Law (UK edition); Theunis Bates (US edition)
- Categories: News magazine
- Frequency: Weekly
- Total circulation: 153,925 (UK); 416,358 (US); (2021)
- First issue: 1995 (UK edition); April 2001 (US edition); October 2008 (Australian edition)
- Final issue: October 2012 (Australian edition)
- Company: Future plc
- Country: United Kingdom; United States; Australia (formerly)
- Based in: New York City (US edition); London (UK edition)
- Language: English (all editions)
- Website: theweek.com/uk (UK edition); theweek.com (US edition)
- ISSN: 1533-8304

The Week is a weekly news magazine with editions in the United Kingdom and United States. The British publication was founded in 1995 and the American edition in 2001. An Australian edition was published from 2008 to 2012. A children's edition, The Week Junior, has been published in the UK since 2015, and the US since 2020.

== History ==
The Week was founded in the United Kingdom by Jolyon Connell (formerly of the Sunday Telegraph) in 1995. In April 2001, the magazine began publishing an American edition; and an Australian edition followed in October 2008. Dennis Publishing, founded by Felix Dennis, publishes the UK edition and, until 2012, published the Australian edition. The Week Publications publishes the U.S. edition. In 2021, The Week celebrated the twentieth anniversary of its first publication in the United States.

Since November 2015 The Week has published a children's edition, The Week Junior, a current affairs magazine aimed at 8 to 14-year-olds.

The Australian edition of The Week ceased operation in October 2012. The final edition, its 199th, was released on 12 October 2012. At the end, it was selling 28,000 copies a week, with a readership of 83,000.

Future Plc acquired Dennis Publishing and several of its titles including The Week in 2021.

== Content ==
The magazine's content largely consists of summaries of news stories and opinion columns published by other media outlets earlier in the week. Some summaries are based on articles in foreign media that were originally published in a language other than English.

== Web publications ==
In September 2007, the magazine's U.S. edition launched a daily website. A UK site followed soon after. Both websites reflect the approach of the magazines, publishing non-partisan articles that encompass a wide range of perspectives. The Week launched a podcast, The Week Unwrapped in 2017, which was named news podcast of the year at the Publisher Podcast Awards in 2020 and 2021.
