= John Q. Tilson =

American politician (1866–1958)

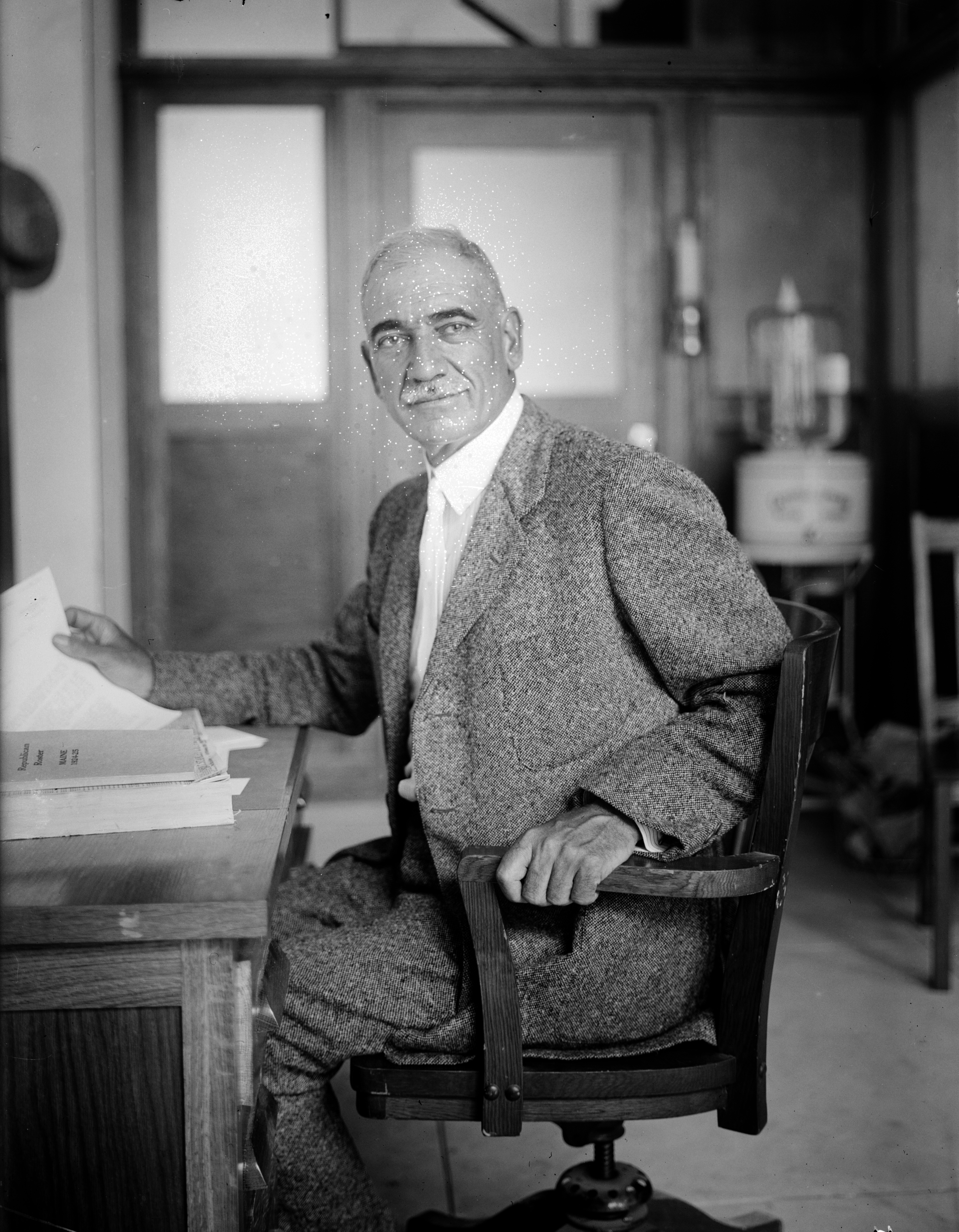

House Majority Leader
- In office March 4, 1925 – March 3, 1931
- Preceded by: Nicholas Longworth
- Succeeded by: Henry Thomas Rainey

Member of the U.S. House of Representatives from Connecticut's 3rd district
- In office March 4, 1915 – December 3, 1932
- Preceded by: Thomas L. Reilly
- Succeeded by: Francis T. Maloney

Member of the U.S. House of Representatives from Connecticut's at-large district
- In office March 4, 1909 – March 3, 1913
- Preceded by: George L. Lilley
- Succeeded by: District eliminated

Member of the Connecticut House of Representatives
- In office 1904-1908

Personal details
- Born: John Quillin Tilson; April 5, 1866 Clearbranch, Tennessee, U.S.
- Died: August 14, 1958 (aged 92) New London, New Hampshire, U.S.
- Party: Republican
- Relatives: Whitney Tilson (great-grandson)

John Quillin Tilson (April 5, 1866 – August 14, 1958) was an American politician. In 1898, he served as a major in the United States Volunteer Infantry in the Spanish–American War. A Republican, he represented Connecticut in the United States House of Representatives for almost 22 years, and was House Majority leader for six years.

== Early life ==
Tilson was born in Clearbranch, Unicoi County, Tennessee, on April 5, 1866, to William and Katherine (Sams) Tilson. His father had obtained a grant of 900 acres in the Clearbranch community. He spent his early life on the family farm.

He attended both public and private schools in nearby Flag Pond, and later at Mars Hill, North Carolina. He went to college at Carson–Newman College, in Jefferson City, Tennessee, where he graduated in 1891. Later he enrolled at Yale Law School, where he graduated in 1893. He was admitted to the bar in 1897, and started to practice law in New Haven, Connecticut.

In 1898, when the Spanish–American War broke out, he enlisted and served as a major in the Sixth Regiment, United States Volunteer Infantry.

== Career ==
In 1904, Tilson was elected to the Connecticut House of Representatives, where he served until 1908, the last two years as speaker.

He was later elected to United States House of Representatives, serving from 1909 to 1913; he ran unsuccessfully for reelection in 1912. Tilson ran for election again and was again reelected to the House of Representatives. He served from March 4, 1915, until his resignation on December 3, 1932. He was the Majority Leader for the 69th Congress, 70th Congress, and the 71st Congress. He became a delegate to the Republican National Convention in 1932.

Speaking of the 1917 Balfour Declaration, he said: "I am in thorough accord with the official accord of Secretary Balfour, as endorsed by the countries of France and Italy, on the subject of the establishment in Palestine of a national home for the Jewish people, and I shall gladly support a movement in that direction.... To whose care should it be more appropriately entrusted than the descendants of those who made such wonderful history there? Jewish history subsequent to the dispersion from Palestine makes it all the more certain that if restored to those who made its forebears earlier history glorious, it will be faithfully kept and sacredly guarded for the benefit of all mankind."

== Later life ==
After his retirement from public life, Tilson returned to the practice of law in Washington D.C., and then in New Haven, Connecticut. He also served as a special lecturer at Yale University on parliamentary law and procedure, and wrote Tilson's Manual.

American hedge fund manager and philanthropist Whitney Tilson is his great-grandson.

== Death ==
Tilson died in New London, New Hampshire, on August 14, 1958. He is interred at the private burial grounds on the family farm in Clearbranch, Tennessee.

U.S. House of Representatives
Preceded by George L. Lilley	Member of the U.S. House of Representatives from Connecticut's at-large congressional district March 4, 1909 – March 3, 1913	Succeeded by None, At-large seat eliminated
Preceded by Thomas L. Reilly	Member of the U.S. House of Representatives from Connecticut's 3rd congressional district March 4, 1915 – December 3, 1932	Succeeded by Francis T. Maloney
Party political offices
Preceded by Nicholas Longworth	Majority Leader of the United States House of Representatives; 1925–1931	Succeeded by Henry T. Rainey
