= Stansberry Research =

Investment research firm and publisher

- Type: Private
- Industry: Publishing
- Founded: 1999; 27 years ago (as Stansberry & Associates Investment Research)
- Founder: Porter Stansberry
- Headquarters: Baltimore, Maryland, United States
- Key people: Brett Aitken (publisher); Whitney Tilson (editor, Whitney Tilson's Daily, Stansberry's Investment Advisory)
- Website: stansberryresearch.com

Stansberry Research is a privately owned American publishing company that focuses on investment related publications. Its publisher is Brett Aitken. The company is headquartered in Baltimore, Maryland, with additional offices in Florida, Oregon, and California.

The company specializes in investment research with an information services product line consisting primarily of monthly and bi-monthly advisory newsletters written by a variety of financial editors. Topics include natural resource, power, oil, and mining company investments, as well as health care and biotechnology. Value investing, corporate bond, and alternative investing are also featured. The company says its newsletter has subscribers in over 100 countries.

== History ==
Stansberry Research (previously Stansberry & Associates Investment Research) was founded in 1999 by Frank Porter Stansberry as an independent investment research firm. Its publisher is Brett Aitken.

In 2014, Snopes.com investigated the firm's claim that United States currency will "collapse", and found the claim to be false.

== Analysts ==
Steve Sjuggerud is the founder and editor of the Stansberry Research publication True Wealth, launched in 2001.

Former hedge fund manager Whitney Tilson joined in 2019 and is the lead analyst and editor of flagship newsletter Stansberry Investment Advisory. David Eifrig is the editor of Retirement Millionaire and is a regular contributor to the Stansberry Research publication Daily Wealth.

Matt Badiali is the editor of S&A Resource Report, which focuses on natural resources, metals, energy, and investments. He joined Stansberry Research in 2005 and has a BS in Earth Sciences from Penn State University and a master's in Geology from Florida Atlantic University.

Dan Ferris has been the editor of Extreme Value, a newsletter that concentrates on safe stocks, good businesses, and steep discounts, since 2002. Stansberry Research published Ferris' book World Dominating Dividend Growers: Income Streams that Never Go Down in 2014.

== 2007 fraud conviction ==
In 2003, the Securities and Exchange Commission accused Stansberry of fraud committed while he edited various newsletters published under the umbrella of Agora, Inc. and Agora subsidiary, Pirate Investors LLC. In 2007, the United States District Court for the District of Maryland found Stansberry guilty.
