= Porter Stansberry =

American writer

- Born: Frank Porter Stansberry; December 18, 1972 (age 53)
- Education: University of Florida
- Occupations: Financial publisher, Founder Stansberry Research
- Height: 1.81 m (5 ft 11 1/2 in)
- Website: Porter Stansberry

Frank Porter Stansberry is an American financial publisher and author. Stansberry founded Stansberry Research (previously Stansberry & Associates Investment Research), a private publishing company based in Baltimore, Maryland, in 1999. He was the author of the monthly newsletter Stansberry's Investment Advisory, which covers investments and investment theory in commodities, real estate, and the stock market. Stansberry was also the creator of the 2011 online video The End of America, in which he predicted the imminent collapse of the United States. In 2002, the SEC brought a case for securities fraud, and a federal judge fined him $1.5 million in 2007.

== Career ==
In 1999, Stansberry founded Stansberry Research, a private publishing company based in Baltimore, Maryland.

=== SEC case ===
In 2002, Stansberry sent out an email offering to sell for $1,000 the name of a company purportedly about to obtain a contract to dismantle nuclear weapons for Russia. The Securities and Exchange Commission sued him in 2003 on this basis and for his newsletters containing "nothing more than baseless speculation and outright lies", accusing him of a "scheme to defraud public investors by disseminating false information in several Internet newsletters." The case went to trial in 2005, and a federal court found that Stansberry had sent out a newsletter to subscribers predicting one company's stock, USEC Inc., would increase by over 100%. Stansberry maintains his information came from a company executive; the court ruled he fabricated the source. The verdict was upheld on appeal. The court rejected Stansberry's First Amendment defense, saying "Stansberry's conduct undoubtedly involved deliberate fraud, making statements that he knew to be false." In 2007, U.S. District Court Judge Marvin J. Garbis ordered Stansberry and his investment firm, then called "Pirate Investor", to pay $1.5 million in restitution and civil penalties for defrauding "public investors by disseminating false information in several Internet newsletters."

At the time of the trial, many media outlets spoke out due to their views that the case was relevant to First Amendment rights. A group of newspaper publishers urged the Supreme Court to reverse the decision by the United States Court of Appeals for the Fourth Circuit that Stansberry was liable, and signed an amici curiae in defense of Stansberry. They claimed that a guilty verdict was "a significant threat to the free dissemination of news about the financial markets and specific investment opportunities" and could lead to a situation that "would be contrary to the spirit of our system of a free and independent press." When the Supreme Court refused to hear the case, a New York Times editorial column noted that "the implications of the S.E.C.'s action are potentially profound: newspapers or Web sites promising their paying readers stock information that later turns out to be untrue suddenly leave themselves open to fraud charges. Any financial commentator who passes on bad information in good faith could be sued."

=== Continued career ===
Stansberry was also previously the editor of the internet financial newsletters Porter Stansberry's Investment Advisory and Porter Stansberry's Put Strategy Report.

He became the first American editor of the Fleet Street Letter, Britain's longest-running financial newsletter.

== Rivera case ==
On May 16, 2006, Stansberry's childhood friend and coworker Rey Rivera went missing and was later found dead inside the Belvedere Hotel. The case was portrayed in the Netflix reboot of the television series Unsolved Mysteries. Porter declined requests to be interviewed for Unsolved Mysteries.

At the time of Rey's death he was working for Porter at Stansberry and Associates. Immediately after his death it has been reported that Stansberry and Associates put a gag order on the case so that employees at the company could not discuss the case with anyone, which have led to some speculation and theories about whether they were hiding something. At this time the case remains unsolved.

== Claims and predictions ==
Stansberry claims to have made a number of successful financial market predictions. In June 2008, Stansberry claims that he predicted that Fannie Mae and Freddie Mac would go bankrupt in the next 12 months, as well as going on to say that he positioned his clients to profit by shorting stocks, and that he does not know of any other firm that "more accurately forecasted" or warned of the 2008 financial crisis. By September 2008, both mortgage companies were placed into government conservatorship. There is no evidence supporting Stansberry’s claims that he predicted these events before they occurred.

=== The End of America ===
In 2011, Stansberry produced a 77-minute promotional video titled The End of America. Adam Wiederman of The Motley Fool referred to The End of America as a mixture of valid points and hyperbole.
