= Bill Bonner (author) =

American author

- Born: 1948 (age 77–78)
- Education: University of New Mexico
- Known for: Founder of Agora Financial

Bill Bonner is an American author of books and articles on economic and financial subjects. He is the founder of Agora Financial, as well as a co-founder of Bonner & Partners publishing. Bonner has written articles for the news and opinion blog LewRockwell.com, MoneyWeek magazine, and his daily financial column Bill Bonner's Diary.

== Biography ==
Bonner was born in 1948. He attended the University of New Mexico and Georgetown University Law School, and he began work with Jim Davidson, at the National Taxpayers Union.

Bonner was a director of MoneyWeek from 2003 to 2009.

== Works ==
Bonner co-authored Financial Reckoning Day: Surviving The Soft Depression of The 21st Century and Empire of Debt with Addison Wiggin. He also co-authored Mobs, Messiahs and Markets with Lila Rajiva. The latter publication won the GetAbstract International Book Award for 2008. He has previously co-authored two short pamphlets with British media historian, John Campbell, and with The Times former editor, Lord William Rees-Mogg, and has co-edited a book of essays with intellectual historian, Pierre Lemieux.

In his two financial books, as well as in The Daily Reckoning, Bonner has argued that the financial future of the United States is in peril because of various economic and demographic trends, not the least of which is America's large trade deficit. He claims that America's foreign policy exploits are tantamount to the establishment of an empire, and that the cost of maintaining such an empire could accelerate America's eventual decline. Bonner argues in his latest book that mob and mass delusions are part of the human condition

Bonner warned in 2015 that the credit system, which has been the essential basis of the US economy since the 1950s, will inevitably fail, leading to catastrophic failure of the banking system.
