= List of kidnappings (1990–1999) =

The following is a list of kidnappings that occurred in the 1990s, summarizing the events of each case, including instances of celebrity abductions, claimed hoaxes, suspected kidnappings, extradition abductions, and mass kidnappings.

== 1990 ==
Date	Victim(s)	Abductor(s)	Location	Age of victim(s)	Outcome	Notes
5 January 1990	Leann Marion Whitlock	Ronald Lee Henderson and Tommy David Strickler	(United States) Harrisonburg, Virginia, U.S.	19	Murdered	19-year-old Leann Whitlock, a sophomore student of James Madison University, was abducted by two men outside a shopping mall in Harrisonburg, Virginia, before she was murdered inside a wooded area in Augusta County, Virginia. Whitlock's body was found eight days later, and within six months, the two kidnappers, Tommy David Strickler and Ronald Lee Henderson, were arrested and charged with murdering Whitlock. Strickler was sentenced to death and consequently executed on July 21, 1999, while Henderson was sentenced to life imprisonment.
2 April 1990	Humberto Álvarez Machaín	Bounty hunters	Guadalajara, Mexico	Unknown	Released	Alvarez-Machain, a suspect in the murder of Enrique Camarena, was kidnapped, allegedly by Americans to bring him to trial in the United States.
8 May 1990	Becky O'Connell	Donald Eugene Moeller	(United States) Sioux Falls, South Dakota, U.S.	9	Murdered	O'Connell was walking home from a neighborhood convenience store when Moeller kidnapped her. He took her to a wooded area along the banks of the Big Sioux River east of Lake Alvin in Lincoln County, raped her, stabbed her multiple times, and then cut her throat. Moeller was executed for the crime by lethal injection in 2012.
12 May 1990	Mami Matsuda	Unknown	Ashikaga, Tochigi Prefecture, Japan	4	Murdered	4-year-old Mami Matsuda disappeared on 12 May 1990 and was found murdered a day later.
16 or 17 May 1990	Joanna Parrish	Michel Fourniret	Auxerre, France	20	Murdered	To supplement her income during a stay in Auxerre, Parrish, a tutor from England, advertised her services as a teacher in a local newspaper, offering private English lessons. According to a flatmate, she was contacted by a man asking her to teach his son. She arranged to meet the caller outside the Banque Populaire in Auxerre at 7pm on 16 May 1990, but did not return home from the appointment. Her naked body was found the following day in the River Yonne, three miles outside town. She was raped, beaten and strangled. Serial killer Michel Fourniret, long suspected of the murder, eventually confessed to abducting and killing Parrish while serving a life sentence in 2018 but died before he could stand trial; his wife Monique Olivier was later convicted of being an accomplice to the crime.
20 May 1990	Susan Poupart	Unknown	(United States) Lac du Flambeau, Wisconsin, U.S.	29	Murdered	The victim was abducted and murdered. Three people are considered primary suspects, but the murder remains unsolved.
19 June 1990	Elizabeth Bain	Unknown	Scarborough, Ontario, Canada	22	Presumed murdered	Elizabeth Bain was last seen leaving her home to drive to the University of Toronto Scarborough. Her car was found three days later with a large bloodstain on the back seat; she was presumed dead. Her boyfriend, Robert Baltovich, was convicted of her murder but was later exonerated; it is suspected that Bain may have been a victim of serial killer Paul Bernardo.
2 August 1990	British Airways Flight 149 passengers	Iraqi Army	Kuwait International Airport	Various	Various	Plane landed during the invasion of Kuwait.
10 August 1990	Jennifer Schuett	Dennis Earl Bradford	(United States) Dickinson, Texas, U.S.	8	Rescued	Schuett was abducted from her room by Bradford, who told her he was a police officer. He left her in a field after sexually assaulting and attempting to kill her, but she was rescued after being found by a group of children. Bradford was arrested for the crime 19 years later on 13 October 2009, but was found hanged on 10 May 2010 before he went to trial.
30 August 1990	Diana Turbay	Los Priscos	Medellín, Colombia	40	Murdered	Colombian journalist kidnapped by associates of the Medellín Cartel, who duped her into believing that she was going to interview guerilla leader Manuel Pérez. She was held in Copacabana until 25 January 1991, when she was killed during a botched rescue attempt by police.
12 September 1990	Davide Cervia	Unknown	Velletri, Italy	30	Unknown	Davide Cervia was kidnapped from his home in the Velletri countryside by a commando composed of at least four people. One of his neighbours witnessed the kidnapping but did not call the police on the spot. Cervia was a former member of the Italian Navy, a highly skilled technician in operating electronic warfare ELT/ETE/GE with the Oto-Melara OTOMAT system. According to some rumours coming from the Italian intelligence (SIOS), the kidnapping was arranged and managed by a Middle Eastern country (presumably Iraq) since Cervia was useful to train the Iraqi defence forces to use the Oto-Melara OTOMAT system soon after the start of the first Gulf War (2 August 1990). During his years of service in the Italian Navy, Cervia had a top-secret clearance. He was considered the most skilled operator of the Oto-Melara OTOMAT electronic system, which had also been supplied to Iraq. According to some other rumours, the list of countries potentially involved in the kidnapping includes (other than Iraq) Saudi Arabia, Libya, Iran, Somalia, and the Soviet Union (stealing of top-secret military information). To date, Cervia's fate is still unknown, although some sources claim he was killed in Baghdad during an air strike, and some others claim he was in captivity in Libya or Saudi Arabia.
22 October 1990	Jimmy Bernardo	Lewis Lent Jr.	(United States) Pittsfield, Massachusetts, U.S.	12	Murdered	12-year-old Jimmy Bernardo disappeared in Pittsfield, Massachusetts on 22 October 1990. His body was found by hunters several weeks later. Lewis Lent Jr., a confessed serial killer convicted of the later murder of Sara Anne Wood, confessed to Bernardo's murder. Lent claimed to have lured Bernardo into the Pittsfield movie theater where he worked as a custodian. Lent then held Bernardo overnight before driving him to Newfane, New York and strangling him to death.
November 1990	Helena Meriläinen	Unidentified serial killer	Järvenpää, Finland	39	Escaped	In November 1990, 39-year-old Helena Meriläinen left her friend's apartment around midnight and walked to a Järvenpää railway station, where she was approached by a man who offered her a ride home in his car. Meriläinen, under the influence of alcohol, accepted the man's offer. At the beginning of the trip, the man gave Meriläinen alcoholic beverages and capsules with an unknown substance in them, which both Meriläinen and the man consumed. Meriläinen fell asleep and awoke to find the car on a dark dirt road surrounded by forest. The man stopped the car on a dark gravel pit and tried to persuade Meriläinen to stay in the car for the night, though she refused. After Meriläinen exited the car to relieve herself, the man attacked her with a knife, though she fled to the forest and alerted help at a nearby house.
13 November 1990	Sano Fusako	Nobuyuki Satō	Niigata, Japan	10	Rescued	Fusako was abducted after a baseball game and held captive for slightly over nine years. She was found alive on 28 January 2000.
20 November 1990	John F. Grundhofer	Unknown	(United States) Minneapolis, U.S.	51	Rescued	Grundhofer was the chairman of Minnesota's second-largest bank. He was kidnapped from a downtown Minneapolis parking lot by a neatly dressed man whom authorities never found. He was bound, stuffed in a sleeping bag and left in a remote wooded area in Wisconsin, but escaped after approximately two hours of captivity.
8 December 1990	Crystal Leann Anzaldi	Unknown	(United States) San Diego, California, U.S.	14 months	Raised by person with unknown connection to abductor	Anzaldi was abducted by an unknown person and ended up in the care of Nilza Gierbolini Guzman, who brought her up as Sonia Guzmán in Luquillo, Puerto Rico. Anzaldi was found in November 1997 aged eight when Gierbolini was accused of child abuse, and her birth certificate was discovered to be falsified. She was identified as the missing child when her image was compared to those of several missing children and DNA tests were performed. Gierbolini denied any part in the abduction, claiming to have agreed to raise the child for a friend who said her mother had died, and was only found guilty of falsifying documents. After being recovered, Anzaldi was placed in the custody of her father.

== 1991 ==
Date	Victim(s)	Abductor(s)	Location	Age of victim(s)	Outcome	Notes
24 January 1991	Paola Illera	Arohn Kee	(United States) New York City, U.S.	13	Murdered	A 13-year-old schoolgirl abducted, raped and murdered by serial killer Arohn Kee. Illera's body was discovered hours after her murder; she had been repeatedly stabbed in the chest.
10 February 1991	Vicky Hamilton	Peter Tobin	Bathgate, Scotland	15	Murdered	Vicky Hamilton was kidnapped while waiting for a bus home in 1991. Serial killer Peter Tobin was found guilty of her murder in 2008 after her body was recovered from a property he owned.
16 March 1991	Jessica Keen	Marvin Lee Smith Jr.	(United States) West Jefferson, Ohio, U.S.	15	Murdered	Student who was abducted, raped and killed at a cemetery. Her body was discovered two days later, and her killer arrested in 2008.
4 April 1991	Angela Hammond	Unknown	(United States) Clinton, Missouri, U.S.	20	Unknown	Hammond was kidnapped from a parking lot at night whilst using a payphone to call her boyfriend. Her boyfriend chased a pickup truck for a couple of miles until his transmission broke down.
13 April 1991	Karmein Chan	Unknown	Templestowe, Victoria, Australia	13	Murdered	Karmein Chan was abducted at knifepoint by a masked burglar on the night of 13 April and found dead the following year. She was shot three times in the back of the head, execution-style, likely immediately after her abduction. The perpetrator was never identified, though it is suspected she may have been a victim of Mr. Cruel, an unidentified paedophile with a similar modus operandi.
25 May 1991	Timothy Wiltsey	Unknown	(United States) Sayreville, New Jersey, U.S.	5	Murdered	5-year-old Timothy Wiltsey disappeared while at a carnival with his mother, Michelle Lodzinski, who told police that he was abducted by two men and a woman she briefly left him with while she went to buy soda. His dead body was found in Edison the following year, and his death was ruled a homicide. Lodzinski herself was accused of her son's murder and was convicted 23 years later in 2014, but was acquitted on appeal after spending seven years in prison.
10 June 1991	Jaycee Lee Dugard	Phillip Garrido and Nancy Garrido	(United States) Meyers, California, U.S.	11	Rescued	Dugard was kidnapped while walking to her school bus stop, and held captive for 18 years. She was found alive on 26 August 2009 due to a tip from campus police officers at the University of California, Berkeley. During captivity she gave birth to two children who she homeschooled.
29 June 1991	Sheree Beasley	Robert Selby Lowe	Rosebud, Victoria, Australia	6	Murdered	The child was abducted while riding her bike unsupervised. Lowe apparently targeted Sheree because he saw her alone on previous occasions. She was raped and asphyxiated, and her body was found several months later. Lowe was convicted of her murder.
18 July 1991	Thomas Oliver	Provisional Irish Republican Army	(Republic of Ireland) Riverstown, Ireland	43	Murdered	Oliver was an Irish farmer who was abducted from his farm in County Louth and tortured and killed for allegedly being an informant for the Garda Síochána.
11 September 1991	Carrie Lawson	Jerry Bland	(United States) Jasper, Alabama, U.S.	25	Murdered	Lawson was a young lawyer kidnapped in a case bungled by the FBI. A ransom demand of $300,000 was made, which the family paid. The FBI inserted tracking devices in the money bag and on the delivery person, but both were on the same frequency and the FBI tracked the delivery person, leaving the money drop by mistake. After a break in the case, the FBI went to the home of suspect Jerry Bland, who refused entry. While officers retrieved a search warrant left in the car, the suspect retreated inside and shot himself, taking any information on Lawson's whereabouts to his grave. Neither she nor her remains were ever found. The ransom money was mostly recovered from the suspect's attic and vehicle.
10 October 1991	Brenda Thompson	Kenneth McDuff	(United States) Texas, U.S.	38	Murdered	Thompson and Moore were two sex workers murdered by serial killer Kenneth McDuff in October 1991. Their bodies was discovered in shallow graves several years later.
15 October 1991	Regina DeAnne Moore	Kenneth McDuff	(United States) Texas, U.S.	21	Murdered	Thompson and Moore were two sex workers murdered by serial killer Kenneth McDuff in October 1991. Their bodies was discovered in shallow graves several years later.
29 December 1991	Colleen Reed	Kenneth McDuff and Alva Hank Worley	(United States) Austin, Texas, U.S.	28	Murdered	28-year-old Colleen Reed was abducted from a car wash in Austin, Texas, by serial killer Kenneth McDuff and accomplice Alva Hank Worley on 29 December 1991. She was raped and tortured with cigarettes by both men, then murdered by McDuff.

== 1992 ==
Date	Image	Victim(s)	Abductor(s)	Location	Age of victim(s)	Outcome	Notes
11 January 1992		Shanda Renée Sharer	Melinda Loveless, Mary Tackett, Hope Rippey and Toni Lawrence	(United States) Madison, Indiana, U.S.	12	Murdered	A 12-year-old girl abducted via deception, then tortured and murdered by four teenage girls (aged 15 to 17). Sharer was ultimately burned alive. The motives for Sharer's murder soured between revenge and sexual jealousy for her having dated the girlfriend of one of her murderers.
24 February 1992		Valencia Kay Joshua	Kenneth McDuff	(United States) Texas, U.S.	22	Murdered	Joshua was a 22-year-old part-time sex worker last seen traveling to meet McDuff at his student dormitory. She was strangled to death and her body buried in a shallow field.
26 May 1992		Prince Pedro Thiago of Orléans-Braganza	Unknown	Petrópolis, Brazil	13	Rescued	Thiago was kidnapped on his way to school. He was rescued by police a week later from the house in a Rio de Janeiro suburb where he was held.
19 June 1992		Curtis Sliwa	Gambino crime family	(United States) New York City, New York, U.S.	38	Escaped	Sliwa was kidnapped by two members of the Gambino crime family. The two men had stolen a taxi and picked Sliwa up near his home in East Village, Manhattan. The kidnapper in the passenger seat leapt up and fired several shots at Sliwa hitting him five times in the groin and legs, however Sliwa was able to jump through the window of the taxi and escape. The kidnapping was motivated by Sliwa's remarks abouth John A. Gotti's father John Gotti.
25 June 1992		Unnamed woman	Clifford Miller	(United States) Kansas City, Missouri, U.S.	Unknown	Survived	Clifford Miller, older brother of serial killer Terry Blair, shot and abducted a woman at gunpoint and forced her to come with him to an abandoned house, where he orally raped her and beat her into unconsciousness. The victim survived, but required metal implants to her arm. Miller was sentenced to 240 years in prison in 1994.
6 September 1992		Corinne "Punky" Gustavson	Clifford Sleigh	Edmonton, Alberta, Canada	6	Murdered	Corinne was kidnapped from the front yard of her home by an unknown male. Two days later her body was found 9 kilometres (5.6 mi) away in an industrial yard. On 14 March 2003, new DNA techniques identified Clifford Sleigh, who was already serving time in an Alberta prison for another crime, as the suspect. He was given a life sentence on 27 May 2005.
8 September 1992		Pam Basu	Rodney Eugene Solomon and Bernard Eric Miller	(United States) Savage, Maryland, U.S.	34	Murdered	Basu was driving her 2-year-old daughter to preschool when she was carjacked by two assailants who tried to speed away. Basu's arm stuck in the seatbelt; she was dragged and eventually killed. Solomon was later sentenced to life imprisonment without parole, while Miller, a minor, was sentenced to life imprisonment.
23 September 1992		Džamba	Serb Volunteer Guard	Belgrade, Serbia	38–39	Unknown	Known as "The Don of Dorćol", Džamba was a Yugoslavian gangster based in Belgrade. On the day of his disappearance, he attempted to enter a casino while drunk and was beaten up by casino guards and thrown out, but he was never found. It is suspected that he was killed, but the prime suspect in the case was himself killed in 1997.
7 October 1992		Nikki Allan	David Boyd	Sunderland, Tyne and Wear, England	7	Murdered	Nikki Allan was kidnapped while walking home from her grandfather's flat and taken to a nearby derelict building, where she was beaten and stabbed to death. A man named George Heron was charged with the crime but was acquitted; years later, the true perpetrator, David Boyd, was found guilty after DNA evidence linked him to the crime.
13 November 1992		Miriam García Iborra	Antonio Anglés (allegedly), Miguel Ricart	Picassent, Valencia, Spain	14	Murdered	Three teenage girls who were abducted while visiting a nightclub in Picassent. All were found dead in a ditch 75 days later and were tortured and raped before their deaths. Prime suspect Antonio Anglés remains at large; his alleged accomplice, Miguel Ricart, was found guilty of involvement in the murders in 1997. The case is controversial, and both Ricart and the father of Miriam García claim he is the victim of a conspiracy.
13 November 1992		Antonia Gómez	Antonio Anglés (allegedly), Miguel Ricart	Picassent, Valencia, Spain	15	Murdered	Three teenage girls who were abducted while visiting a nightclub in Picassent. All were found dead in a ditch 75 days later and were tortured and raped before their deaths. Prime suspect Antonio Anglés remains at large; his alleged accomplice, Miguel Ricart, was found guilty of involvement in the murders in 1997. The case is controversial, and both Ricart and the father of Miriam García claim he is the victim of a conspiracy.
13 November 1992		Desirée Hernández	Antonio Anglés (allegedly), Miguel Ricart	Picassent, Valencia, Spain	14	Murdered	Three teenage girls who were abducted while visiting a nightclub in Picassent. All were found dead in a ditch 75 days later and were tortured and raped before their deaths. Prime suspect Antonio Anglés remains at large; his alleged accomplice, Miguel Ricart, was found guilty of involvement in the murders in 1997. The case is controversial, and both Ricart and the father of Miriam García claim he is the victim of a conspiracy.
13 December 1992		Nissim Toledano	Four Hamas members	Lod, Israel	29	Murdered	Senior Sgt. Toledano, an Israeli border policeman, was kidnapped while walking from home to attend his job. He was held in captivity by four members of Hamas, who demanded their leader Sheikh Ahmed Yassin be released. The request was refused, and Toledano's body was found two days later. All four killers were captured and sentenced to life imprisonment, and the case led the Israeli government to organize a crackdown on Palestinian fundamentalists.
28 December 1992		Katie Beers	John Esposito	(United States) Long Island, New York, U.S.	9	Released/rescued	Two days before her tenth birthday, Beers was lured into the home of John Esposito, a family friend. She was held captive inside a concrete bunker underneath Esposito's garage. He falsely claimed that Beers was kidnapped by a third party in an amusement park, but 17 days after the abduction, he took police to where he was holding her.
30 December 1992		Melissa McLauchlin	Joseph Gardner, Matthew Carl Mack, Matthew Paul Williams	(United States) North Charleston, South Carolina, U.S.	25	Murdered	McLauchlin, a white woman, was abducted by three black men who had vowed to kill a white woman as revenge for "400 years of oppression", including slavery. McLauchlin was repeatedly raped and beaten by the men before one of them, Joseph Gardner, shot her dead after she broke free from her restraints. Her body was disposed of by the highway in a neighbouring county.

== 1993 ==
Date	Victim(s)	Abductor(s)	Location	Age of victim(s)	Outcome	Notes
12 February 1993	James Bulger	Robert Thompson and Jon Venables	Merseyside, England	2	Murdered	Bulger was abducted from a Merseyside shopping centre by two ten-year-old boys. Later that day, the boys tortured Bulger to death and left his body on a train line.
19 February 1993	Jennifer Renee Odom	Jeffrey Norman Crum	(United States) Dade City, Florida, U.S.	12	Murdered	Jennifer Odom had stepped off a school bus, a short walk from her home in Florida, when she was kidnapped by an unknown abductor. Her body was found in an orange grove on 25 February 1993, nude and with signs of sexual assault and blunt force trauma. The case remains unsolved, however authorities identified a person or persons of interest, and lifted fingerprints from her backpack, which was found two years after her kidnapping along with her clarinet case . Police enlisted the help of psychic Nancy Myer, who apparently anticipated discovery of the two items, a consultation featured in the true crime documentary series Unsolved Mysteries with Dennis Farina (Season 6 Episode 1). Jeffrey Crum was charged with Jennifer Odom's murder in 2023 and was convicted of her murder in 2026.
24 June 1993	Jennifer Ertman	Peter Cantu, José Medellín, Derrick O'Brien, Efrain Pérez, Raul Villareal, Venancio Medellin	(United States) Oak Forest, Houston, U.S.	14	Murdered	Ertman and Peña were assaulted by a gang of six teenagers led by Peter Cantu after happening across their initiation ceremony. One gang member, José Medellín, sexually accosted Peña before attacking her when she resisted, at which point both Peña and Ertman were thrown to the ground and gang-raped before being dragged away and strangled to death. Three of the perpetrators were later executed despite efforts to save them by the International Court of Justice.
24 June 1993	Elizabeth Peña	Peter Cantu, José Medellín, Derrick O'Brien, Efrain Pérez, Raul Villareal, Venancio Medellin	(United States) Oak Forest, Houston, U.S.	16	Murdered	Ertman and Peña were assaulted by a gang of six teenagers led by Peter Cantu after happening across their initiation ceremony. One gang member, José Medellín, sexually accosted Peña before attacking her when she resisted, at which point both Peña and Ertman were thrown to the ground and gang-raped before being dragged away and strangled to death. Three of the perpetrators were later executed despite efforts to save them by the International Court of Justice.
28 June 1993	Eileen Sarmenta	Police personnel	Calauan, Philippines	Unknown	Murdered	Filipino students who were abducted, tortured and subsequently murdered by policemen on the orders of politician Antonio Sanchez. Sanchez was convicted and sentenced to two life terms.
28 June 1993	Allan Gomez	Police personnel	Calauan, Philippines	Unknown	Murdered	Filipino students who were abducted, tortured and subsequently murdered by policemen on the orders of politician Antonio Sanchez. Sanchez was convicted and sentenced to two life terms.
7 July 1993	Greg Nicholson	Dustin Honken, Angela Johnson	(United States) Mason City, Iowa, U.S.	34	Murdered	Nicholson was targeted by his criminal associates, Dustin Honken and Angela Johnson, to prevent him from testifying against Honken at an upcoming drug trial. The two of them took Nicholson, his girlfriend, Lori Duncan, and Lori's two daughters at gunpoint and drove them into the woods, where they shot all four and buried them in shallow graves.
7 July 1993	Lori Ann Duncan	Dustin Honken, Angela Johnson	(United States) Mason City, Iowa, U.S.	37	Murdered	Nicholson was targeted by his criminal associates, Dustin Honken and Angela Johnson, to prevent him from testifying against Honken at an upcoming drug trial. The two of them took Nicholson, his girlfriend, Lori Duncan, and Lori's two daughters at gunpoint and drove them into the woods, where they shot all four and buried them in shallow graves.
7 July 1993	Kandace Duncan	Dustin Honken, Angela Johnson	(United States) Mason City, Iowa, U.S.	10	Murdered	Nicholson was targeted by his criminal associates, Dustin Honken and Angela Johnson, to prevent him from testifying against Honken at an upcoming drug trial. The two of them took Nicholson, his girlfriend, Lori Duncan, and Lori's two daughters at gunpoint and drove them into the woods, where they shot all four and buried them in shallow graves.
7 July 1993	Amber Duncan	Dustin Honken, Angela Johnson	(United States) Mason City, Iowa, U.S.	6	Murdered	Nicholson was targeted by his criminal associates, Dustin Honken and Angela Johnson, to prevent him from testifying against Honken at an upcoming drug trial. The two of them took Nicholson, his girlfriend, Lori Duncan, and Lori's two daughters at gunpoint and drove them into the woods, where they shot all four and buried them in shallow graves.
5 August 1993	Yaron Chen	Hamas	Ramallah, West Bank, Palestine	20	Murdered	Pvt. Chen, an Israeli soldier, was intercepted while hitchhiking back home from a military base by a group of men driving a white Fiat van. They attempted to kidnap him, but he was killed in the ensuing struggle. Hamas member Fahed Sabri Barhan al-Shaludi was later convicted and sentenced to life imprisonment for the crime, but was released in 2011 as part of the Gilad Shalit prisoner exchange.
5 August 1993	Holly Piirainen	Unknown	(United States) Grafton, Massachusetts, U.S.	10	Murdered	Holly Piirainen was abducted while visiting a neighbour's house to see some puppies with her brother. Her body was found three months later. The case remains unsolved.
18 August 1993	Sara Ann Wood	Lewis Lent	(United States) Frankfort, New York, U.S.	12	Unknown	Wood disappeared on a quiet road near her home. Known murderer Lewis S. Lent Jr. was charged with abducting Wood in 1996, three years after she was last seen. Lent first claimed he killed Sara and buried her body in the Adirondacks, but when he drew a map of the burial location for the police, extensive searches did not produce any evidence of Wood's whereabouts. Lent had also pleaded guilty to the 1990 kidnapping and murder of 12-year-old Pittsfield, Massachusetts, native Jimmy Bernardo, who he abducted from a movie theater where he worked as a janitor. Lent later recanted to killing Wood, yet he was sentenced to 25-years-to-life for the Wood murder, and was sentenced to life without parole for the Bernardo murder, and is in prison in Massachusetts. He is suspected in other child kidnapping cases.
4 September 1993	Ashley Estell	Unknown	(United States) Plano, Texas, U.S.	7	Murdered	Estell was last seen with her parents at a soccer tournament at Carpenter Park heading to a playground. Michael Blair was convicted of the murder but later exonerated after a DNA test proved he was not the killer.
1 October 1993	Polly Klaas	Richard Allen Davis	(United States) Petaluma, California, U.S.	12	Murdered	Klaas was kidnapped from her home and strangled. Her abductor's vehicle got stuck in the mud a few miles from Klaas' house. A local police officer pulled him out of the mud, but did not query his license number with the police computer system or hear the BOLO (be on the lookout) broadcast to all CHP radios reporting that Davis was wanted for a parole violation. Davis was convicted of kidnapping and first-degree murder and sentenced to death. BOLOs are now broadcast to all police radios: state, county, and municipal.
17 November 1993	Alicia Yarbrough	Willie Pye	(United States) Georgia, U.S.	21	Murdered	Yarborough was abducted and murdered by her former lover, Willie Pye, in November 1993. The crime was committed with two accomplices, one of whom subsequently confessed to the trio's involvement to police. Pye was executed for the crime in 2024, while the other two, Anthony Freeman and Chester Adams, were sentenced to life in prison.
23 November 1993	Giuseppe Di Matteo	Sicilian Mafia	Altofonte, Sicily, Italy	13	Murdered	The son of Mafia informant Santino Di Matteo, he was abducted by the Sicilian Mafia in an attempt to silence his father. He was held captive for 779 days before being strangled to death and dissolved in a barrel of acid. A number of Mafiosi, including the high-ranking leader Giovanni Brusca, were convicted of involvement in the murder.

== 1994 ==
Date	Image	Victim(s)	Abductor(s)	Location	Age of victim(s)	Outcome	Notes
1994		Unnamed 15-year-old girl	Arohn Kee	(United States) New York City, U.S.	15	Released	Abducted and at knifepoint by serial killer and rapist Arohn Kee. The victim of this assault was then released.
1994		Shay Fima	Shlomo Helbrans	(United States) New York, U.S.	13	Rescued	Israeli-born rabbi Shlomo Helbrans was convicted of kidnapping the 13-year-old boy.
1994		Betty Lalam	Lord's Resistance Army militants	Amuru District, Uganda	14	Escaped	Schoolgirl who was abducted during a campaign of abductions of young children by members of the Lord's Resistance Army. After being held in captivity and forced to watch numerous tortures and killings, Lalam escaped in April 1995. Since then, she has become a teacher and a director at the Gulu War Affected Training Center.
18 February 1994		Pam Edwards	William Christopher Paul and Loran Kenstley Cole	(United States) Florida, U.S.	21	Rescued	Siblings John and Pam Edwards were attacked by two men at a camp site in Ocala National Forest, Florida. Cole bludgeoned John to death, and Pam was raped twice by the attackers but survived. Cole was convicted of the murder and sentenced to death, while Paul was sentenced to life imprisonment. 30 years after the murder, Cole was executed in 2024.
18 February 1994		John Edwards	William Christopher Paul and Loran Kenstley Cole	(United States) Florida, U.S.	18	Murdered	Siblings John and Pam Edwards were attacked by two men at a camp site in Ocala National Forest, Florida. Cole bludgeoned John to death, and Pam was raped twice by the attackers but survived. Cole was convicted of the murder and sentenced to death, while Paul was sentenced to life imprisonment. 30 years after the murder, Cole was executed in 2024.
20 February 1994		Hostages of the 1994 Peshawar school bus hijacking	Three Afghani militants	Peshawar, Pakistan	Various	Rescued	A school bus occupied by seven teachers and approximately 70 children was kidnapped by three Afghani militants which held them for ransom, demanding that they be provided with supplies and an escort to Kabul. The day after the kidnapping, all three assailants were killed by the Special Service Group.
21 February 1994		Vickie Deblieux	Carey Dale Grayson, Kenneth Loggins, Louis Mangione and Tracey Duncan	(United States) Jefferson County, Alabama, U.S.	37	Murdered	Deblieux was abducted, tortured and murdered by four youths while hitchhiking from Tennessee to her mother's house in Louisiana. Her body was discovered four days after the murder, and the police later arrested all four killers responsible. Three perpetrators – Mangione, Duncan and Loggins – were sentenced to life in prison while Grayson, the only adult of the four, was sentenced to death and executed on November 21, 2024.
27 April 1994		Carmen Gayheart	Anthony Floyd Wainwright and Richard Eugene Hamilton	(United States) Lake City, Florida, U.S.	23	Murdered	Gayheart, a nursing student and mother of two, was abducted and subsequently raped and murdered. Both perpetrators were on Florida's death row; Hamilton died of natural causes in 2023, while Wainwright was executed in 2025.
3 June 1994		Hacı Karay	Turkish Security Forces	Istanbul, Turkey	44	Murdered	Kurdish businessmen who were abducted by Turkish officers after allegations that they were affiliated with the PKK. Their bodies were found near a village road the day after their abduction.
3 June 1994		Savaş Buldan	Turkish Security Forces	Istanbul, Turkey	33	Murdered	Kurdish businessmen who were abducted by Turkish officers after allegations that they were affiliated with the PKK. Their bodies were found near a village road the day after their abduction.
3 June 1994		Adnan Yıldırım	Turkish Security Forces	Istanbul, Turkey	37	Murdered	Kurdish businessmen who were abducted by Turkish officers after allegations that they were affiliated with the PKK. Their bodies were found near a village road the day after their abduction.
30 June 1994		Rosie Palmer	Shaun Armstrong	Hartlepool, England	3	Murdered	Palmer was abducted and murdered shortly after buying an ice pop close to her home. Her body was found three days later in Armstrong's flat; he was subsequently sentenced to life imprisonment on 28 July 1995.
30 June 1994		Crystal Ann Tymich	Unknown	(United States) Los Angeles, California, U.S.	6	Unknown	Tymich was last seen playing near her house, wearing a pink T-shirt, floral shorts, and white Little Mermaid sneakers. She had been picking peaches with her three brothers, but they went inside and she was gone when they came back out to bring her home. None of the neighbors saw anything unusual.
3 July 1994		Lisa Abequa	Mohammed Abequa	(United States) Parsippany, New Jersey, U.S.	6	Rescued	Two siblings kidnapped by their father, who then fled to Jordan following the murder of their mother. Both siblings were later returned to the United States.
3 July 1994		Sami Abequa	Mohammed Abequa	(United States) Parsippany, New Jersey, U.S.	3	Rescued	Two siblings kidnapped by their father, who then fled to Jordan following the murder of their mother. Both siblings were later returned to the United States.
29 July 1994		Megan Kanka	Jesse Timmendequas	(United States) Hamilton Township, New Jersey, U.S.	7	Murdered	Kanka was lured into the home of a 33-year-old neighbor and convicted sex offender Jesse Timmendequas, who raped and murdered her. This led to the passing of "Megan's Law"; a federal law requiring authorities to make all information relating to convicted sex offenders available to the public.
14 August 1994		Jameika Porch	Unknown	(United States) Chattanooga, Tennessee, U.S.	4	Murdered	Porch was abducted from her bedroom at her grandmother's home. Her remains were discovered in 2000. It was determined that she was strangled by ligature shortly after she vanished.
17 August 1994		Mindy Tran	Unknown	Kelowna, British Columbia, Canada	8	Murdered	Tran disappeared from her neighbourhood just after supper. She rode her bike down her quiet street and vanished. Hundreds of people searched for the girl but her body wasn't found until six weeks later when a man with a divining rod led police to a shallow grave near her parents' home. She had been sexually assaulted and strangled.
12 September 1994		Michael Anthony Hughes	Franklin Delano Floyd	(United States) Choctaw, Oklahoma, U.S.	6	Unknown	Hughes was abducted from his elementary school by his stepfather, Franklin Delano Floyd. Two months later, Floyd was arrested in Kentucky, but the boy was not with him. He gave inconsistent statements regarding the boy's whereabouts, but Hughes was never located. It was later discovered that Hughes' mother, Sharon Marshall, was not only Floyd's wife, but was actually raised by Floyd from an early age and was herself kidnapped by Floyd. She died when Hughes was two years old. Floyd is the prime suspect in her murder as well.
25 September 1994		Lounès Matoub	Armed Islamic Group	Algeria	38	Released	Matoub, a popular Berber singer and activist, was kidnapped by the Armed Islamic Group in 1994 to stop him from promoting secularist causes. He was held prisoner in a militant camp for two weeks during which time he was sentenced to death by his captors, but was ultimately released alive after his supporters threatened "total war" on the Islamists. He was murdered by the same group four years later after refusing to stop his advocacy.
26 September 1994		Lisa Rene	Orlando Hall, Bruce Webster, Demetrius Hall, Steven Beckley	(United States) Arlington, Texas, U.S.	16	Murdered	Lisa Rene was abducted from her apartment by four drug dealers who were swindled on a deal by her brother Neil. The kidnappers drove her to Pine Bluff, Arkansas and raped her multiple times before beating her with a shovel and burying her alive in a shallow grave. The ringleader, Orlando Hall, was executed in 2020.
29 September–19 October 1994		Myles Croston	Harkat-ul-Ansar	Delhi, India	Various	Rescued	Three British and one American tourist were lured by terrorists and held hostage to demand the release of ten prisoners. The American hostage, Béla Nuss, was found by police on 31 October and directed them to where the other three were held. Three kidnappers were sentenced to death; a fourth, Ahmed Omar Saeed Sheikh, was released in a prisoner exchange and later participated in the kidnap and murder of Daniel Pearl in 2002.
29 September–19 October 1994		Paul Rideout	Harkat-ul-Ansar	Delhi, India	Various	Rescued	Three British and one American tourist were lured by terrorists and held hostage to demand the release of ten prisoners. The American hostage, Béla Nuss, was found by police on 31 October and directed them to where the other three were held. Three kidnappers were sentenced to death; a fourth, Ahmed Omar Saeed Sheikh, was released in a prisoner exchange and later participated in the kidnap and murder of Daniel Pearl in 2002.
29 September–19 October 1994		Rhys Partridge	Harkat-ul-Ansar	Delhi, India	Various	Rescued	Three British and one American tourist were lured by terrorists and held hostage to demand the release of ten prisoners. The American hostage, Béla Nuss, was found by police on 31 October and directed them to where the other three were held. Three kidnappers were sentenced to death; a fourth, Ahmed Omar Saeed Sheikh, was released in a prisoner exchange and later participated in the kidnap and murder of Daniel Pearl in 2002.
29 September–19 October 1994		Béla Nuss	Harkat-ul-Ansar	Delhi, India	Various	Rescued	Three British and one American tourist were lured by terrorists and held hostage to demand the release of ten prisoners. The American hostage, Béla Nuss, was found by police on 31 October and directed them to where the other three were held. Three kidnappers were sentenced to death; a fourth, Ahmed Omar Saeed Sheikh, was released in a prisoner exchange and later participated in the kidnap and murder of Daniel Pearl in 2002.
9 October 1994		Nachshon Wachsman	Hamas militants	Bnei Atarot, Israel	19	Murdered	Nachshon Wachsman, a 19-year-old Israel Defense Forces soldier, was abducted by Hamas militants from the Bnei Atarot junction in central Israel and held hostage for six days. The incident ended in an unsuccessful Israeli rescue attempt, which resulted in the deaths of Wachsman, three captors, and an Israeli officer.
7 November 1994		Lindsay Rimer	Unknown	Hebden Bridge, West Yorkshire, England	13	Murdered	Schoolgirl Rimer disappeared after going to her local SPAR shop to buy cornflakes. She was captured on CCTV paying for them, but never seen alive again. Five months later, her body was found about a mile away in the town's canal at an isolated spot. Police believed she was taken from the streets that night by an unknown offender while walking home, driven to the location where she was found, and dumped in the canal. This was supported by the fact that she was found wearing the same clothing she was wearing that night. Her abduction and murder remains unsolved although a DNA profile was isolated in 2016.
20 November 1994		Stacy Rae Errickson	Marcel Wayne Williams	(United States) Jacksonville, Arkansas, U.S.	22	Murdered	Errickson was abducted near a gas station on the way to work, and her abductor, Marcel Williams, raped and murdered her near the Arkansas River. Williams confessed to the crime when he was arrested nine days later for unrelated cases of rape, and he was therefore charged, convicted and sentenced to death for murdering Errickson. Williams was executed on April 24, 2017.
18 December 1994		Alison Botha	Frans du Toit, Theuns Kruger	Port Elizabeth, South Africa	27	Survived	Kruger and du Toit, both Satanists, abducted Botha at knifepoint, raped her, stabbed her dozens of times and slashed her throat before leaving her for dead. She miraculously survived, and both her attackers were later jailed for life.

== 1995 ==
Date	Image	Victim(s)	Abductor(s)	Location	Age of victim(s)	Outcome	Notes
6 January 1995		Melanie Carpenter	Fernard Auger	Surrey, British Columbia, Canada	23	Murdered	Carpenter was abducted from a Fleetwood Town Centre tanning salon, and was found dead three weeks later, concealed by a white blanket, in a crevice near an isolated road, four kilometres north of Yale, B.C.
18 February 1995		Tracie McBride	Louis Jones	(United States) Goodfellow Air Force Base, San Angelo, Texas, U.S.	19	Murdered	Jones, a U.S. serviceman suffering from Gulf War syndrome, abducted fellow soldier McBride from Goodfellow Air Base after failing to find his initial target, his ex-wife. He sexually assaulted McBride, drove her into Coke County and beat her to death with a tire iron.
c. 1 March 1995		Unnamed 14-year-old Latina girl	John Jamelske	(United States) Syracuse, New York, U.S.	14	Released	A victim of serial rapist and kidnapper John Jamelske. Jamelske abducted this individual on an unknown date in March 1995. She was held captive for fifteen months before being released in the summer of 1996.
3 March 1995		Tarık Ümit	Special operations officers	Marmaris, Turkey	47	Murdered	Turkish intelligence official in the National Intelligence Organization kidnapped and murdered in March 1995. He is believed to be buried in Tekirdağ.
14 May 1995		Chadrel Rinpoche	CCP agents	Chengdu, China	55	Unknown	Gelug lama of Tibet who was abducted and placed under arbitrary house arrest by police officials. He reportedly died from a suspicious poisoning in 2011, but his remains have never been recovered.
June 1995		Malcolm Friedman	Chevie Kehoe	United States	Unknown	Survived	In June 1995, Chevie Kehoe and an accomplice kidnapped and robbed Malcolm and Jill Friedman, a couple believed to be Jewish, who owned a store at which Kehoe was once employed. Kehoe is currently serving three consecutive life sentences for the kidnapping, torture, and murder of a family, while his accomplice, Daniel Lewis Lee, was sentenced to death for the murders, and was executed on July 14, 2020.
June 1995		Jill Friedman	Chevie Kehoe	United States	Unknown	Survived	In June 1995, Chevie Kehoe and an accomplice kidnapped and robbed Malcolm and Jill Friedman, a couple believed to be Jewish, who owned a store at which Kehoe was once employed. Kehoe is currently serving three consecutive life sentences for the kidnapping, torture, and murder of a family, while his accomplice, Daniel Lewis Lee, was sentenced to death for the murders, and was executed on July 14, 2020.
9 June 1995		Morgan Nick	Unknown	(United States) Alma, Arkansas, U.S.	6	Unknown	Nick was at a baseball game with her mother. She was last seen at her car after catching fireflies with her friends, and she was also seen talking to a man who police believe was her abductor. She has not been found; her mother started a foundation to help families with missing children. In 2024 police announced that DNA evidence pointed to pedophile Billy Lincks, who died in prison in 2000, being the abductor, but the case officially remains open.
30 July 1995		Sophie Hook	Howard Hughes	Llandudno, Wales	7	Murdered	English girl who was abducted from a tent while camping in her uncle's garden, with her body found several hours later. Soon after, Howard Hughes, who would later be revealed as a prolific child rapist, was arrested, convicted and sentenced to life imprisonment for her murder.
11 September 1995		Jaswant Singh Khalra	Punjab police officers	Amritsar, Punjab, India	42	Murdered	Sikh human rights activist who was abducted, tortured and killed by officers of Punjab police after exposing widespread unlawful killings of Sikhs by the agency. Six police officers were found guilty of his murder in 2005.
11 September 1995		Jimmy Ryce	Juan Carlos Chavez	(United States) Redland, Florida, U.S.	9	Murdered	Ryce was supposed to be coming home from school but never came back. Juan Carlos Chavez took responsibility and led police to the body he had sexually assaulted, decapitated, and dismembered.
16 September 1995		Jessyca Mullenburg	Steven Oliver	(United States) Eau Claire, Wisconsin, U.S.	13	Rescued	Oliver met Mullenberg when he was an aide at her school and became obsessed with her. He followed her and her father as they moved to two locations in Wisconsin. He eventually moved across the street from the Mullenbergs in Eau Claire. Oliver told Mullenburg that a publisher was interested in a story she wrote; she agreed to go with him in his car. Mullenberg dozed off in the car, and when she awoke, her feet and hands were bound. After an eight-hour drive to Kansas City, Mullenberg and Oliver boarded a plane to Houston, where she spent the majority of her three-and-a-half-month captivity in a motel room. Mullenberg says that physical, sexual and mental abuse were common. Within weeks, Oliver convinced Mullenberg that her parents didn't want to get her back and didn't love her. Mullenberg says she became so disconnected from reality that she remembered very little from her past. A chance viewing of America's Most Wanted on television confirmed the manager's suspicions that Oliver was up to something. Immediately after recognizing Oliver's photo on the show, calls were placed to law enforcement and the FBI. Authorities who raced to the hotel knew who Mullenberg was, but after months in captivity, she did not. Only after authorities showed Mullenberg pictures from her past did she come back to reality.
16 November 1995		Elijah Evans	Jacqueline Williams, Fedell Caffey, Lavern Ward	(United States) Addison, Illinois, U.S.	Fetus	Rescued	Deborah Evans was nine months pregnant when she was murdered and her unborn son cut from her womb. Evans had three other children: 10-year-old Samantha, 7-year-old Joshua, and 18-month-old Jordan. Evans' ex-boyfriend Laverne Ward was the father of Jordan and the unborn baby. Williams faked a pregnancy to keep her boyfriend, Fedell Caffey. Caffey was aware that Williams was not pregnant, and participated in the abduction and murder. Evans had a restraining order against Ward but allowed the trio into her home. Williams, Ward and Caffey killed Evans and Samantha in their home and abducted Joshua, killing him the next day. His body was found in an alley in a nearby town. Williams convinced friends and family that she gave birth to the infant. Jordan was left unharmed in the house with the bodies of his mother and sister. Police were called to the house by Evans' current boyfriend and tracked down the killers and the stolen infant. When police took the baby from Williams she screamed, "That is my baby!" Williams received two life terms, and Ward one life term. Caffey was given the death penalty.
1995		Roxanne Ellis	Robert Acremant	(United States) Medford, Oregon, U.S.	53	Murdered	A lesbian couple who were kidnapped and murdered by Robert Acremant.
1995		Michelle Abdill	Robert Acremant	(United States) Medford, Oregon, U.S.	42	Murdered	A lesbian couple who were kidnapped and murdered by Robert Acremant.
7 December 1995		Barbara Barnes	Unknown	(United States) Steubenville, Ohio, U.S.	13	Murdered	Victim was abducted while walking to school. Her body was found months later. The case remains unsolved.
20 December 1995		Petrisi Losi	Yanis Baltass	Kilkis, Greece	20	Murdered	Petrisi Losi and Paugin Legisi were abducted and murdered.
20 December 1995		Paugin Legisi	Yanis Baltass	Kilkis, Greece	25	Murdered	Petrisi Losi and Paugin Legisi were abducted and murdered.

== 1996 ==
Date	Image	Victim(s)	Abductor(s)	Location	Age of victim(s)	Outcome	Notes
13 January 1996		Amber Hagerman	Unknown	(United States) Arlington, Texas, U.S.	9	Murdered	Hagerman was kidnapped while riding her bike near her grandparents' home. She was found four days later by a hiker and his dog, naked in a creek bed. An autopsy revealed she had been alive for two days, and then had been raped and had her throat slit. Although a $75,000 reward was offered for information leading to Hagerman's killer, he was never found. The task force investigating Amber's murder was dissolved in June 1997. Her murder inspired the creation of the Amber alert system.
17 January 1996		José Antonio Ortega Lara	ETA	Burgos, Spain	38	Rescued	On 17 January 1996 José Antonio Ortega Lara was kidnapped in the garage of his home in Burgos when returning from his work in the prison of Logroño. Days later, ETA said they were responsible for the kidnapping and demanded the transfer of ETA prisoners to Basque prisons in exchange for his release. The conditions of his kidnapping were painful: the dungeon in which he was kept was very wet (it was a few meters from the river Deva), there were no windows and it measured 3 meters long by 2.5 wide and 1.8 m high inside. Ortega Lara could only take three steps on it. He had a small light bulb and was only fed fruits and vegetables. He could not leave the cabin and made his physiological needs at a urinal, on which he also received the water to wash himself. At the time of his rescue by Spanish police, Ortega Lara had lost 23 kilos, muscle mass and bone density. He suffered from sleep disorders, post-traumatic stress, anxiety and depression.
27 January 1996		Tamika Black	Dustin Higgs, Willis Haynes	(United States) Laurel, Maryland, U.S.	19	Murdered	Black, Jackson, and Chinn left Higgs' apartment after an argument. Higgs and Haynes followed them, picked them up, and offered to drive them back to Washington, D.C. Instead, Higgs drove to the Patuxent Wildlife Research Center, where he forced the women to exit the car before Haynes shot them. Higgs, who allegedly directed the murders, received the death penalty whilst Haynes was sentenced to life imprisonment.
27 January 1996		Tanji Jackson	Dustin Higgs, Willis Haynes	(United States) Laurel, Maryland, U.S.	21	Murdered	Black, Jackson, and Chinn left Higgs' apartment after an argument. Higgs and Haynes followed them, picked them up, and offered to drive them back to Washington, D.C. Instead, Higgs drove to the Patuxent Wildlife Research Center, where he forced the women to exit the car before Haynes shot them. Higgs, who allegedly directed the murders, received the death penalty whilst Haynes was sentenced to life imprisonment.
27 January 1996		Mishann Chinn	Dustin Higgs, Willis Haynes	(United States) Laurel, Maryland, U.S.	23	Murdered	Black, Jackson, and Chinn left Higgs' apartment after an argument. Higgs and Haynes followed them, picked them up, and offered to drive them back to Washington, D.C. Instead, Higgs drove to the Patuxent Wildlife Research Center, where he forced the women to exit the car before Haynes shot them. Higgs, who allegedly directed the murders, received the death penalty whilst Haynes was sentenced to life imprisonment.
February 1996		Tanya Nicole Kach	Thomas Hose	(United States) McKeesport, Pennsylvania, U.S.	15	Rescued	Kach was manipulated by high school guard Thomas Hose and convinced to run away with him. Kach was imprisoned in his bedroom and left with a bucket as a toilet, regularly sexually abused, and only let out of the house under strict conditions and curfew, under the alias "Nikki Allen". On 21 March 2006, she finally came to grips with her kidnapping and reported to a local grocery store owner, who called the police and arrested Hose. Kach has tried numerous times to file endangerment lawsuits, all being thrown out in court, and she has been counter-sued by family and friends under grounds of plagiarism and defamation.
9 May 1996		Nina Yefimova	Unknown	Gronzy, Russia	25	Murdered	25-year-old Nina Yefimova and her 73-year-old mother were found murdered a day after they were abducted from their apartment on the outskirts of Grozny, Russia. It was believed that Yefimova was targeted due to her news coverage of crime in Chechnya. The murderers were never caught.
9 May 1996		Nina Yefimova's mother	Unknown	Gronzy, Russia	73	Murdered	25-year-old Nina Yefimova and her 73-year-old mother were found murdered a day after they were abducted from their apartment on the outskirts of Grozny, Russia. It was believed that Yefimova was targeted due to her news coverage of crime in Chechnya. The murderers were never caught.
17 May 1996		Le-Zhan Williams	Latasha Ann Brown	(United States) Vallejo, California, U.S.	3 weeks	Rescued	Baby Le-Zhan's mother, Daphne Boyden, was shot and her house was burned down, with no sign of her son. He was found six years later living as the son of Latasha Brown. His father, rapper Young Lay, was serving a prison sentence when his son was found.
28 May 1996		Sabine Dardenne	Marc Dutroux	Tournai, Belgium	12	Rescued	Dardenne was kidnapped and raped by Dutroux, a serial killer, while on her way to school. She was rescued after 80 days, on 15 August 1996, with 14-year-old Laetitia Delhez, who had also been kidnapped.
9 June 1996		Melanie Hall	Unknown white male described as approximately 27 (53 in 2022), 5 ft 10ins, of medium build, with dark brown hair and eyes and wearing a brown silk shirt and flashy gold watch	Cadillacs nightclub, Bath, England	25	Murdered	Melanie Hall disappeared from Cadillacs nightclub in Bath after talking and dancing with an unknown man. Several witnesses reported seeing a woman matching Hall's description later arguing with a man outside the club and being coaxed reluctantly into a car park. In 2009, Hall's remains were found next to a slip road of the M5 motorway near Thornbury, South Gloucestershire. Her murder remains unsolved, although in 2013 police revealed that a white Volkswagen Golf GTi cabriolet may have been involved in her abduction.
4 July 1996		Cynthia Allinger	Guy Matthew Rasmussen	(United States) Lakewood, Washington, U.S.	9	Murdered	Cynthia "Cyndi" Allinger was a 9-year-old girl recently moved with her mother and sisters to Lakeview, Washington. Her mother left for an errand while Cyndi played at a park nearby on 4 July 1996. She did not return home, and was found roughly two weeks later, rolled up in a carpet at a grassy region near her home; she had been raped and strangled. Police interviewed suspects and persons of interest before linking crime scene and forensic evidence to Guy Rasmussen, a former rock band musician who resided nearby. Rasmussen was convicted of Cyndi's kidnapping, sexual assault and murder, and sentenced to life in prison without parole. He maintained his innocence and filed a motion, supported by the Innocence Project, for a re-test of DNA evidence in 2014, but no reports have emerged from this, and he remains imprisoned for the crime as of summer 2020. The case drew significant and ongoing media attention due to the horror of the tragic murder and the concerns it raised surrounding "latchkey kids" and "stranger danger", as well as discussions surrounding the perpetrator of the crime and the sequence of events involved. The case has been covered in numerous TV documentaries including Nightmare Next Door ("Little Girl Lost"), The Face of Evil ("The Root of All Evil") and Forensic Files ("Seedy Intentions").
26 July 1996		Piper Streyle	Robert Leroy Anderson	(United States) Canistota, South Dakota, U.S.	28	Murdered	Streyle, a mother of two, was abducted in front of her children by Robert Leroy Anderson, who barged into her home and kidnapped her at gunpoint. Anderson raped and murdered her. He was sentenced to life in prison for kidnapping Streyle, but after the revelation of her murder, was tried, convicted and sentenced to death for killing her and another woman in 1994. He committed suicide in 2003.
9 August 1996		Laetitia Delhez	Marc Dutroux	Tournai, Belgium	14	Rescued	Dutroux kidnapped Delhez after another victim, Sabine Dardenne, requested a companion because she felt so alone. They were rescued on 15 August 1996. Earlier victims included eight-year-olds Melissa Russo and Julie Lejeune, who died of starvation while Dutroux was in prison for car theft, and seventeen-year-old An Marchal and nineteen-year-old Eefje Lambrechts, who were buried alive
1 October 1996		Jakub Fiszman	Rainer Körppen and Sven Körppen	Eschborn, Germany	40	Murdered	Fiszman, a millionaire, was held for ransom. He was killed by his kidnappers even though the ransom for him was paid. The perpetrators were arrested on 19 October and received long prison sentences.
25 October 1996		Randy Chan	Roman Mann	Vancouver, Canada	Unknown	Released	Chan was kidnapped by Roman Mann, an associate of Bindy Johal, and was held for 50 to 56 hours.
4 November 1996		DeAnn Emerald Mu'min	Howard Ault	(United States) Fort Lauderdale, Florida, U.S.	11	Murdered	Sisters DeAnn Mu'min and Alicia Jones were kidnapped and lured into the apartment of Howard Ault, who promised to give them candy. Ault, a child sex offender, raped the older sister, Mu'min, before he strangled both girls to death and hid their bodies in his attic. Ault was found guilty of the murder of both sisters and sentenced to death.
4 November 1996		Alicia Sybilla Jones	Howard Ault	(United States) Fort Lauderdale, Florida, U.S.	9	Murdered	Sisters DeAnn Mu'min and Alicia Jones were kidnapped and lured into the apartment of Howard Ault, who promised to give them candy. Ault, a child sex offender, raped the older sister, Mu'min, before he strangled both girls to death and hid their bodies in his attic. Ault was found guilty of the murder of both sisters and sentenced to death.
9 November 1996		Adam O'Brien	Gary O'Brien	Torbay, Newfoundland and Labrador, Canada	14	Unknown	Three brothers who were abducted by their father Gary O'Brien during a custodial visit in November 1996. Neither O'Brien nor any of his children have been located.
9 November 1996		Trevor O'Brien	Gary O'Brien	Torbay, Newfoundland and Labrador, Canada	11	Unknown	Three brothers who were abducted by their father Gary O'Brien during a custodial visit in November 1996. Neither O'Brien nor any of his children have been located.
9 November 1996		Mitchell O'Brien	Gary O'Brien	Torbay, Newfoundland and Labrador, Canada	4	Unknown	Three brothers who were abducted by their father Gary O'Brien during a custodial visit in November 1996. Neither O'Brien nor any of his children have been located.
17 November 1996		Kara Rudd	Joseph Kondro	(United States) Longview, Washington, U.S.	12	Murdered	Kondro, who knew Rudd and her mother, took Rudd to a swimming hole in Germany Creek, and then to an abandoned house near the Columbia River. There he raped and strangled her, and placed her body in an abandoned Volkswagen in a ravine. Kondro aroused investigators' suspicions after his car was sighted near where Rudd had disappeared, and due to visible scratches on his person from a girl's long nails. The Volkswagen acted as a refrigerator, preserving enough forensic evidence to allow Kondro's arrest and conviction. Kondro was also suspected in the prior kidnappings, sexual assaults and murders of two eight-year-old girls: Rima Traxler, also from Longview, and Chila Silvernails, from nearby Kalama. Although he did not admit to Silvernails' murder, he confessed to Traxler's in a plea deal that avoided the death penalty, explaining that he had learned of the young girl's "safety password" provided by her mother, which he used to deceive her into coming with him. He was sentenced to a term of 55 years' incarceration, and died in prison. Kondro was dubbed "The Longview Serial Killer" by author Lori Carangelo, and Rudd's and Traxler's abductions and the detective work that apprehended Kondro featured in several true crime documentaries, including On the Case with Paula Zahn (episode "Broken Trust") and Cold Case Files ("Unicorns and Alligators").
20 December 1996		Juli Busken	Anthony Sanchez	(United States) Oklahoma, U.S.	21	Murdered	21-year-old Juli Busken, a University of Oklahoma dance student and resident of Benton, Arkansas, was abducted from her apartment's parking lot and raped and shot to death by an unknown assailant. The case remained unsolved for eight years before 25-year-old convicted burglar Anthony Castillo Sanchez was arrested after the DNA profile of the killer was matched to his DNA. Sanchez was convicted and sentenced to death for murdering Busken, and executed on 21 September 2023.

== 1997 ==
Date	Image	Victim(s)	Abductor(s)	Location	Age of victim(s)	Outcome	Notes
1997		Tiffany Furlan	Christopher John Lewis	Great Barrier Island, New Zealand	6 weeks	Abandoned by kidnapper	Christopher John Lewis murdered Tania Furlan, a young mother in Great Barrier Island, and kidnapped her infant daughter, who he then abandoned outside a nearby church.
31 January 1997		Rosalynn McGinnis	Henri Piette	(United States) Poteau, Oklahoma, U.S.	12	Escaped	Kidnapped by her stepfather and relocated to Mexico along with his three other children. McGinnis gave birth to nine children by her kidnapper. McGinnis and eight of her nine children escaped in June 2016, able to return to US; her eldest had already left home but reunited later. Eventually Piette was apprehended in Mexico City (while seeking a passport), and placed in U.S. custody.
7 February 1997		Douglas Gissendaner	Kelly Gissendaner and Gregory Bruce Owen	(United States) Gwinnett County, Georgia, U.S.	30	Murdered	Douglas Gissendaner was murdered by his wife and her lover. His wife was sentenced to death in 1998, with her lover testifying against her in a plea agreement. She was executed in 2015.
14 April 1997		Pai Hsiao-yen	Chen Chien-hsing	Taipei, Taiwan	16	Murdered	Hsiao-yen, the daughter of TV personality Pai Bing-bing, was kidnapped on her way to school in Taipei. Following numerous unsuccessful ransom negotiations, due to heavy media coverage, Hsiao-yen was gang-raped and eventually murdered, with her body being discovered on 28 April. Following a year-long manhunt which resulted in accomplices committing suicide upon arrest, Chen, who masterminded the kidnapping, was arrested on 18 November after taking the Alexander family hostage. Chen was convicted and executed on 6 October 1999. The incident has received criticism for its inappropriate media coverage ethics.
30 April 1997		Zephany Nurse	Lavona Solomon	Cape Town, South Africa	2 days	Raised by abductor	Zephany was taken shortly after birth and raised by the kidnapper's family as one of their own under the name Miché Solomon. She was found when her biological sister started at the same school, and friends commented that they looked like sisters.
6 May 1997		Kerry Whelan	Bruce Burrell	Sydney, New South Wales, Australia	39	Murdered	A woman was believed to have been murdered by her employer. Her body has never been found, but Burrell was convicted in 2006 during his second trial.
10 May 1997		Yelena Masyuk	Chechen rebels	Grozny, Chechnya, Russia	31	Released	Masyuk is a Russian television journalist. She and two others were kidnapped by Chechen insurgents on 10 May 1997; all three were released after 101 days of captivity following the payment of a $2 million ransom to secure their release.
13 May 1997		Sean Brown	Loyalist Volunteer Force (suspected)	Bellaghy, Northern Ireland, U.K.	61	Murdered	Brown, chairman of the Bellaghy Sports Centre, was abducted at the gate of the complex after a brief violent struggle at around 11:36 am, by multiple members of the LVF, and was shoved in the trunk of his Ford Sierra. Brown was then driven around 10.2 miles near Randalstown and shot six times in the head and then his car was set on fire, at 11:45 am. It's believed he was killed in reprisal for the murder of RUC constable Darren Bradshaw who was murdered by the INLA at a gay bar in Belfast.
16 May 1997		Sandra Sapaugh	William Lewis Reece	(United States) Webster, Texas, U.S.	19	Escaped	Sapaugh was lured into serial killer William Lewis Reece's vehicle upon the ruse of assistance after her vehicle suffered a flat tire. She was overpowered and her wrists bound, although she managed to loosen her restraints and jump from Reece's truck as it drove along the I-45.
3 June 1997		Rachel Timmerman	Marvin Gabrion	(United States) Cedar Springs, Michigan, U.S.	19	Murdered	Shannon and her mother Rachel Timmerman were last seen leaving on a date with an unknown co-worker of Timmerman. The co-worker was later linked to a man named Marvin Gabrion, whom Rachel was preparing to testify against for raping her the previous year. Rachel's body was later found floating in Oxford lake. Gabrion is on death row for the murder. Shannon has never been found. Although Gabrion was not tried for killing Shannon, the jury found beyond a reasonable doubt that he was responsible for her death.
3 June 1997		Shannon Verhage	Marvin Gabrion	(United States) Cedar Springs, Michigan, U.S.	11 months	Unknown	
10 July 1997		Miguel Ángel Blanco	ETA	Ermua, Basque Country, Spain	29	Murdered	On 10 July 1997, Spanish politician of Partido Popular Miguel Ángel Blanco was kidnapped by terrorist group ETA which threatened to assassinate him unless the Spanish Government started to transfer all ETA prisoners to prisons in the Basque Country within 48 hours. Hundreds of thousands of people gathered in demonstrations all throughout Spain, demanding the release of Miguel Ángel. But 50 minutes after the deadline expired, at 16:50 of 12 July, he was shot in the back of the head. Shortly thereafter, he was found on the outskirts of San Sebastián, in the throes of death, with his hands tied. He died in the hospital at 4:30 a.m. on 13 July.
29 July 1997		Nancy Adleman	Arthur Lee Burton	(United States) Houston, Texas, U.S.	48	Murdered	Nancy Adleman was abducted while out jogging, sexually assaulted, beaten, strangled and dumped near Brays Bayou. Her killer, Arthur Lee Burton, was sentenced to death.
16 September 1997		Brittney Ann Beers	Unknown	(United States) Sturgis, Michigan, U.S.	6	Unknown	6-year-old Brittney was last seen in the early evening after going out to ride her bicycle. Her mother left to do errands. Her half-brother said he saw his sister sitting on a bench. Others saw her speaking to an unidentified male driving a red or brown mid-size vehicle. Brittney walked over to the witness and told him that she 'made a new friend'. She was never seen again. In 2016 there was a significant lead after a killer confessed to the murder of Jodi Parrack. Similarities in the cases raised red flags. The murderer of Jodi Parrack, Daniel Furlong, said that he did not kill Brittney after an hours-long interrogation. The case remains open.
21 September 1997		Guo Xinzhen	Hu Mou and "Tang"	Liaocheng, China	2	Rescued	Xinzhen was abducted from outside his home in 1997 by Hu Mou and his girlfriend, "Tang". The two kidnappers then sold him to a couple in central China for money. He was only found twenty-four years later when police used databases to find out what he would look like as an adult, and his identity was confirmed by DNA testing.
30 September 1997		Walter Kwok	Cheung Chi Keung	Hong Kong	47	Released	Kwok was kidnapped by the notorious gangster "Big Spender" Cheung Chi Keung and was released seven days later without police intervention. Following his arrest in Guangzhou in 1998, Cheung confessed that he put Kwok in a wooden container blindfolded for four days and fed him regular meals of roast pork with rice, until the ransom of HK$600 million was paid.
14 November 1997		Kazue Perron	Lenard Philmore and Anthony Spann	(United States) West Palm Beach, Florida, U.S.	44	Murdered	Kazue Perron, a Japanese citizen, was carjacked, abducted and murdered by Lenard Philmore and Anthony Spann, who both planned to steal Perron's car in order to use as a getaway vehicle for an upcoming bank robbery. Perron's body was found a week after her death and both men were charged and found guilty of first-degree murder and sentenced to death in separate trials in 2000.
24 November 1997		Sabrina Aisenberg	Unknown	(United States) Tampa, Florida, U.S.	5 months	Unknown	Sabrina vanished from her crib without a trace. Her parents, Steve and Marlene Aisenberg, were the last to see her alive, when they placed her in her crib Sunday night. In the morning Sabrina and her blanket were gone. She is still missing.
15 December 1997		Delimar Vera Cuevas	Carolyn Correa	(United States) Frankford, Philadelphia, Pennsylvania, U.S.	10 days	Raised by abductor	Cuevas was a baby when she was thought to have been killed in a fire. Six years later, her mother discovered her at a birthday party. After DNA tests confirmed that the child was indeed her own, the kidnapper was arrested. The story was later dramatized in the Lifetime Movie Network film Little Girl Lost: The Delimar Vera Story.

== 1998 ==
Date	Image	Victim(s)	Abductor(s)	Location	Age of victim(s)	Outcome	Notes
1998		Mary Quin	Islamic militants	Yemen	unknown	Escaped	American-New Zealand national and chief executive of Callaghan Innovation who was kidnapped with others from her tourist group by Islamic militants. She escaped, and her kidnappers were later arrested.
1 January 1998		Ben Smart	Scott Watson	Marlborough Sounds, New Zealand	21	Murdered	Smart and Hope were last seen boarding a private vessel with a stranger who offered them a place to sleep for the night after a New Year's Eve party. They are believed to have been murdered by this man who then threw their bodies over the side. Scott Watson was convicted of the murders in September 1999.
1 January 1998		Olivia Hope	Scott Watson	Marlborough Sounds, New Zealand	17	Murdered	Smart and Hope were last seen boarding a private vessel with a stranger who offered them a place to sleep for the night after a New Year's Eve party. They are believed to have been murdered by this man who then threw their bodies over the side. Scott Watson was convicted of the murders in September 1999.
7 January 1998		Brittany Lynn Locklear	Unknown	(United States) Bowmore, North Carolina, U.S.	5	Murdered	Brittany was abducted while waiting for the school bus in the predawn hours. After an extensive search, her naked body was found in a drainage ditch approximately three miles from her home. She had been sexually assaulted and then drowned (police believe in the ditch). To this day her case remains unsolved.
22 January 1998		Jennifer Long	Wesley Ira Purkey	(United States) Kansas City, Missouri, U.S.	16	Murdered	Purkey lured Long into his vehicle by offering to drive her to a liquor store before driving her back to his home in Lansing, where he raped her, stabbed her to death, dismembered her with a chainsaw, burnt and pulverised her remains and disposed of the ashes in a septic pond.
March 1998		Gabriella Torres	Fidel Urbina	(United States) Chicago, Illinois, U.S.	22	Murdered	Gabriella Torres was an American waitress who was abducted by Fidel Urbina in Chicago and later found dead in the trunk of a car in an alley.
2 March 1998		Natascha Kampusch	Wolfgang Přiklopil	Vienna, Austria	10	Escaped	Kampusch was abducted on her way to school and held in a secret cellar by her kidnapper for more than eight years. She escaped aged 18 on 23 August 2006. Přiklopil knew the police were after him, so he killed himself by jumping in front of a train.
7 June 1998		James Byrd Jr.	Shawn Berry, Lawrence Brewer, John King	(United States) Jasper, Texas, U.S.	49	Murdered	Byrd, an African-American man, was tricked into accepting a ride home by three white supremacists who drove him to a remote country road, beat him severely and tied him behind their truck before dragging him for around three miles. Around halfway through the dragging, Byrd was decapitated from being dragged over a culvert. Two perpetrators became the first white men sentenced to death by the state of Texas for killing an African-American.
10 July 1998		Kamiyah Mobley	Gloria Williams	(United States) Jacksonville, Florida, U.S.	Less than one day	Raised by abductor	Mobley was abducted from the hospital at eight hours old. She was reunited with her birth parents in January 2017 following DNA testing.
27 July 1998		Allyson Dalton	Unknown	(United States) Strasburg, Virginia, U.S.	10 weeks	Unknown	Allyson Dalton is the daughter of Sylena Dalton, 20, who was found stabbed to death in the apartment they shared with Sylena's mother. A friend alerted to the scene found Sylena stabbed to death and Allyson missing. A witness said he saw a male putting a baby into a truck. Suspicion was on the father, Daniel Pompell. There had been disagreements over custody and support. The day Sylena was murdered, a paternity hearing was scheduled. Police have never named a suspect or a person of interest. In 2000, Sylena's mother filed a wrongful death suit against Pompell, but it was dropped for lack of evidence. Sylena's mother's search for Allyson has never stopped.
29 July 1998		Julie Ann Holmquist	Curtiss Cedargren	(United States) Hallock, Minnesota, U.S.	16	Murdered	Holmquist was kidnapped while inline skating. On 20 Aug, a hunter found her badly decomposed body in a gravel pit near Lancaster. Four years later, suspect Curtiss Cedergren, 38, shot and killed himself as an investigator arrived at his Lancaster, Minn., home to arrange for a lie detector test. Authorities later detailed evidence they had collected and said with confidence that Cedergren was responsible for Holmquist's death.
30 July 1998		Felicia Ann Elliott	Charles (Chad) Wayne Green and Billy Dale Green	(United States) Randolph County, Arkansas, U.S.	8	Murdered	Chad Green and his father Billy Dale Green killed Felicia Elliott's family in a home invasion, after which Felicia was kidnapped, bound with duct tape and held in a barrel by her captors, and raped by Chad Green. Billy Green then slit her throat, and her remains were found in a creek bed over 2 years later. The Greens were arrested in July 2003 and charged with the murders and Felicia's abduction, and after the initial verdict was overturned, the father and son were retried and again convicted, being sentenced to multiple life terms. The motive for the murders was unclear as the Greens were known methamphetamine and other drug dealers, but there was also a question of whether Chad, a known sex offender, had targeted Felicia well before the home invasion. The case was detailed in true crime author George Jared's book, The Creek Side Bones.
September 1998		Liu Hua	Fa Ziying and Lao Rongzhi	Changzhou, Jiangsu, China	Unknown	Released	Auto shop owner kidnapped for ransom by Chinese serial killers Fa Ziying and Lao Rongzhi. Hua and later his wife were robbed and bound by the pair, with Hua receiving a non-fatal stab wound to the chest. Although the pair had initially planned to kill the couple, both were abandoned by their captors, and eventually freed by neighbors.
6 October 1998		Matthew Shepard	Aaron McKinney, Russell Henderson	(United States) Laramie, Wyoming, U.S.	21	Murdered	Shepard, a gay man, was picked up at a bar named the Fireside Lounge by Aaron McKinney and Russell Henderson, who, after discovering that Shepard was gay, drove him to a remote rural area where they robbed and pistol-whipped him before tying him to a split rail fence and leaving him to die. Shepard was discovered in a coma eighteen hours after the attack and was pronounced clinically dead six days later.
11 December 1998		Sion Jenkins	Allan Grimson	Portsmouth, England	20	Murdered	Jenkins was a Royal Navy sailor who went to a nightclub in Portsmouth with fellow sailor Allan Grimson, not knowing he was in fact a serial killer. A straight man, Grimson took the drunk Jenkins back to his flat and raped him under threat. In the morning Jenkins expressed his desire to leave but Grimson tied him up and beat him to death. As of 2019, Grimson was due to be released from prison.

== 1999 ==
Date	Victim(s)	Abductor(s)	Location	Age of victim(s)	Outcome	Notes
c. 1999	Heidy Forero	María Concepción Ladino	Bucaramanga, Colombia	Unknown	Murdered	A victim of serial killer and fraudster María Concepción Ladino. Forero was drugged, then burned alive in her car.
1999	Bardhyl Çaushi	Yugoslav militants	Serbia	62-63	Murdered	A Kosovo Albanian human rights lawyer and activist. Çaushi was abducted by Yugoslav forces and held in prisons in Serbia. Çaushi's fate was unknown until 2005, when his remains were found and identified.
19 January 1999	Lisa Hoodless	Alan Hopkinson	Hastings, England	10	Rescued	Hoodless and Lunnon were forced into Hopkinson's car on their way to school. He held them in his flat for three days where he sexually abused them. They were rescued when police visited Hopkinson's flat. Hopkinson was given a life sentence on 28 May 1999.
19 January 1999	Charlene Lunnon	Alan Hopkinson	Hastings, England	10	Rescued	Hoodless and Lunnon were forced into Hopkinson's car on their way to school. He held them in his flat for three days where he sexually abused them. They were rescued when police visited Hopkinson's flat. Hopkinson was given a life sentence on 28 May 1999.
27 January 1999	Shemeka Denise Ray	Unknown	(United States) Columbus, Georgia, US	11	Murdered	Shemeka Ray was kidnapped from her home in Cusseta, Georgia and found the following day in a ravine off Route 268, near the Interstate 85 freeway in Columbus. She died of blunt force trauma to the head. Her case remains unsolved.
17 March 1999	Fan Man-yee	Chan Man-lok, Leung Wai-lun, Leung Shing-cho	Kwai Chung, Hong Kong	23	Murdered	Fan Man-yee, a nightclub hostess, was abducted in Lai Yiu Estate before being raped and tortured to death in an apartment in Tsim Sha Tsui, Kowloon.
20 March 1999	Cynthia Vigil	David Parker Ray, Cindy Hendy	(United States) Albuquerque, New Mexico, U.S.	22	Escaped	Cynthia Vigil was kidnapped from a parking lot by David Parker Ray and his accomplice Cindy Hendy, who raped and tortured her over the course of the next two days while keeping her chained to the wall. On 22 March, Vigil managed to free herself and stabbed Hendy before escaping. Her escape led to the arrest of Ray, now thought to be a prolific serial killer, and several accomplices who included Hendy.
12 April 1999	Leszli Kálli	Guerrillas	Colombia	18	Released	Kálli was abducted after the plane she was on was hijacked. She was held for slightly more than a year by Colombian leftist guerrillas with her father and almost 3 dozen other passengers. She published a novel about her experiences. While some passengers were released quickly, many hostages were released only when their specific ransom was paid. The last hostage, Gloria Amaya de Alfonso, was not released until 22 November 2000, 19 months after the hijacking.
3 May 1999	Hans van de Kimmenade	Four unknown men	Helmond, Netherlands	18	Released	A group of at least four armed (allegedly Arabian) men kidnapped van de Kimmenade, son of wealthy industrialists, from his estate. After the case received much media attention, Van de Kimmenade was dropped off at a waterschap within 48 hours. No reason was given for his release. After months of research, the case appeared unsolvable.
15 May 1999	Andria Nichole Brewer	Karl Roberts	(United States) Mena, Arkansas, U.S.	12	Murdered	Roberts, 35, was convicted in May 2000 by a Polk County Circuit Court jury of capital murder in the rape and strangling of Brewer, his niece, and sentenced to death.
21 June 1999	Todd Bagley	Brandon Bernard, Christopher Vialva, Terry Brown, Christopher Lewis, Tony Sparks	(United States) Fort Hood, Texas, U.S.	26	Murdered	The Bagleys, two youth pastors, were carjacked at gunpoint by five teenagers who forced them into the trunk of their car and drove around for several hours while withdrawing money via the couple's ATM card. The car eventually pulled over to the side of the road, where the gang poured lighter fluid over the Bagleys before Christopher Vialva shot them in the head and Brandon Bernard set the car on fire. Bernard and Vialva were executed for their role in the murders in 2020.
21 June 1999	Stacie Bagley	Brandon Bernard, Christopher Vialva, Terry Brown, Christopher Lewis, Tony Sparks	(United States) Fort Hood, Texas, U.S.	28	Murdered	The Bagleys, two youth pastors, were carjacked at gunpoint by five teenagers who forced them into the trunk of their car and drove around for several hours while withdrawing money via the couple's ATM card. The car eventually pulled over to the side of the road, where the gang poured lighter fluid over the Bagleys before Christopher Vialva shot them in the head and Brandon Bernard set the car on fire. Bernard and Vialva were executed for their role in the murders in 2020.
7 July 1999	Rolando "Rolandito" Salas Jusino	Unknown	Toa Alta, Puerto Rico	4	Unknown	Salas Jusino was playing, allegedly unsupervised, in a community park next to his house's backyard. He was never found.
10 August 1999	Katelyn Rivera-Helton	Robert Rivera	(United States) Boothwyn, Pennsylvania, U.S.	20 months	Murdered	Katelyn Rivera-Helton was the infant daughter of Robert Rivera, who was barred by court order from contacting her outside one-hour supervised visits due to domestic abuse against her mother Jennifer Helton. After being charged with assaulting Helton, Rivera drove to the home of Katelyn's babysitter, broke down the door, and carried her away. After driving around with her for several hours, Rivera took Katelyn up to Elkton, Maryland, where he strangled her and buried her body in an unmarked grave. Katelyn's body has never been found.
9 September 1999	Unnamed 14 year old girl	Vincent Lee Chuan Leong, Shi Song Jing and Zhou Jian Guang.	Bukit Timah, Singapore	14	Released	Lee, Zhou and Shi abducted a 14-year-old girl who was walking home on the night of 9 September 1999 at Bukit Timah. The girl, who was blindfolded, was held hostage for sixty hours at a rented flat and released after her father paid a ransom of S$330,000. The kidnappers were arrested shortly after, and sentenced to life imprisonment. As of 2020, Lee was confirmed to be released from Changi Prison on parole after serving 20 years and ten months of his term with good behaviour.
12 October 1999	Pamela Butler	Keith Dwayne Nelson	(United States) Kansas City, U.S.	10	Murdered	Butler was rollerblading in front of her house when Nelson kidnapped her. He took her from Kansas into Grain Valley, Missouri, to a church. There he took her to a wooded area, where he raped and strangled her with speaker wire. Nelson was arrested two days later near the Kansas River, and Butler's body was recovered the following day. Nelson was found guilty and sentenced to death by lethal injection in a federal facility. He was executed for the crime on August 28, 2020, at USP Terre Haute.
