= Sion Jenkins =

Sion Jenkins may refer to:

- Sion Jenkins (died 1998), murder victim of Allan Grimson
- Siôn Jenkins, foster father, acquitted of the 1997 murder of Billie-Jo Jenkins
