= Yanis Baltass =

Greek serial killer

Yanis Baltas
- Born: 1970 (age 55–56); Lofiskos, Thessaloniki, Greece
- Conviction: Murder x4
- Penalty: Life imprisonment x4

Details
- Victims: 4+
- Span of crimes: 1995–2004
- Country: Greece
- States: Kilkis, Thessaloniki
- Date apprehended: 6 May 2004

Yanis Baltass (Greek: Ιωάννης Μπαλτάς; born 1970) is a Greek serial killer who killed at least four people in Kilkis and Thessaloniki from 1995 to 2004 with the help of two accomplices, primarily targeting foreign labourers. For his crimes, he was convicted and sentenced to life imprisonment.

== Early life ==
Yanis Baltass was born in the rural village of Lofiskos in 1970, as the eldest of three brothers. While his parents were well-respected and considered an honest couple, Baltass' troubles began early on in childhood, with many in his native village considering him a troublemaker who should be avoided. As he grew older, he and fellow villager Dimitris Savvelidis would go out at night and spend most of their time either drinking or digging for antique items such as statues, marbles and old coins. Despite his troublesome character, he was tolerated by the locals due to his diligent work ethic and willingness to take on various jobs whenever somebody needed help.

Eventually, he bought a huge flock of sheep and a large plot of land, and felt the need to hire some farmhands to help with the work, as he could not do it alone. However, in order to cut costs, he would often resort to hiring foreigners from neighbouring countries so he could knowingly pay them less money or simply would hold back on paying for months on end. When some of these workers began demanding that he pay them their due share, Baltass, with the aid of his younger brother Stavros and his friend Savvelidis, began devising schemes to get rid of them permanently.

== Murders ==
Sometime in late 1995, Baltass was contacted by an Albanian shepherd he had previously employed and was asked to pay for the man's work, which he initially refused. Embittered by the denial, the man contacted two compatriots from nearby villages to pressure Baltass into paying him. Eventually, the shepherd was contacted again and notified by his former employer that he would not only be paid, but that Baltass himself would transport the two men across the country.

On 20 December 1995, Baltass picked up 20-year-old Petrisi Losi and 25-year-old Paugin Legisi in his car, promising that he would safely transport them over the border so they could visit their family members for the holidays. Unbeknownst to them, Stavros Baltass and Dimitris Savvelidis were trailing behind them in another car, and eventually stopped them on a deserted road near the village of Petroto in Kilkis. Pretending to be police officers, they ordered the men to get out of the car, whereupon they robbed them of 800,000 drachmas. Shortly afterwards, Baltass drew a gun he had kept on him and shot both Losi and Legisi, killing them. The trio then transported their bodies to an old tunnel near Vaiochori, where Baltass painted their fingernails in an attempt to mislead police into believing they were women who had fallen victims to human traffickers. The victims' bodies were found two months later, with an autopsy confirming that they were the missing men who had been declared missing by family members back in Albania. As he was the last person seen in their company, Baltass was called in and questioned, with him claiming that he had simply taken them across the border and left them afterwards, unaware of what had happened next. As the authorities lacked evidence to arrest him, he was released. For the following few years, his involvement in this case was quickly forgotten by everybody except the Albanians working in the area, who persisted in the rumours that he was somehow involved.

In May 1996, Baltass hired 20-year-old Eduard Haka, an Albanian national, to work as a shepherd on his farm in Lofiskos. After working with him for three days, he grew dissatisfied with the quality of his work because he apparently "did not milk his goats well" and decided to get rid of him. To do this, he lured Haka to one of his sheep pens and shot him with a shotgun. He then dug a grave near the pen and buried his body there, where it remained undiscovered until his eventual arrest.

In the following years, Baltass met and courted Theodora Kirkinezi, who would later become his fiancée. However, this never came to fruition, as Kirkinezi eventually called off the marriage and left him, citing his constant physical abuse towards her. On 3 May 2004, Kirkinezi called Baltass and informed him that she was coming to visit him in Lagkadas, accompanied by her two brothers. Upon hearing this, Baltass prepared his shotgun, saying that he planned to kill the "two dogs" after they arrived, even going so far as to prepare a grenade launcher aimed at the highway leading into the town. When they arrived, he got into a confrontation with Kirkinezi's brothers, and in the ensuing argument, Baltass grabbed the shotgun and fired at both men, killing 29-year-old Dimitris and injuring the other brother, Savvas. Afterwards, he kidnapped Theodora and fled to the nearby mountains.

== Arrest, trial and imprisonment ==
Immediately following the shooting, the entire municipal police force was put on high alert, with arrangements to blockade the entire province as to prevent Baltass from fleeing. For the next two days, they scoured the forests around Lofiskos and Vertiskos to search for the fugitive, even using a thermal camera that traced the location of his mobile phone, even when it was turned off. This did not help them much, however, as Baltass knew the region well and was constantly on the move, allowing him to avoid getting caught. While on the run, the pair survived by drinking water from rivers and eating lettuce, and in order to prevent her from escaping, Baltass constantly held Kirkinezi's hand, even while she was asleep. On the third day, Baltass unexpectedly released his hostage and was subsequently apprehended hours later by police officers in Lofiskos. At the time of his arrest, Baltass supposedly cried in front of the officers because he found it difficult to leave the woman he loved, whom he would be unable to see when he went behind bars.

A short time after being brought to the police station, he suddenly confessed to the previous murders, additionally implicating his brother and Savvelidis as accomplices. During his confessions, Baltass gave intricate details and showed no remorse for what he had done, resorting to making justifications for his actions. Suspecting that he might be responsible for further crimes, the Thessaloniki Municipal Police started re-investigating all cold cases and disappearances involving foreigners in the area. As a result, they proposed Baltass as a suspect in the disappearances of two Bulgarian women, a Russian woman and an unidentified woman, but did not charge him due to lack of evidence. While awaiting trial for the murders, Baltass was kept under very strict security measures, as prison staff feared that he would be maimed or outright killed if confronted by other inmates.

In early 2005, Baltass was brought to trial for the four murders, as well as the kidnapping of Theodora Kirkinezi. He freely admitted his crimes while testifying, and appeared to smile cynically when his murders were described in detail by the prosecutors. Because of this, one of the witnesses at his trial, a police officer, described him as a "tough person, without feelings for the value of human life". On 24 February, Baltass was found guilty on all counts and given four life terms without parole. His two accomplices, Dimitris Savvelidis and Stavros Baltass, were also convicted in regard to their participation in the Losi-Legisi murders, with the former receiving two life terms and 9 years imprisonment. The court, taking into account Stavros' young age at the time of the crimes, gave him a lesser sentence of 20 years imprisonment.

On 22 May 2007, Baltass appealed his sentence before the Court of Appeals at a second trial. After just a day of deliberations, he was again found guilty and the previous court's finding upheld. As of April 2022, he is still incarcerated at an undisclosed prison.

== See also ==
- List of kidnappings (1990–1999)
- List of serial killers by country
