= Killing of Melanie Carpenter =

1995 murder in British Columbia, Canada

Melanie Carpenter
- Born: April 22, 1971; British Columbia, Canada
- Died: January 6, 1995 (aged 23); British Columbia, Canada
- Body discovered: January 26, 1995
- Known for: being kidnapped and murdered
- Parents: Steve Carpenter (father); Sandra Carpenter (mother)

Melanie Carpenter (April 22, 1971 – January 6, 1995) was a Canadian 23-year-old woman who was abducted and murdered in British Columbia, on January 6, 1995. Carpenter was taken from her workplace in Surrey and found dead in the Fraser Canyon several weeks later. The prime suspect, Fernand Auger, committed suicide before he could be arrested.

== Disappearance ==
On January 6, 1995, Melanie Carpenter, a 23-year-old woman from Surrey, British Columbia, had received suspicious phone calls from a man feigning interest in a business deal. Later that day, Carpenter was abducted, presumably by the caller, from where she was working alone at a tanning salon in the Fleetwood town centre of Surrey.

== Investigation ==
The afternoon that Carpenter went missing, a bank security camera recorded a 37-year-old man, Fernand Auger, making a $300 withdrawal using Carpenter's debit card, and the footage was shown on national TV the next day. Auger was a drifter from Ontario, frequently working as a waiter in restaurants, and had been a resident of Calgary, Alberta, until moving to British Columbia days before the murder. In August 1994, Auger had been released from prison in Bowden, Alberta, where he had served a 16-month sentence for armed robbery, and was on parole at the time. Auger quickly became the number one suspect in the abduction, and a warrant was issued for his arrest.

On January 15, 1995, Auger was found dead at a vacant home in High River, Alberta, 55 kilometers (34 mi) south of Calgary, by a real estate agent during a viewing with a client. Auger had committed suicide in a garage on the property by inhaling carbon monoxide fumes from the engine of his car, a Hyundai Excel rented from Calgary.

Carpenter's corpse was found by hikers shortly afterwards along an isolated road in a First Nations reserve near Hope, a rural town in Fraser Canyon, British Columbia, 45 kilometers (28 mi) northeast of Chilliwack. Carpenter's body had been abandoned in a crevice and concealed by a white blanket.

== Aftermath ==
In 1995, the Melanie Carpenter Foundation was established to create a memorial for Carpenter. After her death, Carpenter's father formed a petition to keep murderers in prison.

== See also ==
- List of kidnappings (1990–1999)
- List of solved missing person cases (1990s)
- List of unsolved murders (1980–1999)
