= Murder of Andria Brewer =

1999 murder and rape of a young girl in Arkansas

- Andria Brewer, Murder Victim
- Location: Mena, Arkansas, United States
- Date: May 15, 1999
- Attack type: Kidnapping, rape and murder
- Verdict: Guilty
- Convictions: Capital murder
- Sentence: Death (May 23, 2000)
- Convicted: Karl Douglas Roberts

The murder of Andria Brewer (April 10, 1987 – May 15, 1999) occurred on May 15, 1999, in Mena, Arkansas. Brewer, then 12 years old, was kidnapped by her uncle, Karl Douglas Roberts (born March 6, 1968), who subsequently raped and murdered her in the nearby woods. Roberts was later arrested, charged and found guilty of capital murder, and sentenced to death in May 2000. Roberts is currently on death row awaiting execution at the Varner Unit.

== Murder ==
12-year-old Andria Nichole Brewer was last seen leaving her house in a small red pickup truck on May 15, 1999 in Mena, Arkansas. Although Brewer was initially believed to have run away from home, one or two days later the police decided to seek the assistance of the FBI and Arkansas State Police to investigate Brewer's disappearance. The authorities first looked through the individuals related or known to the family, specifically those who owned a red pickup truck. Only two men, Bobby Stone and Karl Douglas Roberts, the latter being the girl's uncle, fit the description.

On May 17, 1999, the State Police conducted a polygraph test on both men. After the test was carried out, Roberts was detained by the police after the results showed he was being deceptive. During police questioning, Roberts confessed that Brewer was dead and he was responsible. In a written confession signed by Arkansas State Police Corporal Ocie Rateliff, Roberts admitted that he took his niece into his truck and drove to a secluded area, where he raped, strangled, and hid her body.

The body of Brewer was eventually discovered in a wooded area near Mena, after Roberts led the police investigators to where he left her corpse. After his arrest, Roberts was charged with the rape and murder of his niece.

== Trial and 2004 execution attempt ==
Within a year after killing Andria Brewer, Roberts stood trial for the murder of his niece. During his trial before a Polk County jury, Roberts attempted to show he suffered from diminished responsibility at the time of the murder. Two medical experts for the defense, Lee Archer, a neurologist, and Mary Wetherby, a neuropsychologist, both testified that due to a head injury which Roberts suffered at age 12, Roberts had impulse and behavioral control problems and it had a substantial influence of his conduct at the time of the crime.

However, in rebuttal, the prosecution called upon two experts, Reginald Rutherford, a clinical neurologist, and Charles Mallory, a psychologist, who both testified that despite his IQ of 76, Roberts did not have any impairments of social and behavioural functioning, since he could complete high school, get married with two children and hold a construction job for six years, and he also took active steps to plan, premeditate, execute and cover up the murder. In the end, the jury found Roberts guilty and convicted him of capital murder, an offence that warranted either life imprisonment without the possibility of parole or the death penalty under Arkansas state law.

On May 23, 2000, Roberts was sentenced to death upon the jury's unanimous recommendation for capital punishment, and a day later, after his sentencing, Roberts was transferred to death row under the custody of the Arkansas Department of Corrections.

On April 11, 2003, the Arkansas Supreme Court dismissed Karl Roberts's direct appeal against his death sentence.

On October 9, 2003, the Arkansas Supreme Court reviewed the case of Roberts and agreed with a circuit judge's assessment that Roberts was mentally competent to waive his appeals and be executed, after Roberts stated he would not want to continue pursue any further appeals against his death sentence.

On November 8, 2003, Arkansas Governor Mike Huckabee signed two death warrants for both Roberts and another convicted killer Charles Laverne Singleton (who was then the state's longest-serving death row prisoner), scheduling them to be executed on the same date of January 6, 2004. In response to the scheduled execution, Andria Brewer's mother Rebecca Petty expressed her intention to witness the execution of her daughter's murderer.

On January 6, 2004, hours before he was to be executed, Roberts filed an appeal for a stay of execution. U.S. District Judge George Howard Jr. granted the motion of Roberts and stayed his execution. In response, the Arkansas state prosecutors filed an appeal to overturn the stay order, but the 8th U.S. Circuit Court of Appeals denied the prosecution's appeal. Ultimately, the U.S. Supreme Court affirmed the order to stay Roberts's execution, and as a result of the ruling, Roberts remained on death row while Singleton himself was alone executed as scheduled in the Cummins Unit.

== Further appeals ==
In December 2004, Roberts filed a federal motion to challenge the constitutionality of the lethal injection protocols in Arkansas.

On July 18, 2005, Roberts appealed to the 8th U.S. Circuit Court of Appeals, seeking to dismiss the prosecution's appeal against the district court's order to stay his execution. The appeal was granted.

In 2008, the case of Roberts was remanded back to the state courts by a federal district judge, who ruled that Roberts should first exhaust his appellate revenues in state court before bringing his case forward to the federal courts. On December 1, 2011, the Arkansas Supreme Court dismissed the appeal of Roberts, stating that he improperly followed the required guidelines to reopen his case for post-conviction proceedings in state court.

On February 1, 2013, Roberts appealed for a new sentencing hearing, claiming that his original death sentence was unjust due to the jury being unduly influenced by statements from the victim's family. On February 14, 2013, the Arkansas Supreme Court granted Roberts's application to reopen his case for further appellate proceedings. A fresh appeal was then submitted to the Polk County Circuit Court in July 2013. However, two months later, in September 2013, Roberts once again expressed his intention to waive his appeals and be executed.

On December 31, 2014, Polk County Circuit Judge J.W. Looney found that Roberts was mentally competent to waive his remaining appeals and hence approved his motion to forgo his appeals. In midst of the hearing in this appeal, Andria Brewer's father attempted to attack Roberts in the courtroom but he was stopped by the police and therefore arrested on charges of attempting to attack Roberts.

However, the defence appealed against the circuit judge's decision, stating that the psychiatric condition of Roberts influenced his decision to not proceed with additional appeals against his death sentence. On March 17, 2016, the Arkansas Supreme Court overturned the lower court's verdict via a 4–3 majority decision, finding that Roberts was not mentally competent to drop his remaining rights to appeal and thus paved away for potential further appeals against his death sentence.

On January 9, 2020, Roberts appealed that his death sentence should not be carried out on the grounds that he was diagnosed with schizophrenia, and hence mentally incompetent to be executed. On January 30, 2020, by a majority decision of 6–1, the Arkansas Supreme Court rejected Roberts's appeal and dismissed his claims of mental illness that hindered his competency to be executed.

On August 19, 2024, the 8th U.S. Circuit Court of Appeals dismissed Roberts's appeal.

In October 2025, the U.S. Supreme Court denied Roberts's final appeal against his death sentence. According to a spokesperson for the Arkansas Attorney-General's Office, Roberts was now eligible to have an execution date set for his case, although it was not confirmed when his execution could be scheduled and conducted. Till today, the most recent execution in Arkansas was serial killer Kenneth Williams, who was put to death at the Cummins Unit on April 27, 2017.

== Current status ==
2021 Mugshot of Karl Douglas Roberts

As of 2025, Karl Roberts remains on death row at the Varner Unit. His execution date is yet to be scheduled.

== Aftermath ==
In January 2013, 14 years after the death of Andria Brewer, her mother Rebecca Petty became a crime victim's advocate. A year later, Petty first entered politics by running for the state House District 94 seat, with hopes of advocating for the safety of children from criminals, and strengthen measures to incarcerate criminals for better protection of society.

In December 2014, Petty proposed a bill to enact a new law to allow the families of murder victims to witness the executions of the murderer(s). In February 2015, the Arkansas House legislature agreed to pass the bill by a unanimous vote of 95–0, and Arkansas governor Asa Hutchinson ultimately signed the bill into law, and the measure became known as "Andi's Law".

In 2017, when the state of Arkansas attempted to end the 12-year moratorium and resume executions by scheduling the execution dates of eight convicted murderers within a ten-day period, Petty supported the state's decision and said that from the perspective of the victims' families, they would finally receive the justice they waited for after years since the sentencing of the killers, alluding to her years of awaiting the execution of Roberts, who was not listed among the eight prisoners scheduled for execution. In the end, four of the inmates (Ledell Lee, Jack Harold Jones, Marcel Williams and Kenneth Williams) were ultimately executed between April 20 and April 27, 2017, while for the remaining four, three of them – Don Williams Davis, Bruce Earl Ward, and Stacey Eugene Johnson – had their executions stayed, while the fourth, Jason McGehee, was granted clemency and had his death sentence commuted to life in prison without the possibility of parole.

== See also ==
- Capital punishment in Arkansas
- List of death row inmates in the United States § Arkansas
- List of kidnappings (1990–1999)
