= Disappearance of Simon Parkes =

Disappearance of a Royal Navy seaman

Simon Parkes
- Born: 1968; Kingswood, Gloucestershire, England
- Disappeared: 12 December 1986 (aged 18)
- Status: Missing for 39 years, 3 months and 18 days
- Occupations: radio operator (RO1 (G), Royal Navy

Simon Parkes (born 1968) was a radio operator (RO1 (G)) in the Royal Navy who went missing in Gibraltar in 1986. Parkes was serving aboard HMS Illustrious when he disappeared whilst on shore leave in the overseas territory. In 2001, Parkes' disappearance gained renewed interest when it was noted that convicted murderer Allan Grimson also worked on Illustrious at the same time.

== Disappearance ==
Parkes was a radio operator in the Royal Navy and was serving aboard the light aircraft carrier, HMS Illustrious. In December 1986, Illustrious berthed in Gibraltar allowing the crew to get some shore leave in. This was the last leg of the ship's world tour, Global 86, before she sailed for her home port of Portsmouth. Parkes had gone ashore with his shipmates on the 12 December and was last seen at the Horseshoe Bar after telling friends that he was going to get something to eat. Someone fitting his description was seen at the Hole in the Wall pub, part of the Fleet Pavilion (which was hosting a Naval function). The witnesses also state that the person appeared to be drunk. Parkes' disappearance prompted a search of the areas he was last known to be in. This amounted to a 250-man physical search of the area.

== Theories ==
Deliberate disappearance or AWOL (absent without leave) were originally suspected, with authorities pressing their emphasis on looking for a person, not a body. Parkes had left his passport, all his possessions, and Christmas presents behind on the ship, and his family later said he had written a letter telling them that he would be home for Christmas. Shipmates later confirmed that Parkes was looking forward to going home for Christmas and that he had also arranged for special dockside passes so that his family could greet him when the ship arrived back in the United Kingdom.

== Subsequent events ==
In 2001, Petty Officer Allan Grimson was convicted of killing two young men. Both had been in the Royal Navy and been killed on the 12 December of each year (1997 and 1998). As Parkes had disappeared on the 12 December 1986, and Grimson was serving aboard Illustrious at that time, parallels were drawn between Parkes' disappearance and the murders. In 2003, Hampshire Police flew out to Gibraltar and arranged for new searches to take place which involved cadaver dogs and digging in three areas; around the South Barracks, around Rosia Lane (where the Naval function was held in 1986) and Trafalgar Cemetery. The searches were unsuccessful.

In July 2005, the BBC broadcast a programme called Body Hunt; the Search for Simon Parkes. This prompted someone to call in and give certain details which the police described as "vital information". In October of the same year, Parkes' disappearance was given a slot on Crimewatch. Through his solicitor, Grimson appealed to Ofcom about both programmes citing a number of complaints such as not being given enough time to respond to issues in the programme, the lack of other suspects and the fact that he had denied any connection to Parkes' disappearance.

In December 2019, Hampshire Police stated that they had received information that Parkes' body could be buried in Trafalgar Cemetery in Gibraltar. A new search was conducted, even after unsuccessful attempts to find his body after a search in 2003.

In December 2025 the police have ended their investigation unless new evidence emerges in the future.

== See also ==
- List of people who disappeared mysteriously: post-1970
