= Mohammed Abequa =

Jordanian murderer

- Born: Jordan
- Conviction: Murder
- Criminal charges: Murder of Nihal Gussal Abequa
- Penalty: 15 years

Details
- Locations: Parsippany, New Jersey, United States

Mohammed Abequa is a Jordanian citizen and naturalized American citizen who murdered his estranged wife in July 1994 in Parsippany, New Jersey, kidnapped their two children, and fled to his country of origin. Abequa became the subject of an international manhunt when the murder was discovered. He avoided the efforts of government prosecutor Michael Murphy to extradite and try him due to the lack of an extradition treaty between Jordan and the United States.

== Murder ==
Nihal Gussal Abequa was murdered by her husband after the couple had separated and she had filed for divorce. Her body was discovered when her sister, who had not heard from her, went to the apartment and, not finding her, called the police. Abequa fled soon after the murder, taking the couple's six year-old daughter Lisa and three year-old son Sami with him. The murderer and the couple's children became the subjects of an international manhunt.

=== Victim ===
Nihal Gussal, known as Nina to her friends, immigrated with her family to the United States from Turkey as a young child. She was a naturalized citizen and served for four years in the United States Army. She worked as an insurance claims adjuster and had an additional, early morning job delivering newspapers to make ends meet. The couple were married in 1986 and had two children. Gussal filed for divorce stating that Abequa had hit and choked her, had broken the telephone to prevent her from calling the police, had repeatedly beaten the children with a belt and that he had threatened to kidnap the children and take them to live in Jordan.

=== Perpetrator ===
Perpetrator, who had served as a mechanic in the Royal Jordanian Army, was a naturalized United States citizen.

=== Efforts at extradition ===
According to The New York Times, "the victim's family and high-ranking American officials, including President Clinton, had used every available diplomatic channel to persuade Jordan to extradite him to the United States" to stand trial. Jordan and the United States did not have an extradition treaty in the 1990s.

== Jordanian trial, conviction, and release ==
Jordanian prosecutor, Khalid Darwish, traveled to New Jersey to gather evidence. Abequa was tried, convicted and sentenced in July 1995 to 15 years in prison for murder. However, he was given a "palace pardon" and released from prison in November 2000.

== Custody of children ==
Senator Frank Lautenberg blocked foreign aid to Jordan until the Jordanian government agreed to permit the Abequa children to return to the United States to live with their mother's sister, Nesime Dokur, in New Jersey.

== American indictment ==
The original Morris County indictment for killing his wife on either 3 or 4 July 1994, then kidnapping their two children and absconding to Jordan, was still active and actionable in 2017.

== Context ==
The case was one of several hundred of cases of international child abduction investigated by the United States Department of State every year in which an American child is kidnapped and taken out of the country by a parent or family member.

== See also ==
- International child abduction in the United States
