= Arohn Kee =

American serial killer (born 1973)

- Born: September 18, 1973 (age 53); Manhattan, New York, U.S.
- Other names: The East-Harlem Rapist; Arohn Malik; Arohn Worford; Arohn Warford
- Convictions: First degree murder Second degree murder (2 counts); First degree rape (2 counts); First degree robbery
- Penalty: Life imprisonment without parole

Details
- Victims: 3+
- Span of crimes: 1991–1998
- Country: United States
- State: New York
- Date apprehended: February 19, 1999
- Imprisoned at: Attica Correctional Facility

Arohn Kee (born September 18, 1973), known as The East-Harlem Rapist, is an American serial killer and serial rapist who was responsible for four rapes and at least three murders of teenaged girls in different street blocks of East Harlem, located in Manhattan, New York City from 1991 to 1998.

== Early life ==
Kee was born in New York City and spent his whole life in East Harlem. He had been arrested for robbery in 1990 without conviction, but was locally known as a "peeping tom", who would hide in stairwells to take upskirt photos and videos of passing women.

== Murders and rapes ==
On January 24, 1991, Kee, then 17, killed 13-year-old schoolgirl Paola Illera. She was abducted by Kee at her apartment complex, just after Illera had rung her doorbell for her mother to open the front door. Illera's body was discovered three hours later at a promenade of the East River, ten blocks away from her home. She had been raped and strangled before being killed with three stab wounds to the chest. Police found a single pubic hair near Illera's body, while witnesses described a male figure entering the elevator of Illera's apartment building with her shortly before her disappearance. Kee, then known as Arohn Warford, his mother's last name, was identified as the individual in question, but police let him go after he claimed to have exited the elevator while Illera was still inside.

In 1994, a rape committed against a 15-year-old girl was linked to Kee from the victim's description. Kee had taken the victim at knifepoint from behind and forced her to a secluded alley, where she was blindfolded and forced to strip down before the rape. The victim was able to describe the rapist as a muscular, clean-shaven black male, also noting that the assailant told her that she was "lucky to be raped by such a handsome man".

On September 13, 1997, Kee attacked 19-year-old Johalis Castro, originally from the Dominican Republic, in the basement of her apartment building, the George Washington Houses. He raped and smothered her, then burned her body while she was still breathing, possibly to prevent recognition. Her body was discovered by a responding fire crew. Kee was questioned by police, since several phone calls by Castro led to his number. Kee explained that his girlfriend was friends with Castro and that the trio had planned to go shopping the day of their murder. After Kee's girlfriend confirmed the story, Kee was let go despite not providing an alibi.

In April 1998, Kee raped a 13-year-old girl. Like the victim in the 1994 case, the girl said that the rapist kept repeating the same self-compliments, as well as that she should "be quiet and take it like a woman".

On June 2, 1998, Kee raped and murdered 18-year-old Rasheeda Washington, who lived in the same apartment complex as Paola Illera.

Following two more rapes against a 15-year-old and 14-year-old on September 25 and November 16, 1998, police began actively searching for a serial offender after residents of East Harlem filed complaints about the apparently connected crimes. A connection to all crimes was confirmed by a semen match.

== Exposure and manhunt ==
Shortly after the New York City Police Department (NYPD) launched a wanted poster campaign for information, an anonymous caller told officers that a man known as "Ace", who lived in the same apartment building as Washington, was a person of interest. "Ace" was identified as Kee from the matching apartment floor and description. Additionally, a baseball cap and hoodie left behind during the September 1998 rape had laundry tags to a dry cleaner frequented by Kee's mother. However, the evidence was not yet sufficient to request a DNA sample of Kee, but police put him under surveillance, leading to his arrest for theft when he was caught stealing a hard disk drive from a computer store. Kee refused to submit a DNA or fingerprint, claiming it was against his religion as a Jehovah's Witness, but a sample was retrieved from trash he left behind at the jail.

In January 1999, the NYPD conducted DNA testing on the biological evidence found on Rasheeda Washington's body. The DNA was linked to two Manhattan rape victims in 1995 and 1996 and led to the identity of the offender, Arohn Kee, who was now 25. The NYPD put up a reward of US$11,000 (equivalent to $21,300 in 2025) for any information leading to his arrest.

Before he could be arrested, Kee fled New York City for Florida, abducting 16-year-old Angelique Stallings, whom he had groomed during homework tutoring, to come with him, sparking a manhunt across the east coast of the United States. In the weeks after, Kee and Stallings rented many hotels, frequently moving from place to place around Miami. Miami Police stormed his hotel room on the evening of February 19, 1999. They rescued Stalling and flew her back to New York. Kee was soon flown back to New York, where he was charged with the murder of Rasheeda Washington, the kidnapping and false imprisonment of Stalling, and the two rapes from 1995 and 1996. Further testing of his DNA brought to light his involvement in the then unsolved murders of Paola Illera and Johalis Castro, as well as another rape from 1992.

== Trials ==
His trial started in 2000, with Kee being charged in all three murders and three other rapes, to which he pled not guilty. During the trial, Kee took the stand to make a statement in which he ranted that he was being framed, and that the DNA testing that was being used to convict him was fake, even though surviving victims identified him as their rapist. On December 16, 2000, the jury found him guilty of all three murders and the three other rapes. When the verdict was read, Kee yelled "Fuck all of y’all!" At his sentencing in January 2001, he made a statement and apologized for how he had acted at his trial. He was sentenced to three consecutive terms of life imprisonment.

After his conviction, authorities continued to conduct DNA testing on unsolved cases in the Harlem area to see if they could link a match in Kee's DNA to the evidence at the crime scenes. The testing was completed in 2004, and after that the NYPD now wanted to charge Kee with the July 1994 unsolved rape of a 17-year-old girl in her Harlem basement apartment. Kee's DNA was a match to the DNA the perpetrator had left on the girl.

His trial was ordered to start in June 2004, but instead of pleading his innocence, he fully admitted what he did, saying that he was now reformed and ready to win forgiveness. During the trial, Kee voiced remorse for what he had done, acknowledging his guilt, and asked for forgiveness during a statement. On August 12, 2004, Kee was sentenced to 20 years in prison for the rape to run concurrent with his three life sentences.

== See also ==
- List of serial killers in the United States
