= Disappearance of Adam, Trevor, and Mitchell O'Brien =

1996 missing child case in Canada

- Date: November 9, 1996
- Duration: Missing for 29 years, 7 months and 13 days
- Location: Torbay, Newfoundland and Labrador, Canada
- Type: Disappearance, child abduction
- Missing: Adam Matthew O'Brien (Born Oct. 28, 1982); Trevor Anthony Thomas O'Brien (Born May 8, 1985); Mitchell Gary Marcus O'Brien (Born Nov. 29, 1991)
- Suspects: Gary Joseph O'Brien (Born Oct. 17, 1956)

Adam, Trevor, and Mitchell O'Brien are missing brothers from Torbay, Newfoundland and Labrador, Canada who were allegedly abducted by their father Gary O'Brien on November 9, 1996. Their suspected kidnapping made both national and international headlines. Gary O'Brien is wanted by Interpol for their abduction. Although various tips have come in from both Canada and the United States and a $50,000 reward has been offered, police have never been able to locate the O'Brien brothers or their father.

== Disappearance ==
On November 9, 1996, Adam, Trevor, and Mitchell O'Brien (aged 14, 11, and 4) went to visit their father and non-custodial parent, Gary O'Brien, at his home in Torbay, Newfoundland and Labrador, Canada. At 8:30pm that night, Gary called Diana Boland, his ex-wife and the boys' mother and custodial parent, and told her that he was not going to return the boys to her and had rigged his house so that it would explode if anyone entered it. When Boland asked to speak to the boys, Gary told her "later" and hung up. Boland's sister, who was with Boland at the time, immediately called the police.

== Investigation ==
When police first arrived at the house, they discovered that O'Brien had set up a makeshift bomb using two 400-pound (180 kg) propane tanks that would have exploded and destroyed both his home and the surrounding houses if anyone had tried to get inside. Boland believes that this was done in order to create a diversion. O'Brien has a history of violence, suicidal tendencies, and psychiatric problems, and is described by Boland as "introverted" and "resourceful".

In October 1997, almost a year after the disappearance, an engine assembly for a 1989 Ford Tempo, which may have been from O'Brien's vehicle, was discovered in the ocean near Flatrock, approximately ten kilometres from where the boys disappeared. No bodies were recovered from that location. Boland suspects that O'Brien dumped the engine of his car over the cliffs and into the ocean in order to deliberately mislead police. The following year, police in Thunder Bay received an anonymous tip from a woman who stated that she'd recognized pictures of the brothers. The woman said that she'd babysat for them, and knew the nicknames of one of the boys. Police attempted to locate the woman until 1999, but were unsuccessful.

Although O'Brien's sister suspects that her brother and her nephews are dead, Boland firmly believes that her sons are still alive, stating that O'Brien may have taken them to a religious commune and reared them in an environment with no access to technology or the outside world. She believes that being cut off from the outside world may have allowed O'Brien to brainwash Adam, Trevor, and Mitchell, which could be why they have never tried to contact her.

In order to aid the search for the O'Brien brothers, the National Center for Missing & Exploited Children has created multiple age-progressed photos of the boys over the past two decades, with the most recent ones having been released in early 2017. As of 2024, their case remains open.

== See also ==
- List of people who disappeared mysteriously (2000–present)
