= Fa Ziying and Lao Rongzhi =

Chinese serial killer duo

Fa Ziying (Chinese: 法子英; pinyin: Fǎ Zǐyīng; 1 October 1964 – 28 December 1999) and Lao Rongzhi (Chinese: 劳荣枝; pinyin: Láo Róngzhī; 25 December 1974 – 18 December 2023) were a pair of Chinese serial killers, con artists, and robbers born in Jiujiang, Jiangxi. Fa and Lao met first at a friend's wedding in 1993. Between 1996 and 1999, after becoming a romantic couple, Fa and Lao committed a series of crimes, including kidnapping, robbery, and murder in Jiangxi, Zhejiang, Jiangsu, and Anhui. A total of seven people were killed and a total of over 100,000 yuan was stolen by the couple (roughly ¥30,000 through property theft and ¥70,000 through kidnapping ransom).

Fa was arrested on 23 July 1999 when a ransom handoff was interrupted by police. He was subsequently sentenced to death, deprived of political rights for life, and fined 20,000 yuan by the Hefei Intermediate People's Court. On 28 December 1999, Fa was executed by firing squad.

Lao, who had been on the run since 1999, was captured and arrested on 28 November 2019 in Xiamen. She was sentenced to death in September 2021 by the Nanchang Intermediate People's Court for intentional homicide, kidnapping, and robbery. She was also stripped of her political rights for life and had all of her personal property confiscated. Although Lao admitted to being an accomplice to Fa, she claimed to have only done so in fear of losing her own life, as Fa had physically and sexually abused her throughout their relationship. She appealed her conviction in court, though a second trial in August 2022 upheld the death sentence. Lao was executed on 18 December 2023 with the approval of the Supreme People's Court.

== Early life events before crime ==
=== Fa Ziying ===
Fa Ziying
- 法子英
- Fa Ziying in 1999
- Born: 1 October 1964; Jiujiang, Jiangxi, China
- Died: 28 December 1999 (aged 35); Feixi County, Hefei, Anhui, China
- Cause of death: Execution by gunshot
- Other names: Fa Lao Qi (法老七); Ye Weimin (叶伟民)
- Height: 5 ft 8 in (1.73 m)
- Convictions: Murder, kidnapping, robbery
- Penalty: Death

Details
- Victims: 7
- Span of crimes: 1996–1999
- Country: China
- Date apprehended: 23 July 1999

Fa Ziying was born on 1 October 1964, in Jiujiang, Jiangxi Province, (his ancestral home is in Henan, and his family lives in Xunyang District). Some reports say that the Fa family had been formerly wealthy, but by the time of his birth, Fa Ziying's family was poor. His father worked as a cart puller, delivering goods to local markets, and his mother was a tea saleswoman. The family lived next door to the block's public toilet, the area of the house having been only about 30 square meters, and they had to collect cinder and waste wood to maintain heating every winter. His parents had four sons and three daughters, and Fa Ziying was the youngest.

Fa Ziying had very poor academic performance, and dropped out after three years of primary school, but he liked to play football and was the captain of a junior football team. In 1979, Fa Ziying's father drowned while swimming in Yangtze River. Later, his mother suffered a car accident that left her with sequelae in her waist. Fa was sentenced 3 years labor reeducation for robbery when he was 15. In 1981, Fa was sentenced 8 years in jail for armed robbery and intentional injury by Jiujiang Intermediate People's Court. Following his release, Fa Ziying started a business owner and married a woman surnamed Miao in 1990, had a daughter with her in 1991. Less than two years into the marriage, he and his wife agreed to divorce.

=== Lao Rongzhi ===
Lao Rongzhi
- 劳荣枝
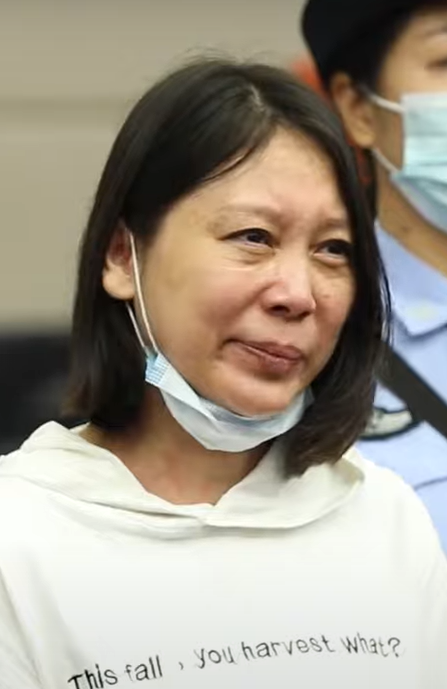
- Lao Rongzhi in 2021
- Born: 25 December 1974; Jiujiang, Jiangxi, China
- Died: 18 December 2023 (aged 48); Nanchang, Jiangxi, China
- Cause of death: Execution by lethal injection
- Other names: Chen Jia (陈佳); Gege (格格); Shen Lingqiu (沈凌秋); Sherry (雪莉); Hong Yejiao (洪叶娇)
- Height: 5 ft 4 in (1.63 m)
- Convictions: Murder, kidnapping, robbery
- Penalty: Death

Details
- Victims: 7
- Span of crimes: 1996–1999
- Country: China
- Date apprehended: 28 November 2019

Lao Rongzhi was born on 25 December 1974 in Jiujiang City, Jiangxi Province. Both her parents are originally from Huangmei, Hubei, and they worked for SINOPEC Jiujiang Company. Lao's father was a security guard of the oil depot while her mother was a family worker for the company. Lao Rongzhi was the youngest of five siblings. In 1989, after graduating from junior high school with excellent grades, Lao Rongzhi was admitted to Jiujiang Normal College to be trained as a future preschool teacher. She graduated from Jiujiang Normal School in 1992 and became a primary school Chinese language teacher in the school of the Jiujiang Company.

In 1993, while still working at the primary school, Lao Rongzhi met Fa Ziying. According to Lao Rongzhi's testimony in her second trial, she met Fa Ziying, who then owned a company, through a friend. Lao was aware of Fa's criminal past and that had served a prison sentence for fighting, but the two still began dating. Once on a date which was too late for her to go home, she was raped by Fa and became pregnant. Afterwards, Fa induced her to take a medicated abortion. After the abortion, she was raped by Fa again, resulting in another pregnancy four months later; this time, she had an abortion accompanied by Fa's sister.

The school Lao worked for was declining, it was rumored that the primary school was about to be discontinued, and the faculty would be assigned jobs at gas stations, which made Lao Rongzhi feel depressed. After teaching for about two years, Lao resigned. According to her brother, it was around this time she said she's going to do business with Fa Ziying. The family disagreed, and she even had a quarrel with her mother over this. In the end, her family allowed her to leave. During her second trial, Lao Rongzhi flatly denied that she and Fa Ziying were in a relationship, saying that she was "controlled and coerced" by Fa Ziying and that she was "mentally distracted" when they were together.

Lao Rongzhi said at the first instance that she left Jiujiang with Fa Ziying in May 1995 with 6,000 yuan, and they went to Shenzhen and Shanghai to start a business. The venture was unsuccessful and they soon ran out of money. They returned to Jiujiang in December 1995 where they stayed until late February, just after the Chinese New Year, when they left once more, marking the beginning of their crime spree. According to Lao, while in Shenzhen, their living expenses were high, about 200 yuan per day, but they had no stable source of income. Due to the lack of money, Lao began working as escort to make money, and she also looked for robbery targets along the way.

== Crimes ==
The prosecution accused Fa Ziying of kidnapping, robbery, and intentional homicide in Nanchang, Wenzhou, and Hefei. When Lao Rongzhi was tried, the prosecution added the kidnapping and robbery case in Changzhou to the list of cases. According to the trial, before the Nanchang murder, the duo had engaged in a string of crimes involving a "honey trap" scheme. Lao Rongzhi lured wealthy men to hotel rooms, where Fa Ziying would pose as her husband, violently rob the victims, and make off with hush money sums ranging from 70,000 to 80,000 yuan. Fa Ziying confessed to kidnappings in multiple cities, including Guangzhou, Changzhou, Nanning, Xiamen, Dongying, and Huangmei. During his final meeting with his defense lawyer, he admitted to additional crimes. However, due to insufficient evidence beyond his own confession and the technological limitations of the time, these additional crimes were not included in the final judgment.

=== Nanchang murder case ===
Fa and Lao came to Nanchang in May 1996, where Lao rented an apartment with the identity card stolen from a Shenzhen woman named Chen Jia, and she began working as an escort in a night club. In the night club Lao met a customer Xiong Qiyi (熊启义), a 35-year-old general manager of an air conditioning sales company who also ran a hotel. According to Fa Ziying's verdict, Lao Rongzhi identified Xiong Qiyi as a kidnapping target, and Fa Ziying followed Xiong Qiyi home but without further actions. On the morning of 28 July, Lao Rongzhi called to lure Xiong Qiyi to her apartment, where Fa Ziying appeared holding a knife and tied up Xiong with ropes, then robbed him of his watch, jewelry, and other valuables. Fa forced him to divulge his address before strangling him to death with a wire and dismembering his body, packing it up into four trash bags.

At the same night, they went to Xiong's home and gained access using Xiong's keys. Xiong's wife, 28-year-old Zhang Li (张莉), and their three-year-old daughter Xiong Lingxuan (熊灵璇) were asleep. Fa awoke both, robbed Zhang at knifepoint, then tied them up as he ransacked the apartment for the next hours, leaving Lao to keep watch. Fa further intimidated Zhang and her daughter by showing off two plastic bags that contained, among other body parts, her husband's severed head. Afterwards, Fa fatally strangled both Zhang and her daughter with a belt. Their corpses were left in a bathtub along with Xiong's body parts. According to the appraisal, Fa Ziying and Lao Rongzhi robbed the victims of valuables worth 30,274 yuan, 8,090 yuan, 110 Hong Kong dollars, and 10 US dollars in cash, 1,000 yuan worth of Jiangxi Post and Telecommunications Enterprise bonds, 1,000 yuan worth of Nanchang Telecommunications Bureau fundraising receipts, and a 95,000 yuan worth certificate of deposit. The rest of Xiong's remains were discovered two days later when neighbours noticed a rotten smell emanating from two black trash bags by the community dumpster. On 29 July, Nanchang Municipal Public Security Bureau of opened a robbery and homicide investigation, eventually identifying Fa and Lao as the perpetrators, issued a wanted notice for them on 18 August that same year.

=== Wenzhou murder case ===
After spending over a year wandering across East China, typically staying for no longer than 10 days at a time in each city, financing themselves through the adultery scams, Fa and Lao settled in Wenzhou in early October 1997. Lao worked at a KTV club as an escort with a stage name "Gege" and claimed to be from Sichuan. At Lao's suggestion, the duo decided to rob 22-year-old Liang Xiaochun (梁晓春), another escort girl working at the KTV club. Lao believed Liang to be well-off after she saw her wearing an Omega wrist watch to work. They accessed Liang's apartment by pretending to be interested in renting out the place, at which point Fa took her at knifepoint and searched her apartment for valuables. Unsatisfied with the loot, Fa forced Liang to call over another woman, 29-year-old Liu Suqing (刘素清), who was a forewoman at the KTV club. Upon Liu's arrival, Fa forced her to hand over a thousand yuan in cash and a 25,000 yuan deposit slip. He then tied her up with an electric wire. Following Fa 's instructions, Lao took Liu's phone and deposit slip to the bank to withdraw money. According to reports, the bank teller knows Liu Suqing and inquired why Lao Rongzhi, not Liu herself, was withdrawing the money. Lao replied that she was borrowing money from Liu. The teller did not stop her. Lao withdrew the entire 25,750 yuan from the account and signed Liu Suqing's name. Fa Ziying's verdict stated that after Lao Rongzhi successfully withdrew the money, she called him, and he immediately strangled both Liang and Liu using an electric wire and a belt. Fa Ziying took an Omega watch, a Rado watch, a mobile phone, and a pager from the two victims.

They left Wenzhou the same day by long-distance bus. Only a few hours later, Liang's phone was called several times by her boyfriend, identified by his surname Li. Lao eventually picked up, hoping to placate him with a cover story. Li immediately noted that Lao answered the call in Mandarin Chinese rather than Wenzhou dialect, yet still claimed to be an old friend of Liang, who never left Wenzhou in her whole life, and grew even more suspicious when Lao, unaware of who Li was, claimed that Liang went on a trip with her boyfriend. On 12 October, Li entered Liang's apartment by climbing over the balcony from a neighbour's room, where he discovered the bodies of the two women. Police detectives matched Fa Ziying's fingerprints on the electric mosquito repeller of which the wire was used to tie up the victims.

=== Changzhou kidnapping and robbery case ===
In September 1998, Fa Ziying and Lao Rongzhi came to Changzhou. They rented a room and settled down. Lao Rongzhi worked as an escort at the Royal Ballroom near Tongji Bridge in Changzhou, where she met Liu, the owner of an auto repair shop. According to Liu's testimony, Lao tried every possible way to get him to go to her place. Around 11:30 pm one night, he drove Lao home and went in with her. He has barely entered the door when Fa Ziying stabbed him in the chest with a knife. After Liu was subdued, Lao tied Liu's legs and arms to a chair with a wire. Liu recalled that Fa and Lao communicated very little during the process, and they were very tacit. Fa searched Liu, took his car key and left. The 5,000 yuan cash in Liu's car was also taken. The next morning, Fa told Liu to call his wife. Liu's wife, following his instructions, went to the designated bus stop with 70,000 yuan cash to meet Lao.

According to Liu's recollection, Fa instructed Lao to go out and meet Liu's wife, saying that if Lao did not return within two hours, he would kill Liu and then escape. Lao Rongzhi took a taxi back together with Liu's wife. Seeing her husband's mouth was stuffed and his hands and feet tied up, the wife handed over the ransom right away. Fa then tied her up and gagged her. After a brief conversation in dialect between the duo, Lao Rongzhi left first with the cash. About ten minutes later, she called Fa to indicate that she had safely evacuated. Fa was now entertaining the idea of killing the couple anyway, though he eventually relented after Liu and his wife repeatedly begged him to reconsider. Liu and his wife were the only survivors of the series of robberies and murders committed by Fa Ziying and Lao Rongzhi.

=== Hefei murder case ===
After nearly a year of hiding around in Guangxi, Shantou, and Hangzhou, among other places, Lao and Fa arrived in Hefei on 21 June 1999. Using false names and identities, they checked into two separate hotels less than two kilometers apart. In July, Fa Ziying rented a two-bedroom apartment, ordered a dog cage, and purchased a freezer. On 15 July, Lao began working as an escort at a local nightclub, with her false identity. There, she met Yin Jianhua (殷建华), the founder and owner of Hefei Anjida Electric Co., Ltd. According to Fa's defense attorney later, Yin was not actually wealthy and had to pretend to be affluent in social settings to maintain his company's business.

Lao invited Yin to her and Fa's apartment on 22 July, where he was taken hostage with a knife and locked in the dog cage, with intent to extort Yin's wife Liu Min (刘敏) for ransom. Yin, however, proved defiant and refused to cooperate with his captors, even after Fa reveals that he had done this before and killed people, brushing this off as a lie, believing him to not be capable of murder. To prove they were not bluffing, Fa went out on the street and convinced a 33-year old carpenter named Lu Zhongming (陆中明), to come to their apartment to fix a window. There the carpenter was attacked by Fa, who dragged him into bathroom and stabbed him 20 times in the back before beheading him with an axe. Fa then showed the head to Yin while Lao stored Lu's body away in the freezer. Yin, now realizing the gravity of his situation, wrote notes asking his wife to pay his kidnappers. Liu was called at 9:05 p.m. by her husband Yin asking her to go to Changjiang Hotel and handover the ransom to Fa. However, the two missed each other at the hotel somehow, and Fa rescheduled a ransom handover the next morning at Yin's home.

The next morning, Yin wrote one more note to his wife, and their home address on another note, as Fa requested. According to Fa's first instance verdict, Fa then strangled Yin with a wire, before he went to Yin's home with the two notes and a home-made gun. At her home, Liu managed to convince Fa to wait in the apartment while she would leave to collect the money from friends and colleagues. Instead, she fled the building as police raided the location, positioning snipers on nearby buildings and stationing officers at ground level in case Fa attempted to jump from the third story apartment's window. At 11:00 a.m., after hours of negotiations failed, tear gas was deployed, leading to Fa exiting the flat and opening fire upon the police officers. The standoff and subsequent fire exchange was filmed by a television crew. Fa was apprehended after being shot in the thigh.

The bodies of Yin and Lu were located on 27 July, when neighbours noticed the smell and had the landlord open the apartment to check. Yin was immediately identified by his wife. Unable to identify the body in the freezer, the police published a notice in local newspaper, but over 20 days passed and no one had contacted them. Only when Lu Zhongming's wife went to Hefei to report to police because she could not contact her husband, did the police confirm Lu's identity. Lu's wife quickly recognized his tool box. It was initially unknown whether Yin had been killed by Fa or Lao, who had escaped, though his estimated time of death point towards Lao being the culprit. Lao left only a note addressed to Fa, saying that she'd "wait for [him] at home".

== Interrogation, trial, and execution of Fa Ziying ==
On 23 July 1999, after apprehending Fa Ziying, the police rushed him to a local hospital for emergency treatment. Initially, Fa refused to reveal the whereabouts of Yin Jianhua. During his interrogation, Fa gave the police a false name Ye Weiming, he also made up a convoluted backstory for himself, claiming to have been orphaned during the 1976 Tangshan earthquake, then raised by an elderly man in Jiangshan, Zhejiang. He claimed that a man named Yao Long (姚龙) from Gushi, Henan, brought him and two other unidentified individuals to Hefei to carry out the kidnapping, and that the hostages had already been taken back to Gushi by them. On the morning of the 24th, Fa claimed that his accomplices would meet him at Changjiang Hotel. The police followed the information and set up an ambush, but to no avail. The police then took Fa to Gushi and asked him to identify the location where his accomplices were holding Yin Jianhua captive. On 27 July, the bodies of Yin and Lu were located, Fa was brought back to Hefei and interrogated, Fa Ziying reveals his true identity, and confessed to how he and Lao Rongzhi killed Yin and the carpenter Lu, during interrogation in the early hours of the 28th. The Anhui police issued a joint investigation notice to Jiangxi police. Upon hearing the news, the Nanchang police rushed to Hefei, and thus the 1996 Nanchang murder case was solved.

On 2 November 1999, the Hefei Municipal People's Procuratorate charged Fa Ziying with the crimes of kidnapping, intentional homicide, and robbery, and filed a public indictment with the Hefei Intermediate People's Court. On 18 November, the case was heard in the Hefei Intermediate People's Court. Fa reportedly argued in court that he was robbing the rich to give to the poor. According to other reports, Fa retracted his confession in court, claiming that all the crimes had nothing to do with Lao Rongzhi but were done by himself alone; he also claimed that he was a professional hitman hired by a Taiwanese boss to kill. The lead prosecutor in the case recalled that Fa was arrogant and showed not even a bit of remorse during the trial. The Hefei Intermediate People's Court sentenced Fa Ziying to deaths separately for kidnapping, intentional homicide, and robbery. It was decided to execute the death penalty, deprive him of political rights for life, and fine him 20,000 yuan. At the same time, the court ruled that Fa Ziying was exempt from paying compensation for the civil lawsuit attached to the criminal case on the grounds that he had no actual compensation ability. Fa Ziying did not appeal.

On 28 December 1999, Fa Ziying was executed by shooting in Feixi County, Anhui. The family of Fa, including his ex-wife, declined to visit him before his execution. Fa's final visitation was instead with one of his assigned public defenders, Yu Xi (俞晞), to whom he confessed all the murders once again, as well as several gun charges and associated thefts he committed in Huangmei, Chongqing, and Yunnan.

== Lao Rongzhi's escape and arrest ==
After Fa's arrest, Lao fled Hefei for Wuhan. She then traveled to Henan before moving to Chongqing, where she and Fa had established one of two "safehouses" (the other was in Wuhu, Anhui) to return to in case their crimes became public. She stayed there until January 2000, when she heard of Fa's execution in December 1999. For the next few years, Lao kept on the move through China, staying at hostels, hotels, and guesthouses, while engaging in prostitution to support herself. By 2016, Lao settled in Siming, Xiamen, presenting herself as being from Nanjing, and took up work as a waitress at a night club as Xue Li (a transliteration of an English name, Sherry). After a failed relationship with a male employee, she quit in 2017 and got a job at a car dealership as a saleswoman.

On 13 June 2019, in order to ensure the smooth progress of the celebration of 70th anniversary of the National Day, the Ministry of Public Security of China deployed the "Cloud Sword Operation" to combat crimes using scientific and technological means. When Lao was active in a crowded downtown area in Xiamen, her photo was taken by surveillance cameras. On 27 November, the big data analysis of the Siming police showed that the woman in a photo has a 97.33% similarity to the wanted criminal Lao Rongzhi. Siming police dispatched two teams to investigate and set up control. On November 28, the police arrested Lao at a watch shop in a shopping mall in Huli. She was working there as a saleswoman, and the owner of the watch shop was her boyfriend at the time, whom she met at the car dealership.

When arrested, Lao claimed to be "Hong Yejiao" from Nanjing. In the initial interrogation, Lao did not admit her true identity, claiming to be an orphan who never knew her birthplace or parents. Through DNA comparison, Xiamen police confirmed her identity. She finally admitted that she was Lao Rongzhi during the interrogation on the evening of the 29th.

On 5 December 2019, the Xiamen police handed over Lao Rongzhi to the Nanchang police. The Xiamen police found that she had not committed any crimes during her time hiding in Xiamen.

== Trial and execution of Lao Rongzhi ==
On 17 December 2019, the Nanchang Municipal People's Procuratorate approved the arrest of Lao Rongzhi by the Nanchang Public Security Bureau. On August 31, 2020, the Nanchang People's Procuratorate filed a public prosecution case with the Nanchang Intermediate People's Court against Lao Rongzhi on suspicion of intentional homicide, kidnapping, and robbery. Zhu Dahong, the wife of Lu Zhongming, the carpenter who was killed in the Hefei case, filed a civil lawsuit in conjunction with the criminal lawsuit, demanding that Lao Rongzhi compensate more than 1.35 million yuan.

On 21 December 2020, the Nanchang Intermediate People's Court commenced the trial of the Lao Rongzhi case. The public prosecutor accused Lao Rongzhi of colluding with Fa Ziying in committing intentional homicide resulting in one death, kidnapping two people resulting in one death, and robbery resulting in the deaths of five people. Lao pleaded not guilty to the charges of intentional homicide but admitted to the crimes of robbery and kidnapping. She said she did not conspire with Fa Ziying to commit the crime, she did not have the intention to harm or kill anyone, she was threatened by Fa and had no choice but to cooperate with him, she claimed that she was also a victim of Fa Ziying's sexual assault, and he took her as his money-making tool.

In court, Lao Rongzhi apologized to the victim's family and expressed her willingness to compensate, but she only had about 30,000 yuan in savings before she was arrested. She said that she had participated in crowdfunding and if she had the opportunity, she would be willing to compensate the victim through crowdfunding. Lao Rongzhi's defense attorney argued that she was a minor participant in the crimes, took the lead in confessing to the Changzhou kidnapping and robbery, demonstrated active rehabilitation efforts, maintained a clean criminal record for two decades prior to her arrest, expressed genuine remorse, and willing to compensate the victims' families. Based on these factors, the defense requested leniency in sentencing.

The prosecution believes that what Lao Rongzhi said in court is very different from her confession after being arrested, and her many defenses are not valid; her confession during the interrogation clearly reflects her criminal intent. Fa Ziying and Lao Rongzhi shared a clear division of labor in their crimes and were both primary perpetrators. Following the crimes, Fa consistently allowed Lao to escape with the loot first. The pair subsequently squandered the money together. Lao possessed multiple opportunities to flee from Fa, rendering the claim of coercion less tenable. The prosecutor said that Lao had a deep subjective malice and refused to plead guilty, and should be punished more severely. The victim's family also did not accept her statement, questioned the sincerity of her apology and compensation, and asked the court to sentence her to death.

On 9 September 2021, the Nanchang Intermediate People's Court publicly pronounced the first-instance verdict. The verdict determined that Lao Rongzhi intentionally killed five people, robbed one person, robbed a huge amount of money, constituted a statutory aggravating circumstance of home robbery, and kidnapped one person to death. The court sentenced her to death for multiple crimes, deprived her of political rights for life, and confiscated all her personal property. Lao Rongzhi was dissatisfied with the verdict and appealed in court. The court ruled that Lao Rongzhi should compensate Zhu Dahong, the plaintiff in the accompanied civil lawsuit, for economic losses of 48,065.5 yuan, and rejected the plaintiff's other requests. Zhu Dahong expressed dissatisfaction with the verdict but would not appeal.

On 23 September 2021, the Jiangxi Provincial Higher People's Court accepted Lao Rongzhi's appeal case. On 29 April 2022, Lao's defense lawyer received a notice stating that the court had decided to suspend the second-instance trial due to "irresistible forces". The lawyer explained that the COVID-19 pandemic had made it impossible to hold a court hearing, and to avoid exceeding the statutory trial period, the court had to suspend the trial. On 19 June 2022, the second-instance trial of the case resumed, and the hearing was held on August 18. After a three-day trial, the second-instance hearing concluded on 20 August. On 30 November 2022, the Jiangxi Provincial Higher People's Court issued a second-instance judgment, announcing that the appeal was rejected and the original death penalty verdict was upheld. The death penalty ruling has been submitted to the Supreme People's Court for review and approval."

On the morning of 18 December 2023, the Nanchang Intermediate People's Court executed Lao Rongzhi in accordance with the execution order issued by the Supreme People's Court. She was executed by lethal injection.

== See also ==
- List of serial killers in China
