= Hans van de Kimmenade =

- Born: Joannes Rafaël Maria van de Kimmenade; November 15, 1980 (age 44); Nijmegen, Netherlands
- Known for: being kidnapped and being held hostage

Joannes ("Hans") Rafaël Maria van de Kimmenade (born 15 October 1980 in Nijmegen, Gelderland) is from the Dutch van de Kimmenade family. This family is well known for their holdings in the textile industry.

On 3 May 1999, a group of at least four armed Arab men kidnapped the eighteen-year-old van de Kimmenade from his estate in Helmond, Netherlands, tied him and then forced him blindfolded into a waiting vehicle.

The abductors took van de Kimmenade to a hidden house in the forests in the southern part of the Netherlands. Immediately after the abduction several small planes started searching. After the case got a great deal of media attention, van de Kimmenade was dropped off - probably under the influence of drugs - in a nature preserve owned by a local water board within 48 hours. No reason was given for his release.

== Kidnap cases in the Netherlands ==
Other famous kidnappings in the Netherlands are:

- Freddy Heineken (1983)
- Gerrit Jan Heijn (1987)
- Derk Bolt (2017)

== See also ==
- List of kidnappings
