= Joseph Kondro =

American serial killer and kidnapper

- Joseph Kondro
- Born: Joseph Robert Kondro; May 19, 1959; Marquette, Michigan, U.S.
- Died: May 3, 2012 (aged 52); Washington State Penitentiary, Walla Walla, Washington, U.S.
- Other name: The Longview Serial Killer
- Convictions: First degree murder Second degree murder First degree child rape First degree child molestation
- Penalty: 55 years imprisonment

Details
- Victims: 2 convictions, many more strongly suspected
- Country: US
- State: Washington
- Date apprehended: 1997 (charged in prison for abduction, rape and murder of Kara Rudd while already jailed on previous charges)

Joseph Robert Kondro (May 19, 1959 – May 3, 2012), known as The Longview Serial Killer, was an American suspected serial killer implicated in the kidnapping, sexual assault, and murder of three children in or near Longview, Washington – 8-year-old Rima Traxler, 12-year-old Kara Rudd, and 8-year-old Chila Silvernails – in the 1980s and 1990s.

Kondro confessed to the first two murders and was strongly suspected in the third, and possibly linked to the disappearances of many other young girls in the region, before his death in prison of natural causes in 2012.

== Early life ==
Joseph Kondro was born on May 19, 1959, in Marquette, Michigan, to a Chippewa mother with six other children. He was adopted at birth by John and Elenor Kondro, who raised him in Iron River, Michigan, before the family moved to Castle Rock, Washington. He attended a Catholic parochial school.

As he would later admit to police, Kondro showed psychopathic tendencies from an early age, including engaging in frequent fights with other children, killing animals (including neighborhood pets), wielding a knife, and drinking alcohol as early as age 7. Kondro would subsequently elaborate on these early signs of psychopathy by explaining in detail his lack of empathy and violent desires, comparing himself to an alligator lying in wait, coming up occasionally to feed. He also admitted to molesting young girls while still a child himself, developing fantasies about murder as he grew older, and began amassing a lengthy criminal record including auto and petty theft, drunk driving, domestic abuse, drug dealing and forgery.

Kondro had several children but was unable to care for them, in significant part due to drug addiction and his recurring troubles with the law.

== Disappearance of Chila Silvernails and Rima Traxler ==
=== Chila Silvernails ===
Chila Silvernails

In the early 1980s, authorities were baffled by the unexplained disappearances of several young girls in southwestern Washington. Among these was Chila Silvernails, an 8-year-old girl of Kalama, Washington who vanished in 1982 on her way to catch a school bus. Her nude body was found the day after her disappearance; she had been raped and strangled. Kondro had dated Silvernails’ mother, but he was not initially suspected in the crime.

=== Rima Traxler ===
Rima Danette Traxler

On May 15, 1985, Rima Traxler, an 8-year-old third-grader at St. Helens Elementary School in Longview, Washington, went missing. She had been a well-behaved and academically successful child with little in the way of conflicts or behavioral issues, so the community suspected that she had become a kidnap victim rather than a runaway. However, there was little trace of exactly when or how she had disappeared.

Kondro had been friends with Rima's parents and was apparently drinking beer with Traxler's stepfather on the day she vanished. He was questioned by police, but not named as a person of interest in the case.

== Murder of Kara Rudd ==
Kara Patricia Rudd

On November 21, 1996, 12-year-old Kara Rudd vanished after entering a car on the grounds of her middle school in Monticello. As with the Traxler case, Rudd had been a popular girl with no behavioral issues and was not suspected as a runaway. Again there was a connection to Joseph Kondro, but this time the suspicions were more concrete. Kondro had been a childhood friend of Kara's mother, was known to the victim herself, and had frequently stayed in the family's garage before being evicted due to his chronic drinking issues.

Kondro was seen with lacerations on his skin that he could not explain shortly after Rudd's disappearance, suggestive of scratches from a girl's long nails acquired in a struggle. Most strikingly, Rudd had told a classmate of her plan to skip school on the day of her disappearance and was seen entering Kondro's vehicle, a Pontiac Firebird, making him the last person to be seen with her prior to her disappearance. Authorities still lacked sufficient evidence to make an arrest, but after a fruitless six week search, local detective Scott McDaniel decided to inspect the Mount Solo area near the Columbia River, which Kondro was known to frequent. There, police found Rudd's body under an abandoned Volkswagen; she had been raped and strangled. The car, which Kondro claiming he was so full of adrenaline, was able to lift and put on top of the body and thus allowed the preservation of critical forensic evidence, and DNA samples from the crime scene matched Kondro, who was arrested for Rudd's murder.

=== Arrest and prosecution ===
Under interrogation, Kondro admitted that he had taken Rudd to a swimming hole in Germany Creek, and then to an abandoned house near the Columbia River, where he raped and strangled her.

To avoid the death penalty, Kondro and his attorneys struck a deal with prosecutors, in which he confessed to the murder of Traxler more than a decade before. Kondro explained that he was already known and liked by the Traxler family, and he was able to trick the girl into entering his vehicle by mentioning the word "unicorn", a safety password taught to her by her parents, and which he had learned from her stepfather. He raped, bludgeoned, and strangled Traxler at Germany Creek, burying her beside a tree. By the terms of the plea deal, he was sentenced to 55 years in prison at the Washington State Penitentiary in Walla Walla. Because of his violent tendencies and criminal record, authorities strongly suspected he had been involved in the unexplained disappearances of other preteen girls throughout the region besides Traxler and Rudd. They were especially convinced of Kondro's role in Silvernails' disappearance in 1982, given the striking similarities in modus operandi between her case and those of the other girls, the location of the crime, and the fact that Kondro had dated Silvernails’ mother. Detectives planned to question him further about the other unsolved disappearances, but he balked at discussing them due to concerns about a capital punishment imposition.

On May 3, 2012, 16 days before his 53rd birthday, Kondro died in prison of liver disease likely related to Hepatitis C infection.

== Media and criminal profiling ==
Kondro's cases, his victims and the circumstances surrounding his actions have all drawn considerable attention across print, internet and broadcast media, not only due to the heinous nature but also to the possible factors and implications in the development of psychopathy, and the potential for psychological profilers to identify warning signs and traits of serial killers and violent criminals. Such criminal profiles can be used to identify criminals at high risk of becoming violent offenders, expediting both steps to monitor and alter the violent behavior (including in youth detention centers for juvenile offenders) as well as protect potential victims.

Kondro was profiled by John E. Douglas of the FBI Behavioral Science Unit (BSU), one of the founders of offender profiling, on the MSNBC documentary (and subsequent Netflix series) Mindhunter. Douglas also discussed his profiling of Kondro in-depth in his book (co-authored with Mark Olshaker), The Killer Across the Table. The detective work and investigations into the abductions of Traxler and Rudd, and possibilities of Kondro's involvement with other disappearances in the Longview region, were featured in several true crime articles and books, including The Longview Serial Killer by author Lori Carangelo, and a number of television documentaries, including On the Case with Paula Zahn (episode "Broken Trust") and Cold Case Files ("Unicorns and Alligators").

== See also ==
- List of serial killers in the United States
