= Murder of Jodi Parrack =

Murder and rape of young American girl

Jodi Parrack
- Jodi Christine Parrack
- Born: Jodi Christine Parrack; September 2, 1996; USA
- Died: November 8, 2007 (aged 11); Constantine, Michigan, U.S.
- Cause of death: Suffocation
- Body discovered: November 8, 2007
- Occupation: Student

Jodi Christine Parrack (September 2, 1996 – November 8, 2007) was an 11-year-old girl from Constantine, Michigan who was kidnapped while riding her bicycle on a local street, then sexually assaulted and murdered. Her case drew considerable media attention not only due to the heinous nature of the crime but also due to the wrongful conviction and incarceration of an innocent man, Ray McCann.

== Case and initial investigations ==
Jodi Parrack, a fifth-grade student at the Riverside Elementary School, disappeared on November 8, 2007, while riding her bicycle. She was subsequently found near a headstone at the Constantine Township Cemetery; she had died of asphyxiation, and there was evidence of sexual assault. Police initially blamed Raymond McCann, a reserve police officer, for the murder after McCann had suggested searching the local cemetery. McCann insisted that his suggestion was based on his experience with criminal investigations, knowledge of the town's geography and intuition, but some questioned if his suggestion itself indicated involvement. McCann later stated his interrogations were intensive and that authorities had (falsely) claimed that DNA evidence had linked him to the crime scene, a practice which the United States Supreme Court had allowed in its ruling in Frazier v. Cupp. McCann continued to deny any connection to Parrack's abduction, and no evidence had linked him to the crime. However, in 2015, investigators charged him with five counts of perjury after claims that he had lied about his path during the search for Jodi, and that a surveillance camera near a creamery did not show him walking where he had claimed to be (it was later disputed if the camera had the correct angle to note his presence). McCann pleaded no contest to one of the perjury counts and was sentenced to a term of 22 months to 22 years in prison. In September 2023, McCann was exonerated and a seven person jury awarded him $14.5 million for having his constitutional rights violated by a Michigan State Police Sergeant.

== Murderer ==
Authorities' focus changed when, in 2015, nearly 8 years after the murder, another girl from White Pigeon, Michigan was attacked in an attempted abduction by Daniel K. Furlong, 65, who had attempted to take her into his garage. Furlong was a local youth sports coach, and he was taken into custody upon discovery of a “kidnap list” in his home, with indications that Furlong had been targeting several girls in the region. The list not only aroused suspicion that Furlong might have been behind the abduction of Jodi Parrack, but also raised questions about a possible connection to the disappearance of another local little girl, Brittney Beers, who had disappeared in 1997. DNA samples from the crime scene where Jodi Parrack had been found were then matched to samples from Furlong. He confessed that he had snatched the girl from her bicycle while riding beside his home, after which he dragged her into his garage where she was tortured and raped in his boat. He bound her with zip-ties and then smothered her with a plastic bag, before taking her body to the cemetery. Furlong was given a sentence of 30-to-60 years in prison. With the sentencing of the perpetrator, McCann continued to press his case to have his own charges dismissed and was subsequently fully exonerated of the crime.

The case has continued to receive discussion due to the fraudulent investigation, police misconduct and wrongful conviction of Ray McCann. These issues, and the case's eventual resolution, were discussed in a number of articles and depicted in the episode “Small Town Killer” on the true crime series “Scene of the Crime with Tony Harris.”

== See also ==
- List of homicides in Michigan
- List of kidnappings
