= Allan Grimson =

British convicted murderer

- Born: 1958 (age 67–68); North Shields, Northumberland, UK
- Penalty: Life sentence with a minimum of 22 years' imprisonment

Details
- Victims: 2–22
- Span of crimes: 1997–1998
- Country: United Kingdom (possibly New Zealand)

Allan Michael Grimson (born 1958) is a British convicted rapist, murderer, and suspected serial killer who is responsible for murdering at least two Royal Navy sailors and who is suspected of killing many others, possibly up to another 20 undiscovered victims. The judge, who sentenced him to a minimum term of 22 years at his trial, said that Grimson was "a serial killer by nature if not by number". Because his two victims were killed on the same date exactly a year apart (12 December), detectives believe there may be more victims as yet unidentified. He is the prime suspect in the disappearance of Simon Parkes, another young Royal Navy sailor who also vanished on 12 December from Gibraltar while Grimson was docked in the area. In July 2026, Grimson was found guilty of a series of sex offences against men and boys in the 1990s.

== Royal Navy ==
Grimson joined the Royal Navy in 1978 and by the time of his conviction for murder, he had achieved the rank of Petty Officer (PO). He had served aboard HMS Illustrious and was a trainer in fire fighting techniques whilst based at HMNB Portsmouth. Whilst being questioned by police, Grimson admitted that he scoured the ranks of trainees and cadets (that passed through HMS Excellent on the courses that he instructed on) so that he could dominate and kill the best-looking ones.

== Victims ==
His first known victim was 18-year-old Nicholas Wright who was in the Royal Navy. Grimson had met Wright on a fire-fighting course run by the Royal Navy in November 1997. Grimson offered to give Wright a lift home to Leicester on the weekends, but Wright and his family were suspicious of his motives. Whilst Wright was on shore leave from HMS Edinburgh in December 1997, he was seen out drinking with Grimson. They were witnessed leaving a Portsmouth nightclub together and according to Grimson, they went back to his flat where Grimson tried kissing Wright. Wright spurned his advances and Grimson attacked Wright firstly by punching him, then with a baseball bat (landing several blows) and then cutting his throat with a carving knife and dumping his body in the bath of Grimson's flat. Wright's body was later dumped beside the A272 road near Cheriton in Hampshire. Grimson was questioned by military police in 1997, but lied to keep himself out of the investigation.

Grimson detailed the killing to officers whilst being interviewed in December 1999. He admitted to getting a thrill from killing Wright. He said the thrill came from the power he had over the younger man and that the killing had no sexual element to it; however, he did admit that the feeling was "better than an orgasm".

His second victim was 20-year-old Sion Jenkins who was killed a year later in December 1998. Jenkins was originally from Newbury and had been in the Royal Navy for a brief spell. At the time of his murder, he was working as a barman in the Hogs Head pub in Portsmouth and had met up with Grimson in a nightclub called Joanna's in the town. Jenkins was drunk, and both he and Grimson went back to Grimson's flat where Jenkins was forced to have sex after Grimson punched and threatened him. In the morning, Jenkins expressed his desire to leave and Grimson wished to recapture the same feeling of elation that he had when he murdered Wright the previous year. Jenkins was bound to the bath and severely beaten with a baseball bat resulting in his death. His body was dumped next to the A32 road at the village of West Tisted in Hampshire.

== Conviction and life sentence ==
Grimson was convicted in 2001 of killing Nicholas Wright and Sion Jenkins and the judge recommended that he serve a minimum of 22 years but also that he should never be released. This sentence was increased to 25 years by the then Home Secretary. In 2008, Grimson won a reduction in his life sentence by three years. This was to reflect the time he had spent on remand. The review noted his guilty plea, the time spent on remand and also his personality disorder. After assessment by psychologists, opinion was divided on Grimson's mental health. Whilst it was generally believed that Grimson was responsible for his actions, one psychologist labelled Grimson as being the worst psychopath that he had come across in 250 murderers.

At the trial, Justice Cresswell told Grimson, "You are a serial killer in nature if not in number. You are a highly dangerous serial killer who killed two young men in horrifying circumstances."

== Other victims ==
Police investigated the disappearance of naval rating Simon Parkes from HMS Illustrious whilst she was docked in Gibraltar in 1986. Grimson and Parkes both served on HMS Illustrious at that time and witnesses have placed the two together on the night that Parkes disappeared. British police have flown over to Gibraltar and have used sniffer dogs and have searched the sewers in attempts to discover Parkes' body. In 2005, the BBC broadcast two programmes (The Search for Simon Parkes & October's edition of Crimewatch) which prompted Grimson to complain through his solicitor to Ofcom. Grimson complained that he had been unfairly treated in comparison to other suspects and that he had strenuously denied killing Parkes, but that was not mentioned in the programme. He also said that he had not been given enough notice by the BBC to respond to the claims in the two programmes and that police evidence used had no bearing on the case. Ofcom did not uphold either complaint.

Police are also speculating that there are other unknown victims and believe that as Grimson killed people on the twelfth of December each year, that there could be a range between 11 and 20 unidentified victims at Grimson's hands.

In 1998, Grimson was working at the Royal New Zealand Navy base of Devonport on an exchange programme of fire fighting training. Whilst he was there, a 29-year-old female Japanese immigrant, Kayo Matsuzawa, was found dead and hidden in a fire alarm cupboard in a stairwell of a building in Auckland. Grimson was considered as a suspect (although there are others) as he was friendly with the building manager. The building manager admitted that he had seen Grimson in the building on several occasions, and whilst Grimson was a suspect, investigators have noted that his other victims were men.

== Possible release and sex offence conviction ==
In 2019, it was reported that Grimson was being held in an open prison in preparation for a possible release. In October 2022, the parole board confirmed that Grimson, by now having served his minimum term of imprisonment, would have an oral parole hearing the next month to determine whether he would be released. Seventy-six-year-old Margaret Parkes, mother of suspected victim Simon Parkes, voiced her opposition to the possible release, stating: "I wouldn't want him to be out. I think he's a dangerous person. How can someone with that mentality change?", further adding: "We hope the truth about Simon's death will come out before we go to our graves. If he is a decent human being and has an ounce of compassion left in his body [Grimson] will do the right thing—but unfortunately I don't think he's that type of character". On 8 July 2025, Grimson was refused parole on public safety grounds.

In February 2025, as Grimson's potential release date was nearing, he was charged with sexual offences against four men and boys in the 1990s as a result of an investigation by journalist Ros Astengo. Grimson had admitted to these crimes after his arrest in 1999 but had not been charged because he was already facing a life sentence for murder. Grimson stood trial at Winchester Crown Court in 2026 charged with one count of rape, eleven counts of indecent assault and one count of taking indecent photographs of a child. The court heard that Grimson had admitted that he wanted to kill at least one of the victims, expressing his frustration that he had allowed him to leave his flat alive. Grimson's defence argued that the charges were a ploy to prevent Grimson from being released. Grimson was found guilty on every count on 27 July 2026. On 6 November he was sentenced to an additional 22 years in prison for these crimes.

== Documentaries ==
As well as Grimson's links to unsolved murders being the subject of the two BBC programmes in 2005 (The Search for Simon Parkes and the October 2005 edition of Crimewatch), his case was also featured in a 2019 documentary as part of Crime+ Investigation's series Murdertown. The programme was the opening episode of series 2 and was titled "Portsmouth".

== See also ==
- List of serial killers by country
- List of open prisons in the United Kingdom – Grimson is currently being held at one of England's 12 open prisons
- Colin Norris – British serial killer convicted in 2008
- David Smith – another British killer suspected of being responsible of other murders
- Murder of Helen Gorrie – infamous nearby Hampshire murder case also in the 1990s
