= Jean-Marc Connerotte =

Belgian examining magistrate and judge

Jean-Marc Connerotte (born 1948) in Neufchâteau, Belgium is an examining magistrate and judge known for his role in the Dutroux case.

== Biography ==
Connerotte entered bar association of Tournai in 1979.

He was responsible for the investigation into the assassination of André Cools in 1994.

In October 1996, Connerotte was removed from the investigation of Dutroux by the Court of Cassation. His impartiality was impaired because he had attended a fund-raising dinner for the families of the victims of Marc Dutroux. There he had received a pen and a bowl of spaghetti as a gift. The affair became known as the "spaghetti affair" in Belgium. His removal from the case sparked national outrage in Belgium. He was considered a good judge as his decisions had led to the rescue of two of Dutrouxs victims. Over 300,000 people protested his removal and other errors in the investigation during the White March in October 1996 in Brussels.

== Theories ==
According to Connerotte the close protection he was subjected to in the Dutroux affair, under the pretext that a "kill contract" was on him, was only present to watch him and put him under pressure. After he was removed from the case he wasn't granted any protection anymore.

He said that his attempts to find evidence concerning Michel Nihoul (alleged accomplice of Dutroux) were met with reluctance.

Connerotte was convinced of the involvement of Michel Nihoul in the abduction of Laetitia Delhez and also thought that he was the leader of a child abduction operation by Dutroux.

== See also ==
- White March
