= Carine Russo =

Belgian politician

- Born: Carine Collet; 1 May 1962 (age 64); Liège, Belgium
- Occupations: Politician; Author
- Political party: Ecolo
- Spouse: Gino Russo (m. 1982)
- Children: Mélissa (deceased)

Carine Russo (née Collet; born 1 May 1962) is a Belgian politician, member of Ecolo, and writer. She was elected as a member of the Belgian Senate in 2007 with a result of 57747 votes.

== Family ==
She married Gino Russo in 1982.

Her daughter, Mélissa, was one of six girls and women abducted by Marc Dutroux between 1995 and 1996. On 24 June 1995, 8-year-old Mélissa and her friend, Julie Lejeune, also 8 years old, were abducted from Grâce-Hollogne and imprisoned in a dungeon beneath Dutroux's house 93.4 km (58.0 mi) away in Marcinelle, Charleroi, where they eventually starved to death while Dutroux was serving time in prison for theft. On 17 August 1996, Dutroux led police to the location where the bodies of the girls, along with that of his accomplice Bernard Weinstein, whom he admitted killing, were buried in the backyard of another of his homes in Sars-la-Buissière. On 17 August 2016, exactly twenty years after the exhumation of Mélissa and Lejeune's bodies, Carine Russo published a book, Quatorze mois (English: Fourteen months), in which she included letters she had written to her daughter during the fourteen months she was missing.

== See also ==
- Marc Dutroux
- White March
- Jean-Denis Lejeune
