= Emanuele Corocher =

Italian writer

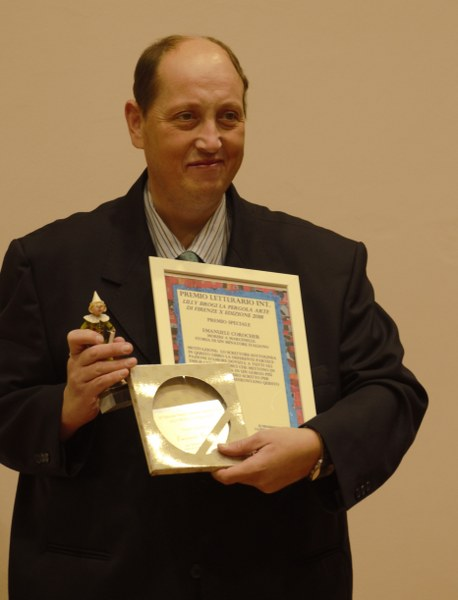
- Born: 26 October 1971 (age 55); Verona, Italy
- Occupation: Writer
- Writing career
- Notable awards: third place at the Wilde prize with the unpublished novel "Viviamo follemente ogni istante". Report on the Mario Luzi Award in 2019.

Emanuele Corocher is an Italian writer born in Verona, Italy, living and working in Verona, Italy. His novel "Morire a Marcinelle" published by Tra le righe libri for the social theme and for the memory of the terrible disaster that took place in Marcinelle.

He wrote the books: “Il Piccolo Popolo e il pianeta Terra” and “Cento anni di eroismi sconosciuti”, in 2015. In 2016 he also wrote the folklore story: “Euro Carnevale 2016 - Storia di due famosi Carnevali” . He wrote the sylloge: “Spirale di farfalle” in the same year. Some of his lyrics were published in the poetic anthology “Il vento della poesia” created by the Carta e Penna Cultural Association. It is included in the anthology Riviera Laurence Olivier Vivien Leigh Award 2016. In the Solidarity Anthology - Various Authors - Lo Dono from me. CTL publisher. His writings are also present in the anthology Literary Poetry: Pianeta Donna. Created by the Cultural Association La Pergola Arte by Lilly Brogi; which was published by Novecento di Firenze. It is a part of the 42nd volume of the Anthology "Poets and Contemporary Writers in the Mirror", with the story published for children: "La favola di Nose" (June 2017). With the 5th Premio Città di Sarzana he joined the International Literary Anthology 2017 with an excerpt from the book, "One Hundred Years of Unknown Heroism" (July 2017). He has participated in numerous competitions receiving prizes throughout Italy. in 2019 III Premio Nazionale “Novella Torregiani” special Prize of the President of the Jury with the story "After the destruction of the chapter library"., Price Città di Pontremoli Special testimonial Award for "Morire a Marcinelle",

== Published works ==
- Corocher, Emanuele (2013). Dialogo con il misterioso <<Piccolo Popolo>>. Storia da Babele ad oggi (in Italian). Seneca. ISBN 9788861224629.
- Corocher, Emanue (2015). Il piccolo popolo e il pianeta Terra (in Italian). Albatros il filo. ISBN 9788856773163.
- Corocher, Emanuele (2015). Cento anni di eroismi sconosciuti (in Italian). Albatros il filo. ISBN 9788856776300.
- Corocher, Emanuele (2017). Morire a Marcinelle storia di un minatore italiano (in Italian). Tra le righe libri. ISBN 9788832870107.

== Poetry anthologies ==
- Pasaro, M. (2017). "Lo dono da me" – Autori vari (in Italian). CTL. ISBN 9788898972258.
- Manescalchi, Franco (2017). "Pianeta Donna" – Autori vari (in Italian). Youcanprint. ISBN 9788892666313.

=== Stories anthologies ===
- Antologia de Il Premio Internazionale "Michelangelo Buonarroti" (in Italian). 2017.
- "Poeti e Scrittori Contemporanei allo SPECCHIO" – Autori vari (in Italian). Helicon editore. 2017.
- "Racconti di terra" – Autori vari (in Italian). Delfino&Enrile editore. 2018. ISBN 9788899866440.
- "Racconti del vento" – Autori vari (in Italian). Historica editore. 2018. ISBN 9788833370750.
- "Il canto delle muse" – Autori vari (in Italian). 2019.

== Awards and honors ==
- Finalist at the Prospektiva 2017 with the book "“Il sogno di un minatore” in Lucca.
- Special prize jury for the category narrative for boys at 42nd edition of Premio Letterario Casentino "Silvio Miano" 2017
- Finalist at Prize Raffaele Crovi 2018 at Castelnovo ne' Monti with the "Morire a Marcinelle".
- First place at Prize Rassegna d'arte e letteratura omaggio a Cortona 2018 at the category Stories
- Reporting poetry section literary award "Il canto delle muse" 2019.
