= List of protected heritage sites in Neufchâteau, Luxembourg Province =

This table shows an overview of the protected heritage sites in the Walloon town Neufchâteau, Luxembourg Province. This list is part of Belgium's national heritage.

Object	Year/architect	Town/section	Address	Coordinates	Number^{?}	Image
Griffin Tower, Place du Château ^{(nl)} ^{(fr)}		Neufchâteau		49.838425°N 5.434018°E	84043-CLT-0001-01 Info	Toren Griffioen, Place du Château
building ^{(nl)} ^{(fr)}		Neufchâteau	Rue Respelle n° 19	49.881173°N 5.470824°E	84043-CLT-0005-01 Info	
Building in hamlet Lahérie ^{(nl)} ^{(fr)}		Neufchâteau	Longlier	49.864516°N 5.482949°E	84043-CLT-0011-01 Info	
Washing place ^{(nl)} ^{(fr)}		Neufchâteau		49.888187°N 5.450224°E	84043-CLT-0016-01 Info	Wasplaats

== See also ==
- List of protected heritage sites in Luxembourg (Belgium)
