= Jean-Denis Lejeune =

Belgian political activist (born 1959)

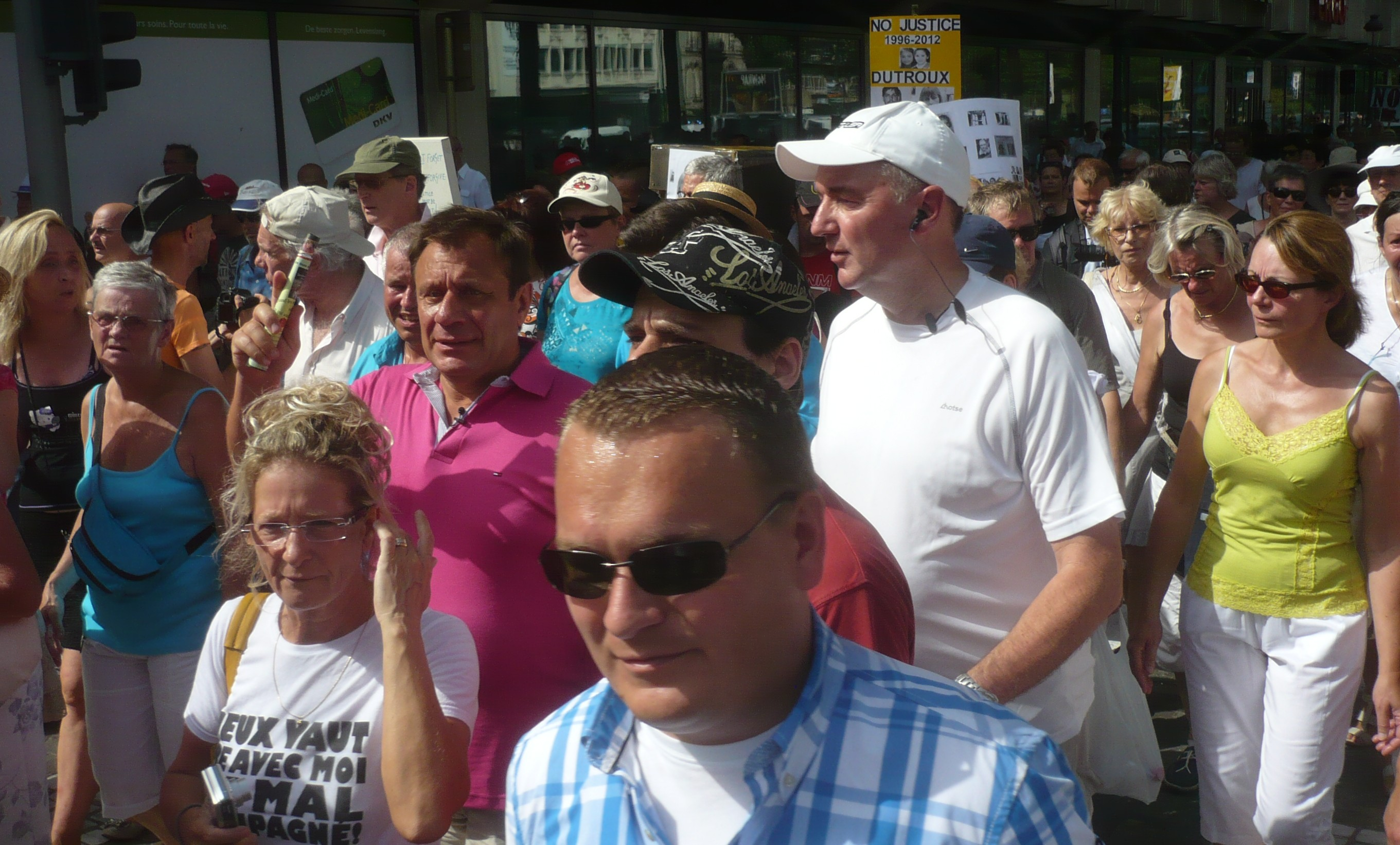
Jean-Denis Lejeune (second row, centre) at a demonstration against the release of Michelle Martin.

Jean-Denis Lejeune (born 1959) is the father of Julie Lejeune, who was abducted along with Mélissa Russo in Belgium on 24 June 1995, and imprisoned in Marc Dutroux's cellar. She was eight years old at the time. She died, probably of starvation, sometime between 6 December 1995 and 20 March 1996. The bodies were found on 17 August 1996.

== Background ==
In June 1996, Lejeune began work on the creation of a missing children helpline, which by 1998 was operational as Child Focus, the European Centre for Missing and Sexually Exploited Children. Lejeune was one of the leaders of a massive protest march (the "White March") of an estimated 300,000 people in Brussels, on 20 October 1996, in which demands were made for reforms of Belgium's police and justice system.

Since 2005, Lejeune has been working with Claude Lelièvre, the Commissioner for Children Rights of the French (i.e. French-speaking) Community of Belgium. Lejeune is active in politics through the Humanist Democratic Centre party. He was a candidate in the general election of 13 June 2010, on the same list as Melchior Wathelet, the son of Melchior Wathelet, who as minister of justice had prematurely released Marc Dutroux. Lejeune became an advisor on energy and environment in the department of Belgian State Secretary Melchior Wathelet (the younger). Lejeune is active in projects in developing countries. Most notably Objectif Ô, an NGO which aims to provide drinking water in developing countries. Objectif Ô is not recognised by the Belgian government, so it can not make claim to grants. In 2014, Lejeune was elected as a municipal councillor in Flémalle.

In 2007, Lejeune published a book in memory of his daughter titled: Dis à ma fille (Tell My Daughter).

Lejeune has since separated from the mother of Julie, Louisa. In 2012 he married Alao Kasongo; the best man was Marc Wilmots. The couple have a daughter named Nouma.

== See also ==
- Carine Russo
- Child Focus
- List of kidnappings
- White March
