= Regina Louf =

Belgian victim of organised sexual abuse

Regina Louf (born January 29, 1969), also known as witness X1 in the Dutroux case, is a Belgian author and alleged victim of organised sexual abuse. She has claimed to be a witness in the case around Marc Dutroux.

== Alleged abuse ==
Louf said that she had been sexually abused by family members since age four. Her parents are Georges and Christiane Louf. Her grandmother and mother also prostituted her out. Her grandmother, Cécile Bernaert, was the widow of the chief commissioner of police. She is alleged to have run two brothels during the time of the Second World War. Louf claims that her parents sold her to a man, Tony Van den Bogaert, as a child. He repeatedly took her to sex parties since age 11. Her grandmother and acquaintances of the family confirmed that Regina Louf had a sexual relationship with Tony at least since age 12. She claims that many other children were also at the parties and that the orgies would be filmed for blackmailing purposes. Louf claims that the parties also included sadism, torture, and murder.

According to Louf, Marc Dutroux would frequent these parties and provide the girls with drugs, as well as looking after them; his reward being allowed the girls for his pleasure as well. Louf claims that she met businessmen, politicians, police, and justice personnel at the parties. She named some other victims of the child sex ring, who were murdered in order to not be able to go to the authorities, namely Christine Van Hees, Katrien De Cuyper, and Carine Dellaert. She was able to describe how they were murdered, and her descriptions matched the autopsy of two corpses of the victims, as police confirmed. Police officer Rudi Hoskens said, "She gave us some details that made us think it's impossible to give without having been there at that place - the way the body was found at that time, and the way she described the person who was killed." Louf described the place of a murder, which was a disused mushroom farm on the outskirts of Brussels. The farm was later demolished, but in 1996 Louf described to the police team its intricate details: the wallpaper, the sinks, hooks on the ceiling, a network of stairs, and adjoining rooms unique to that building. Louf also described the murder of Katrien de Cuyper. She accused herself of having murdered her in a letter she wrote to the magazine Blik. She said that there she was ordered to kill Christine Van Hees. However, this testimony of Louf could never be confirmed nor dismissed.

Louf claims that Michel Nihoul was also a regular at the orgies. He rewarded his business partners with the girls. She also said that there were "regulars" attending the parties around the circle of Nihoul, including advocates from Brussels, a Flemish mayor, and a former prime minister. Louf said, "It was highly organised. Big business. Blackmail. There was a lot of money involved."

== Involvement in the Dutroux case ==
Louf was one of ten victims that came forward when a Belgian judge, Jean-Marc Connerotte, filed an appeal in the Dutroux case and called for further victims to come forward. She was given the code name "witness X1". An officer in the Dutroux case, Patriek De Baets, fully believed Louf as she had detailed knowledge about two murders surrounding the case. The officers in the case were working from Neufchâteau.

Connerotte, the judge who had filed for appeal, was dismissed from the case because he attended a fundraising dinner for the families of the victims of Dutroux. The original police officers who interviewed Louf at first were replaced. They had planned on conducting a nationwide operation to investigate all claims of Regina Louf, including searching private properties and interrogation of the named persons. The proceeding judge, Jean-Claude Van Espen, discarded the testimony of X1 and stopped the operation. Louf was eventually not called in to testify. The new residing judge, Anne Thily, declared that she was a fantasist, as Louf named a number of elite from Belgian politics and business in her testimony.

== Psychological examination ==
According to the psychologist Paul Igodt, who led a council of five psychiatrists to assess Louf on the order of the judiciary, she has dissociative identity disorder caused by severe and prolonged sexual abuse she suffered in her childhood. However, this does not make her testimony less credible and is a common long-term health consequence of severe early childhood abuse.

== Private life ==
Louf lives in Ghent with her husband and four children. She is the owner of a dog kennel and animal shelter.

== Publications ==
- Silence, on tue des enfants ! (French) with a preface of Leon Schwartzenberg, Éditions Factue (18.09.2002), ISBN 978-2940313136
- Zwijgen is voor daders: de getuigenis van X1 (Dutch) (1.09.1998) Uitgeverij Houtekiet, ISBN 978-9052404875
