= Pastur =

Pastur may refer to

- Leonid Pastur (born 1937), Ukrainian mathematician and physicist
- Paul Pastur (1866–1938), Belgian lawyer and politician
- Château Pastur, Jodoigne, Belgium
