= Lake Neufchâteau =

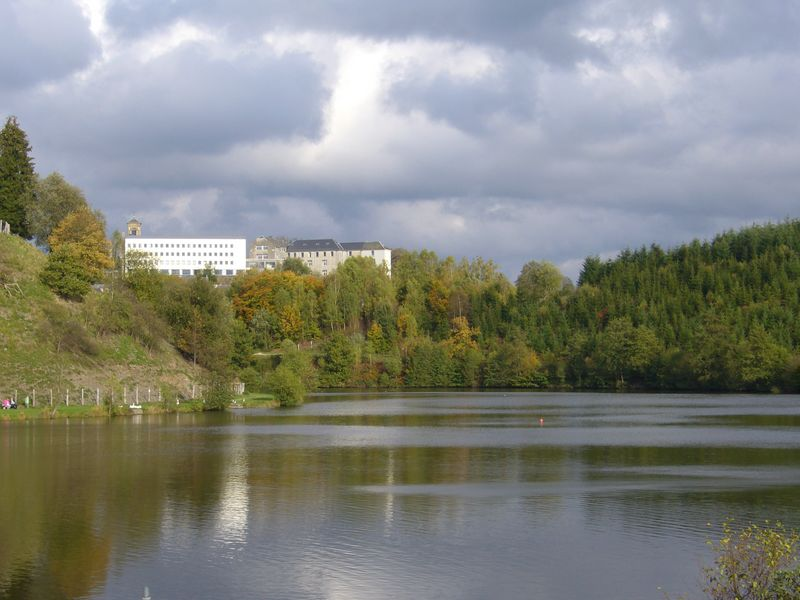

- Location within Belgium
- Coordinates: 49°50′10″N 05°25′40″E
- Type: Freshwater artificial lake
- Basin countries: Wallonia, Belgium
- Max. length: 0.5 km (0.31 mi)
- Max. width: 0.1 km (0.062 mi)
- Surface area: 6 ha (15 acres)
- Surface elevation: 395 m (1,296 ft)
- Islands: 0
- Settlements: Neufchâteau

Lake Neufchâteau is a small artificial lake in Wallonia near the city of Neufchâteau in the Ardennes in Belgium. The lake was built in 1958.
