= Claude Lelièvre =

Belgian government official (born 1946)

Claude Lelièvre (born 19 May 1946) is a Belgian government official. He is the Commissioner for Children Rights of the French community of Belgium, an office similar to the children's ombudsman agencies elsewhere.

In 1994, Lelièvre falsely denounced Belgian journalist Pierre Swennen as a paedophile, based on false information provided by Marie-France Botte, notably causing Swennen to lose his job. The claim was unfounded but Lelièvre refused to reveal his source, preventing a proper investigation. In 2004, it was finally proven that the accusation was false, and Botte was ordered to pay substantial damages.

== See also ==
- Jean-Denis Lejeune
