= Marc Dutroux =

Belgian serial killer and serial rapist (born 1956)

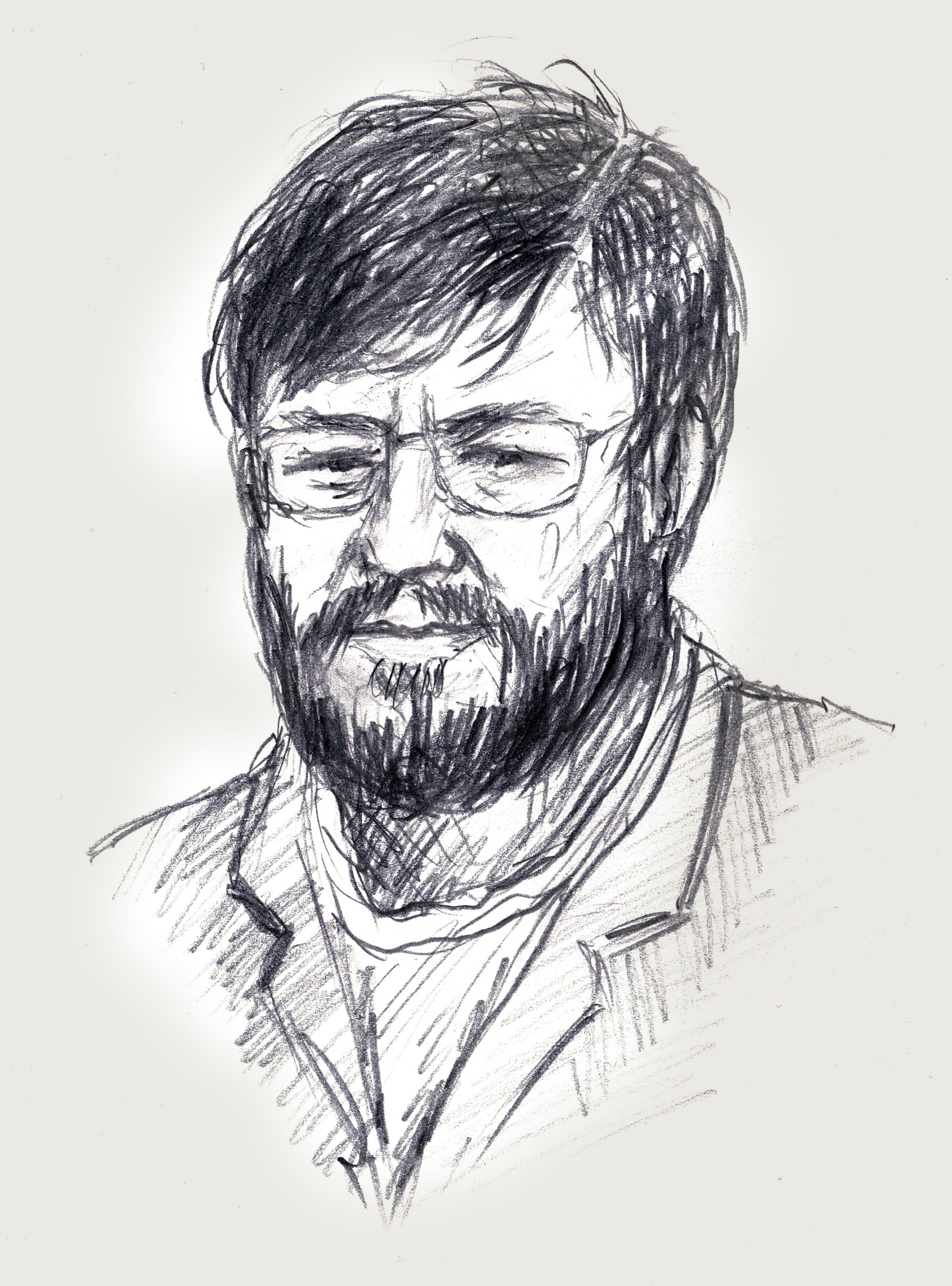
- Pencil sketch of Marc Dutroux
- Born: Marc Paul Alain Dutroux; 6 November 1956 (age 70); Ixelles, Brussels, Belgium
- Spouses: Françoise Dubois (1976–1983); Michelle Martin (1989–2003)
- Children: 5
- Status: Imprisoned (solitary confinement)
- Convictions: Child pornography; Child sexual abuse; Kidnapping; Murder; Theft
- Penalty: Life imprisonment
- Accomplices: Michelle Martin; Michel Lelièvre; Michel Nihoul; Bernard Weinstein

Details
- Victims: 4+ murders, 11+ rapes
- Date: 19??–1986, 1995–1996
- Country: Belgium
- Killed: 5
- Date apprehended: 13 August 1996
- Imprisoned at: Prison of Nivelles

Marc Paul Alain Dutroux (French: [maʁk pɔl alɛ̃ dytʁu]; born 6 November 1956) is a Belgian convicted serial killer, serial rapist, and serial child molester. Initially convicted for the abduction and rape of five young girls in 1989, Dutroux was released on parole after just three years' imprisonment. He was arrested again in 1996 on suspicion of having abducted, tortured, and sexually abused six girls aged between 8 and 19, four of whom were killed. Dutroux's widely publicized trial ended with his conviction on all charges in 2004; he was subsequently sentenced to life imprisonment.

Dutroux's accomplices included his wife Michelle Martin, Michel Lelièvre, Michel Nihoul, and Bernard Weinstein. Martin was convicted and sentenced to 30 years in prison, and Lelièvre to 25 years. Nihoul, "a Brussels businessman, pub-owner and familiar face at sex parties", was initially tried as an accomplice to the kidnappings but was acquitted owing to insufficient evidence; he was instead convicted of involvement in a gang that participated in human and drug trafficking, and was sentenced to five years in prison. Weinstein was never tried as he was murdered by Dutroux before being identified as an accomplice.

The lenient result of Dutroux's first prosecution, as well as shortcomings on the part of the police in investigating his murders, caused widespread discontent in Belgium with the country's criminal justice system, resulting in the complete reorganisation of Belgium's law enforcement agencies. In the White March held on 20 October 1996, 300,000 Belgian citizens protested the mishandling of the case.

== Early life ==
Marc Dutroux was born in Ixelles, Brussels, on 6 November 1956 to Victor Dutroux and Jeanine Lauwens. He is the eldest of five children. Dutroux spent part of his early childhood in Burundi, then part of the Belgian Congo, where his father worked as a teacher. After Burundi gained independence in mid-1962, Dutroux's family moved back to Belgium and settled in the village of Obaix in Hainaut Province. Dutroux later reported to have been abused by his mother and father.

In 1972, Dutroux's parents separated and his father left the family home. Shortly after graduating from school, Dutroux left home himself and made his living as an electrician. Several years later, in 1976, Dutroux married Françoise Dubois, with whom he had two children. The marriage was marred by Dutroux's abusive behaviour towards his family; the couple would divorce in 1983, with Françoise keeping custody of the children.

== Early criminal activity (1979–1989) ==
During the late 1970s, Dutroux found new employment as a scrap dealer and supplemented his income by stealing car parts. From 1979 onward he was convicted for a variety of petty offences including assault, drug dealing, and trading stolen vehicles. Meanwhile, he regularly visited ice skating rinks in Charleroi, Forest, and Montignies-sur-Sambre, where he would deliberately trip or bump into young female skaters in order to touch them. In October 1980, Dutroux visited a Charleroi skating rink and got into a physical altercation with another patron, Armand de Beyn, after repeatedly colliding with De Beyn's girlfriend. A court case ended with De Beyn being convicted of assault and battery against Dutroux, although Dutroux was banned from the Charleroi skating rink.

He later married Michelle Martin, with whom he had three more children.

=== Initial rapes (1985–1989) ===
On 7 June 1985, the first proven abduction by the two took place, the abduction of eleven-year-old Sylvie D. On 17 October 1985 the pair abducted Maria V., 19, from Peronnes-lez-Binche. Maria V. also identified a third man who took part in her abduction and appeared to be in his fifties. This man was never found by police.

On 14 December 1985, Dutroux abducted Axelle D. During her testimony, she told the police that Dutroux's accomplice Peteghem had told her that "he was part of a gang" led by two gang leaders, "an Italian and a crazy stupid one." Jean van Peteghem admitted to having taken part in the abduction. He said he had abducted Axelle D. with Marc Dutroux and Michelle Martin. He had lived with Dutroux after being discharged from the military and having his marriage fail.

Peteghem told police that his and Dutroux's first victims were two girls from Morlanwelz. These two victims were never located by police.

On 18 December 1985, Dutroux abducted Élisabeth G., 15, in Pont-à-Celles. Peteghem told police that Dutroux filmed Élisabeth naked and took pictures of her. On 17 January 1986, Catherine B., aged 18, was abducted from Obaix in Hainaut Province. Dutroux had one or two accomplices in her abduction who were never found by police. Peteghem was stationed as army personnel in Germany during that time and could not have assisted Dutroux.

On 4 February 1986, Martin, Dutroux and Peteghem were arrested. This had to a large extent been due to Peteghem giving out a lot of information about himself in conversations with the girls, which had been enough for police to identify him. The three were eventually convicted on 26 April 1989. Dutroux received 13 1/2 years. Peteghem received 6 1/2 years and Martin received 5 years. Dutroux received a harsher sentence because he had also committed several robberies with Peteghem. Dutroux was thus additionally convicted for the brutal robbery of a 58-year-old woman. The robbery was also committed with accomplices. One of the accomplices in this robbery was also never found by police.

The early release of Dutroux was granted by Melchior Wathelet, who was at that time the Belgian minister of justice; Dutroux's release was ordered against the advice of both the public prosecutor and the psychiatrist who had examined him in prison, who stated that Dutroux remained extremely dangerous.

=== Granting Dutroux state assistance, sleeping pills and sedatives ===
While in jail, Dutroux managed to convince a health professional that he was disabled due to mental illnesses. That way, he was able to collect public assistance consisting of $1,200 a month from the Belgian government. He also convinced the professionals that he needed sedatives for sleeping problems. Dutroux later went on to use them to sedate his victims. He owned seven small houses, most of them vacant, and used three of them for the torture of the girls he kidnapped. Although he owned several houses, his state assistance stipend was not reduced. In his residence in Marcinelle, he constructed a concealed dungeon in the basement. Dutroux has been described by psychiatrists who examined him for trial as a psychopath.

== Crimes after release ==
On 24 June 1995, eight-year-old classmates Julie Lejeune and Mélissa Russo were kidnapped after going for a walk in Grâce-Hollogne, probably by Dutroux, and taken to his house in Marcinelle. Dutroux kept them imprisoned in the dungeon he had created, repeatedly sexually abused them and produced child pornography videos of the abuse. Two months later, in the early hours of 23 August in Ostend, Dutroux and accomplice Michel Lelièvre kidnapped An Marchal and Eefje Lambrecks, two teenage girls from Hasselt who were on their way back to their holiday home in Westende following a night out in Blankenberge. With Lejeune and Russo already in the dungeon, Lambrecks and Marchal were kept in chains in a bedroom. In September, according to Martin, Lambrecks and Marchal were drugged and brought to Jumet, where Dutroux and accomplice Bernard Weinstein killed them by burying them alive.

Around the time of Lambrecks's and Marchal's deaths, Weinstein and a man named Philippe Divers stole a van and hid it in a hangar; after it was found there by the hangar's owner, it was taken away by the police. Dutroux and Weinstein suspected that Divers and his friend Pierre Rochow had betrayed them, and on the night of 4 November, wishing to interrogate them about the van, Dutroux and Weinstein lured Divers and Rochow into Weinstein's home in Jumet and drugged and sequestered them, before leaving to go to Rochow's house to search for clues about the van. There they found Rochow's girlfriend, Bénédicte Jadot, whom they took with them back to Jumet and questioned, before leaving again to pick up another person. While they were away, Jadot escaped and alerted a neighbour, who called the police. With Weinstein wanted by police, Dutroux decided to kill him to prevent his capture. He kidnapped Weinstein and held him in the dungeon at his house in Marcinelle between 13 and 20 November. During this time, he let Lejeune and Russo roam freely around the house. After feeding him food laced with Rohypnol, Dutroux placed hose clamps around Weinstein's testicles until Weinstein told him where his money was hidden. Dutroux then buried Weinstein alive on his (Dutroux's) property in Sars-la-Buissière. On 6 December 1995, Dutroux, having been recognised by Rochow, was arrested for vehicle theft.

Bernard Weinstein was murdered by Dutroux in November 1995.

According to Dutroux and Martin, Lejeune and Russo were still alive in the house at the time of Dutroux's arrest in December 1995, and Dutroux had ordered Martin to leave new food and water for the girls in the dungeon each time they ran out. Martin neglected to feed them, later claiming she was too afraid to go into the dungeon. Lejeune and Russo eventually starved to death. Dutroux initially stated that they were still alive when he returned home following his release from prison on 20 March 1996; according to him, Lejeune died that day, and Russo followed suit four days later despite his efforts to save her; during his trial, he said they were already dead when he returned from prison. An expert asserted that they would not have been able to survive the entire time Dutroux was in prison on the total amount of food and water they were said to have been given. Dutroux buried Lejeune and Russo's bodies in the garden of the house he owned in Sars-la-Buissière, near that of Weinstein.

On the morning of 28 May 1996, Dutroux and Lelièvre kidnapped 12-year-old Sabine Dardenne, who was cycling to school in Tournai. In a book originally published under the title J'avais 12 ans, j'ai pris mon vélo et je suis partie à l'école (and published in the United Kingdom under the title I Choose to Live), Dardenne described her time in captivity in Dutroux's Marcinelle home, where she spent most of the time imprisoned in the dungeon and was starved and repeatedly raped by Dutroux. On 9 August 1996, Dutroux and Lelièvre kidnapped 14-year-old Laëtitia Delhez as she was walking home from her local swimming pool in Bertrix. An eyewitness, Benoit Tinant, who greatly helped the search and thus Dutroux's arrest, observed Dutroux's van, described it and was able to identify part of the license plate. On 13 August 1996, Dutroux, Martin and Lelièvre were arrested. An initial search of Dutroux's houses proved inconclusive, but two days later, Dutroux and Lelièvre both made confessions. That same day, Dutroux led the police to the basement dungeon inside which Dardenne and Delhez were imprisoned; the girls were subsequently rescued. On 17 August 1996, Dutroux led police to his house in Sars-la-Buissière and, with his help, they were able to locate and exhume the bodies of Lejeune, Russo and Weinstein. On 3 September, the remains of Marchal and Lambrecks were located and exhumed in Jumet. Hundreds of commercial adult pornographic videos, along with a large number of home-made sex films that Dutroux had made with Martin, were recovered from his properties.

== Errors during investigation ==
Heavy criticism was levelled against the police for their handling of the case. In 1995, Dutroux's mother wrote a letter to the authorities stating that she knew that Dutroux had kidnapped two girls and was keeping them at his house. After Lejeune and Russo were kidnapped in June 1995, it took police 14 months to arrest Dutroux, although he had been a prime suspect from the start, having committed similar crimes before. During the search for Lejeune and Russo, police visited Dutroux's house, where Lejeune and Russo were held, twice, on 13 and 19 December 1995 without finding them. During the course of the searches, girls' voices were heard while searching the cellar, but police did not follow up to find the source of the voices. Detectives accepted Dutroux's claim that the ongoing construction in his house was for a new drainage system, rather than for the new cells he was creating. Several videotapes found during the search were never looked at. Some of them showed Dutroux constructing the dungeon in which Lejeune and Russo were held. Michel Bourlet, who was appointed lead investigator, said that some of the videotapes had disappeared and that he wanted to have them all recovered and reviewed. The officer conducting the search was later promoted.

In October 1996, judge Jean-Marc Connerotte was removed from the investigation by the Supreme Court due to concerns about his impartiality after he attended a fund-raising dinner for the victims' families. Another judge, Jean-Claude Van Espen, resigned after his close relationship with Michel Nihoul came to light.

On 23 April 1998, Dutroux was allowed to view his case files. He was accompanied by two police officers. When one officer went on a break, Dutroux overpowered the other officer and was able to escape. He was captured a few hours later. The Minister of Justice, Stefaan De Clerck, the Minister of the Interior, Johan Vande Lanotte, and the police chief resigned as a result. In 2000, Dutroux received a five-year sentence for threatening a police officer during his escape. In 2002, he received another five-year sentence for unrelated crimes.

There were countless hairs found in the dungeon where the two girls were held. Judge Langlois refused to have them tested for DNA evidence even though the leading police investigator, Michel Bourlet, had begged him to have them analyzed in order to know whether more people besides Dutroux were involved. The general prosecutor of the case, Anne Thily told investigative journalist Olenka Frenkiel that all hairs had been tested, though Frenkiel claimed to have heard from sources saying otherwise, writing, "How can such a senior figure lie so brazenly?"

At least seven members of law enforcement were arrested on suspicion of having ties to Marc Dutroux. One of them was Georges Zico, a police detective believed to be an associate of Dutroux. According to prosecutor Michel Bourlet, Zico was charged with truck theft, document forgery and insurance fraud.

Eventually several families of victims boycotted the official trial, stating that it was a circus and there had been no progress in the case since the removal of judge Connerotte.

The investigation was also complicated by rivalry between different law enforcement bodies. Both the Gendarmerie and the Judicial Police carried out their own investigations, and both groups wanted to be the first to solve the case. In particular, the Gendarmerie refused to share tip-offs and information with the Judicial Police: most notably one from an informer that named Dutroux as a suspect and even described a hidden space that Dutroux had constructed in the basement of one of the houses he owned.

=== Statements by Senator Anne-Marie Lizin ===
Belgian Senator Anne-Marie Lizin commented on the case, saying: "Stupidity (by the police) can't be the only explanation. It's a question of stupidity, incompetence and corruption. Dutroux must be a friend of somebody important. Or else he was being protected because he was known to be a police informant." Lizin said Dutroux was not a true pedophile, as he has been portrayed. He had a record of dealing in stolen cars, selling arms to hoodlums and trafficking in prostitution. "When he discovered that men paid a lot more for little girls for prostitution, he started kidnapping them," she said. When Dutroux finally was arrested, police found in his house video films of him raping little girls. They said he did this so he could sell the films to pedophiles.

=== Attempts to have access to Dutroux Dossier from WikiLeaks blocked in Belgium ===
In 2009, WikiLeaks published the Dutroux Dossier. Belgian authorities tried to have the dossier taken down. The prosecutor general of Liege, Cedric Visart de Bocarme, said, "There is some true, some false, some very disparate information here, involving some people who have done nothing wrong, who have simply been mentioned in an investigation and are thus exposed to public contempt, whereas all this material should have remained classified."

== Parliamentary investigation ==
A 17-month inquiry by a parliamentary commission into the Dutroux affair produced a report in February 1998, which concluded that while Dutroux did not have accomplices in high positions in the police and justice systems, as he continued to claim, he profited from corruption, sloppiness and incompetence. Marc Verwilghen, the chairman of the inquiry sharply criticized every aspect of the investigation.

== Public outcry ==
In October 1996, more than 300,000 Belgians marched through the streets of Brussels after judge Jean-Marc Connerotte was removed from the case. He was removed for attending a fundraising dinner for the families of the victims, which the court system claimed damaged his impartiality. They demanded an investigation and reform of the police and justice system. The protest was called the "White March". Protesters were wearing signs that said "Stop the cover-up".

To protest the prospect of a conditional release of Dutroux, a "Black March" was organised on the 23rd anniversary of the "White March". The calls to take part in the march were made after it was made public that a court had approved the request for conditional release of Michel Lelièvre, who was an accomplice of Dutroux and had received a 25-year sentence.

The Guardian reported in 2004 that "the entire credibility of the current reformist government of Guy Verhofstadt and Belgium's very reputation as a normal civilised country is on the line."

The crimes of Marc Dutroux were covered in multiple nonfiction documentaries, one of the earliest being a British public-access TV documentary titled Witness: The Lost Children (Channel 4, 1999, directed by Helen Hill), which was narrated by Stephen Rashbrook and featured interviews with multiple family members of the victims, as well as with Claude Thirault, a next-door neighbour of Dutroux's who had later become a police informant after raising personal suspicions about Dutroux's activities, which had included watching small children from the street, and also being caught digging up under water tanks in an old basement, creating a space where Thirault claimed that Dutroux had planned to use for hiding children in. An episode of Crimes That Shook the World titled "Monster of Belgium" (Season 2, Episode 9, April 2009) was aired later on by Discovery Channel, bringing North American attention to the Belgium case.

== Trial ==
Dutroux's trial began on 1 March 2004, some seven and a half years after his initial arrest. It was a trial by jury and up to 450 people were called upon to testify. The trial took place in Arlon, the capital of the Belgian province of Luxembourg, where the investigations had started. Dutroux was tried for the murders of An Marchal, Eefje Lambrecks and Bernard Weinstein. Dutroux was also charged with a host of other crimes: auto theft, abduction, attempted murder and attempted abduction, molestation, and three unrelated rapes of women from Slovakia.

The defendants of the trial, left to right, Marc Dutroux, Michel Lelièvre, Michelle Martin, and Jean-Michel Nihoul.

Martin was tried as an accomplice, as were Lelièvre and Michel Nihoul. To protect the accused, they were made to sit in a glass cage during the trial. In the first week of the trial, photos of Dutroux's face were not allowed to be printed in Belgian newspapers for privacy reasons; this ban remained in force until 9 March.

In a rare move, the jury at the assizes trial publicly protested the presiding judge Stéphane Goux's handling of the debates and the victims' testimonies. On 14 June 2004, after three months of trial, the jury went into seclusion to reach their verdicts on Dutroux and the three other accused. Verdicts were returned on 17 June 2004 after three days of deliberation. Dutroux, Martin and Lelièvre were found guilty on all charges; the jury were unable to reach a verdict on Nihoul's role.

=== Dutroux's testimony ===
Dutroux claimed that he was a low ranking member in a powerful pedophile network. He further claimed that Michel Nihoul was the organizer of their abductions. While admitting some abductions, he denied being a murderer, although he had earlier confessed to killing Weinstein. He said that he did torture and abuse all of the girls but denied killing any of them until the very end. Dutroux further denied kidnapping, raping and murdering Julie Lejeune and Mélissa Russo. However, he admitted to incarcerating them at one of his houses. In the case of Lejeune and Russo, Dutroux also claimed that he had "protected them from a powerful and sinister child sex ring." His testimony that he never raped Lejeune and Russo was somewhat supported by examinations by psychiatrists in 1996, which stated that Dutroux did not fit the paedophile profile. He was not attracted to children, but he might have chosen to abduct younger victims because they were easier to manipulate and control. Dutroux admitted to the abduction and rape of the other girls. He also admitted to burying his accomplice, Bernard Weinstein, alive for "letting the girls die." Dutroux further said that two unidentified policemen had taken part with him in the kidnapping of An Marchal and Eefje Lambrecks. He boasted about having built the dungeon in which Marchal and Lambrecks were held for a while. He said: "I wanted to create a hiding place to spare them from being sent to a prostitution ring." Dutroux admitted to raping Lambrecks. He said that Weinstein had raped Marchal. He also admitted to drugging both of them. Dutroux also admitted that he kidnapped Sabine Dardenne and raped her. He admitted to kidnapping and raping Laetitia Delhez but not handing them over to Nihoul "to spare them the fate of An and Eefje." Dutroux's lawyer, Xavier Magnee, repeatedly said that the prosecution never followed up on evidence of a network surrounding Dutroux.

=== Michelle Martin's testimony ===
Martin testified that Dutroux and Weinstein kidnapped Lejeune and Russo. She also said that Dutroux had told her that he had murdered Weinstein. Martin further said that Dutroux and Weinstein had killed Marchal and Lambrecks. She further testified that Lejeune and Russo starved to death in their basement in 1996 while Dutroux was in jail. She claims that she was too scared to descend to the basement.

Martin said that Dutroux had already decided to abduct girls in 1985. He had said that it was easier to abduct and rape girls than to start affairs with them. This way he would also have more resources and time to spend on her. So she had to help him with the abductions.

=== Sentencing ===
The death penalty was abolished in Belgium in 1996. The last execution for common-law crimes was in 1918. However, the majority of Belgians, at the time of the trial, would have supported Dutroux receiving the death penalty. On 22 June 2004, Dutroux received the maximum sentence of life imprisonment, while Martin received 30 years and Lelièvre 25 years. The jury was asked to go back into seclusion to decide whether or not Nihoul was an accomplice.

On 23 June, Dutroux lodged an appeal against his sentence.

Although Nihoul was acquitted of kidnapping and conspiracy charges, he was convicted on drug-related charges and was sentenced to five years' imprisonment. Nihoul was released in the spring of 2006. He resided in Zeebrugge until his death on 23 October 2019.

On 19 August 2012, about 2,000 people in Brussels demonstrated against Martin's possible early release from prison. She has since been paroled, 16 years into her sentence, and was released into the care of the Poor Clares in Malonne. She was given shelter, although she was not part of the community. The sisters have declared that they were not her guardian and shelter was given under the condition that she would not violate the conditions of her parole. As the convent has since been sold, she has had to find new shelter or go back to prison. A former judge has created an apartment in his converted farmhouse, where she now lives.

On 4 February 2013, Dutroux requested the court in Brussels for an early release from prison. He insisted that he was "no longer dangerous" and wanted to be released into house arrest with an electronic tag (ankle bracelet) placed upon him. On 18 February, the court denied his request. Dutroux is currently being held in solitary confinement in the prison of Nivelles.

In October 2019, Dutroux won the pre-parole right to a psychiatric assessment, which was supposed to take place in May 2020 but was delayed due to the COVID-19 pandemic.

Name of suspect	Profile	Charged with	Convicted of	Sentence	Release
Marc Dutroux	Unemployed electrician, convicted child kidnapper and rapist	Murder (of An and Eefje as well as Bernard Weinstein), rape, kidnapping (of six girls), conspiracy, drug offenses	Murder (of An and Eefje as well as Bernard Weinstein), rape, kidnapping (of six girls), conspiracy, drug offenses	Life in prison	Eligible for early release after 30 years in 2021
Michelle Martin	Housewife	Kidnapping, murder of Julie and Mélissa	Convicted of letting Julie and Mélissa starve to death and assisting in the kidnappings	30 years' imprisonment	Released under conditions in 2012 after serving 16 of the 30 years
Michel Nihoul	Businessman	Kidnapping, conspiracy, gang formation, document fraud, drug trafficking, car smuggling	Acquitted of kidnapping, document fraud, trading of stolen vehicles	5 years' imprisonment	Was released early in May 2006 under conditions
Michel Lelièvre	Drug addict and petty thief	Kidnapping, rape, murder	Kidnapping of An, Eefje, Sabine and Laetitia and rape	25 years' imprisonment	Was released under conditions in October 2019

=== Michel Nihoul ===
Michel Nihoul was a businessman known to frequently attend sex parties. He was accused of being the brains behind the child kidnapping and abuse operation around Dutroux. Nihoul's lawyer in the case, Frederic Clement de Clety, denied all charges made against Nihoul by Dutroux and called him a "liar and manipulator." When the investigative journalist Olenka Frenkiel met Nihoul in Brussels, he reportedly greeted her with the words "I am the monster of Belgium." He told her that he was certain that he would never be prosecuted. During the encounter, he grabbed her, tickled her and pulled her onto him so that she called for her colleagues to help her get away from him. Frenkiel was working on a documentary on the case for the BBC. In 2004, at the end of the Dutroux case trial, he was released of all charges of child abduction. In May 2010, the Belgian prosecutor's office dropped all charges against Nihoul relating to participation in a paedophile ring in the absence of any tangible evidence.

=== Judges ===
- Jean-Marc Connerotte (on his initiative two girls were rescued, was removed from the case for attending a fundraising dinner for families)
- Jacques Langlois (investigating magistrate). Dutroux case was his first assignment
- Stephane Goux (judge presiding over verdict)
- Jean-Claude Van Espen (was in charge of the murder investigation of Christine van Hees, resigned from the Dutroux case and the murder investigation around van Hees after his close ties to Michel Nihoul were made public in 1998)

== Imprisonment ==
Dutroux is serving his life sentence at the prison of Nivelles, Belgium. In July 2024, he was accused of accessing child pornography via a mobile phone. During a search of his cell, no cell phone was discovered; however, he did have four envelopes containing photographs of nude women and young girls. As of February 2026, the matter is still under investigation.

== Effects in Belgium ==
The Dutroux case is so infamous that between 1996 and 1998 over a third of Belgians with the surname "Dutroux" applied for a surname change.

== Allegations of wider involvement ==
Belief in a paedophile network which included high-ranking members of the Belgian establishment and a conspiracy to keep it hidden became widespread in Belgium. Press reports claimed that, prior to his removal, Connerotte was on the verge of publicly disclosing the names of high-level government officials who had been recognized on video-tapes. Connerotte had said that the businessman Michel Nihoul was the brains behind the child kidnapping operation, and would testify in the trial that there had been high-level murder plots to stop his investigation. Investigators also believed that Dutroux and Nihoul were planning on a long-distance prostitution trafficking network involving cars and the import of girls from Slovakia, though no evidence of this was ever uncovered.

Dutroux and his fellow accused supported the conspiracy narrative. Michel Lelièvre, the accomplice of Marc Dutroux, said that the two girls, Lejeune and Russo, were kidnapped as an order by a third party. However, while under arrest, Lelièvre stopped cooperating with the authorities. He told police that he had been threatened and could not risk saying any more. Dutroux's lawyer, Xavier Magnée, said during the trial proceedings "I speak not only as a lawyer, but also as a citizen and father. He was not the only devil. Out of the 6000 hair samples that were found in the basement cellar where some of the victims were held, 25 "unknown" DNA profiles were discovered. There were people in that cellar that are not now accused." The prosecution never attempted to match those DNA profiles to people implicated in the case.

Focus was also placed on the material wealth of Dutroux, who owned ten houses. He was in total worth 6 million Belgian francs (US$130,000). While he had all of this wealth in property he also received public assistance of $1,200 a month. Documents released by WikiLeaks show that large sums of money in different currencies arrived in Michelle Martin's bank account, and claimed to be linked in time to the disappearances of the abducted girls. Both the transfers and the value of the six properties that Dutroux owned suggested to investigators that he was financed by a larger paedophile and prostitution ring. The Flemish newspaper Nieuwsblad reported that he had committed health-insurance fund fraud, theft, insurance fraud and investments on the stock market and that these had contributed to his wealth.

An undated letter was found in a house belonging to Bernard Weinstein, mentioning a gift for the "high priestress". The note was signed "Anubis". A member of the Abraxas cult in Charleroi used the same alias, leading police to conduct a raid on the cult headquarters by 150 officers, taking away much of the cult's paraphernalia. No connection to Dutroux was uncovered in the raid, and no evidence that Weinstein had been a satanist or connected to the cult emerged. Stories of human sacrifices and trafficking by the cult were likewise never substantiated.

Much attention was given to the so-called X-files, interviews with witnesses who had answered judge Connerotte's appeal to come forward. Witness X1, Régina Louf, told of parties organised by Nihoul that included forced prostitution and murder. She also claimed to have been present at several unsolved murders of girls in the 1980s, and pointed to Dutroux and Nihoul as culprits. The interviews were led by officer De Baets, who came under criticism for leading the witness. In one case, Louf pointing out the wrong photo of a murder victim was noted as a correct identification, since Louf had exhibited a "non-verbal" reaction to the correct photo. Another identified victim was later determined to have been killed by an unrelated individual. De Baets and his team were removed from the case, and the prosecutors dismissed Louf's statements. In 1997, De Baets was charged with falsifying the statements of Louf, but was exonerated from the charges in 1999.

Three journalists later wrote a book called The X-Files: What Belgium Was Not Supposed to Know About the Dutroux Affair, that claimed that the X witnesses were much more believable than stated by the media. But it also stated that there had been substantial efforts by the magistrates and senior police officials to demolish the testimony of the X-witnesses.

== Confirmed victims of Dutroux ==
- Sylvie D., 11, 17 October 1985, abducted and raped.
- Maria V., 19, 17 October 1985, abducted and raped.
- Élisabeth G., 15, 18 December 1985, abducted and raped. Dutroux took videos and pictures of her.
- Axelle D., 14 December 1985, abducted and raped.
- Catherine B., 18, 17 January 1986, abducted and raped.
- Eva Mackova, 19, July 1994, drugged and raped while on holiday at Dutroux's house in Sars-la-Buissière. Dutroux filmed the acts.
- Yanka Mackova, 17, July 1996, drugged and raped while on holiday at Dutroux's in Sars-la-Buissière. Dutroux filmed the acts.
- Henrieta Palusova, 20, 5 June 1995, abducted and raped in Topoľčany (Slovakia). Dutroux filmed the acts.
- Mélissa Russo, 8, abducted 24 June 1995, imprisoned and raped. Died of starvation and dehydration, found 17 August 1996 in Sars-la-Buissière.
- Julie Lejeune, 8, abducted 24 June 1995, imprisoned and raped. Died of starvation and dehydration, found 17 August 1996 in Sars-la-Buissière.
- An Marchal, 17, abducted 23 August 1995, imprisoned and raped. Killed in Jumet by being buried alive after being wrapped in plastic, found 3 September 1996.
- Eefje Lambrecks, 19, abducted 23 August 1995, imprisoned and raped. Killed in Jumet by being buried alive after being wrapped in plastic, found 3 September 1996.
- Bernard Weinstein, imprisoned, tortured, killed by being buried alive in November 1995.
- Sabine Dardenne, 12, abducted 28 May 1996, imprisoned, chained by neck and raped repeatedly, rescued 15 August 1996.
- Laetitia Delhez, 14, abducted 9 August 1996, imprisoned, chained to a bed and raped repeatedly, rescued six days later.

== Dutroux's houses ==
Marc Dutroux owned seven houses, four of which he used for his kidnappings:

- The house on the Avenue de Philippeville 128 in Marcinelle is most often cited in the media. All victims were held captive here in the basement and bedroom. The municipality of Charleroi seized ownership of this house, because of what happened there and the bad state of the house. In the Belgian procedure of compulsory purchase, an owner has the last right to visit a house. Therefore, Dutroux visited this house on 10 September 2009, under heavy police guard. Demolition of this house started at 6 June 2022. A commemorative garden has been built in its place.
- A house in Jumet, that has since been demolished. The remains of An Marchal and Eefje Lambrecks were found buried in the garden of this house. Bernard Weinstein lived in this house for a while. A small monument is placed at this location.
- A house in Rue Jules Destree 17 Marchienne-au-Pont. Dutroux originally wanted to build a cellar here for abducted children, but after a raid by the gendarmerie, he continued in Marchinelle.
- A house in Sars-la-Buissière. The bodies of Lejeune, Russo and Weinstein were found buried in the garden. The house was bought by the municipality of Lobbes in the first months of 2009. It is planned to make a park with a monument commemorating Dutroux's victims here.
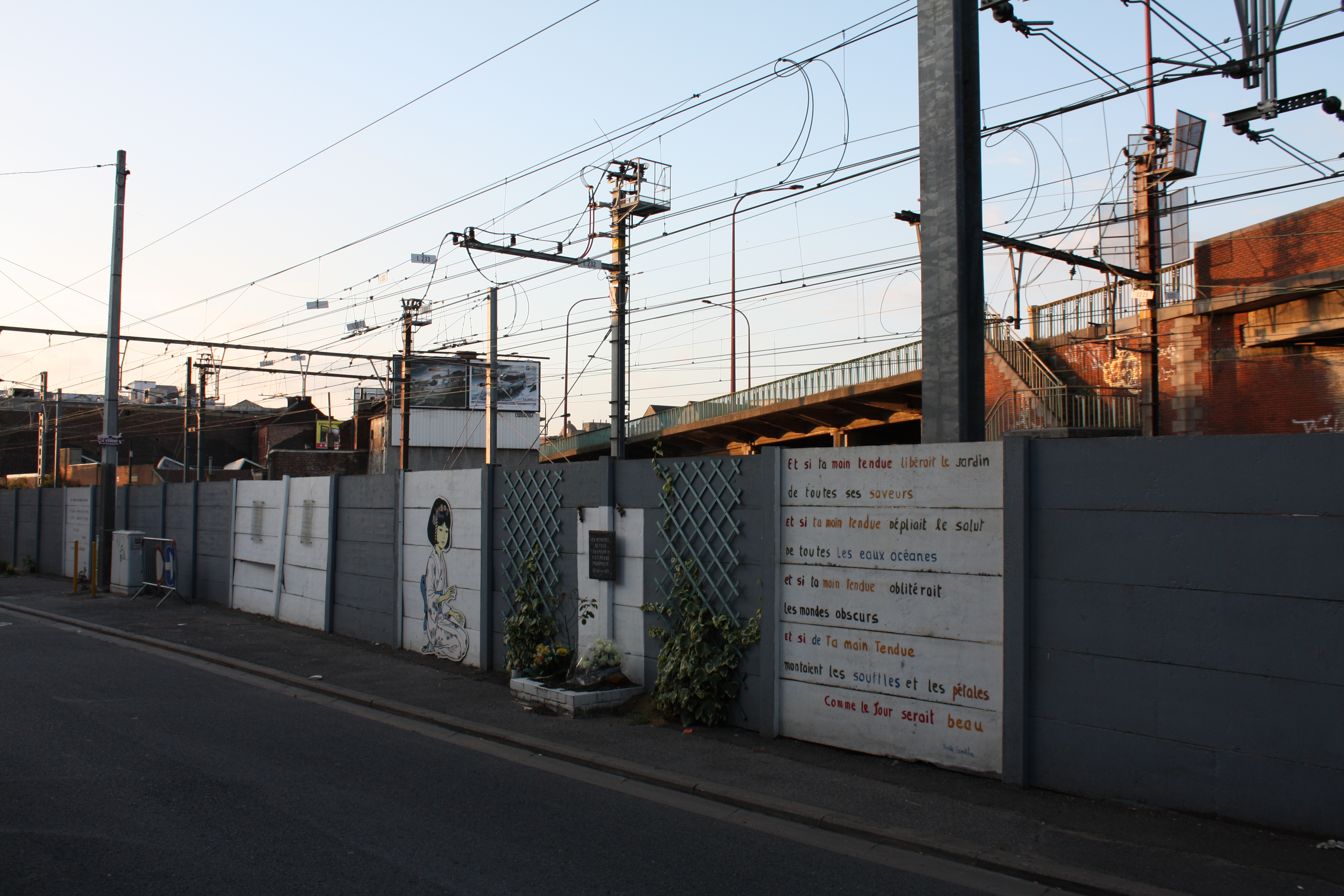
Murals on a wall opposite the house in Marcinelle.

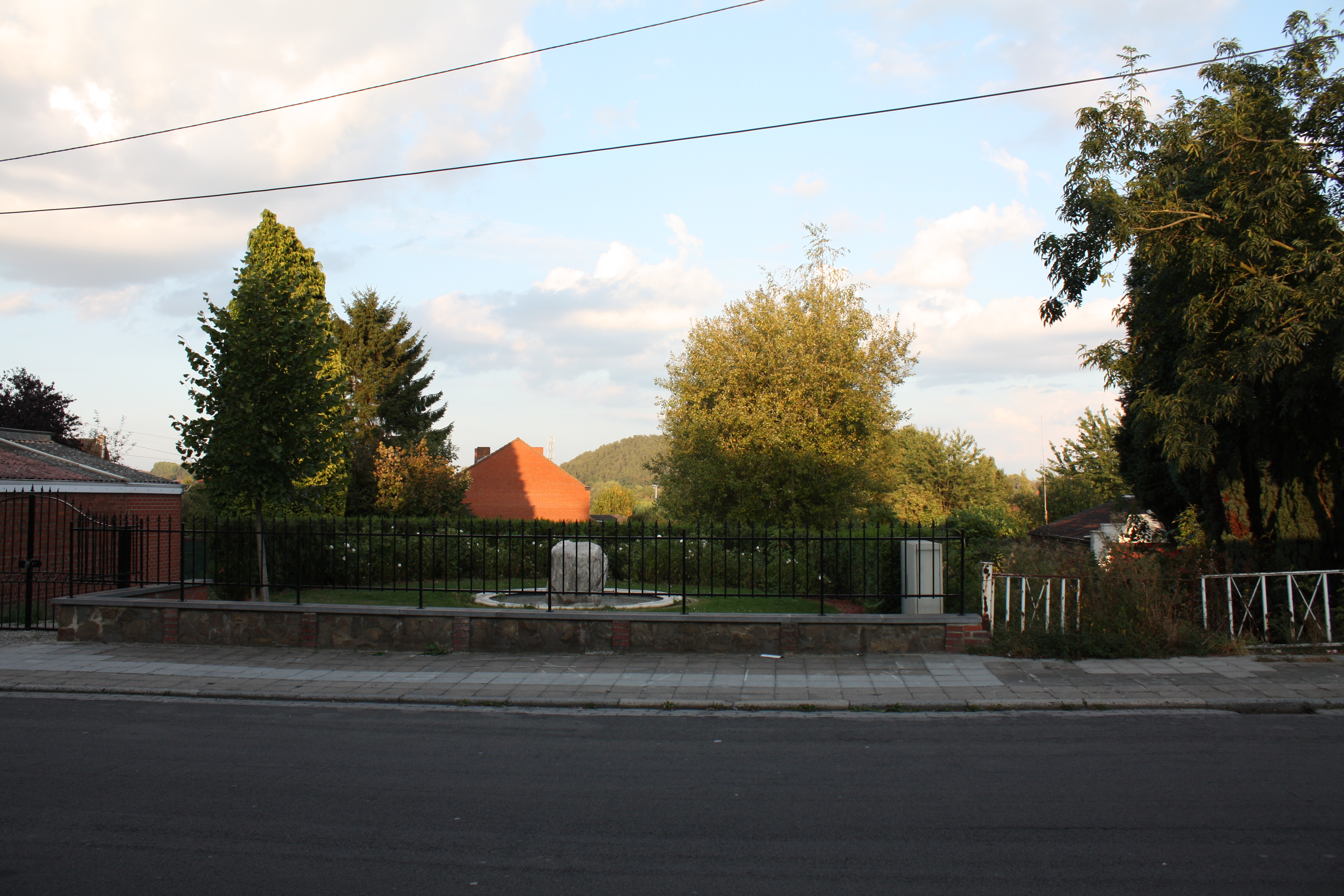
Location of the house of Dutroux in Jumet.

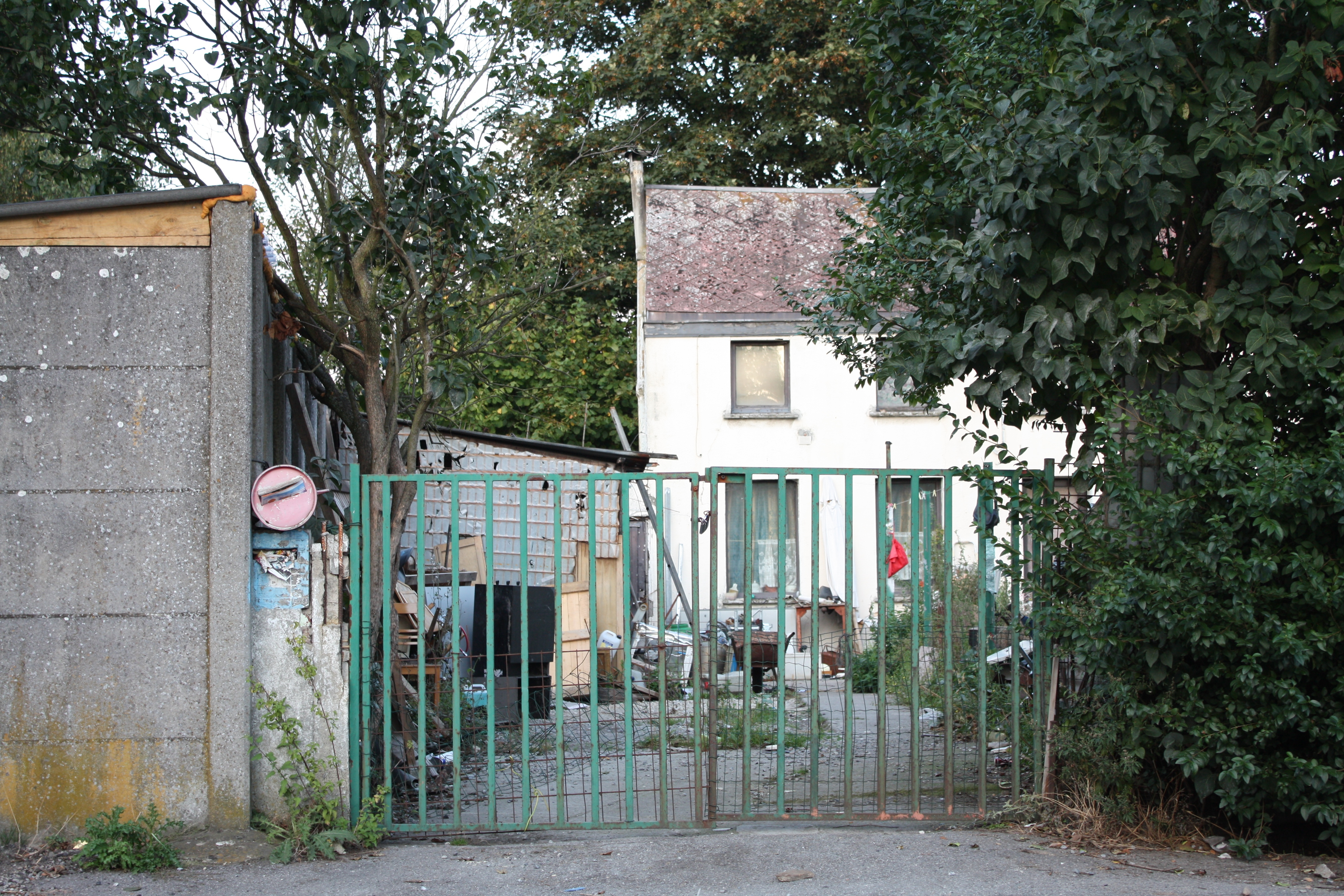
House owned by Dutroux in Marchienne-au-Pont.

== Chronology of the case ==
=== Previous crimes ===
- 26 April 1989 – Marc Dutroux is convicted of the rape of five girls in 1985 and 1986.
- 8 April 1992 – Dutroux, owing to the erstwhile Minister of Justice Melchior Wathelet, is released from prison early where he was serving a 13.5-year sentence.

=== Main crimes and arrests ===
- 24 June 1995 – The eight-year-old girls Julie Lejeune and Mélissa Russo are abducted in Liège.
- 23 August 1995 – The 17-year-old An Marchal and the 19-year-old Eefje Lambrecks are kidnapped in Ostend.
- 25 November 1995 – The 43-year-old Bernard Weinstein, a French companion of Dutroux, is killed by Dutroux (presumably on this date).
- 13 December 1995 – Following tips from witnesses and Dutroux's mother, Chief Guard René Michaux searches Dutroux's house in Marcinelle. Children's voices are heard, but Michaux believes them to be coming from outside.
- 28 May 1996 – 12-year-old Sabine Dardenne is abducted in Kain, Walloon.
- 9 August 1996 – Laetitia Delhez, 14, is abducted in Bertrix.
- 13 August 1996 – Dutroux, his wife Michelle Martin, and a friend, Michel Lelièvre, are arrested on the basis of witness statements.
- 15 August 1996 – Police discovered Sabine Dardenne and Laetitia Delhez, who were hidden in a cell in the basement of Dutroux's house.
- 16 August 1996 – Police arrest Michel Nihoul on suspicion of conspiracy.
- 17 August 1996 – The bodies of Lejeune and Russo are dug up in the garden of a house that Dutroux owns in Sars-la-Buissière. The girls are found to have died of starvation. The corpse of Bernard Weinstein is also discovered in the same garden.
- 18 August 1996 – Dutroux and Lelièvre confess to the kidnapping of Marchal and Lambrecks, but deny that the teenagers were murdered.
- 3 September 1996 – The police find the bodies of Marchal and Lambrecks under a shed at Weinstein's house. The two had been buried alive.

=== Investigation ===
- 21 September 1996 – Jean-Marc Connerotte, the investigating judge in the Dutroux case, marries his girlfriend of 10 years. Together with their son they visit a benefit meeting for the parents of the disappeared children. At the benefit the family has spaghetti, and Connerotte sits with Michel Bourlet, the attorney at Neufchâteau. Connerotte stays for only an hour and does not speak to Sabine Dardenne. The magistrates receive a fountain pen worth €27 each and their wives a bouquet of flowers.
- 15 October 1996 – The so-called "spaghetti judgement" (French: arrêt spaghetti): the Court of Cassation removes Connerotte for attending the benefit and receiving two gifts there (a plate of spaghetti and a fountain pen).
- 20 October 1996 – The White March. Around 300,000 people demonstrate in Brussels to protest against the delays and errors in the Dutroux investigation.
- 24 October 1996 – Concerned that the Dutroux investigation will be mishandled, the Belgian parliament sets up an independent committee to investigate the Dutroux case and the possible procedural errors committed by the Belgian police and judicial authorities. Marc Verwilghen acts as the chairman.
- 15 March 1997 – The Dutroux Commission delivers scathing criticism at the police and the Ministry of Justice for miscarrying their investigation into the missing girls.
- 6 May 1997 – The Dutroux Commission returns to work and investigates whether Dutroux was protected by people in positions of power.
- 15 February 1998 – The committee's second report states that the Dutroux gang did not enjoy protection, but benefited from corruption, carelessness, and a lack of professionalism.
- 23 April 1998 – Dutroux escapes from the Neufchâteau courthouse but is apprehended again four hours later in Herbeumont Saint-Médard by ranger Stéphane Michaux. Interior Minister Johan Vande Lanotte and Minister of Justice Stefaan De Clerck offer their resignations on the same day and are succeeded by Louis Tobback and Tony Van Parys, respectively. The head of the government service, Willy Deridder, also resigns.
- 14 July 1999 – Hubert Massa, Advocate General in charge of the Dutroux case, commits suicide.
- 15 December 1999 – Michel Nihoul is released conditionally due to a lack of evidence.
- 15 March 2002 – Investigative Judge Jacques Langlois completes the investigation into the Dutroux case.
- 17 January 2003 – The Council Chamber in Neufchâteau decides to bring Dutroux, Martin and Lelièvre before the Court of Assizes. Nihoul is excluded from prosecution. Public prosecutor Bourlet and some civil parties file an appeal.
- 30 April 2003 – The Liège Chamber of Indictment (AI) follows Attorney Bourlet and also refers Nihoul to the Court of Assizes.
- 8 December 2003 – Attorney Bourlet files the 27-page indictment.

=== Trial ===
- 1 March 2004 – The Dutroux trial starts in Arlon.
- 14 June 2004 – After 56 litigation days, the twelve members of the jury withdraw to consider the guilt or innocence of the suspects.
- 17 June 2004 – Dutroux is found guilty of several murders.
- 22 June 2004 – Dutroux is sentenced to life imprisonment. Michelle Martin is sentenced to 30 years in prison and Michel Lelièvre to 25 years. Michel Nihoul is convicted to 5 years on drug-related charges. Dutroux appeals to cassation.
- 16 December 2004 – The Court of Cassation finds that no procedural errors were made. The penalties continue to apply.
- October 2005 – Lelièvre asks for the first time to be released conditionally. The request is denied because he has not yet reimbursed his victims.
- May 2006 – Michel Nihoul is released under conditions.
- 2007 – The Belgian state is ordered by the European Court of Human Rights to pay €6,000 in damages to Lelièvre, because his pre-trial detention had lasted for unreasonably long. Like Marc Dutroux and Michelle Martin, Lelièvre had been in jail for almost eight years before he was convicted in 2004. The money is given to his victims.
- April 2007 – Michelle Martin submits a request for conditional release, in application of the Lejeune Act. This is rejected in light of the seriousness of the facts, the lack of probation prospects and the risks associated with the psychological profile of the convicted person.
- October 2008 – Martin submits a second application, which is rejected.
- November 2009 – Martin submits a third application, which is rejected.
- 8 May 2011 – Martin, after serving half of her sentence, obtains conditional release. However, the associated conditions are not met by mid-June 2011, and Martin is not released.
- April 2012 – Dutroux requests penal leave, which would allow him to stay outside the prison for one day and one night every month (this can be done at the earliest one year before serving one-third of his sentence). The prison management denies the request.

=== Releases ===
- 31 July 2012 – The criminal court once again decides to release Michelle Martin conditionally. The monastery of the Poor Klaren in Malonne is prepared to receive her. However, the Public Prosecution Service appeals to cassation, and Martin's release leads to protests.
- 19 August 2012 – The families of Julie Lejeune and An Marchal, together with Laetitia Delhez, organize a demonstration against Martin's release with 5,000 participants. After the event, they are received by the Minister of Justice Annemie Turtelboom, the Minister of Internal Affairs Joëlle Milquet, and a week later by the Prime Minister Elio Di Rupo.
- 28 August 2012 – The Supreme Court rules that no procedural errors had been found in the decision of the criminal court. A few hours later Martin leaves the prison for the monastery in Malonne.
- 6 September 2012 – Following the protests against the release of Martin, the government summit finalizes the coalition agreement, which includes a tightening of the conditional release.
- 13 September 2012 – Dutroux applies to be released with an ankle strap (which can be permitted six months prior to the first appearance before the criminal court). According to Ronny Baudewijn, Dutroux's lawyer, he had spent hours discussing repentance and regret with him, which Dutroux appears to lack. Dutroux finds it regrettable that people have died, but does not feel guilty. As a psychopath, he cannot empathize with others and only sees what he feels he is entitled to, according to Baudewijn.
- April 2013 – Dutroux will have served one-third of his sentence and will be summoned for the first time by the enforcement court (even if he does not take the initiative with a request for a conditional release).
- October 2019 – Michael Lelièvre is released under conditions.
- October 2019 – Dutroux files to have himself examined by psychiatrists. To be allowed conditional release in 2021, three psychiatrists would have to come to the conclusion that the danger of him reoffending is low. In May 2020, Dutroux's pre-parole hearing was delayed by the COVID-19 pandemic.
- October 2020 – Dutroux's lawyer, Bruno Dayez, discloses that Dutroux will not be pursuing parole after an evaluation by three psychiatrists unequivocally opposes his release. The psychiatrists' 90-page report on Dutroux describes him as a "sadistic psychopath who has no remorse for his victims" and a "maximum risk" with a high chance of reoffending.
- 26 August 2022 – Michelle Martin is unconditionally released.

== See also ==
- Jean-Denis Lejeune – Belgian political activist (born 1959)
- Carine Russo – Belgian politician
- Alcàsser Girls – 1992 triple child murder case in Alcàsser, Valencia, Spain
- List of prison escapes
- List of serial killers by country
- Moors murders – 1963–65 serial child killings in England
- Sachsensumpf – Slang name for an unresolved scandal in Saxony
- Death of Katrien De Cuyper – Unsolved homicide in Belgium
- Regina Louf – Belgian victim of organised sexual abuse
- Jimmy Savile – English media personality and sex offender (1926–2011)
- Patrice Alègre – French serial killer and serial rapist
- Jeffrey Epstein – American financier and child sex offender (1953–2019)
- Franklin child prostitution ring allegations – 1988 investigation in Nebraska
- Pizzagate – Debunked conspiracy theory about alleged child sex ring
- QAnon – American conspiracy theory and political movement
