= Death of Katrien De Cuyper =

Unsolved homicide in Belgium

Katrien De Cuyper
- Born: 29 April 1976; Schoten, Antwerp, Flanders, Belgium
- Disappeared: 17 December 1991 (aged 15); IJzerlaan, Antwerp, Flanders, Belgium
- Status: Found dead 19 June 1992
- Cause of death: Strangulation
- Body discovered: Port of Antwerp, Flanders, Belgium
- Resting place: Brasschaat, Flanders, Belgium
- Known for: Homicide victim

On the evening of 17 December 1991, Belgian teenager Katrien De Cuyper (Dutch pronunciation: [kɑˈtrin də ˈkœypər]) disappeared in Antwerp. Six months later, her body was discovered in the port of Antwerp. In 2006, a 35-year-old man from Kessel, who had written to a magazine saying that he was with her on the night she disappeared, was arrested and charged with her kidnapping and murder; he was released four months later due to a lack of evidence. The case remains unsolved.

== Disappearance and body discovery ==
On Tuesday, 17 December 1991, Katrien De Cuyper, a fifteen-year-old girl from Brasschaat, went to visit a friend in Lange Lobroekstraat in Antwerp. After the visit, her friend stayed behind and let her walk to the bus stop alone as it was raining. De Cuyper telephoned her parents at 21:30 to tell them she would take the bus home. She missed the bus and was last seen at 22:45 at Les Routiers café on the IJzerlaan, where she made a phone call to an unknown person. On 19 June 1992, her naked, buried body was discovered during groundwork in the port of Antwerp. Investigation showed that she had been strangled.

== Investigation ==
=== Letters to Blik and Regina Louf confession ===
A month after De Cuyper's body was found, weekly magazine Blik received a letter from an anonymous sender claiming that they had given her a lift after she missed her bus the night she disappeared. The following October, Blik received another letter from the same sender, as did De Cuyper's parents the month after. In February 1997, Regina Louf (also known in Belgium as "Witness X1") wrote a letter to police confessing to killing De Cuyper. Louf said that De Cuyper had been held in a castle north of Antwerp in which children would be raped, tortured and killed by what Louf described as a "paedophile network", and that she had been ordered to kill the teenager during an orgy. No concrete evidence was found to support Louf's testimony.

=== Arrest of K.V.R. ===
In August 2006, a 35-year-old man identified as K.V.R., who had been arrested for stalking, was charged with the kidnapping and murder of De Cuyper. Police searching his house found a box which contained newspaper clippings of articles about De Cuyper's disappearance and murder and copies of the letters sent to Blik and to her parents in 1992. Furthermore, V.R.'s DNA had been found on the stamp on the envelope of one of the letters. In March 2002, his brother had been sentenced to life imprisonment for the murder of his ex-girlfriend's new boyfriend. V.R. admitted that he wrote the letters but said that they were fabricated and that he only wrote them for publicity. In September 2006, De Cuyper's remains were exhumed for further tests.

On 19 December 2006, V.R. was released from custody as the investigation had found no evidence against him other than the letters.

== See also ==
- Cold case
- List of solved missing person cases
- List of satanic ritual abuse allegations
- List of unsolved deaths
- Marc Dutroux
