= Sars-la-Buissière =

Coordinates: 50°20′N 4°12′E

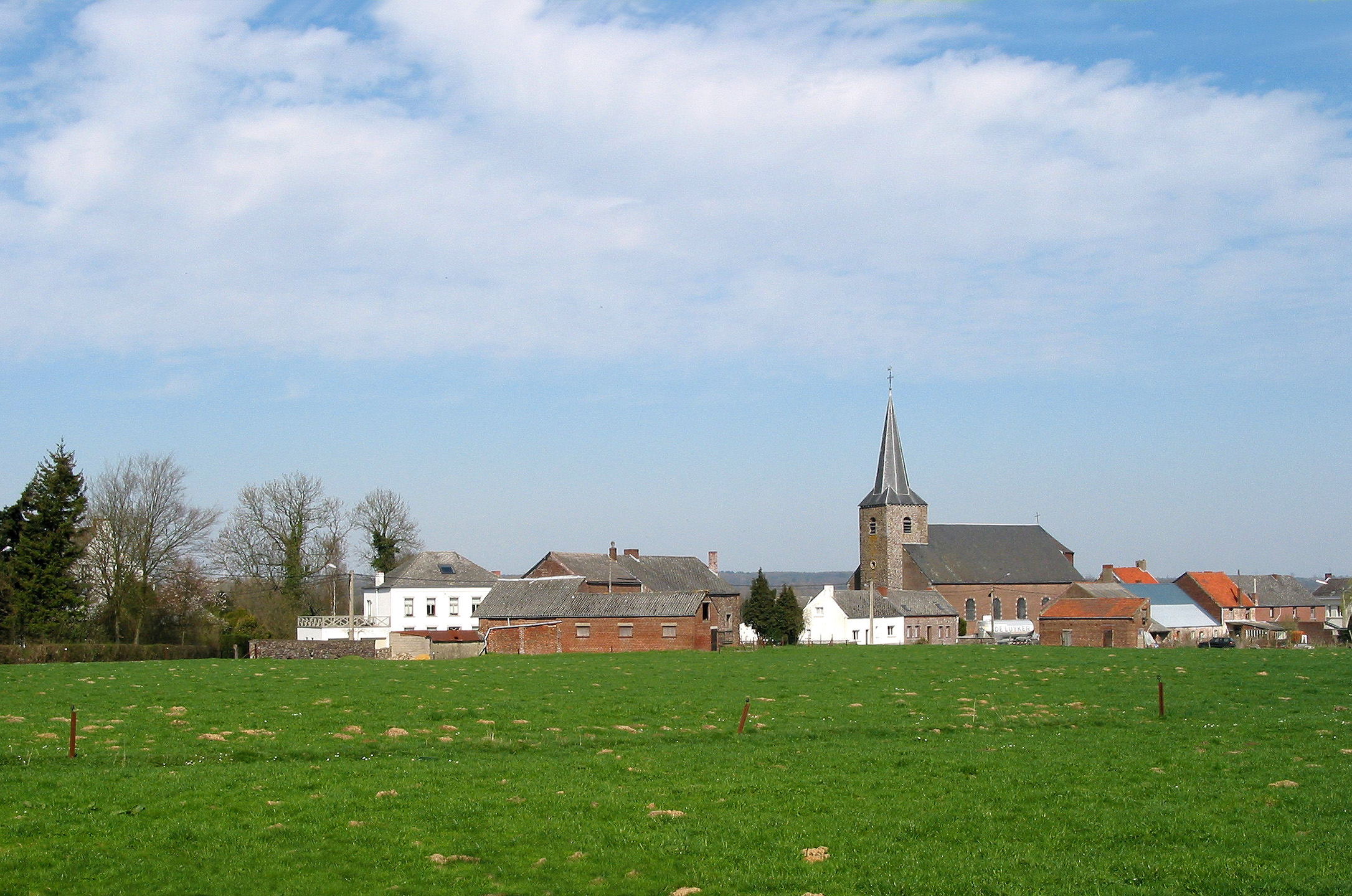
Sars-la-Buissière

Sars-la-Buissière (Walloon: El Sårt-el-Bouxhire) is a village of Wallonia and a district in the municipality of Lobbes, located in the province of Hainaut, Belgium.

== History ==
The village was the site of the discovery of the bodies of three murder victims killed by notorious Belgian serial killer Marc Dutroux.
