= Sabine Dardenne =

Belgian author

- Born: Sabine Anne Renée Ghislaine Dardenne; 28 October 1983 (age 43); Tournai, Belgium
- Disappeared: 28 May 1996 (aged 12); Kain, Tournai, Belgium
- Status: Found alive 15 August 1996 (aged 12)
- Occupation: Author

Sabine Anne Renée Ghislaine Dardenne (born 28 October 1983) is a Belgian author. She was kidnapped at the age of twelve by the child molester and serial killer Marc Dutroux in 1996. Dardenne was one of Dutroux's last two victims. She and fellow captive Laetitia Delhez survived, though the bodies of four other kidnap victims and Dutroux's accomplice were found on the property.

== Kidnapping ==
Dardenne was kidnapped by Dutroux on 28 May 1996, while riding her bicycle to school. Although just twelve years old, Dardenne fought back, pelting Dutroux with questions and demands. He convinced Dardenne that he was her only ally and that her parents had failed to produce the ransom that would save her from fictitious men who wanted to kill her. During her imprisonment in the basement of Dutroux's house, Dutroux allowed Dardenne to write emotional letters to her friends and family, which he never sent despite promises that he would do so. When, after many weeks, she said she wanted one of her friends to visit her, he kidnapped 14-year-old Laetitia Delhez, saying, "Look what I've done for you."

The abduction of Delhez was Dutroux's undoing, since local witnesses in Delhez's hometown had spotted his car and at least one had written down his registration number, which police investigators traced to Dutroux. Dardenne and Delhez were rescued on 15 August 1996, by the Belgian police, two days after Dutroux had been arrested. Dutroux admitted to having abducted and raped them both.

Dardenne's ordeal in the basement of Dutroux's house lasted 80 days, and Delhez spent six days in the basement before both were rescued by authorities. Earlier victims included eight-year-olds Melissa Russo and Julie Lejeune, both of whom died of starvation while Dutroux was in prison for car theft, and seventeen-year-old An Marchal and nineteen-year-old Eefje Lambrechts, both of whom were buried alive under a shed on Dutroux's property. A fifth body, that of his French accomplice, Bernard Weinstein, was found. Dutroux admitted to having drugged Weinstein and burying him alive.

== Trial ==
It took eight years for the case to come to trial. There were numerous problems, including arguments over jurisdiction, legal and procedural mistakes and charges of incompetence and evidence that disappeared. There were also several suicides of people involved with the case including prosecutors, police officers, and witnesses. Communications between Dutch-speaking Flanders and French-speaking Wallonia also fell short.

In October 1996, 350,000 people marched in Brussels to protest against police incompetence in the case. The slow pace of the trial and disturbing revelations of more of Dutroux's victims created public outrage.

During the trial, Dutroux claimed to be a minion of a continent-wide pedophile ring that included prominent individuals and the legal établissements in Belgium. Dardenne and Delhez both testified against Dutroux during his 2004 trial, and their testimony played an important role in his subsequent conviction. They both also asked him why he did what he did to them.

Dardenne's account of her abduction and its aftermath are documented in her memoir J'avais douze ans, j'ai pris mon vélo et je suis partie à l'école ("I was twelve years old, I took my bike and I left for school"), the title was later changed to I Choose To Live during publication. The book has been translated into 14 languages and published in 30 countries. It became a number one bestseller both in continental Europe and the UK.

== Books ==
- I Choose To Live (2005) Virago Press, London (Original title: J'avais 12 ans, j'ai pris mon vélo et je suis partie à l'école)

== See also ==
- List of kidnappings
- List of solved missing person cases (1990s)
