= Paul Pastur =

Belgian lawyer and politician (1866-1938)

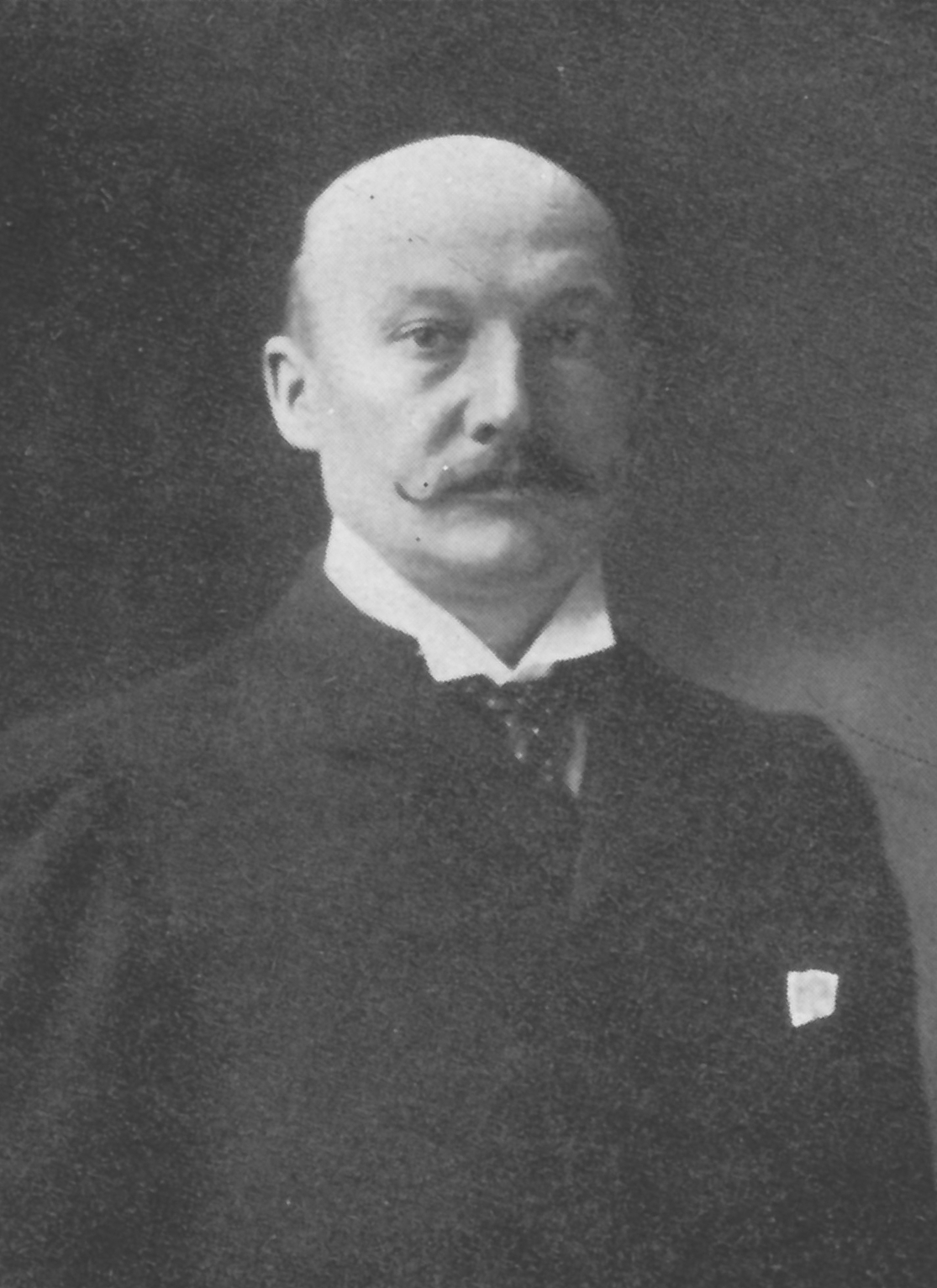

Personal details
- Born: 7 February 1866 Marcinelle, Belgium
- Died: 8 June 1938 (aged 72) Marcinelle, Belgium
- Occupation: Politician; Lawyer; Educator

Paul Pastur (7 February 1866 – 8 June 1938) was a Belgian lawyer and politician from Hainaut. He obtained a law degree of the University of Liège, and started working at the bar of Charleroi in 1893.

== Biography ==
Pastur was born on 7 February 1866 in Marcinelle, Belgium. Impressed by the riots of 1886, he became involved in defending the 27 workmen supposedly implied in the Great Plot. In 1892, together with Jules Destrée, he founded the Democratic Federation. He devoted himself to more egalitarian education and in 1903 he founded the Université du Travail in Charleroi. In 1927, he introduced Mother's Day in Belgium, based on the American example. Paul Pastur was a freemason.

== Death ==
Paul Pastur died on 8 June 1938 in Marcinelle, Belgium.

== Gallery ==
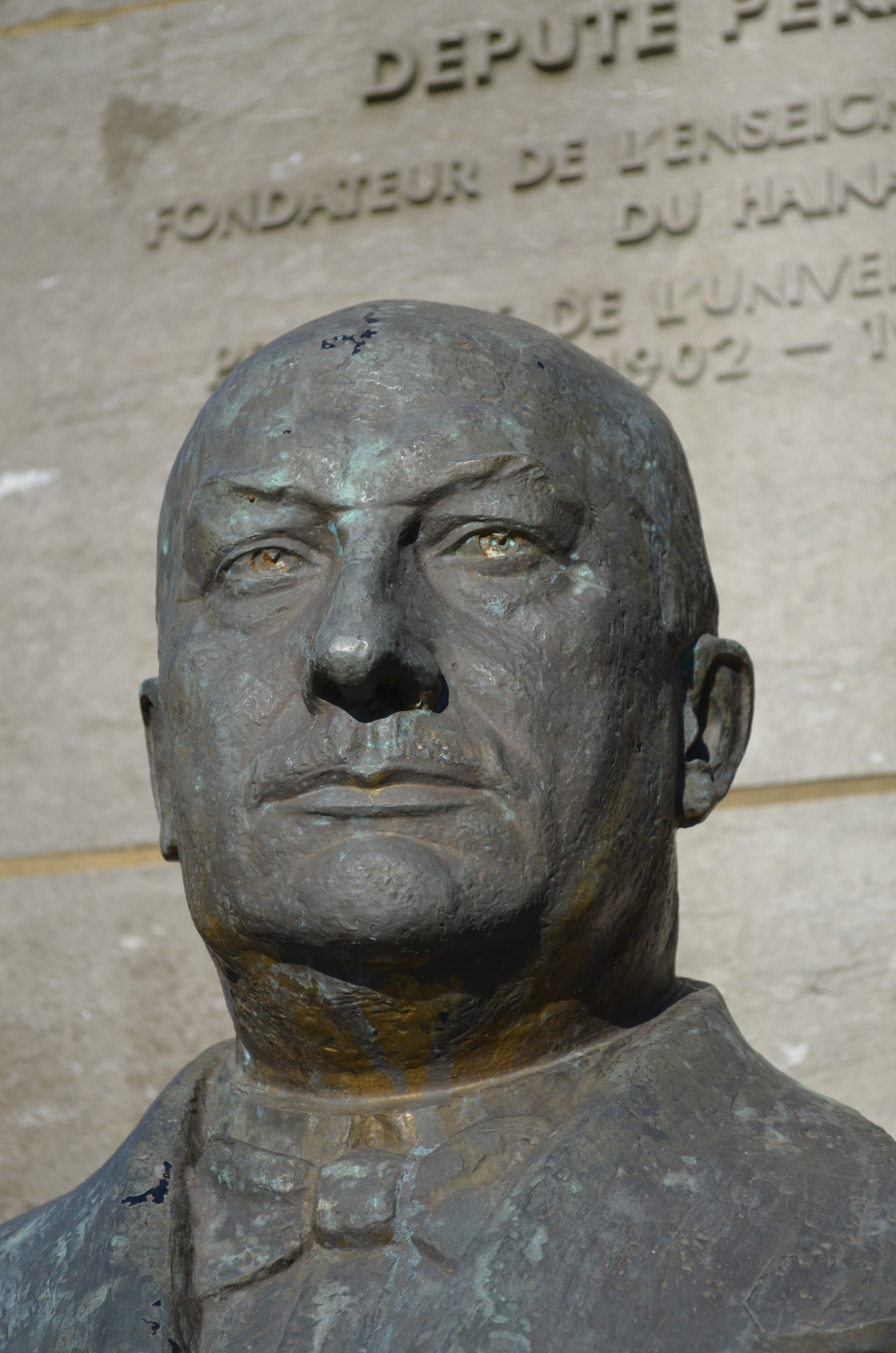
Paul Pastur, statue near the Université du Travail in Charleroi
