= Michel Nihoul =

Belgian felon (1941-2019)

- Mug shot of Nihoul in 1996
- Born: 23 April 1941
- Died: 23 October 2019 (aged 78)
- Occupation: Businessman

Jean-Michel Nihoul (23 April 1941 – 23 October 2019) was a Belgian businessman and convicted felon. During the 1990s and 2000s, he was the subject of a media and legal case in connection with the Marc Dutroux affair, but was acquitted with a Nolle prosequi ("unwillingness to pursue" or prosecute) in 2010 for alleged involvement in child abduction. However, Nihoul was sentenced to five years' imprisonment for drug trafficking and criminal association.

== Biography ==
In 1996, Michel Nihoul was convicted of fraud, forgery and the use of forgery within the framework of his activities within "SOS Sahel", a Belgian charity.

In 1998, he was accused by "Witness X1", Regina Louf, of having participated in the murder of Christine Van Hees, in 1984 at a mushroom farm in Auderghem.

In June 2004, he was sentenced to 5 years in prison for criminal association, notably with Marc Dutroux, and for drug trafficking. He was released after serving a third of his sentence. He was acquitted of complicity in the kidnappings of children for which Marc Dutroux had been sentenced to life imprisonment. He was released on parole on 28 April 2005.

In 2007, he announced legal actions against Régina Louf and journalists who defended the thesis of the pedophile network during the Dutroux affair.

On 23 April 2008, he published an autobiographical book, with sales reaching 10,000 copies in Belgium after two weeks of the launch of the book.

In 2009, he created the nonprofit organization "Adheh", an association dedicated to the defense and honour of human beings, which he managed from Zeebrugge where he resided.

In 2010, all charges against him related to the kidnappings and deaths of minors during the Dutroux case were dismissed. Also in 2010, Michel Nihoul claimed 250,000 euros in damages from Marc Verwilghen, former Belgian Minister of Justice and chairman of the parliamentary commission of inquiry into the Dutroux affair. Verwilghen himself announced a counter-action against Michel Nihoul.

Among his commercial activities was trade of aquariums. He was also a host on a radio station. Michel Nihoul died on 23 October 2019.

== Publications ==
- Taisez-vous Nihoul, Sean Publishing, 2008. (in French)
- Slaap zacht, Sean Publishing, 2008. (in Dutch)

== Bibliography ==
- Herwig Lerouge, Le Dossier Nihoul: les enjeux du procès Dutroux, EPO, 2004 (ISBN 2-87262-212-8)
- Moi Michel Nihoul, Georges Huercano-Hidalgo, editor Luc Pire, 2007, (ISBN 2-87415-723-6)
