= White March =

Demonstration in Belgium

The White March (French: Marche blanche; Dutch: Witte Mars; German: Weißer Marsch) was a demonstration in Brussels on 20 October 1996 after serial killer and criminal Marc Dutroux was arrested. The demonstrators wanted better protection for children and a better functioning justice system that could investigate the Dutroux affair independently. In French, peaceful demonstrations commemorating victims (memorial marches) are called "marches blanches".

== Prior events ==
After Marc Dutroux was arrested on 13 August 1996, and the kidnapped girls Sabine Dardenne and Laetitia Delhez were freed from his basement on 15 August, commotion started. In subsequent days, the dead bodies of four other kidnapped girls were found buried in various properties that Dutroux had owned. At first, the anger amongst the Belgian people was directed mainly at Dutroux himself, but it quickly targeted the police, the justice department and the politicians as well. Many Belgians denounced the police and government for botching the investigation into the earlier kidnappings and failing to arrest Dutroux earlier, allowing him to kill off the first four victims.

A week prior to the White March people had already begun gathering in front of several courtrooms in Belgium.

The mistrust of the police, justice department and politicians increased when the popular investigating magistrate Jean-Marc Connerotte, who had been collecting evidence against Dutroux, was accused of bias after attending a charity event for the victims' parents and dismissed from the case. On 14 October people entered the streets carrying flags which said: "I'm ashamed to be a Belgian".

== The White March ==
On 20 October about 300,000 people (estimates range from 275,000 to 350,000, around 3% of Belgium's population) marched through Brussels. Many Belgians who lived outside Brussels came to the city to take part in the march. This demonstration was called the "White March", everyone was carrying something white: a balloon, a cloak, etc.; some had painted their face white. White was meant symbolically, as the color of hope. This symbolism had grown after Queen Fabiola wore white at the funeral of her husband. During the march, the fire brigade turned their hoses on the Federal Parliament buildings to symbolically cleanse it. With the demonstration, the Belgian public opinion wanted to indicate something had to change in Belgium and that the justice system and the police had to show more attention to children.

== Aftermath ==
After the demonstration so called "white groups" or "white committees" were created. Later on they formed a commemoration in Neufchâteau with about 6,500 people attending, including parents of missed and murdered children. The white committees often criticized Jean-Luc Dehaene, who was the Prime Minister at the time, because the guilty still had not been punished.
