= Marcinelle =

Marcinelle Mårcinele (Walloon)
- Former municipality of Belgium
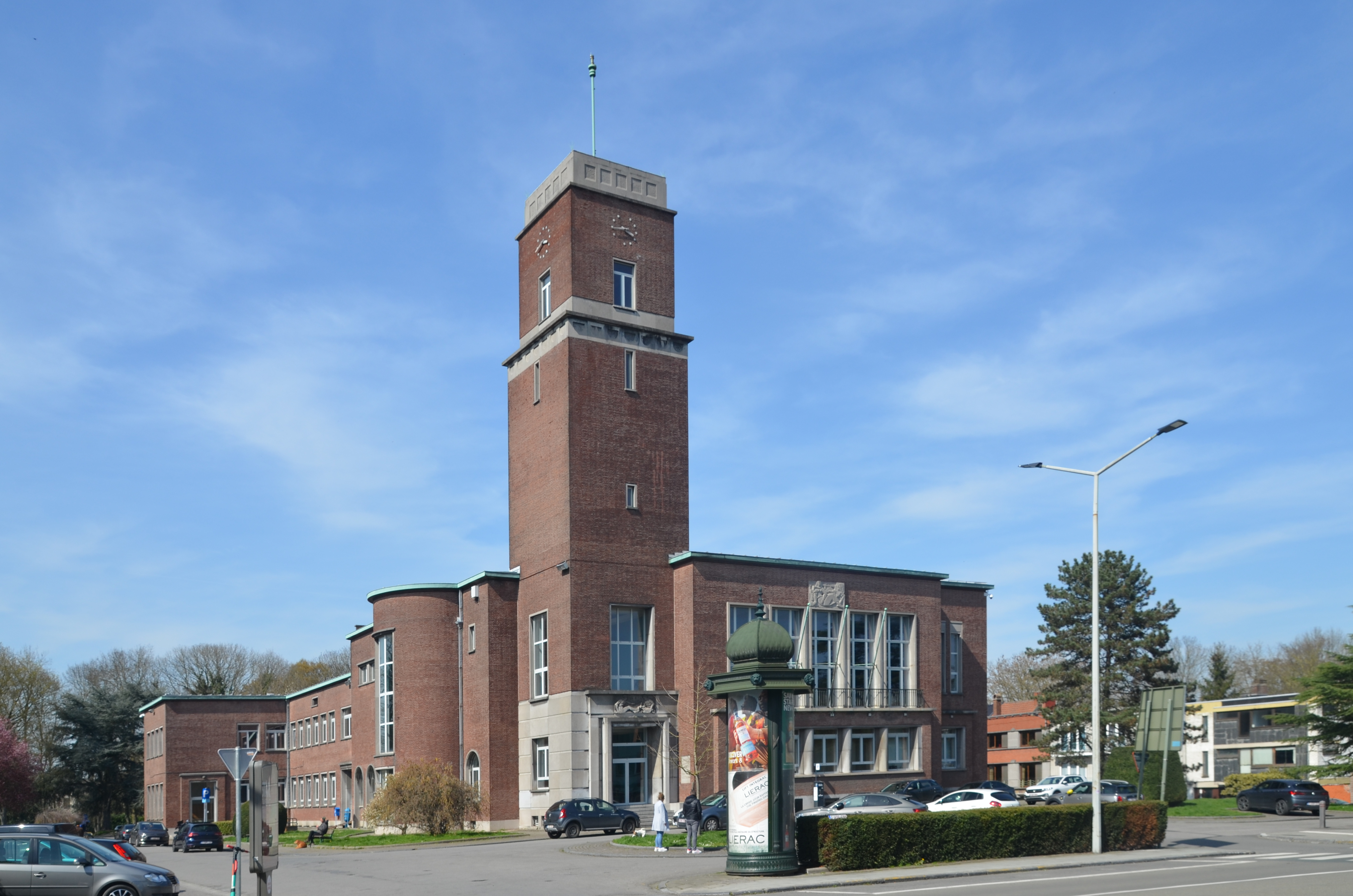
- Town hall

- Location in the municipality of Charleroi

- Location in Belgium
- Coordinates: 50°24′N 4°26′E
- Country: Belgium
- Region: Wallonia
- Community: French Community
- Province: Hainaut
- Municipality: Charleroi

Area
  - Total: 5.08 sq mi (13.16 km^{2})

Population (2001)
  - Total: 22,877
- Time zone: UTC+1 (CET)
  - Summer (DST): UTC+2 (CEST)
- Postal code: 6001
- Area code: 071

Marcinelle (French pronunciation: [maʁsinɛl]; Walloon: Mårcinele) is a town of Wallonia and a district of the municipality of Charleroi, located in the province of Hainaut, Belgium.

Until 1977, it was a municipality of its own.

The town of Marcinelle is renowned as the home of comics publisher Dupuis and as the birthplace of the celebrated Marcinelle school of Franco-Belgian comics. Many notable creators in the genre have been based in Marcinelle, lending to its reputation as a hub of comic artists. Marcinelle is also the place where serial killer Marc Dutroux lived, before his arrest.

== History ==
=== Mining accident of Marcinelle ===
On the morning of August 8, 1956, a fire in the mines of Marcinelle resulted in 262 casualties. At the time of the incident, 274 people were working in the colliery Bois du Cazier, also known as Puits Saint-Charles. A mining wagon incorrectly positioned in the elevator cage struck an oil pipe and electrical cables when the elevator started moving. This caused a fire, which trapped the miners working in the galleries below. Of the 274 people working on that morning, only twelve survived. Most of the victims were immigrants. Among the victims, there were 136 Italians, 95 Belgians, eight Poles, six Greeks, five Germans, five Frenchmen, three Hungarians, one Englishman, one Dutchman, one Russian and one Ukrainian.

Rescue operations continued until August 23 when the final verdict came from the mouth of a rescuer: "Tutti cadaveri!" (All corpses). The incident prompted Italy to demand better working conditions for the Italian guest workers in Belgium. Belgium, however, decided to recruit foreign workers from other countries more actively.

In the resulting prosecution, the trial court acquitted all of the accused on October 1, 1959. An appeal was lodged, and on January 30, 1961, the court gave the mine manager a six-month suspended jail sentence and a 2,000 Belgian franc fine (equivalent to €300 in 2006 after adjusting for inflation) and acquitted the other defendants.

The catastrophe had left such a legacy behind that it was selected as the main motif for a 2006 commemorative coin: the ten-Euro 50th anniversary of the catastrophe "Bois du Cazier" at Marcinelle coin. The obverse shows a portrait of a miner, with the mine "Bois du Cazier" in the background.

On September 19, 1981 a souvenir sheet was issued commemorating the 25th anniversary of the disaster, showing a scene of the disaster and a stamp of the Pieta, by Ben Genaux.

== Gallery ==
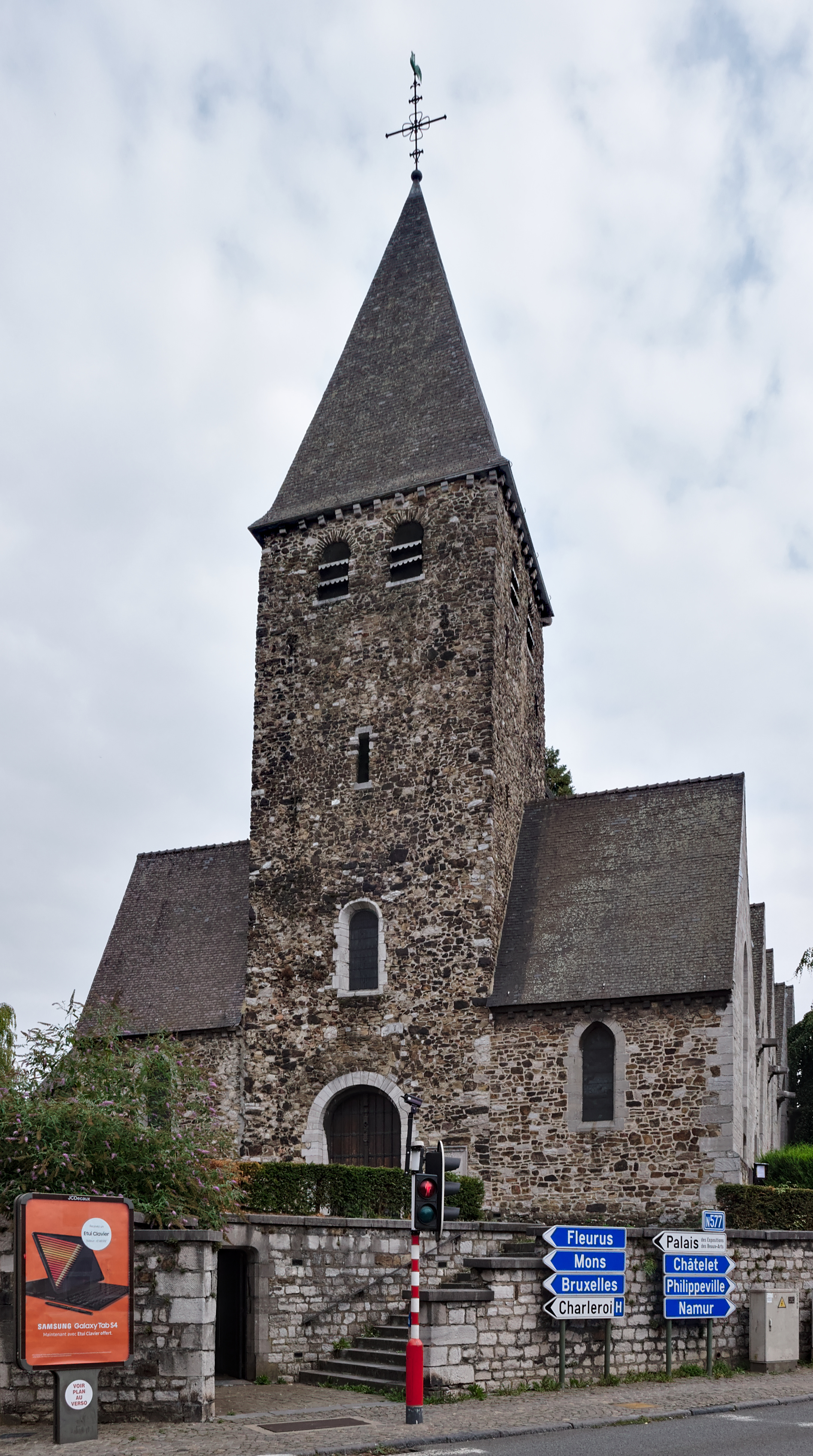
12th century St. Martin's church.

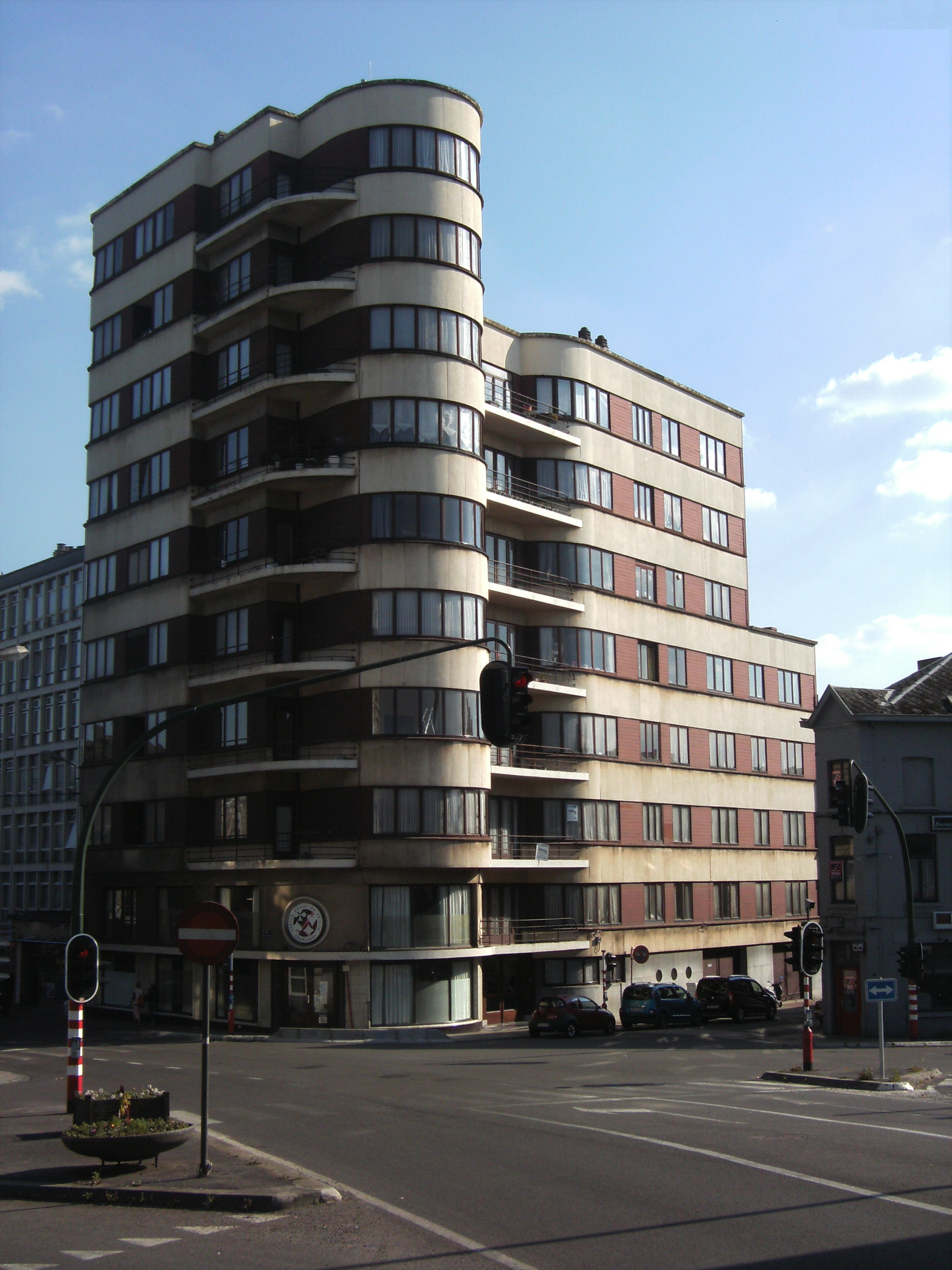
Meurée avenue – Résidence Albert by architect Marcel Leborgne (1938).

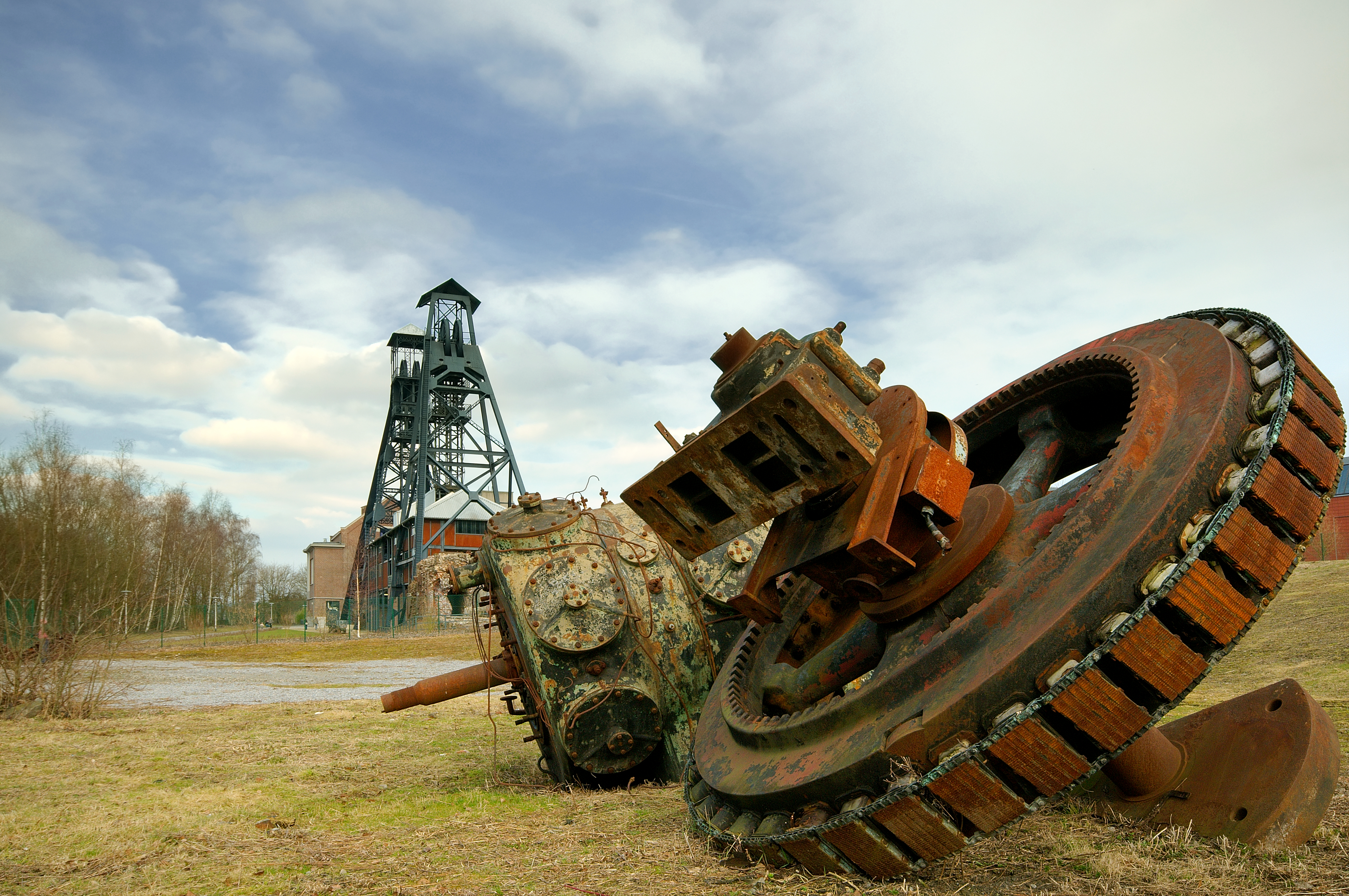
Ruins of Bois du Cazier.

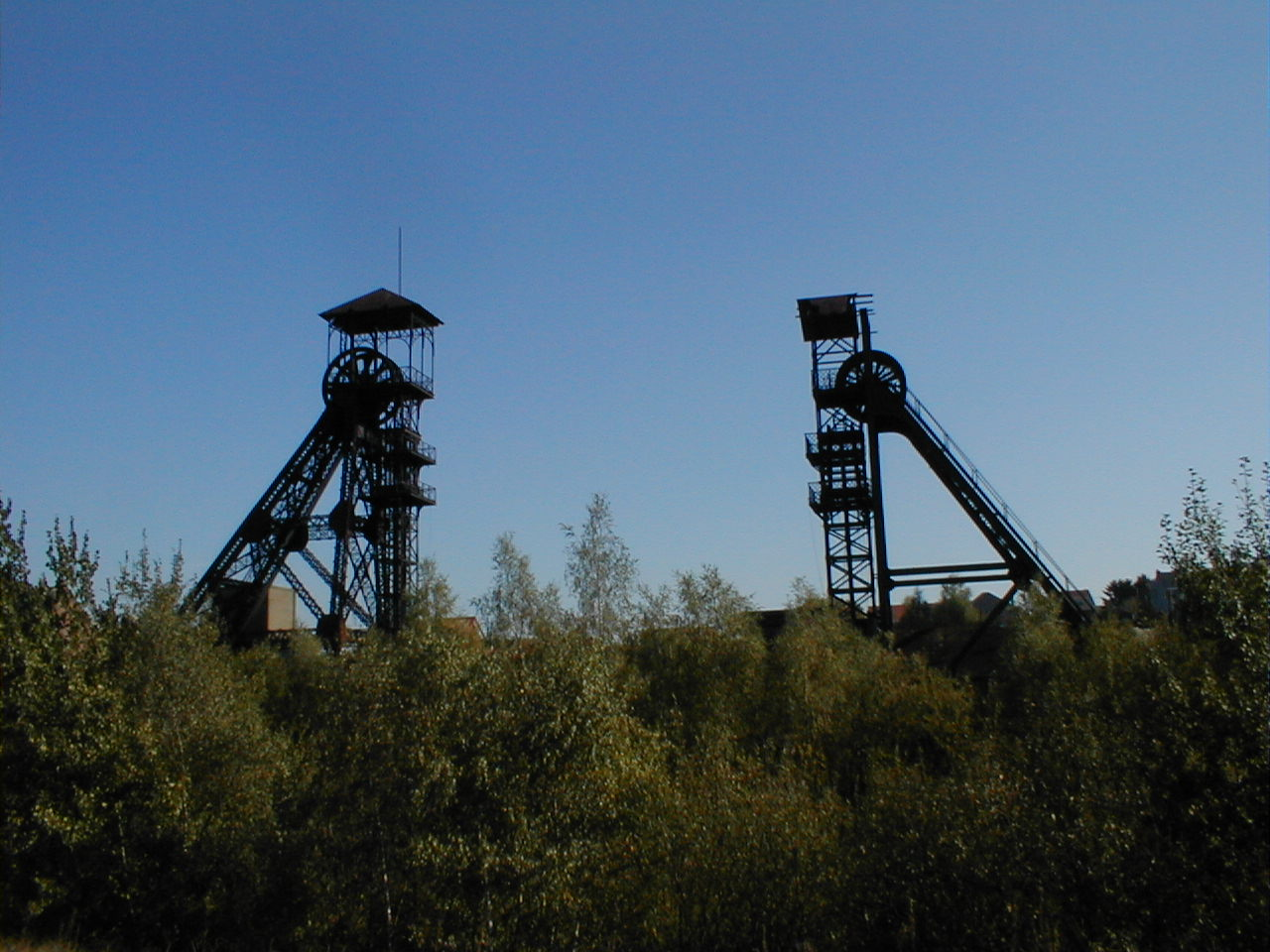
Headframes of the 'Bois du Cazier'

== Notable inhabitants ==
- Marc Dutroux, convicted child molester and serial killer (1956–)
- Paul Pastur, lawyer and politician (1866–1938)
- Gaston Salmon (1878–1917) – épée fencer, Olympic champion
