= Neufchâteau, Luxembourg Province =

City in Wallonia, Belgium

Neufchâteau Li Tchestea (Walloon)
- City and municipality
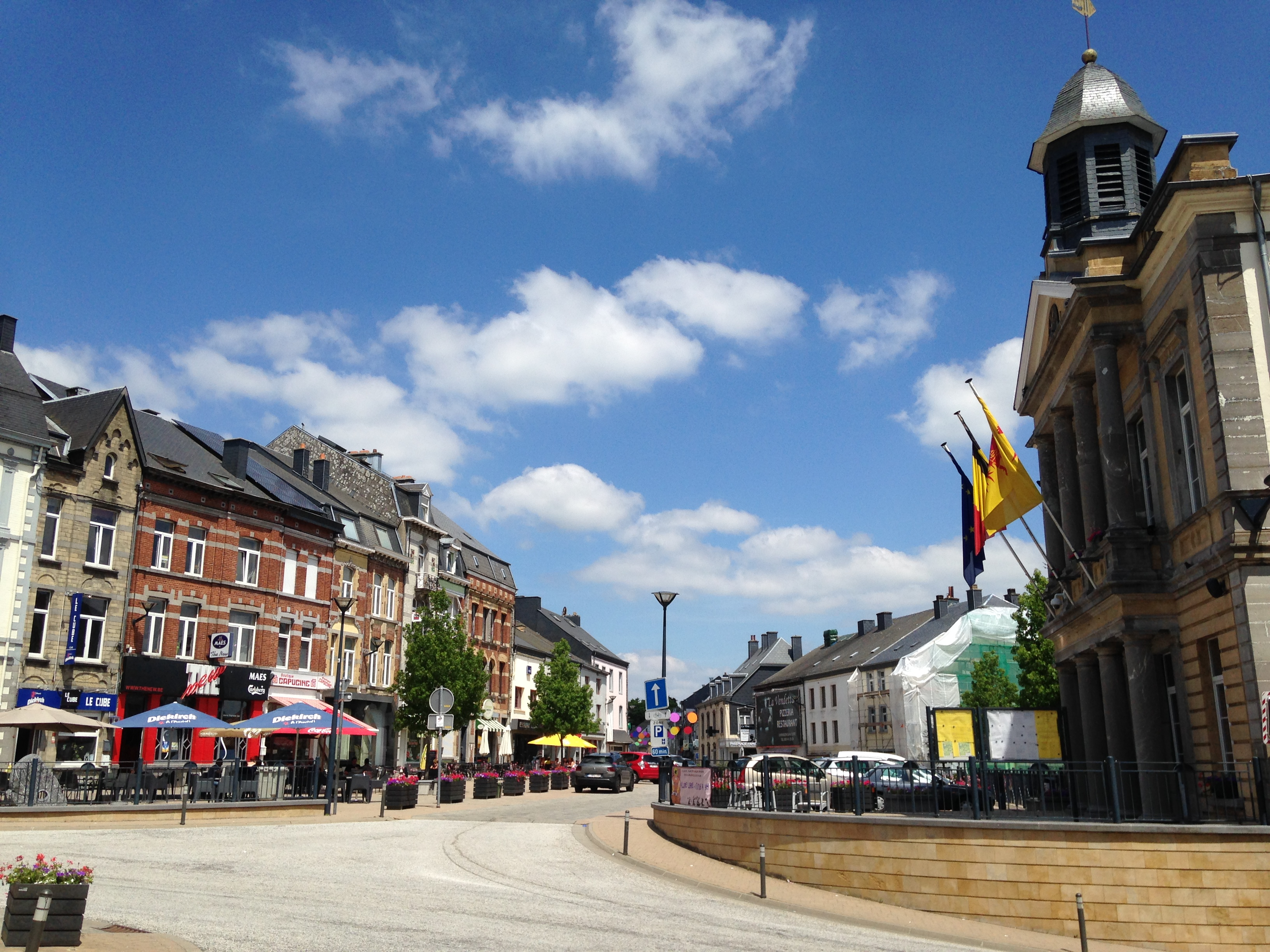
- Grand-Place, the town centre

- Flag Coat of arms

- The commune and its district in the province of Luxembourg
- Interactive map of Neufchâteau
- Location in Belgium
- Coordinates: 49°50′N 05°26′E
- Country: Belgium
- Community: French Community
- Region: Wallonia
- Province: Luxembourg
- Arrondissement: Neufchâteau

Government
  - Mayor: Michèle Mons delle Roche (Pour vous)
  - Governing party: Pour vous - 3ème Piste

Area
  - Total: 114.46 km^{2} (44.19 sq mi)

Population (2021-12-01)
  - Total: 8,029
  - Density: 70.15/km^{2} (181.7/sq mi)
- Postal codes: 6840
- NIS code: 84043
- Area codes: 061 - 063
- Website: neufchateau.be

Neufchâteau (French pronunciation: [nøʃato]; Walloon: Li Tchestea) is a city and municipality of Wallonia located in the province of Luxembourg, Belgium.

On 1 January 2018 the municipality, which covers 113.79 km^{2} (43.93 sq mi), had 7,679 inhabitants, giving a population density of 67 inhabitants per square kilometre (170 inhabitants/mi^{2}).

The municipality consists of the following districts: Grandvoir, Grapfontaine, Hamipré, Longlier, Neufchâteau, and Tournay.

Other localities are: Cousteumont, Fineuse, Gérimont, Harfontaine, Hosseuse, Lahérie, LeSart, Malome, Marbay, Massul, Molinfaing, MonIdée, Montplainchamps, Morival, Namoussart, Nolinfaing, Offaing, Petitvoir, Respelt, Semel, Tronquoy, Verlaine, and Warmifontaine.

== History ==
=== Early history ===
A Neolithic megalith dating from about 2000 BC and a Celtic necropolis dating from between the 5th and 2nd centuries BC have been found in this area, attesting to early human activity. Gallo-Roman sepultures and a small Roman villa were found here as well, showing the presence around the 2nd century AD of a minor agricultural domain. The region was used in Carolingian times mostly as a hunting area and population remained sparse throughout the Middle Ages. A document dating from 1100 shows that one of the many tiny hamlets in the area, Semel, was donated to the Abbey of Amdain (currently Saint-Hubert). In 1239, that same hamlet was mentioned as being part of the lordship of Neufchâteau, at the time when it was now given to the Orval Abbey. Like many of its neighbours, the lordship of Neufchâteau was part of the Duchy of Luxembourg.

=== 17th century until now ===
An important document for the history of the Neufchâteau region is a 1609 painting entitled "LA TERRE ET PREVOSTEE DE NEVFCHASTEAV AVECQZ SES DESPENDENCES", now kept in the Arlon archives. The painting shows the town of Neufchâteau within its protective walls, at the foot of its castle, surrounded by a number of villages and hamlets. In the mid-17th century, the plague and Louis XIV’s wars decimated the area. After the French Revolution and until 1815, Neufchâteau became the chief town of the old French département of Forêts. During World War I, its governor, Count Hans von Blumenthal, was one of a small number of German military officials who struck up a rapport with the local population, chiefly through his interest in hunting. Fighting in the area, however, was heavy, as more than 200 soldiers lost their lives in the first month of the war.

The cell biologist and Nobel Prizewinner Albert Claude was born in Longlier, close to Neufchâteau, in 1899.

== Sights ==
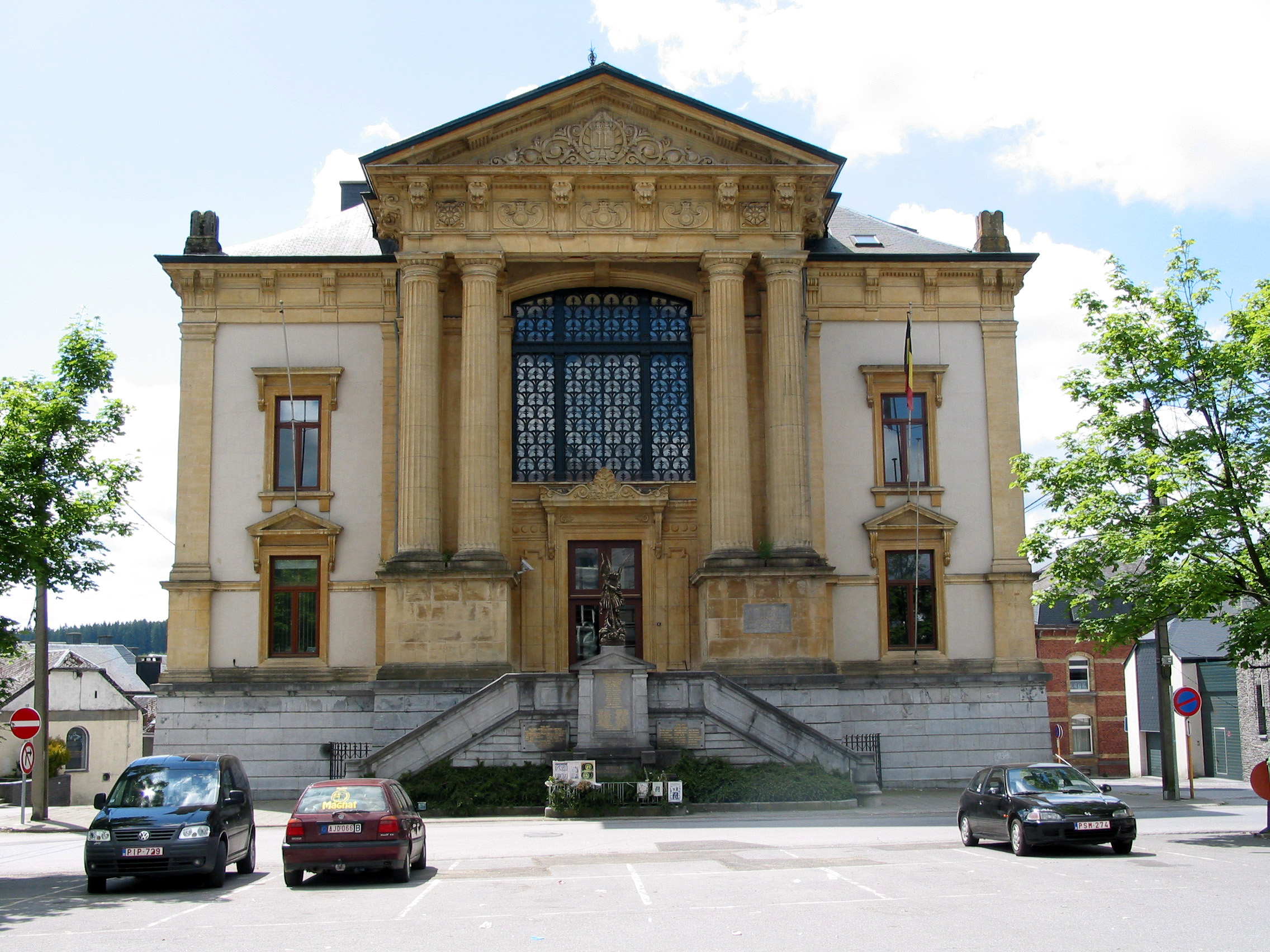
The hall of justice

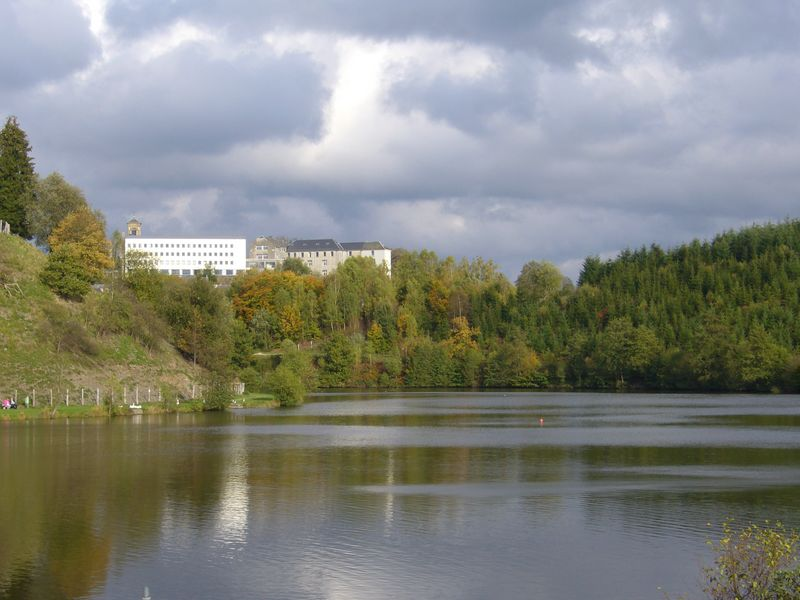
Lake Neufchâteau

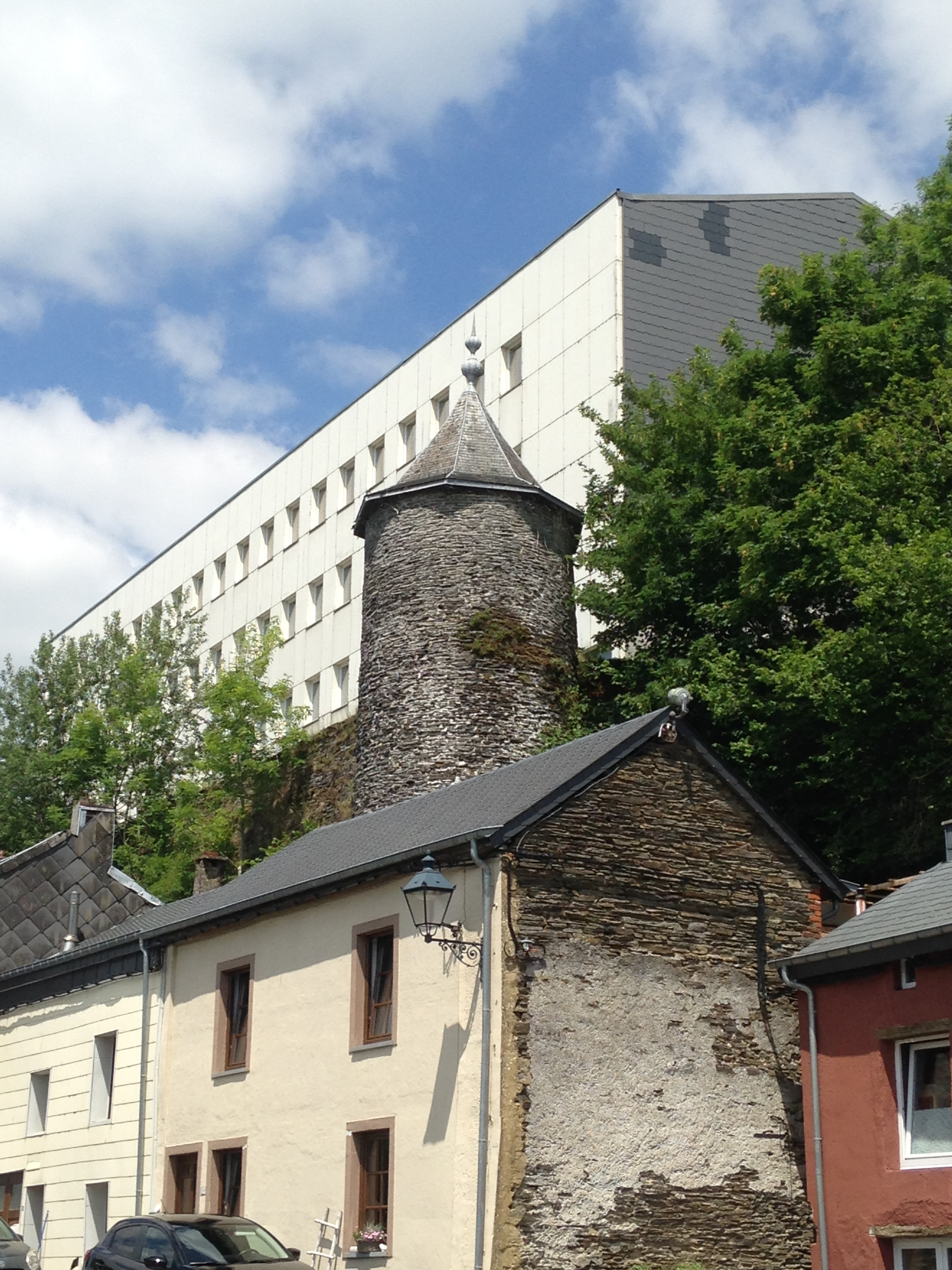
Griffon Tower, the only remnant of the castle

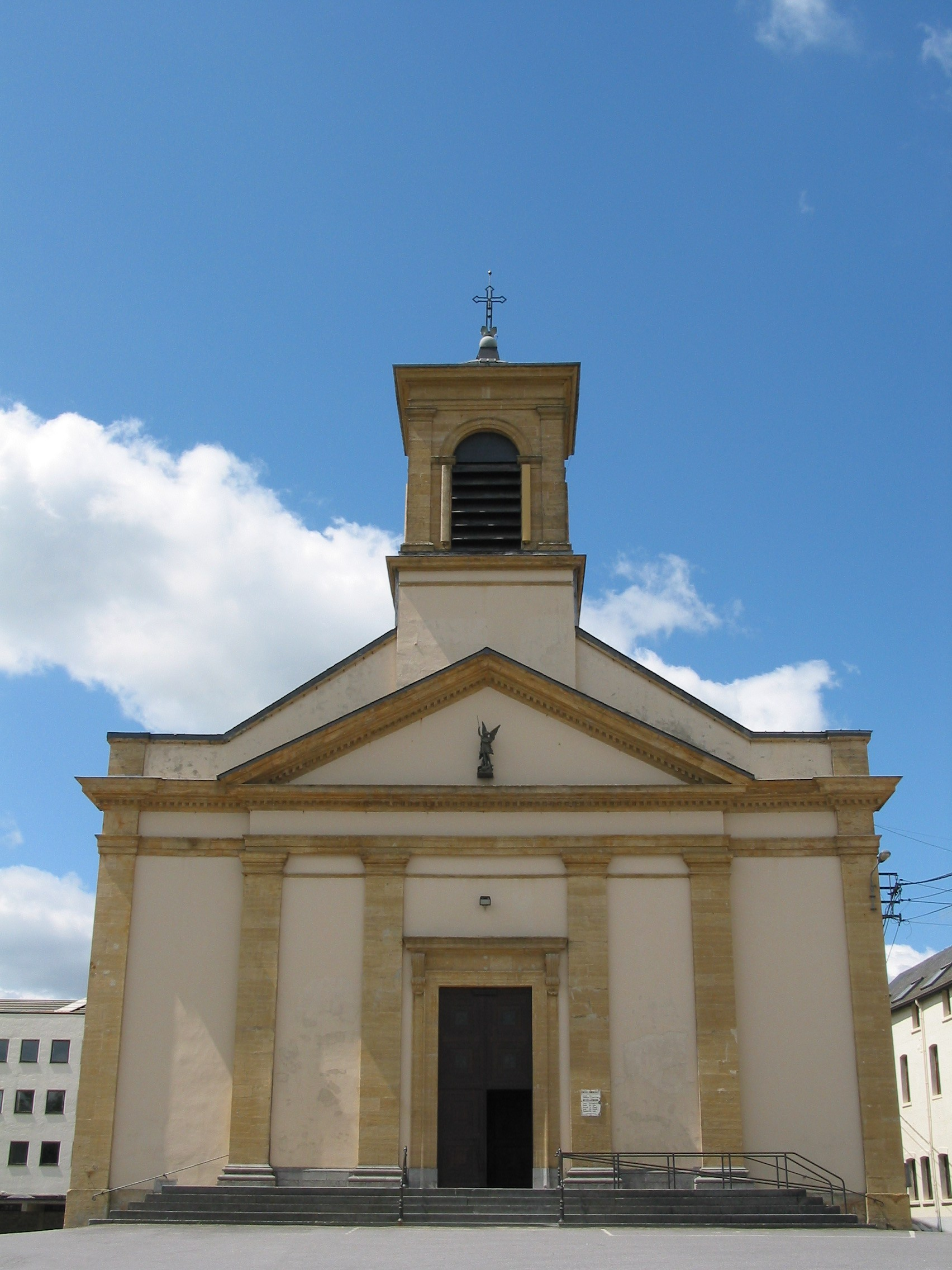
The Church in Neufchâteau-town

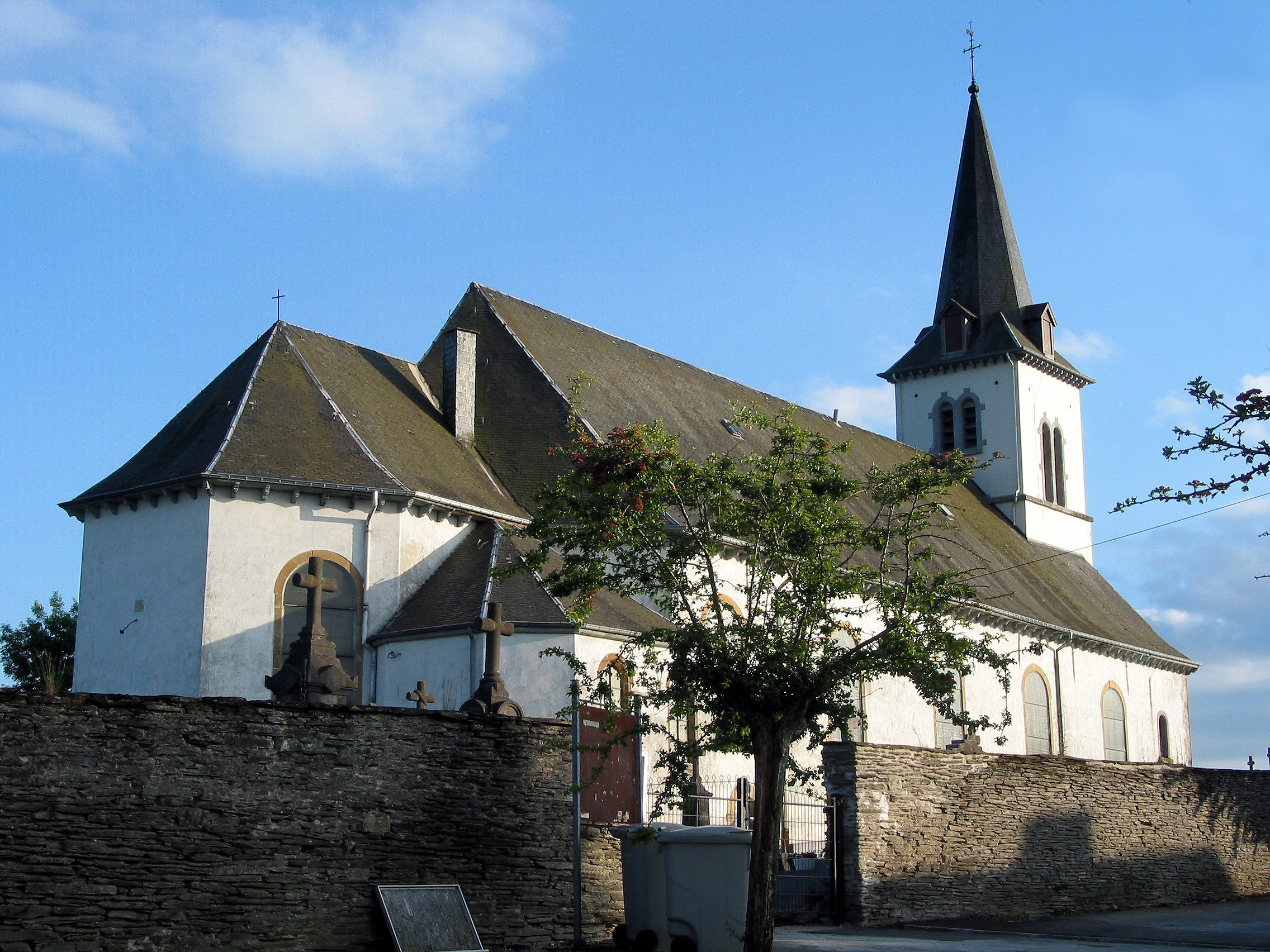
The church in Longlier

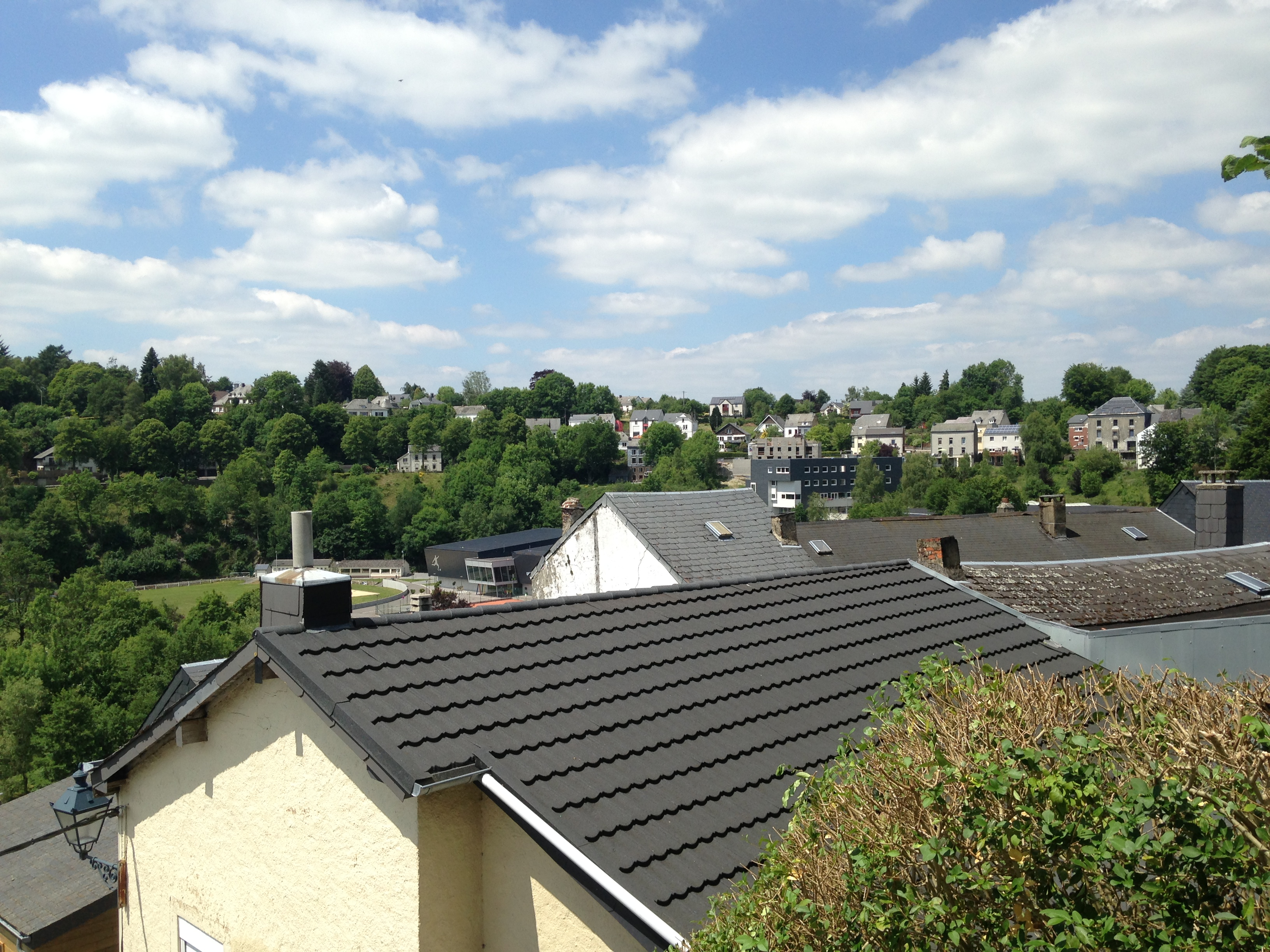
View of part of the town
- The city hall, law courts, and main church
- The Griffon tower, last remnant of the medieval castle that gave the city its name
- The rural-life museum
- Lake Neufchâteau

== Climate ==
Climate data for Neufchateau
Month	Jan	Feb	Mar	Apr	May	Jun	Jul	Aug	Sep	Oct	Nov	Dec	Year
Mean daily maximum °C (°F)	3 (37)	4 (40)	7 (44)	12 (54)	17 (63)	21 (69)	21 (70)	21 (69)	18 (64)	12 (54)	7 (44)	3 (37)	12 (54)
Mean daily minimum °C (°F)	−4 (24)	−3 (27)	−2 (29)	2 (36)	7 (44)	9 (48)	10 (50)	10 (50)	7 (45)	4 (40)	1 (33)	−3 (26)	3 (38)
Average precipitation mm (inches)	91 (3.6)	41 (1.6)	61 (2.4)	61 (2.4)	58 (2.3)	79 (3.1)	110 (4.4)	81 (3.2)	66 (2.6)	120 (4.7)	84 (3.3)	100 (4.1)	960 (37.8)
Source: Weatherbase
