= List of solved missing person cases (1990s) =

== 1990s ==
=== 1990 ===
Date	Person(s)	Age	Country of disappearance	Circumstances	Outcome	Time spent missing or unconfirmed
1990	Leann Marion Whitlock	19	United States of America	19-year-old Leann Whitlock, a sophomore student of James Madison University, was abducted by two men outside a shopping mall in Harrisonburg, Virginia, before she was murdered in a wooded area in Augusta County, Virginia. Whitlock's body was found eight days later, and within six months, the two kidnappers, Tommy David Strickler and Ronald Lee Henderson, were arrested and charged with murder. Strickler was sentenced to death and executed on July 21, 1999, while Henderson was sentenced to life imprisonment.	Murdered	8 days
1990	Lise Roy	30	Canada	In April 1990, she became the first victim of serial killer Camille Cléroux, her husband. Her body was found in 2011 buried in the yard of their former home at 1535 Heatherington Road in the Heron Gate neighbourhood of Ottawa.	Murdered	21 years
1990	Raymond Lamont Smith	32	United States of America	Raymond Lamont Smith, a male sex worker at a Milwaukee tavern, was lured into the apartment of serial killer Jeffrey Dahmer, who drugged him and strangled him to death. Smith's skull was found over a year after he was killed, when Dahmer was arrested in July 1991. Dahmer, who confessed to murdering Smith and 16 other men, was convicted and sentenced to life in prison.	Murdered	1 year and 2 months
1990	David Andrew Spears	47	United States of America	The second victim of serial killer Aileen Wuornos. Spears was murdered on May 19, 1990; his body was discovered along US 19 on June 1.	Murdered	2 weeks
1990	Susan Poupart	29	United States of America	Susan Poupart, a Native-American woman from Lac du Flambeau, Wisconsin, disappeared on May 20, 1990. Her body was found six months later in the Chequamegon-Nicolet National Forest.	Murdered	6 months
1990	Charles Edmund Carskaddon Jr.	40	United States of America	The third victim of serial killer Aileen Wuornos. Carskaddon was murdered on May 31, 1990. He disappeared en route to Tampa, Florida; his body was discovered Pasco County.	Murdered	3 weeks
1990	Edward Warren Smith	32	United States of America	Edward Warren Smith was lured into the apartment of his co-worker Jeffrey Dahmer, who drugged him and strangled him to death. Smith's skeleton was acidified and his skull was accidentally destroyed by Dahmer, who placed it in the oven to dry it. Although no remains were recovered, Dahmer confessed to Smith's murder and 16 others after his July 1991 arrest. As a result of these killings, he was sentenced to life without parole.	Murdered	1 year and 1 month
1990	Joseph Doucé	45	Belgium	A Belgian psychologist abducted from his flat by two men with police identification badges on July 19, 1990. His body was found in a forest three months later. Doucé's murder has never been solved.	Murdered	3 months
1990	Troy Eugene Burress	50	United States of America	On July 31, 1990, he was reported missing and on August 4, 1990, his body was found in a wooded area along State Road 19 in Marion County, Florida. He had been shot twice by Aileen Wuornos.	Murdered	5 days
1990	Diana Turbay	39	Colombia	Colombian journalist who was abducted on August 30, 1990, by members of the Los Priscos, who deceived her into believing that she was going to interview guerilla leader Manuel Pérez. She was detained in Copacabana, where she was later killed during a botched rescue attempt.	Fatally shot during rescue attempt	5 months
1990	David Courtney Thomas	22	United States of America	The ninth victim of serial killer Jeffrey Dahmer. Thomas was a 22-year-old father of two whom Dahmer encountered at the Grand Avenue Mall on September 24, 1990. Thomas was drugged, strangled and dismembered. Dahmer confessed to his murder following his 1991 arrest.	Murdered	1 year
1990	Tan Hui Ngin	30	Singapore	Tan Hui Ngin, a Singaporean, was last seen on October 12, 1990, heading to her brother-in-law's house to babysit but did not return home, leading her family to file a missing persons report. Four days later, Tan's half-naked corpse was discovered at an abandoned egg hatchery 300 m away from her kampong house in Punggol, with signs that she was raped before death. Tan's childhood friend and former lover, 30-year-old Lim Lye Hock, was found responsible for the killing and sentenced to death on 1 December 1993.	Murdered	4 days
1990	James Bernardo	12	United States of America	Bernardo was abducted from a Pittsfield, Massachusetts theater by convicted child killer Lewis Stephen Lent Jr. on October 22, 1990. He was strangled to death in an area of woodland in Newfane, New York, the following morning. Bernardo's body was found by a hunter on November 21.	Murdered	4 weeks
1990	Lazaro Figueroa	3	United States of America	Figueroa was a three-year-old boy murdered by his mother, Ana Maria Cardona, and her lover, Olivia Gonzalez, on October 31, 1990, following an extensive period of physical and psychological abuse. His body was discovered in Miami Beach on November 2. Cardona was sentenced to life in prison; Gonzalez was released after 14 years' imprisonment.	Murdered	2 days
1990	Fusako Sano	9	Japan	Sano was kidnapped by a 28-year-old man in 1990 after watching a baseball game in Sanjō, Niigata. She was held captive in his Kashiwazaki home for nearly a decade when police were summoned to the home after the kidnapper caused a disturbance with public health center officials who visited there.	Found alive	9 years
1990	Barbara Kaye Williams	30	United States of America	Williams' decomposed body was found in Salt Lake City, Utah, on March 22, 1991. She had died of a gunshot wound, and had been missing since the previous year. Her body remained unidentified until March 1999. Her husband, Howell Williams, was later convicted of her murder.	Murdered	6 months

=== 1991 ===
Date	Person(s)	Age	Country of disappearance	Circumstances	Outcome	Time spent missing or unconfirmed
1991	Vicky Hamilton	15	United Kingdom	15-year-old Vicky Hamilton was last seen waiting for a bus in Bathgate, West Lothian, in February 1991 as she travelled home after a night out. The case became Scotland's biggest missing persons enquiry. On November 14, 2007, her body was discovered buried at the Margate home of Peter Tobin, who was being investigated for the murder of Angelika Kluk in Glasgow in 2006. Tobin was convicted of Hamilton's murder, as well as those of Kluk and Dinah McNicol, and given a whole-life order.	Murdered	16 years
1991	Curtis Durrell Straughter	17	United States of America	On February 18, 1991, 17-year-old Curtis Straughter was lured into the apartment of serial killer Jeffrey Dahmer, who drugged, handcuffed and strangled him before dismembering his body in the bathtub. Straughter remained missing until his remains were found in Dahmer's apartment after the Dahmer's July 1991 arrest. Dahmer, who confessed to a total of 17 murders in both Wisconsin and Ohio, was convicted of murdering Straughter and 15 other men, and sentenced to 16 consecutive life terms without the possibility of parole.	Murdered	5 months
1991	Errol Lindsey	19	United States of America	In April 1991, 19-year-old Errol Lindsey was lured into the apartment of serial killer Jeffrey Dahmer, who drugged him, drilled a hole in his skull, and injected hydrochloric acid into the hole. Lindsey regained consciousness for a while before Dahmer drugged and strangled him again. Lindsey remained missing until his remains were found in Dahmer's apartment after Dahmer's July 1991 arrest. For the murders of Lindsey and 15 other men, Dahmer was sentenced to 16 consecutive terms of life without parole.	Murdered	3 months
1991	Anna Schaftner Lundin	Uncertain	Denmark	The mother of serial killer Peter Lundin disappeared on April 1, 1991, and her body was found November 1, 1991.	Murdered	7 months
1991	Karmein Chan	13	Australia	Karmein Chan, an Australian girl who was abducted from her home at night on April 13, 1991, in the Melbourne suburb of Templestowe; her body was found on April 9, 1992, in Edgars Creek, Thomastown.	Murdered	1 year
1991	Rachel McLean	19	United Kingdom	Rachel McLean, a British student at the University of Oxford, disappeared on April 14, 1991. Her boyfriend John Tanner, known to be controlling and abusive, made public appeals for her return, but 17 days later police found her body hidden in a gap under the stairs at their home. Tanner was convicted of her murder and was released in 2003. In 2018 he was jailed again for assaulting his partner.	Murdered	17 days
1991	Tuula Lukkarinen	28	Kellokoski, Finland	28-year-old Tuula Lukkarinen disappeared on the morning of April 17, 1991 after leaving a Kellokoski psychiatrist hospital where she had been an inpatient, planning to travel to Hyrylä to attend a meeting about her son's custody case. The following day, Lukkarinen's multilated body was discovered by a landowner in Hikiä. Police also recovered her handbag and a possible murder weapon at the scene.	Murdered	1 day
1991	Ailton Fonseca	10	Brazil	A victim of the Altamira child emasculations. Fonesca disappeared on May 5, 1991; his body was discovered on June 20.	Murdered	46 days
1991	Timothy Wiltsey	5	United States of America	Wiltsey's mother told the police that he went missing from a local carnival in South Amboy, New Jersey on May 25, 1991. Almost a year later, his remains were discovered in nearby Edison. A quarter-century later, his mother was convicted of his murder; five years after that the New Jersey Supreme Court vacated that conviction for insufficient evidence.	Died (undetermined cause)	1 year
1991	Tony Anthony Hughes	31	United States of America	The twelfth victim of serial killer Jeffrey Dahmer. Hughes was murdered by a fatal injection of hydrochloric acid into his brain. His skull was found two months later when Dahmer was arrested for the attempted murder of an 18th victim (who survived). Dahmer was sentenced to life without parole for murdering Hughes and 15 other men.	Murdered	2 months
1991	Konerak Sinthasomphone	14	United States of America	The thirteenth victim of serial killer Jeffrey Dahmer; Sinthasomphone was coincidentally the younger brother of a boy whom Dahmer molested in 1988. Sinthasomphone was murdered via a fatal injection of hydrochloric acid into his brain. Sinthasomphone's remains were found two months later when Dahmer was arrested. Dahmer was sentenced to life without parole for murdering Sinthasomphone and 15 other boys and men.	Murdered	2 months
1991	Jaycee Dugard	11	United States of America	Dugard was abducted on June 10, 1991, and was found alive on August 26, 2009, when her abductor brought her to a Concord, California parole office.	Found alive	18 years
1991	Leslie Mahaffy	14	Canada	Leslie Mahaffy was a female Canadian teenager who disappeared on June 16, 1991, from Burlington, Ontario. Mahaffy's body was discovered in Lake Gibson on June 29, 1991. She was the second Canadian murder victim of killers Paul Bernardo and Karla Homolka.	Murdered	2 weeks
1991	Christina Burgin	19	United States	Christina Burgin was a teenage woman student at McNeese State University in Iowa who disappeared on June 20, 1991, and was found dead two weeks later after being murdered.	Murdered	2 weeks
1991	Margaret Perry	26	United Kingdom	Margaret Perry was from Portadown, County Armagh, Northern Ireland; she disappeared on June 21, 1991. After a tip from the IRA, her body was found buried across the border in a field in Mullaghmore, County Sligo, Ireland, on June 30, 1992. She had been beaten to death. Her murder has never been solved.	Murdered	1 year
1991	Sheree Beasley	6	Australia	Beasley, an Australian schoolgirl from Rosebud was kidnapped, raped, and murdered by Robert Lowe on June 29, 1991, and her body was found weeks later on September 24 in a stormwater drain.	Murdered	3 months
1991	Matt Cleveland Turner	20	United States of America	Matthew Turner was killed inside the apartment of serial killer Jeffrey Dahmer, who invited him from a Chicago bus stop to his Milwaukee apartment for photo shoots. Turner was drugged, strangled, and dismembered in the bathtub. His body parts were found after Dahmer was arrested a month later, and Dahmer was sentenced to life without parole for the murders of Turner and 15 other men.	Murdered	3 weeks
1991	Donna Marie Prudhomme	34	United States of America	Donna Marie Prudhomme disappeared from Nassau Bay, Texas in July 1991 and was found dead on September 8, 1991.	Died (undetermined cause)	2–3 months
1991	Jeremiah Benjamin Weinberger	23	United States of America	Weinberger was approached by serial killer Jeffrey Dahmer at a gay bar in Chicago and invited to Dahmer's apartment in Milwaukee, Wisconsin. Dahmer drugged Weinberger, drilled a hole in his skull, and injected boiling water into the cavity. Weinberger died two days later in a comatose state caused by these actions. Weinberger's remains were discovered after Dahmer's arrest on July 22, and subsequently, Dahmer, who confessed to 17 murders between 1978 and 1991, was sentenced to 16 consecutive life terms for the murders of Weinberger and 15 other men.	Murdered	17 days
1991	Oliver Joseph Lacy	24	United States of America	The penultimate victim of serial killer Jeffrey Dahmer. Dahmer enticed Lacy to his apartment with the promise of money for posing for photographs. He was drugged and strangled with a leather strap before being decapitated, with his head and heart placed in the refrigerator.	Murdered	7 days
1991	Joseph Arthur Bradehoft	25	United States of America	The 17th and final victim of serial killer Jeffrey Dahmer. Bradehoft, a father of three children from Minnesota who was looking for work in Milwaukee, was lured into Dahmer's apartment, strangled, and decapitated. His dismembered body parts were discovered three days later, when Dahmer was arrested for the attempted murder of Tracy Edwards, who nearly became Dahmer's 18th victim before he survived. Dahmer was found guilty of murdering Bradehoft and 15 of his other victims and sentenced to 16 consecutive life sentences with no chance of parole.	Murdered	7 days
1991	Anjelica Castillo	4	United States of America	Castillo, an American girl from New York City who disappeared on July 18, 1991, and was found dead on July 23, 1991. Her body was not identified until 2013. After her identification, Castillo's paternal cousin, Conrado Juarez, confessed to murdering the girl.	Murdered	22 years
1991	Dinah McNicol	18	United Kingdom	Dinah McNicol disappeared after she and a male friend accepted a lift from a man while hitchhiking after a music festival in Hampshire in August 1991. Her friend was dropped off by the M25 motorway near Reigate, while she continued alone with the man, but was never seen again. A large sum of money was then suspiciously withdrawn from her bank account in Hampshire and Sussex. In 2007, McNicol's body was found alongside Vicky Hamilton's, a girl who also vanished in 1991, in the Margate home of Peter Tobin, who was already being investigated for a murder. Tobin was given a whole-life tariff in 2009.	Murdered	16 years
1991	Mandy Lemaire	11	United States of America	Mandy Lemaire was a young girl who went missing on August 22, 1991, in Tazlina, Alaska and was found dead ten days later after being murdered.	Murdered	10 days
1991	Luigina Giumento	57	Italy	57-year-old woman who went missing along with her 10-year-old niece in September 1991. Serial killer Elvino Gargiulo and his son/grandson Mario Gargiulo were convicted.	Murdered	Never found
1991	Valentina Paladini	10	Italy	57-year-old woman who went missing along with her 10-year-old niece in September 1991. Serial killer Elvino Gargiulo and his son/grandson Mario Gargiulo were convicted.	Murdered	Never found
1991	Leanne Holland	12	Australia	Went missing under unclear circumstances from her home in Goodna, Queensland, Australia, on September 23, 1991, and her mutilated body was found days later in Redbank Plains. Her sister's live-in boyfriend, Graham Stafford, was erroneously convicted of her murder before his conviction was quashed in 2009.	Murdered	3 days

=== 1992 ===
Date	Person(s)	Age	Country of disappearance	Circumstances	Outcome	Time spent missing or unconfirmed
1992	James Howard Conklin	42	United States of America	The man, formerly known as Kane County John Doe, was found in 1994. The body was identified as James Howard Conklin in 2024. Conklin disappeared in Utah in 1992 and is thought to have been murdered.	Murdered	2 years
1992	John D'Amato	Unknown	United States of America	D'Amato was a New Jersey mobster who was suspected of homosexual activity. He disappeared in January 1992 after Anthony Capo and two other hitmen entered D'Amato's car to drive to lunch. Capo shot D'Amato four times from the back seat, killing him. Capo and Rotundo left the body at a safe house, where other mobsters disposed of it. D'Amato's body was not recovered. In 2006, Abramo, Schifilliti and Vitabile were sentenced to life imprisonment for the murder.	Murdered	Never found
1992	Shanda Sharer	12	United States of America	Sharer was abducted, tortured and then burned alive by teenage girls in Madison, Indiana on January 11, 1992. The case gained notoriety due to the perpetrators' age, and has served as inspiration for several fictional true crime shows.	Murdered	1 day
1992	Kristen French	15	Canada	French, a Canadian school girl from Ontario who disappeared on April 16, 1992, was held captive for three days and then was killed and was found dead on April 30, 1992. She was murdered by Karla Homolka and Paul Bernardo.	Murdered	2 weeks
1992	Ebony Simpson	9	Australia	Ebony Simpson was an Australian girl who disappeared on August 19, 1992, in New South Wales. Simpson was found dead two days later on August 21, when police discovered her body in a dam at a wildlife sanctuary near her home.	Murdered	2 days
1992	Eva Taysup	27	Canada	A victim of serial killer John Martin Crawford. Taysup was an Indigenous Canadian sex worker whom Crawford encountered in a hotel foyer on the evening of September 20, 1992. According to Crawford, Taysup was murdered the following morning after the two argued over the price of her company and services. Her strangled body was discovered in Saskatoon, Saskatchewan, in October 1994.	Murdered	2 years
1992	Calinda Waterhen	22	Canada	Another victim of serial killer John Martin Crawford. Waterhen was an Indigenous Canadian woman of Cree heritage and a sex worker. She was murdered by strangulation on or about September 22 and her body discarded beneath a pile of leaves in Saskatchewan. Her body was discovered in October 1994.	Murdered	2 years
1992	Shelley Gail Napope	16	Canada	A victim of serial killer John Martin Crawford. Napope was an Indigenous Canadian woman, originally from Duck Lake, Saskatchewan, and a sex worker. She was murdered by strangulation on or about September 29. Her body was discovered in a stand of trees near a golf course in October 1994.	Murdered	2 years
1992	Nikki Allan	7	United Kingdom	A seven-year-old English girl bludgeoned to death in a derelict building in Sunderland, Tyne and Wear, England. Her body was discovered the following day, although her murderer, David Boyd, was only convicted of her death in 2023.	Murdered	1 day
1992	James Donald Lusher	16	United States of America	16-year-old James Donald Lusher disappeared near his home in Westfield, Massachusetts on November 6, 1992. In 2013, Lewis Stephen Lent Jr., a man convicted of kidnapping and murdering James Joseph Bernardo of Pittsfield, Massachusetts and Sara Anne Wood of Frankfort, New York, confessed to Lusher's abduction and murder, claiming to have discarded his body in Becket, Massachusetts. Despite Lent's confession, Lusher's remains have yet to be found.	Murdered	21 years
1992	Miriam García Iborra	14	Spain	The Alcasser Girls were three teenage girls from Alcasser, Spain, who disappeared on November 13, 1992, and were found dead on January 27, 1993, and it was revealed that they had been kidnapped, raped, beaten, and tortured after they were abducted.	Murdered	24 days
1992	Antonia Gómez Rodríguez	15	Spain	The Alcasser Girls were three teenage girls from Alcasser, Spain, who disappeared on November 13, 1992, and were found dead on January 27, 1993, and it was revealed that they had been kidnapped, raped, beaten, and tortured after they were abducted.	Murdered	24 days
1992	Desirée Hernández Folch	14	Spain	The Alcasser Girls were three teenage girls from Alcasser, Spain, who disappeared on November 13, 1992, and were found dead on January 27, 1993, and it was revealed that they had been kidnapped, raped, beaten, and tortured after they were abducted.	Murdered	24 days
1992	Suzanne Capper	16	United Kingdom	Kidnapped, tortured and ultimately killed by four people who lured her to their house in Greater Manchester on December 8, 1992. Capper later died at hospital from severe burns from being lit on fire. All four perpetrators were later given long prison sentences.	Murdered	6 days
1992	Gail Shollar	35	United States of America	Shollar was a 35-year-old Piscataway, New Jersey carjacking victim who was raped and murdered after her vehicle was commandeered from the Middlesex Shopping Mall in South Plainfield, New Jersey. Shollar's body was discovered in a drainage ditch four days later. Her murderer, 23-year-old Scott Johnson, was found guilty of her rape and murder in 1995.	Murdered	4 days
1992	Eugenio Berríos	45	Uruguay	Berríos, a Chilean biochemist who worked for the DINA intelligence agency, was captured in 1992 while in hiding in Uruguay and disappeared. His corpse was found in 1995 near Montevideo and identified by dental records and DNA.	Murdered	3 years
1992	Tan Heng Hong	32	Singapore	On 29 November 1992, 32-year-old Tan Heng Hong was last seen leaving his home, and he never came back. Four days later, his charred body was discovered in his burnt car abandoned at Mandai. Two suspects, Maniam Rathinswamy and S. S. Asokan, both security guards, were arrested and later executed by hanging in 1995.	Murdered	4 days
1992	Arnold Archambeau	20	United States of America	Archambeau and Bruguier left her cousin behind in a car that overturned following a predawn accident outside Lake Andes, South Dakota; neither is certainly known to have been seen alive again although sightings postdating the accident were reported to police. Almost three months later, their bodies were found in a ditch near the accident site despite not having been seen there since the accident; while autopsies ruled the cause of death to be exposure, evidence in addition to the sightings led local enforcement to believe they died somewhere else and were moved to where they were found. An FBI investigation was inconclusive.	Died from hypothermia	3 months
1992	Ruby Bruguier	18	United States of America		Died from hypothermia	3 months
1992	Katie Beers	10	United States of America	Beers disappeared on December 28, 1992, during a shopping trip with neighbor John Esposito and was found in a secret room underneath Esposito's home on January 13, 1993. Esposito had been considered a family friend. Prior to the kidnapping she had been the subject of a lengthy custody battle between her mother and godmother and suffered material deprivation, sexual abuse and hardship.	Found alive	16 days
1992	Angela Toler	23	United States of America	After moving from Princeton, North Carolina to Richmond, Virginia with her boyfriend in late 1992, Toler lost contact with her family. The boyfriend later returned to Princeton without her, and no explanation for her whereabouts. Toler's body was discovered without identification near railroad tracks in Richmond in November 1992, having died of hypothermia. Toler was identified in 2012 after a cousin of her mother recognized a reconstruction of her.	Accidental death by hypothermia	Less than 3 months

=== 1993 ===
Date	Person(s)	Age	Country of disappearance	Circumstances	Outcome	Time spent missing or unconfirmed
1993	David Glenn Lewis	39	United States of America	Lewis disappeared from his home near Amarillo, Texas, following unusual behavior over the Super Bowl weekend of January 29 – February 1, 1993. Late the latter night, he was struck by an unidentified vehicle and killed on a state highway in the town of Moxee, Washington, just outside Yakima. His body was unidentified for 11 years; the reason for his presence over 1,600 mi (2,600 km) from his home has never been determined.	Died in vehicle collision	11 years
1993	James Bulger	2	United Kingdom	Two-year-old James Bulger disappeared on February 12, 1993, while shopping with his mother at the Strand Shopping Centre in Bootle, Liverpool. Security camera footage showed that he was led out of the shopping centre by two young boys. His mutilated body was found on a railway track 2 miles away two days later. The boys, later found to be Jon Venables and Robert Thompson and who were only 10 years old, had abducted, tortured and murdered Bulger.	Murdered	2 days
1993	Jennifer Odom	12	United States of America	12-year-old Jennifer Odom disappeared on February 19, 1993 after getting off the school bus near her home in Dade City, Florida when she was kidnapped. Odom remained missing for six days until her body was found in an orange grove on February 25, 1993. In August 2026, Jeffrey Norman Crum was convicted of the murder.	Murdered	6 days
1993	Rajab Mohamed	35	Singapore	On March 8, 1993, Inspector Rajab Mohamed of the Central Narcotics Bureau (CNB) went missing after he phoned his colleagues to prepare themselves for an upcoming drug bust. Before this call, Inspector Rajab was last seen alive by his wife when he responded to a pager call at his home and told her he was going to meet an informant. A day after he disappeared, Inspector Rajab's 32-year-old wife reported him missing. Police arrested the 34-year-old informant Roshdi Abdullah Altway, who confessed that he murdered Inspector Rajab during a fight over an unsettled debt. Three days after Inspector Rajab's disappearance, Roshdi led the police to Inspector Rajab's abandoned car in a Tampines carpark, where his decomposing corpse was found in the backseat. Originally convicted and sentenced to death for murder, Roshdi's appeal in 1994 led to him serving ten years' jail for manslaughter instead after an appeal court accepted that Roshdi acted in self-defence while killing Inspector Rajab. Although Roshdi escaped the gallows for killing the inspector, he was once again sentenced to death 26 years later in 2020 for drug trafficking. Roshdi was executed by hanging on April 10, 2025, after he lost his appeals against the second death sentence.	Murdered	3 days
1993	Anabel Segura	22	Spain	On 12 April 1993, Anabel Segura, a 22-year-old university student, was kidnapped and murdered by two men, Emilio Muñoz Guadix and Candido Ortiz Aon, who were not caught until two years later in 1995. Segura's body was found buried on the grounds of an abandoned factory two years later, and the cause of death was strangulation. Both Muñoz and Ortiz were sentenced to 43 years in prison in 1999 for murdering Segura.	Murdered	2 years
1993	Jayne Furlong	17	New Zealand	Furlong, a sex worker, was a New Zealander, who disappeared from a street in Auckland on May 26, 1993. Her remains were found at a beach in 2012 after being exposed by erosion of a sandbank. She had been abducted and murdered.	Murdered	19 years
1993	Jennifer Ertman	14	United States of America	Two teenage girls who were abducted, raped and strangled to death by six gang members in Houston, Texas on June 24, 1993, with their bodies found four days later.	Murdered	4 days
1993	Elizabeth Peña	16	United States of America	Two teenage girls who were abducted, raped and strangled to death by six gang members in Houston, Texas on June 24, 1993, with their bodies found four days later.	Murdered	4 days
1993	Dato Mazlan Idris	49	Malaysia	On 2 July 1993, the Batu Talam state assemblyman was reported missing in Kuala Lumpur. On 22 July 1993, Mazlan's dismembered body was discovered by the Royal Malaysia Police. The pop singer Mona Fandey was executed in 2001 for the murder.	Murdered	20 days
1993	Sim Ah Lek	50	Singapore	Sim Ah Lek, a Singaporean contractor and moneylender, was last seen on 14 July 1993, going out for an appointment. His family reported him missing the next day after he did not return home. Four hours after the report, a passer-by discovered Sim's body in a gunny sack at a carpark outside Jurong Swimming Complex, his neck slashed. After 39 hours of police investigations, 36-year-old Phua Soy Boon, who admitted to killing Sim after the victim refused to lend him S$10,000, was arrested and charged with murder. Phua was found guilty and sentenced to death on 6 May 1994, and after rejection of his appeal, was hanged in Changi Prison on 16 June 1995.	Murdered	1 day
1993	Derrick Joseph Robie	4	United States of America	A four-year-old boy murdered in Steuben County, New York. Robie's murder received national attention due to his killer, Eric Smith, being thirteen years old. Smith was arrested on August 8; he was convicted of second-degree murder the following year. He was released from prison in February 2022.	Murdered	1 day
1993	Holly Piirainen	10	United States of America	Piirainen, an American girl from Grafton, Massachusetts, disappeared on August 5, 1993. She and her brother had been visiting their grandparents in Sturbridge, Massachusetts when Holly was murdered. Piirainen's remains were found by hunters in Brimfield on October 23, 1993.	Murdered	79 days
1993	Allen Lee Livingston	27	United States of America	Livingston disappeared on 6 August 1993 and his remains were found in 1996. Livingston, who was killed by serial killer Herb Baumeister, was identified in 2023 through DNA testing after 27 years since the discovery of his remains.	Murdered	3 years
1993	Sara Anne Wood	12	United States of America	Sara Anne Wood was an American schoolgirl who disappeared on the afternoon of 18 August 1993 in Sauquoit, New York. It has now been revealed that she was murdered.	Murdered	Not found
1993	Polly Klass	12	United States of America	Polly Hannah Klass was a 12-year-old girl who was kidnapped on October 1st of 1993 during a slumber party held in her mother's home in Petaluma, CA. Two months later, Richard Allen Davis was arrested for the kidnapping and confessed to kidnapping and murdering Klaas before leading authorities to where he had hidden her body.	Murdered	2 months
1993	Mansour Rashid El-Kikhia	62	Egypt	Libyan politician and human rights activist known for his opposition to Muammar Gaddafi's regime. On December 10, 1993, he was kidnapped while on a diplomatic visit to Cairo, Egypt, allegedly by Mukhabarat operatives. His fate remained unclear until October 2012, when his body was found in a refrigerator in Tripoli, indicating that he had likely died while in custody.	Murdered	19 years
1993	Kori Lamaster	17	United States of America	Lamaster, an American female murder victim who went missing in 1993, was found on January 29, 1994, and was not identified until 2013.	Murdered	19 years

=== 1994 ===
Date	Person(s)	Age	Country of disappearance	Circumstances	Outcome	Time spent missing or unconfirmed
1994	David Cox	27	United States	Cox, a member of the United States Marine Corps, disappeared in Natick, Massachusetts, on January 5, 1994. His remains were discovered in a wooded area by a man canoeing down the Charles River near Medfield, Massachusetts on April 2, 1994; he had been shot execution-style between two hunting ranges. Cox's killing remains unsolved.	Murdered	3 months
1994	Peggy Johnson	18	United States of America	A homeless medical student from McHenry, Illinois, Johnson accepted work as a housekeeper for nurse Linda La Roche sometime in 1994. During her stay there, La Roche physically and sexually abused her for years before eventually killing her in 1999 and dumping her body in Raymond, Wisconsin. The body was unidentified until 2019, and La Roche was arrested and charged with the murder soon after.	Murdered	5 years
1994	Tina Susman	Unknown	Somalia	Susman was an American journalist who travelled around the world, covering the various current events with a primary focus on Africa. In 1994, while she was on another visit to Somalia, she was kidnapped in Mogadishu and held captive for 20 days. She was later released without harm, and continued to cover stories for the Associated Press.	Found alive	20 days
1994	Gerald Lombard	27	United States	On February 1, 1994, an unidentified corpse was found in Port Charlotte, Florida. In 2021, he was identified Gerald “Jerry” Lombard, of Lowell, Massachusetts, who vanished from his home in Florida in 1991.	Murdered	27 years
1994	Vickie Deblieux	37	United States	On February 21, 1994, 37-year-old Vickie Deblieux was abducted, tortured and murdered in Alabama by a group of four youths (aged 16 to 19) while she was hitchhiking from Tennessee to her mother's house in Louisiana. Deblieux's body was discovered four days later, and the police managed to arrest the youths responsible for her abduction and death. Three of the offenders were sentenced to life in prison, while the fourth and final member, Carey Dale Grayson, was sentenced to death.	Murdered	Four days
1994	Mohamed Hassaïne	49	Algeria	Journalist for Alger républicain who was kidnapped and murdered by armed militants after being abducted from his house in Larbatache on February 28, 1994. His beheaded body was later found in a neighboring area.	Murdered	Several days
1994	Monyane Moleleki	43	Lesotho	Lesotho politician and then-Minister of Natural Resources, who was kidnapped together with three other ministers by soldiers on April 14, 1994. During this incident, Deputy Prime Minister Selometsi Baholo was killed. Moleleki was eventually released and returned to politics.	Found alive	More than 1 year
1994	Mehdi Dibaj	58–59	Iran	Mehdi Dibaj was an Iranian former Muslim who later became a Christian pastor. On July 5, 1994, Dibaj's was body was discovered west Tehran in a park. after he had been murdered by unknown members of Iran's regime.	Murdered	Less than two weeks
1994	Rosie Palmer	3	United Kingdom	British child Rosie Palmer disappeared after buying an ice cream from an ice cream van outside her home in Hartlepool on June 30, 1994. Her body was discovered after police searched the home of local man Shaun Armstrong on July 3. Armstrong had abducted her after she had bought the ice cream and murdered her.	Murdered	3 days
1994	Arlene Arkinson	15	United Kingdom	A teenager who disappeared on 14 August 1994 in County Tyrone, Northern Ireland. In 2021, Robert Howard, who was convicted of the 2001 murder of Hannah Williams was found responsible in a posthumous inquest.	Murdered	Never found
1994	Lounès Matoub	38	Algeria	Algerian Kabylian singer, poet and intellectual who was abducted by the Islamist militant group Armed Islamic Group of Algeria on September 25, 1994. He was held in a stronghold and threatened with execution, but eventually released after a large gathering of protestors warned that they would attack if Matoub was killed.	Found alive	2 weeks
1994	Michael Anthony Hughes	6	United States of America	Michael Hughes was abducted at gunpoint from school on September 12, 1994, by his step father, Franklin Delano Floyd. No trace of the boy has been found. Floyd is considered a suspect in the hit-and-run death of his wife, whom he had abducted as a child and raised as his daughter. In a 2015 interview with the FBI, Floyd admitted to killing Hughes the same day of the kidnapping, and died in prison while on death row in January 2023.	Murdered	21 years
1994	Daniel Handley	9	United Kingdom	Handley was a British child who went missing from a street in Beckton, London while fixing a chain on his bicycle. Suspected to have been abducted by paedophiles, his case was solved in part due to appeals on the Crimewatch television programme. His skull and then body were found buried in a field in Bristol 5 months later, and known paedophiles and homosexual couple Timothy Morss and Brett Taylor were found to have abducted Handley in their car before sexually assaulting and killing him in Hungerford.	Murdered	5 months
1994	Alexander Smith	1	United States of America	On October 25, 1994 Susan Smith reported the kidnapping of her two sons; they were later found in a submerged car.	Murdered	1 week
1994	Michael Smith	3	United States of America	On October 25, 1994 Susan Smith reported the kidnapping of her two sons; they were later found in a submerged car.	Murdered	1 week
1994	Lindsay Rimer	13	United Kingdom	A British schoolgirl who disappeared from Hebden Bridge, Yorkshire, on the evening of 7 November 1994 while returning home from buying cornflakes from a local shop. Her body was discovered in the Rochdale Canal five months later. In 2016 police announced they had a DNA profile of the murderer, but no one has yet been convicted of her murder.	Murdered	5 months
1994	Luca Amorese	14	Italy	An Italian boy went missing in Rome on 13 November 1994. He was never found but serial killer Elvino Gargiulo was convicted.	Murdered	Never found
1994	Randi Boothe-Wilson	33	United States of America	Randi Boothe-Wilson disappeared from New York when planning to meet family members. Her remains were discovered in December 1995 in North Carolina and were not identified until January 2019.	Murdered	23 years
1994	Elba Soccarras	61	United States of America	A woman was found at the Woodbridge Township Center mall in New Jersey with no identification and suffering from the effects of Alzheimer's disease. She was not reported missing and was suspected to have been abandoned. It was nearly 15 years before she was identified.	Found alive	14 years, 5 months

=== 1995 ===
Date	Person(s)	Age	Country of disappearance	Circumstances	Outcome	Time spent missing or unconfirmed
1995	Henning Wehn	21	Spain	Henning Wehn was listed by Interpol as a missing person after disappearing while on holiday in Spain in 1995, while sending mysterious postcards to a friend in Germany. He reappeared in Spain after having traveled to Morocco for three weeks with a man he met on a train.	Found alive	3 weeks
1995	Scott Sherrin	23	United Kingdom	English child star who went missing in 1995, with his body found in the River Thames in March 1996. His death was determined to be the result of drowning, while he was under the influence of drugs.	Died from drowning	1 year
1995	Melanie Carpenter	23	Canada	The 23-year-old Carpenter was abducted from her workplace in Surrey, Canada on January 6, 1995. Her body was found on January 15 near the town of Hope, where it had been dumped in a crevice and covered with a blanket. On that same day, Fernand Auger, the prime suspect in the case as he had been observed withdrawing money from her bank account, committed suicide at his home.	Murdered	9 days
1995	Philip Taylor Kramer	42	United States of America	Kramer, a computer engineer and former bass guitarist for the rock band Iron Butterfly, disappeared on February 12, 1995, before he was to meet a business partner at the Los Angeles International Airport; he changed his plans and asked his guest to meet him at a nearby hotel instead, but failed to appear. During his travel to and from the airport, Kramer made a flurry of cell phone calls, including to his wife, his Iron Butterfly bandmate Ron Bushy and finally to the police. In the latter call, Kramer said, "I'm going to kill myself." He was never heard from again, which led to an extensive search for his vehicle. On May 29, 1999, Kramer's body was discovered by hikers inside his wrecked minivan at the bottom of a canyon in Malibu, California.	Died by suicide	4 years
1995	Tracie McBride	19	United States of America	McBride was a woman who was a United States Army soldier from Centerville, Minnesota who disappeared on February 18, 1995 after being kidnapped, raped and murdered. She was found dead on March 1, 1995.	Murdered	2 weeks
1995	Unnamed 14-year-old Latina girl	14	United States	A victim of serial rapist and kidnapper John Jamelske. Jamelske abducted this individual on an unknown date in March 1995. She was held captive for fifteen months in his Syracuse, New York, home before being released in the summer of 1996.	Released	15 months
1995	Deanna Cremin	17	United States of America	Deanna J. Cremin was a teenage American girl from Somerville, Massachusetts who disappeared on March 30, 1995, and was found dead four days later after being murdered.	Murdered	4 days
1995	Carl Isaacs Jr.	20	United States of America	Isaacs walked away from the Walworth County Jail in Elkhorn, Wisconsin in April 1995. His skeletal remains were discovered on November 26, 1995, alongside Turtle Creek in Bradford, near Clinton, Rock County, Wisconsin, but he remained unidentified until June 14, 2022.	Died from natural causes; possibly hypothermia	27 years
1995	Sonja Engelbrecht	19	Germany	Sonja Engelbrecht was a young teenage woman who went missing on the night of 1995 April 10–11 in Munich, Germany and whose remains were discovered on November 23, 2021. Her cause of death remains unknown.	Died (unknown cause)	26 years
1995	Kiplyn Davis	15	United States of America	Davis, a high school student, was reported missing on May 2, 1995, in Spanish Fork, Utah. She is a featured child of the Polly Klaas Foundation. Several people have been arrested in connection with her murder, although her death has not been confirmed by the discovery of a body. On February 11, 2011, Timmy Brent Olson pleaded guilty to manslaughter and was sentenced to 15 years in prison. He claimed he saw another individual hit Davis in the head with a rock and helped him move her body, but declined to name the other individual.	Murdered	Not found
1995	Julie Lejeune	8	Belgium	Eight-year-old friends Julie Lejeune and Mélissa Russo were reported missing by their families on June 24, 1995, after they left the Russo family home in Grâce-Hollogne, Belgium, and did not return. Their bodies were found buried in the garden of a house in Sars-la-Buissière on August 17, 1996. After being kidnapped, they had been held in Marc Dutroux's house in Marcinelle for between five and nine months. Locked in the basement, the girls starved to death, Dutroux's wife having neglected them while her husband was in police custody between December 1995 and March 1996.	Homicide caused by neglect	2 years
1995	Mélissa Russo	8	Belgium		Homicide caused by neglect	2 years
1995	Jason Callahan	19	United States of America	Callahan made no contact with friends or family after June 1995. The body of a passenger that was found in the wreck of a car on June 26, 1995, was identified as his on December 9, 2015, after his mother formally reported him missing.	Died in automobile accident	20 years
1995	Yolanda Panek	21	United States of America	Panek was an American woman who vanished from the Capri Motel in Portland, Oregon. Even though her body was never found, there is physical evidence exists to indicate she was murdered in the hotel room and her body transported from the residence in her vehicle. Panek's common-law husband, Abdur Rashid Al-Wadud, was charged and convicted of her murder in March 1996.	Murdered	10 months
1995	Eefje Lambrecks	19	Belgium	Eefje Lambrecks and An Marchal, from Hasselt, Belgium, were on holiday on the Flemish coast with a group of friends when they disappeared on the night of August 22–23, 1995. The pair took a tram to Blankenberge where they attended a hypnosis show, and did not return to their holiday home in Westende. On September 3, 1996, their bodies were found buried in the garden of a house in Jumet. Marc Dutroux and his accomplice Michel Lelièvre had kidnapped the teenagers and brought them to Dutroux's house in Marcinelle. After being kidnapped, Lambrecks and Marchal had been buried alive.	Murdered	1 year
1995	An Marchal	17	Belgium		Murdered	1 year
1995	Madalyn Murray O'Hair	76	United States of America	Madalyn Murray O'Hair, an American activist, founder of American Atheists, and the organization's president from 1963 to 1986, disappeared on August 27, 1995, and was found dead in 2001.	Murdered	6 years
1995	Avdo Palić	37	Bosnia and Herzegovina	Bosnian military officer who was detained by Bosnian Serb Army soldiers on September 5, 1995, and promptly disappeared. His remains were first located in a mass grave in November 2001, but were not positively identified until late July 2009.	Murdered	14 years
1995	Jaswant Singh Khalra	43	India	Khalra was an Indian Sikh human rights activist who received global acclaim for his research into approximately 27,000 illegal killings perpetrated by the Punjabi police during the 1990s. In response to his investigation, he was kidnapped by seven officials on September 6, 1995, and detained at the police station in Jhabal, where he was presumably killed.	Murdered	Body never found
1995	Jimmy Ryce	9	United States of America	Ryce, a child who was abducted on September 11, 1995, was raped and killed by Juan Carlos Chavez in Redland, Florida, and his body was found three months later near Chavez's trailer.	Murdered	3 months
1995	Nicole van den Hurk	15	Netherlands	Nicole van den Hurk disappeared on her way to work in Eindhoven, in the Dutch province of North Brabant on October 6, 1995, and was found dead on November 22, 1995, in the woods between the towns of Mierlo and Lierop.	Manslaughter	7 weeks
1995	Bernard Weinstein	43	Belgium	Weinstein, a Frenchman living in Belgium, was last seen alive in mid-November 1995. His body was found buried in the garden of a house in Sars-la-Buissière on August 17, 1996. Weinstein had been sought by police since he and Marc Dutroux kidnapped three people, one of whom had escaped and alerted the police. To stop Weinstein from informing on him, Dutroux kidnapped Weinstein and killed him by burying him alive.	Murdered	2 years
1995	Roxanne Ellis	53	United States of America	A lesbian couple who were murdered in Medford, Oregon by Robert Acremant.	Murdered	4 days
1995	Michelle Abdill	42	United States of America	A lesbian couple who were murdered in Medford, Oregon by Robert Acremant.	Murdered	4 days
1995	Barbara Barnes	13	United States of America	Barnes, an American schoolgirl, was kidnapped on December 7, 1995, while walking to school, and her body was found on February 22, 1996, in Pennsylvania. People have speculated that her uncle may have been responsible for her death, but others believe that the crime was committed by someone local.	Murdered	3 months
1995	Petrisi Losi	20	Greece	The two young men went missing and were murdered by serial killer Yanis Baltass.	Murdered	2 months
1995	Paugin Legisi	25	Greece	The two young men went missing and were murdered by serial killer Yanis Baltass.	Murdered	2 months
1995	Céline Figard	19	United Kingdom	Figard was a French woman who, while visiting the United Kingdom, disappeared on December 19, 1995. She was found dead on December 29, 1995.	Murdered	10 days
1995	Justina Morales	8	United States of America	Morales, an American girl from the Bedford-Stuyvesant section of Brooklyn, New York, who was killed by her mother's boyfriend, Luis Santiago, on December 31, 1995. Her disappearance went unnoticed for 15 months. In 1997, Santiago was convicted for the murder. Morales' body has not been found.	Murdered	2 years

=== 1996 ===
Date	Person(s)	Age	Country of disappearance	Circumstances	Outcome	Time spent missing or unconfirmed
1996	Ivan Mishukov	4	Russia	After going missing he was feral child who lived with dogs between the ages of four and six.	Found alive	2 years
1996	Robert Ronald Soden	30	United States	A suspected victim of convicted murderer Daniel Conahan, Soden disappeared at age 30 sometime in 1996; his remains were among eight discovered in Fort Myers in March 2007.	Murdered	11 years
1996	Nancy Ann Mueller	28	United States	Three individuals murdered by Chevie Kehoe and Daniel Lewis Lee in the commission of a robbery at their Arkansas home on January 11, 1996. All three died of suffocation. Their bodies were discovered in Russellville in June 1996.	Murdered	5 months
1996	William Frederick Mueller	52	United States	Three individuals murdered by Chevie Kehoe and Daniel Lewis Lee in the commission of a robbery at their Arkansas home on January 11, 1996. All three died of suffocation. Their bodies were discovered in Russellville in June 1996.	Murdered	5 months
1996	Sarah Elizabeth Powell	8	United States	Three individuals murdered by Chevie Kehoe and Daniel Lewis Lee in the commission of a robbery at their Arkansas home on January 11, 1996. All three died of suffocation. Their bodies were discovered in Russellville in June 1996.	Murdered	5 months
1996	José Antonio Ortega Lara	38	Spain	Spanish prison officer who was kidnapped by ETA terrorists on January 17, 1996, while en route to his job. He was kept in detention and tortured in a dungeon up until he was rescued by the Spanish police forces. He later enrolled in politics, and now heads the Vox party.	Found alive	1 year
1996	Tanya Nicole Kach	14	United States of America	Tanya Nicole Kach, a student at the Cornell Middle School in McKeesport, Pennsylvania, was kidnapped by school security guard Thomas Hose on February 10, 1996. In the time leading up to this event, Hose befriended Kach to earn her trust. Kach escaped on March 21, 2006, with the help of Joe Sparico, the owner of a grocery store in the neighborhood where Kach had been held captive.	Found alive	10 years
1996	Karen Ann Vergata	34	United States	A suspected victim of the Gilgo Beach serial killings. Vergata disappeared on or about February 14, 1996. Sections of her body were discovered in April 1996 and April 2011 respectively.	Murdered	2 months
1996	Robert Wykel	65	United States of America	Sheet metal worker who was supposedly killed by associate Myron Wynn on February 23, 1996, while the pair were on a trip to buy a car in Yelm, Washington. Wykel's body was never found, but Wynn has been convicted and sentenced to 20 years' imprisonment.	Murdered	Never found
1996	Julie Marie Harris	12	United States of America	A possible victim of Israel Keyes. Harris disappeared while waiting for a ride to a local church in Colville, Washington, on March 2, 1996. Her remains were found in April 1997.	Murdered	1 year
1996	William John Melaragno	35	United States of America	On March 7, 1996, a man travelling down Route 75 in North Port, Florida, pulled off onto Laramie Circle and found naked male corpse positioned face-up in the shape of a cross. The victim remained unidentified until June 30, 1999, when he was identified as 35-year-old William John "Bill" Melaragno.	Murdered	3 years
1996	Nadezhda Chaikova	33	Russia	Correspondent for the Russian weekly newspaper Obshchaya Gazeta who frequently travelled to Chechnya to record events in the region. On March 20, 1996, she was kidnapped by unidentified gunmen in Sernovodskoye, and her body found later in the Urus-Martanovsky District. She had been shot to death.	Murdered	3 weeks
1996	Kristin Smart	19	United States of America	Smart was a California Polytechnic State University student murdered on or about May 25, 1996 by Paul Flores. She was declared legally dead May 25, 2002. Her disappearance and the lack of effective initial response ultimately inspired the passing of a law requiring public colleges reporting cases involving any form of violence against students, or the possibility of such violence.	Murdered	Never found
1996	Sabine Dardenne	12	Belgium	Dardenne was kidnapped in Tournai, Belgium, by Marc Dutroux and Michel Lelièvre as she cycled to school on May 28, 1996. When Dutroux and Lelièvre were arrested in August after kidnapping 14-year-old Laetitia Delhez, police raided Dutroux's home on August 15 and found both girls alive in the basement.	Found alive	3 months
1996	Melanie Hall	25	United Kingdom	Melanie Hall, a British hospital clerical officer from Bradford on Avon, who disappeared on June 9, 1996. On October 5, 2009, her partial remains were discovered, after a plastic bin bag containing human bones was located by a workman on the M5 motorway near Thornbury, South Gloucestershire. The bones, which included a pelvis, thigh bone, and human skull, were analyzed and identified as belonging to Hall.	Murdered	13 years
1996	Ulrike Everts	13	Germany	German Ulrike Everts was last seen in a pony-drawn carriage on June 11, 1996. In July 1998, Ronny Rieken, arrested for the murder of 11-year-old Christina Nytsch, confessed to killing Everts and directed police to the location where he had hidden her body.	Murdered	2 years
1996	Egbert Rimkus	34	United States of America	A family of four German tourists (two adults and two children) disappeared July 23, 1996, in a remote area of Death Valley in California after their rental van broke down. Their remains were discovered in November 2009 by two off-duty search-and-rescue hikers who had been looking for them as a cold-case hobby.	Death by misadventure	13 years
1996	Cornelia Meyer	27	United States of America	A family of four German tourists (two adults and two children) disappeared July 23, 1996, in a remote area of Death Valley in California after their rental van broke down. Their remains were discovered in November 2009 by two off-duty search-and-rescue hikers who had been looking for them as a cold-case hobby.	Death by misadventure	13 years
1996	Georg Weber	11	United States of America	A family of four German tourists (two adults and two children) disappeared July 23, 1996, in a remote area of Death Valley in California after their rental van broke down. Their remains were discovered in November 2009 by two off-duty search-and-rescue hikers who had been looking for them as a cold-case hobby.	Death by misadventure	13 years
1996	Max Meyer	4	United States of America	A family of four German tourists (two adults and two children) disappeared July 23, 1996, in a remote area of Death Valley in California after their rental van broke down. Their remains were discovered in November 2009 by two off-duty search-and-rescue hikers who had been looking for them as a cold-case hobby.	Death by misadventure	13 years
1996	Laetitia Delhez	14	Belgium	Delhez was kidnapped by Marc Dutroux and Michel Lelièvre as she walked home from a swimming pool in Bertrix, Belgium, on August 9, 1996. An eyewitness who was present at the scene of the kidnapping was able to tell the police part of Dutroux's van's numberplate. After Dutroux and Lelièvre confessed to kidnapping Delhez, police raided Dutroux's home on August 15 and found Delhez and Sabine Dardenne alive in the basement.	Found alive	6 days
1996	Janet March	33	United States of America	March was an American children's book illustrator who vanished under mysterious circumstances from Forest Hills, Tennessee on August 15, 1996. Her family reported her missing two weeks later, and in the ensuing investigation, her husband was arrested, convicted and sentenced to 56 years' imprisonment for her murder. Despite this, March's body has never been found.	Murdered	10 years
1996	Sofia Silva	16	United States of America	Abducted from the porch of her home in Spotsylvania County, Virginia by serial killer Richard Evonitz. Her body was discovered in King George County one month later.	Murdered	1 month
1996	Tegan Lee Lane	2 days	Australia	Tegan was the daughter of former Australian water polo player and teacher Keli Lane, who was convicted of the child's murder approximately two days after giving birth to her. Tegan Lee's body has never been found.	Murdered	Never found
1996	Karyn Hearn Slover	23	United States of America	Slover disappeared on September 27, 1996, in Decatur, Illinois, shortly after leaving her job at the Decatur Herald & Review, and her dismembered body was discovered wrapped in plastic bags sealed with duct tape in Lake Shelbyville on October 1, 1996.	Murdered	4 days
1996	Angela Atim Lakor	14	Uganda	Ugandan students at the Saint Mary's College Aboke boarding school were among those abducted by members of the Lord's Resistance Army in October 1996. Lakor was kept as a sex slave and married off to a captor in Sudan, but was eventually rescued in 2012. She later became a community activist and founded an organization dedicated to helping fellow abductees.	Found alive	16 years (Lakor)/8 years (Nyanjura)
1996	Victoria Nyanjura	14	Uganda	Ugandan students at the Saint Mary's College Aboke boarding school were among those abducted by members of the Lord's Resistance Army in October 1996. Lakor was kept as a sex slave and married off to a captor in Sudan, but was eventually rescued in 2012. She later became a community activist and founded an organization dedicated to helping fellow abductees.	Found alive	16 years (Lakor)/8 years (Nyanjura)
1996	Jakub Fiszman	39	Germany	Fiszman, a millionaire German businessman from Frankfurt am Main, disappeared in Eschborn, Germany, on October 1, 1996, and his body was found on October 19, 1996, in the Taunus mountains, after a massive search operation involving some 500 police officers.	Murdered	18 days
1996	Heather Rich	16	United States of America	High school student who was sexually assaulted, raped and killed by a trio of students from her school on October 2, 1996. Her body was found on October 10, 1996. All three of the perpretraitors were later sentenced to life imprisonment.	Murdered	8 days
1996	April Lacy	14	United States of America	Lacy, a girl from Oklahoma City, Oklahoma, disappeared on October 3, 1996, and was found dead on October 8, 1996, in Decatur, Texas. Her body was not identified until 1998.	Murdered	2 years
1996	Vera Holland	47	United Kingdom	Mother-of-three Holland vanished after leaving her home in Reading, Berkshire, England, on the evening of 14 November 1996 to make the three-minute walk to the nearby KFC restaurant. There was no sign of her on CCTV reaching her destination and it's believed that she never made it to the restaurant. Her body was discovered two days later after a fire was reported by motorists on a roadside three miles south of her home. Her body was found burning in the fire. As of 2021, her murder remains unsolved.	Murdered	2 days
1996	Juli Busken	21	United States of America	21-year-old Juli Busken, a University of Oklahoma dance student and resident of Benton, Arkansas, was abducted from her apartment's parking lot and subsequently raped and shot to death by an unknown assailant. The case remained unsolved for eight years before Anthony Castillo Sanchez, a 25-year-old convicted burglar, was arrested after the DNA profile of the killer was matched to his DNA. Sanchez was convicted and sentenced to death for murdering Busken, and executed on 21 September 2023.	Murdered	1 day
1996	St. Mary's College students	Various	Uganda	The Aboke abductions refers to the abduction of 139 female students from a boarding school in Aboke, Uganda, perpetrated by the Lord's Resistance Army. While a number of the hostages died in captivity, the rest of them were released following negotiations, with the last one returning to her family in 2009.	Released/Died in captivity	Various

=== 1997 ===
Date	Person(s)	Age	Country of disappearance	Circumstances	Outcome	Time spent missing or unconfirmed
1997	Amber Creek	14	United States of America	Creek, a girl from Palatine, Illinois ran away from a youth shelter in January 1997, and was found dead on February 9, 1997, and was not identified until a year later.	Murdered	1 year
1997	Silvia Melis	28	Ogliastra, Sardinia	Melis was the victim of a kidnapping for extortion which occurred on 19 February 1997 in Ogliastra, Sardinia. She was discovered alive close to Nuoro on November 11 the same year by two plainclothes agents, having endured 265 days of captivity. Although controversy remains regarding the circumstances of her release, Melis has always insisted she freed herself.	Rescued	265 days
1997	Ebrahim Zalzadeh	47–48	Iran	Ebrahim Zalzadeh was an Iranian editor and author who mysteriously disappeared on February 22, 1997, and was found dead on March 29, 1997, in Tehran.	Murdered	35 days
1997	Laura Smither	12	United States	12-year-old Laura Smither was last seen alive in Friendswood, Texas on April 3, 1997, jogging down her home street after telling her mother she was going on a 20-minute run. Seventeen days later, on April 20, 1997, Smither's body was found in a retention pond in Pasadena, Texas. In 1998, her parents established the Laura Recovery Center, a non-profit organization that aids the search for and recovery of kidnapping victims. In June 2022, William Lewis Reece was convicted of the murders of Laura Smither, Kelli Cox and Jessica Cain in June 2022.	Murdered	17 days
1997	Gregory Malnory	25	United States	A young couple murdered at South Florida Sod Farm in Charlotte County, Florida. Their killer was sentenced to death in 1999, and was executed on February 13, 2025, at the Florida State Prison.	Murdered	1 day
1997	Kimberly Malnory	26	United States	A young couple murdered at South Florida Sod Farm in Charlotte County, Florida. Their killer was sentenced to death in 1999, and was executed on February 13, 2025, at the Florida State Prison.	Murdered	1 day
1997	Judy Smith	50	United States of America	Smith, a nurse, was last seen by her husband at a hotel in Philadelphia around April 10, 1997, but her bones were found nearly six months later in Pisgah National Forest. It is unclear how Smith reached North Carolina, and her killing remains unsolved.	Murdered	Almost 6 months
1997	Pai Hsiao-yen	16	Taiwan	Japanese-Taiwanese school student abducted from her school in Taipei on April 14, 1997, by a gang of criminals who later demanded $5 million in ransom. She was murdered a week after her abduction, with her mutilated body found two weeks later in an irrigation ditch.	Murdered	2 weeks
1997	Eva Blanco	16	Spain	Spanish high school student who disappeared while walking home on a detour from the town center in Algete on April 19, 1997. Her body, showing several stab wounds, was found by an elderly couple on the next day. The case remained unsolved until 2015, when DNA linked Moroccan-Spanish deliveryman Ahmed Chelh Gerj to the crime. Chelh committed suicide in the middle of trial proceedings.	Murdered	1 day
1997	Zephany Nurse	2 days	South Africa	Nurse, a South African female, was abducted on April 30, 1997, from a hospital two days after she was born and raised by her abductor. At age 17 she was, by coincidence, attending the same school as her younger sister, and their physical resemblance was noticed. DNA testing confirmed her identity.	Found alive	17 years
1997	Kerry Whelan	39	Australia	Whelan was last seen entering a Mitsubishi Pajero with her murderer, Bruce Burrell, on May 6, 1997. Burrell had been a friend and former employee of the Whelan family. Her murderer refused to disclose the location of her body, which has never been found.	Murdered	Not found
1997	William Charles Patten	24	United States of America	On May 22, 1997, a skeleton was found in Port Charlotte, Florida. A county construction worker was clearing brush on a dirt path when he discovered skeletal remains under a pepper tree near Quesada Avenue. Ten months later, on March 16, 1998, DNA identified the remains as 24-year-old William "Billy" Charles Patten, who had disappeared in 1993.	Murdered	4 years
1997	Jeff Buckley	30	United States of America	Jeff Buckley, an American singer known for his only studio album, "Grace", which was released in 1994, including his hit song, a cover of Leonard Cohens "Hallelujah." On 29 May 1997, Buckley disappeared after going for a swim in Wolf River Harbour while fully clothed, accompanied by roadie named Keith Foti. Foti moved his boombox away from the edge of the water, and when he looked back up, he was unable to spot Buckley in the water. On June 4, passengers on the boat named "American Queen" spotted his body caught in some branches, upstream from where he had disappeared. His autopsy states that there was no drugs or alcohol in system, and his death was ruled an accidental drowning.	Accidental Drowning	6 days
1997	Tanya Jackson	26	United States of America	The woman formerly known as "Peaches" was found dead in Lakeview, New York. In 2025, she was identified as Tanya Jackson who went missing in June 1997, and is a suspected victim of the Long Island Serial Killer.	Murdered	3 days
1997	Gary DeVore	55	United States of America	DeVore, a Hollywood screenwriter best known for the movie Raw Deal, disappeared on June 28, 1997, and a year later he and his car was discovered submerged in the California Aqueduct in Palmdale, California with his hands removed.	Murdered	1 year
1997	Kelli Ann Cox	20	United States	20-year-old Kelli Ann Cox was last seen alive on July 15, 1997, at a Connoco gas station and convenience store in Denton, Texas after locking herself out of her car and making a call to her boyfriend for help using the station's outdoor payphone. Over 18 years later, on March 18, 2016, Kelli's remains were discovered after suspected serial killer William Lewis Reece directed investigators to search an area in Brazoria County, Texas. Reece confessed to and was convicted of the murders of Laura Smither, Kelli Cox, and Jessica Cain in June 2022.	Murdered	18 years
1997	Harold Pugh	41	United States of America	A father and son shot to death in the Cane Creek Canyon Nature Preserve by bank robbers on July 20, 1997. Their bodies were found later in the day at the creek. Two of the Pughs' murderers were sentenced to death, whereas two others were sentenced to life imprisonment.	Murdered	1 day
1997	Joey Pugh	11	United States of America	A father and son shot to death in the Cane Creek Canyon Nature Preserve by bank robbers on July 20, 1997. Their bodies were found later in the day at the creek. Two of the Pughs' murderers were sentenced to death, whereas two others were sentenced to life imprisonment.	Murdered	1 day
1997	Jessica Lee Cain	17	United States	17-year-old Jessica Lee Cain was last seen alive at the Bennigan's restaurant near Baybrook Mall in Clear Lake, Texas. She was reported missing on August 17, 1997, when her father found her truck abandoned along Interstate 45. On March 18, 2016, Cain's remains were discovered in a field near Hobby Airport after suspected serial killer William Lewis Reece directed investigators to the site. Reece confessed to and was convicted of the murders of Laura Smither, Kelli Cox, and Jessica Cain in June 2022.	Murdered	18 years
1997	Marijoy Chiong	Unknown	Philippines	Filipino sisters who were kidnapped, raped and ultimately murdered by a gang of seven men in Cebu City on July 16, 1997. Marijoy's body was supposedly found two days later, while Jacqueline's has never been located. Their killers were all arrested and served a variety of sentences for their respective roles.	Murdered	2 days
1997	Jacqueline Chiong	Unknown	Philippines	Filipino sisters who were kidnapped, raped and ultimately murdered by a gang of seven men in Cebu City on July 16, 1997. Marijoy's body was supposedly found two days later, while Jacqueline's has never been located. Their killers were all arrested and served a variety of sentences for their respective roles.	Murdered	Not found
1997	Silvia Olivetti	21	Italy	Two sisters and their friend went missing on an excursion at Montagne del Morrone, in Abruzzo. They were attacked and shot by a Macedonian shepherd Halivebi Hasani.	Survived	1 day
1997	Diana Olivetti	23	Italy	Two sisters and their friend went missing on an excursion at Montagne del Morrone, in Abruzzo. They were attacked and shot by a Macedonian shepherd Halivebi Hasani.	Murdered	1 day
1997	Tamara Gobbo	23	Italy	Two sisters and their friend went missing on an excursion at Montagne del Morrone, in Abruzzo. They were attacked and shot by a Macedonian shepherd Halivebi Hasani.	Murdered	1 day
1997	Unnamed 53-year-old Vietnamese woman	53	United States	A 53-year-old Vietnamese woman, a foreign refugee who spoke little English, was abducted by serial rapist-kidnapper John Jamelske on August 21, 1997. She was forced into Jamelske's car and taken to an abandoned house, where he raped her. Jamelske then tied the woman to a stack of flattened cardboard boxes and drove her to his house, where he held her captive, raped her daily, and forced her to fulfill various menial tasks for him. Jamelske released the woman on May 23, 1998, at a Greyhound bus station, with $50; she reported to the police that day. Jamelske later pleaded guilty to five counts of first-degree kidnapping, and in July 2003 was sentenced to 18 years to life in prison.	Released	9 months
1997	Ricky Reel	21	United Kingdom	A computer science student at Brunel University, Reel was last seen alive in the early morning of 15 October; his body was recovered from the River Thames six days later. Although the Metropolitan Police initially declared his death accidental, an open verdict was later returned. Speculation remains as to a possible racial motive behind his death.	Died (open verdict)	6 days
1997	Maryann Measles	13	United States	A 13-year old from New Milford, Connecticut, was abducted from the parking lot of a local shopping center on October 19, 1997, while waiting in the car for her mother. The abductor brought Measles to a secluded area along the Housatonic River, where a group of eight former friends proceeded to beat, gang-rape, and murder the young girl. Her body was wrapped in a blanket and chains before being dumped into the river. Maryann was missing for nearly nine months until the following spring, when her remains were found floating near a boat launch at Lake Lillinonah.	Murdered	8 months and 3 weeks
1997	Walter Kwok	47	Hong Kong	Hong Kong real estate developer who was kidnapped by gangster Cheung Tze-keung on September 30, 1997. Held for ransom of HK$600 million, Kwok was blindfolded and kept in a wooden container for half of his detention, he was later released after his wife paid the ransom. Kwok sustained psychological trauma from the event, while Tze-keung was later captured and executed in China the following year.	Found alive	1 week
1997	Stephanie Mahaney	13	United States	On October 15, 1997, Mahaney was kidnapped from her bed in Springfield, Missouri. Her body was found in a farm pond on November 18, 1997. Serial killer Tommy Lynn Sells was suspected of the crime.	Murdered	1 month
1997	William Earl Moldt	40	United States of America	William Moldt somehow drove his car unnoticed into the canal in the Grand Isles neighbourhood of Wellington, Florida on November 7, 1997. His car was spotted by a man looking at a Google Earth image in late August 2019 and his remains were recovered from the canal on August 28 of that year.	Presumably drowned	22 years
1997	Reena Virk	14	Canada	Virk went missing on November 14, 1997, and was found dead on November 22, 1997, Warren Glowatski and Kelly Ellard were charged with murdering Virk and were found guilty.	Murdered	8 days
1997	Nicholas Wright	18	United Kingdom	18-year-old sailor in the Royal Navy Nicholas Wright disappeared from Portsmouth on 12 December 1997. He had last been seen in a nightclub with fellow Royal Navy sailor Allan Grimson, who has previously been known to have made unwanted advances towards Wright. Grimson was later arrested and led police to the body of Wright and another of his victims in December 1999. Grimson, a homosexual, had murdered Wright after taking him back to his flat and attempting to advance on him sexually before being rebuked, which enraged him (Wright was not homosexual). Grimson is the prime suspect in the disappearance of Simon Parkes in Gibraltar in 1986, in part because his known victims were killed on 12 December, and Parkes was also killed on this date when Grimson was known to have been in Gibraltar with the Royal Navy. Grimson is now eligible for parole and is currently being held in an open prison.	Murdered	2 years
1997	Yvette Sophia Mueller	19	United States of America	Mueller disappeared in Las Vegas on December 14, 1997. She was never found but serial killer Tommy Lynn Sells was found responsible.	Murdered	Never found

=== 1998 ===
Date	Person(s)	Age	Country of disappearance	Circumstances	Outcome	Time spent missing or unconfirmed
1998	Unnamed Japanese man	69	Japan	Unnamed Japanese man was a man who died in his home in 1998 in Japan from unknown reasons and was found dead in 2000 when people entered his home.	Unknown	3 years
1998	Jennifer Long	16	United States of America	A teenager murdered by double murderer Wesley Ira Purkey. Long was lured into Purkey's vehicle and driven to his home where she was raped, then stabbed to death. Her body was dismembered, then incinerated. Purkey confessed to Long's murder in an effort to serve a life sentence in a federal prison as opposed to a state prison. He was later convicted of Long's murder and sentenced to death. Purkey was executed at United States Penitentiary, Terre Haute in July 2020.	Murdered	Not found
1998	Vincent Cochetel	Unknown	Russia	French UNHCR official who was kidnapped by three armed men on January 29, 1998, out of the organization's office in Vladikavkaz, Russia. While in captivity, he was kept in a cave and was regularly abused, until he was rescued by security forces in December 1998.	Found alive	10 months
1998	Natascha Kampusch	10	Austria	Natascha Kampusch, an Austrian girl, who was kidnapped on her way to school in March 1998, was locked in a cellar, and escaped on August 23, 2006.	Found alive	8 years
1998	Patricia Lee Partin	40	United States of America	Partin was among four women who left Los Angeles, California and disappeared alongside Florinda Donner in 1998; her remains were found in the desert sands of Death Valley in 2003	Died (cause unknown)	5 years
1998	Lois Roberts	39	Australia	Roberts, a woman from Australia disappeared outside the Nimbin Police Station on July 31, 1998, and her dismembered remains were found in the Whian Whian Forest on the mid-NSW north coast in January 1999.	Murdered	5 months
1998	Natasha Ryan	14	Australia	Ryan, an Australian teenage girl who went missing in 1998, was found hiding in a wardrobe at her boyfriend's home in 2003.	Found alive	5 years
1998	Ben Smart	21	New Zealand	Ben Smart and Olivia Hope, New Zealand party goers last seen in the early hours of January 1, 1998, who disappeared in mysterious circumstances in the Marlborough Sounds. Scott Watson was arrested for and convicted of their murder, but the verdict remains controversial and no trace of Smart or Hope has ever been discovered.	Murdered	Never found
1998	Olivia Hope	17	New Zealand	Ben Smart and Olivia Hope, New Zealand party goers last seen in the early hours of January 1, 1998, who disappeared in mysterious circumstances in the Marlborough Sounds. Scott Watson was arrested for and convicted of their murder, but the verdict remains controversial and no trace of Smart or Hope has ever been discovered.	Murdered	Never found
1998	Rukhsana Naz	19	United Kingdom	Naz was a 19-year-old British Pakistani woman and mother-of-two from Normanton, Derby, who was murdered by family members in an honour killing on 26 March 1998. Her body was discovered in Denby Dale, West Yorkshire, five days after her murder.	Murdered	5 days
1998	Arlene Fraser	33	United Kingdom	Fraser disappeared from her home in Elgin, Scotland in April 1998. Her husband was known to have previously attempted to murder her. He was convicted of her murder in 2000, despite her body having not been found.	Murdered	Not found
1998	Dimitris Liantinis	55	Greece	Liantinis, a Greek philosopher and professor at the University of Athens who disappeared on June 1, 1998. In July 2005 human bones were found in the area of the mountain Taygetos; forensic examinations verified that it was the body of Liantinis. No lethal substances were found to determine the cause of death.	Died by suicide	7 years
1998	Christina Marie Williams	13	United States of America	Schoolgirl who was kidnapped on June 12, 1998, while walking her dog in Fort Ord. Her body was found months later, with authorities determining that she had been killed. In 2016, longtime suspect Charles Holifield was arrested, later charged and sentenced to life imprisonment without parole for her murder.	Murdered	7 months
1998	Kamiyah Mobley	8 hours	United States of America	Mobley was abducted on July 10, 1998, from a hospital in Jacksonville, Florida shortly after her birth and was recovered 18 years later after having been raised by her alleged abductor.	Found alive	18 years
1998	Nicky Verstappen	11	Netherlands	On the morning of August 10, 1998, 11-year-old Nicky Verstappen disappeared from a summer camp he was attending in Brunssum, Limburg. His body was found on the evening of August 11, 1.2 kilometers (0.75 mi) away in Landgraaf, and a murder investigation was subsequently launched. Despite extensive investigation, the case remained unsolved for over twenty years.	Murdered	1 day
1998	Jhon Frank Pinchao	28	Colombia	Colombian policeman and Second Lieutenant who was one of the 60 people kidnapped and taken as hostage by FARC during their attack on Mitú on November 1, 1998. Pinchao managed to escape into the jungle on April 28, 2007, wandering for seventeen days until he was located by an indigenous tribe who escorted him to safety.	Found alive	9 years
1998	Mohammad-Ja'far Pouyandeh	44	Iran	Mohammad-Ja'far Pouyandeh was an Iranian, an activist, a writer, and also did translating. Pouyandeh disappeared in Shahriar County, which is located in Tehran after leaving his house on December 8, 1998, and was found dead just three days later on December 11.	Murdered	3 days
1998	Katarzyna Zowada	28	Poland	Katarzyna Zowada was a female student at the Jagiellonian University who disappeared from Nowa Huta on November 12, 1998, and on January 6, 1999, some of her remains were found in a river in Vistula. Eight days later some more of her remains were found.	Murdered	1 month and 3 weeks
1998	Sion Jenkins	20	United Kingdom	20-year-old Royal Navy sailor Sion Jenkins disappeared from the port of Portsmouth on December 12, 1998. He was last seen in a nightclub in the city. A suspect arrested by police, fellow Royal Navy sailor Allan Grimson, led officers to his body in December 1999. It emerged that Grimson, a homosexual, had taken the heavily intoxicated Jenkins back to his flat and forced him to have sex with him after threatening him (Jenkins was not a homosexual). The next morning Jenkins had asked to leave but Grimson beat him to death with a baseball bat. Grimson, described by his trial judge as "a serial killer in nature if not in number", had also killed another sailor in the city exactly one year earlier, and is the prime suspect in the disappearance of Simon Parkes from Gibraltar in 1986, as Grimson was known to be in the port with the navy at the time and Parkes also disappeared on 12 December. Grimson is now eligible for parole and is being held in open prison conditions with day release provisions.	Murdered	1 year
1998	Lynsey Quy	21	United Kingdom	21-year-old Lynsey Quy disappeared from her home in Southport and her dismembered body was found buried at a local amusement park in June 2000. Her husband Mitchell Quy was convicted of the murder.	Murdered	2 years and 6 months
1998	Kirsty Bentley	15	New Zealand	Bentley, a teenage girl in Ashburton, New Zealand, disappeared on December 31, 1998, while walking her family dog in the afternoon. After an extensive search lasting two weeks, her body was found in dense scrub approximately 40 km away. Police consider the case to be a homicide, and it remains one of the highest-profile cold cases in New Zealand. Her killer has never been identified.	Murdered	2 weeks

=== 1999 ===
Date	Person(s)	Age	Country of disappearance	Circumstances	Outcome	Time spent missing or unconfirmed
1999	Tulay Goren	15	United Kingdom	Turkish-born teenager who was killed by her father on January 7, 1999, in an honor killing at the family home in Woodford Green. While her body was never found, her father, who was convicted in 2009, admitted that he had dismembered the corpse and placed the remains in garbage bags which were thrown away.	Murdered	10 years and 11 months
1999	Izabela Lewicka	21	United States of America	A victim of serial killer John Edward Robinson. Lewicka was murdered in Kansas sometime in 1999; her body was discovered concealed inside a drum upon upon Robinson's farm the following year.	Murdered	10 years and 11 months
1999	Hae Min Lee	18	United States of America	Hae Min Lee was a Korean-American high school student who disappeared from Baltimore County, Maryland on January 13, 1999, and was found dead a month later in Leakin Park. It was revealed that she was strangled to death.	Murdered	1 month
1999	Marcella Davis	19	United Kingdom	Sex worker and mother Marcella Davis disappeared from the red light district of Wolverhampton on February 7, 1999. At 9.11pm that night she rang her babysitter and said that she would return to her home at 11 p.m., but the call was suddenly disconnected. In April a suspect arrested by police confessed and led police to the location where he had burned her body, and the remains were identified as belonging to her. She had been killed by serial killer Paul Brumfitt, who had previously been released from prison for killing two men.	Murdered	2 months
1999	Ingrid Washinawatok	41	Colombia	American Menominee human rights activist who was kidnapped together with two colleagues on February 25, 1999, while en route to help set up a school for the U'wa people in Arauca Department, Colombia. The trio's abductors, FARC guerillas, killed them and later dumped their bodies across the border in Venezuela.	Murdered	1 week
1999	William DaShawn Hamilton	6	United States of America	The remains of six-year-old William DaShawn Hamilton were discovered by a cemetery worker in a wooded area near a church cemetery in DeKalb County, Georgia, on February 26, 1999, though they remained unidentified until June 13, 2022, when it was also announced that Hamilton's mother, Teresa Ann Bailey Black, had been arrested in connection with his death. Black was charged with multiple counts, including felony murder, though was acquitted of all but one charge and sentenced to 10 years in prison in January 2024.	Found deceased	23 years
1999	Juan Manuel Corzo Román	38	Colombia	Colombian politician and member of the Chamber of Representatives who was kidnapped along with 39 other passengers on a flight between Bucaramanga and Cúcuta by ELN militants on April 12, 1999. He was held in captivity until his eventual release in September 2000.	Found alive	17 months
1999	Fan Man-yee	23	Hong Kong	Man-yee was a nightclub hostess who was abducted from a housing estate in Kwai Chung, Hong Kong, on March 17, 1999. She was tortured, raped and sexually humiliated by four individuals while confined in an apartment in Tsim Sha Tsui, Kowloon before succumbing to her injuries on or about April 14, 1999. Her body was later dismembered, with her head later sewn inside a Hello Kitty doll. The case is also known as the Hello Kitty murder case.	Murdered	1 month
1999	Mary Beatrice Perez	9	United States of America	Nine-year-old Mary Beatrice Perez was kidnapped from a market festival in San Antonio, Texas, driven to a stockyard, raped, and strangled to death with her T-shirt. Her body was found in a creek ten days later and serial killer Tommy Lynn Sells was later found responsible.	Murdered	10 days
1999	Marianne Vaatstra	16	Netherlands	Vaatstra was kidnapped while cycling to her parents' house in Kollum, Netherlands on April 30, 1999. The next day, her body was found in a field close to Veenklooster, with signs of sexual aggression and her throat slit. For a long time, the killing was pinned on asylum seekers, but with the help of DNA profiling, police identified the killer as local farmer Jasper Steringa, who was charged and subsequently convicted for the killing.	Murdered	1 day
1999	Debbie Griggs	34	United Kingdom	Griggs was a 34-year-old housewife who disappeared from her family home in Deal, Kent, on May 5, 1999. She was murdered by her husband, Andrew, shortly after discovering he had been grooming an underage girl and her body buried within a garden. Her remains were only discovered in 2022.	Murdered	23 years
1999	Fehmi Agani	67	FR Yugoslavia	Kosovar sociologist, politician and leading strategist for the Democratic League of Kosovo who was abducted by Yugoslav security forces while attempting to escape into Macedonia on May 6, 1999. His body was found in Lipljan several days later.	Murdered	Several days
1999	William Cutolo	49	United States of America	An Italian-American mobster and member of the Colombo crime family. Cutolo was murdered by fellow mobsters on May 26, 1999. His body was buried in East Farmingdale, New York, and remained undiscovered until October 2008.	Murdered	9 years
1999	Haley Alison McHone	13	United States of America	A victim of serial killer Tommy Lynn Sells. McHone was kidnapped and dragged into a wooded area, where she was raped, then strangled to death with her own T-shirt. McHone had been playing upon a swing when Sells encountered her.	Murdered	10 days
1999	Yin Jianhua	35	China	A victim of Chinese serial killers Fa Ziying and Lao Rongzhi. Jianhua was the general manager of an electronics company. He was murdered following a failed attempt by one of his abductors to collect a ransom from his wife.	Murdered	4 days
1999	Bobbie Lynn Wofford	14	United States	The 14-year-old girl went missing on July 5, 1999, in Kingfisher, Oklahoma. On November 4, 1999, her body was found. Serial killer Tommy Lynn Sells confessed to the crime.	Murdered	4 months
1999	J.B. Beasley	17	United States	Beasley and Hawlett were high school students from Dothan, Alabama, who disappeared after leaving their homes to celebrate Beasley's 17th birthday on July 31, 1999. Their bodies were discovered in the trunk of Beasley's car in Ozark, Alabama, the following day. Both had been shot in the head, with at least one girl having also been raped. Their murders remained unsolved for over twenty years, although a suspect was arrested in 2019; he was convicted of both murders in April 2023 and sentenced to life imprisonment without the possibility of parole.	Murdered	1 day
1999	Tracie Hawlett	17	United States		Murdered	1 day
1999	Girly Chew Hossencofft	36	United States of America	Girly Chew Hossencofft, a Malaysian-born woman who disappeared on September 9, 1999, in Albuquerque, New Mexico. The investigation into the murder of Girly Chew revealed a conspiracy theory involving reptilian queens, UFOs and reports of cannibalism. Girly Chew's husband Diazien Hossencofft and his girlfriend Linda Henning were convicted of her murder. Girly's body has never been found.	Murdered	3 years
1999	Jorge Velosa	50	Colombia	Colombian singer-songwriter and veterinary physician credited for creating the carranga folk music genre. On September 25, 1999, he and his bandmates' transport car was intercepted by EPL guerillas, who kept Velosa hostage. Following numerous protests around the country, he was released without harm the following month.	Found alive	19 days
1999	Jaryd Atadero	3	United States of America	Jaryd Atadero was an American boy who went missing on October 2, 1999, in Colorado in the Arapaho & Roosevelt National Forest. On May 6, 2003, some of his remains were discovered by two businessmen while they were hiking. Though there are different theories to how he died, the true cause is not known.	Died (undetermined cause)	More than 3 years
1999	Dr Yves Godard	44	France	Yves Godard (44), was a French doctor who disappeared from a sailing boat with his two children in September 1999. In 2000, a skull fragment belonging to his daughter Camille was found while some bone fragments of Dr Godard were discovered six years later in the English Channel. No trace of his son or his wife (the latter did not go on the sailing trip and stayed at home) has ever been found, nor has any trace of the boat. However, investigators found traces of blood in the family home and in Godard's caravan, raising suspicion that Godard's wife was murdered. In 2012, the case was closed without charges. Prosecutors ruled out accidental death and believe that Dr Godard probably murdered his family before committing suicide at sea, but they also acknowledge that they are not certain of this.	Died (unknown cause)	1 year (Camille); 7 years (Yves); undiscovered (Marie-France & Marius)
1999	Marie-France Godard	43	France		Died (unknown cause)	1 year (Camille); 7 years (Yves); undiscovered (Marie-France & Marius)
1999	Camille Godard	6	France		Died (unknown cause)	1 year (Camille); 7 years (Yves); undiscovered (Marie-France & Marius)
1999	Marius Godard	4	France		Died (unknown cause)	1 year (Camille); 7 years (Yves); undiscovered (Marie-France & Marius)
1999	Rocío Wanninkhof	19	Spain	Spanish teenager who vanished while walking to a fair on October 9, 1999, with her nude body found three weeks later with nine stab wounds. Initially, her mother's girlfriend was wrongfully convicted for the murder, but was later exonerated after the DNA of convicted murderer Tony Alexander King was found on the body. King was convicted and sentenced to 19 years' imprisonment for the murder.	Murdered	3 weeks
1999	Jorge Matute Johns (es)	23	Chile	Jorge Matute, a Chilean forestry student who disappeared on November 20, 1999, in a discotheque near Concepción. In February 2004 human bones were found in the road to Santa Juana; forensic examinations verified that it was the remains of Matute.	Murdered	4 years
1999	Evelyn Wilkinson-Lund	52	France	English woman Evelyn Wilkinson-Lund disappeared on 29 December 1999 in Rayssac. Her body was found in her car on 13 October 2001. Her husband Robert Lund was convicted of her murder. In 2013 he was released from prison.	Murdered	2 years
1999	Lauria Bible	16	United States of America	Bible and Freeman were American teenagers who disappeared between the evening of December 29 and the early morning hours of December 30, 1999, from Freeman's home in Welch, Oklahoma. The Freeman home was burned and Freeman's parents were found murdered; however, law enforcement was unable to find any trace of Bible or Freeman in the rubble of the home. On April 26, 2018, it was reported that Ronnie Dean Busick was being charged with four counts of first-degree murder in the killings of Bible and of the Freeman family. In 2020, Busick was convicted and sentenced.	Murdered	Never found
1999	Ashley Freeman	16	United States of America		Murdered	Never found
1999	Xiana Fairchild	7	United States of America	Xiana Fairchild, American girl who was kidnapped in December 1999 from Vallejo, California and her skull was later found after she had been killed.	Murdered	1 year
