= Murder of Kori Lamaster =

American murder case

Kori Lamaster
- Born: Kori Joanne Lamaster; October 2, 1976; United States
- Status: Remains identified after 19 years
- Died: c. November 1993 (aged 17); Pogonip Park, Santa Cruz, California
- Cause of death: Homicide by bludgeoning
- Body discovered: January 29, 1994
- Other names: Pogonip Jane; Kori JoAnne Bowman

Kori JoAnne Lamaster was a formerly unidentified American murder victim who was found on January 29, 1994, after being killed in Pogonip Park, California, in 1993. She was reburied in an unmarked grave at nearby Soquel Cemetery. Lamaster's body remained unidentified for nineteen years until the comparison of familial DNA and a finger print card revealed her identity in 2013. Until then, she was referred to as Pogonip Jane by investigators and media.

== Physical characteristics and clothing ==
The decomposed remains of a white female were found in a shallow grave near a homeless campsite on January 19, 1994, in Pogonip Park in Santa Cruz, California. It was discovered by two hikers looking for mushrooms.

The victim was identified as being in her late teens with brown hair cut short and pink fingernails. The cause of death was ruled to be bludgeoning with a metal object most likely a pipe that had crushed her skull. Due to advanced decomposition, it was hard to ascertain her facial features. A tiny heart was discovered tattooed between her left thumb and index finger. Her teeth had a few cavities that had been filled in with porcelain. The isotope analysis of her hair revealed that she had traveled between Santa Barbara and Santa Cruz (she lived in Pacifica) prior to her death.

== Investigation ==
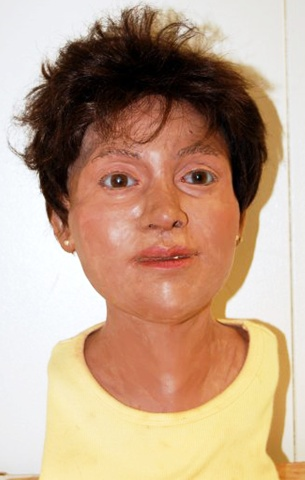
Clay reconstruction of the victim

The Santa Cruz Police Department got a fresh impetus to investigate the case when its original investigator Butch Baker was murdered in an unrelated crime. They decided to work towards solving the case in Baker's honor.

Strategies taken subsequently in an attempt to arrive at an identification included the creation of a clay model reconstruction based on the skull of the victim.

== Identification ==
Lamaster's family did not file a missing person report for her until 2007. The reason for the delay in filing a report was not revealed due to privacy reasons. A DNA sample from her biological mother was submitted and the State Department of Justice lab announced a familial match in October 2013 with DNA taken from the victim's body that had been entered into their system earlier.

Contact with Lamaster's sister in the state of Washington provided a fingerprint card taken when Lamaster was young which was then used to match prints taken during her autopsy. A father and son who had been seen traveling with Lamaster have been identified as persons of interest. The son has since died, while the father, Wayne White, resided in eastern Tennessee.

== See also ==
- List of solved missing person cases: 1990s
- List of unsolved murders (1980–1999)
