= Death of James Conklin =

Unsolved 1994 murder case in Utah

James Howard Conklin
- Born: 1950
- Disappeared: Estimated 1992 (aged 42); Kane County, Utah, U.S.
- Status: Partial remains found; case unsolved
- Height: 6'0 (estimated)

James Howard Conklin (b. 1950 - last seen May, 1988) was an American man whose body was found in 1994 in rural southern Utah. His body remained unidentified for thirty years until the Othram genetics lab identified the subject, whose last known whereabouts were in Arizona in 1988. He died of blunt-force trauma, but the circumstances of his death and his reasons for being in Utah are uncertain.

== Discovery ==
On February 6, 1994, hikers discovered a human skull about a quarter mile south of State Road 89 near the town of Big Water, in Kane County, Utah. The skull had been wedged into a rock crevice in an isolated rural region. A subsequent search of the surrounding area revealed additional skeletal remains scattered by scavenging animals, along with several personal items. Investigators initially estimated the man died around 1985, but later revised this date to 1992, two years before the discovery of his remains.

The skull exhibited signs of blunt force trauma, suggesting the victim was killed by a blow or stomp to the head. University of Utah anthropologist John McCullough demonstrated that the right side of the man’s face had been knocked loose from the skull as a result of the impact. Blood-soaked sand was found where the body had been dumped, further suggesting the individual may have died at that location. It was further speculated that the man's body had been dumped under a juniper tree before his remains were scattered by coyotes.

== Physical description ==
The unidentified man was estimated to be between 30 and 55 years old at the time of his death. He was approximately 6 feet tall, with brown hair that had a touch of grey. McCullough also noted that the man had large bones and rugged facial features. Investigators believed his ethnic background was primarily white with possible Native American ancestry. The man had extensive dental work, including a porcelain crown and a gold filling. Forensic artists later produced a facial reconstruction based on the remains to assist with identification efforts.

== Clothing and personal items ==
Several personal items were discovered near the remains, including a red baseball cap, a plaid jacket with a blue quilted liner (size XL), a red, white, and black plaid flannel shirt, blue denim trousers (size 33), and Pro Action tennis shoes (size 11 1/2). A pair of shattered sunglasses was found nearby, along with three faded documents. These documents included a jail booking sheet and a court document from Coconino County, Arizona, as well as a newspaper clipping listing entertainment events in Flagstaff, Arizona. Some articles of clothing were found to have been torn, possibly indicating a struggle or movement through rough terrain.

== Investigation ==
Investigators speculated that the man may have traveled from Flagstaff, Arizona, and was either killed along the way or after arriving in Kane County. Kane County Sheriff Maxwell Jackson hoped that sending the faded documents to FBI forensic experts in Washington, D.C., could yield clues to the man’s identity. Blood-soaked sand found at the scene was also sent to Oregon in an attempt to extract DNA. However, the documents were too faded to provide concrete leads, and efforts to identify the man through forensic reconstruction and DNA testing were initially unsuccessful. The exact cause of death remains undetermined, though blunt force trauma is suspected. As of now, the case remains unsolved.

== Identification ==
In 2024, 30 years after the case had gone cold, the Othram genetics lab in Texas was able to piece together a "comprehensive DNA profile" of the John Doe, despite the failure of earlier attempts to identify the body by DNA analysis. Orthram was able to provide a list of possible relatives to Kane County Sheriff's Detectives, who were able to contact one possible relative for a DNA sample. This DNA testing confirmed the John Doe was the relative's father, James Howard Conklin, a homeless man last seen in Flagstaff, Arizona, in May of 1988. The exact manner of Conklin's death is still under investigation.

== See also ==
- List of solved missing person cases: 1990s
- List of unsolved murders (1980–1999)
