= Murder of Jennifer Odom =

Solved cold case and 1993 murder of a 12-year-old girl in Dade City, Florida

Jennifer Odom
- Odom's in 1993
- Born: Jennifer Renee Odom; August 25, 1980; Florida, U.S.
- Died: February 19, 1993 (aged 12); Dade City, Florida, U.S.
- Cause of death: Blunt force trauma
- Resting place: Sacred Heart Cemetery
- Education: Thomas E. Weightman Middle School
- Occupation: Middle school student
- Known for: Abduction and murder victim

On February 19, 1993, 12-year-old Jennifer Renee Odom (August 25, 1980 – February 19, 1993) was last seen getting off her school bus near her home in Dade City, Florida, before she was kidnapped by an unknown person. Odom remained missing for six days until her body was found in an orange grove on February 25, 1993. Investigations showed that Odom had been raped and beaten before she died.

The case remained unsolved for 30 years until Jeffrey Norman Crum (born August 18, 1961; also spelled Jeffery Crum), who was serving life in prison for an unrelated kidnapping crime, was identified as the perpetrator through DNA testing. Crum was convicted of first-degree murder in August 2026, and the prosecution is seeking the death penalty.

== Disappearance and death ==
On February 19, 1993, 12-year-old Jennifer Renee Odom was last seen getting off her school bus in Dade City, Pasco County, Florida; her drop-off point was about 200 yards from her home. According to several students who shared the same school bus as Odom, they witnessed a full-size faded blue pickup truck trailing after Odom as she walked back home from the area where she alighted from the bus.

Odom's younger sister found the house locked and empty, and alerted their mother about Odom's disappearance. Odom's mother returned home and searched through nearby orange groves and fields for her elder daughter, who was subsequently reported missing. From February 20 to 25, 1993, police officers and police dogs from the Tampa Bay region were deployed to conduct a massive-scale search for the missing girl. Hundreds of volunteers were also participating in the search, which stretched across 60 square miles of rolling groves, pastures and woods.

On February 25, 1993, six days after Odom's disappearance, a man and a woman found Odom's body inside an orange grove in neighboring Hernando County, Florida. At the time she was found, Odom's body was nearly nude and only had a single sock on her right foot, and there was bruising on both her hands and arms, and some dirt was kicked up by her feet beneath where she was found, suggesting that Odom tried hard to resist an attack. An autopsy confirmed that the cause of death was blunt force trauma to the head, and Odom's body showed signs of being brutally attacked, raped and beaten before her death.

At the time of the body's discovery, Odom's clothes, including a red sweater and Hooters jacket, were missing, and despite a search, they were never found. Two years after her death, on January 5, 1995, a couple discovered Odom's missing book bag and clarinet case while they were collecting scrap metal in Hernando County.

== Investigations ==
After the discovery of Odom's murder, the police conducted extensive investigations into the crime, but the case went cold until the 2023 identification and arrest of one suspect behind the murder.

Among all the leads investigated by the police, they gained a description of the blue truck, which was seen trailing after the victim before she went missing. The police believed that the driver of the truck was the most likely suspect responsible for the killing, which they speculated to have been the product of a kidnapping attempt. The driver was described to be a white man with shoulder-length brown hair and was thought to be in his 40s. When Odom's bag and clarinet case were found two years after her death, the police extracted fingerprints from these items but they were unable to match them to the ones stored in their database.

On December 2, 1994, American documentary series Unsolved Mysteries re-enacted Odom's murder and aired it on television.

In the early stages of investigation, the police investigated suspected serial killer Frank Thaniel Potts as a possible culprit behind the Odom case. Potts, who was a suspect in at least 15 murders in six states, was reported to have owned a blue truck, which matched the description of the suspect's truck. However, Potts was ultimately not charged for the killing of Odom. Potts was eventually convicted of one murder from Alabama and sentenced to life imprisonment, and he died in prison in 2023 while serving a separate life term in Florida for a sexual battery case.

Potts was not the only suspect investigated for the crime. The police received a report from a woman who at first claimed she was the killer in Odom's case, before she implicated her ex-husband Walter Ducharme. In July 1998, five years after Odom's murder, police detectives from Florida traveled to Maine, where they tracked down Ducharme and probed him in relation to the murder. On November 19, 1998, the jury reviewed the case and decided to not indict Ducharme for the charge of murdering Odom, stating that there were inconsistencies and inaccuracies in the allegations against Ducharme, who was released from prison.

In 2002, when serial killer Richard Evonitz died by suicide during a standoff with police while facing arrest for an abduction-rape case, the Florida authorities investigated his case to determine whether he was possibly involved in several unsolved murder cases, and Evonitz was named a possible suspect behind Odom's murder. However, police later determined that Evonitz was in prison in February 1993, thus ruling him out as a suspect, although he was posthumously linked to at least three murders.

In 2004, when Joseph P. Smith was arrested for the rape and murder of Carlie Brucia, the Florida authorities investigated several unsolved murder cases to confirm whether Smith was involved in these homicides, one of which included Jennifer Odom. Smith never faced any charges for the murder of Odom, but he was tried and sentenced to death for the murder of Brucia, and he eventually died of liver cancer while on death row in 2021.

In February 2013, 20 years after the killing of Odom, the Hernando County Sheriff's Office assigned a detective to investigate the case for a year, and Odom's grandmother expressed her hope that the authorities could capture her grand daughter's killer.

In June 2018, Hernando County Detective George Loydgren, head of the cold case investigation unit, stated that with the advanced technology and improved techniques in DNA testing, there was increased hope that the murder of Odom would be solved.

In February 2019, the Hernando County Sheriff's Office, which still investigated the case, stated that the cold case murder of Odom still "weighs heavy on the hearts and minds of Hernando and Pasco County investigators", and urged potential witnesses to come forward to provide assistance the investigation.

In February 2022, the Hernando County Sheriff's Office made a public appeal for information or clues to solve the murder. On February 19, 2023, the 30th anniversary of Odom's death, her mother appealed to the public for potential witnesses to come forward with new information to crack the case.

== Arrest and charges ==
=== Identification of suspect ===
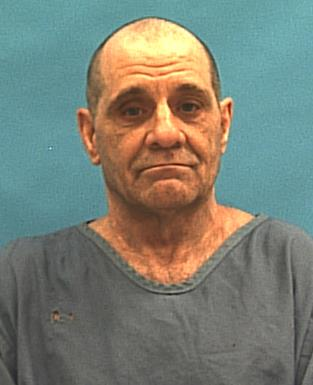
Jeffery Norman Crum, Suspect

On July 27, 2023, 30 years after the murder of Jennifer Odom, Hernando County Sheriff Al Nienhuis announced at a press conference that investigators had identified and arrested a convicted prisoner serving a life sentence for rape in connection with the Jennifer Odom case, after DNA tests linked the suspect to the crime.

The suspect was identified as 61-year-old Jeffrey Norman Crum, who was serving two life sentences for a previously unsolved kidnapping and rape case that had occurred 13 months before Odom's death. The incident occurred on January 16, 1992, when Crum abducted a teenage girl shortly after she got off a bus. She was raped and beaten and left for dead by Crum, but she survived the incident. The case, like Odom's, remained unsolved for more than two decades. The investigation was reopened in 2015 after Crum’s son, Jeffrey Crum Jr., provided a DNA sample while he was serving a 30-year sentence for armed robbery since 2012. The sample matched evidence from the January 1992 crime scene. As Jeffrey Jr. had been a child at the time, investigators used familial DNA testing to trace the profile through his family, eventually identifying Crum as the suspect.

Crum was subsequently arrested and charged with kidnapping, attempted murder and sexual assault, and sentenced to life in prison in 2019. He was also considered a person of interest in Odom’s murder because of the similarities between the two cases and the proximity of the 1993 crime scene to the location where Odom was killed. State records showed that Crum was previously convicted in 1987 for kidnapping and sex offences, as well as convictions for robbery and sexual battery in 1981 and 1985 respectively.

Ultimately, DNA test results matched Crum's DNA profile and fingerprints to those of the suspect in the Odom case. Furthermore, based on investigations, the suspect was found to have worked in drywall and also resided in Pasco County at the time of Odom's kidnapping and killing, and he also owned a blue truck.

=== Charges and pre-trial developments ===
On July 27, 2023, the same date of the announcement of his arrest, Crum was charged with first-degree murder, kidnapping and sexual battery, after a grand jury indicted him for these above charges. Florida Fifth Circuit State Attorney Bill Gladson announced that his office would seek the death penalty against the suspect on the first-degree murder charge.

On February 27, 2026, Crum was scheduled to stand trial tentatively in August 2026 for the charge of raping and murdering Odom.

On June 8, 2026, a Hernando County judge granted the prosecution's motion to introduce evidence of the January 1992 rape case into Crum's upcoming murder trial, which was set to begin on August 17, 2026.

== Trial of Jeffrey Crum ==
=== Hearing and conviction ===
On August 17, 2026, Jeffrey Crum officially stood trial for the murder of Jennifer Odom. A 12-member jury was selected on the same day to hear the case.

On August 18, 2026, the jury trial of Crum officially commenced at the Hernando County Circuit Court, and the prosecution made their opening statements on that day.

On the second day of the trial, Crum's son Jeffrey Jr., who was still incarcerated for robbery, was summoned as a witness, and he testifed that about 20 years ago, during a drinking session between father and son, Crum admitted to his son that he had raped a young black girl (the January 1992 victim) and also murdered another young girl (Odom). Jeffrey Jr. also recounted that when he was 12, his father gave him a clarinet as a gift, but he only played it once before losing interest and putting it aside, and it later disappeared. When the prosecutor showed him Odom's black clarinet case and the instrument, Jeffrey Jr. identified it as the same clarinet and case he received from his father. Apart from Crum's son, several other witnesses, including Crum's former girlfriend and two prisoners who were detained in the same prison as Crum, testified that Crum had admitted to them about raping one girl and killing another.

The state rested its case on August 19, 2026, and the defence likewise rested its case on the same day without summoning any witnesses, and closing submissions were scheduled for the following morning of August 20, 2026.

On August 20, 2026, during the closing submissions phase, the prosecution urged the jury to convict Crum of murder, citing that the defendant was connected to the case through the evidence, including testimonies from his own son and three other people who heard him confess to the crime, the uncanny similarities between the Odom case and the January 1992 rape case, both of which were linked to Crum via DNA testing, and the witness description of the truck that fitted Crum's truck which he owned at the time of the killing. The prosecution further alluded to the brutal nature of Odom's death and severity of her injuries in their submissions. On the other hand, the defence argued that there was no physical evidence linking Crum to the crime and attempted to impeach the credibility of the witnesses who heard Crum's confessions by pointing out their backgrounds (most of whom were convicted felons). The defence also stated that the similarities between Odom's murder and the January 1992 rape case should not be used as proof that Crum was the same perpetrator in both cases.

On the same day, Crum was found guilty of first-degree murder, kidnapping and sexual battery by the jury, after they spent more than five hours to deliberate the case. A sentencing trial was scheduled four days later on August 24, 2026.

=== Penalty phase ===
On August 24, 2026, Crum's sentencing phase began before the same 12-member jury, who were tasked with deciding between life without parole or the death penalty for Crum. Under Florida state law, Crum faces a potential death sentence if at least eight jurors voted to sentence him to death.

On August 25, 2026, on what would have been Odom's 46th birthday, the jury unanimously voted to sentence Crum to death after deliberating for just over two hours.

== See also ==
- List of kidnappings (1990–1999)
- List of solved missing person cases (1990s)
