= Murder of Arlene Arkinson =

1994 missing child case in Northern Ireland

Arlene Arkinson
- Born: Arlene Bernadette Arkinson; 20 April 1979; Castlederg, County Tyrone, Northern Ireland
- Disappeared: 14 August 1994 (aged 15); Castlederg, County Tyrone, Northern Ireland
- Status: Missing for 32 years, 1 month and 17 days

Locations
1 Bundoran
2 Castlederg

Arlene Arkinson was a 15-year-old Northern Irish teenager who disappeared on 14 August 1994. Her body has never been found. Robert Howard, a convicted murderer and sex offender, was found not guilty of her murder in 2005. However a 2021 inquest found him responsible for her murder.

== Background ==
Arlene Arkinson was a 15-year-old girl from Castlederg, County Tyrone. The final years of her life were described by the media as ‘troubled’ with her mother dying when she was just 11 and her father suffering from alcoholism. Following her mother's death, Arkinson lived with a number of her older siblings and experienced sexual abuse at the hands of her brother-in-law, Seamus McGale. McGale was convicted for the crime. He was released from prison 10 days prior to Arkinson's disappearance.

Arkinson had gone missing before her final disappearance, but these incidents were resolved within 48 hours.

== Disappearance ==
On 13 August 1994, Arlene Arkinson attended a disco in Bundoran, County Donegal in the Republic of Ireland. She attended the disco with her friend Donna Quinn, Donna's partner Sean Heggarty, and Robert Howard who was the partner of Quinn's mother Patricia Quinn.

Arkinson was last seen sitting in Howard's car in Castlederg in the early hours of 14 August 1994.

== Investigation ==
At the outset of the investigation, Patricia Quinn provided an alibi for Howard, claiming that he returned to her home with Heggarty and Donna Quinn at 3 am on the morning of 14 August after already having dropped Arkinson off at a pub. Heggarty later came forward to the police and admitted that Patricia Quinn had asked him to lie to the police. He told police that Howard had dropped him and Donna Quinn off at the Quinn home and then drove off with Arlene.

Robert Howard was on bail at the time of Arlene's disappearance. Priscilla Gahan, a 16-year-old lodger who lived with Patricia Quinn, accused Howard of holding her captive, placing a noose around her neck, and raping her over a period of three days. Gahan escaped from a second-story window and sought police help. Howard was later found guilty of unlawful carnal knowledge despite having been initially charged with multiple rapes and with buggery. Priscilla attended court to give evidence only to find a behind the scenes a deal was struck to drop the more serious charges. Robert Howard received a suspended sentence and was immediately back on the streets, where he was an informant for the RUC.

Despite having been the last person to see Arkinson and being on bail for a sex offence, it took 46 days for Howard to be arrested and questioned. This decision was later criticised by later investigators. Howard was released without charge but the local IRA forced him to l move to Scotland where the British state rewarded him for his service with a council house, but his past was leaked to a newspaper who reported on his past. This was likely to be the work of the IRA.

Police heard from friends of Arkinson's that she had confided her fears that she was pregnant by someone who was close to the family. As Arkinson's body has never been recovered, this cannot be proven.

In an attempt to distract from their own criminality Robert Howard, the RUC excavated the garden at the home of Arkinson's sister, Kathleen Arkinson, in a search for remains. Police used a sledgehammer to gain access to the house as they were initially denied entry by the residence. No remains were found. The Arkinson family later sued in relation to this incident.

In March 2002, Howard was charged with the murder of Arlene Arkinson. Before this case could be taken to court, he first had to be tried for the murder of Hannah Williams in London.

Extensive searches for Arkinson have taken place, as recently as 2024, however no remains have been recovered.

== Murder of Hannah Williams ==
Prior to the trial for Arkinson's murder, Howard was tried and convicted of the murder of Hannah Williams in London. William's body was recovered from a disused cement works on March 15, 2002. Reporting restrictions were in place during the trial as Howard has charges pending in Northern Ireland.

Hannah Williams was a 14-year-old girl from Dartford, Kent who disappeared on April 21, 2001. She came from a working-class family and had experienced sexual abuse as a child.

Howard had been in a romantic relationship with Mary Scollan, the former partner of Williams’ father. Howard used Scollan's phone to lure Williams to him.

Howard was found guilty of the murder of Williams and sentenced to life in prison.

== Trial ==
Howard went on trial for the murder of Arlene Arkinson in 2005 in Belfast Crown Court. The jury did not hear evidence of other crimes Howard was convicted of and the defence solicitor argued that it could not be proven Arkinson was dead and suggested alternative explanations such as running away or committing suicide. Howard was acquitted of the murder by a majority verdict of 10 - 2.

Robert Howard died in prison in 2015 while serving a life sentence for the rape and murder of Hannah Williams.

== Inquest ==
An inquest into the death of Arlene Atkinson opened in February 2021 following years of delay and lasted until July 2021. The inquest found that Robert Howard has murdered Arlene Arkinson and the coroner dismissed claims that Arlene had left voluntarily or died by suicide.

During the inquest, allegations were made that Howard was a state agent. This claim was later repeated by Kent Police Detective Chief Inspector Colin Murray who led the investigation into the murder of Hannah Williams.

Following the inquest, the Police Ombudsman's Office found that the police failed to adequately investigate the disappearance of Arlene Arkinson and did not properly investigate reports that she was last sighted with a known sex offender. They also reported that they had grounds to arrest Howard within 48 hours, but instead waited 46 days to do so.

== Media ==
Arlene Arkinson's disappearance and murder have been heavily covered in the media, often alongside that of Hannah Williams. It was featured in the BBC documentary series Murder in the Badlands, in the TG4 documentary series Marú inár Measc and in the true crime novel Unsolved by Barry Cummins.

== See also ==
- List of solved missing person cases: 1990s
