= Joseph Doucé =

Belgian-born French murder victim

- Born: 13 April 1945; Sint-Truiden, Belgium
- Died: c. July 1990 (aged 45); Paris, France
- Cause of death: Homicide
- Occupation: Psychologist
- Known for: Victim of unsolved murder

Joseph Doucé (13 April 1945 – c. July 1990) was born to a rural family in Sint-Truiden, Belgium. He was a psychologist and a (defrocked) Baptist pastor in Paris.

He was openly gay and was among the founders of the International Lesbian and Gay Association. He served as a volunteer soldier in the NATO base at Limoges, France, where he had time to perfect his French. After one year of pastoral and humanistic studies at Stenonius College (also known as Europaseminär, a Roman Catholic seminary today extinct) in Maastricht, the Netherlands, he began his conversion to Protestantism around 1966.

His Centre du Christ Libérateur (CCL) was a ministry to sexual minorities. The centre had support groups for homosexuals, transsexuals, sadomasochists and pedophiles.

== Death ==
Doucé was killed and the murder has never been solved. According to Doucé's lover, he was taken away by two men, who showed police badges on 19 July 1990. The body was found in a forest in October 1990.

== See also ==
- List of solved missing person cases (1990s)
- List of unsolved murders (1980–1999)
