= Murder of Gail Shollar =

1992 murder in New Jersey, United States

Gail Shollar
- Born: April 13, 1957
- Died: November 3, 1992 (aged 35)
- Cause of death: Stabbing
- Body discovered: November 7, 1992; Piscataway, New Jersey, U.S.
- Spouse: Robert Shollar (1957–2023)
- Children: Sherri Shollar; Bobby Shollar; Andrea Shollar

Gail F. Shollar (1957–1992) was a 35-year-old Piscataway, NJ mother who was raped and murdered after being carjacked from the Middlesex Shopping Mall in South Plainfield, NJ. She was one of the first people in New Jersey to be reported as a victim of carjacking, although the act of carjacking significantly predated the term itself.

== The crime ==
On the evening of November 3, 1992, Gail Shollar, a mother of three children, was shopping at a mall in South Plainfield with her 3-year-old daughter, Andrea. Twenty-three-year-old Scott Johnson was then reported to have approached Gail from behind with a folding knife, grabbed her by the hair and pressed the knife to her neck. He then forced her to drive around for two hours. Johnson then dropped Andrea Shollar off on the lawn of The First Class Child Care Center in Piscataway, NJ. The next morning she was found crying by two workers, cold and wet from the rain. At 6:20 AM on November 4, 1992, the Piscataway police received a call from Michelle Carnavale, a teacher's assistant at the daycare, who stated how she found Andrea and that Andrea was refusing to answer questions. Four days later, Gail's partially nude body was found under leaves in a drainage ditch at the Stelton Lumber Company Yard; she had been raped and murdered with more than 40 stab wounds. As a result of the case, carjacking became a household word and new laws were drafted to deal severely with this type of crime.

== Investigation and apprehension of suspect ==
One day after the abduction, the Shollar minivan was found a few miles from the shopping mall, and the police recovered a palm print, fingerprints and other forensic evidence that was matched to Scott R. Johnson of Plainfield, NJ. The next day a kitchen knife with Mrs. Shollar's blood on it was found in the back yard of Johnson's girlfriend's home. Andrea Shollar described the suspect as a black man wearing black pants and a black shirt. The Piscataway police also obtained a composite sketch from a woman who had reported a suspicious van in the neighborhood after observing a man standing on her front porch. The van was found to belong to Mrs. Shollar and her driver's license and other items were found inside it. This same woman later picked out the picture of Scott Johnson in a photo array.

During other interviews, it was determined that Johnson had previously lived nearby in Piscataway before moving to Plainfield. On Friday, November 6, 1992, Piscataway police questioned Johnson outside his residence and observed a large bandage over a cut on his right hand, which he explained as having happened while he was washing dishes. After learning that the palm print and fingerprints found in the minivan matched Johnson, the Piscataway police arrested him on November 8, 1992.

== Trial, conviction and appeal ==
Johnson was tried on 13 counts for the carjacking, rape and murder of Gail Shollar. The trial began on January 24, 1995, in New Brunswick, NJ. On February 24, the jury found him guilty on all counts. During the penalty phase of the trial, the jury was unable to reach a unanimous decision on death by lethal injection, and on May 8, Johnson was sentenced to life imprisonment with 30-year parole ineligibility for the murder and a consecutive 100-year sentence with 50-year parole ineligibility for the other crimes. Johnson appealed, and on March 9, 1998, the appeals court affirmed both the convictions and the sentences.

== See also ==
- List of kidnappings
- List of solved missing person cases
