= Camille Cléroux =

Canadian serial killer (1954–2021)

- Born: 1954; Ottawa, Ontario, Canada
- Died: January 17, 2021 (aged 67); Abbotsford, British Columbia, Canada
- Conviction: Murder ×3
- Penalty: Life imprisonment

Details
- Victims: 3
- Span of crimes: 1990–2010
- Country: Canada
- State: Ontario
- Date apprehended: June 2, 2010

Camille Joseph Cléroux (1954 – January 17, 2021) was a Canadian serial killer who murdered two of his wives and a neighbour between 1990 and 2010 in Ottawa, Ontario. After his arrest for killing his neighbour, the disappearances of his former wives were investigated, with him eventually admitting to killing both. Cléroux was sentenced to life imprisonment.

== Murders ==
=== Lise Roy ===
Cléroux married Lise Roy, a divorcée with a young daughter, on July 4, 1987, and the pair would have a son later on. Their marriage was reportedly happy, but in April 1990, Roy found out that Cléroux had been molesting her daughter. The two engaged in a heated argument in the backyard of their home in Heron Gate, during which Cléroux picked up a rock and struck Roy in the head, killing her. He dismembered her body, wrapped up the remains in butcher paper and put them in garbage bags which he hauled to nearby Heatherington Park. Cléroux buried some of the remains in the park and brought the rest back to the house, burying them in the backyard. The day after Roy's murder, neighbours noticed that Cléroux had a brand-new vegetable garden in his backyard, unaware that he had built it on top of Roy's buried remains. In order to make himself an alibi, Cléroux went to the police and claimed that Roy had assaulted him and fled on a bus to Montreal. The police issued an arrest warrant for Roy, after which Cléroux made occasional claims that he had seen her. Cléroux would later serve prison time for sexually assaulting a child.

=== Jean Rock ===
Jean Rock met Cléroux in June 1992 while he was working as a dishwasher at an Ottawa diner. The couple's common-law marriage was unstable, with the two separating several times because of Cléroux's physically and emotionally abusive behaviour. One day in the fall of 2003, Cléroux took Rock out on a walk through a wooded area near Walkley Rail Yard, where he beat her to death with a rock and buried her in a shallow grave. In an attempt to cover up Rock's murder, Cléroux paid a female acquaintance to write letters in Rock's name to her family. In the letters, sent 2-3 times a year between 2004 and 2010, the forger claimed that Rock had left Cléroux and was now living with a truck driver named Pierre. Later letters claimed that she had given birth to several sons and daughters and even included photos of the purported children. Because of this deceit, she was never declared missing.

In 2004, the area where Rock's remains were buried was being developed into housing. Fearing the grave could be discovered, Cléroux dug up Rock's remains and moved them to a new grave on the other side of the rail yard. In 2006, when he noticed that animals had been disturbing the grave, Cléroux collected Rock's remains in a produce bag and used a shopping cart to transport them all the way to the Bronson Bridge spanning the Rideau Canal. After weighting the bag with some stones, he threw it into the water. The remains were discovered in October of that year when the canal was drained, but they could not be identified.

=== Paula Leclair ===
By 2010, Cléroux had moved to a nearby high-rise building where he was neighbours with Paula Leclair. Cléroux was jealous that Leclair's apartment was more spacious and had a better view. He asked Leclair to give him the apartment, but she refused. On May 20, he asked Leclair to accompany him on a walk near Fairlea Park. Upon entering the woods, Cléroux forced her to a shallow grave with a knife he had stolen from the diner where he worked. When they reached the grave, he stabbed Leclair in the back and hit her in the head with a rock. After burying the body and taking her keys, Cléroux returned to the apartment where he started gathering Leclair's belongings and throwing them into a dumpster. When questioned about her whereabouts, he claimed that Leclair had recently won the lottery and was on vacation at Walt Disney World in Florida and, upon returning to Canada, she would move in with her son at his new apartment in Gatineau.

== Arrest and investigation ==
On May 29, Leclair's son, André, visited her apartment to check on her, as he had not heard from her in several days. He opened the door using a spare key and was shocked to find that the space was filled with another person's belongings. At that moment, Cléroux walked out from an elevator, coolly explaining to André that Leclair had given him the apartment, after which he asked André to give him the spare key. Unconvinced by his explanation, André went to the police and informed them of the suspicious transaction. While the authorities were investigating, Cléroux instructed his forger to write a letter claiming to be Leclair, explaining that she had given the apartment to her neighbour willingly and to stop pestering him. In an attempt to convince them of the ownership, Cléroux met with Detective John Monette of the Ottawa Police Service to explain the situation. At the end of their two-hour interview, however, he admitted to killing Leclair. Cléroux was charged with first-degree murder on June 3. In an interview with the Ottawa Citizen at the Ottawa-Carleton Detention Centre, Cléroux appeared emotionless as he described how he planned and executed Leclaire's murder stating "I just lost it. I burned a fuse, that's all."

While investigating his past, authorities discovered that both of his previous wives had vanished in a suspicious manner. Several of Cléroux's former neighbours came forward with information about his suspicious behaviour over the years, with many describing him as a loner who was aggressive with women. On the day of Roy's murder, screams could be heard coming from his home. One neighbour said that they saw Cléroux dragging garbage bags to Heatherington Park that same day, but thought nothing of it because Cléroux had a reputation for being somewhat eccentric. Another neighbour said that he found a large bone in Cléroux's backyard while helping him with renovations. When pressed on the issue, Cléroux admitted that he had killed both of them as well but refused to give up the locations of their remains. He was charged with two additional counts of first-degree murder on June 25.

On October 31, 2011, city workers discovered human remains in the backyard of Cléroux's former home. This lead them to the second burial site at Heatherington Park. In April 2012, police discovered more remains in the woods between Fairlea Park and Walkley Yard.

== Trial and imprisonment ==
Cléroux's hearing began on March 20, 2012. He reportedly sat expressionless while the details of his crimes were described in court. While the Crown attorney was describing Cléroux's letter-forging scheme, Rock's father, John, collapsed and had to be escorted out of the courtroom, muttering under his breath "He's an animal" and "I'll kill him". On June 26, 2012, Cléroux pleaded guilty to all three murders, and was sentenced to life imprisonment, with a chance of parole after 25 years. During sentencing, Justice Lynn Ratushny said "With a mind that has functioned in a way that yours has and does, there's no better place for you than in custody. After hearing the stomach-churning details today, and your plan to kill these cherished women just to get them out of your way, we can all take some comfort knowing that you are incarcerated and likely will be for the rest of your life."

On January 17, 2021, Cléroux died from apparent natural causes at the Pacific Institution & Regional Reception Centre in Abbotsford, British Columbia, aged 67.

== See also ==
- List of serial killers by country
