= Killing of Randi Boothe-Wilson =

American murder victim

Randi Boothe-Wilson
- Born: July 10, 1961, New York, U.S.
- Disappeared: October 28, 1994; White Plains, New York, U.S.
- Status: Identified after 23 years
- Died: 1994 - 1995 (aged 33 - 34)
- Cause of death: Undetermined, manner considered as homicide
- Body discovered: December 6, 1995
- Other names: Jacksonville Jane Doe, Jane Doe 95-7000
- Height: 5 ft 5 in (1.65 m)

Randi Stacey Boothe-Wilson (known primarily by her middle name) was a formerly unidentified American woman discovered dead in Jacksonville, Onslow County, North Carolina on December 6, 1995.

Boothe-Wilson served as a member of the United States Marine Corps from the early 1980s to her discharge in August 1994. She had married a fellow Marine, but they were divorced in 1994. Following her discharge, Boothe-Wilson found work as a security guard at a museum. In late October 1994, Boothe-Wilson left her children to go visit her sister in Queens, New York, but never arrived. Her vehicle was found abandoned. Her body was later found in a field in Jacksonville, North Carolina.

== Life and disappearance ==
Boothe-Wilson was a United States Marine who married fellow Marine Earle Wilson in 1981. The couple had two sons, Earle III in 1984 and Elliot in 1987, and one daughter, Leslye. Earle and Boothe-Wilson's marriage began to worsen in 1994, and they divorced after a discharge from the Marine Corps in August 1994. Earle also usually made late child support payments. Boothe-Wilson left and traveled across the country with her children to her native New York. The family moved into an apartment and moved to different locations, such as Boothe-Wilson's mother's home. Boothe-Wilson was working as a security guard for a Manhattan museum at the time.

On October 28, 1994, Boothe-Wilson left her children to go visit her sister in Queens, New York, but never arrived. Later, Boothe-Wilson's vehicle was found abandoned at a disputed location.

Letters to her children were discovered that indicated she planned to leave them. Her credit cards were later mailed to her husband. Forensic analysis of the letters addressed to her children was inconclusive with determining who had written them, although Boothe-Wilson's handwriting was similar.

== Discovery ==
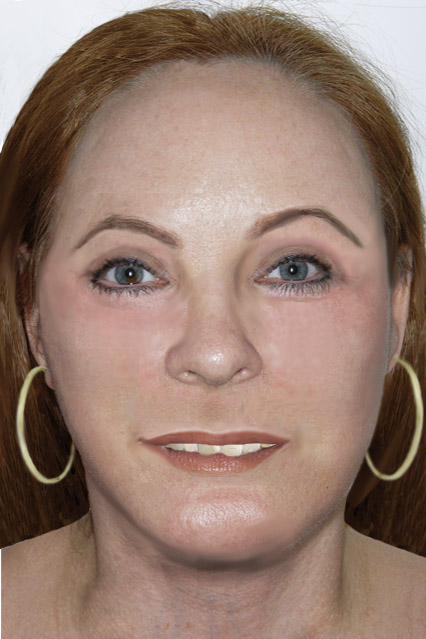
Facial reconstruction of the victim, who was inaccurately classified as Caucasian

The body was found in a field in Jacksonville, North Carolina. The remains were believed to have been disposed around two years before. She stood at approximately between 5 ft 5 in (1.65 m) and 5 ft 8 in (1.73 m) tall and her weight could not be estimated due to the condition of her body. The victim's age was estimated to have been between the early and late 30s, although The Doe Network reported that the range cloud have been as large as 25 to 40. She was inaccurately believed to be Caucasian.

Near the skeleton was a strand of reddish hair that may have belonged to her. She had various evidence of dental work on her teeth, although some had protruded from her mouth. Examination of her body also indicated she had a divided rib. Items such as a Nike shoe, gold jewelry, hoop earrings, red, black and yellow clothing, a hotel key, and subway tokens from New York were also present at the scene. No evidence of foul play was found on her bones, although it is believed that she was murdered.

== Investigation ==
The case remains unsolved, although in 2012 police had a suspect in Matthew Lorne Alder, who had a possible connection with her death. He was imprisoned in 1995 for the rape and murder of Lisa Gipson. In 2013, he pleaded guilty to the murder of Wanda Musk. He currently is serving a life sentence for his crimes. The Jane Doe's case was featured on the website for America's Most Wanted but did not lead to her identification.

Her face was reconstructed, in 2D as well as 3D, as an attempt to show what she may have looked like when she was alive. Bone marrow was used as a source to develop a DNA Profile.

It was announced in February 2019 that the remains were identified as Boothe-Wilson after DNA was matched between the unidentified remains and her DNA profile in January. The match was made after DNA from an envelope sent by Boothe-Wilson was extracted from a stamp. Dental records were also compared.

== See also ==
- List of solved missing person cases: 1950–1999
- List of unsolved deaths
