= Elvino Gargiulo =

Italian serial killer (1925–2005)

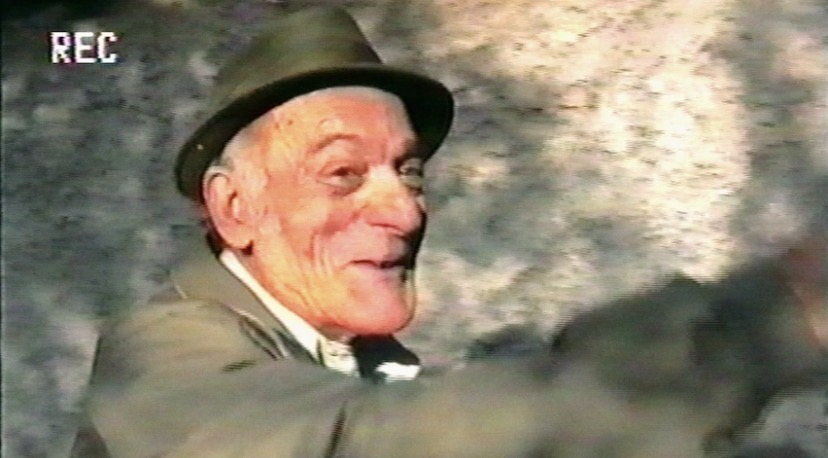
- Born: 1925; Meta, Campania
- Died: 2005 (aged 80); Rome
- Other name: “The Monster of Quadraro”
- Criminal charges: Murder, pedophilia, theft, injuries, incest, polygamy, kidnapping, sexual violence, vilification and concealment of a corpse, complicity
- Penalty: 46 years of imprisonment

Details
- Victims: 3
- Date: September 1991 - 13 November 1994
- Span of crimes: 1991–1994
- Imprisoned at: 12 December 1995 - 2005

Elvino Gargiulo, known as the "Monster of Quadraro", (1925–2005), was an Italian serial killer, responsible for a double homicide in the Roman suburb of Quadraro in 1991. He was sentenced alongside his son Mario Gargiulo who was also his biological grandson. He was also found guilty of he kidnapping and murder of a 14-year-old boy in 1994, as well as having committed acts of violent lust on him.

== Biography ==
Born in the province of Naples in 1925, Gargiulo began to commit serious sexual violence against several women in the area from an early age. He married three times, and from one of these marriages he had two children whom he sexually abused several times making his daughter pregnant. In 1968 his son Mario was born, who had a childhood devastated by the abuse and violence of his father Elvino who sold him in exchange for valuable objects and forced him to eat mice. Mario, who lost his mother at the age of eight, grew up as a person suffering from serious mental disorders. In 1986 Gargiulo moved to Rome, where he started a second-hand business in Via Demetriade.

=== The disappearance of Luca Amorese ===
On the afternoon of 13 November 1994, in Quadraro, 14-year-old Roman Luca Amorese, a boy of Cape Verdean origins left home on his scooter and never returned. The next day, his mother Rosa reported her son missing to the police and the search involved the entire neighborhood. Even AS Tuscolano, the team where Amorese played football, mobilized to find the boy. Luca's father, Vincenzo Amorese, gave an interview to the television programme Chi l'ha visto? where he talked about his son's disappearance and the case soon became national. According to the testimonies of his family and teammates, in the months before his disappearance Luca had stopped going to school and training. Furthermore, he had started wearing expensive clothes and even bought a Vespa for 1.3 million lire, an exorbitant amount for his family. The Quadraro Carabinieri, led by lieutenant Dino Formato, discovered that Luca had met a man in a local supermarket and that he had started to frequent him and his home, often helping him carry the shopping home. This man was immediately identified as Elvino Gargiulo.

After searching Gargiulo's home, investigators found Luca's Vespa partially dismantled. Gargiulo said he knew Luca and that Luca had sold him the Vespa for 250,000 lire, but he still became the main suspect in the boy's disappearance. A few days later, Luca's parents received a letter marked Alitalia with the following text:

“Dear Mamma, I’m going with a friend where I’ll be fine because he has a bar and he loves me.”

The handwriting analysis revealed that it was Luca's handwriting, but that the letter was thought to have been written in a moment of excessive euphoria, probably caused by drugs.

=== The confession of Mario Gargiulo ===
During the stakeouts in front of Gargiulo's house, the investigators often noticed his son Mario entering and leaving the house. After identifying him as Elvino Gargiulo's son, they discovered that he was homosexual. An undercover carabiniere was sent to speak to Mario, and the conversations between the two were recorded. No useful information emerged about Luca Amorese, but Mario spoke of another crime committed with the complicity of his father: the double homicide of Luigina Giumento and Valentina Paladini, which occurred in September 1991. It was learned that Elvino forced Mario to have sexual intercourse with Giumento, a 57-year-old prostitute who had been living in the Gargiulo house for some time together with her 10-year-old niece Valentina Paladini. Mario described his father's unspeakable violence towards the two women ("kicks and punches, the little girl was badly beaten because she wasn't eating") and talked about that sexual intercourse that went badly with Giumento.

Being homosexual, Mario had not partaken and the woman had mocked him and threatened to reveal his homosexuality to Elvino. Blinded by rage, Mario allegedly strangled Giumento to death. Later, Elvino also allegedly stabbed Valentina to death to prevent her from telling what had happened. Both father and son allegedly burned the bodies and then buried the remains in the garden, where some charred human bones were indeed found. A few days later, again on the programme Chi l'ha visto? an anonymous phone call involved a man who publicly accused Elvino Gargiulo of having killed Luigina and Valentina.

=== The arrest and the trial ===
On 12 December 1995, the prosecutor Giancarlo Armati requested and obtained the precautionary custody of the father and son. Brought back to the scene of the crime, Mario confirmed his first confession despite having changed his version in the previous days: he had in fact said that Luigina and Valentina had gone away with some gypsies and that he had not seen them again, but during the inspection of the shack in Via Demetriade he reiterated the version given at the beginning. Elvino and Mario were sent to trial for double homicide, and on 11 April 1997, the Assize Court of Rome issued the first-degree sentence for the murder of Luigina Giumento and Valentina Paladini: Elvino was sentenced to 24 years of imprisonment, while the sentence given to his son Mario was more lenient (16 years) thanks to the mitigating circumstances and that of semi-mental infirmity.

=== Developments in the Luca Amorese case ===
Also strongly suspected of the disappearance of Luca Amorese, on 13 January 1998 Gargiulo was sent to trial by the PM Francesco Dall'Olio on charges of having killed Luca and having committed acts of violent lust on two of the boy's sisters. A friend of Gargiulo testified that in 1991 he had asked her to write on the envelope then sent to Luca's family, he declared that he could not do so due to some vision problems but the friend refused. The investigators discovered that the sheet of paper used to write that letter had been torn from an Alitalia diary, found in Gargiulo's home. On 23 March 1998 Elvino Gargiulo was sentenced to 5 years in prison by the IX section of the Court of Rome, which held him responsible for sexual violence on the three minors but acquitted him of the charge of having kidnapped Luca because "the fact does not exist".

The appeal verdict completely overturned the first-instance verdict, and on 20 December 2000, Gargiulo was found guilty of the murder of Luca Amorese and sentenced to 22 years in prison. Luca's body was never found.

=== Death ===
Gargiulo died in prison in 2005, for reasons that remain unknown to this day. He was suspected to have been beaten to death by other inmates.

== Impact on culture ==
A two-episode docuseries called "Il mostro del Quadraro" was filmed based on Gargiulo's story, written and created by Antonio Plescia in 2021.
