= Ronny Rieken =

German child murderer (born 1968)

Ronny Rieken (born 12 February 1968) is a convicted German child murderer. In 1996 and 1998, he killed two girls in the area surrounding Cloppenburg, northern Germany. Rieken was the first German criminal to be caught as a result of mass DNA screening. In 1998, he was sentenced to life imprisonment, which he is serving at Justizvollzugsanstalt Celle.

== Murders ==
On 11 June 1996, Rieken abducted 13-year-old Ulrike Everts from Jeddeloh II as she drove with her pony carriage at the Dortmunder Moorweg in Wardenburg. He abused her in a canal near Kampe, near a meat-processing factory where he had abused an 11-year-old five months earlier. Afterwards, he returned her garments to her one by one to put on, then strangled her with a diaper cloth and dumped her body 40 kilometres away in the Ipweger Moor. Her remains were found in July 1998.

On 16 March 1998, shortly after 5 PM, Rieken saw 11-year-old Christina Nytsch from Saterland, Cloppenburg, a few hundred yards from her parents' house, dragged her off her bicycle and drove her towards the Kampe canal, where he had raped and beaten Everts. When she refused to undress, he beat her and drove her to a forest near Lorup. There he forced her to undress before strangling her with a cable and stabbing the body several times with a knife. Six days later, hunters found Nytsch's body 20 kilometres from her home, barely covered up with branches and covered in hematomas. She had been raped a total of six times.

In the largest manhunt in German criminal history, 1,500 square kilometres were searched with the help of thousands of volunteers. The Bundeswehr had also supported the search, surveying with thermographic cameras from the air. Traces of Rieken's semen which were found on Nytsch's body linked him to the 1996 abuse of a 9-year-old. During Easter of 1998, as a result of a mass DNA screening, Rieken was arrested and convicted. Rieken agreed to the saliva test because his brother-in-law had suggested he should go. He was the first murderer in Germany to agree to a saliva test and be convicted, contributing significantly to the public and legal acceptance of this method. As early as April 1998, while the search for Rieken was still underway, the DNA analysis files, a composite application by the State Criminal Police Offices and the Federal Criminal Police Office, commenced operations.

== Trial and imprisonment ==
In Rieken's trial before the jury, it was said that he had been abused by his father in his childhood. The presiding judge, who had already sentenced Rieken in 1989 for the rape of his sister, expressed doubts about his father's sexual abuse. Rieken had committed his first rape at the age of 19, on a girl from the neighbourhood. At 21, he raped his sister, who was two years younger than he was. Rieken had choked her with a belt until she was unconscious in order to subsequently rape her twice without resistance from her.

During his imprisonment for the rape of his sister, he did not receive therapy but was treated only for alcoholism. His original prison term of ten years had been reduced to five and a half years after he appealed the verdict. Because of good behaviour, Rieken was released after just three years. A few weeks later, he abused the daughter of his future brother-in-law.

The appeal lodged by Rieken against his last sentence was rejected in 1999 by the Federal Court of Justice.

The Oldenburg district court sentenced him to life imprisonment, resulting in a minimum detention of well over 15 years. He is now serving his sentence at Celle Prison. In March 2012, it was found that Rieken had not worked up his deeds and therefore will not be released before 2021 at the earliest. On 9 May 2012, this decision was confirmed by the Celle Court, making it legally binding.

== In prison ==
Rieken is a father of three and a former sailor. During his first prison term, he began an apprenticeship as a machinist, which he completed shortly after his premature release.

== Reading ==
- Heinrich Thies: Ronny Rieken. Porträt eines Kindermörders; Springe: zu Klampen, 2005; ISBN 3-934920-54-3
- Thomas Hombert: Der freiwillige genetische Massentest. Verfassungsrechtliche Zulässigkeit und Grenzen unter Darstellung des Falls Christina Nytsch; Göttingen, Univ., Diss., 2003; Göttingen: Cuvillier, 2003; ISBN 3-89873-819-1

== Documentary Film ==
- Annette Baumeister, Jobst Knigge: Ronny Rieken – der Mädchenmörder. Die großen Kriminalfälle Radio Bremen, 2007
