= Death Valley Germans =

Solved 1996 missing persons case

The Death Valley Germans, as dubbed by the media, were a family of four tourists from Germany who went missing in Death Valley National Park, on the California–Nevada border in the United States, on July 23, 1996. Their rental van was discovered in a remote area of the park in October 1996. Despite an intense search-and-rescue operation, the only thing found was a discarded beer bottle; no other trace of the family was discovered, and the search was called off.

In 2009, two volunteer explorers searching for clues to the fate of the tourists discovered the remains of the two adult members of the family a few miles from where the van had been left.

== Background ==
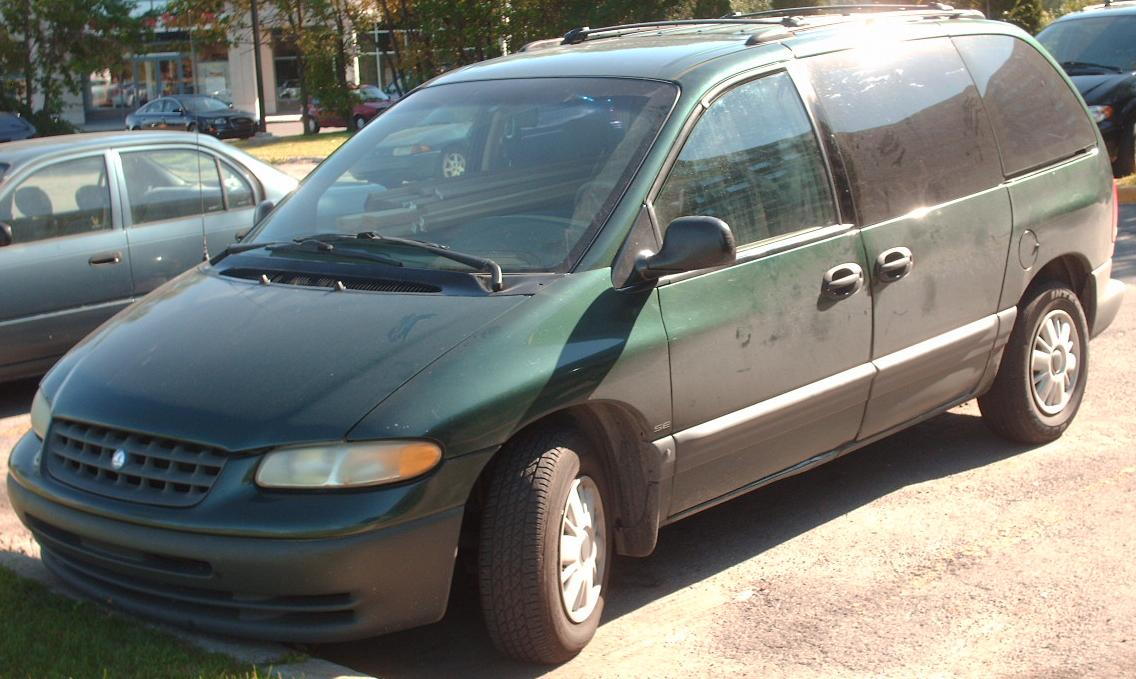
Green 1996 Plymouth Voyager four-door similar to the van rented

The family members were 34-year-old architect Egbert Rimkus, his eleven-year-old son Georg Weber, Rimkus's 27-year-old girlfriend Cornelia Meyer and her four-year-old son Max Meyer, all of whom were from Dresden, Germany. The group arrived in the United States on July 8, 1996, at Seattle–Tacoma International Airport, immediately flying on to Los Angeles International Airport, where they rented a green 1996 Plymouth Voyager minivan. They spent some time in the San Clemente area of Southern California, then drove to the Las Vegas Valley, where they stayed at the Treasure Island Hotel and Casino. During the trip, Rimkus called his bank in Germany and had $1,500 wired to them in California; he later faxed his ex-wife asking for additional funds, which were never sent.

The family then drove to Death Valley National Park on July 22, where they bought a German translation of a guide to Death Valley at the Furnace Creek Visitors Center and spent their first night camping out in Hanaupah Canyon near Telescope Peak. The next day, they traveled to various tourist sites, with Cornelia signing the names of all the family members on a visitors' log at an abandoned mining camp. Along with the names, she wrote that they would be headed over the pass, most likely indicating Mengel Pass. A U.S. flag taken from the Geologist's Cabin in Butte Valley was later discovered in their van, making it clear they had also visited that location.

== Disappearance and search ==
The family had booked a flight from Los Angeles International Airport to return to Germany on July 27, 1996, but there was no evidence that they boarded the flight or departed the United States. Rimkus's ex-wife Heike Weber became concerned when her ex-husband and son did not return from their vacation, and she began to inquire about their whereabouts.

On October 21, 1996, the family's rental minivan was discovered in an extremely remote area in the southwest corner of the park known as Anvil Springs Canyon (35.9272°N 117.0249°W), by a ranger who was part of a routine search by helicopter for illegal drug manufacturing labs. Subsequent inspection found that three of the van's tires were flat, the wheels damaged by driving over rocky terrain, and that the vehicle had been driven in that condition for more than two miles (3.2 km). The van, which had been reported stolen by the rental company, was determined to be the one rented to the tourists. A brand-new Coleman sleeping bag, tent, numerous toys and an unused tire jack were found inside the van.

In the following days, over 200 search-and-rescue workers conducted an extensive search of the area near the minivan. The search cost around $80,000 (equivalent to $164,000 in 2025) and included over 45 searchers at almost all times. Groups involved included the China Lake Mountain Rescue Group and the Indian Wells Valley Search and Rescue Group. The search failed to yield any clues to the whereabouts of the family except for a single beer bottle discovered under a bush over one mile (1.6 km) away from the stranded vehicle (35.9289°N 116.9980°W). A ledge had been cleared next to the beer bottle with a seat mark indicating that one of the tourists, presumably Rimkus due to the size of the mark, had used it for shade.

On October 26, 1996, authorities called off the search.

== Discovery of remains ==
Key locations
1 Warm Springs Camp, where Cornelia wrote in the visitors' log about going over the pass
2 Geologist's Cabin, where the family acquired the flag later found in the minivan
3 Mengel Pass, impassable to the family's minivan
4 Location of the family's stranded rental minivan
5 Location of the discarded beer bottle and seat marks
6 Location of skeletal remains discovered in November 2009
7 Naval Air Weapons Station China Lake base perimeter

On November 12, 2009, Les Walker and Tom Mahood, two off-duty search-and-rescue personnel who were looking for traces of the family, discovered the skeletal remains of two adults (35.8674°N 116.9747°W), one male and one female, and identification belonging to the tourists near the remains, including Cornelia's passport and bank ID. Other belongings such as a journal with German writing and a wine bottle were found and attributed to the missing family. Although DNA was recovered only from the bones of Rimkus, authorities said they were fairly certain that the bones belonged to the missing tourists. The remains of the children were never officially discovered, although the sole of a shoe, possibly from one of the children, was found. Supposedly, bones resembling those of children were found by searchers near where the adults' remains were found, but no official report was made following up on this discovery.

Mahood speculated that while vacationing in Death Valley on July 23, 1996, the family might have been short on time and wanted to visit Yosemite National Park on their way back to Los Angeles. They might have attempted to take a shortcut to Yosemite along a difficult route. He initially believed they might have seen a microwave relay tower and approached it for help, but his fieldwork revealed that the tower would not have been visible from their route. Mahood then theorized that after their vehicle became stranded in the wash, the family traveled on foot southwards to seek help at Naval Air Weapons Station China Lake, where they may have expected to find a well-patrolled fenced perimeter, a common feature of military bases in Germany but not of military bases in the desert areas of the Southwestern United States. The family likely succumbed to heat stroke (average high temperature of 116.5 °F [46.9 °C] in July), dehydration and lack of shelter halfway to the base perimeter.

== See also ==
- Lists of solved missing person cases
