= Murder of Vera Holland =

1996 murder in Reading, Berkshire, England

- Location: Reading, Berkshire, England
- Date: 14–16 November 1996
- Attack type: Homicide by strangulation
- Victim: Vera Holland
- Perpetrator: Unknown
- Motive: Unknown

On 16 November 1996, Vera Holland, a 47-year-old woman, was found dead on a roadside near Reading, Berkshire. She had been strangled to death and her body set alight; her murder remains unsolved.

== Background ==
Vera Holland (born 1948 or 1949) lived with her husband, Brian, on St Barnabas Road in Shinfield Rise, south Reading, Berkshire. She was a mother of three and grandmother of seven.

== Disappearance and death ==
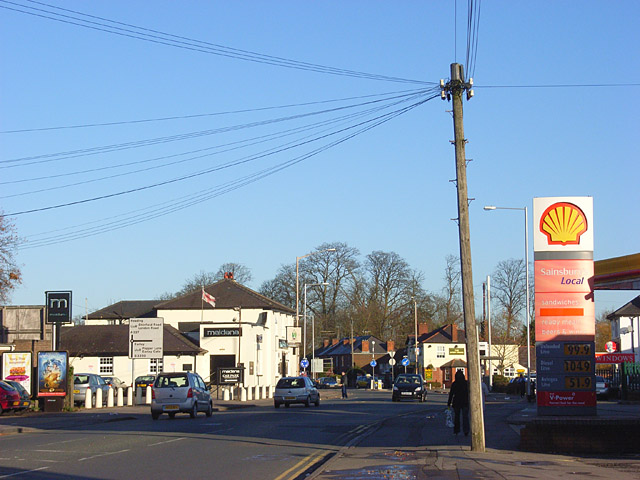
Shinfield Road, south Reading

At 6:10 pm on 14 November 1996, Holland left her home to make a three-minute walk to the KFC restaurant on Shinfield Road. She was wearing a three-quarter-length pink coat, green tartan skirt, black jumper and black shoes. The time of year meant that it was dark when she left. There was no sign of her on CCTV reaching her destination, and it is believed that she never made it to the restaurant. Brian reported her missing at 10.45 pm when she had failed to return home.

At 5:30 am on 16 November, a member of the public alerted the fire service to a blaze by the side of the A327 between Shinfield and Arborfield, at an illegal fly-tipping site at Two Bridges. The site was approximately three miles (4.8 km) south of Holland's home.

After the fire had been extinguished, Holland's body was discovered in a carpet. Traces of her blood were found on the carpet and she was partially clothed in her undergarments There was no sign of sexual assault. The other items of clothing which Vera had been wearing at the time of her disappearance were found in the burning pile.

== Aftermath ==
Holland's post-mortem found that she had died of strangulation, and she had bruising to her face. Her funeral was held at Reading Crematorium in Caversham on 20 June 1997.

On 16 October 1997, an inquest recorded a verdict of unlawful killing. The East Berkshire coroner, Robert Wilson, told the inquest, "It looks like the person who did this will get away with it."

== Investigation ==
Eighty police officers from Thames Valley Police were involved in the investigation into Holland's death in the first year. At the height of the investigation 1,669 people were interviewed and 777 statements were taken. Over 100,000 leaflets appealing for information were sent out to local people.

Fingerprint and blood tests were carried out on Brian Holland and the family home was sealed for three days while forensic teams searched the house, removing over 100 forensic samples. Road checks were held where her body had been found, and a female police officer reenacted Holland's walk to KFC. In February 1997, police put up road signs in the area where Holland's body was found, appealing for information.

Witness statements provided police with a number of leads regarding vehicles in the area at the time:

- Two sightings of a light-coloured Ford Fiesta shortly after 5 am on 16 November near the entrance to Hall Farm, across the bridge from where Holland's body had been found. It was seen to drive off at speed on to the farm estate.
- A white Transit van seen several times for lengthy spells on 15 November in the location of Two Bridges.
- A black Ford Granada was seen in the area on the night of Holland's disappearance.

=== The carpet ===
In February 1997, the police made an appeal for more information about the carpet in which Holland's body had been found. It was a section of bedroom quality carpet measuring 9 feet 4 inches (2.84 m) by 8 feet 2 inches (2.49 m) and was fawn or beige. It had two furniture-sized indentations on one side – possibly from matching pieces of bedroom furniture – and two radiator pipe holes on the opposite side. Soil and weeds growing on the carpet led police to believe that it had previously been stored outside. Police believed that Holland's body had been left inside the carpet for more than a day before it was taken to the fly-tip. They believed she was killed and then placed in the carpet until the evening of 15 November; witnesses stated that Holland's body was not at the site before 4 pm. After the appeal was made, police said that almost forty people contacted them with information about the carpet.

=== Arrests ===
At 6:30 am on 17 December 1996, Holland's second husband and his wife were arrested. They lived just a few houses from the Hollands. They were released on bail after 13 hours of questioning.

In January 1997, Brian Holland was arrested in connection with Vera's death. He was held for a day before being released on police bail. In March 1997, Brian threatened to take legal action against Thames Valley Police over the handling of the case.

=== Later developments ===
In November 2016, on the 20th anniversary of Holland's death, two of her children made a new appeal for information alongside Thames Valley Police. When asked at the time about a possible connection of her death with imprisoned serial killer Christopher Halliwell, the head of Thames Valley police's major crime review team responded that he would "keep Halliwell in mind".

In January 2017, Thames Valley Police announced that new witnesses had come forward leading to further investigations, but no arrests had been made.

== See also ==
- List of solved missing person cases
