= Paul Brumfitt =

Convicted English serial killer

- Born: 1956 (age 69–70); England, United Kingdom
- Convictions: Manslaughter x2 Murder x1
- Penalty: Life imprisonment x3 (first murders); Life imprisonment x3

Details
- Victims: 3
- Span of crimes: 1979–1999
- Country: England, Denmark
- States: Essex, Southern Denmark, West Midlands
- Date apprehended: March 1999

Paul Brumfitt (born 1956) is an English criminal convicted of killing three people in the United Kingdom and Denmark. In 1980 he was convicted of two counts of manslaughter and sentenced to three life sentences. He was released in 1994, only to kill yet again in 1999 and be returned to prison.

== Initial murders and detention ==
With convictions dating back to 1968, Brumfitt's first murders began in July 1979, when he got into an argument with his 16-year-old girlfriend. In his anger, he went on an 8-day rampage, first strangling 59-year-old shopkeeper Sidney Samuel in Tilbury, Essex. Afterwards, he jumped aboard a ferry and found himself in Denmark, where not long after he strangled to death 40-year-old bus driver Teddy Laustrup in Esbjerg.

He was quickly caught and returned to England to stand trial at the Old Bailey for the two murders there, and in August 1980, he pleaded guilty to two counts of manslaughter on the grounds of diminished responsibility. The presiding judge recognized that the defendant suffered from several psychiatric disorders, but nevertheless ordered that he be sentenced to three life sentences. He remained in prison until November 1994, when psychiatrists declared that he no longer posed a threat to society, and Brumfitt was released from prison. As per the conditions of his parole, he was employed by the Dudley Council as a temporary assistant gardener under the Rehabilitation of Offenders Act, had to be strictly supervised and had to spend six months at a hostel before he could be allowed full release.

== Murder of Marcella Davis ==
Unbeknownst to his probation officer, Brumfitt regularly visited sex workers in Dudley's red-light district. On 7 February 1999 he picked up 19-year-old Marcella Ann Davis, a sex worker on Wolverhampton's Shakespeare Street, and took her back to his flat in Woodsetton. There, he murdered her in an undetermined manner and then took Marcella's body to a small yard he had rented on Cooper Street, where he dismembered her and set her alight.

While authorities were searching for Davis, Brumfitt continued picking up various sex workers, several of whom he raped. In March 1999, he was arrested on suspicion of killing Davis but initially refused to cooperate with authorities. After 30 hours had passed, he finally admitted to the murder and pointed investigators towards where he had buried her. Through the use of dental records and a small bunch of keys, the burned corpse was positively identified as that of Davis.

== Trial, imprisonment and aftermath ==
Shortly afterwards, Brumfitt was brought to stand trial at Birmingham Crown Court, where he was convicted of killing Marcella Davis and twice raping another sex worker at knifepoint, for which he was given three additional life sentences, but acquitted of a third rape.

The chief constable of West Midlands Police, Edward Crew, and Conservative MP Michael Fabricant, both criticised the decision to release Brumfitt. The prison service announced that it would consider revising the parole review process, in order to prevent potentially violent lifers from being released and causing more crimes.

== See also ==
- List of serial killers in the United Kingdom
- Alun Kyte, fellow killer of prostitutes in the Midlands

== Bibliography ==
- Michael Newton (2006). The Encyclopedia of Serial Killers. Infobase Publishing. ISBN 0816069875.
- David Wilson (1 July 2007). Serial Killers: Hunting Britons and Their Victims, 1960 to 2006. Waterside Press. ISBN 978-1906534417.
- David Wilson (15 October 2009). A History of British Serial Killing: The Shocking Account of Jack the Ripper, Shipman and Beyond. Hachette UK. ISBN 978-0748111725.
- Hilary Kinnell (11 January 2013). Violence and Sex Work in Britain. Routledge. ISBN 978-1134024438.
