= Hellgrammite =

Hellgrammite may refer to:

- Hellgrammite (comics)
- Hellgrammite, the larval form of the dobsonfly
