= True Crime with Aphrodite Jones =

American TV documentary series (2010–2016)

- Genre: Documentary
- Starring: Aphrodite Jones
- Country of origin: United States
- Original language: English
- No. of seasons: 6
- No. of episodes: 63

Production
- Executive producers: Jeanie Vink; Lloyd Fales
- Producer: Bruce Kennedy
- Running time: 42 to 43 minutes
- Production company: Peacock Productions

Original release
- Network: Investigation Discovery
- Release: March 11, 2010 – July 18, 2016

True Crime with Aphrodite Jones is an American television documentary series airing on Investigation Discovery, hosted by Aphrodite Jones. The show was very similar in format to On the Case with Paula Zahn. Jones presents her take on crimes, often accompanied with footage, evidence and interviews. The series ran for six seasons, from March 2010 to July 2016.

== Episodes ==
Season	Episodes	Originally released	
Season	Episodes	First released	Last released
1	10	March 11, 2010	May 13, 2010
2	10	March 31, 2011	June 16, 2011
3	10	January 7, 2013	March 11, 2013
4	13	October 17, 2013	January 16, 2014
5	10	March 16, 2015	May 25, 2015
6	10	May 2, 2016	July 18, 2016

=== Season 1 (2010) ===
No. overall	No. in season	Title	Original release date
1	1	"Scott Peterson"	March 11, 2010
2	2	"O. J. Simpson"	March 18, 2010
3	3	"Staircase Killer"	March 25, 2010
4	4	"Phil Spector"	April 1, 2010
5	5	"Zodiac Killer"	April 8, 2010
6	6	"Dog Mauling"	April 15, 2010
7	7	"Menendez Brothers"	April 22, 2010
8	8	"Michael Jackson"	April 29, 2010
9	9	"Skylar Deleon"	May 6, 2010
10	10	"Chandra Levy"	May 13, 2010

=== Season 2 (2011) ===
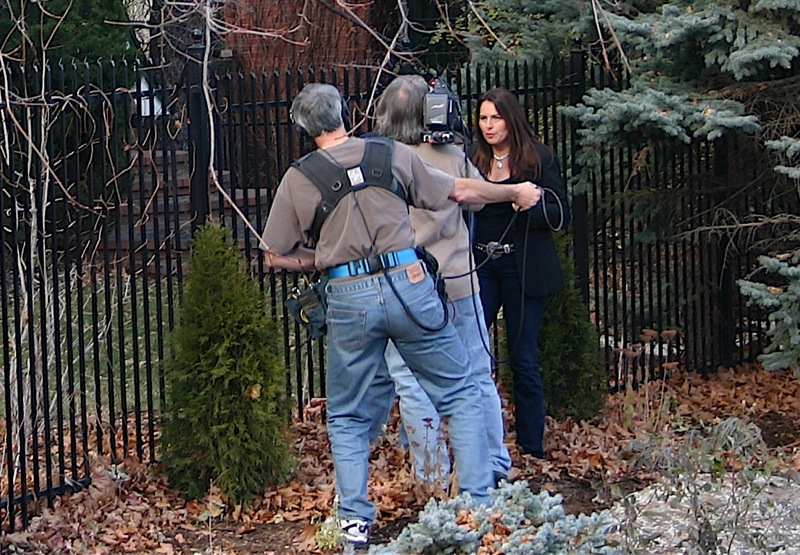
Filming of Episode 11, in Boulder, Colorado, in 2010

No. overall	No. in season	Title	Original release date
11	1	"JonBenét Ramsey"	March 31, 2011
12	2	"Anna Nicole Smith"	April 7, 2011
13	3	"Killer Contestant"	April 14, 2011
14	4	"Loyalty, Lies, and Loss"	April 21, 2011
15	5	"Twist of Faith"	April 28, 2011
16	6	"West Memphis Three"	May 5, 2011
17	7	"Casting A Killer"	May 12, 2011
18	8	"A Tragic Testimony"	May 19, 2011
19	9	"Children of Thunder"	May 26, 2011
20	10	"A Woman Scorned"	June 16, 2011

=== Season 3 (2013) ===
No. overall	No. in season	Title	Original release date
21	1	"Sex & Death in the OC"	January 7, 2013
Eric Naposki
22	2	"Casey Anthony Bella Vita"	January 14, 2013
Death of Caylee Anthony
23	3	"To Catch a Killer"	January 21, 2013
Murder of Kenia Monge in Denver
24	4	"Chosen to Kill"	January 28, 2013
Jeffrey Locker
25	5	"A Bite, a Bullet, & a Broken Heart"	February 4, 2013
Murder of Sherri Rasmussen
26	6	"Loved to Death"	February 11, 2013
Murder of Susan Johnston in Oklahoma City
27	7	"Blood Money"	February 18, 2013
Murders of Bernice and Ben Novack Jr.
28	8	"Girl, Gone"	February 25, 2013
Murder of Kristin Smart
29	9	"Burning Passions"	March 4, 2013
Death of Sandy Maloney in Green Bay, Wisconsin
30	10	"Confessions and Lies"	March 11, 2013
Dixmoor 5

=== Season 4 (2013–14) ===
No. overall	No. in season	Title	Original release date
31	1	"Sins of the Father"	October 17, 2013
Murder of Betty Schirmer in Lebanon, Pennsylvania
32	2	"Good People, Badlands"	October 24, 2013
Murder of Susan Casey in Glendive, Montana
33	3	"Taylor's Tale"	October 31, 2013
Murder of Taylor Behl
34	4	"Sex, Death and Videotape"	November 7, 2013
Murder of Michelle Le
35	5	"Paging Dr. Essa"	November 14, 2013
Murder of Rosemarie Essa
36	6	"The Mystery of Steve McNair"	November 21, 2013
37	7	"A Hollywood Hit"	December 5, 2013
Claudia Haro
38	8	"Never Too Late"	December 12, 2013
Murder of David Jackson in Pembroke Pines, Florida
39	9	"The Ballad of Billi-Jo"	December 19, 2013
Billi Jo Smallwood
40	10	"The Devil at the Daycare"	December 26, 2013
Murder of Rusty Sneiderman in Dunwoody, Georgia
41	11	"A Deadly Downfall"	January 2, 2014
Steve Nunn
42	12	"The Cleveland Conudrum"	January 9, 2014
Murder of Matthew Podolak
43	13	"Murder on Route 91"	January 16, 2014
Murder of Elizabeth Begaren in Anaheim, California

=== Season 5 (2015) ===
No. overall	No. in season	Title	Original release date
44	1	"Guilty Until Proven Innocent"	March 16, 2015
Wromngful Conviction of Tyrone Hood
45	2	"What Happens in Vegas..."	March 23, 2015
Attempted Murder of Robert Bessey
46	3	"A Halloween Horror Story"	March 30, 2015
Murder of Felicia Ruiz in Houston
47	4	"Memories of Murder"	April 6, 2015
Murder of Nilsa Padilla in Key Biscayne, Florida
48	5	"A New Set of Eyes"	April 13, 2015
Murder of Joey Martin in Kingston, New York
49	6	"Father Doesn't Know Best"	April 20, 2015
Karl Karlsen
50	7	"Broken Commandments"	April 27, 2015
Mary Jane Fonder
51	8	"Cold Case in Hotlanta"	May 4, 2015
Murder of William Eric Clark in Atlanta
52	9	"Virtual Drive-By"	May 18, 2015
Murder of Maribel Ramos in Orange, California
53	10	"Every Move She Makes"	May 25, 2015
Murder of Rachael Anderson in Moscow, Idaho

=== Season 6 (2016) ===
No. overall	No. in season	Title	Original release date
54	1	"A Murder & an Open Marriage"	May 2, 2016
Murder of Ellen Sherman in Niantic, Connecticut
55	2	"Road to Nowhere"	May 9, 2016
Ralph Howard Benson
56	3	"Discreet House Cleaning"	May 16, 2016
Murder of Heidi Bernadzikowski in Baltimore
57	4	"Sex, Drugs and Murder"	May 23, 2016
Murder of Danny Coleman in St. Louis
58	5	"Blood Brotherhood"	May 30, 2016
Murder of Roger Butch Pratt in Akron, Ohio
59	6	"A Deadly Dream"	June 13, 2016
Murder of Ernest Tolbert in York, South Carolina
60	7	"Head Case"	June 20, 2016
Murder of Lori Anne Schwegel in Whitefish, Montana
61	8	"Homicide in the Heartland"	June 27, 2016
Murder of Rose Goggins in Lawrenceburg, Tennessee
62	9	"Burning Man"	July 11, 2016
Murder of Louis Saulnier in St. Petersburg, Florida
63	10	"Too Young to Die"	July 18, 2016
Murder of Annie Kasprzak in Draper, Utah
