= The Staircase (American miniseries) =

American crime drama television miniseries

- Promotional poster
- Genre: Biographical; Crime drama
- Created by: Antonio Campos
- Based on: The Staircase by Jean-Xavier de Lestrade
- Showrunners: Antonio Campos; Maggie Cohn
- Written by: Antonio Campos; Maggie Cohn; Emily Kaczmarek; Craig Shilowich
- Directed by: Antonio Campos; Leigh Janiak
- Starring: Colin Firth; Toni Collette; Michael Stuhlbarg; Dane DeHaan; Olivia DeJonge; Patrick Schwarzenegger; Sophie Turner; Odessa Young; Rosemarie DeWitt; Tim Guinee; Parker Posey; Juliette Binoche; Vincent Vermignon
- Composers: Danny Bensi & Saunder Jurriaans
- Country of origin: United States
- Original languages: English; French
- No. of episodes: 8

Production
- Executive producers: Megan Ellison; Sue Naegle; Ali Krug; Carol Cuddy; Maggie Cohn; Antonio Campos
- Producers: Emily Kaczmarek; Craig Shilowich; Randall Poster; Christina M. Fitzgerald; Marsha L. Swinton
- Cinematography: Lyle Vincent; Michael Svitak
- Editors: Sofia Subercaseaux; Shelby Siegel; Eric Spang; Christopher Rand
- Running time: 59–73 minutes
- Production companies: Annapurna Television; Emipop; What's Up Films

Original release
- Network: HBO Max
- Release: May 5 – June 9, 2022

The Staircase is an American biographical crime drama television miniseries created by Antonio Campos, based on the 2004 true crime French docuseries of the same name created by Jean-Xavier de Lestrade. The series stars Colin Firth as Michael Peterson, a writer convicted of murdering his wife Kathleen Peterson (Toni Collette), who was found dead at the bottom of the staircase in their home. The series premiered on HBO Max on May 5, 2022.

== Premise ==
Michael Peterson, a novelist, is accused of killing his wife Kathleen after she is found dead at the bottom of a staircase in their home. As the investigation continues, the family is thrown into a tumultuous legal battle. Meanwhile, a French documentary team takes an interest in the story.

== Cast and characters ==
=== Main ===
- Colin Firth as Michael Peterson, a novelist and political hopeful in Durham, North Carolina. His finances and personal life become the focus of the investigation and documentary.
- Toni Collette as Kathleen Peterson, his second wife, who was a high-powered executive and well-liked by her family and community. She has a daughter, Caitlin, from her first marriage.
- Michael Stuhlbarg as David Rudolf, Michael's lawyer
- Dane DeHaan as Clayton Peterson, Michael Peterson's oldest son from his first marriage. He has his own legal issues and served time in prison.
- Olivia DeJonge as Caitlin Atwater, Kathleen's daughter from her first marriage. She initially supports her stepfather.
- Patrick Schwarzenegger as Todd Peterson, Michael's youngest son from his first marriage
- Sophie Turner as Margaret Ratliff, Michael's adopted daughter, whom he adopted after the deaths of her biological parents
- Odessa Young as Martha Ratliff, Margaret's younger sister, who also was adopted by Michael
- Rosemarie DeWitt as Candace (Hunt) Zamperini, Kathleen's sister
- Tim Guinee as Bill Peterson, Michael's brother
- Parker Posey as Freda Black, a Durham County prosecutor
- Juliette Binoche as Sophie Brunet, editor of the French documentary series
- Vincent Vermignon as Jean-Xavier de Lestrade, director of the French documentary

=== Recurring ===
- Joel McKinnon Miller as Larry Pollard, a lawyer who is neighbors and friends with the Petersons
- Maria Dizzia as Lori (Hunt) Campbell, Kathleen and Candace's sister
- Susan Pourfar as Dr Deborah Radisch
- Justice Leak as Tom Maher
- Robert Crayton as Ron Guerette
- Cullen Moss as Jim Hardin, the Durham County District Attorney, whom Michael had regularly criticized in columns about him and his office.
- Cory Scott Allen as Art Holland
- Morgan Henard as Dennis Rowe, a childhood neighbor and friend of Kathleen and Lori's, and eventual hookup of Michael's.
- Jason Davis as Fred Atwater, Kathleen's first husband and father to Caitlin
- Ryan Lewis as Bruce Campbell, Lori's husband
- Hannah Pniewski as Becky, Clayton Peterson's wife
- Kevin Sizemore as Mark Zamperini, Candace's husband
- Trini Alvarado as Patricia Sue (Patty) Peterson, Michael's first wife and mother to Todd and Clayton
- Daniela Lee as Devon
- Teri Wyble as Sonya Pfeiffer
- Frank Feys as Denis Poncet, the producer of the French documentary
- Andre Martin as Yves, Jean-Xavier's boom operator
- Jean-Luc McMurtry as Gaultier, Sophie's assistant editor
- Monika Gossmann as Agnes

== Episodes ==
No.	Title	Directed by	Written by	Original release date
1	"911"	Antonio Campos	Antonio Campos	May 5, 2022
On December 9, 2001, in Durham, North Carolina, author and local politician Michael Peterson calls 911 after supposedly finding his wife, Kathleen, unconscious and bleeding at the bottom of the staircase. Kathleen is declared dead. However, the nature of her injuries causes local law enforcement to believe that Michael might have been involved in her death, leading to him being charged for her murder. Michael gathers his family, which includes Bill, his brother, Clayton and Todd, Michael's sons from his previous marriage, Caitlin Atwater, Kathleen's daughter from her previous marriage, Margaret and Martha Ratliff, Michael's adopted daughters, and Candace Hunt Zamperini and Lori Campbell, Kathleen's sisters. Michael hires defense attorney David Rudolf to represent him in court. The Grand jury indicts him for Kathleen's murder and he is arrested. Meanwhile, prosecutors Freda Black and Jim Hardin meet with Candace and Lori and show them Kathleen's autopsy report and pictures of gay porn that they found in Michael's office and computer, establishing a motive that Kathleen fought with Michael after finding the pictures, leading to her death. This causes the sisters to turn against Michael, believing his guilt. In 2017, Michael is seen out of prison, and in a relationship with another woman.
2	"Chiroptera"	Antonio Campos	Maggie Cohn	May 5, 2022
In 2001, French filmmaker Jean-Xavier de Lestrade and producer Denis Poncet began working on their next documentary when they encounter news about Michael's case. Bill is tasked to explain to the family about Michael's bisexuality. The family takes it well; however, Caitlin begins to doubt Michael after realizing he has been lying to the family. Michael is released on bail, and Rudolf gathers a team of crime scene analysts and forensic experts to prove Michael's innocence. The team theorizes that Kathleen fell down the stairs, attempting to get up and call for help, but fell down again, explaining most of her injuries. However, they couldn't come up with a theory to explain the scratches on her face or her broken thyroid cartilage. Caitlin's belief in Michael's innocence is finally shattered after Black and Hardin show her Kathleen's autopsy report. Candace, meanwhile, comes up with her own theory that Michael used the fireplace poker to beat Kathleen to death.
3	"The Great Dissembler"	Antonio Campos	Antonio Campos	May 5, 2022
In 2002, Jean-Xavier and his team arrive in Durham to begin filming their documentary. Also arriving is Michael's first wife, Patricia Sue Peterson, from Germany. The DA office digs deeper into Michael's case and finds Dennis Rowe, who claims that he slept with Michael a number of times. Hardin, however, dismisses him when he finds out that Rowe also slept with several of his campaign donors. Michael confesses to Bill about his affairs, but claims that Kathleen knew all of it. The DA establishes the blow poke, a gift that Candace gave to each of her siblings, as the murder weapon after the State's Bureau of Investigation was able to replicate the crime using the one Candace gave to them. But they cannot find it anywhere in the Petersons' home. Margaret Blair, Martha and Margaret's maternal aunt, contacts the DA and tells them about her sister's death in Germany 20 years earlier, where she also died at the bottom of the staircase. Michael was the last to see her alive. Elizabeth's initial autopsy in Germany shows that her death was caused by an aneurysm. The DA exhumes Elizabeth's body with the sisters' permission, which they give reluctantly, believing that a second autopsy might help Michael's case. In 2003, Michael's trial finally begins.
4	"Common Sense"	Antonio Campos	Emily Kaczmarek & Craig Shilowich	May 12, 2022
5	"The Beating Heart"	Leigh Janiak	Craig Shilowich	May 19, 2022
6	"Red in Tooth and Claw"	Leigh Janiak	Emily Kaczmarek	May 26, 2022
7	"Seek and Ye Shall"	Antonio Campos	Maggie Cohn	June 2, 2022
8	"America's Sweetheart or: Time Over Time"	Antonio Campos	Antonio Campos	June 9, 2022

== Production ==
=== Development ===
The series is a passion project for Antonio Campos, who began developing a scripted adaptation of the true crime docuseries The Staircase in 2008. On November 21, 2019, it was announced that Annapurna Television had officially put the project into development and was shopping the project to premium networks and streaming services. Campos was attached to write the series, as well as executive produce alongside Harrison Ford. On September 22, 2020, during an interview about his new film The Devil All the Time with Rian Johnson for Interview magazine, Campos revealed that HBO Max had landed the project for development. On March 31, 2021, it was announced that HBO Max had given the project a limited series order consisting of 8 episodes, with Campos set as showrunner and director of 6 of the episodes and American Crime Story's Maggie Cohn joining as writer, executive producer, and co-showrunner. In addition, Ford was no longer attached as executive producer. Upon the series order announcement, Campos said:

This has been a project I have been working on in one way or another since 2008. It's been a long and winding road, but well worth the wait to be able to find partners like HBO Max, Annapurna, co-showrunner Maggie Cohn and the incredible Colin Firth to dramatize such a complex true-life story.

On July 19, 2021, it was announced that Leigh Janiak was set to direct two episodes of the series.

=== Casting ===
Harrison Ford was initially set to star in the lead role of Michael Peterson before being replaced by Colin Firth in March 2021. The following month, Toni Collette joined the cast in a lead role. Rosemarie DeWitt, Juliette Binoche, and Parker Posey were added to the main cast in May 2021, with Sophie Turner, Odessa Young, Patrick Schwarzenegger, Dane DeHaan, Olivia DeJonge, and Michael Stuhlbarg joining the next month. In July 2021, Tim Guinee and Vincent Vermignon joined the cast of the series. In August 2021, Justice Leak was cast in a recurring role.

=== Filming ===
Principal photography for the series began on June 7, 2021, in Atlanta, Georgia, and was scheduled to conclude in November 2021. The final day of filming in Atlanta was Monday, December 13, 2021. The actors on set that day were Odessa Young (Martha Peterson), Trini Alvarado (Patty Peterson), Morgan Henard (Dennis Rowe), Donny Boaz (Tyrone Lacour), Monika Gossmann (Agnes Schafer), and Bastian Gunther (German Father).

== Release ==
The miniseries premiered on May 5, 2022, with the first 3 episodes on HBO Max. The miniseries was released on December 27, 2022, on DVD.

== Reception ==
=== Critical response ===
The series received positive reviews from critics, with praise towards Firth's performance. The review aggregator website Rotten Tomatoes reported a 92% approval rating with an average rating of 7.80/10, based on 71 critic reviews. The website's critics consensus reads, "The Staircase doesn't hold many surprises for those already intimate with the original documentary, but this dramatization brings a fresh perspective and texture to the mystery—along with a terrific performance by Colin Firth." Meanwhile, Metacritic, which uses a weighted average, assigned a score of 80 out of 100 based on 29 critics, indicating "generally favourable reviews".

Members of the original documentary team criticised the series. Creator Jean-Xavier de Lestrade said that he felt "very uncomfortable, because I feel that I’ve been betrayed." The French team particularly criticised the drama series for misrepresenting the relationship between Sophie Brunet and Peterson; they believe it suggested that Brunet and Lestrade made editorial choices in order to portray Peterson in a more sympathetic way. Brunet has said she did not meet and had no relationship with Peterson until after she finished her work on the series for 2004 release. In addition the French team believe that the drama series falsely attributes work done by producer Allyson Luchak to Denis Poncet instead.

Defense attorney David Rudolf also raised concerns about the series' factual accuracy, saying that there were "many things in the first five episodes, which I've seen that are inaccurate, misleading, and outright false." Peterson also criticised the HBO series. He said that he hadn't been informed that the series was being made, and accused de Lestrade of selling out his story to HBO.

=== Accolades ===
Year	Award	Category	Nominee	Result	Ref.
2022	Hollywood Critics Association TV Awards	Best Streaming Limited or Anthology Series	The Staircase	Nominated	
2022	Hollywood Critics Association TV Awards	Best Actor in a Streaming Limited or Anthology Series or Movie	Colin Firth	Nominated	
2022	Hollywood Critics Association TV Awards	Best Actress in a Streaming Limited or Anthology Series or Movie	Toni Collette	Nominated	
2022	Hollywood Critics Association TV Awards	Best Writing in a Streaming Limited or Anthology Series or Movie	Antonio Campos (for "911")	Nominated	
2022	Primetime Emmy Awards	Outstanding Lead Actor in a Limited or Anthology Series or Movie	Colin Firth	Nominated	
2022	Primetime Emmy Awards	Outstanding Lead Actress in a Limited or Anthology Series or Movie	Toni Collette	Nominated	
2022	TCA Awards	Outstanding Achievement in Movies, Miniseries and Specials	The Staircase	Nominated	
2023	Golden Globe Awards	Best Actor - Miniseries or TV Film	Colin Firth	Nominated	
2023	Satellite Awards	Best Miniseries	The Staircase	Nominated	
2023	Satellite Awards	Best Actress - Miniseries or Television Film	Toni Collette	Nominated	
2023	Writers Guild of America Awards	Limited Series	Aisha Bhoori, Antonio Campos, Maggie Cohn, Aja Gabel, Emily Kaczmarek, Craig Shilowich, and Sebastián Silva	Nominated	
