= The Staircase (French miniseries) =

2004 documentary miniseries

- Poster for the 2018 Netflix release
- French: Soupçons
- Genre: Documentary film
- Written by: Jean-Xavier de Lestrade
- Directed by: Jean-Xavier de Lestrade
- Starring: Michael Peterson; David Rudolf; Ron Guerette; Tom Maher; Bill Peterson; Freda Black; Jim Hardin; Arthur Holland
- Country of origin: France
- Original language: English
- No. of episodes: 13

Production
- Executive producer: Denis Poncet
- Producer: Allyson Luchak
- Production locations: Durham, North Carolina; Germany
- Editors: Sophie Brunet; Scott Stevenson
- Running time: 44-55 minutes
- Production company: Maha Productions

Original release
- Network: Canal+
- Release: 7 October 2004 – 30 January 2013
- Network: Netflix
- Release: 8 June 2018

The Staircase (French: Soupçons, lit. 'Suspicions'; also known as Death on the Staircase) is a 2004 French-produced, English-language documentary television miniseries directed by Jean-Xavier de Lestrade about the trial of Michael Peterson, who was convicted in 2003 of murdering his wife, Kathleen Peterson.

De Lestrade had won an Oscar for his recent Murder on a Sunday Morning documentary. Attracted to issues in the Peterson case, he arranged to begin filming soon after the indictment. Camera crews were given access to the accused's extended family, the defense attorneys, and the courtroom.

An abbreviated version was broadcast as a special two-hour presentation of American news show Primetime Thursday on July 22, 2004. The miniseries was completed in September 2004, and premiered in October on Canal+, from January 10–14, 2005, on BBC Four (as part of its Storyville documentary series), and from April 4–25 on Sundance Channel.

Lestrade returned to film Peterson and his family in 2012–2013, covering developments in the case that were released as a two-hour sequel. Three new episodes with further updates were later made for Netflix, and in 2018, the streaming channel added all 13 episodes to its catalog, making it available as one series.

== Synopsis ==
In December 2001, war novelist Michael Peterson called emergency services to report that his wife Kathleen had fallen down a set of stairs in their Forest Hills mansion and died. The authorities disbelieved Peterson's story that Kathleen had fallen while drunk and concluded instead that he had bludgeoned her to death, most likely with a fireplace tool called a blow poke (a gift from Kathleen's sister, which appeared to be missing from the house). Peterson was soon charged with murder. The documentary series detailed the ensuing case from the point of view of Peterson and his legal-defense team, led by attorney David Rudolf.

During the trial, it was revealed that while the Petersons were living in Germany, his dear friend Elizabeth Ratliff (his best friend's widow and the mother of his future adopted daughters) had died ostensibly from an intra-cerebral haemorrhage. She fell down stairs after collapsing, and suffered head injuries (but no skull fracture) similar to those later sustained by Kathleen Peterson. An investigation by German police and U.S. military authorities concluded that the death was accidental (a subsequent exhumation and autopsy disputed the claim of accidental death).

The prosecution introduced Ratliff's death into the trial as an incident that may have given Peterson the idea of how to fake the true cause of Kathleen's death. During the trial, Peterson's two adopted daughters supported their father's version of the death. But Kathleen's daughter from her first marriage, and Kathleen's two sisters, soon grew suspicious of Peterson, and split from the rest of the family.

The prosecution argued that Kathleen discovered Michael's bisexuality and pursuit of sexual liaisons with men. Angered, she had a confrontation with him and they had a violent argument that ended in Michael bludgeoning his wife to death.

Peterson claimed that his wife knew intuitively about his sexuality, frequently teased him indirectly about it, understood that was part of who he was, and would have been fine with his arranging to have sex with anonymous men. He claimed to have been outside, by the pool, when Kathleen fell down the stairs and injured herself. A defense team re-creation claimed that Peterson could not hear his wife's cries for help from such a distance.

The jury ultimately convicted Peterson, and he was sentenced to life in prison. However, the verdict was later overturned in 2011, when the judge ruled that one of the prosecution's main witnesses lied under oath. In 2017, while awaiting his new trial, Michael Peterson entered an Alford plea, in which he accepted a charge of voluntary manslaughter and was sentenced to time served, allowing him to end his time in prison and walk away a free man.

== Reception ==
Reviews of The Staircase are generally positive. It won a Peabody Award in 2005. It also won an IDA award for the Limited Series category in 2005.

== Additional episodes ==
In April 2012, it was announced that Lestrade was working on a two-hour follow-up film to The Staircase for French broadcaster Canal+, after Michael Peterson was released from jail, pending a retrial. The sequel, subtitled "Last Chance," premiered at the International Documentary Film Festival Amsterdam in November 2012. It aired on Canal+ on January 30, 2013, and on BBC Four's Storyville on February 4. Sundance Channel aired a shorter alternative cut, presenting "Last Chance" as two new episodes of the original miniseries, airing March 4 and March 11, 2013.

On November 23, 2015, Lestrade announced a second follow-up film at the IDFA Forum. Originally announced as Staircase III, the film documents the story of Peterson's final trial, set for early 2016. The film was commissioned by Canal+. Last Chance producer Matthieu Belghiti of What's Up Films was also attached. It was later picked up by Netflix to be released as three new episodes of the miniseries, together with the previous 10 episodes, on June 8, 2018. The first of the new episodes premiered on April 28, 2018, at the Tribeca Film Festival.

All 13 episodes of the series were released on Netflix on June 8, 2018.

== Episodes ==
| No. in season | Title | Length (minutes) |
|---|---|---|
| 1 | "Crime or Accident?" | 47:00 |
Following his wife's suspicious death, Michael Peterson speaks about his version of the events while lawyers and expert witnesses prepare for trial
| 2 | "Secrets and Lies" | 46:00 |
As Michael's hidden life comes out into the open, defense experts debate if it will have a significant impact on the coming trial.
| 3 | "A Striking Coincidence" | 46:00 |
The defense team is shaken when a suspicious event from the past comes to light. Later, the team visits Michael's first wife in Germany.
| 4 | "A Prosecution Trickery" | 44:00 |
As the trial looms and media attention heats up, an autopsy report's wording ruffles the feathers of the defense team.
| 5 | "A Weak Case" | 47:00 |
The prosecution presents its case while the defense strives to cast a reasonable doubt within the minds of the jury.
| 6 | "The Prosecution's Revenge" | 47:00 |
A witness brings surprising levity to the stand, the judge rules on an important matter, and Michael's alleged temper comes under scrutiny.
| 7 | "The Blow Poke Returns" | 50:00 |
Kathleen's sister pores over Michael's writings. Jurors visit the staircase at Michael's home. A vital piece of evidence reappears.
| 8 | "The Verdict" | 50:00 |
Is Michael Peterson guilty or not guilty? The jury delivers its verdict regarding the mysterious death of his wife, Kathleen.
| 9 | "Reopening the Case" | 55:00 |
Eight years later, the possibility that a key witness for the prosecution may have misled the jury could prompt the need for a new trial.
| 10 | "The Last Chance" | 52:00 |
After more experts testify about the questionable conclusions and claims of Duane Deaver, the judge rules on whether a new trial is necessary.
| 11 | "Looking for Closure" | 52:00 |
Following two and a half years of house arrest, Michael must decide whether to push for a plea or risk his freedom with a new trial.
| 12 | "Between Anger and Despair" | 46:00 |
Their faith in the justice system forever shaken, Michael and his family discuss what they can hope to achieve by continuing the fight.
| 13 | "Flawed Justice" | 46:00 |
Michael speaks to a reporter about the reasons behind his plea. Later, Kathleen's sister delivers a statement of defiance in court.

== Legacy ==
The first season of the 2017 sitcom Trial & Error parodies this documentary and the details of the case.

A miniseries adaptation, co-produced by Annapurna Television and HBO Max, The Staircase, premiered on May 5, 2022. It stars Colin Firth and Toni Collette as Michael and Kathleen Peterson, with Michael Stuhlbarg as David Rudolf, Michael's lawyer, Parker Posey as prosecutor Freda Black, and Juliette Binoche as Sophie Brunet, the editor of the original doc. Antonio Campos is credited as series creator and serves as co-showrunner with Maggie Cohn.
