= Aphrodite Jones =

American writer and TV host

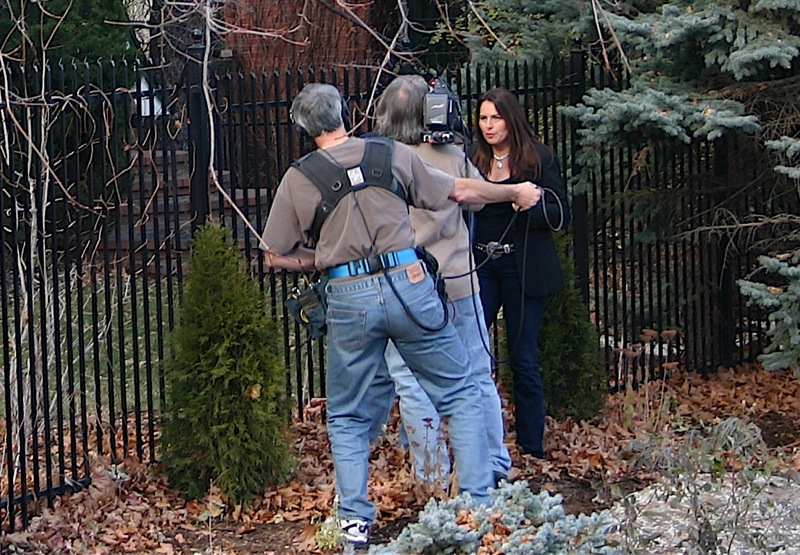
- Filming of an episode of True Crime with Aphrodite Jones in 2010
- Born: November 27, 1958 (age 67); Chicago, Illinois, U.S.
- Occupations: Reporter, author, executive producer

Aphrodite Jones (born November 27, 1958) is an American author, reporter, and television producer.

Jones is an executive producer and the host of the television series True Crime with Aphrodite Jones. Previously, Jones hosted a show called The Justice Hunters for USA Network, and was a crime reporter for Fox News, covering the trials of Scott Peterson, Michael Jackson, and Dennis Rader for The O'Reilly Factor and Geraldo At Large.

== Early life ==
Jones was born in Chicago, Illinois, to United States Navy Captain Ashton Blair Jones Jr. and his Greek wife Maria Kalloumenous, a native of Patras, Peloponnese. She has a sister named Janet.

== Career and education ==
While attending UCLA, Jones appeared in two episodes of Match Game '78. During the first episode she mentioned that her grandmother was also named Aphrodite. After graduating, Jones worked as a celebrity beat reporter for United Features Syndicate.

In 1992, Jones was teaching English at Cumberland College in Williamsburg, Kentucky when she published her first book, The FBI Killer, about Mark Putnam, the first active FBI agent convicted of homicide. The book was the source material for the 1994 made-for-television film Betrayed by Love, starring Patricia Arquette and Steven Weber.

Jones' second book, Cruel Sacrifice, chronicled the 1992 murder of Indiana teenager Shanda Sharer by four other teen-aged girls. The book's subject matter cost Jones her job at Cumberland College, a conservative Baptist institution. Cruel Sacrifice was on The New York Times Best Seller List for three months in 1994.

In 1996, Jones published the groundbreaking book, All She Wanted, now entitled All He Wanted, based on one of the first transgender hate crimes in America. The book was initially meant to provide the source material for the Academy Award-winning film Boys Don't Cry, starring Hilary Swank, but the film was rewritten extensively, prompting Jones to file a lawsuit against its distributor, Fox Searchlight Pictures.

Jones has written a total of nine books, among them A Perfect Husband, about the murder case against Michael Peterson, now infamous to viewers of the Netflix series, The Staircase.

== True Crime with Aphrodite Jones ==
Jones hosted and executive produced the documentary television series True Crime with Aphrodite Jones, which aired in first run on the Investigation Discovery channel from 2010 to 2016.

== Personal life ==
As of 2016, Jones resides in South Florida.

== Books ==
- The FBI Killer (1992) – about the murder of Susan Smith
- Cruel Sacrifice (1994) — about the murder of Shanda Sharer
- All She Wanted (1996) — about the hate crime committed against a transgender boy, Brandon Teena
- Della's Web (1998) — about convicted murderer Della Sutorius
- The Embrace: A True Vampire Story (1999) — about convicted murderer Rod Ferrell
- Red Zone: The Behind-the-Scenes Story of the San Francisco Dog Mauling (2003) – about the dog attack that killed Diane Whipple
- — (Aug 1, 2004). A Perfect Husband. Pinnacle Books. ISBN 978-0786016945. – about the 2003 Michael Peterson trial
- Michael Jackson Conspiracy (2007) — about the 2005 Michael Jackson child molestation trial
- Levi’s Eyes (2023) — about Karl Karlsen's murders for insurance fraud
