= Lou (2022 film) =

American crime thriller film by Anna Foerster

- Netflix promotional poster
- Directed by: Anna Foerster
- Written by: Maggie Cohn; Jack Stanley
- Produced by: J. J. Abrams; Jon Cohen; Hannah Minghella
- Starring: Allison Janney; Jurnee Smollett; Logan Marshall-Green; Ridley Asha Bateman; Matt Craven
- Cinematography: Michael McDonough
- Edited by: Matt Evans; Paul Tothill
- Music by: Nima Fakhrara
- Production company: Bad Robot
- Distributed by: Netflix
- Release date: September 23, 2022
- Running time: 109 minutes
- Country: United States
- Language: English

Lou is a 2022 American crime thriller film directed by Anna Foerster. The film stars Allison Janney, Jurnee Smollett, Logan Marshall-Green, Ridley Asha Bateman, and Matt Craven.

As a massive storm rages on a remote Washington island, a young girl is kidnapped. Her mother Hannah works with her reclusive, next-door neighbor Lou to follow the kidnapper, and along the way they face many challenges and long-kept secrets are revealed.

Lou was released on September 23, 2022, by Netflix. The film received mixed reviews from critics, who praised Janney's performance but criticized the writing.

== Plot ==
In 1986, on Orcas Island in Washington, Lou is a loner living with her dog Jax, who goes to the village to buy some supplies. The sheriff talks to her about a copper bracelet that could help her arthritis, as it helped him.

A mother, Hannah, plays hide-and-seek with her young daughter Vee outside their home. Her neighbour and landlord Lou stops by on her way back home to remind her rent is due the next day.

A large storm is predicted so Hannah's male friend Chris offers to buy supplies. It begins to rain as Chris heads home in his van. He picks up a hitchhiker who kills him. The hitchhiker then cuts power to Hannah's home. While she is outside trying to restore it, he kidnaps Vee and flees with her on foot.

Hannah runs to Lou's house, interrupting her suicide attempt, and tells her that Vee is missing. Before they can leave, Lou's truck blows up from a bomb set by the hitchhiker. Eventually, Hannah and Lou set off tracking him and Vee into the night during the storm.

Hannah informs Lou that the hitchhiker is Vee's father Philip, a former Green Beret and war criminal she thought was dead. Lou finds and kills Philip's friends on the way, clearly showing she is more than she appears to be. She explains to Hannah that she spent 26 years as a CIA field agent.

Lou and Hannah track Philip and Vee to the beach at Eagle Bay. Lou sends Hannah to radio for help, while she goes to confront Philip and rescue Vee. After a standoff, it is revealed Philip is actually Lou's son, who tracked them down after she turned him in while hiding Hannah and Vee to protect them. It is also revealed that Lou abandoned him as a child to avoid blowing her undercover mission in Iran. Philip injures Lou and leaves with Vee, intending to kill all of them together.

Hannah contacts the sheriff, but a call from the United States Marshals Service forces him to stand down, as it is now a federal case. The sheriff goes to Eagle Bay nonetheless, where he finds Lou and gives her a copper bracelet. Meanwhile, Hannah arrives at the lighthouse and manages to get Vee away from Philip. After a scuffle, Hannah injures Philip and flees with Vee.

Lou finds the lighthouse filled with explosives and sets them off from a distance, destroying it to signal an approaching CIA helicopter. Lou and Philip fight on the beach, until she gains the upper hand and hugs him. She apologizes as a CIA agent fires on them, and both Lou and Philip go under the water's surface.

Later, Hannah and Vee are shown in Lou's house, packed up and ready to leave. After a few questions from CIA agents and a goodbye from the sheriff, they are seen on board a ferry with Jax, who looks at someone on the upper deck, not fully in frame. The camera shifts to show a woman's arm with a similar scar as Lou's and a copper bracelet, as she watches Hannah and Vee through binoculars.

== Cast ==
- Allison Janney as Lou Adell
- Jurnee Smollett as Hannah Dawson
- Logan Marshall-Green as Philip
- Ridley Asha Bateman as Vee Dawson
- Matt Craven as Sheriff Rankin
- Greyston Holt as Chris
- Daniel Bernhardt as Tony
- RJ Fetherstonhaugh as Gerry

== Production ==
=== Filming ===
Production was originally set to begin in Vancouver, Canada from May to July 2020 with Paramount Pictures but the rights to the film were later acquired by the American independent film company Bad Robot, in conjunction with Netflix, who began production in June 2021 and wrapped in August that same year.

=== Casting ===
Allison Janney was cast in 2019. On April 28, 2021, Jurnee Smollett signed on as one of the leading roles alongside Janney. They both served as executive producers.

== Release ==
The film was released on Netflix on September 23, 2022.

== Reception ==
On the review aggregator website Rotten Tomatoes, 67% of 52 critics' reviews are positive, with an average rating of 6.1/10. The website's consensus reads: "From a storyline or set piece perspective, Lou doesn't add much to the action genre -- but it does serve as a generally entertaining reminder that Allison Janney is not to be trifled with." On Metacritic, the film has a weighted average score of 51 out of 100 based on 12 critics, indicating "mixed or average" reviews. Jeannette Catsoulis reviewed the film for The New York Times, saying, "Unfazed either by the working conditions or by Maggie Cohn and Jack Stanley's ridiculously over-the-top screenplay, [Janney] lends her grouchy character more than a ramrod spine and steely stare." In another positive review for the Los Angeles Times, Noel Murray writes, "The mystery of who Lou is and why she takes an interest in Hannah isn't as surprising as the movie makes it out to be; but Janney is so commanding as an unlikely action hero that the picture still works." John Anderson of The Wall Street Journal said, "Sometimes you just want a crazy action movie to kill an evening, and "Lou" fits that bill. Just don’t expect to be thinking about it tomorrow." Lou was also praised by IGN's Tara Bennett who called it "a tight, gripping thriller that opens up a whole new genre for the ever-fabulous Allison Janney."

In a negative review, Brian Tallerico of RogerEbert.com writes, "Allison Janney proves with Lou that she could carry an action movie. If only she got one worth carrying." In another negative review, Benjamin Lee of The Guardian awarded the film with two stars out of five, criticizing the plot of Lou, calling its twist as "dull [and] derailing that complicates and confuses, turning what could have been a tight little chase movie into something far baggier and far harder to get involved in."
