= Maggie Cohn =

American screenwriter

Maggie Cohn is an American screenwriter. She is known for writing Lou, Narcos: Mexico, American Crime Story and The Staircase.

== Career ==
Cohn attended Vassar College in 2003.

Cohn was nominated for a Writers Guild of America Award in 2023 for The Staircase. She previously won the award in 2019 for American Crime Story. She also won a Producers Guild of America Award for American Crime Story.

A television limited series called The Challenger was being written by Cohn, based on the 2023 Meredith Bagby book, The New Guys: The Historic Class of Astronauts That Broke Barriers and Changed the Face of Space Travel about the Space Shuttle Challenger, starring Kristen Stewart. In March 2026, it was reported that Amazon Prime Video has ordered the series.

== Personal life ==
Cohn has been in a relationship with Colin Firth since 2022. They met on the set of the drama series, The Staircase.
