= Brenton Butler case =

Murder case in Jacksonville, Florida

- Court: Duval County Courthouse
- Full case name: State of Florida v. Brenton Leonard Butler
- Decided: November 21, 2000; 25 years ago
- Verdict: Not guilty on both counts

Court membership
- Judge sitting: Waddell Wallace

The Brenton Butler case (officially State of Florida v. Brenton Leonard Butler) was a murder case in Jacksonville, Florida, United States. During the investigation of a shooting death outside a motel in 2000, police arrested 15-year-old Brenton Butler and charged him with the murder. After police interrogation, Butler confessed to the crime, and the case went to trial. However, during the trial he testified that he had been physically coerced into his confession, and deprived for hours to rights to counsel and a parent. No physical evidence tied him to the case. He was acquitted.

The case gained significant notice in the media. French director Jean-Xavier de Lestrade made a documentary, Murder on a Sunday Morning (2001), about the case. He won an Oscar for Best Documentary Feature in 2002.

== Case ==
In May 2000, a married couple from Georgia were accosted outside the Ramada Inn on University Boulevard. Mary Ann Stephens was fatally shot in the head in front of her husband, and the killer fled. During the subsequent investigation, police picked up Butler, a 15-year-old student at Englewood High School who was on his way to submit a job application to a local Blockbuster Video.

Butler was brought to the victim's husband, who identified him as the killer. But the youth differed from the physical description of the shooter that the husband gave to the police, other than being black. Police brought Butler in for questioning, and he allegedly confessed to the murder, both orally and in writing, in front of at least two detectives. State Attorney Harry Shorstein decided to prosecute the case.

During the trial, however, Butler testified that two detectives involved in the investigation, including Michael Glover, son of Sheriff Nat Glover, had intimidated and physically abused him into confessing.

Butler was represented by Patrick McGuinness and Ann Finnell, two attorneys from the public defenders office. They supplied a photograph of Butler with bruises on his face, which they claimed was the result of the interrogation. The jury deliberated for less than an hour before finding Butler not guilty. One juror later cited the testimony about the interrogation as one of the key factors in their decision.

State Attorney Shorstein and Jacksonville Sheriff Glover took the unusual steps of apologizing to Butler. They re-opened the case, investigating two additional and unrelated suspects.

Michael Glover denied the allegations against him, and Shorstein said there was no evidence that Butler had been physically abused during the interrogation.

== Legacy ==
After the case, the State Attorney's Office launched a grand jury investigation into the conduct of the officers and prosecutors, while the Jacksonville Sheriff's Office began an internal affairs investigation. The grand jury investigation criticized the prosecutor and police for their handling of the case but found no evidence of criminal wrongdoing. The police disciplinary board sought the suspension of three officers and other penalties for two more, but these measures were later largely overturned.

Michael Glover retired from JSO and became a private investigator. Dwayne Darnell was transferred from the homicide division.

The Butler case opened up discussion about the video taping of police interrogations. At the time of the investigation, the Jacksonville Sheriff's Office was in discussions over implementing video recording during interrogations. The office had purchased the equipment and was prepared to start taping interrogations, but held off at the request of the State Attorney's Office.

After the grand jury investigation, the Sheriff's office began taping interrogations of juvenile suspects, and implemented other procedural changes recommended by the grand jury.

The Butler case was the subject of the French documentary film Murder on a Sunday Morning (2001), directed by Jean-Xavier de Lestrade. It won the Academy Award for Best Documentary Feature at the 74th Academy Awards in 2002. The documentary follows Butler's defense team as they build their case for his innocence. They noted other irregularities after Butler was arrested: although a minor, he was held for hours without being allowed to call a parent or guardian. Similarly, he was not offered the right to counsel.

In 2004, Butler wrote a book about his experience, entitled They Said It Was Murder.

== Later developments ==
After Butler's acquittal, his attorneys tipped the Sheriff's Office to two other suspects, Juan Curtis and Jermel Williams. Williams pleaded guilty to second-degree murder and testified against his co-defendant at the trial; he was sentenced to ten years in prison. Curtis' fingerprints were found on the victim's purse, which had been recovered after the crime, but had never been tested. The Butler case figured into the new trial; the judge allowed Curtis' lawyers to discuss the eye-witness identification, but ruled that Florida's evidence laws forbade them from using Butler's confession. Curtis was subsequently found guilty of first-degree murder and sentenced to life in prison. However, in 2004 appeals court found that the exclusion of the confession denied Curtis' constitutional right to a fair trial, and granted a retrial. At this second trial Curtis was found guilty and sentenced to two consecutive life terms.

== Lawsuit ==
In late February 2001, lawyers for the Butler family announced that they were moving forward with a civil lawsuit seeking $2.5 million in damages against the City, the Sheriff's Department and individual officers involved. Eight months later, the lawsuit was refiled, seeking $8.5 million. Finally, on April 29, 2002, the Butler family accepted a $775,000 settlement from the city. According to their attorney, the family decided to settle for various reasons, including concerns about how long the case would drag on and the difficulty in proving the case under federal civil rights law.
