= Murder of Kiplyn Davis =

Utah teen believed murdered in 1995

Kiplyn Davis
- Born: July 1, 1979; Provo, Utah, U.S.
- Died: c. May 2, 1995 (aged 15); Spanish Fork, Utah, U.S.
- Education: Spanish Fork High School
- Parents: Richard Davis (father); Tamara Davis (mother)
- Relatives: Karissa Lords (sister) (b. 1986)

Kiplyn Davis (July 1, 1979 – May 2, 1995) was a 15-year-old high school student who disappeared from her high school campus in Spanish Fork, Utah. She is one of the featured children on the Polly Klaas Foundation website. In 2011, a classmate was convicted of manslaughter in the murder of Davis and sentenced to 15 years in prison. However, the man refused to name his alleged accomplices or indicate where Davis's remains were supposedly concealed.

== Disappearance ==
Davis, a sophomore, was last seen at Spanish Fork High School in Spanish Fork, Utah. That morning she had an argument with her parents then arrived early to school. She subsequently attended all of her morning classes and was last seen at lunchtime in the school's cafeteria with her friends and classmates. She did not show up for her fourth and fifth period classes. However, one close friend said he spoke with her between fourth and fifth period but later changed his story. All of her personal belongings, including her purse, makeup, dental retainer and schoolbooks, were left in her locker at school and she never returned home for the day. It has been testified that she told friends that she would not be attending activities planned that evening, and in fact, had mentioned it would be better if she ran away. She was reported missing after failing to arrive home at her usual time after school. Within two months, the FBI became involved and treated the case as a possible kidnapping.

After months passed without Davis' return or any clues as to her whereabouts, police began to suspect foul play in her disappearance. Although she had an argument with her parents the day of her disappearance and mentioned running away, her family believes she was murdered. After her disappearance there were various rumors that her body was buried either in a nearby canyon, a train tunnel, under a building, and various other locations, but her remains have never been located. Four years after her disappearance, her family held a memorial service for Davis and put up a marker in her name at the Spanish Fork City Cemetery.

== Investigation ==
External image
- Age progression of Davis to age 30

In 2003, U.S. Attorney Paul Warner revived the probe into Davis's death. The investigation focused on several of Davis's classmates who were suspects or were believed to have knowledge of her disappearance: Timmy Brent Olsen, Christopher Neal Jeppson, Rucker Leifson, Gary Blackmore and Scott Brunson.

Olson and Leifson were charged with her murder. Olsen came under suspicion soon after Davis's disappearance. During several interviews with law enforcement, he gave dramatically different accounts of when he had last seen Davis and gave two different alibis for his whereabouts at the time of her disappearance. Several witnesses also swore statements claiming Olsen had confessed to sexually assaulting and killing Davis, then hiding her body in a canyon near the Spanish Fork River. During the investigation, at least four women testified Olsen was sexually aggressive or committed sexual assault against them.

On May 6, 2009, the Utah State prosecutors dropped the murder charges against Christopher Neal Jeppson instead of seeking the death penalty. In court he pled no contest to obstruction related charges and ultimately signed an affidavit stating that he does not know the circumstances or cause of Kiplyn Davis's disappearance.

Rucker Leifson pleaded guilty to one count of lying to a grand jury and was sentenced to four years in prison. Gary Blackmore and Scott Brunson have also been found guilty of lying to a grand jury. Their sentences hinge upon their testimony against Olsen.

On June 1, 2009, news of a decision by the judge on a motion to dismiss the murder charge against Olsen was announced. The judge decided to defer any ruling on the motion in the case, stating he had not heard all the evidence from the prosecutors. The court may still call for evidentiary hearing to establish whether there is evidence of death.

On February 11, 2011, Timmy Brent Olsen pleaded guilty to manslaughter and was sentenced to 15 years in prison. He claimed he saw another individual hit Davis in the head with a rock and subsequently helped move her body, but declined to name the other individual. Although he admitted that he helped move and bury the body, he refuses to tell authorities where the body is located. Olsen was eligible for parole in 2021, but parole was denied after he refused to cooperate in disclosing the location of Davis's remains. He was ordered to serve his entire sentence and was released in February, 2026.

== In popular culture ==
The crime documentary series Nightmare Next Door released an episode about Kiplyn's disappearance, subtitled Stealing Beauty (season 8, episode 1, air date: January 24, 2014).

== See also ==
- List of solved missing person cases: 1990s
