= Michael Peterson trial =

2003 American murder trial

State v. Peterson
- Court: Superior Court of North Carolina
- Full case name: State of North Carolina v. Michael Iver Peterson
- Started: July 1, 2003
- Decided: October 10, 2003
- Verdict: Guilty of murder of Kathleen Peterson
- Charge: Life imprisonment

Case history
- Appealed to: North Carolina Court of Appeals – rejected on September 19, 2006; North Carolina Supreme Court – affirmed appeal on November 9, 2007
- Subsequent actions: Motion for new trial denied by Durham County Superior Court on March 10, 2009; New trial granted on December 16, 2011; Entered Alford plea on February 24, 2017, sentenced to 86 months with credit for time served

Court membership
- Judge sitting: Orlando Hudson

Michael Iver Peterson (born October 23, 1943) is an American novelist who was convicted in 2003 of murdering his second wife, Kathleen Peterson, on December 9, 2001. In 2011, after eight years in prison, Peterson was released from prison after being granted a new trial. In a review of an appeal, the judge had ruled that a critical prosecution witness in the first trial gave misleading testimony. Peterson was out on bail and under house arrest while awaiting a new trial.

In 2017, Peterson submitted an Alford plea to the reduced charge of voluntary manslaughter. He was sentenced to time already served and freed.

Peterson's case attracted the attention of a French documentary team interested in American justice. Soon after his arrest, Peterson gave them access, including interviews with him and his family, the defense attorney, and others. The team had originally planned a film but, given the complexity of the material, expanded their work into a documentary miniseries The Staircase (2004), which aired on French TV.

The team started filming soon after Peterson's arrest in 2001, and followed the case through the trial and imprisonment. They continued filming through his appeal and Peterson's eventual Alford plea in 2017. After that they released a sequel to their first work that explored the following years.

In 2019, Peterson wrote an account of his life since his wife's death. His independently published memoir is titled Behind the Staircase.

An American dramatic miniseries was made, also titled The Staircase (2022). Starring Colin Firth and Toni Collette, it covers the case and its aftermath, including the presence of the documentary team.

Additional documentaries have been produced about Kathleen's death, and podcasts, radio shows, and other media also have been created.

== Personal and professional life ==
Michael Iver Peterson was born near Nashville, Tennessee, the son of Eugene Iver Peterson and Eleanor Peterson (née Bartolino). He graduated from Duke University with a bachelor's degree in political science. While there, Peterson joined Sigma Nu fraternity and served as president. He also was editor of The Chronicle, the daily student newspaper, from 1964 to 1965. He attended classes at the law school of the University of North Carolina at Chapel Hill.

After graduating, Peterson took a civilian job with the United States Department of Defense. Assigned to a base in Germany, he researched arguments supporting increased military involvement in Vietnam. There he met and married Patricia Sue (Patty), a young American who taught at an elementary school on the Rhein-Main Air Base in Gräfenhausen, West Germany. They had two sons, Clayton and Todd.

In 1968, Peterson was commissioned in the United States Marine Corps and served in the Vietnam War. In 1971, he received an honorable discharge with the rank of captain after a car crash in Japan, where he was serving as an MPO, left him with a permanent disability.

Years later, during his candidacy for the 1999 Durham mayoral election, Peterson claimed he had been awarded a Silver Star, a Bronze Star with Valor, and two Purple Hearts. He had all the medals but said he did not have the documentation for them. Peterson claimed he had received one Purple Heart after being hit by shrapnel when another soldier stepped on a land mine and the other when he was shot. He later admitted his war injury was not the result of the shrapnel wound in Vietnam but was the result of a car accident in Japan, where he was stationed after the war as a military police officer. The News & Observer said records did not contain any mention of the two Purple Hearts that Peterson said he had received.

Peterson and Patricia lived in Germany for some time. There they befriended neighbors Elizabeth and George Ratliff and their two young daughters, Margaret and Martha. George died young, and the Peterson and Ratliff families became very close. When the widowed Elizabeth Ratliff died in 1985, Michael became the guardian of her two children.

Michael and Patricia divorced in 1987. Clayton and Todd lived with their mother Patricia, and they stayed in Germany.

Michael took the girls with him back to the United States, where he settled in Durham, North Carolina. Clayton and Todd later also joined their father in the US.

In 1989, Michael moved with his four children to live with Kathleen Atwater, a successful Nortel business executive. She had a daughter Caitlin from her first marriage. During her years with Peterson, Kathleen was the chief financial support of the family.

When the couple married in 1997, Kathleen's daughter Caitlin became the fifth sibling in the blended family. (She had been living with her father part time before that.)

Peterson wrote three novels based "around his experiences during the Vietnamese conflict": The Immortal Dragon, A Time of War, and A Bitter Peace. He co-wrote the biographical Charlie Two Shoes and the Marines of Love Company with journalist David Perlmutt and co-wrote Operation Broken Reed with Arthur L. Boyd.

Peterson also worked as a newspaper columnist for The Herald-Sun, where his columns became known for their criticism of police and of Durham County district attorney James Hardin Jr. Still serving as DA in 2001, Hardin led the prosecution of Peterson for the murder of his second wife, Kathleen.

== Murder trial ==
=== Kathleen's death ===
On December 9, 2001, Peterson called emergency services on 911, to report that he had just found Kathleen Peterson unconscious in their Forest Hills neighborhood home in Durham, North Carolina, and suspected she had fallen down "fifteen to twenty, I don't know" steps. He later claimed that he had been outside by the pool and had come in at 2:40 am to find Kathleen severely injured and lying at the foot of the stairs. Peterson said she must have fallen down the stairs after consuming alcohol and Valium.

Toxicology results showed that Kathleen's blood alcohol content was 0.07 percent (70 mg/100mL), her alcohol in urine was 0.11, and she had taken between 5 and 15 mg of Valium. The autopsy report concluded that the 48-year-old woman sustained a matrix of severe injuries, including a fracture of the superior cornu of the left thyroid cartilage and seven lacerations to the top and back of her head, consistent with blows from a blunt object. She had died from blood loss ninety minutes to two hours after sustaining the injuries.

Kathleen's daughter, Caitlin, and Kathleen's sister, Candace Zamperini, both initially proclaimed Michael's innocence and publicly supported him alongside his sons and adopted daughters. Zamperini reconsidered after learning of Michael's bisexuality, as she did not believe Kathleen would have tolerated it. Caitlin read her mother's autopsy report and saw the photos before the trial; horrified, she became estranged from Peterson. Both subsequently broke off from the rest of the family.

Although forensic expert Henry Lee, hired by Peterson's defense, testified that the blood-spatter evidence was consistent with an accidental fall down the stairs, police investigators concluded that the injuries were inconsistent with such an accident. As Peterson was the only person at the residence at the time of Kathleen's death, he was the prime suspect and was soon charged with her murder. He pleaded not guilty.

The medical examiner, Deborah Radisch, concluded that Kathleen had died from lacerations of the scalp caused by a homicidal assault. According to Radisch, the total of seven lacerations to the top and back of Kathleen's head were the result of repeated blows with a light, yet rigid, weapon. The defense disputed this theory. According to their analysis, the lacerations were not consistent with blows of any sort, because there was a lack of underlying injury, such as skull fractures or bruising, swelling, and hemorrhaging of the brain.

The trial drew increasing media attention as details of Peterson's private life emerged. Hardin and his prosecution team (among them Mike Nifong) attacked Peterson's credibility, focusing on his misleading statements during his political campaign about his military awards, which were not supported by records. They also described his years as a closeted gay man who had numerous brief liaisons with men and kept them secret from family and friends. The prosecution contended that the Petersons' marriage was far from happy, suggesting that Kathleen had discovered Michael's allegedly secret gay life and was so infuriated that she wanted to end their marriage. It was the main motive that the prosecution offered at trial for Kathleen's alleged murder (the other being a $1.5 million life insurance policy). According to Assistant District Attorney Freda Black, Kathleen:

"would have been infuriated by learning that her husband, who she truly loved, was bi-sexual and having an extramarital relationship—not with another woman—but a man, which would have been humiliating and embarrassing to her. We believe that once she learned this information that an argument ensued and a homicide occurred."

The defense argued that Kathleen accepted Michael's bisexuality and that the marriage was very happy, a position supported by Michael and Kathleen's children and other friends and associates.

The prosecution said that Kathleen's murder was most likely committed with a custom-made fireplace poker called a blow poke. It had been a gift to the Petersons from Kathleen's sister Candace but was missing from the house at the time of the investigation. Later in the trial, the defense team produced the missing blow poke, which they said had been found in the garage. A juror contacted after the trial noted that the jury had dismissed the idea of the blow poke as the murder weapon.

=== Elizabeth's death ===
Elizabeth Ratliff, a friend of the Petersons and mother of Margie and Martha, had died in Germany in 1985. In what appeared to have been an accident and Peterson said was caused by a brain aneurysm, she had been found dead at the foot of her staircase with injuries to the head. Her death had been investigated by both the German police and U.S. military police. An autopsy at the time of her death concluded Ratliff died from an intra-cerebral hemorrhage secondary to the blood coagulation disorder Von Willebrand's disease. This was based on blood in her cerebrospinal fluid and reports that she had been suffering severe, persistent headaches in the weeks leading up to her death. The coroner determined that the hemorrhage resulted in immediate death, followed by Ratliff falling down the stairs after collapsing.

Patty and Michael Peterson had had dinner with Ratliff and her young daughters that night. Peterson had stayed and helped Ratliff put the girls to bed before going home. The children's nanny, Barbara, discovered Ratliff's body when she arrived the next morning. Peterson was the last known person to see Elizabeth alive.

When the prosecution investigation found similarities between the deaths of the two women (head injuries after a fall down a staircase), they wanted further information. The Durham court ordered the exhumation of Ratliff's embalmed body in order to reexamine the cause of death. Arrangements were made for the Durham medical examiner, who had initially performed Kathleen's autopsy, to perform this reevaluation, over the objections of defense counsel who argued that the autopsy should be performed by Texas medical examiners. The body was transported from Texas to Durham. The Durham M.E. found sufficient evidence drawn from the results of the second autopsy, along with new witness statements describing the scene, to overturn the earlier findings and list Ratliff's cause of death as "homicide".

The prosecution declined to accuse Peterson of Ratliff's death but introduced the death into the trial as an incident from which Peterson got the idea of how to "fake" Kathleen's accident. Despite police reports that there was very little blood at the scene of Ratliff's death, the nanny, who was the first to discover Ratliff's body in 1985, took the stand at Peterson's trial and testified that there was a large amount of blood at the scene. Another witness testified to spending much of the day cleaning blood stains off the wall. Doubt as to the admissibility of the Ratliff evidence in court was one of the grounds for the subsequent appeal of the conviction filed by Peterson's lawyers in 2005.

In October 2002, acting as administrator of Kathleen's estate, Caitlin filed a wrongful death claim against Peterson. In June 2006, Peterson filed for bankruptcy. Two weeks later, Caitlin filed an objection to the bankruptcy. On February 1, 2007, Caitlin and Peterson settled the wrongful death claim for $25 million, pending acceptance by the courts involved; finalization of the settlement by the court was announced on February 1, 2008.

=== Verdict ===
On October 10, 2003, after one of the longest trials in North Carolina history, a Durham County jury found Peterson guilty of the murder of Kathleen. He was sentenced to life in prison without the possibility of parole (LWOP). Denial of parole requires premeditation.

Despite the jury accepting the murder as a "spur-of-the-moment" crime, they also found it was premeditated. As one juror explained it, premeditated meant not only planning hours or days ahead but could also mean planning in the seconds before committing a spur-of-the-moment crime.

Peterson was housed at the Nash Correctional Institution near Rocky Mount until he was released on December 16, 2011. While awaiting a new trial, he was ordered to be under electronic house arrest.

=== Appeal ===
Peterson's appeal was filed by his defense counsel, with Thomas Maher serving as his court-appointed attorney. It was argued before the North Carolina Court of Appeals on April 18, 2006. On September 19, the Court of Appeals rejected Peterson's arguments that he did not get a fair trial because of repeated judicial mistakes. The Appeals' ruling said the evidence was fairly admitted. The judges did find defects in a search warrant, but said they had no ill effect on the defense. Because the ruling was not unanimous, under North Carolina law, Peterson had the right to appeal to the North Carolina Supreme Court, which accepted the case. An oral argument was heard on September 10, 2007. On November 9, 2007, the Court announced that it affirmed the decision of the appeals. Absent a reconsideration of the ruling or the raising of a federal issue, Peterson had exhausted his appeals of the verdict.

On November 12, 2008, attorneys J. Burkhardt Beale and Jason Anthony of Richmond, Virginia, who were then representing Peterson, filed a motion for a new trial in Durham County court on three grounds: that the prosecution withheld exculpatory evidence about the blow poke, that the prosecution used an expert witness whose qualifications were disputed, and that one juror based his judgment on racial factors. On March 10, 2009, Peterson's motion was denied by the Durham County Superior Court.

=== Owl theory ===
In late 2003, a new theory of Kathleen's death was raised: that she had been attacked by a barred owl outside the house, had fallen after rushing inside, and had been knocked unconscious after hitting her head on the first tread of the stairs. The owl theory was raised by Durham attorney T. Lawrence Pollard, a neighbor of the Petersons who was not involved in the case but had been following the public details. He approached the police suggesting an owl might have been responsible after viewing the autopsy photographs of Kathleen's head wounds. Later, when reading the North Carolina State Bureau of Investigation (SBI) evidence list, he found a feather listed as found in Kathleen's hair (despite having previously been informed by the District Attorney's office that no feathers had been found during the investigation). The SBI crime lab report listed a microscopic feather and a wooden sliver from a tree limb entangled in a clump of hair that had been pulled out by the roots found clutched in Kathleen's left hand. A re-examination of the hair in September 2008 found another microscopic feather.

According to Pollard, had a jury been presented with this evidence it would have "materially affected their deliberation and therefore would have materially affected their ultimate verdict". Prosecutors have ridiculed the claim. Deborah Radisch, the pathologist who conducted Kathleen's autopsy, says it was unlikely that an owl or any other bird could have made wounds as deep as those on her scalp. However, Radisch's opinion was challenged by other experts in three separate affidavits filed in 2010.

Despite interest in this theory among some outside advocates, no motion for a new trial was filed on this point in 2009. On March 2, 2017 (following his Alford plea), Peterson's attorney filed a motion to allow him to pay for a bird expert at the Smithsonian Institution to examine feather fragments found in Kathleen's hair to determine whether or not she had been attacked by an owl. In 2023, Pollard endorsed the theory presented in the book Death by Talons by Tiddy Smith, which posits that a bird attack was not restricted to the outside path, but continued inside the Petersons' house.

=== Retrial hearing ===
In August 2010, following a series of newspaper articles critical of the SBI, North Carolina Attorney General Roy Cooper led an investigation that resulted in the suspension of SBI analyst Duane Deaver, one of the principal witnesses against Peterson. The investigative report found that his work was among the worst done on scores of flawed criminal cases. Pollard subsequently filed affidavits (Note: Neurosurgeon and owl expert Alan van Norman; Patrick T. Redig, a professor of veterinary medicine at the University of Minnesota; and Kate P. Davis, the director of Raptors of the Rockies, signed affidavits claiming that the evidence and injuries are consistent with an attack by an owl, possibly a barred owl.) to support a motion that Superior Court Judge Orlando Hudson order the state Medical Examiner's Office to turn over all documentation related to Kathleen's autopsy to Peterson's attorneys. However, Judge Hudson barred Pollard from filing further motions on behalf of Peterson because he did not represent him.

A new motion was filed in August 2010 by David Rudolf, one of Peterson's original attorneys, who acted pro bono in proceedings challenging the SBI testimony.

Deaver was fired from the SBI in January 2011, after an independent audit of the agency found he had falsely represented evidence in 34 cases, including withholding negative results in the case of Greg Taylor, a North Carolina man who spent seventeen years in prison on a murder conviction based on Deaver's testimony. A bloodstain-analysis team that Deaver had trained was suspended and disbanded. In the 2003 Peterson trial, Deaver testified that he had been mentored by SBI bloodstain specialist David Spittle, worked 500 bloodstain cases, written 200 reports, and testified in 60 cases. During the retrial hearing, SBI Assistant Director Eric Hooks testified that Deaver had written only 47 reports. Spittle testified that he could not recall mentoring Deaver, who, since completing a two-day training course in the 1980s, had testified in only four cases, the Peterson case being the third. The SBI cited the bloodstain analysis given in the fourth case as the reason for firing Deaver.

On December 16, 2011, Peterson was released from the Durham County jail on $300,000 bail and placed under house arrest with a tracking anklet. His release on bond followed a judicial order for a new trial after Judge Hudson found that Deaver had given "materially misleading" and "deliberately false" testimony about bloodstain evidence, and had exaggerated his training, experience, and expertise. Former North Carolina Attorney General Rufus L. Edmisten said that any evidence gathered after Deaver arrived at the scene might be deemed inadmissible in a new trial. In July 2014, Peterson's bond restrictions were eased.

In October 2014, the court appointed Mike Klinkosum to represent Peterson, replacing David Rudolf, who had been working pro bono on the case since Peterson's conviction was overturned. Rudolf had stated that he could no longer afford to represent Peterson without being paid. On November 14, 2016, Peterson's request for the second trial to be dismissed was refused, and a new trial was scheduled to begin on May 8, 2017. However, a news report on February 7, 2017, indicated that a resolution had been negotiated by Rudolf (once again representing Peterson) and the Durham County District Attorney.

=== Alford plea ===
On February 24, 2017, Peterson entered an Alford plea to the voluntary manslaughter of Kathleen, asserting his innocence but agreeing there was enough evidence to likely result in a guilty verdict. The judge sentenced him to a maximum of 86 months in prison, with credit for time previously served. Because Peterson had already served more time than the sentence (98.5 months), he did not face additional prison time.

== Media ==
=== Films about the case ===
The court case generated widespread interest, in part because of a televised documentary series variously named Soupçons (Suspicions), Death on the Staircase, and The Staircase, which detailed Peterson's legal and personal troubles. Eight 45-minute episodes of the documentary were assembled from more than 600 hours of footage. It was directed by French filmmaker Jean-Xavier de Lestrade and released by Maha Productions in October 2004. The documentary offers an intimate depiction of defense preparations for the trial. It also examines the role and behavior of the press as it covered aspects of the case. The filmmakers started their project within weeks of Kathleen's death and Peterson's murder indictment; jury selection took place in May 2003 with the case itself going to trial in July 2003.

Following the guilty verdict, de Lestrade interviewed the jurors to find out why they reached their verdict. (Note: The murder weapon was never identified. While his clothes were bloody from cradling his wife, Peterson had insufficient blood spattering on his clothes to support an attack. Media reports explained this by suggesting he probably changed his clothes, but investigators determined very early that he had not.) By and large, the jurors were swayed by the amount of blood Kathleen lost and the number of lacerations, which indicated to them it could not have been an accident. Henry Lee, however, had testified at the trial that the amount of blood was irrelevant, as the blood spatter indicated most of it was spattered as she coughed as the blood ran down her face from the injuries. He also suggested some of the blood could have been diluted with urine. Lee had also duplicated blood spatter from coughing for the jury by drinking ketchup and spitting it out. (Note: Forensic neuropathologist Jan Leestma testified Kathleen Peterson had likely sustained four blows to the head, not seven as the medical examiner testified. The prosecution counted avulsion wounds as multiple injuries and the medical examiner also initially counted four wounds following the autopsy.)

In November 2012, de Lestrade released a sequel, The Staircase II: The Last Chance, which premiered at the International Documentary Film Festival Amsterdam. The film documents Peterson's family and his legal team's arguments in seeking a retrial, in which they succeed.

=== Television productions about the case ===
- The Staircase (2004–2005), a French miniseries, also broadcast on Netflix and as part of the BBC Storyville series, under the title "Death on the Staircase", including a sequel, "The Staircase II: The Last Chance" (2012)
- "Murder, He Wrote" – Dominick Dunne's Power, Privilege, and Justice season 4, ep. 6 (Mar. 2004)
- "Written in Blood" – The New Detectives season 9, ep. 15 (Aug. 2004)
- "Blood on the Staircase" – American Justice season 14, ep. 13 (Sep. 2005)
- "A Novel Idea" – Forensic Files season 11, ep. 22 (Dec. 2006)
- "The Staircase Murders" (2007) – TV movie co-written by Aphrodite Jones, based on her book about the case
- "Staircase Killer" – True Crime with Aphrodite Jones season 1, ep. 3 (Mar. 2010)
- "Stairway to Hell" – The Devil You Know season 2, ep. 4 (Oct. 2011)
- "Reversal of Fortune" – Dateline NBC season 21, ep. 42 (May 2013)
- "Down the Back Staircase" – Dateline NBC season 25, ep. 27 (Apr. 2017)
- "American Murder Mystery: The Staircase" — Investigation Discovery (Apr. 2018) — three-part series
- The Staircase (2022) – HBO Max dramatization miniseries

=== Radio/podcast productions about the case ===
- Morbid (Podcast): "The Mysterious Death of Kathleen Peterson (Part 1)" (2026)
- Morbid (Podcast): "The Mysterious Death of Kathleen Peterson (Part 2)" (2026"
- Generation Why: "The Staircase" season 1, ep. 2 (2012)
- Criminal: "Animal Instincts" season 1, ep. 1 (Jan. 2014)
- My Favorite Murder: "The 100th Episode" (Dec. 2017)
- BBC Radio 5 Live: "Beyond Reasonable Doubt?" (2018)
- Real Crime Profile: eps. 140-145 (Aug.–Nov. 2018)
- And That's Why We Drink: ep. 324, "Foot Pimples and Chicken Pox Parties" (Apr. 2023)
- What the French Toast: ep. 28, "What the Staircase?? Part 1" and ep. 29, "What the Staircase?? Part 2" (Dec. 2023)
- Timesuck with Dan Cummins: ep. 456, "The Staircase Murders" (May 2025)
- De Volksjury: ep. 2, "The Staircase Murder" (Nov.2017)

=== Books about the case ===
- Fanning, Diane. Written in Blood (St Martin's Press, 2005)
- Jones, Aphrodite. A Perfect Husband (Kensington Books, 2013)
- Parker, R. J. The Staircase (Independently published, 2018)
- Smith, Tiddy Death by Talons (WildBlue Press, 2023)

== Michael Peterson's literary output ==
=== Publications ===
- — (1983). The Immortal Dragon. New American Library. ISBN 978-0451122452. LCCN 2009665719. – historical fiction about 19th-century Vietnam
- — (1990). A Time of War. Pocket Books. ISBN 978-0671683030. LCCN 89049197. – Vietnam War fiction
- — (1996). A Bitter Peace. Pocket Books. ISBN 978-0671726959. LCCN 94037559. – Vietnam War fiction; sequel to A Time of War
- —; Pearlmutt, David (1998). Charlie Two Shoes and the Marines of Love Company. Annapolis, MD: Naval Institute Press. ISBN 978-0671726959. LCCN 98030090. – biography
- — (2019). Behind the Staircase. Independently Published. ISBN 978-1-7963-0692-7. OCLC 1099660408. – Biographical memoir; mostly about Peterson's time in prison
- — (2020). Beyond the Staircase. Independently Published. ISBN 9798609976840. OCLC 1262795927. – Biographical memoir
