= Polly Klaas Foundation =

American child protection charity

- Formation: 1993
- Type: 501(c)(3) organization
- Headquarters: Houston, Texas, United States
- President: Dan Fish
- Key people: Marge Ford; Wade Schlueter; Shayna Clementz; Brent Collinson; Eddie Freyer; Michael Kerns; Harry Hollingshead; Buck Linder; Dan Mayer
- Revenue: $273,928 (2015)
- Expenses: $724,250 (2015)
- Website: www.pollyklaas.org

The Polly Klaas Foundation is a 501(c)(3) public charity organization devoted to preventing crimes against children, assisting in the recovery of missing children, and lobbying for legislative assistance. The foundation was formed October 23, 1993, to search for Polly Klaas. Its executive director is Robert De Leo. It has expanded its mission and now searches for many missing children.

The Polly Klaas Foundation also provides kits for parents to teach abduction prevention in a way that they state is not frightening for children. It distributes over 100,000 of these kits per year.

The Polly Klaas Foundation worked with Convio to send targeted letters to state and federal officials to implement Amber alerts in all 50 states.

Polly's father, Marc, is not associated with this foundation. However, her mother, Eve Nichol, serves on the board.

== History ==
The Polly Klaas Foundation was created initially to search for Polly Klaas. After two years, the executive director, Gary Kinley, resigned with no explanation, and there was an analysis of financial problems in 1996. The Polly Klaas Foundation has since recovered and has drastically increased its operating budget.

The Polly Klaas Foundation receives the majority of its donations via donated cars, through a partnership with Harvard Palmer Jr.'s Vehicle Donation Processing Center.

On November 19 1993 a 32 year old woman filed a civil suit against Polly Klaas Foundation president Bill Rhodes, claiming he had molested her over a period of 6 months 24 years ago. Rhodes was previously convicted of masturbating in front of several young girls in 1967 and acquitted of molesting 4 Santa Clara girls at knife point in 1968. He claimed his role in the foundation was to "make amends" for his past. Rhodes stepped down on November 20th. Police stated he was not a suspect in the Polly Klaas case. Rhodes died in February 8 2012.

== Children ==
The missing children featured by the Polly Klaas Foundation include:

- Jacob Wetterling
- Kiplyn Davis
- Jessica Cain
- Erica Fraysure
- Jennipher Gingery
- Kasey Shepard

=== Other people ===
- Michelle Le, nursing student. Search efforts were supported by the foundation.

== See also ==
- Megan Nicole Kanka Foundation
- Laura Recovery Center, Samantha Runnion
- Elizabeth Smart
- Dru Sjodin
- Dr. Chris Hatcher — criminal profiler
- Murder of Adam Walsh
