= Richard Allen Davis =

American murderer

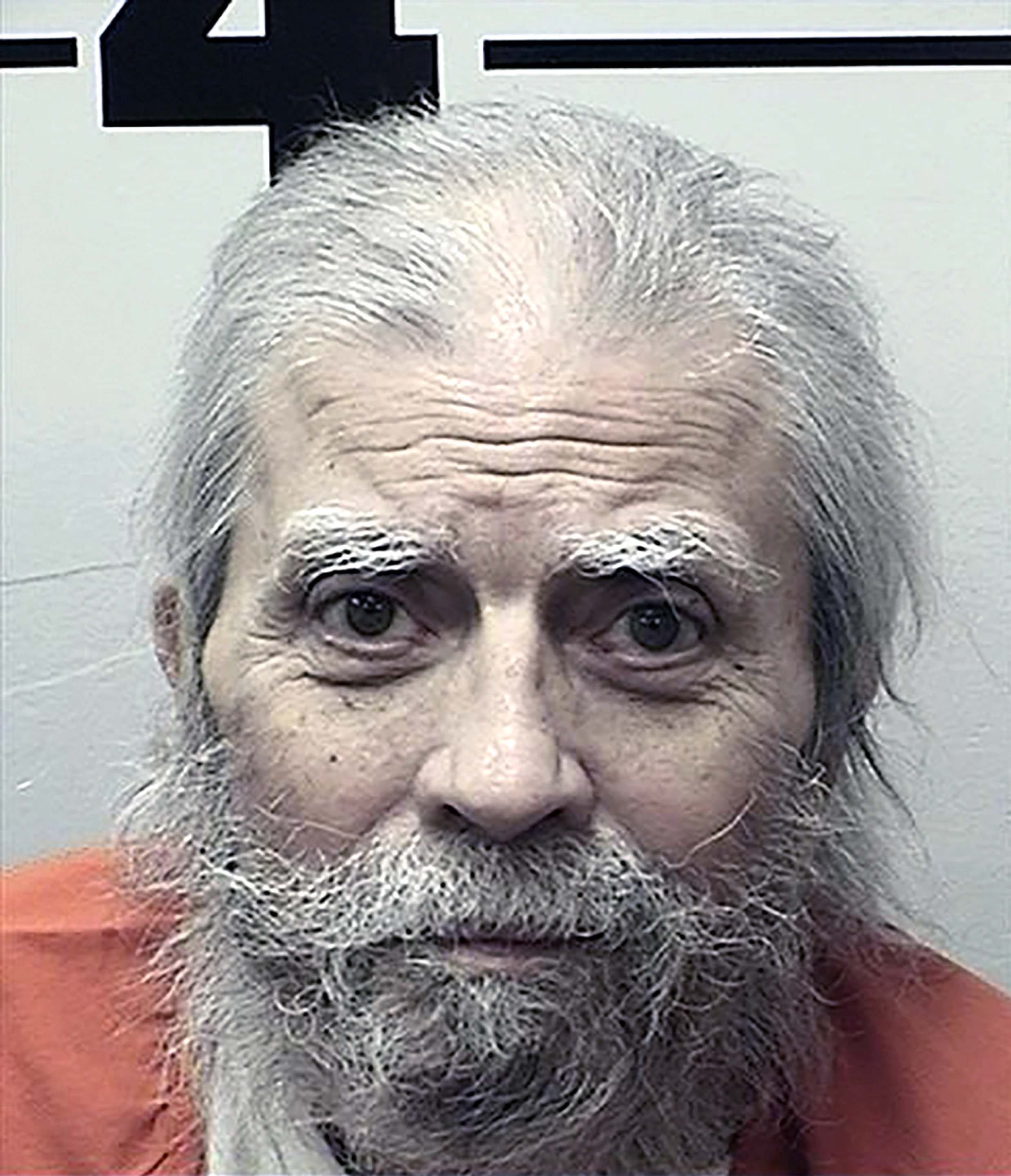
- Davis in 2023
- Born: June 2, 1954 (age 72); San Francisco, California, U.S.
- Status: On death row
- Convictions: First-degree murder with special circumstances (committed during a burglary, a robbery, a kidnapping, and the attempted commission of a lewd act upon a child under the age of 14)
- Penalty: Death

Richard Allen Davis (born June 2, 1954) is an American convicted murderer whose criminal record fueled support for the passage of California's "three-strikes law" for repeat offenders and the involuntary civil commitment act for sex offenders and predators. He was convicted in 1996 of first-degree murder with special circumstances (burglary, robbery, kidnapping, and an attempted lewd act upon a child under the age of 14) of 12-year-old Polly Klaas.

As of 2024, Davis remains imprisoned in California, following the moratorium on the death penalty in California issued by California governor Gavin Newsom in March 2019, and Davis' transfer to a state prison facility in Stockton. Newsom moved to commute his death sentence in 2026 as part of his effort to remove all death sentences in California; however, because Davis was convicted of multiple prior felonies, his commutation will require the approval of the state Supreme Court.

== Early life ==
=== Childhood ===
Davis was born to Robert Davis and Evelyn Smith in San Francisco, the third of their five children. He has two older brothers, Donald and Ronald, and two younger sisters, Darlene and Patricia (deceased). Davis is of partial Northern Paiute heritage through his maternal grandmother, Norma Wasson Johnny, with whom he and his family lived for a time before his father moved them into a house in La Honda.

His early life was disadvantaged; both parents were violent alcoholics and his mother had once punished Davis and his brothers for smoking by burning their hands on a hot stove. His father had also been described as "unloving and abusive." His mother had also held his hands to a hot stove for playing with matches when Davis was three. He witnessed many violent domestic disputes between his parents, who separated when Davis was nine, leading his mother to take him and his siblings back to their maternal grandmother.

The couple divorced when Davis was 11, and the children were given the choice of whom they would like to live with. Davis and his sisters chose their father, while his brothers chose their mother. Donald later joined his father. Robert, a longshoreman, was frequently unable or unwilling to care for his children, so he had them shuttled among family members, hired caretakers, and women he was romantically involved with. Robert was mentally unstable and suffered from hallucinations; he was reported to have taken a gun outside the home and shot at mirages. Robert would also beat Richard, breaking his jaw on one occasion and pushing him through an interior wall on another, and was known to be harsh with the others. Robert remarried twice, and Richard resented both of his stepmothers.

=== Adolescence ===
When Davis was 14, his 10-year-old sister Patricia died of an illness. By the time he entered his teens, Davis was already involved in criminal actions. When he was 12, Davis was placed on probation for burglary and forgery, and burglary again when he was 15. Davis dropped out of school in his sophomore year of high school. Davis told a psychiatrist that stealing relieved whatever "tensions" were building up inside him. At 17, when Davis was in court for a motorcycle theft, a judge told him that he could either go to the California Youth Authority or join the United States Army. Davis chose the latter and received a general discharge after 13 months of service.

On October 12, 1973, Davis went to a party at the home of 18-year-old Marlene Voris. That night, Voris was found dead of a gunshot wound. There were seven suicide notes at the scene. The police concluded that she committed suicide, although friends of Voris believe Davis murdered her. In 1977, he told a psychiatrist that her death had deeply affected him; Davis had heard her voice in his head, and, at times, another woman's voice would appear, telling him that she wanted to be assaulted, robbed, or raped.

A few weeks after Voris' death, Davis was arrested for attempting to pawn property he had stolen. Davis confessed to a string of burglaries in La Honda and served six months in the county jail. Five weeks after his release, on May 13, 1974, he was arrested for another burglary. Davis was sentenced to six months to 15 years in prison, but he was released on parole after serving a year of his sentence.

Davis has been diagnosed with avoidant personality disorder, antisocial personality disorder, and schizoid personality disorder.

=== Adult criminal history ===
Between 1975 and 1982, Davis committed crimes ranging from burglary to assault and kidnapping. Sentenced in 1985 to 16 years in State Prison, he was released on account of good behavior in June 1993.

== Murder of Polly Klaas ==
On October 1, 1993, Polly Klaas and two friends were having a slumber party at her home in Petaluma, California. Around 10:30 p.m., an intoxicated Davis entered their bedroom carrying a knife from the Klaas' kitchen. He told the girls he meant them no harm, and was only there for money. Davis tied both of Klaas' friends up, pulled pillowcases over their heads, and told them to count to 1,000. Davis then kidnapped Klaas.

An APB (all-points bulletin) with the suspect's information was broadcast within 30 minutes of the kidnapping. The broadcast, however, only went out over Sonoma County Sheriff's Channel 1.

Within hours of the kidnapping, in a rural area of Santa Rosa, about 20 miles (32 km) north of Petaluma, a babysitter on her way home noted a suspicious vehicle stuck in a ditch on her employer's private driveway. She phoned the property owner, who decided to leave with her daughter. As she drove down the long driveway to Pythian Road, the owner passed Davis. She called 911 when she got to a service station and two deputies were dispatched on the call. The deputies did not know of the kidnapping or the suspect's description, due to Sonoma Valley units being on Channel 3.

The deputies ran Davis's driver's license and license plate number, but they came back with no wants or warrants. The deputies tried to convince the property owner to perform a citizen's arrest for trespassing. Under California law, a civilian may make an arrest for this type of misdemeanor. The property owner would have had to go to the car with the deputies and say "I arrest you." The deputies then would have taken Davis into custody. The property owner refused.

The deputies called for a tow truck to get Davis' car out of the ditch. They searched it thoroughly before the arrival of the tow truck and did not find evidence of anyone else in the car. The only possible violation was an open container of beer, but Davis was not driving at the time of the deputies' contact and mere possession of an open container was not illegal. Before Davis was allowed to leave, he was instructed to pour out the beer and the deputies filled out an FI (Field Interrogation) card with his information and the FI card was filed.

On November 28, 1993, the property owner was inspecting her property after loggers had partially cleared the area of trees. She discovered items that made her think they may be related to the kidnapping. She called the sheriff's department to report her discovery, and deputies and crime scene investigators were dispatched. A torn pair of ballet leggings were found that were later matched by the FBI Crime Laboratory to the other part of the leggings which were taken as evidence on the night of the kidnapping. A review of calls in the area the day of the kidnapping turned up the contact with Davis, who had only been identified because both deputies had filled out and filed the FI card. Once the identity of Davis was revealed, his palm print at the scene of the kidnapping was also traced to him. Authorities had been unable to match the partial print earlier due to the poor quality of the print left.

The Sonoma County Sheriff's Department, in cooperation with Petaluma Police and the FBI, launched a search of the property and the Pythian Road area during a heavy rainstorm. The first two days of the search were kept as low-key as possible, since Davis was under surveillance at an Indian rancheria near Ukiah, California. When nothing was found during the initial search and the surveillance of Davis also produced no results, the decision was made to arrest him for the kidnapping of Klaas.

While Davis was being interrogated by Petaluma PD and the FBI, a massive search was launched on Friday, December 3. The Sonoma County Sheriff's Department was assisted by over 500 search team members from 24 agencies, coming from as far away as Kern County, California, and Washoe County, Nevada. The mutual aid effort was coordinated by the California State Office of Emergency Services (now known as the California Governor's Office of Emergency Services), FBI Crime Scene teams, and numerous other state and federal agencies. The search remains today as one of the largest ever conducted in California.

The search continued through Saturday, December 4. The search effort produced other items of evidence but did not produce any evidence of human remains. The search was planned to continue on Sunday, December 5, but on the evening of December 4, Davis confessed to kidnapping and murdering Klaas and led investigators to her body. He had buried her in a shallow grave just off Highway 101, about a mile south of the city limits of Cloverdale, California. The gravesite was about 20 air miles and about 30 road miles from the search site.

Although Davis admitted to strangling Klaas to death, he refused to give investigators a timeline of the events from October 1. Investigators thought he was fearful that both people who passed him would call the sheriff's department. It is believed that Davis killed Klaas before the arrival of deputies and hid her body in the thick brush on the hillside above where his car was stuck. Davis then waited for an undetermined period of time after being escorted back to Highway 12, about 1.5 miles from where his car was stuck, and drove back up to retrieve her body.

He was reportedly out of breath, sweating profusely, despite it being a cool night, and had twigs and leaves in his hair when contacted by deputies. It is also believed that Davis had chosen the gravesite in advance, since it would not have been discovered by a casual observer. The gravesite area would be directly visible from Highway 101, but not the grave itself. Davis had to drive from the Indian Rancheria in Ukiah once a week to meet with his parole officer and he would have seen any police activity in the area.

== Conviction ==
A Santa Clara County jury rendered a death verdict on August 5, 1996. After the verdict was read, Davis stood and made an obscene finger gesture at the courtroom camera with both hands. Later, at his formal sentencing, Davis read a statement during which he claimed that Polly had said to him, "Just don't do me like my dad," right before he killed her. However, no evidence supports that Polly had ever been sexually abused by her father, Marc. An enraged Marc attempted to lunge at Davis but was restrained by the bailiffs, leaving the courtroom to avoid causing further commotion.

Judge Thomas C. Hastings proceeded to formally sentence Davis to death, saying, "Mr. Davis, this is always a traumatic and emotional decision for a judge. You made it very easy today by your conduct." In July 2006, Davis was found unconscious in his cell following an opiate overdose, but was resuscitated.

=== Appeal ===
On June 1, 2009, the California Supreme Court upheld Davis' death sentence. He had argued that his jailhouse confession was inadmissible because it was given without an attorney present. The court ruled this was justified by the public safety exception to Miranda v. Arizona. His lawyer, Phillip Cherney, told reporters he intended to ask for a rehearing and that he would be lodging a habeas corpus appeal with state and federal courts.

As of 2024, Davis remains imprisoned in California. His execution has yet to be set in accordance with the moratorium on capital punishment issued by California governor Gavin Newsom on March 13, 2019, California Governor Gavin Newsom issued a moratorium for all 737 prisoners on death row in California. Newsom subsequently ordered the dismantling of San Quentin State Prison's death row, and Davis was transferred to a state prison facility in Stockton.

On 5 November 2026, Governor Newsom commuted the sentence of every prisoner on California's death row to life without parole, including Davis. This decision was supported by Polly Klaas's sisters but was condemned by her father, who felt Davis deserved to be executed. Davis is one of 382 death row prisoners whose new sentence must be approved by the Supreme Court of California due to his prior felony convictions.

== Aftermath ==
The all-points bulletin was broadcast on the CHP (California Highway Patrol) channel, which only CHP radios could receive. CHP practice changed after the case. The radio system was upgraded and such bulletins are now broadcast on all police channels through a centralized 911 dispatch system.

In the wake of the murder, politicians in California and other U.S. states supported three strikes laws and California's Three Strikes act was signed into law on March 8, 1994.

== Media ==
Investigation Discovery re-enacted the kidnapping and murder in Motives & Murder: Cracking the Case: Who Took Polly Klaas? (Season 4 Episode 4, 10/22/2014).

The A&E television series American Justice released the episode "Free to Kill: The Polly Klaas Murder". The episode exposes the challenges of the penal system to rehabilitate inmates. Davis had been in and out of jail, his convictions ranging from kidnapping to burglary. The episode originally aired October 23, 1996.

The Discovery Channel crime series The FBI Files' first episode's topic was the Polly Klaas case. The episode reveals the details of the FBI agents' collection of evidence and their hunt for the criminal, and originally aired October 20, 1998.

On May 9, 2022, Crime Junkie released an episode on Polly Klaas and discussed how the case set a precedent for California's Three Strikes law.

ABC aired an episode of 20/20 centered on the Polly Klaas case called Taken In The Night on September 22, 2023.
