= Murder of Susan Smith =

1989 murder in Kentucky, US

Susan Smith
- Born: Susan Daniels; 1961; Matewan, West Virginia, U.S.
- Died: 8 June 1989 (aged 27–28); Kentucky, U.S
- Cause of death: Strangulation
- Spouse: Kenneth Smith
- Children: 2

Mark Putnam
- Born: Mark Steven Putnam; July 4, 1959 (age 67); Coventry, Connecticut, U.S.
- Education: University of Tampa
- Known for: first FBI agent to be convicted for homicide
- Spouse: Kathy Putnam (m. 1982; died 1998)
- Children: 2

Susan Smith (née Daniels 1961 – June 8, 1989) was an American FBI informant. She was strangled by her handler and lover, FBI agent Mark Putnam—the first FBI agent to be charged in a homicide.

== Early life ==
Susan Daniels Smith was born in 1961 in Matewan, West Virginia, to Sidney "Sid" Daniels, an unemployed former coal miner, and Tracy Daniels, a housekeeper. She was the fifth of nine children. Her parents moved to Freeburn, Kentucky, when Susan was an infant. She studied at Freeburn grade school, but dropped out in 7th grade because of financial problems within her family.

== Events ==
=== Background ===
In 1977, then-still Susan Daniels met Kenneth Smith, a local dealer of methamphetamine, PCP, and cocaine. He was 22 at the time, she was 15. They were married by the time of a November 1979 arrest of Kenneth. By the mid-1980s, Susan had given birth to two children. However, the couple started to have a conflicted relationship, highly compromised by drug abuse. Susan and Kenneth eventually divorced, although they kept sharing their home with each other and their children.

=== Smith's early contact ===
In 1987, an FBI agent named Mark Putnam began his first investigation in Pikeville, Kentucky. His aim was to arrest a 32-year-old ex-convict and bank robber, Carl Edward "Cat Eyes" Lockhart, who was a friend of Kenneth Smith. A local sheriff's deputy, Albert "Bert" Hartfield, recommended that his longtime friend Susan Smith visit Putnam to earn extra income and to help him with the case. Smith and Putnam began to have frequent contact for the exchange of information about Lockhart's upcoming criminal plans. Lockhart was apprehended in December 1987 and the next year sentenced to 57 years in federal prison on charges of robbery. Smith received US$5,000 (equivalent to $14,200 in 2025) for her contribution to the case.

=== Adultery and killing ===
According to Putnam, his contact with Smith became less frequent after Lockhart's case was closed. However, Smith insisted on continuing their relationship, and by mid-1988, they had begun an active sexual relationship. Putnam, however, was aware his behavior could damage his career and his family, and in early 1989, he signed a petition to be transferred from Kentucky to Florida, in order to focus on other cases. Still, in mid-1989 he had to return to complete an unrelated investigation. When he reached Kentucky, Smith contacted him about her pregnancy and told him the baby was his. Putnam insisted he and his wife Kathy could adopt the baby but Smith refused.

On June 8, 1989, Putnam took Smith in his rental car to a clearing, and after a brief discussion and threats by both sides, they began to fight. At that time, Putnam strangled and killed Smith and placed her body in the trunk of his car. The next day, he dumped Smith's body along an old coal mining road. Putnam left Kentucky and returned to his family in Florida. Three days later, Smith was reported missing by her sister, Shelby Ward.

In 1990, the investigation into Smith's death became an FBI matter, as Putnam was under suspicion for her disappearance. Putnam underwent a polygraph exam, which he failed. He subsequently confessed, pleaded guilty to accidentally strangling Smith, and told authorities where to find her body. That same year, he was sentenced to 16 years in prison for first-degree manslaughter.

== Perpetrator ==
Mark Steven Putnam (born July 4, 1959) was a criminologist and served as an FBI agent from 1987 to 1990, and the first FBI agent convicted of murder. He studied at the University of Tampa, where he majored in criminology. In October 1986, Putnam graduated from the FBI Academy and shortly thereafter, married Kathy Putnam, the daughter of a wealthy real estate developer.

He was sentenced to 16 years in prison, and he was released after 10 years due to good behavior, having been described as a "model inmate".

In 1998, while he was still incarcerated, his wife Kathy died from organ failure due to alcoholism.

Putnam was released from prison in 2000, at age 41. He moved to Georgia, remarried, and was working as a personal trainer in 2016.

== In popular culture ==
- The case was the subject of The FBI Killer (1992), a book by Aphrodite Jones.
- The case was the subject of Above Suspicion (1993), a book written by Joe Sharkey.
- The case was featured on a 2016 episode of the Investigation Discovery series Betrayed.
- A film adaptation of the Sharkey book, also titled Above Suspicion, was released in 2019, starring Emilia Clarke as Susan Smith and Jack Huston as Mark Putnam.
