= Murder of Polly Klaas =

American murder case

Polly Klaas
- Born: Polly Hannah Klaas; January 3, 1981; Fairfax, California, U.S.
- Died: October 1, 1993 (aged 12); Petaluma, California, U.S.
- Cause of death: Strangulation
- Body discovered: December 4, 1993
- Website: pollyklaas.org

Polly Hannah Klaas (January 3, 1981 – October 1, 1993) was an American murder victim whose case garnered national media attention. On October 1, 1993, at age 12, she was kidnapped at knifepoint during a slumber party at her mother's home in Petaluma, California, and strangled to death. Richard Allen Davis was convicted of her murder in 1996 and sentenced to death. Following a March 2019 moratorium on the death penalty in California issued by Gavin Newsom, Allen remains in prison in Stockton, California.

== The crime ==
On October 1, 1993, Polly Klaas and two friends, Gillian and Kate, were having a slumber party at the two-bedroom bungalow of Klaas's mother, Eve Nichol. At the time of the kidnapping, Nichol and Klaas's six-year-old half-sister, Annie Nichol, were sleeping in the other room. At about 10:30pm, an intruder named Richard Allen Davis entered the house through an unlocked back door and confronted the three girls with a knife. When he asked the girls which one of them lived there, Polly responded that she did. Davis tied the three girls' hands behind their backs and covered their heads with pillowcases. He asked the girls if there were valuables in the house, but ultimately did not steal any, before kidnapping Klaas.

Over the next two months, about 4,000 people helped search for Klaas. On October 9, actress Winona Ryder, who had been raised in Petaluma, offered a $200,000 reward for Klaas' safe return, saying that seeing a video of Klaas giving a performance on the same junior high school stage on which Ryder began her acting career, also at age 12, which had been shown on the television show America's Most Wanted stirred memories of Ryder's own childhood in Petaluma.

Davis was arrested two months after the kidnapping and led the police to Klaas' body, which he had buried in a shallow grave in Sonoma County, 50 miles north of Klaas' home, after he had strangled her to death. Although Davis repeatedly denied to police that he raped Klaas, he faltered in this after he was pressed on this question, which the prosecution made a point of emphasizing to the jury at his trial. At one point, Davis said, "I don’t think so." He later said, "Not that I can remember." A preliminary test indicated the possible presence of semen on Klaas' corpse, but it was never confirmed, and a condom found at the scene where police believe Klaas had been killed had not been used. Decomposition of Klaas' body made it impossible to confirm or exclude the whether she had been sexually assaulted.

== Conviction ==
After a long and tumultuous trial, Davis was convicted on June 18, 1996, of first-degree murder with four special circumstances (robbery, burglary, kidnapping, and attempted lewd act on a child) in Klaas' death. A San Jose Superior Court jury returned a sentence of death. At his formal sentencing, Davis provoked national outrage by taunting the victim's family, extending both middle fingers at a courtroom camera, and later saying that Klaas' last words just before he killed her implied that her father molested her, a notion for which there was no evidence. Judge Thomas Hastings then formally sentenced Davis to death, telling Davis that his conduct in the courtroom made the decision to pass the death sentence significantly easier.

As of 2024, Davis remains imprisoned in California, following the moratorium on the death penalty in California issued by California governor Gavin Newsom in March 2019, and Davis' transfer to a state prison facility in Stockton. On November 5, 2026, Governor Newsom commuted Davis' death sentence to life without the possibility of parole. The decision to commute Allen's sentence was supported by Jess Nichol, Polly Klaas' sister. However, Marc Klaas criticized Governor Newsom for undermining the jury's verdict. Under California law, Davis's new sentence must be confirmed by the Supreme Court of California due to his prior felony convictions.

== Aftermath and legacy ==
Klaas' body was cremated and her ashes were spread over the Pacific Ocean by her friends and family.

In the wake of the murder, Klaas' father, Marc Klaas, became a child advocate and established the Polly Klaas Foundation (formerly the KlaasKids Foundation).

The all-points bulletin was broadcast on the CHP (California Highway Patrol) channel, which only CHP radios could receive. CHP practice changed after the case. The radio system was upgraded and such bulletins are now broadcast on all police channels through a centralized 911 dispatch system.

Ryder went on to star in the 1994 film version of Little Women, which was dedicated in memory of Klaas, who had been very fond of the book.

In October 1998, a performing arts center was named in her honor in Petaluma, but was closed in 2000 because of building safety issues and a lack of funding. In November 2022, after years of fundraising and building improvements, the Polly Klaas Community Theater reopened.

In the wake of the murder, politicians in California and other U.S. states supported three strikes laws and California's Three Strikes act was signed into law on March 8, 1994.

== In media ==
On October 22, 2024, "Motives & Murder: Cracking the Case: Who Took Polly Klaas?," a fourth season episode of the television series Investigation Discovery, debuted that dramatized the kidnapping and murder.

The A&E television series American Justice released "Free to Kill: The Polly Klaas Murder" on October 23, 1996. The episode exposed the challenges of the penal system to rehabilitate inmates. At the time of his arrest, Davis had been in and out of jail, his convictions ranging from kidnapping to burglary.

The Discovery Channel crime series The FBI Files' first episode's topic centered upon the Polly Klaas case. The episode, which originally aired on October 20, 1998, revealed the details of the FBI agents' collection of evidence and their hunt for the criminal.

On May 9, 2022, Crime Junkie released an episode on Polly Klaas that discussed how the case set a precedent for California's Three Strikes law.

ABC aired an episode of 20/20 centered on the Polly Klaas case called "Taken In The Night" on September 22, 2023.

On January 8, 2024, The New York Times published a guest essay by Polly Klaas's younger sister, Annie Nichol, titled "My Sister Was Murdered 30 Years Ago. True Crime Repackages Our Pain as Entertainment." In the essay, she criticized media coverage of the kidnapping, problems with the subsequent Three-Strikes law, and encouraged the media to be attentive in helping survivors heal.

March 11, 2024 saw the premiere of the documentary "Struck by Justice: The Impact of Polly Klaas", on KGO-TV as part of its ABC7 Originals brand. The film marked 30 years since California's Three Strikes and You're Out Law.

== See also ==
- List of kidnappings (1990–1999)
- List of solved missing person cases (1990s)
