= Justice Leak =

American actor (born 1979)

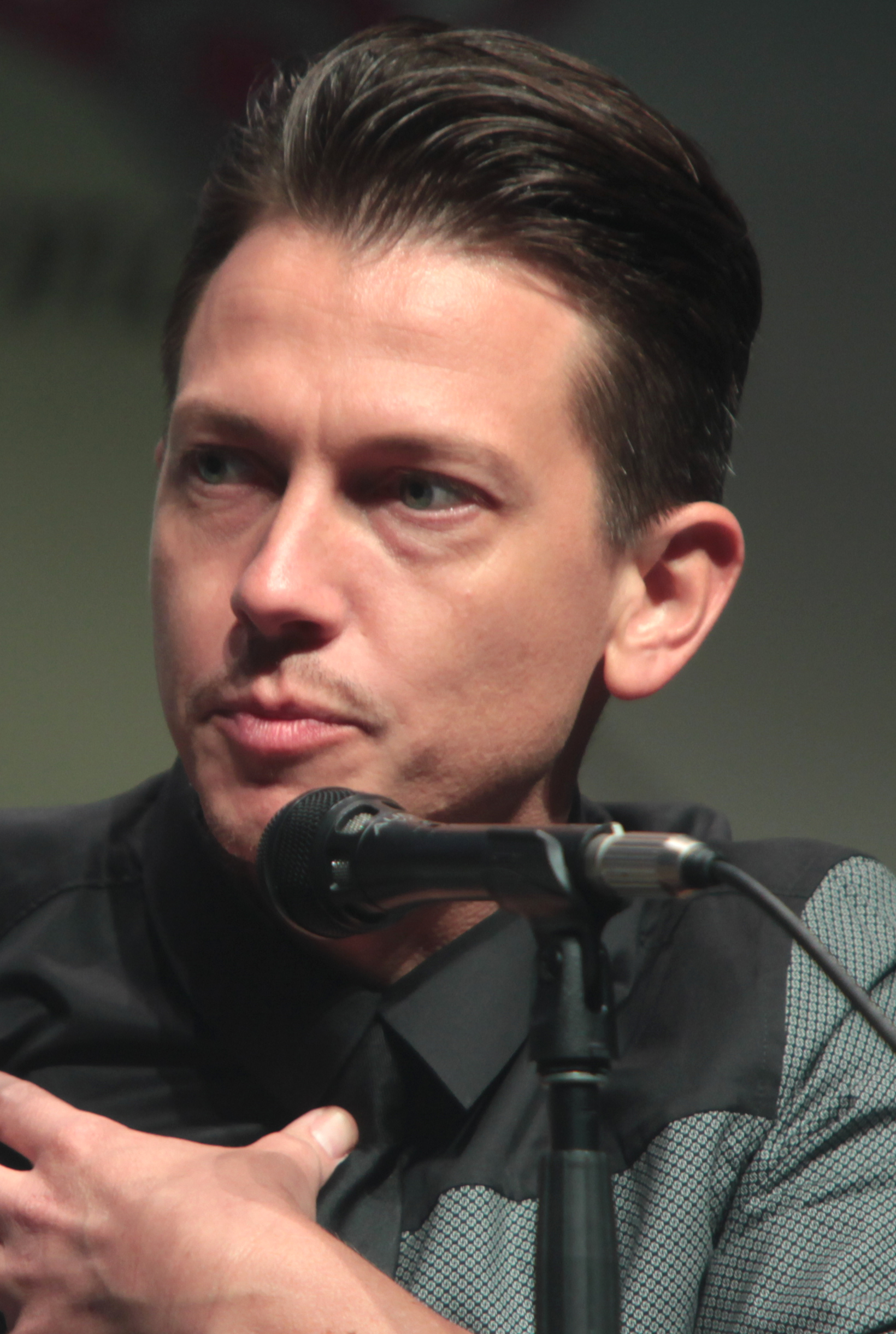
- Leak at WonderCon, April 2015
- Born: September 1, 1979 (age 46); Montgomery, Alabama, U.S.
- Occupation: Actor
- Years active: 2004–present

Justice Adam Leak (born September 1, 1979) is an American film, television and stage actor best known for his portrayal of Harland Osbourne in the 2007 film The Great Debaters.

== Early life ==
Leak was born and raised in Montgomery, Alabama by parents George, a police officer, and Doris, a middle school teacher at Lee Middle School in Newnan, GA. He attended Montgomery's Jefferson Davis High School and says he was very shy until he was chosen to lead the school's marching band as a drum major, which he cites as being "the beginning point for [him] coming out of [his] shell". He studied at a Texas university, but later transferred to Auburn University in Auburn, Alabama to study mass communication; when the communications program became low on funding, he changed his major to theatre arts. At Auburn's drama department, he was helping a student practicing her lines for an audition for The Crucible when the stage director approached Leak and told him that he should audition himself as he would suit one of the lead roles. He won the university's "Best Actor" award and was nominated for two Irene Ryan Awards for his numerous performances.

== Career ==
After obtaining his degree from Auburn University, Leak relocated to Atlanta, Georgia. He was signed to an agency which landed him a number of roles in commercials (such as for Verizon Wireless), television shows, and independent films. He appeared in films such as Bobby Jones: Stroke of Genius, The Cure and Watermelon Honey, and television shows such as K-Ville, Moonlight and Women's Murder Club, which he described as his "training ground" for becoming a professional actor. His agent sent Leak's résumé to the producers of The Great Debaters. When he met Denzel Washington, the director and also an actor in The Great Debaters, in a follow-up callback audition, Leak says "It was one of those moments. I knew my life was about to change." He was given the role of Harland Osbourne, the Harvard University liaison who receives the Wiley College debate team. When he accepted the role in May 2007, he ended his acting stint on Atlanta's longest-running play, Peachtree Battle.

Leak appears in the 2008 film Balancing the Books, and stars in the 2012 film Implanted, which he completed before The Great Debaters and which he is most proud of.

== Personal life ==
Leak and his older sister Liberty were named for their father's love of the criminal justice system. He is trained in ballet, jazz dance, videography and drum-playing.

== Filmography ==
=== Film ===
Year	Title	Role	Notes	Ref.
2004	Bobby Jones: Stroke of Genius	Guy on Street		
2004	Jack O'Lantern	Billy Willis		
2004	Chosen	Carl		
2006	Death of Seasons	Aaron		
2007	The Great Debaters	Harland Osbourne		
2009	Fatal Secrets	Coleman		
2013	Implanted	Ethan Galloway		
2014	Me	Justice		
2015	The Divergent Series: Insurgent	Amity Divergent Husband		
2017	American Made	DEA Agent Winter		
2017	The Hammer	Chase		
2019	Godzilla: King of the Monsters	Monarch Officer Martin		
2021	Charming the Hearts of Men	Dick		
2021	All the Men in My Life	Gabe		
2023	Southern Gospel	T.L. Whittmore		

=== Television ===
Year	Title	Role	Notes	Ref.
2007	K-Ville	Scott Leib	Episode: "No Good Deed"	
2008	Moonlight	Ray Fordham	Episode: "What's Left Behind"	
2008	Women's Murder Club	Billy Harris	Episode: "Never Tell"	
2008	Cold Case	Robby Boreki	Episode: "Glory Days"	
2009	Jessica and Hunter	Acting Assistant	Television film	
2009	Drop Dead Diva	Marcus	Episode: "The Dress"	
2013	Gracious Cafe	Guitarist	Episode: "Detox"	
2014	Dark Secrets	Jeremy Tazman	Episode: "Photo Inoculations"	
2014	Halt and Catch Fire	Neil	Episode: "1984"	
2014	The Walking Dead	Knife Smock Man	Episode: "No Sanctuary"	
2015	Turn: Washington's Spies	Cager	Episode: "Hard Boiled"	
2015	The Vampire Diaries	Malcolm	Episode: "Day One of Twenty-Two Thousand, Give or Take"	
2015	Anne & Jake	Grayson	Episode: "Bar-b-key"	
2015–2016	Powers	Kutter	15 episodes	
2015, 2018	Supergirl	Hellgrammite	2 episodes	
2016	Preacher	Preacher	2 episodes	
2017	Valor	Jack 'Smitty' Smith	2 episodes	
2019	Patsy & Loretta	Doyle Wilburn	Television film	
2019	Swamp Thing	Deputy Tyler	3 episodes	
2019	Raising Dion	Lars	5 episodes	
2021	For All Mankind	Peter	2 episodes	
2021	S.W.A.T.	Bartis	Episode: "Local Heroes"	
2021	The Underground Railroad	James Randall	Episode: "Chapter 1: Georgia"	
2022	The Staircase	Tom Maher	6 episodes	
