= Murder on a Sunday Morning =

2001 documentary film by Jean-Xavier de Lestrade

- Directed by: Jean-Xavier de Lestrade
- Produced by: Denis Poncet
- Cinematography: Isabelle Razavet
- Edited by: Pascal Vernier; Ragnar Van Leyden
- Music by: Hélène Blazy
- Distributed by: Pathé
- Release dates: September 14, 2001 (United States); February 26, 2003 (France)
- Running time: 111 minutes
- Countries: France; United States
- Language: English

Murder on a Sunday Morning (French: Un coupable idéal, lit. An Ideal Culprit) is a 2001 documentary film directed by Jean-Xavier de Lestrade. The documentary explores the Brenton Butler case, in which a fifteen-year-old African-American boy was wrongfully accused and tried for murder in Jacksonville, Florida.

The film follows Butler's public defense attorneys as they piece together the narrative and how the police coerced Butler into confessing. There was no physical evidence found, and the husband's visual identification of Butler as the shooter contradicted his statement to police. The film received critical acclaim and won the Academy Award for Best Documentary Feature at the 74th Academy Awards in 2002.

== Background ==
In Jacksonville, Florida, on the morning of Sunday, May 7, 2000, a tourist Mary Stephens was murdered outside of a Ramada Inn by an unknown young African-American man. On that same morning, fifteen-year-old Brenton Butler was stopped and questioned by police as he was walking past the crime scene, which was not far from his house. Although Butler was shorter and younger than the description of the shooter initially provided by the husband of the victim, who had been standing next to his wife when she was shot, the husband identified Butler as the killer to police.

Butler was arrested, and interrogated for twelve hours without the presence of his parents or a lawyer. He signed a confession. No other suspects were pursued and Butler was charged and tried for murder without any physical evidence against him. At trial, the prosecution's case was based solely on the positive eyewitness identification and Butler's signed confession, which Butler later testified he had signed due to physical coercion by police.

== Summary ==
The film follows Butler's defense team as they build their case and present it in court. Beginning with the primary witness, Stephens' husband, and moving toward the confession, the film showcases how the public defender's office refutes the prosecution's narrative. Defense attorneys submit photographs of Butler's bruised face, confirming their claim that Butler was hit in the face and stomach during interrogation.

In the end, the jury deliberates for 45 minutes before finding Butler not guilty of any criminal misconduct. Following Butler's acquittal, the public defender's office presented another suspect, Juan Curtis.

== Aftermath ==
After Butler was acquitted, the police and the prosecutors were strongly criticized by a grand jury that investigated the case and the behavior of the police.

Eventually, the Duval County sheriff was put in charge of the murder case and ordered it reopened. After investigation, Juan Curtis was indicted and tried. In 2002, he was convicted of the murder.

== Release ==
After the film won an Academy Award, HBO broadcast Murder on a Sunday Morning in 2002. Docurama released the film on DVD in 2003. It is now available for streaming on other media.
