= Hellgrammite (comics) =

DC Comics supervillain

- Hellgrammite as depicted in Action Comics #673 (January 1992). Art by Dan Jurgens and Bob McLeod.

Publication information
- Publisher: DC Comics
- First appearance: The Brave and the Bold #80 (November 1968)
- Created by: Bob Haney, Neal Adams

In-story information
- Alter ego: Roderik Rose
- Species: Metahuman
- Team affiliations: Intergang
- Notable aliases: Robert Dobson
- Abilities: Superhuman strength, durability, and leaping; Wall-crawling; Cocoon generation

Hellgrammite (Roderik Rose) is a supervillain appearing in comic books published by DC Comics, commonly as an enemy of Superman, Batman, the Creeper, Green Arrow and Black Canary.

Justice Leak portrays the character in the series Supergirl.

== Publication history ==
Hellgrammite first appeared in The Brave and the Bold #80 (November 1968), and was created by Bob Haney and Neal Adams. In this issue, he battled Batman and the Creeper.

== Fictional character biography ==
=== Pre-Crisis ===
Roderik Rose is an entomologist who subjected himself to a mutagenic process that transforms him into a grasshopper-like insectoid. He has superhuman physical abilities and can crawl on walls and generate durable cocoons. A number of his schemes revolve around transforming others into weaker, subordinate versions of himself.

=== Post-Crisis ===
In the post-Crisis DC Universe, Hellgrammite returns as a recurring foe for Superman, first encountering the Man of Steel after being hired by LexCorp board member George Markham to kill Lex Luthor. During the Underworld Unleashed crossover, he makes a deal with Neron, trading his soul to gain increased power.

Hellgrammite is presumed dead during the Our Worlds at War event, but it is later revealed that a similar villain, Larvanaut, died instead. Hellgrammite appears alive in the "One Year Later" event as an assassin for Intergang.

After Prometheus destroys Star City, the new Batman leads the Justice League in a hunt to track down the various villains who helped Prometheus in his plot. The team finds Hellgrammite and several other villains attempting to flee the country and a battle ensues. Hellgrammite is ultimately defeated after Donna Troy ties up a villainess named Harpi with her lasso, and then swings her into the villain, knocking both of them out.

== Powers and abilities ==
Hellgrammite is super-strong and durable, able to jump long distances, secrete adhesives, and produce cocoons that can transform those imprisoned in them into drone versions of himself. In both forms, he has expertise in entomology.

== In other media ==
=== Television ===
- Hellgrammite makes a non-speaking appearance in the Justice League Unlimited episode "Alive!" as a member of the Secret Society. He sides with Gorilla Grodd during his attempted uprising against Lex Luthor, leading to him being frozen by Killer Frost and apparently killed by Darkseid.
- Hellgrammite appears in the Batman: The Brave and the Bold episode "Time Out for Vengeance!", voiced by John DiMaggio.
- Hellgrammite appears in Supergirl, portrayed by Justice Leak. This version is an alien who possesses the ability to camouflage himself as a humanoid and generate spikes capable of piercing metal, though he requires DDT sources to survive as it is the closest analogue to his planet's food.

=== Video games ===
Hellgrammite appears as a character summon in Scribblenauts Unmasked: A DC Comics Adventure.

=== Miscellaneous ===
Hellgrammite appears in Adventures in the DC Universe #17.
