= Jean-Xavier de Lestrade =

French writer, director and producer (b. 1963)

- Born: 1 July 1963 (age 63); Mirande, France
- Occupations: Film director, producer, screenwriter, cinematographer
- Years active: 1989–present

Jean-Xavier de Lestrade (born 1 July 1963) is a French writer, director and producer of films and television series. He is especially known for his documentaries that have explored criminal cases in the United States, most notably in his 2004 miniseries The Staircase.

== Early life and education ==
Lestrade was born in Mirande, Gers, in southwestern France. He studied law and journalism in Paris. He has drawn from these to inform making film documentaries that scrutinize the mechanisms of society, particularly justice systems.

== Career ==
After college, Lestrade started working in journalism.

In 1992 Lestrade started making documentaries. He won an Oscar for Best Documentary Feature for his ninth film, Murder on a Sunday Morning (2001). It was about the Brenton Butler case in Jacksonville, Florida. A 15-year-old African-American youth was wrongfully arrested and tried for murder of a woman tourist. He was acquitted.

Several months later, another suspect was investigated and prosecuted by law enforcement. A jury convicted him for murder of Mary Stephens. Evidence included his fingerprint on her handbag, which had been recovered.

Lestrade is also known for his limited series The Staircase (2004), about the murder trial of author Michael Peterson of Durham, North Carolina. He was charged with killing his wife Kathleen. He produced two followups to the original series, chronicling Peterson's appeals and retrial, one in 2012 and one in 2018.

Lestrade is an executive producer for the TV series Sin City Law (2007), which has been shown on the Sundance Channel in the US.

His dramatic miniseries Laetitia (2020), based on the murder case of Laetitia Perrais of Nantes, France, was first aired on French TV in 2020. It aired on HBO and HBO Max in late August 2021.

While most of his documentaries were in English, in 2023, he directed the six-part true crime series Sambre - Anatomy of a Crime, which was produced in French.

== Filmography ==
Year	Title	Role	Notes
1989	Beauty Parlor	Cinematographer	Short
1995	La cavale des innocents	Director	TV movie
1998	Une Australie blanche et pure	Director, Writer & Cinematographer	TV movie Festival International de Programmes Audiovisuels - Reports and Social Issues
1998	La vie jusqu'au bout	Director	TV movie
1998	Des enfants plein d'espoir	Director	TV movie
1999	D'un amour à l'autre	Director	TV movie
2001	La justice des hommes	Director & Producer	TV movie Albert Londres Prize - Audio-Visual
2001	Murder on a Sunday Morning	Director	Documentary; Academy Award for Best Documentary Feature; Christopher Award - Television & Cable; Prix Italia - Documentary - Current Affairs
2002	Madame la principale	Producer	TV movie
2003	Qui a tué Cécile Bloch ?	Writer & Executive Producer	Documentary
2003	Un rêve algérien	Producer	Documentary
2004	Soupçons	Director, Writer & Cinematographer	TV mini-series International Documentary Association - Limited Series
2004	L'affaire Dubois	Writer & Executive producer	TV movie
2004	Avant les assises, une affaire de viol	Executive producer	Documentary
2004	Avant les assises, une affaire de meurtre	Executive producer	Documentary
2006	L'aventure MSF	Producer	TV mini-series
2007	How Much Is Your Life Worth ?	Executive producer	TV movie
2008	Sur ta joue ennemie	Director, Producer & Writer	
2008	Sin City Law	Writer & Producer	TV series (2 episodes); International Documentary Association - Limited Series
2009	Hors Série	Director, Producer & Writer	TV series (1 episode)
2010	Cigarettes et bas nylon	Producer	TV movie
2010	FBI : Police d'Etat	Co-Producer	TV series (1 episode)
2011	Un si long voyage	Executive producer	Documentary
2012	La disparition	Director, Writer & Producer	TV movie
2013	The Staircase II: The Last Chance	Director, Writer & Executive producer	Documentary
2014	3xManon	Director & Writer	TV mini-series Festival International de Programmes Audiovisuels - Fiction; French Syndicate of Cinema Critics - Best Television Series
2014	Infrarouge	Director	TV series (1 episode)
2015	Malaterra	Director	TV mini-series
2016	Infrarouge	Producer	TV series (1 episode)
2023	Sambre - Anatomy of a Crime	Director	TV series (6 episodes)
