= Murder of Michelle Le =

American murder case

- Location: Hayward, California, U.S.
- Date: May 27, 2011; 15 years ago
- Attack type: Murder
- Victim: Michelle Hoang Thi Le
- Perpetrator: Giselle Diwag Esteban
- Motive: Revenge based on the false belief that Le had sexual relations with her ex-boyfriend
- Verdict: Guilty
- Convictions: First degree murder
- Sentence: 25 years to life in prison

On May 27, 2011, Michelle Hoang Thi Le (October 12, 1984 – May 27, 2011) a 26-year-old American nursing student from the Kaiser Permanente Medical Center, was murdered in the San Francisco Bay Area city of Hayward, California, by 27-year-old Giselle Diwag Esteban.

== Biography ==
Michelle Le
- Born: Michelle Hoang Thi Le; October 12, 1984; San Diego, California, U.S.
- Died: May 27, 2011 (aged 26); Hayward, California, U.S.
- Cause of death: Murder
- Body discovered: September 17, 2011

Le, of Vietnamese descent, grew up in the Rancho Peñasquitos neighborhood of San Diego with her younger brother, Michael. She graduated from Mt. Carmel High School in 2002. Le attended San Jose State University and later transferred to San Francisco State University and studied nursing at Samuel Merritt University in Oakland, California.

== Investigation ==
Giselle Esteban
- Born: Giselle Diwag Esteban; February 4, 1984 (age 42); Union City, California, U.S.
- Children: 2
- Status: Incarcerated, eligible for parole in 2037
- Motive: Revenge
- Conviction: First degree murder
- Penalty: 25 years to life in prison

Details
- Date: May 27, 2011
- Killed: 1 (Michelle Le)
- Date apprehended: September 7, 2011

On May 27, 2011 Le's white Honda SUV was found the morning after her disappearance around 9am parked on Ponderosa Court, about half a mile from the medical center.

Her family put up billboards and offered a reward for information about her whereabouts. Over the next four months, at least eight volunteer search efforts were undertaken, some organized by the Klaas Kids Foundation.

A variety of missing persons organizations joined in the searches. The eighth search found decomposed human remains in a remote canyon area on September 17. On September 19, 2011, the Alameda County coroner's office positively identified the remains to be those of Michelle Le.

Police suspected from the beginning that Le had been killed by someone she knew. Giselle Diwag Esteban (born February 4, 1984) of Union City, California, a former friend of Le, was arrested on September 7 and charged with her murder, although a body had not yet been found at that time. Authorities said there was enough DNA evidence in the form of blood stains found in Le's car and on Esteban's shoe, and that security video footage confirmed Esteban's presence in the area at the time Le disappeared. Esteban allegedly blamed Le for ruining her relationship with her ex-boyfriend, with whom she had a child, but denied any involvement in Le's disappearance. Esteban was indicted on a murder charge December 14, 2011.

== Trial ==
Esteban entered a not guilty plea. A trial date was set for September 17, 2012. On October 29, 2012, a jury convicted Esteban of first-degree murder. At the December 10 sentencing, Esteban was given 25 years to life in prison. At the time of Le's murder, Esteban was pregnant. Esteban gave birth in prison and the child is in the custody of the father.

== See also ==
- List of solved missing person cases (2010s)
