= List of solved missing person cases (1980s) =

== 1980 ==
Date	Person(s)	Age	Country of disappearance	Circumstances	Outcome	Time spent missing or unconfirmed
1980	Marcia King	21	United States of America	Marcia King left home in Little Rock, Arkansas, on an unknown date in 1980. She traveled across the United States and was murdered in Troy, Ohio, in April 1981 at the age of 21. King's body was identified in 2018.	Murdered	37 years
February 13th, 1980	Timothy White	5	United States of America	Timothy White disappeared in California on February 13, 1980, and it was later revealed that he was abducted by a man named Kenneth Parnell. He escaped on March 1, 1980, with the help of Steven Stayner, who had been abducted by Parnell almost eight years earlier.	Found alive	15 days
February 14th, 1980	Michael Rosenblum	25	United States of America	Michael Rosenblum was last seen alive on February 14, 1980, angrily driving his girlfriend's car away from a West Homestead, Pennsylvania, gas station; it was found an hour later abandoned and severely damaged along a road in nearby Baldwin, whose police department did not make public that it had the car for over three months. That, and other circumstantial evidence suggesting that the Baldwin police knew more about Rosenblum's disappearance than they claimed, accumulated over the next several years and led to the police chief being fired and reinstated in 1987. A skull fragment found in 1992 in woods near where the car was found was matched to Rosenblum; how he died is still unknown.	Died (unknown cause)	12 years
March 10th, 1980	Sherri Jarvis	14	United States of America	Sherri Jarvis ran away from her juvenile detention hearing at the Washington County Courthouse shortly after her 14th birthday in March 1980. She traveled with 2 unidentified sisters to Green Bay, Wisconsin. The sisters decided to return home, but Sherri refused and walked away from them. In August 1980, Sherri wrote a letter to her family from Denver, Colorado stating that she was upset over being incarcerated and that they wouldn't hear from her until she was "at least 18 or 21". Sherri's body was discovered on the morning of November 1, 1980, in Huntsville, Texas, but remained unidentified until November 2021.	Murdered	41 years
April 3rd, 1980	Cynthia Gastelle	18	United States of America	Cynthia Gastelle disappeared on April 3, 1980, while going to a job interview in Takoma Park, Maryland. Her skeletal remains were found on February 12, 1982, in a secluded wooded area on Bull Run Mountain in Haymarket, Virginia, but remained unidentified for 30 years.	Murdered	30 years
May 16th, 1980	Jessie Earl	22	United Kingdom	Earl disappeared from Eastbourne in May 1980, with her body only discovered in 1989 near Beachy Head. As of November 2020, the investigation into her murder is ongoing. Police have investigated links between Earl's murder and serial killer Peter Tobin, who lived in the area at the time of her murder.	Murdered	9 years
May 16th, 1980	Mary Stauffer	36	United States of America	Mary and daughter Bethy Stauffer were kidnapped on May 16, 1980, by Mary's former ninth-grade student and stalker, Ming Sen Shiue in Roseville, Minnesota, after mother and daughter were leaving a beauty salon before the family's move to the Philippines for missionary work. Alongside kidnapping the Stauffers, Shiue also kidnapped and later murdered six-year-old Jason Wilkman, who had noticed Shiue's stopped vehicle by sheer coincidence. On July 7, 1980, Shiue left the house for work, allowing Mary and Beth to escape by Mary pulling one of the hinge pins on the door and call the police. Shiue was later arrested, attacked Mary at his second trial hearing, and was sentenced to life imprisonment under federal charges, 40 years under Minnesota.	Found alive	53 days
May 16th, 1980	Elizabeth Stauffer	8	United States of America		Found alive	53 days
May 28th, 1980	Dorothy Jane Scott	32	United States of America	Dorothy Jane Scott disappeared while getting her car on May 28, 1980, in Anaheim, California, after she had taken two co-workers to the hospital. On August 6, 1984, a construction worker discovered dog and human bones, side by side, about 30 feet (10 m) from Santa Ana Canyon Road. The human bones were later identified as being Scott's. The identity and motive of her killer or killers remains unknown.	Murdered	4 years
June 16th, 1980	Patsy Morris	14	United Kingdom	Morris was a schoolgirl who disappeared from her school in west London, England, during her lunch break on 16 June 1980. Police and members of the community spent two days searching for her until her fully-clothed body was found on Hounslow Heath, having been strangled. Her murder remains unsolved although in 2008 it was revealed that she was the childhood girlfriend of west London serial killer Levi Bellfield and that he had allegedly confessed to the crime in prison.	Murdered	2 days
June 23rd, 1980	Debra Colliander	25	United States of America	Colliander was abducted from an Aurora, Illinois parking lot by serial killer Bruce Lindahl in June 1980 and brought back to his apartment where he raped her. Colliander escaped after Lindahl fell asleep and was able to notify authorities, leading to Lindahl's arrest. Before she could testify in court, Colliander disappeared again in October of 1980 (see below entry).	Found alive	1 day
July 20th, 1980	Brenda Gerow	20	United States of America	Brenda Gerow was an American woman who disappeared on July 20, 1980, after leaving home with her boyfriend at the time. She was found dead in the desert at Pima County, Arizona, on April 8, 1981, but remained unidentified for 34 years.	Murdered	34 years
August 17th, 1980	Azaria Chamberlain	9 weeks	Australia	An Australian baby girl who disappeared on the night of August 17, 1980, during a family camping trip in Uluru. Although her remains have never been found her mother insisted that a dingo had taken her from her camping tent. In a trial sensationalized by the media her mother was found guilty of murder and sentenced to life in prison. Her sentence was overturned six years later when Azaria's jacket was found in a dingo lair. Azaria's disappearance was the subject of four inquests, the last of which in 2012, concluded that a dingo had taken and killed her.	Died (animal attack	6 years
October 4th, 1980	Tammy Terrell	17	United States of America	Terrell was an American teenager who was last seen in the company of an unknown couple at the Roswell State Fair in Roswell, New Mexico on October 4, 1980. Her body was found in Henderson, Nevada on the following day, but remained unidentified until December 2021. Her murder remains unsolved.	Murdered	41 years
October 7th, 1980	Debra Colliander	25	United States of America	Colliander had previously been kidnapped and raped by serial killer Bruce Lindahl and her report led to his arrest, but Colliander disappeared again on October 7th, 1980. Without their key witness, the court dropped all charges against Lindahl and released him from custody. Colliander's body would be found in 1982, after which an alleged friend of Lindahl informed police that Lindahl had offered him a reward to "get rid" of Colliander.	Murdered	2 years
October 11th, 1980	Marlene Oakes	25	United States of America	Marlene Oakes was an American woman who was murdered by her husband on October 11, 1980, in Verona, Kentucky. On November 29, 1981, half of a skull was found buried near her house but it would not identified as Oakes until 2001.	Murdered	21 years
October 17th, 1980	Giorgio Giamonna	25	Italy	Giamonna and Galatola were two Italian gay men who went missing on October 17, 1980. The bodies of both were discovered in the town of Giarre on October 31, 1980. Both had been shot in the head and were discovered holding hands. The perpetrator of the murders was never identified, but is believed to have been the 13-year-old nephew of one of the victims. Their deaths led to the widespread recognition of homophobia among the Italian public and the strengthening and recognition of Italian gay rights movements.	Murdered	2 weeks
October 17th, 1980	Antonio Galatola	15	Italy		Murdered	2 weeks
October, 1980	Harold "Dean" Clouse Jr.	21	United States of America	Young couple Dean and Tina Clouse and their infant daughter Holly Marie Clouse went missing from their home in Lewisville, Texas, where they had moved recently from New Smyrna Beach, Florida. The murdered remains of Dean and Tina were discovered outside of Houston on January 12, 1981, and no infant remains were found at the scene. Dean and Tina were identified through forensic genealogy in 2021, and Holly Marie was found alive in 2022, in Oklahoma. Not much is known about Holly Marie between the time she disappeared and when she was turned over to a church, but the pastor who received her told authorities that two women had also given him Holly Marie's birth certificate as well as a note allegedly from Dean giving Holly up. Dean and Tina's murders are still under investigation but police believe they may have been involved with a "Jesus Freak" cult.	Murdered	40 years
October, 1980	Tina Linn Clouse	17	United States of America		Murdered	40 years
October, 1980	Holly Marie Clouse	1	United States of America		Found alive	41 years
November 17th, 1980	Christine Weller	12	Canada	One of several victims of serial child killer Clifford Olson. Weller was abducted from Surrey, British Columbia on November 17, 1980, and her body was found a month later on Christmas Day.	Murdered	1 month

== 1981 ==
Date	Person(s)	Age	Country of disappearance	Circumstances	Outcome	Time spent missing or unconfirmed
1981	Bryon McCane II	4	United States of America	McCane II, a 4 year-old boy at the time (who later become the rapper known as Bizzy Bone), was abducted by his stepfather, together with his two sisters, sometime in 1981. For the next two years, the trio was moved around various homes across Oklahoma, with McCane being tortured and sexually assaulted. He and his sisters were finally rescued after a babysitter realized that he was a missing person and contacted the authorities	Found alive	2 years
January 1st 1981	Eugene Simons	26	Northern Ireland	Eugene Simons, a plumber and married father of three from Castlewellan, County Down, disappeared on 1 January 1981. On 24 May 1984, his body was discovered by chance in a shallow grave near the village of Knockbridge, southwest of Dundalk in County Louth, reportedly by a dog walker.	Murdered	3 years
April 11th, 1981	Tina Louise Sharp	12	United States of America	Sharp was one of four murder victims killed in the resort town of Keddie, California, in April 1981. The other three victims—her mother, 15-year-old brother and his 17-year-old friend—were discovered at the crime scene, whereas Sharp's body was discovered in Butte County three years later. All four murders remain unsolved.	Murdered	3 years
April 16, 1981	Colleen Marian Bridgette Daignault	13	Canada	One of several victims of serial child killer Clifford Olson. Daignault—a Surrey, British Columbia, schoolgirl—disappeared while returning to her parents' home following a sleepover at a friend's home on April 16, 1981; her skeletal remains were discovered on September 17 the same year.	Murdered	5 months
April 22nd, 1981	Daryn Todd Johnsrude	16	Canada	A further victim of serial child killer Clifford Olson. Johnsrude was Olson's third-known victim; his body was found in woodland on May 2, 1981—ten days after his April 22 disappearance. Johnsrude had died of skull fractures.	Murdered	10 days
April 27th, 1981	Ciro Cirillo	60	Italy	Italian Christian Democratic politician who was kidnapped by members of the Red Brigades in Naples on April 27, 1981. He was held for ransom, but later released after a controversial deal was made with the Red Brigades, paying them one and a half million lire, which was provided with the help of Camorra crime boss Raffaele Cutolo.	Found alive	3 months
May, 1981	Danny McIlhone	20	Ireland	Danny McIlhone was abducted by the Provisional IRA in Dublin in May 1981 and his remains were found in 2008.	Murdered	27 years
May 5th, 1981	Al Indelicato	50	United States of America	On May 5, 1981, infighting within the Bonanno crime family, led to Dominic Trinchera, Philip Giaccone, and Al Indelicato, being murdered by a rival faction of the family in Brooklyn, New York. Their bodies were buried in a lot in Lindenwood, Queens. On May 28, authorities discovered Indelicato's body and removed it. More than two decades later, in October 2004, after some children reported finding a body in the lot, FBI agents excavated the property and discovered the bodies of Trinchera and Giaccone. In December 2004, the bodies were positively identified as Giaccone and Trinchera.	Murdered	23 days
May 5th, 1981	Philip Giaccone	48	United States of America		Murdered	24 years
May 5th, 1981	Dominick Trinchera	44	United States of America		Murdered	24 years
May 19th, 1981	Sandra Lynn Wolfsteiner	16	Canada	The fourth-known victim of serial child killer Clifford Olson. Wolfsteiner was lured into Osen's vehicle while hitchhiking home from her boyfriend's apartment. Her remains were later discovered in Fraser Valley, fifty miles east of Vancouver.	Murdered	2 months
June 22nd, 1981	Suzanne Bombardier	14	United States of America	Bombardier, a teenager, disappeared on June 22, 1980, while babysitting her nieces in Antioch, CA. A fisherman discovered Bombardier's body in the San Joaquin River on June 27, 1980. After extensive DNA profiling, 63 year old Mitchel Lynn Bacom was convicted of her murder on March 17, 2022.	Murdered	5 days
July 2nd, 1981	Karen Price	15	United Kingdom	Karen Price was a girl from Wales who was last seen on July 2, 1981. Price ran away from a children's home and police later found she had turned to prostitution before her death. Her remains were found on December 7, 1989, when workmen unearthed a rolled carpet while installing a garden behind a house. She was identified by her DNA in what is cited as one of the first instances in which DNA technology was used in this way in the UK.	Murdered	8 years
July 9th, 1981	Judy Elizabeth Kozma	14	Canada	A further victim of serial child killer Clifford Olson. Kozma was last seen alive in New Westminster on July 9, 1981; her body was discovered on July 25. She had been stabbed to death.	Murdered	2 weeks
July 15th, 1981	Mary Louise Day	13	United States of America	Teenage girl who ran away from her parents' home in Seaside, California on July 15, 1981. She remained missing until 2003, when a woman in the Phoenix area was identified via DNA as Day.	Found alive	22 years
July 27th, 1981	Adam Walsh	6	United States of America	Adam Walsh was an American boy who was abducted from the Hollywood Mall in Hollywood, Florida, on July 27, 1981. His severed head was found two weeks later in a drainage canal alongside Florida's Turnpike in rural St. Lucie County, Florida. Drifter Otis Toole confessed to Walsh's murder, but due to poor handling by the Hollywood Police he was never convicted of the crime.	Murdered	2 weeks
July 29th, 1981	Vishal Mehrotra	8	United Kingdom	Mehrotra was an 8-year-old boy who disappeared on July 29, 1981, from Putney, London. On February 25, 1982, some of Mehrotra's remains were found in Sussex on an isolated Farm.	Murdered	7 months
August 12th, 1981	Jennifer Cardy	9	United Kingdom	Nine-year-old Cardy disappeared from Ballinderry, County Antrim on 12 August 1981. She had left her home to cycle a short distance away to meet a friend, but her bicycle was later found thrown over a hedge close to her home. Six days later her body was found in Hillsborough. She had been abducted and murdered by paedophile Robert Black, although he wasn't convicted for it until 2011. Before he died, Black was about to be charged in relation to the very similar case of the disappearance of Genette Tate near Exeter in 1978. She disappeared while delivering newspapers on her bicycle and was never found.	Murdered	6 days
August 16th, 1981	Charles Armstrong	55	Crossmaglen, Northern Ireland	A labourer abducted and murdered by the Provisional Irish Republican Army in August 1981; his body was discovered in County Monaghan on 29 July 2010.	Murdered	29 years
August 17th, 1981	Dominick Napolitano	51	United States of America	Organized crime leaders ordered the murder of Dominick Napolitano. Responding to a summons, on August 17, 1981, he went to a meeting, knowing that he would be killed. On August 12, 1982, a body was found at South Avenue and Bridge Street in Arlington, Staten Island which proved to be Napolitano.	Murdered	1 year
September 15, 1981	Ursula Herrmann	10	West Germany	Ursula Herrmann was kidnapped in West Germany on September 15, 1981, and held captive by an unidentified assailant who called her family to demand ransom. Despite the family gathering the sum, no further instructions were given, and Ursula's body was found two weeks later, buried in the woods. A neighbor of the Herrmanns, Werner Mazurek, was later found guilty of the crime and sentenced to life imprisonment.	Murdered	2 weeks
September 22nd, 1981	Kalingam Mariappan	45	Singapore	On 22 September 1981, 45-year-old boilerman Kalingam Mariappan was reported missing after he failed to return home for the past two days. According to a witness, he saw Kalingam leaving on a lorry with two young men after having drinks with them. Thereafter, the two men - 16-year-old Rathakrishnan Ramasamy and 22-year-old Ramu Annadavascan - were arrested, and one of them, Rathakrishnan, confessed to the police that Kalingam was dead, and led them to East Coast Parkway where Kalingam's burnt body was found. After the confirmation of the victim's death, the two men were charged with murder, and it ended with Ramu being sentenced to death while Rathakrishnan was imprisoned indefinitely as he was still a minor when killing Kalingam.	Murdered	5 days
October 29th, 1981	Tina Harmon	12	United States of America	Tina Harmon was an American girl who was abducted, raped, and murdered on October 29, 1981, by Robert Anthony Buell after being dropped off at a convenience store in Lodi, Ohio, by her father's girlfriend. Her body was found in a nearby town five days after her abduction.	Murdered	5 days
November 14th, 1981	Roswitha Fuchsbichler	13	Canada	On 14 November 1981, Roswitha Fuchsbichler went missing on the Highway of Tears at Prince George and was murdered by Edward Dennis Isaac.	Murdered	1 week
December 14th, 1981	Dana Bradley	14	Canada	Bradley disappeared while hitchhiking along the Topsail Road in St. John's, Newfoundland. Her body was found four days later; her skull had been crushed with a blunt instrument and she had been sexually assaulted. Despite extensive news coverage and rigorous investigation, the case remains unsolved.	Murdered	4 days
December 29th, 1981	Julio Iglesias Sr.	66	Spain	Iglesias Sr. was a Spanish gynecologist and father of singer–songwriter Julio Iglesias who was kidnapped and held hostage by ETA separatists in December 1981. He was held for two weeks before being rescued by a police anti-terrorism unit.	Found alive	2 weeks

== 1982 ==
Date	Person(s)	Age	Country of disappearance	Circumstances	Outcome	Time spent missing or unconfirmed
January, 1982	Tulasa Thapa	13	Nepal	Tulasa Thapa was a Nepali girl who was kidnapped and sold into prostitution in India, where she was systematically abused and raped by her abductors. She was eventually released, admitted to a hospital and saved, but suffered permanent psychological and health issues which led to her premature death in 1995.	Found alive	10 months
January 9th, 1982	Lynette Dawson	33	Australia	Lynette Dawson was the wife of Australian teacher and rugby league player Chris Dawson. She disappeared on 9 January 1982; her remains have never been found. Her disappearance was the subject of intense public interest due to her husband's extramarital affair with a student of his who then was only 16. On 5 December 2018, Chris Dawson was charged with the murder of Lynette, but pleaded not guilty in June 2019. In February 2020, he was committed to stand trial for the murder of Lynette. On 30 August 2022, Chris Dawson was found guilty on Lynette's murder, and sentenced on 2 December to 24 years in jail with a non-parole period of 18 years.	Murdered	Never found
January 31st, 1982	Kathleen McCormack Durst	29	United States of America	A medical student, Durst disappeared on 31 January 1982 after leaving the house of a friend to return to the South Salem, New York, residence that she shared with her husband. She has not been seen since and was declared legally dead in 2001. Since her marriage was deteriorating, police strongly suspected that her husband, Robert Durst, had murdered her, citing inconsistencies in statements he gave them. He is suspected in two other disappearances and served three years in prison for evidence-tampering in the death of a third person. On 17 September 2021, he was convicted of Kathleen's murder.	Murdered	39 years
February 4th, 1982	Carolyn Eaton	17	United States of America	Carolyn Eaton was a 17-year-old girl whose body was discovered along Interstate 40 in Williams, Arizona, on February 14, 1982; she had last been seen alive in the company of an older male on February 4 at the Monte Carlo Truck Stop near Ash Fork, Arizona. Her body was identified via genetic genealogy on February 22, 2021.	Murdered	39 years
March 20th, 1982	Nava Elimelech	11	Israel	Elimelech disappeared while going to a friend's house in Bat Yam, Israel on March 20, 1982. A search party later found her severed head wrapped in a plastic bag, along with the rest of her remains. Her murder is unsolved.	Murdered	10 days
June 1st, 1982	Michelle Garvey	14	United States of America	Michelle Garvey was a teenage girl who ran away from her home in Connecticut on June 1st, 1982. On July 1st, the body of a teenage girl was found in Baytown, TX, but would not be identified as Garvey until 2014.	Murdered	32 years
June 10th, 1982	Christelle Bancourt	12	France	Abducted while going to an appointed meeting with her dentist in Marseille, France, on June 10, 1982, Bancourt's kidnapper, an acquaintance named Christian Marletta, later raped and strangled her before dismembering the body, which was found a month later.	Murdered	1 month
June 11th, 1982	Zechariah Baumel	22	Lebanon	IDF soldier who was declared missing in action on June 11, 1982, during the Battle of Sultan Yacoub in the 1982 Lebanon War. In 2019, President of Russia Vladimir Putin announced that the Russian Army, in coordination with the Syrian military, had found Baumel's remains in the old Martyrs' Cemetery in the Yarmouk refugee camp south of Damascus, Syria.	Killed in action	37 years
June 11th, 1982	Hezi Shai	28	Lebanon	IDF tank commander who was declared missing in action on June 11, 1982, during the 1982 Lebanon War. Shai, who had been captured by PFLP-GC militants, was later released as part of a prisoner exchange in 1985.	Found alive	3 years
June 24th, 1982	Dawn Olanick	17	United States of America	Dawn Olanick, who was formerly known as "Princess Doe", was a teenage girl from West Babylon, New York who went missing on June 24, 1982. Olanick's then unidentified body was found in Cedar Ridge Cemetery in Blairstown, New Jersey on July 15th, 1982. Thanks to modern DNA testing she was identified in 2022.	Murdered	40 years
July 17th, 1982	Krista Harrison	11	United States of America	Krista Harrison was murdered on July 17, 1982, in Marshallville, Ohio. Her body was found 6 days later. The case remained unsolved for two years, until Robert Anthony Buell was convicted of her murder.	Murdered	6 days
July 30th, 1982	Susan Maxwell	11	United Kingdom	11-year-old Maxwell vanished after last being seen walking alone in the English village of Cornhill-on-Tweed on July 30, 1982. 13 days later her body was found 264 miles away in Staffordshire. She had been abducted and murdered by paedophile and serial killer Robert Black.	Murdered	13 days
August 6th, 1982	George Bentley	66	Canada	Bob and Jackie Johnson, their two daughters Janet and Karen, as well as Jackie's parents George and Edith Bentley went missing after failing to return from a camping trip in Wells Gray Provincial Park, British Columbia, having last been heard from when Edith called another of her daughters on August 6th, 1982. The family's remains were found in the burned remnants of one of their cars on September 13th; the four adults had been shot in the head and the bodies burned, while the two girls had been shot in the head and left in the trunk. David William Shearing was arrested and confessed to their murders.	Murdered	1 month
August 6th, 1982	Edith Bentley	59	Canada		Murdered	1 month
August 6th, 1982	Bob Johnson	44	Canada		Murdered	1 month
August 6th, 1982	Jackie Johnson	41	Canada		Murdered	1 month
August 6th, 1982	Janet Johnson	13	Canada		Murdered	1 month
August 6th, 1982	Karen Johnson	11	Canada		Murdered	1 month
August 26th, 1982	Rachael Runyan	3	United States of America	Rachael Runyan was an American girl from Sunset, Utah who was kidnapped on 26 August 1982 and was found dead in a creek bed in nearby Morgan County three weeks later. Her murder has never been solved but her case led to Utah implementing the Rachael Alert for child abductions in the state, later becoming part of the nationwide AMBER Alert system.	Murdered	3 weeks
September 11th, 1982	Carole Pappas	42	United States of America	Carole Pappas, the wife of former Major League Baseball pitcher Milt Pappas disappeared after leaving the couple's home in Wheaton, Illinois. In 1987, workers drained a pond four blocks from the Pappas' house and found her car with Carole's body inside. As Carole was a recovering alcoholic, police hypothesized that she may have been drinking and mistook a driveway into the pond as one leading to her neighborhood; coroners were not able to establish a BAC.	Drowned	5 years
September 25th, 1982	Lisa Ann Millican	13	United States of America	The first of two victims of Alvin and Judith Neelley. Millican was abducted from the Riverbend Mall in Rome, Georgia, on 25 September 1982. She was sexually assaulted by both individuals for 3 days before Judith injected her with drain cleaner in an attempt to kill her. When that failed Judith shot Millican in the back and dropped her body in Little River Canyon, Alabama. Judith Neelley then called police to report the location and they were able to find Millican's body on September 29th.	Murdered	4 days
October, 1982	Deborah Scaling Kiley	24	United States of America	Deborah Scaling Kiley was hired to sail the Trashman yacht and took sail sometime in October, 1982. During the voyage they experienced extreme weather off the coast of North Carolina, which caused the Trashman to sink. Kiley and four other crew members were able to escape from the yacht and reach a lifeboat; they were the only crew to survive the initial sinking. Over the following five days, three crew would perish; Kiley and her last surviving crew member were rescued by a cargo ship.	Found alive	5 days
November 15th, 1982	Don Kemp	35	United States of America	Kemp was a New York advertising executive who disappeared under mysterious circumstances in Wyoming, where he had planned to begin a new life. Kemp's vehicle was found abandoned and still running on an I-80 ramp 40 miles from the nearest town; authorities searched the area and while they were able to find some of his belongings they were unable to locate Kemp. In October, 1985, Kemp's remains were located not far from the original search area. Despite mysterious circumstances surrounding Kemp's disappearance, authorities concluded that Kemp disappeared of his own volition and died in the wilderness.	Died (unknown cause)	3 years
November 24th, 1982	Alisha Heinrich	1	United States of America	Alisha Heinrich and her mother, Gwendolyn Clemons, were last seen around November 24, 1982, in Kansas City, Missouri. Heinrich's body was recovered in Moss Point, Mississippi after nearly two weeks; she was a victim of homicide. She remained an unidentified decedent until 2020. Clemons' remains have never been recovered.	Murdered	38 years
November 26th, 1982	Lori Anne Razpotnik	15 or 16	United States of America	One of forty-nine known victims of serial killer Gary Ridgway. Razpotnik was last seen by her family in 1982 at age 15. She is believed to have been murdered by Ridgway in the spring or summer of the following year. Razpotnik remained unidentified until December 2023, when her body was identified via DNA analysis.	Murdered	41 years
December 19th, 1982	Steven Agan	23	United States of America	On 19 December 1982, Steven Agan was abducted and murdered by serial killer Larry Eyler. and was found dead in a woodland close to Indiana State Road 63.	Murdered	9 days

== 1983 ==
Date	Person(s)	Age	Country of disappearance	Circumstances	Outcome	Time spent missing or unconfirmed
January 24th, 1983	Ervin Dwayne Gibson	16	United States of America	Gibson was an Uptown teenager abducted and murdered by serial killer Larry Eyler on 24 January 1983. He was murdered in Lake County. Gibson's body was discovered on 15 April, but remained unidentified until November 1983.	Murdered	10 months
March 20th, 1983	Richard Wayne	17	United States of America	The teenager from Hendricks County, Indiana was abducted and murdered by serial killer Larry Eyler on March 20, 1983. Wayne's body was discovered on December 7.	Murdered	9 months
April 2nd, 1983	Michelle Marie Newton	3	United States of America	Newton was abducted at age 3 by her own mother, Debra Newton, on 2 April 1983, under the pretext of relocating ahead of a planned relocation with her father, Joseph Newton, to Jefferson County, Georgia, where he had found work. By the time Joseph arrived in Georgia Debra had disappeared with Michelle. The initial search for Michelle went on until 2000 when prosecutors were unable to reach Joseph. In 2016 a family member requested the case be reopened and following a further tip in 2025, Debra was arrested for kidnapping Michelle. Authorities were able to locate Michelle afterwards and inform her of her identity; she was reunited with her father Joseph on Thanksgiving, 2025.	Found alive	42 years
1983	Janet Lee Lucas	23	United States of America	A possible victim of serial killer Wayne Nance. Lucas was last seen alive in March 1983, and is believed to have died sometime that summer. Her body—shot twice in the head—was discovered in Missoula, Montana in September, 1985, but would not be identified until 2021.	Murdered	38 years
May 18th, 1983	Richard Edward Bruce Jr.	25	United States of America	Bruce was the fifteenth known victim of serial killer Larry Eyler. He was murdered on 18 May 1983 and his body was thrown from a bridge into a creek in Effingham, Illinois. Bruce's body was discovered by a trapper on 5 December, but remained unidentified until August 1994.	Murdered	11 years
May 28th, 1983	Michael Andrew "Mick" Riley	22	United States of America	Michael Andrew "Mick" Riley 22, disappeared from an Indianapolis nightclub on May 28, 1983, Riley's nude body was later found in a ditch in Hancock County, southeast of Greenfield, on June 5, 1983, after being murdered.	Murdered	1 week
May 29th, 1983	John Brandenburg Jr.	19	United States of America	Brandenburg was a Kentucky native murdered in Newton County, Indiana by serial killer Larry Eyler on or about May 29, 1983. According to Eyler, Brandenburg's murder was one of five of the twenty-two murders to which he posthumously confessed which he committed with his alleged accomplice Robert David Little. Brandenburg's body was found on October 19, 1983; his body was identified in April 2021.	Murdered	38 years
July 8th, 1983	Caroline Hogg	5	United Kingdom	Caroline Hogg disappeared while playing outside her home in the Edinburgh suburb of Portobello on 8 July 1983. A boy later revealed he had seen her walking away with an unknown man. The case received widespread media coverage across the UK. Her body was found many miles away in Leicestershire 10 days later. She had been abducted and murdered by paedophile and serial killer Robert Black.	Murdered	10 days
July 11th, 1983	Keith Bibbs	16	United States of America	Bibbs was a Chicago teenager murdered in Newton County, Indiana by serial killer Larry Eyler on or about Monday July 11, 1983. He was abducted while hitchhiking from Indiana to Illinois upon Indiana State Road 63 and driven to an abandoned farmhouse where he was duped into allowing himself to be bound to a wooden post, then blindfolded and gagged before he was stabbed multiple times in his upper and lower torso. His body was found on October 18, 1983, and identified in July 2023.	Murdered	40 years
August 30th, 1983	Ralph Calise	28	United States of America	On August 31, 1983, the body of Ralph Calise was discovered in a field near Illinois Route 60. He was identified as another victim of serial killer Larry Eyler.	Murdered	1 day
September 27, 1983	Eric Hansen	18	United States of America	Hanson's dismembered body was discovered in Kenosha County, Wisconsin, on October 4, 1983. He had last been seen alive on September 27. His murder remains unsolved but serial killer Larry Eyler is suspected.	Murdered	1 week
October 3rd, 1983	Andrea Scherpf	24	Canada	German tourists who vanished while hitchhiking near Chetwynd, Canada on October 3, 1983. Their bodies were found three days later, and both had been shot to death. A man was convicted of their murders in 1991, but later exonerated via DNA evidence in 2013.	Murdered	3 days
October 3rd, 1983	Bernd Göricke	27	Canada	German tourists who vanished while hitchhiking near Chetwynd, Canada on October 3, 1983. Their bodies were found three days later, and both had been shot to death. A man was convicted of their murders in 1991, but later exonerated via DNA evidence in 2013.	Murdered	3 days
October 10th, 1983	Heide Marie Villarreal-Fye	25	United States of America	25-year-old cocktail waitress Heide Marie Villarreal-Fye was last seen alive at a convenience store located off of West Main Street and Hobbs in League City, Texas on October 10, 1983. On April 4, 1984, Heidi's remains were discovered after a dog brought her skull to a nearby house in Calder Field on the 3000 block of Calder Road near League City. The medical examiner determined that Heidi had broken ribs and had been beaten with a club; she is believed to have died from blunt force trauma to the head.	Murdered	6 months
November 9th, 1983	Freddy Heineken	60	Netherlands	The Dutch businessman and chairman of Heineken N.V. was kidnapped together with his driver and held for ransom by a group of men. After paying the ransom of 35 million Dutch guilders, Heineken and his driver were released, and all of the kidnappers were eventually captured and served prison sentences for the crime.	Found alive	3 weeks
December 8th, 1983	Danny Katz	14	Israel	Israeli boy who was abducted by five Arab assailants while walking to a friend's house in Haifa on December 8, 1983. His body was found three days later, having been sexually assaulted, tortured and strangled. The five men were convicted and sentenced to life imprisonment, but there are allegations that they had been tortured into confessing.	Murdered	3 days

== 1984 ==
Date	Person(s)	Age	Country of disappearance	Circumstances	Outcome	Time spent missing or unconfirmed
1984	Kassim Ouma	6	Uganda	Kidnapped as a child to serve in the National Resistance Army. After leaving the army, Ouma took up boxing and is now a professional boxer, holding the IBF light middleweight title from 2004 to 2005.	Found alive	5 years
February, 1984	Hassan Jangju	16–17	Iraq	Iranian Basij operative who became the subject of a famous photograph taken by photographer Alfred Yaghobzadeh. He was killed during Operation Kheibar circa February 1984, and his remains were discovered and returned to Iran in 2017.	Killed in action	33 years
March 18th, 1984	Katsuhisa Ezaki	42	Japan	The president of the Ezaki Glico company was kidnapped by two masked men and then held for a ransom of 1 billion yen and 100 kg of gold bullion. However, Ezaki managed to escape three days later from the warehouse in Ibaraki.	Found alive	3 days
March 26th, 1984	George Crooks	28	United States of America	On March 26, 1984, in the U.S. state of Georgia, 28-year-old lawyer George Grant Crooks was murdered by his homosexual lover Robert Dale Conklin, who stabbed him to death with a screwdriver and dismembered the body; the body parts were discovered two days after the killing (as well as a day after Crooks was reported missing). Conklin was found guilty of the murder and sentenced to death. 21 years after the murder, Conklin was executed on July 12, 2005.	Murdered	1 day
April 6, 1984	Elizabeth Lamotte	17	United States of America	Elizabeth Lamotte disappeared from Manchester, New Hampshire on April 6, 1984. Her body was discovered in Tennessee a year later, but was not identified until 2018. Lamotte was possibly a victim of an unidentified serial killer.	Murdered	34 years
May, 1984	Benjamin Weir	61	Lebanon	American Presbyterian missionary who was abducted by Islamic Jihad militants from his Beirut, Lebanon home in May 1984. He was later released during the Iran-Contra affair in exchange for anti-tank weapons.	Found alive	16 months
May 15th, 1984	Luis de Lión	44	Guatemala	Guatemalan writer and leader of the Guatemalan Party of Labour who was abducted by Guatemalan Army soldiers from Guatemala City on May 15, 1984. His fate remained unknown until 1999, when his name and photograph appeared in an unsealed military document, indicating that he had been killed three weeks after his arrest.	Murdered	15 years
June, 1984	Ruth Waymire	24	United States of America	Waymire was last seen alive sometime in June, 1984, after leaving Spokane, WA, with her 2nd husband Travis Vaughn. On June 20th, 1984, a dismembered female body was found floating in the Spokane River, but was not able to be identified at the time. 14 years later a skull was be found in the Spokane area and police were able to link it to the torso but would not be linked to Waymire until DNA testing confirmed her identity in 2023. While Vaughn remains a suspect in Waymire's murder, he died in 2017 and her case is ongoing.	Murdered	38 years
June 1st, 1984	Mark Tildesley	7	United Kingdom	Mark Tildesley disappeared while visiting a funfair in Wokingham, Berkshire, England, on the evening of June 1, 1984. He was lured away from the fair and his bicycle was found chained to railings nearby. In 1990 it emerged that Tildesley had been abducted, drugged, tortured, raped and murdered by a London-based paedophile gang on the night he disappeared.	Murdered	Never found
July 18th, 1984	Danette Elg	31	United States of America	On July 18, 1984, Elg was murdered by a male acquaintance who broke into her house and murdered her by stabbing and slashing. Elg's mutilated body was found three days later in her home and the killer, Richard Leavitt, was arrested, convicted and sentenced to death for murdering Elg. Leavitt was executed in 2012.	Murdered	3 days
July 29th, 1984	Ellen Rae Simpson Beason	29	United States of America	29-year-old Ellen Rae Simpson Beason was last seen with friends sometime in July, 1984, at the Texas Moon Club in League City, Texas, where she met local construction worker Clyde Hedrick. Later that evening she told her friends that she and Hedrick had made plans to go swimming. Beason's decomposed remains were discovered underneath a sofa in a wooded area beside Old Causeway Road in Galveston County, Texas on July 29th, 1985. Though the medical examiner was initially unable to determine the cause of death, upon the exhumation of Beason's remains in 2012, it was ruled that she had suffered several severe skull fractures.	Murdered	1 year
August 28, 1984	Elisabeth Fritzl	18	Austria	Elisabeth Fritzl was lured by her own father, Joseph Fritzl, into a secret prison he had constructed in their basement where he kept her trapped for 24 years. In that time, Joseph repeatedly raped Elisabeth and forced her to birth several children who were also kept in the secret prison. Elisabeth and her children were finally discovered when Joseph took her daughter Kerstin to a hospital April 19th, 2008. Hospital staff found Joseph's reasoning for Kerstin's extreme condition suspicious and reported it to police. A week later Joseph allowed Elisabeth to see Kerstin in the hospital and Elisabeth was able to alert police to her ordeal.	Found alive	24 years
August 29th, 1984	Jonathan Wright	30	Lebanon	British journalist for Reuters who was kidnapped by a Palestinian splinter group in the Beqaa Valley, Lebanon. His kidnappers planned to trade him in exchange for three members who attempted to assassinate Israeli diplomat Shlomo Argov, but Wright managed to escape on September 16 through a ventilation hole. He was later picked up by a militia patrol and returned to Beirut.	Found alive	2 weeks
September, 1984	Marcella Cheri Bachmann	16	United States of America	Bachmann was a teenage runaway from Vancouver, Washington; she was last seen alive in September 1984. Her decomposed body was found on December 24, 1984 but was not identified until 2006. Wayne Nance is strongly suspected to be her murderer.	Murdered	22 years
September 10th, 1984	Laura Lynn Miller	16	United States of America	16-year-old Laura Lynn Miller was last seen alive on September 10, 1984, using a payphone to call her boyfriend at the same convenience store in League City, Texas where 25-year-old Heide Marie Villarreal-Fye was last seen a year earlier. Miller's remains were found on February 2, 1986, 60 feet from where police discovered Villarreal-Fye's remains.	Murdered	1 year
September 12th, 1984	Lisa Nichols	28	United States of America	The body of 28-year-old Lisa Nichols, a resident of West Virginia, was discovered along Interstate 40 near West Memphis, Arkansas on September 16, 1984. Her identity remained unknown until she was identified nine months later, in June 1985, through the use of fingerprints. Nichols is believed to be one of the first victims of the unsolved Redhead murders.	Murdered	9 months
September 17th, 1984	Vicki Lynne Hoskinson	8	United States of America	Vicki Lynne Hoskinson was a girl from Flowing Wells, Arizona, who disappeared on September 17, 1984, while riding her bike to mail a birthday card to her aunt. Her remains were found on April 12, 1985.	Murdered	7 months
October 3rd, 1984	Christine Jessop	9	Canada	Jessop went missing on 3 October 1984, and her body was found two months later, with signs of being raped and murdered. Jessop's next-door neighbour, Guy Paul Morin, was wrongfully convicted of the crime and his charges were all cleared after post-conviction DNA tests revealed that Morin was not the killer. A 2020 DNA testing identified another man as the real murderer based on DNA extracted from Jessop's underwear but the suspect, Calvin Hoover, died in 2015 due to suicide.	Murdered	2 months
November 4th, 1984	Bibi Lee	21	United States of America	On 4 November 1984, Lee was murdered by her boyfriend in Oakland, California. She was missing for a month until her body was found on 9 December 1984.	Murdered	1 month
November 17th, 1984	Yumi Hasebe	5	Japan	5-year-old Yumi Hasebe went missing from a pachinko parlor in Ashikaga, Tochigi. Her skeletized remains were found about a mile (1.7 km) from her home. Fukushima's case is considered to be one of the cases that make up the North Kanto Serial Young Girl Kidnapping and Murder Case.	Murdered	3 months
December 20, 1984	Jonelle Matthews	12	United States of America	Jonelle Matthews disappeared from Greeley, Colorado on December 20, 1984. Her remains were discovered on July 23, 2019, located about 15 mi (24 km) southeast of Jonelle's home. Steven Pankey was convicted of her murder in 2022.	Murdered	35 years

== 1985 ==
Date	Person(s)	Age	Country of disappearance	Circumstances	Outcome	Time spent missing or unconfirmed
ca. 1985	Espy Pilgrim	33	United States of America	Espy Pilgrim of North Carolina lost contact with her family sometime in the early to mid 1980s. Her body was discovered on April 1, 1985, in Kentucky, but her body remained unidentified until 2018.	Murdered	33 years
January 8th, 1985	Lawrence Jenco	51	Lebanon	American Catholic priest who was kidnapped by Islamist extremists in Beirut, Lebanon while working as a director of the Catholic Relief Services. After numerous negotiations, he was released and repatriated back to the U.S.	Found alive	18 months
February 7th, 1985	Kiki Camarena	37	Mexico	37-year-old Kiki Camarena, an American intelligence officer, was abducted by corrupt Mexican officials working for the major drug traffickers in Mexico on February 7, 1985. Camarena was subsequently taken to a residence in Guadalajara, owned by Mexican drug lord Rafael Caro Quintero, where he was tortured over a 30-hour period and murdered. Camarena's body was found wrapped in plastic in a rural area outside the small town of La Angostura on March 5, 1985.	Murdered	1 month
March 16th, 1985	Terry A. Anderson	38	Lebanon	American journalist for the Associated Press who was abducted by Islamic Jihad militants on March 16, 1985, from a street in Beirut, Lebanon. He was held hostage during the Lebanon hostage crisis, but was eventually released without harm on December 4, 1991.	Found alive	6 years
May 8th, 1985	Sipho Samuel Hashe	51	South Africa	Hashe, Galela, and Godolozi were South African anti-Apartheid activists who were, tortured and subsequently killed by members of the Bureau of State Security on May 8, 1985. Their fate remained unclear until November 11, 1997, when former Police Col. Gideon Nieuwoudt confessed that he and several others were responsible for their deaths.	Murdered	12 years
May 8th, 1985	Twasile Champion Galela	37	South Africa	Hashe, Galela, and Godolozi were South African anti-Apartheid activists who were, tortured and subsequently killed by members of the Bureau of State Security on May 8, 1985. Their fate remained unclear until November 11, 1997, when former Police Col. Gideon Nieuwoudt confessed that he and several others were responsible for their deaths.	Murdered	12 years
May 8th, 1985	Qaqawuli Godolozi	29	South Africa	Hashe, Galela, and Godolozi were South African anti-Apartheid activists who were, tortured and subsequently killed by members of the Bureau of State Security on May 8, 1985. Their fate remained unclear until November 11, 1997, when former Police Col. Gideon Nieuwoudt confessed that he and several others were responsible for their deaths.	Murdered	12 years
May 9th, 1985	Seamus Ruddy	32	France	A journalist from Newry, Northern Ireland was kidnapped on 9 May 1985 and his body was found on 6 May 2017.	Murdered	32 years
May 15th, 1985	Rima Danette Traxler	8	United States of America	Traxler was an eight-year-old schoolgirl who disappeared while walking home from St. Helen's Elementary School to her Longview home on 15 May 1985. She was declared legally dead in 1988. Her murderer, Joseph Kondro, confessed to Traxler's murder in a plea bargain to avoid the death penalty in 1999. Traxler's body has never been found.	Murdered	Never found
June, 1985	Carole Packman	40	United Kingdom	A British woman who disappeared from her home in Bournemouth, England in July 1985. Although her body has never been found, her husband, Russell Causley, was found guilty of her murder at a 2004 retrial.	Murdered	Never found
June 9th, 1985	Thomas Sutherland	52	Lebanon	Scottish-American academic who was kidnapped by Islamic Jihad militants from his home in Beirut, Lebanon on June 9, 1985, who had mistaken him for Calvin Plimpton. He was released years later, together with English author Terry Waite.	Found alive	6 years
August 5th, 1985	Jeanine Sigala	17	United States of America	Lois "Jeanine" Sigala was an American teenager who was last seen alive on August 5th, 1985, by Meloni Hereford, then girlfriend of serial killer Terry Childs. Hereford claimed Sigala had been living with them for a few months in their Capitola, CA. According to Hereford, on the 5th, Childs took Hereford and Sigala to Scotts Valley, threatening to kill them both, ulitmately killing Sigala, and forcing Hereford to cover it up.	Murdered	5 days
September 10th, 1985	Raymond Fife	12	United States of America	Raymond Fife, a 12-year-old Boy Scout, disappeared in Warren, Ohio, on September 10, 1985; he was last seen going outdoors to meet his friend. Fife's body was discovered more than four hours later at a wooded field behind a supermarket; he died from his injuries two days later. Timothy A. Combs and Danny Lee Hill were both arrested and convicted of raping and murdering Fife; Combs was sentenced to life in prison, while Hill was sentenced to death.	Found alive	4 hours
September 20th, 1985	Ellen Blau	21	United States of America	On September 20, 1985, 21-year-old Ellen Blau was abducted in Wichita Falls, Texas by serial killer Faryion Wardrip. Her body was found on October 10, 1985.	Murdered	3 weeks
October 1st, 1985	Michele Avila	17	United States of America	On October 1st, 1985, Avila left her Los Angeles home to meet with a friend from high school, Laura Doyle. She never returned, and three days later, her body was found along a stream in Angeles National Forest. The case went unsolved until July 1988, when her two friends, Karen Severson and Laura Doyle, were arrested and convicted for her murder. According to the prosecutors, the two girls suspected that Avila had slept with their boyfriends, and so, they lured her to the creek and drowned her there.	Murdered	3 days
December 29th, 1985	Alison Day	19	United Kingdom	British woman Alison Day went missing on her way to visit her boyfriend who worked next to Hackney Wick station. She was last seen getting off at the station, using a telephone box and then walking towards the nearby canal. Three weeks later her body was found in the canal. She had been raped and murdered by "The Railway Killers" John Duffy and David Mulcahy, who went on to murder two more women near stations in or around London in the following months.	Murdered	3 weeks

== 1986 ==
Date	Person(s)	Age	Country of disappearance	Circumstances	Outcome	Time spent missing or unconfirmed
1986	Bambi Woods	30 or 31	United States of America	An American former pornographic actress and exotic dancer best known for her appearance as the title character in the 1978 film Debbie Does Dallas. Woods disappeared in 1986, and rumors soon emerged she had died of a drug overdose. She was discovered alive and well in Des Moines, Iowa, in 2005, having severed all connections to her previous occupations and lifestyle.	Found alive	19 years
1986	Michael Allen "Mike" Glenn	29	United States of America	On August 15, 1986, the body of 29-year-old Michael Allen "Mike" Glenn, clad only in his underwear, was found in a ditch near Eaton, Ohio. He lived in a trailer on the outskirts of Indianapolis, IN, and while investigators were not able establish when exactly he went missing, Glenn's body would remain unidentified for 3 years until authorities ran a fingerprint scan. Authorities believe Glenn was a victim of the I-70 Strangler, attributed to serial killer Herb Baumeister, but his murder officially remains unsolved	Murdered	3 years
February 2nd, 1986	Anita Cobby	26	Australia	Cobby, a registered nurse and beauty pageant contestant, was kidnapped from Blacktown railway station after dinner at Sydney Hospital in Surry Hills, Australia. Her body was found two days later on a rural farm in Prospect, showing signs of being sexually assaulted prior to her death. Five men were later convicted of her murder, each sentenced to life imprisonment without parole.	Murdered	2 days
March 10th, 1986	Sarah Harper	10	United Kingdom	10-year-old child Sarah Harper disappeared from the Leeds suburb of Morley while walking to a shop 100 yards from her home to buy bread. The owner of the shop confirmed she had bought the bread, just before a "balding man" had entered the shop. A white Ford Transit van was seen in the area where she disappeared from. 24 days later her body was found 71 miles away in the River Trent near Nottingham. She had been abducted and murdered by paedophile serial killer Robert Black.	Murdered	3 weeks
April 8th, 1986	Jennifer Guinness	49	Ireland	Irish socialite and member of the Guinness family who was kidnapped and held for ransom in Dublin by career criminal John Cunningham, aided by his brother and two associates. She was later rescued, and her kidnappers were found guilty and sentenced.	Found alive	8 days
April 11th, 1986	Brian Keenan	36	United Kingdom	Northern Irish writer who was kidnapped by Islamic Jihad militants in Beirut, Lebanon on April 11, 1986. After being held in detention for 4 years, he was released following negotiations with the Irish government, and later wrote a book about his experience as a hostage.	Found alive	4 years
May 12th, 1986	Wanda Jean Mays	26	United States of America	Wanda Jean Mays disappeared after midnight on May 12, 1986, while staying with her aunt and uncle's home near Guntersville Lake, Alabama. In the morning, her aunt and uncle discovered her room empty and the window broken from the inside. In 2008, the FBI confirmed that remains found at the foot of a cliff 2 miles (3.2 km) from her relatives' home were Mays', and her death was ruled an accident.	Accidental death (Fall)	32 years
May 18th, 1986	Anne Lock	29	United Kingdom	29-year-old British woman Anne Lock caught the train home from work to Brookmans Park railway station and was never seen alive again. Lock was the third woman in 8 months to disappear near a railway station within a 25-mile radius of London. 9 weeks later her body was found on an embankment near Brookmans Park station. She and the other two women had been abducted and murdered by serial killers John Duffy and David Mulcahy, also known as "The Railway Killers".	Murdered	2 months
May 24th, 1986	Shelley Kathleen Sikes	19	United States of America	19-year-old Shelley Kathleen Sikes was last seen leaving her job as a waitress at Gaido's Seafood Restaurant on the beachfront in Galveston, Texas just before midnight on May 24, 1986. Sikes's car was found the next day, stuck in mud, blood-stained, and abandoned on the side of an Interstate 45 access road, south of the Galveston causeway. Though Sikes has never been found, Gerald Zwarst was convicted of aggravated kidnapping in connection with her disappearance and sentenced to life in prison.	Murdered	Never found
June 14th, 1986	Anthony "Tony the Ant" Spilotro	48	United States of America	American mobsters and brothers Anthony "Tony the Ant" Spilotro and Michael Spilotro had disappeared on June 14, 1986, from their Oak Park home. On June 22, 1986, both their bodies were found with only their undershorts on after being buried in a cornfield in the Willow Slough preserve near Enos, Indiana.	Murdered	8 days
June 14th, 1986	Michael Spilotro	41	United States of America	American mobsters and brothers Anthony "Tony the Ant" Spilotro and Michael Spilotro had disappeared on June 14, 1986, from their Oak Park home. On June 22, 1986, both their bodies were found with only their undershorts on after being buried in a cornfield in the Willow Slough preserve near Enos, Indiana.	Murdered	8 days
June 30th, 1986	Liliane Barrard	37	Pakistan	Married French couple Lilian and Maurice Barrard were famous climbers. They successfully climbed K2 in June 1986, but disappeared during the descent. One month later Liliane's body was found in a snow field at 17,500ft, while Maurice's body was not found on the mountain until 1998.	Accidental death (unknown cause)	1 month
June 30th, 1986	Maurice Barrard	45	Pakistan	Married French couple Lilian and Maurice Barrard were famous climbers. They successfully climbed K2 in June 1986, but disappeared during the descent. One month later Liliane's body was found in a snow field at 17,500ft, while Maurice's body was not found on the mountain until 1998.	Accidental death (unknown cause)	12 years
June 30th, 1986	Tanya Moore	31	United States of America	Moore and Rodriguez were two transgender friends working as prostitutes on Philadelphia's 13th street in 1986. The pair disappeared on June 30, 1986, after getting into the car of a couple of clients. On July 3, 1986, their mutilated and dismembered bodies were found burning at a baseball diamond in Middletown. Their murder remains unsolved.	Murdered	4 days
June 30th, 1986	Tina Rodriguez	27	United States of America	Moore and Rodriguez were two transgender friends working as prostitutes on Philadelphia's 13th street in 1986. The pair disappeared on June 30, 1986, after getting into the car of a couple of clients. On July 3, 1986, their mutilated and dismembered bodies were found burning at a baseball diamond in Middletown. Their murder remains unsolved.	Murdered	4 days
July 22nd, 1986	Sherry Ann Duncan	16	Thailand	Duncan was a Thai-American high school student who was abducted and killed after leaving her school in Bangkok on July 22, 1986, who was found a few days later in some wetlands. Four men were erroneously arrested and sentenced to death for her murder, but were acquitted in 1995, some of them posthumously. Duncan's murder remains unsolved	Murdered	3 days
July 25th, 1986	Alison Parrott	11	Canada	On July 25th, 1986, Parrott, an 11-year old Canadian girl, was lured from her Toronto home after receiving a phone call from a stranger claiming to be photographer taking pictures for her track-and-field team. Parrott's body was found 2 days later in King Mills Park, having been bound, raped, and murdered. 10 years later, Police were able link Francis Carl Roy as her murderer using DNA.	Murdered	2 days
July 31st, 1986	Dawn Ashworth	15	United Kingdom	15-year-old Dawn Ashworth did not return home after visiting a friends house in Narborough, Leicestershire, on 31 July 1986. Two days later her body was found nearby on a footpath called Ten Pound Lane. Her murder remained unsolved until 1988, when Colin Pitchfork, who was also found to have killed another 15-year-old in the same village in 1983, was convicted of her murder via DNA profiling, the first case to do so in the UK.	Murdered	2 days
August 19th, 1986	Samantha Knight	9	Australia	Samantha Knight was an Australian girl from Bondi who missing on August 19, 1986, and was never found. It was later discovered that she had been killed by serial child molester Michael Guider.	Murdered	Never found
October, 1986	Kimberly Maria McLean	17	United States of America	The future Lori Erica Ruff, McLean went missing after running away from her parents' home in the suburban area of Philadelphia in the fall of 1986. Over the following years of her life, she acquired the false identity of the deceased Becky Sue Turner, legally changed her name to Lori Erica Kennedy, and married into a wealthy family in Texas. Frequent quarrels over her mental instability, erratic behavior, and secretive past led to her suicide in 2010. Her true identity went undiscovered until 2016, when she was identified following a DNA test.	Died by suicide prior to identity being discovered	30 years
October 9th, 1986	Nicola Fellows	9	United Kingdom	Two nine-year-old girls who were reported missing from Brighton, England, on October 9, 1986. The next day they were found dead in Wild Park in what became known as the "Babes in the Wood" murders. The girls' murderer, pedophile Russell Bishop, was only convicted after 32 years and two trials in 2018, but not before he abducted and attempted to kill another local girl in 1990.	Murdered	1 day
October 9th, 1986	Karen Hadaway	9	United Kingdom	Two nine-year-old girls who were reported missing from Brighton, England, on October 9, 1986. The next day they were found dead in Wild Park in what became known as the "Babes in the Wood" murders. The girls' murderer, pedophile Russell Bishop, was only convicted after 32 years and two trials in 2018, but not before he abducted and attempted to kill another local girl in 1990.	Murdered	1 day
November 14th, 1986	Sylvie Aubert	22	France	One of several young women who disappeared or were abducted close to the A6 motorway around Mâcon, Chalon-sur-Saône and Montceau-les-Mines in France. Aubert disappeared after leaving her workplace in November 1986; her body was discovered in April the following year.	Murdered	5 months
November 25th, 1986	Josefina Rivera	25	United States of America	Rivera, first victim of murderer and serial rapist Gary M. Heidnik, was kidnapped on November 25th, 1986, and forced to assist in kidnapping and torturing the further five victims. On March 24th, 1987, Rivera was able to convince Heidnik to let her see her family, where instead she called the police who arrested Heidnik, along with his friend Cyril Brown, and were able to find and free the three other surviving women.	Found alive	4 months
November 28th, 1986	Sandra Lindsay	24	United States of America	Lindsay, second victim of Gary M. Heidnik, was kidnapped on Black Friday, 1986. After several months of rape and torture, on February 7th, 1987, Lindsay succumbed to exhaustion and suffocated while being hung by her arms. Heidnik attempted to dismember and dispose of her body but gave up part-way through; instead boiling her head, baking her ribs, and freezing the rest. Police found her remains after another kidnappee, Josefina Rivera, escaped and called the police.	Murdered	4 months
December 23rd, 1986	Lisa Thomas	19	United States of America	Thomas, third kidnappee of Gary M. Heidnik, was brought to Heidnik's house on the premise of sex before he strangled her into complying and brought her into his basement to join his other victims. Following months of rape and torture, Thomas and 2 further victims were found alive when Josefina Rivera escaped and called the police.	Found alive	3 months
1986	Cara Knott	20	United States of America	Cara Knott, a young American woman who disappeared from San Diego County, California on December 27, 1986. Her body was found the next day, having been beaten and strangled by on duty CHP officer Craig Alan Peyer.	Murdered	1 day

== 1987 ==
Date	Person(s)	Age	Country of disappearance	Circumstances	Outcome	Time spent missing or unconfirmed
1987	Brahim Dahane	22	Western Sahara	Sahrawi human rights activists who were detained by Moroccan security forces in 1987 for protesting against the MINURSO referendum. They were kept in various detention centers until their eventual release in 1991; both have continued their activism since.	Found alive	4 years
1987	Aminatou Haidar	21	Western Sahara	Sahrawi human rights activists who were detained by Moroccan security forces in 1987 for protesting against the MINURSO referendum. They were kept in various detention centers until their eventual release in 1991; both have continued their activism since.	Found alive	4 years
January 2nd, 1987	Deborah Dudley	23	United States of America	Dudley was kidnapped on January 2, 1987, and was murdered on March 19, 1987, by Gary M. Heidnik. He had electrocuted her to death before disposing of her body in the New Jersey Pine Barens.	Murdered	3 months
January 12th, 1987	Terry Waite	47	Lebanon	English humanitarian who was kidnapped by the Islamic Jihad Organization on January 12, 1987, while he was working as a hostage negotiator in Beirut, Lebanon. He was held in solitary confinement until November 18, 1991, when he was released without incident.	Found alive	4 years
January 13th, 1987	Roger Auque	31	Lebanon	French journalist, diplomat and war correspondent who was arrested by Hezbollah militants in Lebanon in January 1987, for spying on behalf of Israel. He was detained together with another French journalist, until both men were released in November of that year.	Found alive	10 months
January 18th, 1987	Jacqueline Askins	18	United States of America	Askins, Gary M. Heidnik's fifth kidnapping victim, was paid by Heidnik to accompany him for 30 minutes on January 18th, 1987. Heidnik brought Askins to his house where they played video games until he placed her in a headlock and brought her into his basement. Askins, along with Lisa Thomas and future victim Agnes Adams, would not be found until fellow kidnappee Josefina Rivera escaped in March, 1987, and called police.	Found alive	2 months
March 24th, 1987	Agnes Adams	24	United States of America	Adams, final kidnapping victim of Gary M. Heidnik, was picked up by Heidnik with assistance from his other victim Josefina Rivera on March 24th, 1987. After having sex with Adams he took her to his basement, after which Heidnik allowed Rivera to go out by herself with the promise of bringing another girl back to be placed in the basement as well. Rivera instead contacted police who arrested Heidnik and freed the living victims.	Found alive	1 day
May 1st, 1987	Suzanne Korcz	27	United States of America	27-year-old Suzanne Korcz disappeared on May 1, 1987, from a nightclub in Lockport, New York. Her body was found on September 5, 1995, at Niagara Falls and in 2004 serial killer Tommy Lynn Sells confessed to the crime.	Murdered	8 years
May 12th, 1987	Kandy Janell Kirtland	9	United States of America	9-year-old Kandy Janell Kirtland was last seen alive in Huntsville, Texas, on the afternoon of May 12, 1987. Kirtland was spotted talking to a man who had parked in her house's driveway after she was dropped off by bus. On May 22, an arrest warrant was issued for 44-year-old James Otto Earhart, who had visited Kirtland's home prior to her abduction. Earhart was arrested on May 26; Kirtland's remains were discovered later that day and identified as hers on May 28. Earhart was charged with and convicted of Kirtland's murder and sentenced to death; he was executed by lethal injection on August 11, 1999.	Murdered	2 weeks
June 19th, 1987	Heather West	16	United Kingdom	16-year-old Gloucester girl Heather West was last seen by her siblings on June 19th, 1987, after crying all night from a job rejection that would have allowed her to escape her abusive parents, Fred and Rose West. Although she was never reported missing by her parents, police began to investigate her disappearance after rumors of there being a "family joke" that the couple's daughter was "under the patio". The police were given a search warrant in 1994 to search the family home and found her body, before finding many other bodies buried at the property. Heather, and the other victims, had been killed by her parents.	Murdered	7 years
June 19th, 1987	Teresa Cormack	6	New Zealand	Cormack, a New Zealand schoolgirl, was abducted, raped, and killed while wandering around Napier on 19 June 1987. Her body was found under a tree 8 days later. Her killer, sex offender Jules Mikus, was initially suspected but could not be convicted until 15 years later when advancements in DNA profiling linked Mikus to the murder.	Murdered	1 week
June 23rd, 1987	Larry Wayne Pearson	20	United States of America	The final victim of serial killer Robert Berdella. Abducted on 23 June 1987, Pearson was killed on 5 August after enduring six weeks of captivity. His severed head was recovered from Berdella's property in April 1988.	Murdered	10 months
June 24th, 1987	Jermaine Allan Mann	1	Canada	Mann was a Canadian citizen kidnapped by his father, Allan Mann, on 24 June 1987, when he was 21 months old. He and his father lived under assumed identities in the United States. His true identity was revealed in 2018.	Found alive	31 years
July, 1987	Cam Lyman	54	United States of America	Lyman was a multimillionaire dog breeder from Westwood, Massachusetts who disappeared in the summer of 1987, having last spoken to his close friend George O'Neil on July 18th, 19th, or 20th. His body was found in a septic tank on his estate in Hopkinton, Rhode Island by the new owners of the house in December 1997.	Died (unknown cause)	10 years
September 15th, 1987	Tomoko Oosawa	8	Japan	8-year-old Tomoko Oosawa was last seen leaving her home in Ojima, Gunma (now Ota, Gunma) on 15 September 1987. Her partial remains were found on the banks of Tone River on November 27, 1988. Oosawa's case is considered to be one of the cases that make up the North Kanto Serial Young Girl Kidnapping and Murder Case.	Murdered	1 year
September 20th, 1987	Holly Glynn	21	United States of America	Holly Glynn was an American woman who died in Dana Point, California, on September 20, 1987, by committing suicide by jumping off a cliff. Lacking any ID or identifying marks/tattoos, Glynn remained as "Dana Point Jane Doe" until 2015, after several of her friends reported they believed the Doe was Glynn.	Suicide	28 years
October 8th, 1987	Shirley Banks	29	United Kingdom	British woman Shirley Banks mysteriously disappeared while shopping in Bristol on 8 October 1987. Three weeks later her Mini car was discovered, painted blue, in the garage of known rapist John Cannan, and her body was found on 3 April 1988 in "Dead Woman's Ditch" in the Quantock Hills. Cannan was convicted of her murder and of various other abductions, attempted abductions and rapes. Cannan is also the prime suspect in the much wider-known case of the disappearance of Suzy Lamplugh from Fulham, 28 July 1986, three days after he was released from prison in the same area. When Bank's car was discovered in Cannan's garage, it had been fitted with the false number plate "SLP 386S", believed to refer to Suzy Lamplugh and 1986, the year of her disappearance.	Murdered	6 months
November 20th, 1987	Steven Tuomi	25	United States of America	The second victim of serial killer Jeffrey Dahmer. A native of Ontonagon, Michigan, Tuomi was murdered in the Ambassador Hotel in Milwaukee. His body was dismembered within Dahmer's grandmother's West Allis residence. Dahmer confessed to Tuomi's murder shortly after his 1991 arrest.	Murdered	4 years
November 21st, 1987	Kathy Bonney	19	United States of America	Kathy Bonney was a 19-year-old Norfolk, Virginia, student murdered by her own father on November 21, 1987, in what he alleged was an argument within his vehicle. Her father shot her twenty-seven times and discarded her body close to a canal in North Carolina.	Murdered	1 day
November 23rd, 1987	Deanna Criswell	16	United States of America	Deanna Criswell disappeared on November 23, 1987, from Spokane, Washington. A body was found on November 25 two days later in Pima County, Arizona, but it was not identified as hers until February 11, 2015.	Murdered	27 years
November 27th, 1987	Sian Kingi	12	Australia	Sian Kingi, an Australian-born New Zealander schoolgirl, was abducted on November 27, 1987, from Noosa, Australia, by married couple Barrie John Watts and Valmae Faye Beck, who subsequently raped and killed her. Kingi's body was later discovered on December 3 near the Tinbeerweh Mountain State Forest. Both Watts and Beck were convicted in a much-publicized trial, Watts was sentenced to life imprisonment, and Beck to 14 1/2 years' imprisonment.	Murdered	1 week
December, 1987	Heidi Härö	19	Finland	19-year-old Heidi Härö disappeared in Mäntsälä in December 1987 after leaving a local bar and possibly hitching a ride. Her decomposed body was found five months later in a forest area in Pukkila with some of her clothes missing. Härö may have been a victim of the Hausjärvi Gravel Pit Murders.	Murdered	5 months
December 11th, 1987	Isabelle Laville	17	France	Isabelle Laville did not return home from college on December 11, 1987. In 2004, Michel Fourniret and Monique Olivier of Saint-Cyr-les-Colons, France, confessed that they had kidnapped Laville as she walked in the direction of her Saint-Georges-sur-Baulche home and brought her to their house where she was raped and killed before her body was dumped in a well in Bussy-en-Othe. Her remains were recovered from the well in July 2006.	Murdered	18 years

== 1988 ==
Date	Person(s)	Age	Country of disappearance	Circumstances	Outcome	Time spent missing or unconfirmed
January 16th, 1988	James Edward Doxtator	14	United States of America	The third victim of serial killer Jeffrey Dahmer and the first victim who, according to Dahmer, he murdered with malice aforethought. He was murdered at Dahmer's grandmother's West Allis residence and much of his body was subsequently disposed of in the trash. No remains were ever found. Dahmer confessed to murdering Doxtator following his 1991 arrest.	Murdered	3 years
January 18th, 1988	Andrés Pastrana Arango	34	Colombia	Colombian politician and then-Senator who was abducted on January 18, 1988, by the Medellín Cartel, who demanded that the government prevent the extradition of Pablo Escobar to the United States. Pastrana was rescued a week later, and continued with his political career.	Found alive	1 week
February 9th, 1988	Helen McCourt	22	United Kingdom	Insurance clerk who disappeared in Billinge, England, on February 9, 1988. While her body has never been recovered, local pub owner Ian Simms was convicted via DNA profiling, making it one of the few cases where a conviction has occurred without a body.	Murdered	1 year
February 17th, 1988	William R. Higgins	43	Lebanon	American USMC corporal who was abducted by a Hezbollah-linked terrorist group on February 17, 1988, while on a peacekeeping mission in Lebanon. Higgins was supposedly executed a few months after his capture, but his remains went unrecovered until 1991.	Murdered	3 years
March 26th, 1988	Lisa Marie Kimmell	18	United States of America	Kimmell disappeared while travelling to her parents home in Billings, Montana, with her body later found near the North Platte River in Casper, Wyoming. She had been bludgeoned and stabbed to death there. The case remained unsolved until 2002, when the perpetrator's DNA was matched to Dale Wayne Eaton. He was subsequently convicted of the murder and sentenced to death, but following a new trial it was commuted to life in prison	Murdered	8 days
April, 1988	Michael Henley Jr.	9	United States of America	Michael Henley was an American child from New Mexico who disappeared in April,1988, during a hunting trip with his father. Henley's family believed that he may have been kidnapped when a child resembling him was photographed restrained with another woman thought to be Tara Calico. Ultimately, Henley is believed to have perished in the Zuñi Mountains after wandering away from the campsite before a snow storm hit during the trip. His skeletal remains were found 7 miles from the site in 1990.	Died (exposure)	2 years
April 1st, 1988	April Tinsley	8	United States of America	Tinsley was playing with her friends on April 1st, 1988, in Fort Wayne, Indiana, when she was kidnapped after leaving to retrieve her umbrella. Her body was found in a ditch 3 days later but her killer would not be caught for over 30 years. The perpetrator, John D. Miller, is notable for leaving taunting graffiti and notes around town for years prior to being caught.	Murdered	3 days
April 12th, 1988	Farida Hammiche	30	France	The wife of a bank robber, Farida Hammiche went missing from her home in Vitry-sur-Seine in April 1988. Michel Fourniret and Monique Olivier confessed to having kidnapped and killed Hammiche to steal loot that Fourniret had hidden in Hammiche's home. Hammiche's body has not been found. In 2018, Fourniret was convicted of the murder of Hammiche, while Olivier was convicted of complicity.	Murdered	Never found
June 18th, 1988	Marie Wilks	22	United Kingdom	British woman who suddenly disappeared in sight of traffic while using an emergency phone on the hard shoulder of the M50 near Tewkesbury, Gloucestershire. While on the line to the operator she mysteriously stopped speaking and the operator could then only hear the sound of passing cars. Later, police found the phone dangling on its cord next to her broken down car. Two days later her body was found at the bottom of the Eastbound carriageway embankment three miles from her car. Although a man was convicted of her murder, he was later released on appeal.	Murdered	2 days
July 4th, 1988	Wojciech Pryczek	13	Poland	The first of four boys kidnapped and murdered by Polish serial killer Mariusz Trynkiewicz. Pryczek was last seen alive on July 4, 1988; he was strangled to death. Trynkiewicz was found guilty of murdering all four of his victims and sentenced to death. His sentence was later commuted to 25 years in jail.	Murdered	1 month
July 6th, 1988	Sarah Cherry	12	United States of America	On July 6, 1988, 12-year-old Sarah Cherry was abducted and murdered by Dennis Dechaine, who was sentenced to life in prison for the murder.	Murdered	2 days
July 8th, 1988	Marie-Angèle Domèce	18	France	Marie-Angèle Domèce, an 18-year-old disabled women, disappeared in Auxerre on 8 July 1988. In February 2018, French serial killer Michel Fourniret confessed to Domèce's murder. However, her body has yet to be located.	Murdered	Never found
September 8th, 1988	Janine Balding	21	Australia	Balding was abducted near Sutherland railway station in Sydney, Australia on September 8, 1988, by a gang of five homeless people who hijacked her car and drove to the M4 Motorway near Michinbury, where three of them raped her at knifepoint. She was then bound, gagged and carried off to a nearby paddock, where the three main culprits drowned her. Her body was found the same day, and the culprits arrested and sentenced to long imprisonment terms.	Murdered	1 day
September 9th, 1988	Jaclyn Dowaliby	7	United States of America	Jaclyn Dowaliby was last seen alive in her home in Midlothian, Illinois, in the late evening of September 9th, 1988. Five days later her body was found near a small wooded area in Blue Island, having been strangled. Her step-father, David Dowaliby, was initially convicted for her murder but it was later overturned and Jaclyn's case remains unsolved.	Murdered	5 days
September 11th, 1988	Melissa Ann Tremblay	11	United States of America	Melissa Ann Tremblay was an American girl who went missing on September 11, 1988, from Lawrence, Massachusetts and was found the next day after being killed and left on railroad tracks. In 2014, following DNA analysis advancements, investigators were able to narrow down DNA found on Tremblay's body to the McClendon family line but could not match an exact individual. A male in the McClendon family who was in the Massachusetts at the time of the murder was arrested but ultimately acquitted due to the vagueness of the DNA evidence.	Murdered	1 day
September 13th, 1988	Richard Evelyn Byrd III	68	United States of America	Richard Evelyn Byrd III was an Antarctic explorer and a United States naval officer who had gone missing on September 13, 1988, in Baltimore, Maryland, and was found dead on October 3, 1988.	Accidental death (Alzheimer's related complications)	3 weeks
September 23, 1988	Brenda Schaefer	36	United States of America	Schaefer was kidnapped on September 23, 1988, by her boyfriend Mel Ignatow and his ex-girlfriend Mary Ann Shore, who held her at the latter's house in Louisville, Kentucky. There, she was raped, tortured and finally killed by both abductors, who then buried her in Shore's backyard. More than a year later, the body was located, but Ignatow was acquitted in a controversial trial.	Murdered	1 year
October, 1988	Unnamed 14-year-old Native American girl	14	United States of America	In October 1988, serial rapist-kidnapper John Jamelske abducted his first victim, a 14-year-old Native American girl, whom he held captive for over two years. Jamelske compelled her to his will by threatening violence against her younger brother. The victim was 17 by the time Jamelske released her; she made no attempt to report to authorities after she was released.	Released	3 years
October, 1988	Stacy Lyn Chahorski	19	United States of America	The body of 19-year-old Stacy Lyn Chahorski was discovered along the east side of northbound I-59 near Rising Fawn in Dade County, Georgia, on December 16, 1988. Chahorski was not officially reported missing until January 1989; she had been last heard four months earlier via telephone, informing her mother that she planned to hitchhike back to her home in Michigan. Chahorski remained unidentified until March 2022. On September 6, 2022, Charhoski's killer was identified as Henry Frederick Wise, a truck driver and stunt driver who died in a car accident in South Carolina in 1999.	Murdered	33 years
November, 1988	Lolo Sono	21	South Africa	Sono and Shabalala were abducted and murdered in Soweto in November 1988. The pair were last seen alive by Sono's father, who saw his son's beaten face in a kombi van with Winnie Mandela. Their bodies would not be returned to their families until 2013.	Murdered	25 years
November, 1988	Siboniso Shabalala	19	South Africa	Sono and Shabalala were abducted and murdered in Soweto in November 1988. The pair were last seen alive by Sono's father, who saw his son's beaten face in a kombi van with Winnie Mandela. Their bodies would not be returned to their families until 2013.	Murdered	25 years
November 25th, 1988	Junko Furuta	17	Japan	Furuta, a Japanese high school student, was abducted in Misato, Saitama, Japan, by a gang of teenage boys while riding her bike home on November 25, 1988. Furuta was then repeatedly raped, tortured and finally murdered by her captors, who encased her body in concrete, with police finding it on March 29, 1989.	Murdered	4 months
December 21st, 1988	Kenyatta Odom	5	United States of America	The decomposed remains of five-year-old Kenyatta "KeKe" Odom were discovered in Millwood, Georgia, on December 21, 1988, though remained unidentified until November 2023, when Odom's mother, Evelyn, and Evelyn's boyfriend, Ulyster Sanders were indicted on multiple charges in connection with Odom's death, including felony murder.	Killed	34 years
December 21st, 1988	Venus Xtravaganza	23	United States of America	The body of transgender performer Venus Xtravaganza was found under a bed in a New York hotel on December 25, 1988, after going missing four days earlier. Xtravaganza had been strangled.	Murdered	4 days
December 29th, 1988	Stompie Seipei	14–15	South Africa	UDF activist kidnapped along with three other boys by a group of Winnie Mandela's bodyguards on December 29, 1988, after being accused of being a police informant. One of the men later killed him, slashing his throat.	Murdered	9 days

== 1989 ==
Date	Person(s)	Age	Country of disappearance	Circumstances	Outcome	Time spent missing or unconfirmed
January 14th, 1989	Paul Vanden Boeynants	70	Belgium	Belgian politician who served two separate terms as the country's prime minister. On January 14, 1989, he was kidnapped by members of Patrick Haemers's gang, who demanded a ransom in exchange for the safe return of Boeynants. The ransom was paid, but all the members were later captured.	Found alive	1 month
February 16th, 1989	Avi Sasportas	20	Israel	Israeli soldier who was abducted and subsequently killed by the newly founded Hamas on February 16, 1989. His murder, coupled with that of Ilan Saadon, caused a stir in Israel and subsequent manhunt and apprehension for the militants responsible.	Murdered	2 months
March 3rd, 1989	Kelly Ann Tinyes	13	United States of America	Tinyes was a thirteen-year-old Valley Stream, New York schoolgirl who was strangled, stabbed, and sexually mutilated in the home of a neighbor. Her killer, 21-year-old neighbor Robert Golub, was convicted of second-degree murder and sentenced to 25 years to life in prison.	Murdered	1 day
March 11th, 1989	Aundria Bowman	14	United States of America	Bowman disappeared under mysterious circumstances from her adoptive family's home in Hamilton, Michigan on March 11, 1989. Her adoptive father, Dennis Bowman, claimed that she had stolen money and then fled, and was thus classified as a runaway. More than three decades later, after Dennis was arrested for an unrelated murder in Virginia, he confessed that he had killed Aundria because she tried to escape being molested by him. He revealed the burial site in Monterey Township, near the family home, and Aundria's remains were subsequently recovered. The elder Bowman is due to stand trial for both murders he is accused of.	Murdered	31 years
March 11th, 1989	Mark Kilroy	21	Mexico	American tourist Mark Kilroy was kidnapped and murdered in a human sacrifice ritual by Adolfo Constanzo and his followers during Spring Break 1989 in Matamoros, Mexico.	Murdered	1 month
March 18th, 1989	Jeanne-Marie Desramault	21	France	Jeanne-Marie Desramault was dropped off at the gare de Charleville-Mézières on the morning of March 18, 1989, by a nun whose convent she was staying at, with plans to travel to Béthune to visit her parents. She never boarded the train and was not seen alive again. In 2004, Michel Fourniret and Monique Olivier confessed to kidnapping and killing Desramault, whose remains were found on July 3 that year, buried in the garden of a Donchery chateau formerly owned by the Fourniret couple.	Murdered	15 years
March 20th, 1989	Helén Nilsson	10	Sweden	Nilsson was abducted while she was out to meet some friends in Hörby, Sweden on March 20, 1989. She was kept alive for a few days before her captor killed her and dumped her body in the woods. The killer, Ulf Olsson, was identified and convicted of her killing in the early 2000s after his DNA linked him to the crime scene.	Murdered	6 days
April 8th, 1989	Urban Höglin	23	New Zealand	Urban Höglin and Heidi Paakkonen disappeared while tramping on the Coromandel Peninsula of New Zealand in April 1989. Fugitive offender David Wayne Tamihere was convicted of their murders in December 1990. Höglin's body was discovered in October 1991, while Paakkonen's body has not been found.	Murdered	2 years
April 8th, 1989	Heidi Paakkonen	21	New Zealand	Urban Höglin and Heidi Paakkonen disappeared while tramping on the Coromandel Peninsula of New Zealand in April 1989. Fugitive offender David Wayne Tamihere was convicted of their murders in December 1990. Höglin's body was discovered in October 1991, while Paakkonen's body has not been found.	Murdered	Never found
May 3rd, 1989	Ilan Saadon	19	Israel	Israeli soldier who vanished mysteriously while hitchhiking back home on May 3, 1989. Large searches were organized to locate his remains, which were found on August 11, 1996. It was determined that Saadon had been killed by the then-newly formed Hamas, and his murder, coupled with that of Avi Sasportas, caused a stir in Israel and subsequent manhunt and apprehension for the militants responsible.	Murdered	7 years
May 13th, 1989	Jackie Mann	75	Lebanon	British RAF fighter pilot who was abducted in Beirut, Lebanon on May 13, 1989, by a Hezbollah-linked insurgent cell. Mann was held in detention for two years, as his kidnappers demanded the release of Palestinian prisoners, until he was released without incident on September 24, 1991.	Found alive	2 years
May 25th, 1989	Cindy James	44	Canada	James, a Vancouver, British Columbia nurse with a history of mental illness, had reported being stalked and harassed for seven years, sometimes to the point of vandalism of her home and physical assault. Police were unable to find any evidence that someone else had been involved during that time, despite spending almost C$1.5 million. On May 25, 1989, she disappeared after a shopping trip at a local grocery. Her tied-up body was found in the backyard of an abandoned house in Richmond, with what an autopsy later found was excessive amounts of morphine, diazepam and other drugs in her system. A lengthy inquest concluded that while the drug overdoses had caused her death, the manner—suicide, homicide or accident—could not be determined.	Died (drug overdose)	14 days
June 29th, 1989	Peter Dixon	51	United Kingdom	Couple Peter and Gwenda Dixon failed to return home after going on one last walk on the Pembrokeshire coast on June 29, 1989, whilst on holiday. Ten days later their bodies were found in undergrowth next to the nearby cliff path. They had been robbed and then shot dead at point-blank range with a shotgun by psychopathic Pembrokeshire burglar and serial killer John Cooper.	Murdered	10 days
June 29th, 1989	Gwenda Dixon	52	United Kingdom	Couple Peter and Gwenda Dixon failed to return home after going on one last walk on the Pembrokeshire coast on June 29, 1989, whilst on holiday. Ten days later their bodies were found in undergrowth next to the nearby cliff path. They had been robbed and then shot dead at point-blank range with a shotgun by psychopathic Pembrokeshire burglar and serial killer John Cooper.	Murdered	10 days
August 9th, 1989	Duncan MacPherson	23	Austria	Duncan MacPherson was a Canadian professional ice hockey player who disappeared 9 August 1989 when he went on a trip to Austria. In 2003 his body was found on a mountain where he had gone snowboarding and his death cause is unknown.	Died (undetermined cause)	14 years
September, 1989	Donna Sue Nelton	28	United States of America	The body of 28-year-old Donna Sue Nelton was found eight miles west of Decatur, Arkansas off of Highway 102 in Rogers, Arkansas on May 7, 1990. She had been shot, set on fire, and possibly run over with a vehicle. Nelton remained unidentified until October 25, 2022; she had last been seen alive in the fall of 1989. Her boyfriend, George Alvin Bruton, was suspected in her murder; Bruton died in prison in 2008.	Murdered	33 years
October 2nd, 1989	Liang Shan Shan	17	Singapore	A Malaysian teenager who went missing after leaving her school on October 2, 1989. Her body was discovered on October 14 in Yishun Industrial Park. Although no official cause of death was determined, her death was classified as murder. The prime suspect in her murder, Oh Laye Koh, was initially acquitted of her murder, but eventually found guilty following a retrial. Oh was sentenced to death and hanged at Changi Prison in May 1995.	Murdered	12 days
October 22nd, 1989	Jacob Wetterling	11	United States of America	Jacob Wetterling was abducted on October 22, 1989, by a masked gunman while cycling home in the dark with his brother and a friend after going to rent a video from a convenience store in St. Joseph, Minnesota. His remains were found on September 1, 2016, when Danny Heinrich, already serving time on child pornography charges, led police to them.	Murdered	29 years
October 27th, 1989	Amy Mihaljevic	10	United States of America	Amy Mihaljevic, an American elementary school student, was kidnapped and murdered in Bay Village, Ohio, on October 27, 1989. Her body was found on February 8, 1990, in a field off a rural road in Ashland County. While her murder remains unsolved the case is very active, with updates as recent as 2021.	Murdered	3 months
November, 1989	Patricia Candace Walsh	23	United States of America	Walsh and Zyskowski, a married couple from Seattle, Washington, disappeared shortly after leaving the city in November 1989. Zyskowski's remains were discovered in January 1990 in Ozona, Texas, and identified in 1992; Walsh's body was discovered by deer hunters in Millard County, Utah, on October 26, 1990 and identified in May, 2003. Serial killer Robert Ben Rhoades admitted to their murders.	Murdered	14 years
November, 1989	Douglas Scott Zyskowski	26	United States of America	Walsh and Zyskowski, a married couple from Seattle, Washington, disappeared shortly after leaving the city in November 1989. Zyskowski's remains were discovered in January 1990 in Ozona, Texas, and identified in 1992; Walsh's body was discovered by deer hunters in Millard County, Utah, on October 26, 1990 and identified in May, 2003. Serial killer Robert Ben Rhoades admitted to their murders.	Murdered	3 years
November 5th, 1989	Tsutsumi Sakamoto	33	Japan	Tsutsumi Sakamoto, a lawyer working on a lawsuit against the cult Aum Shinrikyo, was kidnapped and murdered by members of the cult along with his wife and 14-month-old son on November 5, 1989. Their bodies were dumped in three different areas of Japan in order for police to not link their cases. Their disappearance was not linked to the cult at first, but was uncovered following the cult's attack on the Tokyo subway in 1995, and their bodies were found in September 1995.	Murdered	6 years
November 5th, 1989	Satoko Sakamoto	29	Japan	Tsutsumi Sakamoto, a lawyer working on a lawsuit against the cult Aum Shinrikyo, was kidnapped and murdered by members of the cult along with his wife and 14-month-old son on November 5, 1989. Their bodies were dumped in three different areas of Japan in order for police to not link their cases. Their disappearance was not linked to the cult at first, but was uncovered following the cult's attack on the Tokyo subway in 1995, and their bodies were found in September 1995.	Murdered	6 years
November 5th, 1989	Tatsuhiko Sakamoto	1	Japan	Tsutsumi Sakamoto, a lawyer working on a lawsuit against the cult Aum Shinrikyo, was kidnapped and murdered by members of the cult along with his wife and 14-month-old son on November 5, 1989. Their bodies were dumped in three different areas of Japan in order for police to not link their cases. Their disappearance was not linked to the cult at first, but was uncovered following the cult's attack on the Tokyo subway in 1995, and their bodies were found in September 1995.	Murdered	6 years
November 30th, 1989	Richard Charles Mallory	51	United States of America	Mallory went missing in November, 1989, after soliciting Aileen Wuornos for sexual services and driving her to an abandoned area. Mallory's vehicle was discovered 2 days later, while his body was discovered 2 weeks later.	Murdered	2 weeks
December 20th, 1989	Elisabeth Brichet	12	Belgium	Elisabeth Brichet left her friend's house in Namur, Belgium, on the evening of December 20, 1989, and did not arrive home. In 1996, her mother helped organise the White March in honour of Belgium's missing and murdered children following the arrest of Marc Dutroux. On July 3, 2004, the girl's remains were found buried in the garden of a Donchery chateau which formerly belonged to Michel Fourniret and Monique Olivier.	Murdered	14 years
