= Henry McKay =

Henry McKay may refer to:

- Henry McKay (politician) (1925–1987), Canadian lawyer
- Henry McKay (cricketer) (1883–1926), Australian cricketer
- Henry D. McKay (1899–1960), American sociologist

== See also ==
- Harry McKay (disambiguation)
