= Harry McKay (disambiguation) =

Harry McKay (born 1997) is an Australian rules footballer.

Harry, Harold or Harrison McKay or MacKay may also refer to:

- Harry McKay (politician) (1925–1987), Canadian politician and judge
- Harold MacKay (born 1940), Canadian lawyer and corporate director.

== See also ==
- Henry McKay (disambiguation)
