= John Henry Guinness =

Irish banker (1935–1988)

- Born: 10 April 1935
- Died: 25 February 1988 (aged 52)
- Education: Eton College
- Occupation: Banker

John Henry Guinness (10 April 1935 – 29 February 1988) was a son of Henry Eustace Guinness and was chairman of Guinness Mahon.

Educated at Eton College, he attained the rank of officer in the Royal Navy. Later, he was named a director of Guinness Peat Group and served as chairman of Guinness and Mahon merchant bank. He married English-born Mary Jennifer Hollwey. They had three children: Ian Richard Guinness (b. 15 March 1961), Gillian Sarah Guinness (b. 8 July 1962) and Tania Caroline Guinness (b. 10 February 1966).

== Guinness Kidnapping ==
In 1986, he was pistol-whipped during his wife's kidnapping. She was rescued by Garda Síochána later that month.
