= Murder of Marlene Oakes =

American murder case

Marlene Oakes
- Undated photograph of Marlene Oakes
- Born: Helen Marlene Oakes; December 7, 1954
- Died: October 11, 1980 (aged 25); Verona, Kentucky
- Cause of death: Homicide by firearm
- Body discovered: November 29, 1981
- Other name: Marlene Major
- Citizenship: United States
- Known for: Murder victim
- Children: 2

Helen Marlene Major (née Oakes; December 7, 1954 – October 11, 1980), best known by her middle name and posthumously by her maiden name, was an American woman who was murdered by her estranged husband, William Alexander Major, in 1980. The victim's partial skull was located near the pair's home not long after her death, but it was not identified until 2001 after mitochondrial DNA testing confirmed the identity of the remains.

== Background ==
Oakes was known to have had an affair with a man named Glen St. Hillaire, a mutual acquaintance of her and her husband, William "Bill" Major; St. Hillaire was also employed, for a time, by Bill Major. The couple had met the man after his truck had broken down, while driving from Ohio to Texas. St. Hillaire later moved into a mobile home on the couple's property, and he and Oakes grew quite close during that time; Bill Major allegedly "encouraged" the relationship, suspiciously. The couple had been married for nine years, but Bill Major himself was also rumored to be involved with another woman. They had two children, Donald and LaLana.

"I know what I saw. [...] I told him not to touch me ever again and if he touches Donald, I'll kill him. [...] I could be the biggest whore to walk the streets of Verona and no judge would dare to give him custody of my kids before me." — Marlene's entry in her diary after discovering her husband abusing their son.

Oakes, who kept a diary, wrote how (around the time of her murder) she had witnessed her husband sexually assaulting their son, Donald. In fact, Bill Major had previously been convicted of molesting two boys, in 1975. Oakes then made plans to take her son and daughter from the household and flee.

Major reportedly told several individuals that he would murder Oakes if she was to end their relationship, and went into detail of the steps he would take to make her body unidentifiable. Oakes had personally given St. Hillaire her diaries to ensure their survival. Additionally, she had written that Major had agreed to sign divorce papers, provided that the abuse of their son was not made public. Oakes wrote that if he changed his mind, she would tell her mother-in-law. She also informed her sister about her plans for divorce and about Major's abuse toward Donald.

== Disappearance and murder ==
On October 11, 1980, Oakes and Major had an argument and St. Hillaire left the property to "cool off". When he returned around midnight, the home was in disarray. Major had dropped the two children off at a neighbor's residence but claimed to St. Hillaire that Oakes had left and abducted the children. He gave several firearms to another neighbor and expressed the desire to move back to his native Rhode Island. St. Hillaire learned about Major's lies two days later and knew that Oakes would not have abandoned her children willingly and alerted police.

There was no evidence Oakes had taken anything with her, except for her vehicle (now believed to have been disposed of in the Ohio River), yet her drivers license was left at the residence. Major told Donald and LaLana that their mother had abandoned them due to involvement with drugs, alcohol and prostitution. Authorities initially found the suggestion that Oakes left due to an unsatisfactory marriage somewhat plausible but searched the property with no results. At the time, they did acknowledge the details she listed in her diary to be a motive for her disappearance, but no signs of foul play were found in the couple's trailer. The diary itself was not considered strong enough evidence for a murder charge. Her dental records were frequently submitted to respective agencies whenever a woman's body matching her description was found.

St. Hillaire and Major denied to police any involvement in the disappearance of Oakes. Detectives asked Major to take a polygraph test, but he refused and moved to Pawtucket, Rhode Island with his son and daughter. While at work, he often brought one of the children with him and abused them often during employment.

A partial skull, lacking teeth, was discovered a mile from the Major residence by a hunter on November 29, 1981, but would not be identified for years after its discovery. The cause of death was determined to be due to multiple gunshots and through examination the victim was determined to be a white female around 30 years old. Evidence of dismemberment was also noted. At the time, dental records were the primary means of identifying skeletal remains, yet the skull lacked teeth and could not be identified, despite early speculation it belonged to Marlene Oakes. Eventually, traditional nuclear DNA testing was determined impossible due to the deteriorated condition of the bone.

Major remarried in 1981. His second wife Pauline reported the sexual and physical abuse to police in 1984 after his children told her that he had threatened to kill the other sibling if one was to report him. Days after being confronted, he threatened LaLana at gunpoint to "keep her mouth shut." He was arrested and convicted in 1985. He served 11 years of a 15-year sentence. Donald and LaLana moved in with their maternal grandmother (Oakes' mother) following the conviction.

After his release in 1996, he was set to face additional charges from Kentucky officials but due to the statute of limitations and "insufficient evidence", further action was not possible. Two additional boys were confirmed to have been sexually assaulted by Bill Major.

Oakes' mother immediately suspected Major for the disappearance. After gaining custody, she told LaLana she presumed Oakes had been dead since her disappearance. LaLana eventually confronted her father and asked where Oakes' remains were, stating she would not seek legal action as long as her mother would get a proper burial. He responded with "if you think I'm going to tell you where your mother is buried, you're crazy."

She later took the initiative to investigate "on her own" and began building knowledge by watching true crime documentaries. When she was 20 years old, Boone County police gave her access to their file on Oakes' case, and she began interviewing witnesses. She also searched for additional remains but was unable to find any.

== Identification and conviction ==
In 2001, LaLana submitted DNA for a mitochondrial DNA test to be compared to that of the unidentified skull. The type of DNA was easier to obtain but less specific in genetic information. The county initially declined to pay for the nearly $20,000 test but eventually reversed that decision. Oakes' sister had previously offered to sacrifice her retirement funds to pay for it. The testing concluded that LaLana was maternally related to the individual the skull belonged to.

Major's father told authorities that he had confessed to him about the murder while in prison, which disgusted him. This statement was insufficient on its own, as the prison did not record phone calls from inmates and there was "significant" animosity between the two men.

In March 2000, Major's father allowed police to tap his telephone as he made a call to Major, who admitted guilt in the crime. Major was promptly arrested. He later confessed to police and stated he felt no remorse. Major's defense stated a stroke he suffered in 1995 caused him to be "delusional". Major was charged formally in July 2001.

The jury deliberated a mere forty-three minutes before releasing a guilty verdict after his trial concluded on July 28, 2003. He was sentenced to life in prison. However, this conviction was reversed upon appeal and he was retried. He was convicted again and received the same sentence.

== In popular culture ==
- Cold Case Files detailed the case in a 2001 episode titled "Daddy Knows Best".
- Forensic Files also depicted the case in a 2004 episode titled "A Daughter's Journey".
- My Favorite Murder discussed the case in a 2019 episode titled "Live at the W.L. Lyons Brown Theater in Louisville"

== See also ==
- List of solved missing person cases (1980s)
