= Kidnapping of Michelle Marie Newton =

American woman abducted as a child by her own mother

Michelle Marie Newton
- Born: October 5, 1979 (age 47); Louisville, Kentucky, U.S.
- Disappeared: April 2, 1983 (age 3)
- Status: Missing for 42 years, 7 months and 23 days; found by authorities in Marion County, Florida, on November 24, 2025, following a tip-off

Michelle Marie Newton (born October 5, 1979) is an American woman who was abducted as a child by her own mother, with both having been missing for 42 years. Her mother, Debra Newton, was arrested by authorities on November 24, 2025, in Marion County, Florida, following a Crime Stoppers tip. Michelle, who by that time had been located by law enforcement authorities, was then notified of her actual identity and has since been reunited with her father, Joseph Newton.

== Abduction and search ==
Newton was born on October 5, 1979, to Joseph and Debra Newton in Louisville, Kentucky. In the spring of 1983, when Newton was aged 3, Debra told Joseph that she wanted to relocate to Georgia under the pretext of "having found work" there. Joseph agreed to relocate there, but on April 2, 1983, Debra left for Georgia with Newton under the pretext of "preparing the family home" there. When Joseph followed them to Georgia several weeks later, they had already vanished, and would remain unable to be located for the next 42 years.

A nationwide search ensued, and a Jefferson County court issued a custodial interference indictment warrant against Debra. Joseph's last communication with Debra was between 1984 and 1985, after which her trail went cold. The search continued until 2000, when the court dismissed the case after prosecutors were unable to reach Joseph. For a time, Debra was on the Federal Bureau of Investigation's Top 8 Most Wanted List for parental kidnapping fugitives. In 2005, Newton – who would have been in her 20s by that time – was removed from the National Center for Missing & Exploited Children (NCMEC)'s database and Debra's warrant for custodial interference was recalled due to "inaccurate information".

== Discovery and rescue ==
In 2016, the case was reopened after a family member asked authorities to re-examine the case, and Debra was re-indicted on custodial interference charges. However, authorities still had no leads on the case. In 2024, the NCMEC released an age-progressed image of Newton, then aged 45, in hopes of getting leads in the case. In 2025, a Crime Stoppers tip led authorities to information regarding a woman living in Florida named "Sharon Nealy" who might be Debra. A US Marshals Task Force detective compared a recent photo of the woman to a 1983 image of Debra, and a Jefferson County detective "confirmed the resemblance". Authorities also collected DNA from Debra's sister in Louisville, and it showed a 99.9% match to the woman in Florida, who is, in fact, Debra – and had been living in Florida under a different name.

On November 24, 2025, authorities arrested Debra at the driveway of her home in The Villages, a retirement community in Marion County where she had been living with her unsuspecting husband. Bodycam footage from the arrest showed a friend of Debra joking, "They're coming for you, Sharon!" Debra laughed it off and told her friend that they're after Debra's husband, Reggie, but one of the deputies plainly stated that they were, in fact, "here for you, ma'am."

== Aftermath ==
Newton has since been reunited with her father, Joseph, in Louisville on Thanksgiving 2025. Meanwhile, Debra appeared in person for her indictment and arraignment at a Jefferson County court. Both Newton and her father were present. She was released on a bond posted by a relative. She pled guilty, was sentenced to 12 months, but the 12 months were deferred pending good behavior.

== See also ==
- List of solved missing person cases (1980s)
