= Faint hope clause =

Canadian parole provision

The "faint hope clause" is the popular name for s.745.6 of the Canadian Criminal Code, a statutory provision that allows prisoners who have been sentenced to life imprisonment with a parole eligibility period of greater than 15 years to apply for early parole once they have served 15 years. Offenders who committed their offence after December 2, 2011 are no longer eligible to apply for the faint hope clause. However, those convicted of offences that occurred prior to that date may still be eligible.

== Process ==
The prisoner must apply to the Chief Justice of the province where he or she was convicted, and the Chief Justice (or another designated judge) then reviews the application to determine whether there is a reasonable chance the prisoner could be successful in his or her application before a jury; if the applicant is likely to succeed, the court will empanel a jury to hear the application.

The jury may hear evidence relating to the character of the prisoner, the prisoner's conduct while in prison, the nature of the offence, the effect of the crime on the family of the victim, and other information the presiding judge deems relevant.

The jury then decides whether the parole eligibility period should be reduced, and the decision to reduce the parole eligibility period must be unanimous. If the parole eligibility period is reduced, this "permits the prisoner to apply for" early parole, and the ultimate decision of whether to grant parole to the prisoner lies with the Parole Board of Canada.

== History ==
The section was added in 1976 after Canada abolished the death penalty and replaced it with a mandatory sentence of life imprisonment for first and second degree murder. The clause was added in order to encourage convicted murderers in Canada to rehabilitate themselves, and to reflect the fact that other countries allowed convicted murderers to be paroled after an average of 15 years incarceration. Part of the reason for the clause was to reduce the risk of violence towards prison guards from prisoners serving life sentences and nothing to lose from committing further crimes inside prison.

Judicial Reviews began in 1987. As of October 10, 2010, 1,508 offenders were eligible to apply for a judicial review. Of those eligible, there have been 181 court decisions, and 146 of these have resulted in an offender becoming eligible for earlier parole. Of these, 135 offenders have been granted parole.

The Government of Canada under Prime Minister Stephen Harper, elected in January 2006, pledged during the election campaign to repeal the clause for all offenders.

In August 2006, the Canadian Minister of Justice, Vic Toews, re-affirmed this commitment, stating that he would introduce legislation in the fall of 2006 to repeal the Faint Hope Clause. In June 2009, the Conservative Government introduced Bill C-36 to abolish the faint hope clause.

In November 2009, the bill passed the House of Commons and was referred to the Senate. The Justice Minister, Rob Nicholson, stated that "[b]y ending faint hope reviews, we are saying no to early parole for murderers." However, the bill died on the order paper in the Senate on December 30, 2009, when Governor General Michaëlle Jean prorogued parliament on the advice of Prime Minister Stephen Harper.

The same Bill was again reintroduced by the government in the Senate (Bill S-6) during following session of parliament in spring, 2010. After some delay that bill was passed by Parliament and given Royal Assent in March 2011. It came into force in December of that year. The faint hope clause is no longer available for any offences committed after December 2, 2011.

Persons convicted of multiple murders that occurred after January 9, 1997 are ineligible to apply for a reduction in their parole eligibility period. This repeal occurred after convicted serial killer and rapist Clifford Olson unsuccessfully applied for release under the faint hope clause.

== See also ==
- Criminal sentencing in Canada
