= Clifford Olson =

Canadian serial killer (1940–2011)

- Born: Clifford Robert Olson Jr. January 1, 1940; Vancouver, British Columbia, Canada
- Died: September 30, 2011 (aged 71); Laval, Quebec, Canada
- Other name: The Beast of British Columbia
- Status: Died in hospital while in prison custody
- Conviction: Murder (11 counts)
- Penalty: Life imprisonment

Details
- Victims: 11
- Span of crimes: 1980–1981
- Country: Canada
- Date apprehended: August 12, 1981

Clifford Robert Olson Jr. (January 1, 1940 – September 30, 2011) was a Canadian convicted serial killer who confessed to murdering 11 children, aged between 9 and 18, in the early 1980s.

In 1976, Olson was serving a sentence for his crimes as a con artist. He had obtained favourable terms for himself by acting as an informant against a cellmate, even coaxing him into a written confession. However, Olson said it was discussions with his cellmate that led to his sexual interest in children and murderous intents.

== Murders ==
Christine Weller, 12, from Surrey, British Columbia, was abducted on November 17, 1980. Her body was found more than a month later on Christmas Day; she had been strangled with a belt and stabbed repeatedly. On April 16, 1981, Colleen Marian Daignault, 13, vanished. Five months later her body was found. On April 22, 1981, Daryn Todd Johnsrude, 16, was abducted and killed; his body was found less than two weeks later. On May 19, 1981, 16-year-old Sandra Wolfsteiner was kidnapped and murdered, and 13-year-old Ada Anita Court was murdered in June 1981.

Six victims followed in quick succession in July 1981. Simon Partington, nine, was abducted, raped and strangled on July 2, 1981. Judy Kozma, a 14-year-old from New Westminster, was raped and strangled a week later. Her body was discovered on July 25 near Weaver Lake. The next victims were Raymond King II, 15, abducted on July 23, raped and bludgeoned to death; Sigrun Arnd, an 18-year-old German tourist, raped and bludgeoned two days later; Terri Lyn Carson, 15, raped and strangled on July 27; and Louise Chartrand, age 17, the last victim identified, who died on July 30.

== Arrest and plea bargain ==
Olson, who had an extensive criminal history, was arrested on August 12, 1981, on suspicion of attempting to abduct two girls. By August 25, Olson had been charged with the murder of Judy Kozma. He reached a controversial deal with authorities, agreeing to confess to the 11 murders and show the RCMP the location of the bodies of those not yet recovered. In return, authorities agreed that C$10,000 for each victim would be paid into a trust for his wife and then-infant. His wife received C$100,000 after Olson cooperated with the RCMP, the 11th body being a "freebie". In January 1982, Olson pleaded guilty to 11 counts of murder and was given concurrent life sentences to be served in Canada's super-maximum security Special Handling Unit in Sainte-Anne-des-Plaines, Quebec, which houses many of the country's most dangerous criminals.

Olson scored 38/40 on the Psychopathy Checklist according to forensic psychiatrist Stanley Semrau, who interviewed Olson at length in prison.

In 1983 Gordon Taylor introduced a private member's bill in the House of Commons of Canada mandating Olson's execution, notwithstanding his 1982 sentence and Canada's 1976 abolition of capital punishment for murder. Numerous petitions supporting the bill were laid before the house, before it was ruled out of order in 1984 as a bill of attainder.

== Parole application ==
At his sentencing January 14, 1982, Justice McKay, the trial judge remarked, "My considered opinion is that you should never be granted parole for the remainder of your days. It would be foolhardy to let you at large."

In 1997, Olson was denied parole, for which he applied under Canada's "faint hope clause", which allowed a parole hearing for convicted murderers who had served at least 15 years.

Canadian law allows inmates convicted of first-degree murder to apply for parole after serving a minimum of 25 years. Olson's second parole hearing, on July 18, 2006, was also denied. Olson made many bizarre and false claims, including that the United States had granted him clemency for providing information about the September 11 attacks and that the hearing had no jurisdiction over him because of that. Under Canadian law, Olson was then entitled to make a case for parole every two years.

Olson was again refused parole in November 2010.

== Old age security pension controversy ==
Controversy developed in March 2010 when the media disclosed that Olson was receiving two federal government benefits from Canada while imprisoned, a total of C$1,169.47 monthly. Olson was eligible to receive the Canadian Old Age Security (OAS) pension. All persons who meet residency requirements as to length of time in Canada are eligible to receive this pension at age 65, and Olson turned 70 on January 1, 2010. Olson was also eligible to receive the Guaranteed Income Supplement (GIS), awarded to pensioners with low income. The money in question was being held in trust for Olson.

The Canadian Taxpayers Federation testified before the federal standing committee for Human Resources Development to have MPs pass Bill C-31, which would terminate pension benefits for prisoners. The organization also presented the government with 46,000 petition signatures requesting that Olson no longer receive the benefits. Prime Minister Stephen Harper asked government officials to look into the issue; on June 1, 2010, the government moved to terminate Olson's payments, calling the fact that he had been receiving them "outrageous" and "offensive". In September 2010, Olson sent one of his Old Age Security cheques to a Sun Media reporter, Peter Worthington, with a note asking him to forward the cheque to Harper's campaign for re-election.

== Illness and death ==
In September 2011, media reports indicated that Olson had terminal cancer and had been transferred to a hospital in Laval, Quebec. He died on September 30, 2011, at the age of 71.

== In the media ==
- The Investigation, a TV movie, was made in 2002, focusing on allegations that Royal Canadian Mounted Police (RCMP) bureaucracy delayed the arrest of Olson. It starred Nicholas Lea, Reece Dinsdale, David Warner and Lochlyn Munro.
- Olson's controversial plea bargain is referred to in a panel discussion at a serial killers' convention in the second volume of Neil Gaiman's Sandman series.
- Where Shadows Linger: the Untold Story of the RCMP's Olson Murders Investigation, by former Vancouver police officer William Leslie Holmes and Bruce L. Northorp, the RCMP officer who arrested Olson, was published in 2000 by Heritage House Publishing.
- In the second episode of the Canadian crime drama Da Vinci's Inquest, a homicide detective remarks that the Violent Crime Linkage Analysis System (ViCLAS) would have helped apprehend Olson sooner.
- Calls From a Killer (2025), the thirty-third season of CBC's Uncover podcast, hosted by Arlene Bynon and Nathaniel Frum. The series draws on hundreds of hours of previously unreleased recordings of secret telephone conversations between Bynon and Clifford Olson made while he was incarcerated, while also examining the investigation into his crimes, the "cash-for-bodies" agreement, and the impact on victims' families.

== See also ==
- List of serial killers by country
- List of serial killers by number of victims
