= John Cunningham (Irish criminal) =

Irish criminal

- Born: Ballyfermot, Ireland
- Known for: Involvement in a variety of crimes

John Cunningham is an Irish criminal with convictions for illicit drug smuggling and kidnapping.

== Early life ==
He was born in Ballyfermot.

== Bank robberies ==
He and his brother Michael were involved in a series of armed robberies in the 1970s and had strong links with Martin Cahill.

== Kidnapping of Jennifer Guinness ==
In 1986 he and his brother Michael kidnapped Jennifer Guinness, who was rescued by Gardaí 8 days later.

At trial, John and his brother Michael were convicted, along with Anthony Kelly, after being arrested at the house on Waterloo Road. Brian McNicholl was also convicted, with the judge accepting that his role was mainly to provide a location for Guinness to be held. Kelly died in 2005 from undisclosed causes; Michael Cunningham died in 2015, aged 65, after suffering a massive heart attack at his home in Ballyfermot.

John was sentenced to 17 years and Michael was sentenced in 14.

=== Escape ===
While awaiting early release he escaped from Shelton Abbey Prison and fled to the Netherlands in late 1996. Michael was released around the same time.

He built up an illicit drugs empire worth €50m. He rented a house with a swimming pool near Schiphol Airport, where he lived with his family. He was caught there in 2000 and convicted of trafficking €10m worth of illicit drugs between the Netherlands and Ireland. He was found guilty of trafficking ecstasy, amphetamines and cannabis and served four and a half years of an eight year sentence.

Then he was transferred to Ireland, where he spent the rest of sentence from the kidnapping trial in Limerick Prison. He was released from prison in 2007 and moved to Tallaght, then moved to the Costa del Sol in 2009.

He attended the funeral of his brother Michael at Church of Our Lady of the Assumption, Ballyfermot in January 2015 along with Martin Foley and Troy Jordan.

While in Spain, he became involved with the Kinahan Organised Crime Group run by Christy Kinahan.
