= Henry McKay (cricketer) =

Australian cricketer

Personal information
- Born: 1 January 1883; Goodwood, South Australia
- Died: 12 February 1926 (aged 43); Adelaide, Australia
- Source: Cricinfo, 19 August 2020

Henry McKay (1 January 1883 – 12 February 1926) was an Australian cricketer. He played in three first-class matches for South Australia in 1912/13.

== See also ==
- List of South Australian representative cricketers
