= Jermaine Allan Mann =

Jermaine Mann
- Born: Jermaine Allan Mann; Canada
- Known for: Child abductee
- Parents: Allan Mann (father); Lyneth Mann-Lewis (mother)

Jermaine Allan Mann, is a previously abducted child from Canada, who was discovered with his father living under falsified documents in the United States in October 2018. Mann's case is believed by law enforcement to be the longest case in North America, where the abducted child is reunited with a parent where they're both in safe conditions.

== Abduction ==
Mann was allegedly kidnapped by his father, Allan Mann, on 24 June 1987, when he was 21 months old during a scheduled visit in Toronto, Canada. His parents had separated the year prior. Lyneth Mann-Lewis reported her son's disappearance to the Missing Children Society of Canada (MCSC), when he and his father failed to return.

While in the United States, Mann and his father lived under counterfeit birth certificates and other documents. Through the documents, Allan Mann lived under the name "Hailee DeSouza", and claimed that he and his son were both born in Texas, and had relocated to Vernon, Connecticut.

Allan Mann was discovered in Section 8 housing in Vernon, and it was revealed that Allan Mann had told Jermaine that his mother had died after giving birth to him.

== Investigation ==
The case was investigated by the Department of Housing and Urban Development, the US Marshals Service, Department of Homeland Security, the Social Security Administration, the Toronto Police, and the Royal Canadian Mounted Police. The CEO of MCSC, Amanda Pick, and Mann-Lewis both credited the work of retired police officer Ted Davis, who investigated for the MCSC.

In August 2018, US Marshals interviewed several of Allan Mann's relatives and friends, who indicated that he may have settled in Connecticut. Later in the month a forensic specialist from the National Center for Missing and Exploited Children analyzed and compared an old picture of Allan Mann and the 2015 drivers license from DeSouza, and found they were likely the same person.

== Discovery ==
There is an active warrant for Allan Mann by the Canadian authorities, but extradition proceedings from the United States would not begin immediately. In the United States, Allan Mann is detained on charges which include making false statements in transactions with the US Department of Housing and Urban Development.

Mann-Lewis gave a press statement after news broke of his discovery; "I am the proof that after 31 long years of suffering, one should never give up. Be patient, be strong, and believe that all things are possible and anything can transpire." Shortly after the discovery, Mann-Lewis and Mann reunited.

== See also ==
- List of kidnappings
- List of solved missing person cases
