= Dennis Dechaine case =

Murder case in Maine, United States

Mug shot of Dennis Dechaine

On March 18, 1989, 31-year-old Dennis Dechaine of Bowdoinham, Maine, was convicted for the 1988 murder of 12-year-old Sarah Cherry (May 5, 1976–July 6, 1988), who was abducted, tortured and found in a wooded area. He was sentenced to life imprisonment without the possibility of parole. Dechaine has filed a number of appeals, maintaining that he is innocent. However, he remains incarcerated at Maine State Prison in Warren, Maine.

== Murder ==
On July 6, 1988, 12-year-old Sarah Cherry was abducted while babysitting at a home in a rural part of Bowdoin, Maine. A couple of items were left in the driveway of the house (the abduction scene) that linked Dennis Dechaine, a 31-year-old farmer, to the crime, such as an estimate with his name on it. Two days later, on July 8th, Cherry's body was found hidden in a wooded area. She had been bound with rope, assaulted sexually with birch sticks, stabbed, and then strangled with a scarf. Both the rope and scarf, as well as the items in the driveway, came from Dechaine's truck. Dechaine claims that the items from his truck were taken by the actual perpetrator, and were used to implicate him. Dechaine's account of that day was that he left his farm and drove to the woods to do drugs, getting lost in the process. He then came across an elderly couple and flagged down a police car.

During questioning from the authorities, Dechaine lied about going fishing, his employment, and residence. According to Dechaine, he lied due to his use of illegal drugs. Dechaine's red Toyota pickup truck was found approximately 450 feet from where Cherry's body was found. Forensic analysis did not recover any evidence that Cherry had been in the truck, nor did a tracking dog.

== Conviction and appeals ==
The case went to trial in March 1989. On March 18, Dechaine was convicted of her murder and sentenced to life in prison without the possibility of parole. Since his conviction, Dechaine has filed numerous appeals for a new trial, citing that male DNA under Sarah Cherry's fingernails did not match him. In April 2014, another appeal for a new trial was denied. It argued that the DNA evidence, which was not available at Dechaine's trial, implicated someone else.

In July 2015, the Maine Supreme Judicial Court denied Dechaine's request for a new trial, concluding that the DNA evidence was insufficient.

In October 2016, the United States Court of Appeals for the First Circuit in Boston denied Dechaine's final appeal on a habeas proceeding.

In September 2021, Dechaine’s attorneys filed a Motion for additional DNA testing based on new more sensitive collection technology that has become available in the State of Maine.

On July 22, 2022, Judge Bruce C. Mallonee of the Maine Superior Court entered an Order on Motion for Further DNA Testing by the new Instruments and techniques that are immensely more powerful in gathering and analyzing samples than any technology in existence in 2012. Those include the M-VAC Wet Vacuum Collection System and software for probabilistic genotyping. The court concluded that the Motion was timely since it was brought within two years of the updated technology becoming commonly known in the State of Maine.

On November 6, 2022, the Portland Press Herald reported that the Serological Research Institute (SERI) in Richmond, California, used a method that was 66 times more capable of collecting materials than prior technology according to the FBI. Partial male DNA was found on at least four of the six objects tested. Dechaine was definitely excluded from DNA found on three objects: the bra worn by Cherry, one of the sticks used to violate her and the bandana used to gag her. The attempt to match DNA profiles on three more objects was inconclusive as there was not enough data to either exclude or include Dechaine as the source of the DNA.

Dechaine’s attorneys filed a motion for a new trial based on the new DNA tests. Judge Mallonee held a two-day evidentiary hearing concerning the DNA evidence in April 2024. In January 2025, he denied the motion for a new trial, ruling that the new DNA evidence did not exclude Dechaine as the culprit, did not link any new suspect to the crime, and was too weak to overcome the evidence presented at Dechaine's original trial.

In February 2025, Dechaine's lawyers filed another appeal, arguing that the prosecutor committed misconduct during the original trial by referring to God during closing argument, which they argue may have “unconstitutionally swayed the jury.” The prosecutor had explained away the lack of certain evidence in the case by saying “I can give you no better answer than to say, that’s the way God made it.”

== Coverage ==
Dechaine's case was featured on the television program, The Investigators, in 2005.

A documentary entitled Murder in America: The Sarah Cherry Story was released about this case.

A book entitled Human Sacrifice was released by James P. Moore on Dechaine's case in 2002.

This case helped inspire the novel Death at Breakfast that was released by Beth Gutcheon in 2016. It also loosely inspired the novel Trespasser (NY: Minotaur Books, 2012) by Paul Doiron (see "Epilogue," p. 309).
