= Disappearance of Mary Louise Day =

Formerly missing American child found alive (1968–2017)

Mary Louise Day
- Born: Mary Louise Day; February 19, 1968; Little Falls, New York, US
- Disappeared: July 15, 1981 (aged 13); Seaside, California, US
- Status: Found alive on November 25, 2003
- Died: 2017 (aged 48–49)
- Other names: Phoenix Mary; Monica Deveraux
- Parents: Charles Day (father); Charlotte Houle (mother)
- Relatives: Kathy (sister); Sherrie (sister)

Locations
1 Seaside, California
2 Arizona where the traffic stop took place in 2003
3 Missouri, the death in 2017

Mary Louise Day (February 19, 1968–2017) was an American teenager who, at age 13 in 1981, mysteriously disappeared from her home in Seaside, California. She was found alive in 2003, a little more than twenty-two years after her disappearance.

== Childhood ==
Mary Day was born in Little Falls, New York, on February 19, 1968, to Charlotte Day (née Pressler) and her husband Charles Day. She had two younger sisters, Kathy and Sherrie. They were in and out of foster homes in their early years because their mother was often unable to care for them.

At some point while the girls were in foster care, Charlotte divorced from Charles and remarried to a man named William Houle. In 1975, Houle enlisted in the United States Army, and Charlotte attained permanent and full custody of Mary and Kathy shortly thereafter, leaving Sherrie behind in foster care. In 1978, the family moved to Hawaii due to Houle being stationed there. By this time, Sherrie had been legally adopted by one of her foster families (the Waits family) and was thereby separated from her birth family.

Before leaving New York, Charlotte gave birth to a daughter, Billie Jeanne. The family then moved to an army base in Georgia. Later, while in Hawaii, Charlotte gave birth to a son, William Jr. Mary's biological father Charles Day was killed in an accident during this time, leaving inheritance money to Mary and Kathy. They would refer to this money as their escape plan and use the code word "Mohawk" when discussing it.

In December 1980, Mary was removed from her mother and stepfather's care and taken into protective custody after it was discovered that William was physically abusing her. The family then moved to Seaside, California, following a change in William's base. But Mary was kept in Hawaii until a few months later, when she was sent to live with the rest of her family in California. While Mary was in Seaside, she frequently attempted to run away from her home but would always be returned by police officers. This, however, was never proven and was only told to police by Charlotte Houle.

== Disappearance ==
On or about July 15, 1981, Mary Day disappeared from her home in California. Her parents did not report her missing, and almost no one aside from them knew she was missing. In 1992, Sherrie (Waits) Calgaro filed a missing persons report to the Ft. Ord military base in California, but by then eleven years had passed and police did not launch a full investigation. Sherrie was sent a postcard that stated the police had done a records search and no information was found. Sherrie sent information about Mary Day and a photo of her to the National Center for Missing and Exploited Children in late 1999, at which point an image of how Mary might have looked at the time was developed. This age-progressed image depicted her at age 31.

Sherrie spoke to police regarding Mary's disappearance, and an official investigation was opened in 2002 as Ft. Ord was being shut down and all cold cases were being reviewed. Her family were the only ones who knew about her disappearance; their neighbors were unable to recall them and did not recognize pictures of Mary, who had not been enrolled in school while living in Seaside.

Kathy was able to give a more detailed account of the night of Mary Day's disappearance. She and Mary stayed home while William, Charlotte, and their two siblings went out to dinner. When they returned, William's dog, of which he was very fond, began presenting signs of physical illness that made him appear to be dying. William became extremely angry and accused Mary of poisoning the dog, after which he began to beat her. Kathy said William began to yell, scaring her, shortly after which "all hell broke loose." She further said she remembered the fight between Mary and William, and that Mary had been yelling. She concluded by stating that the last time she saw Mary, she had blood coming out of her mouth. The next morning, Kathy said, Mary Day was no longer in the house. When she asked her mother where Mary went, Charlotte told her that Mary ran away and to never speak her name again. Sometime later, the family moved to New York (Sherrie was 12 at the time) where Sherrie visited them. She noticed that Mary was not with them and asked Charlotte where Mary was. Charlotte again said that Mary had run away, was on drugs, and had become a prostitute. Charlotte had also stated she had burned all pictures of Mary that she had. When Sherrie attempted to ask Kathy while spending the night about what happened to Mary, Kathy replied that they were not allowed to speak about Mary Day.

At age 14, Kathy was also kicked out of the family home and was forced to live on her own at a young age. At age 18, Sherrie started questioning the statements her biological mother Charlotte had made, and when getting in touch with her she was appalled by her birth mother's callous disregard for her sister's whereabouts. She questioned Charlotte and wrote her answers in a tablet to keep a record. One statement that stood out to her, and which she told police that she remembered, was her mother proclaiming that she knew of locations in California in which one could hide a corpse and never have it be found. Following this, Sherrie began to believe her sister Mary was murdered.

== Investigation ==
After interviewing both Kathy and Sherrie, investigators also began to believe that Mary had been murdered on the night of her disappearance. In addition to Kathy and Sherrie, investigators were able to track down Charlotte and William Houle to Kansas, where they were interviewed by local police. Charlotte reported not remembering many of the facts regarding her daughter’s disappearance, and that the last time she saw Mary was in 1981 when she ran away. She admitted that she and William should have taken steps to locate Mary after her initial disappearance. She went on to claim that William had filed a runaway report with the Salinas police department, but there was no record of anyone reporting her missing prior to 1992. Charlotte had also lied to Sherrie when meeting her in 1983 in New York by saying that they had listed her as missing and had searched for her and even had “all points bulletins“ placed to help find her. All of this was found to be lies.

It was assumed that Charlotte and William chose to not report Mary missing because they were cashing her Social Security benefits at the time of her disappearance. However, investigators and Mary's siblings thought they had been hiding something sinister about Mary's disappearance, enforced by Charlotte saying in her interview, "If [Mary’s] dead, she’s dead." When police questioned William, he initially claimed that on the night of Mary’s disappearance, he had been checking each bedroom and noticed Mary was not in hers. He said he and Charlotte panicked and contacted police, but there was no record of such a phone call. William would later admit to beating Mary on the night she was last seen. He explained that he was extremely angry over his dog’s illness and, blaming her, viciously beat her. He said that Mary attempted to leave the house and that he used a martial arts technique to try and subdue her, specifically a chokehold.

The morning after Mary went missing, Charlotte told William she saw "Satan" in his eyes the night before and likened it to him being “possessed by a demon.” When asked if he could have killed Mary, he denied it. He was then asked if the demon inside of him could have killed her, and he responded in the affirmative. Kathy told investigators that shortly after Mary went missing, William told the children to not go in a specific corner of the home’s backyard. Investigators brought her back to the old home in 2003 and she directed them to the corner. Cadaver dogs were brought in and they detected the scent of human remains in the area. When police dug there, they uncovered a small child's shoe. The shoe appeared to be a tennis shoe, and Kathy said they often wore that type of footwear as children. Investigators believed they had enough evidence to build a credible homicide case and began to compile one against Charlotte and William Houle.

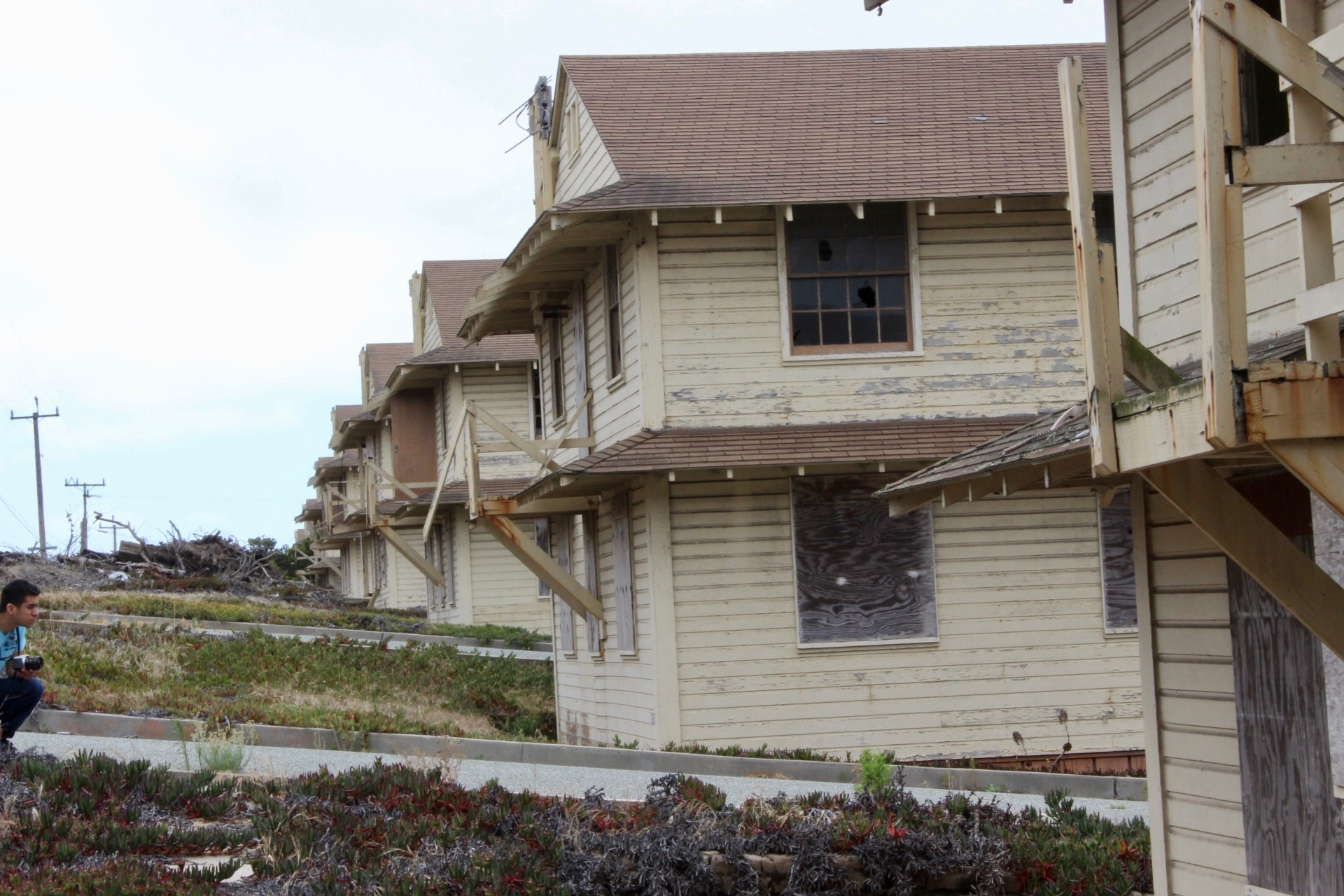
Fort Ord barracks

In 2008, cadaver dogs that had been working on an unrelated matter alerted near a second home where the Houles had lived at the Army base in Fort Ord — the house they had moved to shortly after Mary disappeared.

== Reappearance ==
On November 25, 2003, a pickup truck was pulled over as a routine traffic stop. The truck had stolen license plates, leading to the police collecting and examining the identifications of the passengers. One of the passengers was a woman whose Arizona state identification card bore the name Mary Day; this also contained the missing Mary's birth date and other pertinent information. The woman was detained, and when she was interviewed, she claimed she ran away from her home to avoid abuse from Charlotte and William Houle. Investigators were skeptical as to the credibility of her accounts, as she had a thick southern accent; Mary Day did not have such an accent. Police also discovered that her identification had been issued three weeks prior to her arrest, which is around the time the homicide investigation began.

Investigators initially theorized that the woman was an imposter and took DNA samples in order to determine whether or not her claim was true. Her DNA was compared to that of Charlotte Houle, which revealed that the woman was a biological child of hers. The investigation into Mary's disappearance was closed, and her sister Sherrie invited her to live with her family in North Carolina. Despite the DNA match, Kathy and Sherrie also had doubts of Mary’s true identity due to her southern accent and her unwillingness or inability to give a coherent, logical explanation of what actually happened to her after she disappeared from the family home in 1981. Kathy did not believe Mary since she did not remember much from her childhood, including the inheritance and the codeword "Mohawk," whereas Sherrie noticed that Mary's magazines were shipped to the name "Monica Devereaux" but seemingly did not notice that the alias shared initials with "Mary Day." During her stay with Sherrie in North Carolina, Mary exhibited bizarre behaviors that led Sherrie to theorize that she had multiple personality disorder. Mary often told rambling stories that were disjointed and had no logical timelines. Later questions to Mary would elicit different answers than previous ones. During her stay in North Carolina, she made several attempts to overdose with Tylenol and was a severe alcoholic. She also became violent at times causing a break in the relationship with her sister Sherrie who had two small children in her home.

Mary took a bus back to Arizona where she eventually married a man with the surname of Gessler. They moved from Arizona to Missouri. Police reports show that her husband was abusive to her. She stayed in Missouri until her death in 2017. Sherrie and her daughter visited Mary in Missouri shortly before her death, but Mary still offered no logical explanations or timelines after her disappearance. Without knowing all the facts of the case and wishing to end the whole debate and move on, Sherrie decided to accept this woman as her sister Mary.

No funeral was held after Mary’s death. The people who were her neighbors never bothered to inform Mary's family of her death and had also refused to let Sherrie speak with Mary on the phone again after she had visited. Sherrie began to have doubts about the woman's identity again after a 48 Hours episode about Mary aired and she learned more details of the case.

== See also ==
- List of solved missing person cases: 1950–1999
