= Murder of Andrea Scherpf and Bernd Göricke =

1983 murder of two German tourists in Canada

Andrea Scherpf
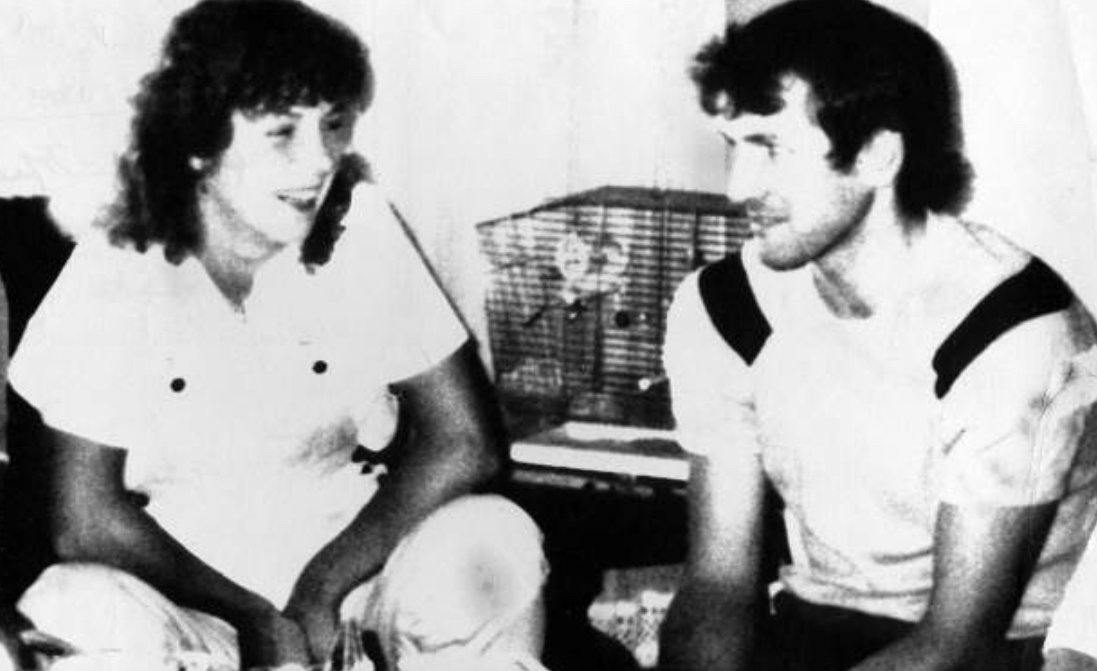
- Scherpf (left) and Göricke (right) in 1983
- Born: December 31, 1959; Germany
- Died: October 1983; Chetwynd, Canada
- Cause of death: Ballistic trauma
- Known for: Victim of unsolved murder
- Partner: Bernd Göricke

Bernd Göricke
- Born: June 29, 1956; Germany
- Died: October 1983; Chetwynd, Canada
- Cause of death: Ballistic trauma
- Known for: Victim of unsolved murder
- Partner: Andrea Scherpf

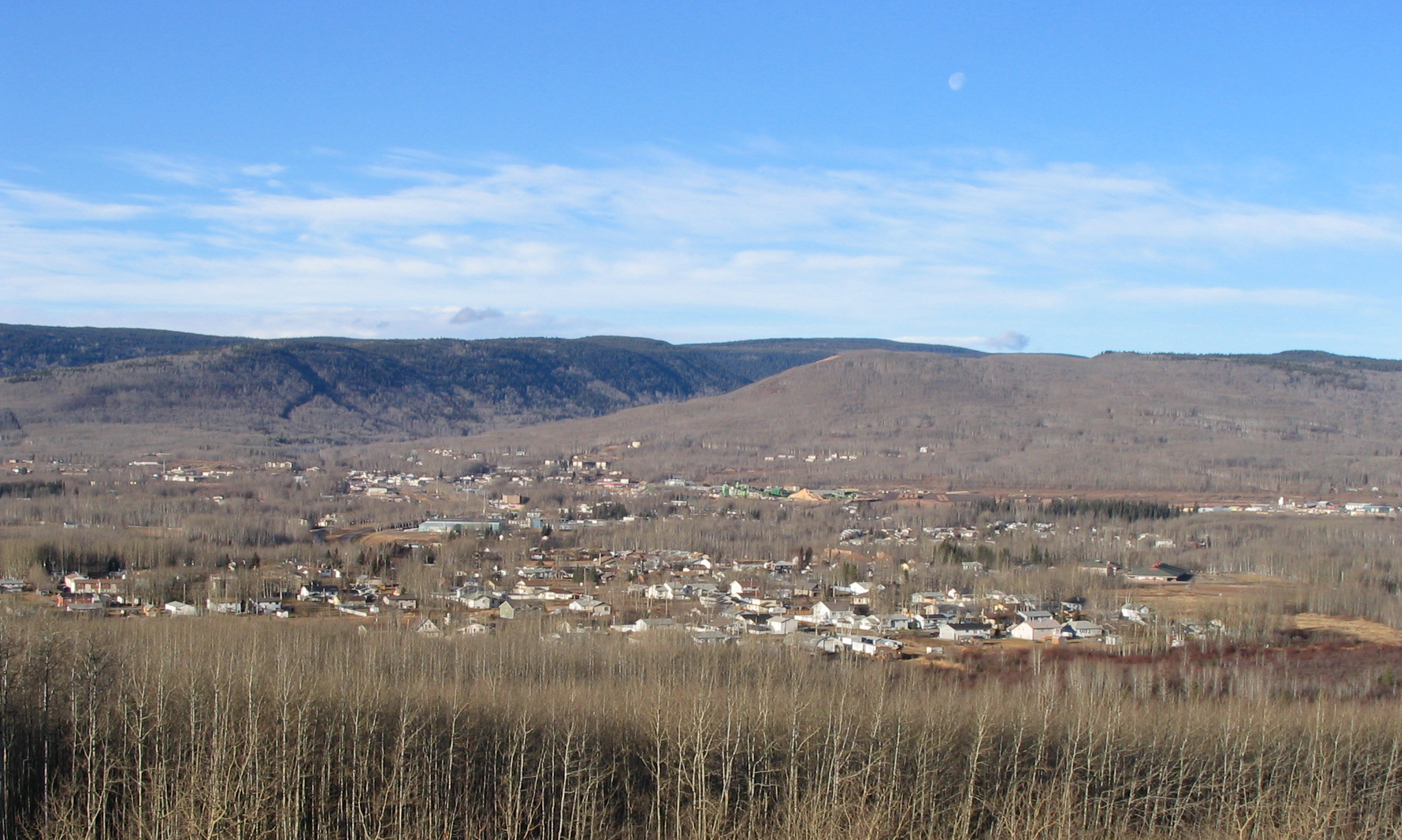
Chetwynd with about 2,500 inhabitants

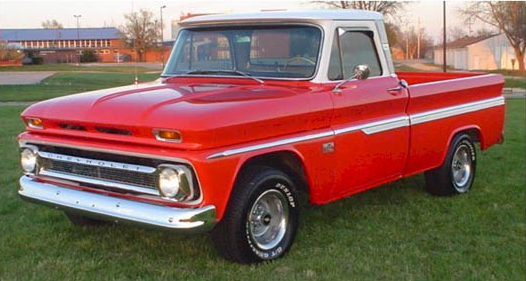
The killer drove a 1960s Chevrolet pick-up.

Andrea Scherpf and Bernd Göricke were a young German tourist couple shot and killed in Chetwynd, Canada in early October 1983. A Canadian was convicted of the murders in 1991, but was later exonerated by DNA evidence and released. The case remains unsolved.

== Disappearance and murder ==
German tourists Andrea Scherpf (born 31 December 1959) and Bernd Göricke (born 29 June 1956) were hitchhiking in western Canada in the fall of 1983. On or about 3 October, the couple accepted a ride in a 1960s Chevrolet pick-up in Chetwynd, British Columbia. The unidentified driver of the vehicle shot both victims and dumped the bodies 32 kilometers west of Chetwynd, near British Columbia Highway 97 and the Pine River. The killer stole the victims' property and dumped a pair of blood-spattered jeans in a nearby trashcan, then drove south and bought gasoline on 4–5 October using five of Andrea Scherpf's traveler's checks, in Prince George, Quesnel, McLeese Lake, Lac La Hache and 100 Mile House.

== Investigation ==
The bodies of Scherpf and Göricke were found on 6 October. Forensic dentistry suggested possible European identity, and subsequent communication with Interpol allowed for the identification of the victims on 16 October. Over the next six years, 900 tips were collected, but the investigation remained unsuccessful.

== Suspects ==
=== Andy Rose ===
In August 1989, Andy Rose was implicated in the murders in a statement by Madonna Mary Kelly. Rose and Kelly were both working in Chetwynd in 1983. In a conversation with an undercover police informant, Madonna Marie Kelly claimed that in October 1983, Rose had arrived on her doorstep, drunk and covered in blood, claiming to have murdered two people.

Rose was charged and convicted of the murders in 1991, based almost entirely on Kelly's testimony. Rose was convicted again in 1994, following an appeal. However, in March 1996, DNA analysis revealed that there were no DNA traces of Andy Rose on the bloody jeans from the scene. Subsequent to this and the claims from suspect Vance Hill's ex-wife, Rose was released on bail in 1998, pending a third trial in 2001. Between Rose's release and the 2001 trial, the RCMP repeatedly attempted to get a confession from Rose using undercover officers in a "Mr. Big" sting operation.

In 2001, at the third trial against Rose, the DNA traces on the jeans were linked to at least five people, including the victims. The DNA of a third person was salient, but did not match Rose. It also did not match the alternative suspect, Vance Hill. Prosecutor Gil McKinnon issued an acquittal for Rose, who had by this time spent almost 10 years in prison for the murders.

=== Vance Hill ===
Vance Hill was an American construction worker from California who had been living in western Canada since 1967, with his wife and three children. Hill was a hunter and a chronic alcoholic. In April 1983, Hill and his wife separated, and she moved back to California with the children. Hill remained behind in Prince George, British Columbia, three hours from Chetwynd.

The Royal Canadian Mounted Police arrested Hill on 21 October 1983 on two unrelated charges of Obtaining Lodging By False Pretences. In November, Hill returned to his family in California, and apparently confessed the murders to his estranged wife Willadeen sometime in 1984. Hill threatened suicide at least once before, later killing himself on 28 July 1985.

In 1997, Willadeen Hill told the story to her nephew, who informed the police. According to Hill, her ex-husband told her: "The couple asked him if he could take them, and he agreed. He began to harass the woman. When her friend protested, he stopped the pick-up, they got out and began to argue. He reached into the pick-up, took the rifle, and shot him. The woman screamed and screamed and did not want to shut up. He said he also had to kill her."

== Current status ==
As DNA analysis eliminated both known suspects, the case remains unsolved. In January 2009, Canadian journalist Linden MacIntyre reported extensively on the case and the attempts to convict Andy Rose in an episode of the Canadian investigative journalism program The Fifth Estate.

In 2013, 30 years after the murders, police called for any member of the general public with information on the missing property of the two victims to come forward.

== See also ==
- List of unsolved murders
- List of solved missing person cases
