= Jennifer Guinness =

English-born Irish socialite

- Born: Mary Jennifer Hollwey; 22 August 1937; England
- Died: 23 January 2016 (aged 78); Ireland
- Occupation: Socialite
- Known for: Being kidnapped and held for ransom
- Spouse: John Henry Guinness (m. 1959; died 1988)

Mary Jennifer Guinness (née Hollwey; 22 August 1937 – 23 January 2016), was an English-born Irish socialite and member of the Guinness family. She was a keen sailor and a member of Howth Yacht Club.

== Kidnapping ==
She was kidnapped for ransom in April 1986, but rescued by the Garda Síochána from a home on Waterloo Road in south Dublin eight days later.

At trial, brothers Michael and John Cunningham were convicted, along with Anthony Kelly, after being arrested at the house on Waterloo Road. Brian McNicholl was also convicted, with the judge accepting that his role was mainly to provide a location for Guinness to be held. Kelly died in 2005 from undisclosed causes; Michael Cunningham died in 2015, aged 65, after suffering a massive heart attack at his home in Ballyfermot.

== Personal life ==
Her father was James Bell Hollwey. She married John Henry Guinness on 9 April 1959, and they had three children. Guinness and her family lived at Ceanchor House, Ceanchor Road, Baily, Howth, County Dublin.

Her husband died aged 52 in a mountain-walking accident in Snowdonia. Jennifer Guinness died on 23 January 2016, aged 78, following a long battle with cancer.

== See also ==
- List of kidnappings
- Lists of solved missing person cases
