= Murder of Tanya Moore and Tina Rodriguez =

1986 killings in Philadelphia, US

Tanya Moore
- Born: 1955; Philadelphia, Pennsylvania, U.S.
- Died: July 3, 1986 (aged 30–31); Philadelphia, Pennsylvania, U.S.
- Cause of death: Homicide
- Occupation: Sex worker
- Known for: Victim of unsolved murder

Tina Rodriguez
- Born: 1959; Puerto Rico
- Died: July 3, 1986 (aged 26–27); Philadelphia, Pennsylvania, U.S.
- Cause of death: Homicide
- Occupation: Sex worker
- Known for: Victim of unsolved murder

Tanya Moore and Tina Rodriguez were two transgender women and sex workers. The pair disappeared on June 30, 1986, from 13th Street Philadelphia, Pennsylvania after getting into the car of two men. On July 3, 1986, their mutilated and dismembered bodies were found burning at a baseball diamond in Middletown Township.

== Disappearance and deaths ==
After getting into a light medium-sized van with two male clients on June 30, 1986, Moore and Rodriguez were not seen again. Other sex workers describe the men last seen with the victims as being two white males between the ages of twenty-five and thirty-five. The driver had curly dark hair and a mustache; the second suspect was blonde and clean shaven. At 12:31 a.m. on July 3, 1986, police and firefighters responded to the report of a brush fire; the Fairless Hills Fire Co. found two burning bodies instead. Near the corpses were a soda bottle with gasoline in it, a burned up cigarette butt, and a matchbook that was used for a fuse to light the gasoline. Through fingerprint analysis, the FBI matched the victims to prison records belonging to Jonathan Streater and Faustino Arroyo.

== Victims ==
Tanya Moore was a 31-year-old transgender sex worker, born in the Germantown neighborhood of Philadelphia. Tanya had over twenty arrests for prostitution in Pennsylvania going back thirteen years prior to her death. Tiffany Hall, a friend of Tanya and Tina said, "Streater was clean cut and went to church", but that Tina was "boy crazy" and estranged from her family, and always getting bailed out of jail for prostitution and other offenses.

Tina Rodriguez was a 27-year-old transgender sex worker. She was born in Puerto Rico, but grew up in Camden, New Jersey. She had over fifty prostitution arrests in New Jersey, Pennsylvania, and New York prior to her death. Her half-brother, Arnaldo Mojica, told a newspaper in 1986 that Arroyo hadn't been seen at the family's home in Camden for six months leading up to the murders. Mojica said the family knew Arroyo was "gay". Arnaldo also said that Arroyo's mother "went all the time to Philadelphia to get him out of jail, going on to say, "We tried to help him, tell him to stay home, but he would always go away." Tina was the smaller of the two; weighing one hundred and twenty pounds (54 kg) at five foot six inches (1.68 m) tall.

== Suspects ==
Around 2001, an unidentified witness told Middletown police that Moore and Rodriguez were killed by himself and an "infamous member of the Warlocks Motorcycle Club" after picking them up for sex and discovering they were transgender. No charges were filed because the statement was made under a proffer agreement.

At the time, the Warlock gang member was on trial for killing a woman in upstate Pennsylvania, and was eventually convicted of first-degree murder and sentenced to life in prison.

== See also ==
- List of people killed for being transgender
- Lists of solved missing person cases
- List of unsolved murders (1900–1979)
