= Harry McKay (politician) =

Canadian politician

Judge on the Supreme Court of British Columbia
- In office 1971–1980s

Member of the British Columbia Legislative Assembly for Fernie
- In office 1960 – 1966

County Court Judge of Nanaimo
- In office 1967 – 1971

Personal details
- Born: March 29, 1925 Michel, British Columbia
- Died: 1987 (aged 61–62)

Henry Cartmell "Harry" McKay (March 29, 1925 – 1987) was a lawyer, judge and political figure in British Columbia. He represented Fernie in the Legislative Assembly of British Columbia from 1960 to 1966 as a Liberal.

He was born in Michel, British Columbia, the son of Walter McKay and Ann Cartmell, and was educated there. In 1947, he married Jean Cameron Hooker. McKay ran unsuccessfully for a seat in the provincial assembly in 1953. He was defeated when he ran for reelection in the newly created riding of Kootenay in 1966.

After leaving politics, McKay was named a county court judge for Nanaimo. In 1971, he was named to the Supreme Court of British Columbia.

In passing sentence on convicted child killer Clifford Olson, McKay said "There is no punishment in a civilized society that is adequate ... it is my considered opinion that you should never be granted parole ... It would be foolhardy to ever allow you to be at large."
