= List of kidnappings (1980–1989) =

The following is a list of kidnappings that occurred in the 1980s, summarizing the events of each case, including instances of celebrity abductions, claimed hoaxes, suspected kidnappings, extradition abductions, and mass kidnappings.

== 1980 ==
Date	Victim(s)	Abductor(s)	Location	Age of victim(s)	Outcome	Notes
14 February 1980	Timothy White	Kenneth Parnell	(United States) Ukiah, California, U.S.	5	Rescued/escaped	White was abducted by Parnell, who had abducted Steven Stayner seven years earlier. Stayner helped White escape on 1 March 1980.
28 May 1980	Dorothy Jane Scott	Unknown	(United States) Anaheim, California, U.S.	32	Murdered	She was abducted in her car from the parking lot of a hospital where her friend was getting a spider bite examined. Her bones were found on 6 August 1984, next to those of a dog near Santa Ana Canyon Road, being identified by her jewelry and dental records. She had previously received phone calls alternating from infatuated to threatening from an unidentified stalker. The stalker later called her mother and claimed responsibility for her murder. Her case remains unsolved.
13 June 1980	Tiffany Papesh	Brandon Flagner	(United States) Maple Heights, Ohio, U.S.	8	Murdered	A girl was kidnapped while shopping alone for a family member. Flagner was convicted of her murder, despite the fact that her body was never found. He eventually recanted his confession. His conviction has yet to be overturned.
13 November 1980	Patricia Cubbage	Edward Benton Fitzgerald Sr., Daniel Leroy Johnson	(United States) Richmond, Virginia, U.S.	22	Murdered	Cubbage was a motel clerk, small-time drug dealer, and alleged police informant. She was raped and stabbed to death by drug dealers Edward Benton Fitzgerald Sr. and Daniel Leroy Johnson. The pair were arrested within twenty-four hours. Fitgerald was sentenced to death and executed on 23 July 1992; Johnson was sentenced to forty years' imprisonment.
3 December 1980	Patsy Gaisior	Robert Ruff, Frank Johnson	(United States) Harrisburg, Pennsylvania, U.S.	31	Murdered	The body of the victim was never recovered, but two suspects were convicted.

== 1981 ==
Date	Image	Victim(s)	Abductor(s)	Location	Age of victim(s)	Outcome	Notes
6 January 1981		Marion Crofts	Tony Jasinskyj	Aldershot, England	14	Murdered	Abducted, raped and beaten to death while cycling to a clarinet lesson. Her case remained unsolved until 1999, when the perpetrator's DNA was matched to former lance corporal Tony Jasinskyj, who was convicted and sentenced to life imprisonment.
24 January 1981 and 6 February 1981		Agnes Ng Siew Heok	Adrian Lim, Catherine Tan Mui Choo, Hoe Kah Hong	Toa Payoh, Singapore	9	Murdered	In what became notoriously known as the Toa Payoh ritual murders, Lim and his accomplices Tan and Hoe lured Agnes to their flat on 24 January, drugged her, then drew blood from her before suffocating her. Two weeks later, on 6 February, Ghazali was also lured in and murdered. This was an act done to distract the police from investigating an existing rape charge on Lim. All three were found guilty after a 41-day trial, given the death sentence on 23 May 1983, and hanged on 25 November 1988.
24 January 1981 and 6 February 1981		Ghazali bin Marzuki	Adrian Lim, Catherine Tan Mui Choo, Hoe Kah Hong	Toa Payoh, Singapore	10	Murdered	In what became notoriously known as the Toa Payoh ritual murders, Lim and his accomplices Tan and Hoe lured Agnes to their flat on 24 January, drugged her, then drew blood from her before suffocating her. Two weeks later, on 6 February, Ghazali was also lured in and murdered. This was an act done to distract the police from investigating an existing rape charge on Lim. All three were found guilty after a 41-day trial, given the death sentence on 23 May 1983, and hanged on 25 November 1988.
21 March 1981		Michael Donald	Henry Hays, James Knowles	(United States) Mobile, Alabama, U.S.	19	Murdered	African-American who was selected at random and abducted by Ku Klux Klan members Henry Hays and James Knowles in revenge for the murder of a white police officer by African-American robber Josephus Anderson. The two Klansmen drove Donald to a neighbouring county, beat him with a tree branch, slit his throat three times and hanged him from a tree. Hays was given the death penalty for the crime, making him the only Klansman executed for killing an African-American.
11–12 April 1981		Tina Sharp	Unidentified	(United States) Keddie, California, U.S.	12	Murdered	One of four victims of the unsolved Keddie Cabin murders, when four inhabitants of cabin No. 28 in the resort town of Keddie were murdered on the night of April 11―12, 1981. Tina Sharp, unlike the other three victims, was missing from the scene when the crime was discovered; her remains were later found near Feather Falls in 1984.
20 May 1981		Lee Standifer	David Earl Miller	(United States) Knoxville, Tennessee, U.S.	23	Murdered	Lee Standifer was on a date with her killer when she was attacked and murdered inside a house of an ordained minister in Tennessee, and her body was found hanged a day later in the backyard. The perpetrator, David Earl Miller, was convicted of the murder and sentenced to death in 1984, and he was executed by the electric chair on December 6, 2018.
14 June 1981		Linda Dianne Smith	Unknown white male	(United States) Pocatello, Idaho, U.S.	14	Murdered	Linda was abducted from her home while babysitting her 9-year-old brother. Local police ignored her brother's eye witness account of the abduction and assumed he was covering for Linda, who ran away. One week later Linda's clothes were found near the Pocatello Creek exit in Pocatello. Police maintained she was a runaway. Eleven months later, Linda's skeletal remains were found below Hospital Way near the Center Street exit in Pocatello. Many mistakes were made mainly due to the police department's assumption that Linda ran away. Although DNA technology did not really exist in 1980, had the police done their due diligence initially they could perhaps have found the perpetrator's fingerprints on the back door he entered and subsequently exited or other physical evidence such as stray fibers or possibly even the perpetrator's vehicle which Linda's brother described.
27 July 1981		Adam Walsh	Ottis Toole	(United States) Hollywood, Florida, U.S.	6	Murdered	Walsh was abducted from a Sears department store at the Hollywood Mall and murdered; only his severed head was found. His father, John Walsh, later became the host of America's Most Wanted.
12 August 1981		Jennifer Cardy	Robert Black	Ballinderry, County Antrim, Northern Ireland	9	Murdered	The first victim proven to have been murdered by Robert Black, a paedophilic serial killer convicted of four murders. She was kidnapped by Black while cycling to a friend's house and was found dead hours later, having been sexually abused and strangled.
16 August 1981		Charles Armstrong	Provisional Irish Republican Army	(Republic of Ireland) Dundalk, Ireland	55	Murdered	Armstrong was an Irish laborer from Crossmaglen who was abducted and killed by the Provisional IRA, and his body dumped in a bog in County Monaghan.
September 1981		Sidney Jaffe	Timm Johnsen and Daniel Kear	Toronto, Canada	56	Released	American-Canadian businessman who was kidnapped by two bounty hunters and returned to Florida, where he was tried in absentia for failing to appear for land sales fraud.
15 September 1981		Ursula Herrmann	Werner Mazurek (but see notes)	Schondorf, West Germany	10	Died	Ursula Herrmann, a 10-year-old schoolgirl, was abducted on her way home from gym class. Her family received a ransom demand for 2 million Deutsche Marks, but the kidnapper(s) cut off communication before arrangements were made to deliver the money. Several days later, Ursula was found dead in a box buried in a nearby forest. The box was stocked with food and drink to last a number of days but had inadequate ventilation, and the child is believed to have died in a matter of hours; some evidence suggests she may have been dead before being locked in. Despite an extensive investigation, no culprit was apprehended at the time. In 2007, police and prosecutors renewed their investigation into Werner Mazurek, who was a suspect at the time and was implicated by an alleged accomplice who had, however, retracted his confession and witness statement and since died. Based on this statement and circumstantial evidence, Mazurek was convicted in 2010 of kidnapping resulting in death and sentenced to life imprisonment. Mazurek continues to protest his innocence, and the victim's family have not accepted Mazurek's guilt. The family have attempted to force a new inquiry, but the case is officially closed. Since the crime was not deemed a murder, it would by now have been prescribed.
29 October 1981		Tina Harmon	Robert Anthony Buell	(United States) Lodi, Ohio, U.S.	12	Murdered	Harmon was abducted while away from home in Creston, Ohio. She was found raped and strangled five days later. Her murder remained unsolved until 2011 when DNA from the scene was matched to Robert Buell. It is unknown if Buell was the only person involved in her murder.
3 November 1981		Marcy Renee Conrad	Anthony Jacques Broussard	(United States) Milpitas, California, U.S.	14	Murdered	High school student abducted, raped and killed by another student, who then dumped her body in a ravine, but brought several students to view the body. Two days later, he was denounced and arrested.
17 December 1981		James Lee Dozier	Red Brigades	Verona, Italy	50	Rescued	Dozier was a US general working for NATO in Italy. He and his wife were kidnapped by a Marxist terrorist group and freed by a NOCS commando on 28 January 1982.
18 December 1981		Nina von Gallwitz	Unknown	Cologne, West Germany	8	Released	Von Gallwitz was kidnapped on her way to school. Her parents paid a ransom of 1.5 million German marks and she was freed on 15 May 1982 at a rest area called Ohligser Heide after 149 days.

== 1982 ==
Date	Image	Victim(s)	Abductor(s)	Location	Age of victim(s)	Outcome	Notes
1982		Chila Silvernails	Joseph Kondro	(United States) Longview, Washington, U.S.	8	Murdered	Chila Silvernails disappeared in 1982 from Kalama, WA and was found dead the next day after being killed.
20 April 1982		Peter Pocklington	Mirko Petrović	Edmonton, Canada	40	Rescued	Peter Pocklington is a Canadian entrepreneur who was taken hostage along with his wife Eva, maid Carmen Mitchell and babysitter Joseph Wright by a Yugoslav immigrant who planned to kidnap Eva. After she escaped and Mitchell and Wright were released, Petrović attempted to extort Pocklington's associates for a ransom, but was prevented from doing so after police went into the house and opened fire, wounding both him and Pocklington. Both men recovered, and Petrović was later deported.
20 April 1982		Eva Pocklington	Mirko Petrović	Edmonton, Canada	Unknown	Escaped	Peter Pocklington is a Canadian entrepreneur who was taken hostage along with his wife Eva, maid Carmen Mitchell and babysitter Joseph Wright by a Yugoslav immigrant who planned to kidnap Eva. After she escaped and Mitchell and Wright were released, Petrović attempted to extort Pocklington's associates for a ransom, but was prevented from doing so after police went into the house and opened fire, wounding both him and Pocklington. Both men recovered, and Petrović was later deported.
20 April 1982		Carmen Mitchell	Mirko Petrović	Edmonton, Canada	Unknown	Released	Peter Pocklington is a Canadian entrepreneur who was taken hostage along with his wife Eva, maid Carmen Mitchell and babysitter Joseph Wright by a Yugoslav immigrant who planned to kidnap Eva. After she escaped and Mitchell and Wright were released, Petrović attempted to extort Pocklington's associates for a ransom, but was prevented from doing so after police went into the house and opened fire, wounding both him and Pocklington. Both men recovered, and Petrović was later deported.
20 April 1982		Joseph Wright	Mirko Petrović	Edmonton, Canada	Unknown	Released	Peter Pocklington is a Canadian entrepreneur who was taken hostage along with his wife Eva, maid Carmen Mitchell and babysitter Joseph Wright by a Yugoslav immigrant who planned to kidnap Eva. After she escaped and Mitchell and Wright were released, Petrović attempted to extort Pocklington's associates for a ransom, but was prevented from doing so after police went into the house and opened fire, wounding both him and Pocklington. Both men recovered, and Petrović was later deported.
27 April 1982		Frances Julia Slater	John Earl Bush, J.B. Parker, Alphonso Cave and Terry Wayne Johnson	Stuart, Florida, United States	18	Murdered	Convenience store clerk and the granddaughter of Outboard Marine Corporation chairman Ralph Evinrude. Slater was kidnapped from a convenience store where she worked, and the four men robbed and killed her. One of them, Bush, was executed in 1996, while for the rest, Parker had his death sentence commuted to life, Johnson was sentenced to life and Cave died of unknown causes while on death row in 2023 before he could be executed.
2 May 1982		John E. Irving	Stephen Gerald Childs	New Brunswick, Canada	50	Released	Canadian businessman who was kidnapped by a gunman and held hostage for ten hours before being rescued unharmed.
25 May 1982		Susan Singh	Michael Singh	(United States) Kansas City, Missouri, U.S.	34	Murdered	Abducted from her home and murdered by her husband, Michael Singh. Susan was bludgeoned to death with a blunt instrument. Her husband was observed attempting to bury her body in a shallow grave and apprehended following a short chase.
17 July 1982		Krista Harrison	Robert Anthony Buell	(United States) Marshallville, Ohio, U.S.	11	Murdered	The victim was abducted by van at a park near her home. She was found six days later. Buell was convicted in 1984.
30 July 1982		Susan Maxwell	Robert Black	Coldstream, Scotland	11	Murdered	The second confirmed victim of paedophilic serial killer Robert Black. She was abducted while walking home from playing tennis and was found dead in a copse by the roadside on 12 August.
22 August 1982		Richard "Ricky" Stetson	John Joubert	(United States) Portland, Maine, U.S.	11	Murdered	Stetson had gone jogging on the 3.5 mile long Back Cove Trail in Portland, Maine. When he had not returned by dark, his parents called the police. The next day, a motorist discovered the boy's body on the side of US I-295.
25 September 1982		Lisa Ann Millican	Alvin and Judith Neelley	(United States) Rome, Georgia, U.S.	13	Murdered	The couple abducted Millican outside a gaming arcade in the Riverbend Mall and held her captive for three days, during which time both Neelleys sexually assaulted her multiple times. On 28 September, Judith Neelley poisoned her with an injection of Drano, before shooting her and throwing her over a cliff when that failed to kill her.
4 October 1982		Janice Chatman	Alvin and Judith Neelley	(United States) Rome, Georgia, U.S.	23	Murdered	A young engaged couple from Rome. Both were abducted by Judith Neelley. Hancock was shot and left for dead in woodland, whereas Chatman was sexually assaulted and murdered by both Judith and her husband. Both were sentenced to life imprisonment.
4 October 1982		John Hancock	Alvin and Judith Neelley	(United States) Rome, Georgia, U.S.	26	Survived	A young engaged couple from Rome. Both were abducted by Judith Neelley. Hancock was shot and left for dead in woodland, whereas Chatman was sexually assaulted and murdered by both Judith and her husband. Both were sentenced to life imprisonment.

== 1983 ==
Date	Image	Victim(s)	Abductor(s)	Location	Age of victim(s)	Outcome	Notes
1983		Enrique Mansilla	Unknown	Liberia	25	Released	Argentine former racing driver and later diamond hunter who was kidnapped and held captive in Liberia, but later released without incident.
4 January 1983		Louise Bell	Dieter Pfennig	Hackham, South Australia	10	Murdered	Louise Bell was abducted from her home in the early morning on 4 January 1983. Her body has not been found, but Raymond Geesing was convicted of her murder in 1984 and served 17 months in prison before being exonerated. 33 years later, Dieter Pfennig, who had previously been convicted of murdering a child, was convicted of Louise Bell's murder.
11 January 1983		Bobby Hester	Black Jesus cult	(United States) Memphis, Tennessee, U.S.	34	Murdered	Police officer taken captive by the so-called "Black Jesus" sect while investigating a theft near the sect's headquarters. Hester's kidnapping led to a standoff between police and the cult which lasted until the house was raided on 13 January, at which point Hester's dead body was found. He had been beaten and stabbed to death by members of the sect several hours earlier.
c. 23 February 1983		St. Louis Jane Doe	Unknown	(United States) St. Louis, Missouri, U.S.	Between 8 and 11	Murdered	The decapitated body of a girl was found on 28 February 1983. She had been bound, raped and strangled. Her murder remains unsolved and her body has never been identified.
25 February 1983		Jeanine Nicarico	Brian Dugan	(United States) Naperville, Illinois, U.S.	10	Murdered	Nicarico was abducted from her home by an intruder. Her body was found two days later. Three individuals—Rolando Cruz, Alejandro Hernandez and Stephen Buckley—were later arrested for her murder. Two of these individuals were later convicted of Nicarico's murder, although their convictions were overturned in 1995. Cruz, Hernandez and Buckley filed a civil suit for wrongful prosecution against DuPage County; they were awarded a $3.5 million civil settlement on 26 September 2000. Serial killer Brian Dugan later pleaded guilty to murdering Nicarico.
26 February 1983		Marjorie Mason	Barry Lee Fairchild	(United States) Arkansas, U.S.	22	Murdered	Marjorie "Greta" Mason, 22, was kidnapped and murdered.
2 April 1983		Michelle Marie Newton	Debra Newton	(United States) Louisville, Kentucky, U.S.	3	Raised by abductor; rescued by authorities following a tip-off	Newton was abducted at age 3 by her own mother, Debra Newton, on 2 April 1983, under the pretext of relocating ahead of a planned relocation with her father, Joseph Newton, from Louisville, Kentucky to Georgia, where he had found work. When Joseph arrived in Georgia, they had already vanished. A nationwide search ensued and for a time, Debra was in the FBI’s Top 8 Most Wanted parental-kidnapping fugitives list. For 42 years, authorities could not locate the mother and daughter, who had moved to Florida, where Debra raised Michelle and has since remarried and changed her name to Sharon Nealy. The search continued until 2000 when the case was dismissed after prosecutors could not reach Joseph. In 2005, Michelle was removed from the nationwide missing child databases. It was only in 2016 that the case was reopened after a family member asked officials and a grand jury reindicted Debra in 2017, but authorities were still unable to find her and Michelle. In 2024, the National Center for Missing and Exploited Children (NCMEC) released an age-progression picture of what Michelle would look like at age 45 in hopes of locating her. On 24 November 2025, Debra was arrested in a retirement community in Marion County, Florida, following a Crimestoppers tip-off. Michelle, now 46 years old, was informed afterwards of her identity and abduction and has since been reunited on Thanksgiving with her father. Debra has been indicted and arraigned in court in Louisville and was released after a relative posted a bond.
May–July 1983		John Brandenburg	Larry Eyler	(United States) Lake Village, Indiana, U.S.	19	Murdered	Two teenagers murdered by a serial killer in the early 1980s. Brandenburg and Bibbs were respectively unidentified until 2021 and 2023, and were known as the Newton County John Does prior to their identification.
May–July 1983		Keith Bibbs	Larry Eyler	(United States) Lake Village, Indiana, U.S.	16	Murdered	Two teenagers murdered by a serial killer in the early 1980s. Brandenburg and Bibbs were respectively unidentified until 2021 and 2023, and were known as the Newton County John Does prior to their identification.
June 1983		Unnamed school girl	Bartolomeo Gagliano	Savona, Italy	Schoolage	Rescued	A schoolgirl was kidnapped by Italian serial killer Bartolomeo Gagliano.
5 June 1983		Richard Kelvin	Bevan Spencer von Einem	Adelaide, Australia	15	Murdered	Kelvin, the son of broadcaster Rob Kelvin, was dragged into a car near his home in North Adelaide. His body was found near Kersbrook in July. It appeared that he was kept alive and sexually abused for around five weeks after his abduction before dying from blood loss resulting from being sodomized with a large blunt instrument. A man named Bevan von Einem was convicted of the crime, but police believe he did not act alone and have linked Kelvin's death to the so-called "Family Murders", a series of similar crimes allegedly committed by a child abuse ring known as "The Family" of which von Einem is thought to have been a member.
16 June 1983		Adella Marie Simmons	John Marek and Raymond Dewayne Wigley	(United States) Broward County, Florida, U.S.	45	Murdered	A 45-year-old mother of two daughters who was abducted, sexually assaulted and strangled. Both perpetrators were sentenced to death for her murder. Marek was executed via lethal injection on 19 August 2009; Wigley was killed in prison in 2000.
6 July 1983		Tammy Lynn Leppert	Unknown	(United States) Rockledge, Florida, U.S.	18	Unknown	Leppert was a former child actress and model who disappeared in unknown circumstances.
8 July 1983		Caroline Hogg	Robert Black	Portobello, Edinburgh, Scotland	5	Murdered	The third confirmed victim of paedophilic serial killer Robert Black. She was abducted while playing outside her home. She was found dead in a ditch ten days later.
24 August 1983		Guillermo Patricio Kelly	Aníbal Gordon	Argentina	62	Released	Leader of the Nationalist Liberation Alliance from 1953 and 1955, noted for guiding the group into dropping its antisemitic practises. After being exiled from the country by the Perón government, he returned in 1983, only to be kidnapped and released a few hours later. Aníbal Gordon, a suspected member of a right-wing death squad, would later be convicted of this crime, among several others.
18 September 1983		Danny Joe Eberle	John Joubert	(United States) Bellevue, Nebraska, U.S.	13	Murdered	Eberle disappeared while delivering the Omaha World-Herald newspaper. He had delivered only three of the 70 newspapers on his route. His bicycle was discovered along with the rest of the newspapers at the fourth address of his route. There appeared to be no sign of a struggle. After a three-day search, Eberle's body was discovered in a patch of high grass alongside a gravel road.
20 October 1983		Colette Aram	Paul Hutchinson	Keyworth, Nottinghamshire, England	16	Murdered	A trainee hairdresser abducted, raped and strangled as she walked to her boyfriend's house in Keyworth, Nottinghamshire, on 30 October 1983. Her murder was the first case to be featured on the BBC television series Crimewatch. Aram's murderer, Paul Hutchinson, was arrested in 2009 and sentenced to life imprisonment on 25 January 2010.
23 November 1983		Don Tidey	Brendan McFarlane	(Republic of Ireland) Dublin, Ireland	48	Escaped	Tidey, the managing director for the Quinnsworth supermarket chain, was abducted by PIRA volunteer Brendan McFarlane at a bogus checkpoint near Dublin, while taking his daughter to school. McFarlane and three other men sent the Associated British Foods a photo of Tidey and demanding IR£5m for his release. The Garda Síochána and Irish Army searched for Tidey for 23 days and on 16 December, Tidey was located at Derreda Wood outside of Ballinamore, after PIRA volunteer Freddie Scappaticci allegedly helped to locate hiim. In what was called “Operation Santa Claus” the rescue team engaged Tidey's captors and a shootout ensued, resulting the deaths of Garda trainee recruit Gary Sheehan and Irish Army private Patrick Kelly, and Tidey escaping as he rolled down a hill and into the rescue team. All four captors escaped, but McFarlane was arrested on 16 January 1986 in the Netherlands.
13 December 1983		Christopher Walden	John Joubert	(United States) Papillion, Nebraska, U.S.	12	Murdered	Walden disappeared while walking to school. Walden's snow covered body was found two days later 5 miles (8 km) from town by 2 hunters. He had his throat cut so deeply he was nearly decapitated.

== 1984 ==
Date	Image	Victim(s)	Abductor(s)	Location	Age of victim(s)	Outcome	Notes
6 February 1984		Ravindra Mhatre	Jammu Kashmir Liberation Front	Birmingham, England	47–48	Murdered	Indian consular official who was kidnapped by Kashmiri militants in an attempt to secure the release from prison of Maqbool Bhat. His captors murdered him after their demands were not met, leaving his body 20 miles outside city limits.
16 March 1984		Tracy Marie Neef	Unknown	(United States) Thornton, Colorado, U.S.	7	Murdered	After being dropped off to Bertha Heid Elementary School by her mother, Tracy Neef was kidnapped by an unknown abductor between the school gate and front door. She was molested and strangled or suffocated, and was found at the Barker Reservoir later that day with her backpack and school supplies nearby; her case remains unsolved. James Benish, a retired police officer, affirmed that Neef's case may be linked to the unsolved murders of JonBenet Ramsey, also in Colorado, and Aleisea "Lacey" Woolsey Ruff in Hawaii. He noted that all three victims were young preteen girls, all were sexually assaulted and murdered in similar fashion, and that there were similarities in the manner and circumstances of the documented or apparent abduction. Neef's unsolved murder and Benish's suggestions of a possible serial killer, and potential connection with the other cases, were detailed in the A&E Networks true crime program "Hunting JonBenét's Killer: The Untold Story".
18 March 1984		Katsuhisa Ezaki	The Monster with 21 Faces	Nishinomiya, Japan	42	Escaped	Katsuhisa, the president of Japanese confectionery company Ezaki Glico, was abducted from his home by two armed men, who took him to a warehouse in Osaka Prefecture and demanded a ransom from Glico of 1 billion yen. Katsuhisa was held captive for three days before escaping on 21 March. The person or persons behind the kidnapping, known as "The Monster with 21 Faces", remains unidentified.
1 June 1984		Mark Tildesley	Sidney Cooke	Wokingham, Berkshire, England	7	Murdered	Tildesley disappeared while visiting a funfair in Wokingham, Berkshire, during the evening. He was lured away from the fair and his bicycle was found chained to railings nearby. In 1990 it emerged that he had been abducted, drugged, tortured, raped and murdered by a London-based paedophile gang.
5 July 1984		Jerry Howell	Robert Berdella	(United States) Kansas City, Missouri, U.S.	19	Murdered	The first known victim of serial killer Robert Berdella. Howell is believed to have died of either asphyxiation or an inability to breathe due to a combination of gagging and medication overdose following approximately twenty-eight hours of captivity and abuse.
7 July 1984		Layla Dawn Cummings	Richard Norman Rojem Jr.	(United States) Oklahoma, U.S.	7	Murdered	Cummings, formerly the stepdaughter of Rojem before he and Cummings's biological mother divorced, was abducted, raped and murdered by Rojem. Rojem was convicted of the murder and executed on June 27, 2024, after spending nearly 40 years on death row. Rojem was the longest-serving death row prisoner in Oklahoma at the time of his execution.
19 July 1984		Edith Rosenkranz	Glenn I. Wright and Dennis Moss	Washington, D.C., U.S.	60	Released	Edith, wife of wealthy Mexico City businessman Dr. George Rosenkranz, was kidnapped at gunpoint from the Washington-Sheraton Hotel during an American Contract Bridge League national tournament. She was returned unharmed two days later after her husband paid a ransom of US$1,000,000. The ransom money was later recovered and the two kidnappers were later convicted and sentenced, as was a third defendant, Orland D. Tolden.
29 August 1984		Elisabeth Fritzl	Josef Fritzl	Amstetten, Austria	18	Released	Elisabeth was held captive in a concealed corridor in the basement of the large family house by her father, Josef Fritzl, who physically assaulted, sexually abused, and raped her during her imprisonment. The abuse resulted in the birth of seven children and one miscarriage. One child died shortly after birth, three children joined their mother in captivity, and three were raised by Josef and his wife Rosemarie and reported to authorities as foundlings. Josef released Elisabeth and her three captive children in 2008 when one child became seriously ill. Fritzl was sentenced to life imprisonment in 2009 for charges of murder by negligence of his infant son/grandson, as well as the enslavement, incest, rape, coercion and false imprisonment of Elisabeth.
17 September 1984		Vicki Lynne Hoskinson	Frank Atwood	(United States) Tucson, Arizona, U.S.	8	Murdered	On 17 September, Vicki Hoskinson disappeared while out delivering a birthday card to her aunt. Frank Atwood, a sex offender on parole for abducting and sexually assaulting a young boy, was seen driving in the area and accident reconstruction experts linked Hoskinson's bike to Atwood's car. Atwood was charged with kidnapping and Hoskinson's body was later found in the Sonoran Desert. Atwood was executed in 2022.
18 September 1984		Sharon Baldeagle	Royal Russell Long	(United States) Eagle Butte, South Dakota, U.S.	12	Unknown	Baldeagle and Brokenleg were picked up by Long, a convicted sex offender and suspected serial killer, who drove them to his home in Evansville and sexually assaulted them at gunpoint. Brokenleg managed to escape and Long was arrested a week later, having fled to New Mexico. Baldeagle was never found and is believed to have been murdered. Long received two life sentences for kidnapping and indecent liberties with a minor.
18 September 1984		Sandi Brokenleg	Royal Russell Long	(United States) Eagle Butte, South Dakota, U.S.	15	Escaped	Baldeagle and Brokenleg were picked up by Long, a convicted sex offender and suspected serial killer, who drove them to his home in Evansville and sexually assaulted them at gunpoint. Brokenleg managed to escape and Long was arrested a week later, having fled to New Mexico. Baldeagle was never found and is believed to have been murdered. Long received two life sentences for kidnapping and indecent liberties with a minor.
9 October 1984		Kim Sue Leggett	Unknown	(United States) Mercedes, Texas, U.S.	21	Unknown	On 9 October, Kim Sue Leggett disappeared around 5 pm from her place of employment. She left behind a 1-year-old son and a husband. Kim's parents got two phone calls on the day she went missing. The caller said they had abducted Kim and wanted ransom. Later her parents also got a ransom note demanding $250,000. They never heard from the alleged kidnappers again.
3 November 1984		Lisa McVey	Bobby Joe Long	(United States) Tampa, Florida, U.S.	17	Released	Abducted and sexually assaulted by serial killer Bobby Joe Long. McVey was released after 26 hours of captivity. Information McVey provided to authorities led to Long's arrest on 16 November 1984.
6 November 1984		Kylie Maybury	Gregory Keith Davies	Preston, Victoria, Australia	6	Murdered	Schoolgirl abducted on the night of the Melbourne Cup Day in 1984. Her body, showing signs of rape and strangulation, was found the next day. Her case remained unsolved until 2017, when convicted sex offender Gregory Keith Davies was convicted and sentenced to life imprisonment for her murder.
12 November 1984		Margaret "Peggy Sue" Altes	Unknown	(United States) Indianapolis, Indiana, U.S.	11	Murdered	Peggy Sue Altes vanished from a park near her Indianapolis home, and was found by hunters in woods in Hancock County, Indiana, just under a week later. She had been sexually assaulted and stabbed. Her brother-in-law Jerry Watkins was arrested and convicted, but absolved of the crime and freed from prison in 2000 when he was ruled out by DNA evidence. Joseph McCormick was then charged with her murder in 2001 and admitted to molesting her after her kidnapping, but denied killing her and had charges reduced after cooperating with investigators. The following year, Kenneth Munson, brother Hugh Munson and William L. Beever were charged with Altes' murder, but charges were dropped against the last two. Kenneth Munson pled guilty to battery charges against Altes and was sentenced, but the murder remains officially unsolved.
18 December 1984		Unnamed 9 year old girl	Daniel Camargo Barbosa	Quevedo, Los Ríos, Ecuador	9	Murdered	A 9 year old girl was kidnapped and murdered by Colombian serial killer Daniel Camargo Barbosa.
20 December 1984		Jonelle Matthews	Steven Pankey	(United States) Greeley, Colorado, U.S.	12	Murdered	After performing in a holiday concert at IntraWest Bank of Denver as a member of Greeley's Franklin Middle School Choir, Jonelle arrived at her Greeley home after getting a ride from her friend DeeAnn Ross and DeeAnn's father. Shortly after receiving a phone call after 8.30 pm, she was discovered missing by her father an hour later. Her body was not found until 24 July 2019, nearly 35 years after the disappearance, with a gunshot wound to her head. Police later identified the kidnapper as Steven Dana Pankey, a former Greeley resident who ran for governor in Idaho in 2014 and 2018, and for lieutenant governor in 2010. On 13 October 2020, Pankey was indicted on charges of murdering and kidnapping Matthews; he was later extradited to Colorado. After a first trial beginning October of 2021 ended in a mistrial, he was found guilty and sentenced to life imprisonment on October 31, 2022.
22 December 1984		Deirdre Sainsbury	Colin Campbell	Roehampton, England	29	Murdered	Abducted while hitchhiking in Roehampton, West London; her nude, mutilated body was discovered discarded on a golf course in Denham, Buckinghamshire. She had been bludgeoned about the head and strangled.

== 1985 ==
Date	Image	Victim(s)	Abductor(s)	Location	Age of victim(s)	Outcome	Notes
19 January 1985		Toni Jean Gibbs	Faryion Wardrip	(United States) Wichita Falls, Texas, U.S.	23	Murdered	Gibbs, a nurse, was abducted after completing her shift at a hospital. She was kidnapped and her abandoned car was found soon after. Her body was found a month later. Faryion Wardrip was convicted of her murder in 1999.
7 February 1985		Enrique Camarena	Guadalajara Cartel	La Angostura, Mexico	37	Murdered	Camarena, a Mexican American DEA official, was abducted by drug lords and tortured. He was found dead on 5 March 1985.
11 July 1985		Suzanne Marie Collins	Sedley Alley	(United States) Millington, Tennessee, U.S.	19	Murdered	USMC lance corporal-in-training who was kidnapped while jogging near Naval Support Activity Mid-South. Her body, showing signs of rape and blunt force trauma, was found the next day. Sedley Alley was subsequently arrested, convicted and executed in 2006.
11 August 1985		Beverly St. George	Johnny Leartice Robinson	(United States) St. Johns County, Florida, U.S.	31	Murdered	St. George's car had broken down by Interstate 95 and she was picked up by Robinson, who drove her to a nearby cemetery where he raped and shot her. He later claimed that they had consensual sex and he shot her by accident.
12 September 1985		Raymond Fife	Timothy Combs and Danny Lee Hill	(United States) Warren, Ohio, U.S.	12	Murdered	A boy scout who was abducted, raped and murdered.
20 September 1985		Ellen Blau	Faryion Wardrip	(United States) Wichita Falls, Texas, U.S.	21	Murdered	Blau was abducted after working as a waitress. Faryion Wardrip was convicted of her murder in 1999.
9 October 1985		Sarah Pryor	Unknown	(United States) Wayland, Massachusetts, U.S.	9	Murdered	Pryor disappeared while walking through her neighborhood. Her fate was unknown until 1998 when DNA tests proved that skull fragments discovered in the woods belonged to her. Her killer was never identified.
9 November 1985		Alexander Olive	Ulysses Roberson	(United States) South Lake Tahoe, California, U.S.	4	Murdered	Olive's body was never found, but his father was convicted of his abduction and murder.
21 November 1985		Laura Murphy	John Brennan Crutchley	(United States) Malabar, Florida, U.S.	19	Escaped	Murphy was picked up while hitchhiking by suspected serial killer John Crutchley, who choked her unconscious, raped her repeatedly and drank her blood. After being held captive for an entire night, Murphy escaped through a bathroom window and filed charges against Crutchley for kidnapping and rape.

== 1986 ==
Date	Image	Victim(s)	Abductor(s)	Location	Age of victim(s)	Outcome	Notes
14 January 1986		Gabriela Ceppi	Roberto José Carmona	Villa Carlos Paz, Argentina	16	Murdered	Ceppi was robbed along with two friends by serial killer Roberto José Carmona, who then kidnapped and murdered her.
17 March 1986		Wanda Romines	Stephen Michael West and Ronald David Martin	(United States) Union County, Tennessee, U.S.	51	Murdered	A mother and daughter overpowered and murdered while being held hostage in their own home. Wanda and Sheila Romines were targeted by West and Martin, who initially gained entry to the premises upon Martin—a school friend of Sheila's who also knew her mother—borrowing money. Both were overpowered and stabbed to death, with Sheila also being raped prior to her murder.
17 March 1986		Sheila Romines	Stephen Michael West and Ronald David Martin	(United States) Union County, Tennessee, U.S.	15	Murdered	A mother and daughter overpowered and murdered while being held hostage in their own home. Wanda and Sheila Romines were targeted by West and Martin, who initially gained entry to the premises upon Martin—a school friend of Sheila's who also knew her mother—borrowing money. Both were overpowered and stabbed to death, with Sheila also being raped prior to her murder.
23 March 1986		Richard Chadek III	Unknown	(United States) Omaha, Nebraska, U.S.	13	Murdered	Chadek disappeared while riding his bike near his home. His bike was found in a bank parking lot. His body was discovered on Easter Sunday 31 March. He was found in a field northwest of Omaha and had been strangled. It was determined he was kept alive for several days after his kidnapping.
26 March 1986		Sarah Harper	Robert Black	Morley, West Yorkshire, England	10	Murdered	The final confirmed victim of serial killer Robert Black. She was abducted while buying a loaf of bread at a corner shop 100 yards from her home. Her body was found in the River Trent on 19 April.
April 1986		Unnamed 19-year-old woman	William Lewis Reece	(United States) Columbus, Ohio, U.S.	19	Escaped	A surviving victim of serial killer William Lewis Reece. This young woman was driving to her job as an aerobics instructor when her vehicle stalled along Interstate 35. Reece lured her into his vehicle upon the promise of taking her to a payphone; the woman was restrained and raped, but later escaped her attacker.
6 April 1986		Anthonette Cayedito	Unknown	(United States) Gallup, New Mexico, U.S.	9	Unknown	Cayedito was kidnapped from her home. She was profiled on Unsolved Mysteries a few years after her disappearance. It is believed that she phoned 911 a year after her kidnapping in a desperate attempt to be rescued. She may have also been seen by a waitress in Carson City a few years later. The girl has never been located.
3 May 1986		Sandra Court	Unknown	Bournemouth, England	29	Unknown	Court came home after a night out in the early hours of 3 May 1986, but no one was present to let her in. She was last seen walking barefoot, appearing slightly drunk, at around 2:45 am. A few hours later her body was found in a water-filled ditch in a field several miles away, indicating she was abducted by someone and taken there by car. Her murder is unsolved, although police believe the case is linked to the disappearance of Suzy Lamplugh a few weeks later (see separate entry below) and that both were abducted and killed by John Cannan. A pay-and-display parking ticket proves he travelled to Bournemouth that day, and two hairs discovered in his car in the early 2000s matched Court's DNA. The chance of the hairs belonging to someone other than Court were 40,000 to 1.
14 May 1986		Toh Hong Huat	Unknown	Singapore	12	Unknown	Toh and Keh disappeared while on their way to Owen Primary School. Despite an extensive search and sightings, the boys have never been found and the case remains unsolved. The boys have also been dubbed as the "McDonald's Boys", due to McDonald's in Singapore offering a S$100,000 reward for any information on the boys.
14 May 1986		Keh Chin Ann	Unknown	Singapore	12	Unknown	Toh and Keh disappeared while on their way to Owen Primary School. Despite an extensive search and sightings, the boys have never been found and the case remains unsolved. The boys have also been dubbed as the "McDonald's Boys", due to McDonald's in Singapore offering a S$100,000 reward for any information on the boys.
24 May 1986		Michelle Dorr	Hadden Clark	(United States) Silver Spring, Maryland, U.S.	6	Murdered	A girl was kidnapped while playing outside her home.
28 July 1986		Suzy Lamplugh	Unknown (the police named John Cannan as the man who they believed abducted and murdered her in 2002)	Fulham, London, England	25	Unknown, but declared dead in 1993 and presumed murdered	Estate agent Lamplugh disappeared after attending an appointment with a supposed client named "Mr Kipper". Later that night her abandoned car was found several streets away. Witnesses stated they saw her with a smartly dressed man holding champagne outside the house for sale, and there were also sightings of her arguing with a man and fighting with him in a BMW car speeding away from near the scene. Declared dead in 1993, police are adamant that her abductor was John Cannan, who was released from a nearby prison three days earlier, owned a BMW like the one seen, and had abducted and murdered Shirley Banks in Bristol in 1987. He is also suspected of being the House for sale rapist, who raped around 20 women in houses for sale in the west Midlands in 1979 and 1980.
19 August 1986		Samantha Knight	Michael Guider	Bondi, New South Wales, Australia	9	Died accidentally	Paedophile Guider abducted Knight from her home and drugged her with Temazepam in order to molest her, accidentally giving her a fatal overdose. Guider was jailed for Knight's manslaughter in 2001.
30 September 1986		Mordechai Vanunu	Mossad	Rome, Italy	31	Released	Vanunu, an Israeli nuclear whistleblower, was lured to Italy from London, where he was abducted by Mossad and brought back to Israel, where he was convicted of treason and espionage. He served 18 years in prison, eleven of which were in solitary confinement.
25 November 1986		Josefina Rivera	Gary M. Heidnik	(United States) North Philadelphia, U.S.	25	Released	25-year-old Josefina Rivera was kidnapped. After her release she published two books on her ordeal.
25 November 1986		Kristie Granado	Todd Kohlhepp	(United States) Tempe, Arizona, U.S.	14	Released	Granado was abducted at gunpoint by future serial killer Kohlhepp, who was a year older than her, and brought back to his home, where Kohlhepp tied her up, taped her mouth shut, and raped her. He then walked her home and threatened to kill her family if she told anyone. Granado reported the crime and Kohlhepp later pleaded guilty to kidnapping.
23 December 1986		Lisa Thomas	Gary M. Heidnik	(United States) North Philadelphia, U.S.	19	Released	19-year-old Lisa Thomas was kidnapped.

== 1987 ==
Date	Image	Victim(s)	Abductor(s)	Location	Age of victim(s)	Outcome	Notes
1987		Kathy Hobbs	Michael Lee Lockhart	(United States) Las Vegas, Nevada, U.S.	16	Unknown	16-year-old Kathy Hobbs was abducted in Las Vegas and was never seen again.
12 January 1987		Terry Waite	Islamic Jihad Organization	Beirut, Lebanon	47	Released	Waite was the envoy of the Archbishop of Canterbury to Lebanon in 1987; he was sent to negotiate the release of four British citizens, but was kidnapped himself.
18 January 1987		Jacqueline Askins	Gary M. Heidnik	(United States) North Philadelphia, U.S.	18	Rescued/escaped	18-year-old Jacqueline Askins was kidnapped.
19 March 1987		Susan Michelbacher	Paul Ezra Rhoades	(United States) Idaho, U.S.	34	Murdered	On 19 March 1987, serial killer Paul Ezra Rhoades killed his third victim, 34-year-old Susan Michelbacher, whose body was found two days after her death and presumed disappearance. Rhoades was later convicted of murdering Michelbacher and two other women in Idaho, and sentenced to death. He was executed in 2011.
23 March 1987		Agnes Adams	Gary M. Heidnik	(United States) Pennsylvania, U.S.	24	Released	On 23 March 1987, serial killer Gary M. Heidnik kidnapped Agnes Adams. She called the police and he was arrested.
10 April 1987		Kathy Annette Allen	Andrew Six and Donald Petary	(United States) Ottumwa, Iowa, U.S.	12	Murdered	On 10 April 1987, serial killer Andrew Six and his uncle Donald Petary brutally attacked a local family in Ottumwa, Iowa, and kidnapped the family's 12-year-old second daughter, Kathy Allen, and forcibly took her across state lines to Missouri, where they murdered her by stabbing her in the neck. Six and Petary were both sentenced to death in Missouri for state murder charges, in addition to 200 years' jail for federal kidnapping charges. Petary died in 1998 while on death row, while Six, who was posthumously identified as the real killer of a 1984 Iowa triple homicide, was executed by lethal injection on August 20, 1997.
26 April 1987		Kerrick Majors	Donald Ray Middlebrooks, Tammy Middlebrooks, Robert Roger Brewington Jr.	(United States) East Nashville, Tennessee, U.S.	14	Murdered	On 26 April 1987, 14-year-old Kerrick Majors was kidnapped, tortured, and murdered by Donald Ray Middlebrooks, Tammy Middlebrooks, and Robert Roger Brewington Jr., after he and his friends accidentally broke a $2 vase at a flea market in East Nashville, Tennessee. Donald was sentenced to death for the crime, while his accomplices, both juveniles, were sentenced to life in prison.
c. 1 July 1987		Three unnamed children	Dennis Ferguson and Alexandria George Brookes	Sydney, Australia	8, 7, 6	Rescued	Three siblings—two male, one female—abducted from Sydney and flown to Brisbane by Dennis Ferguson and his lover, Alexandria George Brookes. The children were repeatedly sexually assaulted at two locations over three days before they were rescued by police. Ferguson was later convicted of the children's kidnapping and sexual abuse and sentenced to fourteen years' imprisonment.
4 July 1987		Helen Kunz	Christopher Jacobs	(United States) Wausau, Wisconsin, U.S.	70	Murdered	On 4 July 1987, an assailant shot four members of the Kunz family dead on their farm near Wausau, Wisconsin, and abducted 70-year-old Helen Kunz. She was found shot to death in a swamp nine months later. Farmer Christopher Jacobs III was acquitted of the murders and later bragged that he had killed the family "to prove he was a man"; he was ultimately convicted of kidnapping Helen Kunz, but was protected from further murder charges by double jeopardy.
4 July 1987		Michael Houghton	Scott Hain, Robert Lambert	(United States) Tulsa, Oklahoma, U.S.	27	Murdered	Houghton and Sanders were carjacked and taken hostage by two teenagers, Scott Hain and Robert Lambert, who drove them several miles before stopping, robbing them at gunpoint, forcing them into the trunk of the car, and burning them alive. Both men were sentenced to death. Scott Hain was executed in 2003. He was the last juvenile offender to be executed in the United States before the Roper v. Simmons banned capital punishment for juveniles in the United States. Lambert was resentenced to life without parole after he was found to be mentally disabled.
4 July 1987		Laura Sanders	Scott Hain, Robert Lambert	(United States) Tulsa, Oklahoma, U.S.	22	Murdered	
9 July 1987		Jerri Jones	Terry Hyatt	(United States) Derita, Charlotte, North Carolina, U.S.	19	Murdered	On 9 July 1987, 19-year-old Jerri Jones was kidnapped and murdered by serial killer Terry Hyatt.
4 August 1987		Carlina White	Annugetta "Ann" Pettway	(United States) New York City, U.S.	19 days	Raised by abductor	White was taken from Harlem Hospital Center as an infant and raised by Pettway. She was reunited with her family in January 2011, 23 years later, in the longest known non-parental abduction.
9 September 1987		Gerrit Jan Heijn	Ferdi Elsas	Bloemendaal, Netherlands	56	Murdered	Heijn was a Dutch businessman, the top executive of Ahold, Holland's largest retailer. He was killed shortly after his abduction. Elsas pretended the victim was still alive and received a ransom. He was caught after spending one of the banknotes of the ransom, whose numbers had been recorded. He was released in 2001 after serving a prison sentence but was killed in a road accident.
15 December 1987		Anthony Milano	Frank Chester, Richard Laird	(United States) Bucks County, Pennsylvania, U.S.	26	Murdered	On 15 December 1987, 26-year-old Anthony Milano encountered Frank Chester and Richard Laird at a bar in Bucks County, Pennsylvania. After agreeing to drive the men home, they forced Milano to drive them around in his car for 45 minutes. Eventually, he stopped the car in a wooded lot and was attacked. The attackers slashed his throat with a knife so deeply that he was nearly decapitated. He died at the scene, and his car was set ablaze. Both Chester and Laird were convicted of the murder. Both were sentenced to death; however, Chester's sentence was later commuted to life without parole.

== 1988 ==
Date	Image	Victim(s)	Abductor(s)	Location	Age of victim(s)	Outcome	Notes
29 March 1988		Christopher Bryson	Robert Berdella	(United States) Kansas City, Missouri, U.S.	22	Escaped from captor	A male prostitute abducted, held captive and subjected to sexual abuse and torture for four days by serial killer Robert Berdella. Bryson escaped his captor by loosening his right wrist from his restraints, untying the binding to his left wrist, then burning through his ankle restraints using a book of matches Berdella had inadvertently left within his reach. Berdella was arrested the same day.
1 April 1988		April Tinsley	John Miller	(United States) Fort Wayne, Indiana, U.S.	8	Murdered	Eight-year-old girl who was abducted, raped and strangled to death. Thirty years later, John Miller was arrested after being implicated by DNA analysis. He pleaded guilty and was sentenced to 80 years in prison.
18 June 1988		Marie Wilks	Unknown	Tewkesbury, England	22	Murdered	Pregnant woman abducted by an unidentified assailant while using the emergency telephone on the side of the M50 motorway. Her body was found two days later, but her murder is unsolved. A man, Eddie Browning, was originally convicted of her abduction and murder but was released on appeal in 1994 after 5 years imprisonment.
4 July 1988		Wojciech Pryczek	Mariusz Trynkiewicz	Piotrków Trybunalski, Poland	13	Murdered	On 4 July 1988, 13-year-old Wojciech Pryczek was lured into the apartment of Mariusz Trynkiewicz, who then strangled him and buried his corpse in the forest. Trynkiewicz had been released from prison earlier that day in connection with the care of his sick mother. He was later sentenced to death for the murder of Pryczek and three other boys, with his sentence subsequently being commuted to 25 years in prison.
10 September 1988		Jaclyn Dowaliby	Unknown	(United States) Chicago, Illinois, U.S.	7	Murdered	Jaclyn Dowaliby disappeared from her bedroom on the night of 9–10 September 1988. Evidence suggested the intruder entered through the house's basement window, then took the sleeping Jaclyn from her bed and escaped through the kitchen door. Jaclyn's body was found in Blue Island on 14 September. Police at one point suspected that the kidnapping was staged to cover up Jaclyn's murder by her parents and her father was convicted of murdering her, but was exonerated after serving just over a year in prison.
12 September 1988		Melissa Ann Tremblay	Unknown	(United States) Massachusetts, U.S.	11	Murdered	Tremblay was abducted from outside a social club where she had gone with her mother and her mother's boyfriend in September 1988 and was later found dead on the tracks of the Boston and Maine Railroad. A suspect named Marvin McClendon was brought to trial in 2023, but his first trial ended in a mistrial and he was ultimately found not guilty in November 2024.
20 September 1988		Tara Calico	Unknown	(United States) Belen, New Mexico, U.S.	19	Unknown	Calico disappeared near her home after taking her usual bike ride. A missing persons poster claimed she was being followed by a 1953–54 Ford Pickup and was never heard from again. No sign of Calico was found until on 15 June 1989 when a woman found a Polaroid photo of an unidentified young girl and boy, bound and gagged, in a convenience store parking lot in Port St. Joe, Florida with a white pickup truck parked next to it. Calico's family believes she is the girl in the photo, but this has not been confirmed. It is unclear whether Calico is still alive.
19 November 1988		Michaela Garecht	Unknown	(United States) Hayward, California, U.S.	9	Unknown	Garecht was abducted by a Caucasian male thought to be 18–24 years old. She rode to a small neighborhood market on her scooter. When she tried to grab her scooter, a man forced her into his car. She was never seen or heard from again, but on 21 December 2020, David Emery Misch was arrested and charged with her abduction and murder, based on fingerprint matches on the scooter.
21 November 1988		Gordon Church	Michael Anthony Archuleta, Lance Conway Wood	(United States) Millard County, Utah, U.S.	28	Murdered	On 21 November 1988, while on his way to meet friends for a meal prior to Thanksgiving holiday, 28-year-old Gordon Ray Church encountered Michael Anthony Archuleta and Lance Conway Wood at a 7-Eleven in Cedar City, Utah. After the group drove to a secluded area in Cedar Canyon, Church revealed that he was gay. He was subsequently kidnapped, raped, tortured, and ultimately murdered in a secluded area in Millard County, Utah. Church died in the early morning hours of 22 November; his body was dumped in a shallow grave and found the following day. Archuleta and Wood were arrested after the latter confessed to his parole officer; both were charged and convicted of Church's murder. Archuleta and Wood were sentenced to death and life imprisonment respectively.
25 November 1988		Junko Furuta	Hiroshi Miyano, Jō Ogura, Shinji Minato, Yasushi Watanabe	Tokyo, Japan	17	Murdered	Four perpetrators with a history of abduction and gang rape attacked Furuta while she was riding home on her bike. She was held captive for 40 days in the house where Minato lived with his parents. Torture over the subsequent days included gang-rape, starvation, forced alcohol ingestion, beatings, and burnings. The four perpetrators brought in two more boys to participate in the rapes. The rapes diminished as Furuta's wounds became rancid. The final beating began with Miyano pouring lighter fluid on Furuta and setting her on fire. This attack reportedly lasted two hours, finally killing her. The perpetrators dumped her body in a drum and filled it with wet concrete. The perpetrators' sentences ranged from juvenile detention to 20 years in prison. Minato's parents were ordered to pay ¥50 million to Furuta's parents for not reporting the crimes.
13 December 1988		Joaquin Esteves	Orlando Cruz Vasquez	(United States) San Jose, California, U.S.	64	Murdered	A suspect was convicted of the victim's murder, yet no body was ever recovered.
27 December 1988		Sharon Wills	Mr Cruel	Melbourne, Victoria, Australia	10	Released	A ten-year-old child abducted from the suburb of Ringwood, Melbourne by serial child rapist and suspected child murderer Mr Cruel. Wills was released after approximately eighteen hours of captivity.

== 1989 ==
Date	Image	Victim(s)	Abductor(s)	Location	Age of victim(s)	Outcome	Notes
1 January 1989		Stompie Seipei	Bodyguards of Winnie Mandela a.k.a. Mandela United Football Club	Gauteng, South Africa	14	Murdered	A United Democratic Front (UDF) activist from Parys, South Africa abducted on 29 December 1988. He was murdered on 1 January 1989.
1989		Unnamed 30-year-old woman	Unidentified serial killer	Järvenpää, Finland	30	Survived	In 1989, an intoxicated 30-year-old woman exited a restaurant in Järvenpää and was approached by a man who offered her a ride, during which the woman was offered alcohol and pills before being driven to a forest area. Although the woman survived the encounter, the victim's mother later revealed that she had died of natural causes years later. In 2017, it was published in the media that this case may have been connected to the Hausjärvi Gravel Pit Murders; the circumstances of this case highly resembled those of Helena Meriläinen's abduction in 1990.
14 January 1989		Paul Vanden Boeynants	Patrick Haemers and his gang	Belgium	69	Released	Vanden Boeynants, a Belgian politician, was kidnapped, and was released one month after his abduction when a ransom was paid.
22 March 1989		Ann Marie Harrison	Michael Anthony Taylor; Roderick Nunley	(United States) Raytown, Missouri, U.S.	15	Murdered	As she waited for the school bus outside her home in Raytown, Missouri, on March 22, 1989, fifteen-year-old Ann Marie Harrison was kidnapped by two men who raped and murdered her. Michael Anthony Taylor and Roderick Nunley were found guilty of first-degree murder, sentenced to execution by lethal injection, and executed in 2014 and 2015, respectively.
9–10 April 1989		Heidi Paakkonen	David Tamihere	Coromandel Peninsula, New Zealand	21	Murdered	Swedish tourists Paakkonen and her fiancée Urban Höglin disappeared while backpacking through the Coromandel forests. David Tamihere, a wanted rapist camping nearby, was convicted of their murders; it is believed that he murdered Höglin, then abducted Paakkonen and raped and murdered her. Höglin's body was found the year after the trial in circumstances which contradicted part of the prosecution case, but the court of appeal ruled in 2024 that the rest of the evidence proved Tamihere's guilt beyond reasonable doubt. Paakkonen's body remains undiscovered.
11 April 1989		Phang Tee Wah	Ibrahim Masod and Liow Han Heng	Yishun, Singapore	56	Murdered	56-year-old Phang Tee Wah was kidnapped by Liow Han Heng and Ibrahim Masod, who held Phang captive at Liow's Yishun flat before strangling him to death and disposing of his body at Pasir Ris. Despite Phang's death, the kidnappers attempted to extort a S$1 million ransom from his son and wife, and also sold Phang's watch for S$6,200. The two kidnappers were later arrested and charged with kidnapping and murder, and both sentenced to death in July 1992. However, Liow died from a heart attack in August 1993 while on death row, and thus Ibrahim became the sole kidnapper of the case to be officially executed on 29 July 1994 after failing to appeal his capital sentence.
17 July 1989		John McAnulty	Provisional Irish Republican Army	(Republic of Ireland) Dundalk, Ireland	48	Murdered	McAnulty was a Northern Irish grain importer who was kidnapped from a pub and subsequently murdered for being an alleged informant.
28 July 1989		Abdel Karim Obeid	Israeli commandos	Jibchit, Lebanon	32	Released	Hezbollah member and Imam who was kidnapped from his home by Israeli soldiers on 28 July 1989. Two other Hezbollah members were abducted that same night, while Obeid's wife was left bound and gagged in the closet. He was released in a prisoner exchange in January 2004.
2 October 1989		Jesús Emilio Jaramillo Monsalve	ELN guerillas	Arauquita, Colombia	73	Murdered	Roman Catholic priest and staunch opponent of the ELN who was abducted and killed on 2 October 1989. His remains were located the next day next to the Venezuelan border.
2 October 1989		Liang Shan Shan	Oh Laye Koh	Yishun, Singapore	17	Murdered	Liang, a Malaysian schoolgirl studying in Singapore, was abducted by school bus driver Oh Laye Koh, who enticed her into his bus after she left school. She was found murdered at Yishun Industrial Park twelve days after her abduction. Koh was acquitted of the crime, but later convicted on appeal and given the death penalty.
14 October 1989		Sarafia Parker	Kenneth McDuff	(United States) Temple, Texas, U.S.	29	Murdered	The body of 29-year-old Sarafia Parker was discovered on October 14, 1989, in Temple, Texas; she had been beaten, strangled, and dumped in a field. Parker's murder is believed to be one of six committed by serial killer Kenneth McDuff following his parole from a life sentence for three additional murders. Although McDuff was never charged in connection with Parker's death, he was later found guilty of capital murder and executed.
22 October 1989		Jacob Wetterling	Danny Heinrich	(United States) St. Joseph, Minnesota, U.S.	11	Murdered	Wetterling was kidnapped on his way home by a masked gunman. His remains were not found until 2016.
27 October 1989		Amy Mihaljevic	Unknown	(United States) Bay Village, Ohio, U.S.	10	Murdered	The victim was lured by an unidentified assailant through telephone to run an errand for her mother. The girl had been seen meeting the subject at a plaza and was never seen alive again. Her body was found in 1990. The case remains unsolved.
30 October 1989		Lee Iseli	Westley Allan Dodd	(United States) Portland, Oregon, U.S.	4	Murdered	Lee Iseli was abducted, sexually abused and strangled by serial killer Westley Allan Dodd in Portland, Oregon. According to Dodd's own testimony, he resuscitated Iseli after killing him and then asphyxiated him again, but more slowly.
13 November 1989		James Kirk II	Westley Allan Dodd	(United States) Camas, Washington, U.S.	6	Released	The 6-year-old boy was a victim of kidnapping by serial killer Westley Allan Dodd.
3 December 1989		Melissa Brannen	Caleb Hughes	(United States) Lorton, Virginia, U.S.	5	Unknown (presumed dead)	Melissa Brannen was lured away from a Christmas party at the apartment complex where she lived with her mother and was never seen again, alive or dead. The complex's handyman, Caleb Hughes, was jailed for kidnapping Melissa with intent to rape her and is assumed to have killed her, but with no body he could not be charged with murder.
8 December 1989		Rubaiya Sayeed	Kashmiri separatist militants	Srinagar, India	23	Released	Rubaiya Sayeed, the third daughter of Indian Home Minister Mufti Mohammad Sayeed, was abducted by Kashmiri separatist militants at 3:45 p.m. on 8 December 1989. Sayeed, a 23-year-old medical intern, was on her way home from Lal Ded Memorial Women's Hospital via a local mini bus when she was forced out of the vehicle at gunpoint. The kidnapping was carried out in Srinagar by the Jammu Kashmir Liberation Front, which demanded the release of five jailed members of the organization in exchange for Sayeed's release. Sayeed was set free at 7:00 p.m. on 13 December 1989 when these conditions were met. The JKLF admitted to having carried out the kidnapping in 2004, and one of the key leaders of the organization, Yasin Malik, was identified by Sayeed as one of her kidnappers in July 2022.
