= Wardrip =

Wardrip is a surname. Notable people with the surname include:

- Faryion Wardrip (born 1959), American serial killer
- Noah Wardrip-Fruin, American academic
