= Kidnapping of Ursula Herrmann =

1981 crime in Germany

Ursula Herrmann
- Ursula Herrmann, c. 1981
- Born: Ursula Herrmann; 24 November 1970; Bavaria, Germany
- Died: 15 September 1981 (aged 10); Weingarten Forest, Bavaria, Germany
- Cause of death: Suffocation
- Known for: Victim of child abduction and murder

The kidnapping of Ursula Herrmann was a notorious child kidnapping which occurred in Germany on 15 September 1981 in which a 10-year-old girl disappeared while riding a bicycle to her home. The child was subsequently found dead in a rectangular wooden box buried in woodland.

The circumstances surrounding Herrmann's kidnapping, confinement and death led to her being known as the Girl in the Box.

== Disappearance ==
Hermann was making the trip between her cousin's house and her home on Tuesday, 15 September 1981. This was a bicycle ride which typically took the child ten minutes. En route, Herrmann disappeared. Her disappearance triggered an immediate search, but only her bicycle was found.

On 17 September, several cryptic calls were made to her home, consisting only of the distinctive Bayern 3 radio jingle. On 18 September days a ransom note composed from cut-out letters arrived, apparently intended to have been delivered earlier before the phone calls began, demanding DM 2 million, and explaining that the jingle was meant to elicit a yes-or-no response concerning payment of the ransom. On the next call, Ursula's mother affirmed that the ransom would be paid, but received no communication from the kidnappers. Instead, a letter arrived on 21 September, with ransom payment instructions for an unstated location. The ransom sum was raised, but instructions on where to leave the ransom never arrived.

== Discovery and investigation ==
Two weeks after Ursula's disappearance, a grid search was undertaken in the forest where Ursula disappeared by officers with metal rods, probing for disturbances. After four days of searching, police found Ursula Herrmann's dead body in a box buried in the woods.

It was established that Herman had been kidnapped and placed in a prepared hiding place in the Weingarten forest. She was buried in the forest floor in a box measuring 72 cm × 60 cm × 139 cm (2.4 ft × 2.0 ft × 4.6 ft), which had lights, blankets, food, reading material, a radio tuned to Bayern 3 and a toilet bucket. A system of pipes was provided for ventilation, covered with leaves. However, with wet leaves and no forced air movement, it did not provide sufficient exchange of air, so that the girl suffocated between 30 minutes and five hours after she was placed in the box. Autopsy results indicated that she had not struggled or moved during her time in the box, and that she may have been drugged.

The box was too large for one person to have transported to the site, weighing 60 kg, and police assumed that more than one person was involved. Tips led to Werner Mazurek, a 31-year-old television repairman, who was a neighbor of the Herrmann family and known to be in debt. After a day without recalling his whereabouts, Mazurek eventually offered as his alibi that he had been playing Risk with his wife and two friends. Nevertheless, Mazurek was arrested in January 1982 and questioned for several days before being released. In February, Mazurek's acquaintance Klaus Pfaffinger stated during questioning that Mazurek had asked him to dig a hole in the forest, and that he had seen a box in the hole. However, Pfaffinger could not lead police to the burial location and recanted his admission. No further progress was made in the investigation, apart from the discovery of a wire in the forest, apparently used to provide an alert during the kidnapping.

In 2005, DNA analysis was used to examine evidence found in the box, but no useful matches were found. By then, the thirty year statute of limitations for kidnapping with fatal consequences was approaching, and the prime suspects were re-examined. Pfaffinger had died, but Mazurek was placed under surveillance, and in October 2007 his house was searched and Mazurek provided a saliva sample. No match was obtained between evidence and Mazurek.

During the search of Mazurek's house, police confiscated a tape recorder. Police developed a theory that the tape recorder had been used to play the Bayern 3 jingle in the calls to the Herrmanns. Mazurek and his wife were arrested on 28 May 2008 and charged with the crime.

== Trial ==
The trial began in February 2009. Police presented evidence of Mazurek's prior legal difficulties, including a 2004 fraud conviction, and of animal cruelty. It was established that Mazurek had the means to construct the box, that he had listened to police communications during the search, and that he was in debt. Surveillance evidence showed that Mazurek had discussed the statute of limitations with a friend. The Grundig Model TK 248 tape recorder was the subject of an elaborate forensic report. According to the report, the tape recorder had technical abnormalities which were identifiable in the jingle codes that appeared in the recorded phone calls to Herrmann family. Prosecutors also introduced Pfaffinger's abortive confession, with testimony that Pfaffinger had been deliberately misleading, and that he had accurately described the box and its burial site. Evidence was entirely circumstantial, and the tape recorder's distinctive noises when played were emphasized by the prosecution. Mazurek maintained that he had bought it at a flea market the week before the raid, but no corroboration from sellers could be found.

The defense examined Pfaffinger's statement and revealed that Pfaffinger's confession had not been recorded contemporaneously: it had been written down by investigators weeks later, and had never been signed. Ursula's brother Michael took the extraordinary measure of making a written statement to the court, stating that the tape recorder analysis was "incomplete or one-sided."

The Augsburg public prosecutor demanded a sentence of lifelong imprisonment. The criminal court, composed of three judges and two jurors, found Mazurek guilty, and, on 25 March 2010, Mazurek was sentenced to life imprisonment for extortionist human robbery with fatal consequences. His wife was acquitted.

== Civil case ==
Ursula's brother, Michael Herrmann, brought a civil case before the district court of Augsburg against Mazurek in 2013, demanding €20,000 in compensation, because he had suffered sustained damage to his health through the criminal case. Michael had become increasingly convinced that Mazurek had been wrongfully convicted on faulty evidence, and that a court action would be a means of re-examining the case.

The case came to trial in 2016. Despite opposition from judges who were aware of Michael Herrmann's motives in the proceedings, the trial continued for two years. Evidence debunking the tape recorder analysis was introduced, along with forensic analysis of the ransom notes that concluded that the author of the note was an educated native German speaker who was pretending to be a foreigner, and that the writing could not have been produced by Mazurek.

The case was concluded in May 2018, with a verdict that ordered Mazurek to pay Herrmann €7000. In doing so, the court effectively affirmed that Mazurek had kidnapped Ursula Herrmann.

In May 2019, Michael Herrmann presented new evidence to the judicial authorities concerning the ransom note. Herrmann alleged that traces of pressure from mathematical sketches corresponding to class work at the upper secondary level could be discerned in the note.

== Release ==
Mazurek was released in June 2023 after 15 years in prison.

== Media ==
The case was featured on the ZDF television series Aktenzeichen XY… ungelöst in 1982, 1986, 2002 and 2020.

- Gunther Scholz: Ich war es nicht! Zwei Urteile und viele Zweifel. documentary film, 2016 (in German)
- Gunther Scholz, Der Fall Ursula Herrmann (in German)

== See also ==
- Barbara Mackle kidnapping in 1968, possibly a model for the Herrmann crime
- List of kidnappings (1980–1989)
- List of solved missing person cases (1980s)
