= Tadeusz Kwaśniak =

Polish pedophile and serial killer

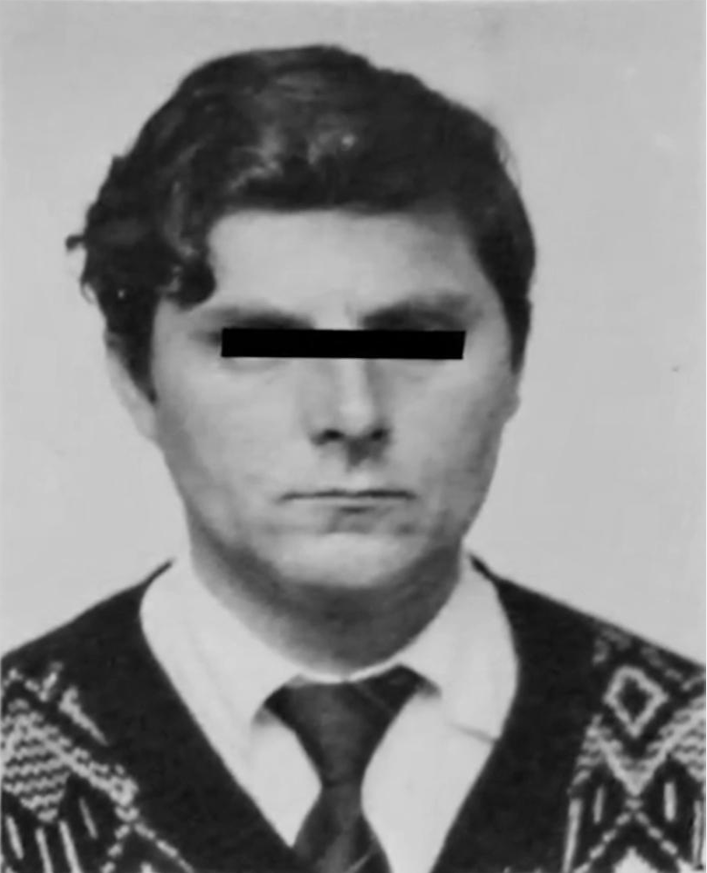
- Born: 24 January 1951; Lądek-Zdrój, Polish People's Republic
- Died: 24 July 1991 (aged 40); Poznań, Poland
- Cause of death: Suicide by hanging
- Other name: The Towel Strangler
- Conviction: Murder
- Penalty: Killed himself before he could be sentenced

Details
- Victims: 5
- Span of crimes: 1990–1991
- Country: Poland
- Date apprehended: 22 April 1991

Tadeusz Kwaśniak (24 January 1951 – 24 July 1991), known as the Towel Strangler (Polish: Ręcznikowy dusiciel), was a Polish paedophile (Note: "He had an easy way of establishing contact with children, an in fact with underage boys, he was an active, extremely violent homosexual with a pedophilic disorder.") and serial killer who raped and murdered five boys across Poland between April 1990 and April 1991.

== Crimes ==
He was first reprimanded for committing lecherous acts with girls, (Note: "Ahead of us was a man aged 40, whom had been imprisoned for twelve years, punished for lecherous acts with girls, then for theft, and each time he was released early for good behavior.") spending a total of 12 years behind bars. After leaving Wronki Prison, Kwaśniak began a series of thefts, rapes and murders of young boys.

The first attempt took place on 20 April 1990, in Bytom on Budryka Street. Under the pretence that he had received an envelope from the 10-year-old victim's father, Kwaśniak managed to enter the child's apartment. There, he began to strangle the boy with a towel, but the boy pretended to be dead. After the perpetrator left the flat, the boy informed his parents about the event.

On 7 May 1990, in Radom, he robbed and murdered a 10-year-old boy. As before, he used a towel to strangle his victim.

On 24 May 1990, in Wrocław, he attempted to rob, rape and murder an 11-year-old boy. He accosted the boy on the street, and under the pretence of picking up an envelope from the victim's apartment, he managed to enter the apartment. There he explained that he was going to take revenge on his father because he got Kwaśniak fired. He raped the boy, and then began strangling him with a towel. The boy fainted but managed to survive. The perpetrator sent a letter to the flat: "Revenge! I waited 14 years!"

On 31 May 1990, he carried out another murder in Szczecin. He strangled a 9-year-old boy with a towel, leaving a card next to the corpse which said: "Revenge, finally - Z."

On 6 June 1990, another boy was murdered in Kutno. Kwaśniak strangled him with a towel, after which he robbed the trap. After that, he wrote 'Revenge' on the bathroom mirror with lipstick.

On 18 June 1990, he robbed and then murdered a 9-year-old boy on Szymanowski Street in Oława. The boy was strangled with a towel; found next to him was a card with the inscription "Finally, I made the expected revenge -B." was left. (Note: After the analysis it was found that the inscription was made with the victim's hand)

On 3 January 1991, he committed a robbery on Topolowa Street in Zbąszyń. He tricked the boy into letting him into the apartment, and then stole money, a revaluation voucher and an insurance card. Thanks to the boy, a description of the perpetrator was established, which matched the descriptions made on the basis of witness testimonies from previous acts: a man aged 30–35, well-built, a height of 175 cm, dark hair and carrying a weapon.

On 26 February 1991, in Rataje, he robbed and murdered a 12-year-old boy. The boy was strangled with a towel. Witnesses who saw the man talking with the boy were quickly located and were able to describe what the perpetrator was wearing. The subsequent investigation to catch the murderer was given the code name Revenge. In February 1991 after sifting through numerous pieces of evidence, all the murders were connected to one man. The police in Poznań collected details from previous murders and commissioned sexologist Lechosław Gapik to develop a psychological portrait of the perpetrator. The issue was publicized by the "997" publivision program, which reconstructed the murders and gave the perpetrator a modus operandi and portrait. Thanks to these actions, it was established that the perpetrator had accosted boys in Rataje for a few days, with whose help a facial composite was made and published by the media, as well as being posted at bus stops and in taxis. For any help in catching the perpetrator, the Provincial Police Chief of Poznań set a reward of 5,000,000 Polish złoty.

Despite this, on 7 March 1991, in Wrocław, Kwaśniak raped another boy. Under the pretext of giving the parents of the boy a letter from his aunt who lived abroad, he managed to enter the apartment.

On 18 April 1991, he attacked once again Sosnowiec, but his victim managed to survive.

== Arrest ==
On 22 April 1991, the police in Poznań received a signal from the headmaster of Primary School No. 6 on the Rusa Housing Estate about students who were being accosted by a suspicious man. Later, the same application was made by a woman who, during a walk around the estate, noticed the same strange man. As a result of this, the man was soon detained on one of the residential streets.

During interrogation, the man, who turned out to be Kwaśniak, admitted to the murders in Oława, Kutno, Szczecin, Radom and Poznań, to the attempted murders in Bytom and Wrocław, and to the rape in Sosnowiec. He also admitted to several dozen apartment thefts, including those in Słupsk, Białystok, Lublin, Kraków, Częstochowa, Bydgoszcz, Szczecin and Wejherowo.

== Death ==
On 24 July 1991, Kwaśniak committed suicide in his prison cell, hanging himself with a bandage. In connection with his death, the investigation was discontinued. He was buried at the Miłostowo cemetery on 1 August 1991.

== See also ==
- Mariusz Trynkiewicz
- List of serial killers by country
