= Murder of Jonelle Matthews =

1984 murder in Greeley, Colorado, US

Jonelle Matthews
- Matthews in 1984
- Born: Jonelle Renee Matthews; February 9, 1972; Santa Barbara, California, U.S.
- Disappeared: December 20, 1984 (aged 12)
- Status: Solved
- Died: c. December 20, 1984; Greeley, Colorado
- Cause of death: Gunshot wound to the head
- Body discovered: Along a rural route southeast of Greeley, Colorado
- Resting place: Linn Grove Cemetery, Greeley, Colorado

Jonelle Renee Matthews was a 12-year-old American girl who disappeared near Greeley, Colorado, on December 20, 1984. Her remains were discovered on July 24, 2019, by construction workers installing a new pipeline 15 miles (24 km) from her home. Steven Pankey was sentenced to life imprisonment on October 31, 2022, after his arrest and trial for Matthews' murder.

== Family ==
Jonelle Matthews was born on February 9, 1972, to 13-year-old Terri Vierra at Cottage Hospital in Santa Barbara, California. She was adopted six weeks later by James "Jim" and Gloria Matthews, who had an older daughter. Several years later, the family moved from California to Greeley, Colorado. Her father would later become principal of Platte Valley Elementary School in Kersey, Colorado.

== Disappearance ==
On the evening of December 20, 1984, Matthews was performing in a Christmas concert at IntraWest Bank of Denver as a member of Greeley's Franklin Middle School Choir. Her father was at her sister's basketball game and her mother was temporarily out of state caring for an ill family member. After getting a ride home with her friend Deanna and Deanna's father Russ Ross, Matthews arrived at her house in Greeley at 8:15 pm. Shortly after 8:30 pm, Matthews answered a phone call and took a message for her father. The phone call was the last time anyone was known to have spoken to her other than her abductor.

Matthews' father arrived home at 9:30 pm and found the garage door open, but no one was in the house. Matthews' shoes and shawl were near a heater in the family room, a place she often sat. Matthews' older sister, Jennifer, arrived home at 10:00 pm, but had not seen her. Their father began to worry and called police. The police arrived at 10:15 pm and found footprints in the snow, indicating that someone had been looking in the windows. There were no signs of a struggle or forced entry. With snow on the ground, Jim Matthews thought it unlikely his daughter would go far without wearing her shoes.

For several weeks after her disappearance, law enforcement placed Matthews' birth mother, Terri Vierra-Martinez, under surveillance without telling her that Matthews was missing. In 1994, a decade after her disappearance, Jonelle Matthews was declared legally dead. In 1997, Gloria Matthews received a letter from Vierra requesting permission to visit. Vierra had used a search consultant to help locate the child she had given up for adoption. The Matthews notified Vierra about what happened; the families later became friends.

Years after Matthews' disappearance, her parents moved to the Philippines as missionaries, later relocating after retirement to Costa Rica. Matthews' sister married and moved out of Colorado.

== Public interest ==
The disappearance attracted interest from the public. One of the first "milk carton kids", Matthews' picture and date of disappearance was printed on the side of milk cartons, which were sold in the United States for a period of time as part of a nationwide effort to find missing children. President Ronald Reagan mentioned Matthews in a speech on March 7, 1985, from Room 450 of the Old Executive Office Building. She was mentioned in the Congressional Record for the United States House of Representatives on April 2, 1985, page 7224. In 2010, the Greeley Tribune published another summary of the case. As of 2018, Greeley Police had been re-contacting witnesses and applying the latest forensic advances in their investigation. She appears in the International Center for Unidentified and Missing Persons' database.

A chokecherry tree was planted in front of Franklin Middle School in memory of Matthews. The tree died after a few years and a plaque inscribed with Matthews' name disappeared.

== Discovery of remains ==
Excavators installing a pipeline discovered human remains at 4:50 pm on Tuesday, July 23, 2019, near the intersection of County Roads 34.5 and 49 at coordinates 40.239848°N 104.602514°W, about 15 mi (24 km) southeast of the Matthews family's former home. Based on DNA evidence, the Weld County Coroner's Office positively identified the remains as being those of Jonelle Matthews. The forensic report listed Jonelle's cause of death as "a gunshot wound to the head".

== Investigation ==
=== Identification of suspect and searches ===
On September 13, 2019, the Greeley Police Department announced that Steven Dana Pankey, a former Greeley resident who ran for governor in Idaho in 2014 and 2018 and for lieutenant governor in 2010, was a person of interest in Matthews' abduction and death.

On Wednesday, September 4, 2019, police in Twin Falls, Idaho, searched Pankey's condo under a warrant that stated investigators had probable cause to believe that Pankey abducted and murdered Matthews. Pankey and his then-wife, Angela Hicks, had lived about 3 miles (5 km) from the Matthews home at the time of Matthews' disappearance and he had been a youth pastor at the church the Matthews family attended. Greeley Police Commander Roy Smith stated that Pankey "had made repeated efforts to speak with detectives" about the Matthews case, but refused to answer questions when detectives traveled to Twin Falls on August 15, 2019.

=== Suspect's statement ===
Pankey knew he was a person of interest in September 2019 when he was interviewed by the Idaho Statesman. Pankey told the newspaper that he did not know Matthews or her family and had only heard about them following the disappearance. He said he and his wife were home on the night of the disappearance. He said they were planning to leave town the next day for a Christmas visit with family members in Big Bear Lake, California, and had already loaded their car. Decades later, Pankey provided investigators with documents concerning this trip, which police said contained "false statements and superfluous details".

=== Suspect's involvement with the case ===
A few months following Matthews' disappearance, Pankey attended a church service where a minister claimed that the girl would be found safe. Hicks claimed to have heard Pankey muttering in response, accusing the minister of being a false prophet. In 2008, Pankey's son was murdered. At his son's funeral, Hicks reportedly heard Pankey say, "I hope God didn't allow this to happen because of Jonelle Matthews."

The police announced that Pankey had long been a person of interest in the case. Pankey repeatedly claimed to have knowledge of the crime and had asked "for immunity in exchange for information". The criminal indictment said that he "intentionally inserted himself in the investigation many times over the years claiming to have knowledge of the crime which grew inconsistent and incriminating over time". Pankey had claimed that on the evening of Matthews' abduction, a rake was used to cover up tracks left in the snow. He also claimed to have watched students walking home from the middle school which Matthews attended. Pankey's ex-wife, Angela Hicks, said they started their trip on December 22, two days after Matthews' disappearance. She also said this trip was unexpected. Hicks said they returned to Greeley on December 26 and that Pankey took an unusual interest in the disappearance. She said that on their return trip, Pankey "uncharacteristically listened to the radio, searching for news of the girl's disappearance". She also said that after their return, Pankey forced her to read to him newspaper articles concerning the case. According to the 2020 indictment statement, shortly following their return to Greeley, Pankey started digging in their yard. At about that time, a car stored on their property caught fire and the burned car "was disposed of at a salvage yard". Pankey gave an interview to the Times-News and said he was being framed by the police because of his sexuality, identifying himself as a "celibate homosexual".

=== Charges and reaction ===
On October 13, 2020, Pankey was indicted on charges of first-degree murder and kidnapping in Matthews' death. He was held without bail at the Ada County Jail in Boise until he was extradited to Colorado. Pankey was 69 years old at the time of his indictment.

Jennifer (Matthews) Mogensen, Matthews' older sister, said her family experienced "some closure" when they learned that her sister was murdered; she further stated that she considers Pankey's arrest "another gift to our family". Mogensen's father, Jim Matthews, was reportedly "especially excited to see justice". Mogensen said that while there had been sibling rivalry between her and her younger sister in 1984, the disappearance and murder eliminated the possibility for the two siblings to grow closer.

== Trial ==
On October 13, 2020, Steven Pankey was indicted on charges of murdering and kidnapping Matthews. Following extradition from Idaho, Pankey made his first appearance in a Colorado courtroom in Greeley on October 30, 2020.

=== First trial ===
Pankey's trial began on October 14, 2021, ultimately ending in a mistrial on November 4, 2021, due to a hung jury. The jury voted to convict Pankey on a single misdemeanor count of making false statements to police, but was unable to come to a unanimous verdict on the kidnapping and murder charges. The prosecution argued that Pankey's behavior and statements incriminated him in the murder, but Pankey's defense attorney argued that his "obsessive interest" in the case could be attributed to Asperger syndrome.

=== Second trial ===
Upon retrial, Pankey was found guilty of the kidnapping and murder of Jonelle Matthews by a Weld County jury on October 31, 2022. He received a sentence of 20 years to life in prison. His earliest possible release date is in 2042, at which point he will be 91 years old. After the verdict, he continued to maintain that he was innocent, and his statements and those of his attorneys indicated that they were considering appealing the conviction.

As of 2025, Pankey is serving his sentence at the Arkansas Valley Correctional Facility in Ordway, Colorado.

== Popular culture ==
Matthews' disappearance and murder has been the subject of four television productions: "Who Killed Jonelle Matthews?" in 2022 on the CBS program 48 Hours, 2023's Murdered at First Sight episode "Missing at Christmas", NBC's 2023 episode of Dateline "Footprints in the Snow" and 2024's The Girl on the Milk Carton, a two-part series produced by the Oxygen network.

== See also ==
- List of kidnappings (1980–1989)
- List of solved missing person cases (1980s)
- List of unsolved murders (1980–1999)
