= Michael Singh =

Trinidadian and Tobagonian-born American serial killer

- Singh shortly after his arrest for the killing of his first wife
- Born: Rupert Sookman; February 25, 1945; Trinidad and Tobago
- Died: March 30, 2005 (aged 60); Fulton Medical Clinic, Fulton, Missouri, U.S.
- Conviction: Manslaughter
- Penalty: 10 years (1977); Not guilty by reason of insanity (1982)

Details
- Victims: 3
- Span of crimes: 1975–1982
- Country: United States
- States: New Mexico, Missouri
- Date apprehended: For the final time on May 26, 1982

Michael Herbert Singh (born Rupert Sookman; February 25, 1945 – March 30, 2005) was a Trinidad and Tobago-born American serial killer who killed a girlfriend and two wives in New Mexico and Missouri from 1975 to 1982. Found not guilty by reason of insanity for the final murder, he was detained at a mental health clinic until 2005, when he was stabbed to death by a fellow inmate.

== Early life ==
Rupert Sookman was born on February 25, 1945, in Trinidad and Tobago, one of seven children born to Indo-Trinidadian and Tobagonian parents. Little is known of his upbringing, but after finishing high school, he worked as an elementary and high school teacher before he and his family moved to Denver, Colorado, to avoid discrimination from the black population in Trinidad and Tobago. Shortly after the move, Sookman enlisted in the United States Army and fought during the Vietnam War, but was honorably discharged and returned to Denver, where he opened a clothing store. He later re-enlisted in the Army, but later left as he had difficulties adjusting and because his business had failed, leaving him without an income. Sookman then moved to Los Angeles, California, and changed his name to Michael Herbert Singh.

== Murders ==
=== Candace Starr ===
Sometime in 1975, Singh began a relationship with 16-year-old Candace Lynn Starr, but it was quickly soured by his violent behavior towards her and she eventually dumped him. Angered by this, he kidnapped her at gunpoint from her home in Los Angeles on September 21, dragging her into his van while Starr's two younger sisters watched. For the next few months, Singh kept his ex-girlfriend as a hostage until they eventually wound up at a convenience store in Gallup, New Mexico on December 14. There, he drew a gun and shot Starr, killing her on the spot.

Immediately afterward, Singh got into his van and fled, but not before some witnesses were able to get a partial view of his face and the color of his van. This information was later relayed to the authorities, but as they were unable to gather more evidence or identify the victim, the case quickly went cold and was left unsolved for decades. Starr remained unidentified until June 2009, when her DNA was submitted to CODIS and subsequently matched her profile on The Doe Network.

=== Mary Singh ===
Following Starr's murder, Singh moved to Springfield, Missouri, where he soon married 29-year-old Mary Ann Spain, a divorcée with two children who worked as an operating room technician at the Cox Medical Center. Like with his previous relationship, Singh quickly became violent towards his newlywed spouse, which led to frequent arguments between the two. During one such argument on September 23, 1976, Singh pulled out a gun and shot Mary in front of her house before fleeing in his car. The murder was noticed by both of her children, with her 5-year-old daughter quickly alerting the neighbors, who in turn informed the police. An autopsy determined that Mrs. Singh had been shot once in the chin at close range, with three additional shots being fired into her chest and left arm.

Singh was arrested later that day along Route 63, not far from Houston. Upon inspecting his car, the officer located a pistol, and during questioning, Singh presented himself as an unemployed construction worker and listed his wife's home as his address. He was then extradited back to Missouri, where he was held on second-degree murder and $75,000 bail. Before his arraignment, Singh petitioned to have his prison diet changed to a vegetarian one, a request that was subsequently granted by the court.

==== Prosecution ====
Initially, Singh's trial was scheduled to start in March 1977, but due to a violent outburst during a hearing which required that the defendant be restrained by seven bailiffs, the presiding judge ordered that the proceedings should be adjourned until Singh could get a second evaluation. The previous day, he had shown signs of increasing agitation, paced around the courtroom and even uttered obscenities under his breath. When psychiatrists at the Fulton State Hospital deemed Singh sane, his trial date was pushed back to August 1.

In July, Singh filed a petition to have Circuit Judge James H. Keet disqualified from the proceedings, citing alleged prejudice against him. In response, Keet staunchly refused, filing a ruling explaining his decision. In response, Singh attempted to have his trial delayed again, claiming that he suffered from a physical ailment that prevented him from fully concentrating during the proceedings, but his request was denied.

During the trial, prosecutors brought Mrs. Singh's two children as the primary witnesses, allowing her daughter to describe what she had seen and heard on the day of her mother's murder. In her testimony, the girl described how Singh and Mary had gotten into a heated argument that eventually resulted in the former shooting the latter and then leaving. A forensic pathologist, A.C. Raborar, was later brought in to give a detailed overview of the gunshot wounds, explaining that the bullet that entered through Mrs. Singh's back traveled upward towards her heart, killing her instantly. When he took the stand, Singh and his attorney claimed that Mary, who was taller and stronger than her husband, was the aggressive and domineering one in their relationship and that she was the one who had attacked him first, resulting in her accidental death. In his testimony, Singh alleged that she was a closeted bisexual who had several girlfriends and claimed that she had attempted to force him into having relationships with men, which he was categorically opposed to. These claims were repudiated by family members and witnesses, including the police officer who arrested Singh, as he testified that shortly after his detention, the defendant had asked whether Missouri carried the death penalty for murder.

Eventually, Singh was found guilty by the jury, but a 12–1 decision convicted him on the lesser charge of manslaughter. After a bid to have a new trial was rejected, he was sentenced to 10 years imprisonment and transferred to a penitentiary in Jefferson City, as his attorney alleged that an unnamed inmate had threatened to kill Singh in prison. In 1980, a circuit court ruled that Singh was eligible to receive half of his wife's $9,500 life insurance policy on the grounds that since the manslaughter charge was not considered intentional murder and thus did not disqualify him.

=== Susan Singh ===
After serving four years in various penitentiaries, Singh was moved to the Missouri Department of Corrections Honor Center in Kansas City, where he was allowed two work release weekend permits per month. During this time, he married 34-year-old Susan Irving, but similarly to his previous relationships, Singh quickly turned violent towards his new spouse. On May 13, 1982, he was charged with assault after Susan filed a complaint alleging that she had been kicked in the face and ribs by her new husband, with his court appearance scheduled for June 3.

Before this could occur, however, Singh fled while on work release and went searching for his wife. On May 25, he abducted her from her home in Kansas City and drove her to a rural area near Camden Point, where he bludgeoned her to death with a blunt instrument. Singh then attempted to bury her body in a shallow grave, but was interrupted by a pair of officers who had received a trespassing complaint. He then attempted to escape, but was swiftly arrested after a short chase. After he was lodged into the county jail, a preliminary hearing date was scheduled for June 11. On July 4, Singh attempted to escape from prison by removing a ventilator screen and climbing inside the ceiling area, but another inmate notified the guards and thwarted his escape attempt.

== Imprisonment and death ==
Singh's murder trial was scheduled for July 16, 1984, despite claims from some psychiatrists that he was "grossly disturbed." At said trial, he was found not guilty by reason of insanity and transferred to the Fulton Medical Clinic for treatment. On March 30, 2005, he was stabbed to death by Rahaman M. Muhammad, a fellow inmate with whom he had had disputes before. When questioned, Muhammad claimed that he desperately wanted to be placed back into police custody and decided that the quickest way to do that was to kill somebody.

Four years after his death, Singh was quickly established as the murderer of Candace Starr after she was finally identified via DNA evidence.

== See also ==
- List of serial killers in the United States
