= Terry Hyatt =

Convicted American serial killer

- Born: Terry Alvin Hyatt; March 28, 1957 (age 69); Asheville, North Carolina, U.S.
- Status: Incarcerated
- Convictions: First degree murder (3 counts); First degree kidnapping (2 counts); Second degree kidnapping First degree rape (2 counts); Armed robbery (3 counts); Larceny of a motor vehicle Larceny and receiving Prison escape
- Penalty: Death

Details
- Victims: 3+
- Span of crimes: 1979–1987
- Country: United States
- State: North Carolina
- Date apprehended: November 19, 1998
- Imprisoned at: Central Prison, Raleigh, North Carolina

Terry Alvin Hyatt (born March 28, 1957) is an American serial killer who killed at least three women in North Carolina from 1979 to 1987. Convicted and sentenced to death for two of them, he was linked to the third via DNA profiling in 2005, pleading guilty and receiving a life term. He is currently housed at Central Prison in Raleigh, awaiting execution.

== Early life ==
Terry Alvin Hyatt was born on March 28, 1957, in Asheville, North Carolina, the second of five children. Raised in what was described as a normal family, Hyatt nevertheless struggled with school due to an apparent learning disability and his inability to connect with others on an emotional level. Despite his unusual behavior, he was regarded as friendly and helpful by family and neighbors alike, who said that he fixed old cars and later resold them. At the same time, he was also known as a small-time criminal who frequently stole items. On November 9, 1975, he was given a 4-year prison sentence after he was convicted of larceny, following an incident in which he stole a woman's purse, breaking the conditions of his parole from a previous conviction. In May 1976, he escaped prison but was recaptured only a day later.

== Murders ==
=== Harriet Simmons ===
On April 15, 1979, 40-year-old Harriet Delaney Simmons, a mother of seven and night manager at a restaurant in Raleigh called "Johnny's Supper Club", left in her blue 1978 Toyota to visit her boyfriend in Nashville, Tennessee. She never arrived, however, prompting her son-in-law, Ronald Dement, to go looking for her. After following the same route she had travelled, he found her car at an I-40 rest stop near Statesville, with most of her belongings, except her car keys and purse, still inside the vehicle. Considering this worrying, as she had promised to contact her children if anything had happened, the local police were mobilized to try and locate her. Despite the involvement of both local authorities and the SBI, no trace of Simmons was found for more than a year.

On March 23, 1980, a man walking through the Pisgah National Forest found what appeared to be the skeletal remains of a body in a wooded section not far from Candler. Preliminary examinations determined that the bones were those of a female, but because of deterioration, sheriffs were unable to establish her age, race or cause of death. The remains were then sent to the office of medical examiner Dr. Larry R. Tate in Chapel Hill, who deduced that the victim had been killed by four stabs to the left side of her chest. Judging by the jewelry and car keys found near the body, it was suggested by this time the remains might indeed be those of Harriet Simmons. Later that same day, the state medical examiner, Dr. Page Hudson, released a statement to the press, claiming that the decedent had been tentatively identified as Simmons. With the recovery of her body, authorities began reinvestigating her case, temporarily considering a possible link to the Old Time Fiddler's Convention in Union Grove Township, which attracted visitors from all over the country, since Simmons had disappeared on the final day of the convention. In 1984, an apparent break came to the case when drifter Henry Lee Lucas falsely admitted to Simmons' murder, as well as nine others he had committed in the Carolinas, but like most of his claims, this was later refuted.

=== Betty McConnell ===
On August 25, 1979, 21-year-old Betty Sue McConnell, a young mother of one child and a Dunkin' Donuts employee working in Asheville, disappeared en route to meet a friend at a bowling alley. After failing to return home on time, her mother and older sister contacted the police, who immediately started searching for her. Three hours later, the mortally-wounded McConnell was found off a bank of the French Broad River near Alexander. She had been stabbed several times in the chest. An ambulance was called to save her life, but she died from her wounds en route to the hospital. Two hours later, her partially submerged automobile was found five miles away from where McConnell had been found.

=== Attempted kidnapping and incarceration ===
On October 19, 1979, Hyatt was driving around Asheville when he spotted 40-year-old Carolyn Brigman, walking home from her job at Krispy Kreme. He pulled his truck beside her and, under the threat of a knife, told her to go inside. After driving aimlessly for some time, during which he robbed her of $44 and constantly threatened to cut her throat, he eventually released Brigman after she convinced him that she did not like the police and would not contact them. Immediately after, Brigman went to the police station and described her abductor and his truck, allowing them to track down and arrest Hyatt. A few months later, he was found guilty and sentenced to a 25-year prison term for armed robbery and kidnapping.

=== Jerri Jones ===
On July 9, 1987, 19-year-old Jerri Ann Jones, a cashier working at a Harris Teeter store in Derita, was reported missing after her boyfriend went to see her at the store. A day later, authorities found her body in a wooded section of Derita. She was naked, and her throat had been slit. Police Capt. Larry Snider said an unknown assailant might have kidnapped her from a parking lot on Graham Street. In response to her murder, Harris Teeter stores offered a $10,000 reward for any information provided to authorities relating to her murder, followed by Crime Stoppers with a $1,000 reward.

A few days later, police in Charlotte announced that Jones' murder might be connected to the recent rape of a 24-year-old woman. In both cases, witnesses reported seeing a white male driving a white pickup truck approach the women, and in the Charlotte rape, the woman said that her assailant drove her to an isolated area of Mount Holly-Huntersville Road, where she was raped. Following this announcement, police were overwhelmed with various tips about both cases. However, despite their efforts, the murder became a cold case and went unconnected to the previous two for several more years. The Cold Case Squad of the Charlotte Police Department, when interviewed regarding the unsolved cases in 1994, expressed their hope that in the future, it would be solved using advancing DNA technology.

== Arrest, first trial and sentence ==
On November 19, 1998, Hyatt was arrested for the murders of Simmons and McConnell and was held in the Buncombe County Jail without bond. The arrest came as a shock to his family, all of whom claimed he was not capable of doing such vicious acts.

His arrest came about because of his alcoholic friend, Jerry Leon Harmon, who stumbled into the sheriff's office, claiming that he was wracked with guilt for doing something terrible. He then told them that he had accompanied Hyatt in ramming Betty McConnell's car off-road on the night of her death, in an apparent attempt to steal money for drugs and drinks, but Hyatt then dragged her off into the woods. When he returned, his clothes were bloodied, and he said he had killed the girl. Later on another friend of Hyatt's, Lester Dean Helms, admitted to participating in Simmons' murder; in his account, the two came across her at the rest stop where her car had broken down, offering her a ride to get car parts. Instead, they drove to the mountains, where each raped her before Hyatt dragged her off into the woods and came back without her, with blood on his hands.

Hyatt confessed to the murders, but later attempted to prevent his confession from being admitted as evidence into court. Justice James U. Downs overruled this, reasoning that after his arrest, the defendant had voluntarily waived his rights and had not requested an attorney.

At the trial, Hyatt's attorneys pointed out that no reliable physical evidence existed against their client, and the prosecution's key witnesses, Harmon and Helms, were less than reliable. While these claims were partially acknowledged by the prosecutors, they also pointed out that Harmon had no reasonable motive to confess, as he would also be implicating himself in a possible death penalty case. On February 1, 2000, Hyatt was found guilty and convicted of both murders. The verdict was later celebrated by the victims' families. Four days later he was handed two death sentences for the murder charges and six consecutive life sentences for the rape, kidnapping and robbery charges.

== Second trial and aftermath ==
On January 15, 2005, Hyatt's DNA, which had been entered into CODIS, was linked to Jones' murder. The match was made via a cigarette butt found next to Jones' body, as well as Hyatt's semen, which was found in her mouth. After making a plea deal with the prosecutors, who agreed not to seek the death penalty, Hyatt pleaded guilty to the murder, and was given another life term to run consecutively with his other sentences.

Following this revelation and renewed coverage of the case stemming from an old episode on Cold Case Files which covered Hyatt's original convictions, it was suggested that he might be responsible for even more murders. So far, Hyatt has not been linked to any further violent crimes.

== See also ==
- List of death row inmates in the United States
- List of serial killers in the United States
