= Roberto José Carmona =

Argentine criminal and serial killer

- Born: 1963 (age 62–63); Buenos Aires Province, Argentina
- Other name: "The Human Hyena"
- Convictions: Murder x4 Aggravated robbery Kidnapping; Rape
- Penalty: Life sentence without parole x3 (Ceppi, Pérez and Bocalón); 16 years (Bolea); 20 years (1982 robbery)

Details
- Victims: 4 (3 convictions)
- Span of crimes: 1986–2022
- Country: Argentina
- States: Córdoba Province, Chaco Province
- Date apprehended: most recently on December 13, 2022
- Imprisoned at: Cruz del Eje Prison, Cruz del Eje

Roberto José Carmona (born 1963), known as The Human Hyena (Spanish: La Hiena Humana), is an Argentine thief, rapist and serial killer. Initially imprisoned for killing a teenage girl in 1986, Carmona proceeded to kill two inmates in separate incidents and culminating with the murder of a taxi driver during an escape attempt in 2022.

Carmona is considered one of the most dangerous murderers in the country's history, and is the second longest serving prisoner after Robledo Puch.

== Biography ==
=== Early life ===
Roberto José Carmona was born in 1963 in Buenos Aires Province, the only son of an unknown father and a woman named Magdalena Bonet. Lacking the financial resources to support her son, Bonet left him at the Villa Elisa home in La Plata, where Carmona claimed he had been abused by other children and authorities who constantly beat him and left him without food. He was then moved to a convent, where he also claimed to have suffered physical abuse.

When he was seven years old, his mother took him in again, but as she was absent for much of the day, Carmona grew resentful of her. In his youth, he began to use drugs such as marijuana and pills, and at the age of ten, he committed his first robbery when he broke into a police car and escaped with a .45 caliber pistol.

During his teen years, Carmona was transferred between several juvenile institutions. As an adult, he was imprisoned on multiple occasions for robbery, passing through the prisons in Olmos, Sierra Chica, San Nicólas, La Plata and Junín. In 1982, he was sentenced to 10 years' imprisonment for aggravated robbery, deprivation of liberty and drug usage, but was released on parole on January 10, 1986.

=== Murders ===
==== Gabriela Ceppi ====
On the night of January 14, 1986, Carmona was driving his Ford Taunus through Villa Carlos Paz when he saw three young people on the side of Route 20. They were 16-year-old Gabriela Ceppi and her friends, Guillermo Elena and Alejandro del Campillo, who were returning home from a dance club and whose car had a flat tire. Carmona stopped and helped them change the tire, but after they were done, he pointed a gun at them and stole their belongings. He then forced Ceppi into his car and drove away. After driving for several kilometers, he stopped alongside a dirt road and raped her.

He continued on his way with the girl to Toledo, where he sexually abused her once more. Once this was done, Carmona forced her out of the car and shot her in the head. He then drove towards Villa María, where he picked up hitchhikers Norberto Ortiz and Sergio Pieroni. After claiming to them that he was an army corporal, he threatened the hitchikers and forced them to assist him in the armed robbery of two fishermen they came across.

After Gabriela's abduction was reported to the police, Carmona was arrested on February 11, 1986, in General Pacheco, just after he had kidnapped a cab driver and a family in order to rob them. He was put on trial and swiftly convicted, receiving a life sentence for murder, multiple counts of aggravated robbery and aggravated kidnapping.

==== Prison attacks and murders ====
Carmona was transferred to the San Martín Prison in Córdoba to serve his sentence. In 1988, he stabbed fellow inmate Martín Castro after, in his words, he did not "lend him his wife for sex". Castro survived, but hours later, while he was sleeping, Carmona threw boiling water on his face, permanently disfiguring him.

In 1994, Carmona stabbed to death Héctor Vicente Bolea, the leader of a group of prisoners who had tried to lynch him after Carmona got into a fight. The exact murder weapon was never found, but he was nonetheless convicted and sentenced to a further 16 years imprisonment.

After this incident, Carmona was transferred to the Chaco Regional Prison, but due to his violent nature, he was transferred again - this time to a maximum security prison in Resistencia. In 1997, he killed another inmate, Demetrio Pérez Araujo, by stabbing him in the chest with the sharpened end of a broomstick. For this and other crimes committed beforehand, he was given a second life sentence without the possibility of parole.

== Imprisonment ==
In 2011, after several psychiatric evaluations, Carmona was diagnosed as a psychopath. In their reports, psychiatrists noted that he was incapable of empathizing with the suffering of others and sought to kill for simple pleasure.

Following his imprisonment for the murder of Gabriela Ceppi, Carmona began receiving love letters from several women and was repeatedly visited by "lovers", one of whom he eventually married in a prison ceremony.

In 2014, he was allowed temporary leave to visit his partner, who lives in Córdoba. The leave allowed him three days out of prison every four months, as his partner suffered from osteoarthritis that prevented her from moving, in addition to having a quadraplegic son in need of medical assistance.

In October 2021, Carmona sewed his mouth shut inside the Penitentiary Complex II in Sáenz Peña, following a refusal by authorities to give him a cellphone to communicate with his relatives.

=== Escape and fourth murder ===
On December 13, 2022, Carmona managed to escape from his partner's house, taking advantage of the fact that the police and neighbors were distracted from watching the semifinal match between Argentina and Croatia for the FIFA World Cup.

A timeline of the events concluded that at 4:15 PM, in the middle of the first half of the match, Carmona told the six prison guards that he needed to go to the bathroom. Once outside the house, he stopped the cab driver Javier Bocalón and stabbed him five times in the neck, four times in the chest and twice in the left leg, killing him on the spot. He then placed the body in the passenger's seat and began driving to an unknown destination. Fifteen minutes later, Carmona lost control of the vehicle and crashed it at the corner of Santa Ana and Félix Paz Street.

After abandoning the crashed car, he walked into a supermarket, assaulted a random couple and stole their vehicle. He then drove for about 11 kilometers, until he decided to abandon the car for unclear reasons. Carmona then went to the Vélez Sársfield Clinic, where he tried to steal another car from a woman and her mother, but when the former resisted, Carmona drew a knife and injured her hands. Finally, at 18:15, he was apprehended after a large-scale manhunt. When pressed for a reason for his escape, Carmona replied: "I don't know, they painted me as the violent one".

He was then placed in the Cruz del Eje Prison. Carmona received a third life sentence for the murder of Javier Bocalón on 17 May 2024.

The six prison guards who were supposed to watch over him were also arrested, and are currently under investigation for complicity.

== See also ==
- List of serial killers by country
- List of prison escapes
