= Hausjärvi Gravel Pit Murders =

Series of murders in Finland

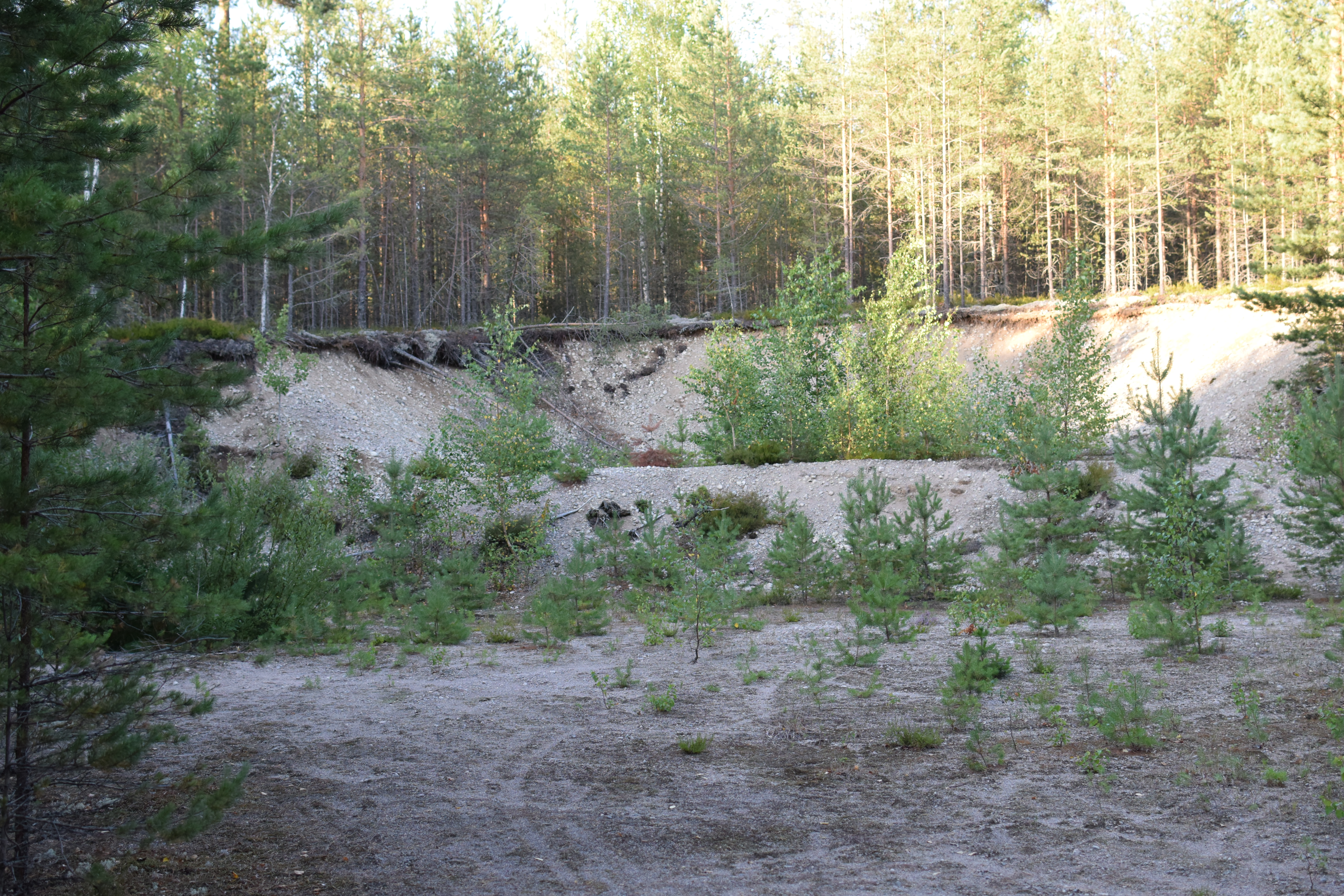
The gravel pit where Helena Meriläinen was attacked

The Hausjärvi Gravel Pit Murders were a series of two or more unsolved violent crimes during the 1990s that were connected to a gravel pit and its surroundings in Hausjärvi municipality, approximately an hour north of Finland's capital Helsinki. According to the Finnish National Bureau of Investigation (NBI), the offences were perpetrated by the same individual, who the Finnish media has given the name Järvenpää Serial Killer.

== The crimes ==
=== Abduction of Helena Meriläinen ===
In November 1990, 39-year-old Helena "Hellu" Meriläinen had spent the evening at her friend's apartment in Järvenpää. Being from nearby Riihimäki, she decided to leave around midnight and walked to the Järvenpää railway station to take a train home. As she was waiting for the train, she was approached by a dark-haired man dressed in a leather jacket. The man asked about her travel plans, and she told him that she was waiting for a train to Riihimäki. The man then offered Meriläinen a ride in his car, and being under the influence of alcohol, she agreed. Meriläinen later described the man's vehicle as a light-coloured passenger car, not a station wagon, probably an older Mazda or Datsun.

At the beginning of the trip, the man offered Meriläinen alcoholic beverages and capsules with an unknown substance in them, both of which Meriläinen consumed. The man himself also consumed several capsules during the ride. While in the car, Meriläinen noted that the man seemed distressed and that the car had a child seat in the back. She fell asleep, and when she woke up, she noticed that the car was not on a lit and paved road to Riihimäki, but on a dark dirt road surrounded by forest. When she asked the man about the route, he assured her that they were still heading towards Riihimäki.

The man drove the car to a dark gravel pit and stopped the car. He tried to persuade Meriläinen to stay in the car for the night, but she refused and said that she wanted to go home. At that point, the man told Meriläinen that he needed to go urinate and exited the car. Meriläinen also felt a need to relieve herself, and when she squatted outside the car, the man struck her on the back of her head with a knife. The woollen cap that Meriläinen was wearing cushioned the knife's impact on her skull, and she managed to get up and flee into the forest, eventually alerting help at a nearby house. While escaping, she heard the man mutter about 'things not having worked out this time' and return to his car.

=== Tuula Lukkarinen ===
At 8:30 am on 17 April 1991, 28-year-old Tuula Anita Lukkarinen left Kellokoski psychiatric hospital, where she was staying as an inpatient, in order to travel to Hyrylä to attend a meeting about her son's custody case. She did not arrive to the appointment, but was sighted by an acquaintance at around 9 am in Järvenpää, in front of a liquor store. Investigators in the case have later verified that Lukkarinen was also sighted in the center of Riihimäki on the evening of that same day.

The following afternoon, on 18 April, a landowner in Hikiä, a village in the Hausjärvi municipality, discovered Tuula Lukkarinen's mutilated body when inspecting damage caused to his forest by the previous night's blizzard. According to police, the time of her death had been around midnight, and she had sustained sadistic violence. It has not been confirmed whether or not she was killed at the location where she was discovered. Despite the blizzard that had hit the area during the hours after her death, the police also recovered her handbag and a possible murder weapon at the scene. Her body had been dragged a few dozen meters to the woods from a small road, located less than 100 meters from the gravel pit where Helena Meriläinen had been attacked five months earlier.

=== Maarit Haantie ===
40-year-old Maarit Haantie disappeared in August 1993 and is suspected of being the victim of a possible serial killer. Her body was searched for by the local authorities to no avail. This disappearance led the NBI to begin investigating the cases of the three women as the doing of one man.

==== Disappearance ====
Haantie was attending a party at the restaurant Zapata in Järvenpää on August 13, 1993. She went there with her partner and a few friends. All of them got in the restaurant except Haantie, who was not let in by the doorman due to her drunkenness. She was last seen standing outside the building and hasn't been seen since.

==== Investigation ====
The disappearance of Haantie was initially filed to the Riihimäki Police, who treated the case as a normal disappearance without any indication of homicide. Soon, however, it was discovered that a bag belonging to Haantie had been found in a restaurant called Martina in the town of Hyvinkää. During interviews with the staff, it was apparent that the employees had removed a drunk person who resembled Maarit Haantie.

The chain of events mentioned above had drawn the attention of the NBI, and soon, the case of Haantie was included in the investigation alongside the 1990 and 1991 events due to commonalities among them. A large search carried out in the woods around the Hausjärvi municipality focused on the gravel pits area south of Hikiä village, but nothing was found. The investigation, however, remains active to this day. In 2007, the television series "Kadonneet", "Disappeared" did an episode on Haantie's case, which attracted a lot of attention. In the section, the NBI specifically asked for a hint about a dark-haired man in Järvenpää in the early 90s who offered rides to women, as described by Helena Meriläinen.

The events surrounding Helena Meriläinen, Tuula Lukkarinen and Maarit Haantie all shared similar locations, the use of alcohol, and a dark-haired driver, leading the NBI to believe that the same perpetrator is responsible for all three cases. According to the NBI, there is additional information that connects the disappearance to the two earlier cases that they won't publish due to an open investigation.

The Kadonneet episode gathered about 30 new tips, which helped with the offender's profiling. According to the NBI, the hints have been very important for the investigation and have confirmed the results of earlier profiling. The investigation is still active, and the Bureau strongly believes that there have been other murder attempts.

The NBI has searched for Haantie from the forest areas in Hausjärvi as late as 2017, claiming that they have information that connects her disappearance to the area.

=== Fourth case ===
In 2017, it was published in the media that there had been a possible fourth case involving the murders. In 1989, a drunken 30-year-old woman had just exited a restaurant in Järvenpää when a man offered her a ride, offering her alcohol and pills and then driving her to a forest area. The case resembles the case of Helena Meriläinen's. Although the woman survived the encounter, the victim's mother brought it up after the woman had died of natural causes years later.

=== Similar unsolved cases in the area ===
In 1988, there were several cases of a man with a similar description driving a white Volkswagen Passat hatchback harassing women in the areas close by, even forcing a 19-year-old woman in Hämeenlinna into his car by threatening her with a pistol. The woman was able to escape from the moving car.

In December 1987, a 19-year-old woman, Heidi Härö, went missing in Mäntsälä after leaving a local bar and probably hitching a ride. Her decomposed body was found five months later in a forest area in Pukkila with some of her clothes missing.

== Offender's profile ==
Over the years, the perpetrator has been profiled largely based on Meriläinen's story and events, with the description as follows:

- At the time of the 1990 abduction, the man was between 30 and 40 years old with dark, curly hair.
- He is about 1.70 m (or 5 ft 7 in) tall.
- He knows the anatomy of a human or a large animal (according to the Lukkarinen murder).
- He possibly had an infant child at the time, as the car's back seat had a child restraint.
- The car itself is thought to be a Sedan Mazda or Datsun.
- He was familiar with the towns of Järvenpää, Hyvinkää and Riihimäki, as well as the forest area around the Hikiä village.
- It is believed that he is unable to form a normal relationship with a woman.
- The man had spoken about his child and indicated that he had a bad relationship with his wife, possibly being divorced.

A lot of new tips about the killer have been provided due to the Kadonneet episode. According to some, a dark-haired man is believed to have offered rides to a few women still in the 21st century. According to the tips, a man fitting the description had last offered a ride to a woman in 2006. The NBI is still investigating the case, believing that the killer can be found. They have also taken into account that the killer may be living abroad or dead.

== See also ==
- List of fugitives from justice who disappeared
- List of unsolved murders (1980–1999)

== See also ==
- Ylen Elävä Archive: Disappeared: Maarit Haantie
