= Mariusz Trynkiewicz =

Polish serial killer (1962–2025)

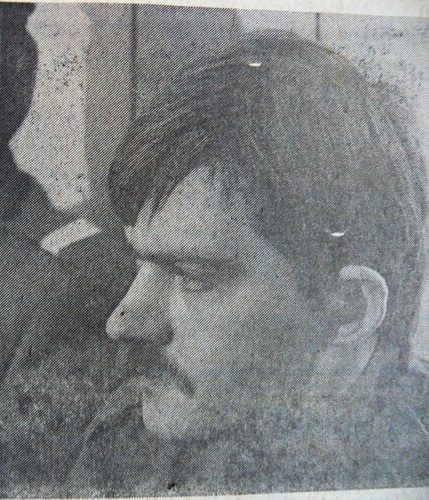
- Born: 10 April 1962; Piotrków Trybunalski, Poland
- Died: 9 January 2025 (aged 62); Gdańsk Detention Center, Gdańsk, Poland
- Other name: The Satan from Piotrkow
- Convictions: Murder (4 counts); Possession of child pornography (2 counts)
- Penalty: Death; commuted to 25 years imprisonment

Details
- Victims: 4
- Country: Poland

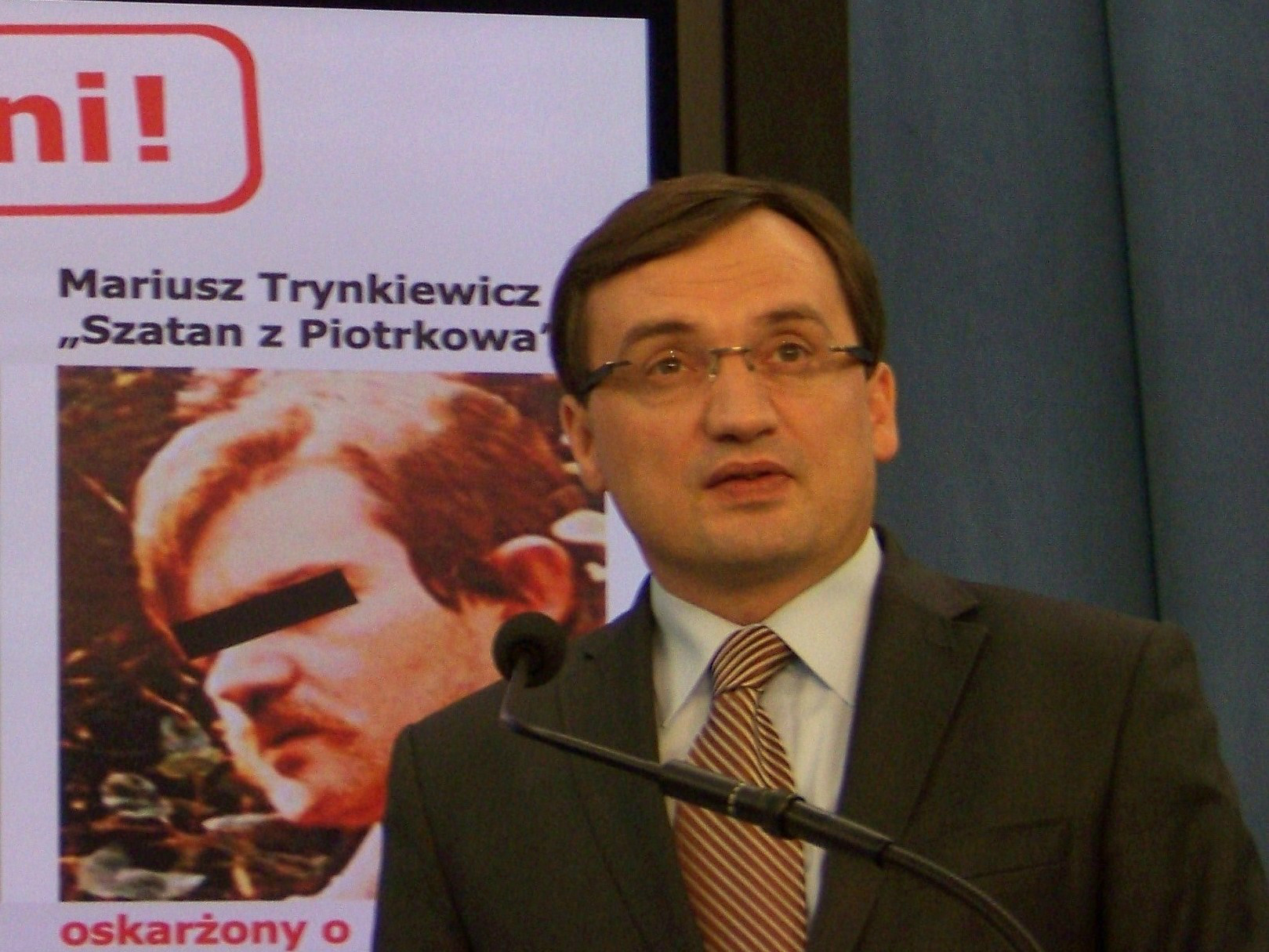
A press conference of Zbigniew Ziobro, with an image of Mariusz Trynkiewicz in the background

Mariusz Wacław Trynkiewicz (10 April 1962 – 9 January 2025) was a Polish serial killer and sex offender, also known as the Satan from Piotrków (Polish: Szatan z Piotrkowa). In the late 1980s, he worked as a physical education teacher. In July 1988, he was sentenced to death for the murder of four boys, which was later commuted to 25 years in prison.

During his military service, he kidnapped and raped a schoolboy, a military court sentenced him to one year of imprisonment with a two-year delay. A few weeks after this sentence, Trynkiewicz lured another boy into his home and molested him, and was sentenced to 1.5 years imprisonment, later the term was increased to 2.5 years.

On 4 July 1988, after his release from prison in connection with the care of his sick mother, Trynkiewicz lured 13-year-old Wojciech Pryczek into his apartment, strangled him, and then buried his corpse in the forest.

On 29 July 1988, Trynkiewicz lured 11-year-old Tomasz Łojek to his apartment and murdered him. He did the same to 12-year-old Artur Krawczyński and Krzysztof Kaczmarek. A few days later, he carried their bodies into the woods and set them on fire. Their bodies were later discovered by a mushroom forager.

During his trial, Trynkiewicz was found to be sane, and his behaviour was marked by the realization of sadism and sexual attraction combined with algolagnia. On 29 September 1989, Trynkiewicz was sentenced to four death sentences for each murder. In the same year, after amnesty, the term was changed to 25 years imprisonment. On 11 February 2014, he was released. On 3 March 2014, a court decided to isolate him at an asylum in Gostynin (Krajowy Ośrodek Zapobiegania Zachowaniom Dyssocjalnym).

In 2015, he was sentenced to a new term of five years and six months for possessing child pornography.

On 6 April 2021, the Gostynin District Court sentenced Mariusz Trynkiewicz to six years of imprisonment for repeated possession of child pornography. He died in the prison hospital of the Gdańsk Detention Center on 9 January 2025, at the age of 62.

== See also ==
- List of serial killers by country
- Tadeusz Kwaśniak
