= Bartolomeo Gagliano =

Italian serial killer

- Born: 1958; Nicosia, Sicily, Italy
- Died: January 22, 2015 (aged 56–57); Sanremo Prison, Sanremo, Liguria, Italy
- Cause of death: Suicide by hanging
- Other name: "The Valentine's Day Monster"
- Convictions: N/A (murders); Robbery; Assault; Kidnapping; Weapons possession
- Penalty: Fedi: Ten years of involuntary commitment Montelupo murders: Involuntary commitment 2000s: 6 years imprisonment and 10 months

Details
- Victims: 3
- Span of crimes: 1981–1989
- Country: Italy
- State: Liguria
- Date apprehended: December 2013

Bartolomeo Gagliano (1958 – January 22, 2015), known as The Valentine's Day Monster (Italian: Il mostro di San Valentino), was an Italian serial killer who murdered two transvestite prostitutes after escaping from prison, where he was serving time for a murder conviction.

Initially confined to a psychiatric hospital, Gagliano escaped and committed further crimes, and shortly after his final capture, he committed suicide in the detention center he was housed in.

== Early life ==
Gagliano was born in Nicosia, Sicily in 1958, as one of Antonio Gagliano and Giuseppina Di Grazia's two sons. A few years after his birth, the family moved to Savona, Liguria, where he was raised in a humble but stable family. As time went on, however, Gagliano began to exhibit behavior that suggested that he had some sort of mental illness.

== Crimes ==
=== First murder and imprisonment ===
On the night of 16 January 1981, the 22-year-old Gagliano was approaching the date of his wedding, but was instead threatened by 32-year-old Paolina Fedi, a prostitute addicted to heroin, who said that she intended to reveal to his fiancée that he had cheated on her. In order to prevent her from doing so, Gagliano killed her inside his Fiat 124 by smashing in her head with a stone along the Autostrada A10 near a toll booth in Celle Ligure. He then abandoned the car and traveled on foot to Savona, where he immediately turned himself in to the carabinieri. Gagliano was deemed incompetent to stand trial and was soon after interned at a psychiatric hospital in Aversa for ten years.

=== First escape and acquaintance with Francesco Sedda ===
On 12 June 1983, a family vacationing in Massa-Carrara had their car blocked by Gagliano, who had been released on furlough. He forced them to drive him to Savona, where he disembarked, disarmed a traffic policeman and kidnapped a schoolgirl at gunpoint. Gagliano then barricaded himself in a store, but eventually surrendered to police after several hours. This time, he was interned at a psychiatric hospital in Villa Medicea L'Ambrogiana, in Montelupo Fiorentino.

While interned there, Gagliano befriended another inmate, Francesco Sedda, a native of Nuoro who was raised in Genoa. Sedda was an HIV-positive drug addict incarcerated for robberies, and like Gagliano, was violent towards prostitutes.

=== Escape from Montelupo and crime spree ===
On 11 January 1989, Gagliano and Sedda exacted a plan to escape from the facility, climbing over the boundary wall, stealing a car and fleeing to Liguria. On 8 February, the two killed 32-year-old Nahir Fernandez Rodriguez, an Uruguayan transvestite living in Milan, by shooting him with a 7.65 caliber pistol at point-blank range. Fernandez's body was later found in a thicket at the Cantalupa service area along Autostrada A7.

Six days later, in Genoa, Gagliano and Sedda came across Francesco "Vanessa" Panizzi, another transvestite prostitute who was having sex with a 34-year-old client in the man's car. Gagliano pulled out his pistol and shot Panizzi in the face, while the client received minor injuries.

On the following day, the pair attacked another prostitute, "Laura", who survived her injuries. A witness would later give a description of the killer and an identikit would be made, which would lead to the arrest of an innocent man who was released on the same day. On 16 February, the editorial staff of Il Secolo XIX received an anonymous phone call from a man, possibly Sedda, who claimed to have contracted AIDS from one of the murdered prostitutes and wanted to five others he had sex with.

== Capture ==
Four days later, a mobile squad stopped an Opel Corsa in downtown Genoa, with the driver and passenger being Sedda and Gagliano, respectively. Sedda managed to flee into a nearby alleyway, but Gagliano - who was carrying a Walther P38 and had 7.65 mm caliber shell casings - was immediately arrested and reinterned at the hospital. A few days later, Sedda turned himself in and was also sent to a psychiatric hospital. Coincidentally, both men ended up at the same facility in Reggio Emilia, but were in separate areas.

=== Aftermath, final escape and death ===
Sometime after his incarceration, Sedda managed to escape on his own and fled to Genoa, where he was caught after committing another robbery. He was returned to Genoa and died of AIDS in 1994, aged 36. In the meantime, Gagliano attempted to unsuccessfully escape on at least two occasions - once between December 1990 and January 1991, and another in June 1994. In the late 1990s and early 2000s, his mental condition improved and he was placed in regular prison facilities.

In 2006, Gagliano was convicted of robbery, assault and weapons possession, upon which he was transferred to Marassi Prison in Genoa, but continued committing robberies when released on furlough. His nephew Andrea also ended up in prison for unrelated convictions, and shared a prison cell with his uncle from June 2011 to September 2013.

On 18 December 2013, Gagliano used another furlough to escape from prison and carjack a businessman's Fiat Panda, which he used to cross the border into France. Panic spread among the population due to his dangerousness, and Gagliano was charged with escape, kidnapping, carjacking, and aggravated use of a weapon. A few days later, Gagliano was captured by French police in Menton and extradited back to Genoa, where he was convicted of all counts and sentenced to six years and ten months imprisonment at the Sanremo Prison.

On the morning of 22 January 2015, a week after he was handed his sentence, Gagliano hanged himself in his jail cell by tying a sheet to the window grates. He was 56 years old.

== See also ==
- List of serial killers by country

== Books ==
- Adolfo Ferraro, Dispersed Materials. Stories from the Criminal Asylum (Italian: Materiali dispersi. Storie dal manicomio criminale), Tullio Pironti, Naples, 2010
