= Shannon Street massacre =

1983 shootout between police and religious leaders in Memphis, Tennessee, U.S.

- Date: January 11–13, 1983
- Location: 2239 Shannon Ave, Memphis, Tennessee, U.S. 35°10′50″N 89°58′56″W

Parties
Memphis Police Department	"Black Jesus" cult

Lead figures
Director John Holt	Lindbergh Sanders †

Number
Hundreds of police officers, at least 6 SWAT officers	7 armed cult members

Casualties and losses
1 killed, 2 injured	7 killed

The Shannon Street massacre was a shootout and standoff between law enforcement and religious leaders at a house on Shannon Avenue in Memphis, Tennessee, United States from January 11 to January 13, 1983. Memphis Police Department (MPD) officers Ray Schwill and Bobby Hester were called to the house after which a confrontation ensued and Hester was taken hostage by men inside the house. After a 30 hour standoff, an MPD SWAT team stormed the house and opened fire, killing all seven captors, after which Hester was found beaten to death. The MPD's handling of the incident was controversial and led to changes in the department's procedure.

== Incident ==
On January 11, 1983, MPD units were called to a house at 2239 Shannon Avenue to investigate an alleged purse snatching. Inside the home was Lindberg Sanders—an African-American man who called himself "Black Jesus"—and thirteen other men who were his followers, along with one man, who tagged along with one of the followers. Sanders harbored a strong hatred for law enforcement and had told his followers that the world would end on January 10, 1983.

Officers Ray Schwill and Bobby Hester responded to the call. Seven people fled the house at this point, but were later captured. Upon arrival, Schwill and Hester were ambushed by the remaining seven men in the house. Schwill sustained a gunshot wound to the face and escaped, but Hester was taken hostage. Schwill radioed for help and police quickly surrounded the house.

The first backup officer to arrive, Officer Tommy Turner, attempted to enter the house but immediately came under fire and was wounded in the head. A second officer, William Russell "Russ" Aiken, entered the house and exchanged gunfire with the rebels. After firing twelve shots from his service revolver, Aiken retreated from the building, retrieved a shotgun from his cruiser, and continued firing into the house as more backup units arrived.

Police began negotiations with Sanders, who stated that he wanted to broadcast the murder of a police officer over a Memphis radio station and that any attempt by officers to enter the house would result in Hester being beaten to death. Hester could be heard on the police radio begging for help. After 30 hours of negotiations with no resolution, an MPD SWAT team raided the house. During the 20-minute raid, the SWAT team fired tear gas into the house and made a dynamic entry. The rebels opened fire on the SWAT team with the two .38 Special service revolvers they had taken from Schwill and Hester; the SWAT team returned fire with shotguns and M16 rifles, killing all seven remaining members, including Sanders. Police then discovered the body of Hester, who had been beaten and stabbed to death several hours earlier.

=== Deaths ===
Name	Age
Lindberg Sanders	49
Larnell Sanders	26
Michael Delane Coleman	18
Earl Thomas	20
Andrew Houston	18
David Lee Jordan	29
Cassell Harris	21
Officer Robert S. Hester	34

== Aftermath ==
Many police officers and citizens were angered by the Memphis Police Department choosing to wait 30 hours before moving on the house. The SWAT team at the scene wanted to raid the house once they heard Hester screaming, but police administrators wanted to keep negotiating. By the time the raid was authorized, Hester had been dead for several hours.

Members of Sanders' family and Memphis' African-American community disputed the MPD's version of events. Sanders' daughter Lucinda claimed that Officer Schwill had started the confrontation at the house by shoving Lindberg Sanders. Schwill was known to mimic African-American speech when interacting with African-Americans, which could have been taken as an insult. Sanders' wife Dorothy alleged that all the men were executed in retaliation for the killing of Hester. Julian Bolton, a Shelby County Commissioner at the time, criticized the police response as excessive, as he felt that not everyone in the house was responsible for Hester's death. Bolton also noted that six of the seven captors were shot in the head and that their bodies were photographed lying next to each other, which he claimed indicated they were executed. An FBI investigation found no wrongdoing on the part of the MPD.

After the incident, the MPD adopted a policy of immediate raids for hostage situations if a hostage has been injured. The MPD also implemented more training on how to de-escalate crisis situations, particularly with mentally ill subjects.

== See also ==
- 1985 MOVE bombing
