= Faryion Wardrip =

American serial killer and rapist on death row

- c. February 1999 mugshot
- Born: Faryion Edward Wardrip; March 6, 1959 (age 67); Salem, Indiana, U.S.
- Spouse: Johnna Jackson (m. 1983; div. 1986) Glenda Kelley (m. 1998)
- Children: 2
- Status: On death row
- Convictions: Capital murder (3 counts); Murder (2 counts)
- Penalty: 35 years in prison (1986; paroled after 11 years); Death (1999)

Details
- Victims: 5
- Span of crimes: 1984–1986
- Country: United States
- State: Texas
- Weapon: Knife
- Date apprehended: May 9, 1986 (murder of T. Kimbrew); Feb. 14, 1999 (murders of T. Simms, T. Gibbs, E. Blau and D. Taylor)
- Imprisoned at: Texas Department of Criminal Justice - Polunsky Unit, Livingston, Texas

Faryion Edward Wardrip (born March 6, 1959) is an American serial killer who sexually assaulted and murdered five women. Four of the women were killed in Wichita Falls, Texas, and the surrounding counties, and one woman was murdered in Fort Worth. Wardrip's killing spree began at the end of 1984 and lasted until the middle of 1986. All of his victims were white, were between the ages of 20 and 25, weighed less than 120 pounds (54 kg), and were under 5 1/2 feet (170 cm) tall.

With the murders occurring across multiple jurisdictions, officials from three law enforcement agencies – the Wichita Falls Police Department, the Wichita County Sheriff's Department and the Archer County Sheriff's Department – initially led isolated murder investigations. These investigations were for three of the murders that occurred within a 5-mile (8.0 km) radius of each other. This separation led to multiple news agencies reporting that the isolated investigations delayed Wardrip's capture.

Within 72 hours of the May 6, 1986 murder of Tina Kimbrew, Wardrip called authorities and confessed to her murder. He was convicted and sentenced to 35 years in prison. After serving less than one-third of his sentence, Wardrip was released on parole in December 1997. He was required to wear an ankle monitor allowing authorities to constantly track his location; he was restricted to movements for work, home and church.

In 1999, the Wichita County District Attorney's Office reopened the murder cases of the victims that occurred in their jurisdiction. DNA evidence found at the scene of two murders were linked to the same killer. Because Wardrip's murder of Kimbrew occurred in 1986, the lead detective became suspicious that he may have been behind the unsolved murder cases. As Wardrip was out on parole and there was no national database of DNA profiles for violent offenders at that time, authorities immediately launched surveillance of Wardrip and managed to secure a sample of his DNA, which was linked to two victims. He later confessed to the murders of the third and fourth victims. In 1999, at 40 years old, Wardrip was sentenced to death by lethal injection for the first murder, and three life terms for the other three killings.

== Background ==
Faryion Edward Wardrip was born on March 6, 1959, in Salem, Indiana, to George and Diana Wardrip. He was his parents' first born child and has two brothers. There are no news articles or television reports of Wardrip experiencing any type of mental or physical abuse during his childhood. He dropped out of high school in the twelfth grade. In 1978, at the age of 19, Wardrip joined the United States National Guard. After 6 years of service, Wardrip was released from the National Guard under a less-than-honorable discharge. The discharge was due to smoking marijuana, disorderly conduct and multiple absences without leave (AWOL). During his military service he was not deployed into combat duty.

In March 1983, at 24 years old, he married his first wife, 20-year-old Johnna D. Jackson. The couple had two children together. The marriage was tarnished by Wardrip's drug and alcohol abuse. This same year, he worked as a janitor at the Wichita Falls General Hospital and within twelve months he was promoted from janitor to orderly.

Due to his addictions, he was unable to maintain employment and was bouncing between jobs. Johnna's parents helped the couple financially by paying their rent and buying their groceries. Tired of her husband's lack of responsibility and addictions in December 1985, Johnna separated from Wardrip, taking the children with her. She soon filed for divorce, which was granted in October 1986.

== Murders ==
=== Terry Sims ===
Terry Sims, aged 20

Terry Lee Sims, 20, worked as a part-time EKG specialist at Bethania Hospital in Wichita Falls, Texas, while attending nearby Midwestern State University. Sims and co-worker Leza Boone had finished working their evening shifts at the hospital at approximately 11:00 pm on December 20, 1984. Then leaving work, Sims rode with Boone to a mutual friend's house to exchange Christmas gifts. Sims was planning on spending the night at Boone's residence on Bell Street so Boone could help Sims study for her final exam the following day. Unexpectedly, Boone received a call to return to the hospital to work the midnight shift. She drove Sims to her residence, and gave Sims the key to her apartment, dropping her off at approximately 12:30 am on December 21, 1984.

At 7:30 a.m. that same morning Leza Boone returned home after working a double shift at the hospital. After repeatedly knocking on her locked front door, and receiving no answer, Boone went to the landlord and was given a key to her residence. When she gained entry she saw that the living room had been ransacked. Boone immediately ran back to her landlord's residence asking for help to find her friend Terry. The landlord entered the apartment, and found Sims lying deceased on the bathroom floor, in a pool of blood. She had been sexually assaulted and stabbed to death.

Apparently, while Boone was away at work, Sims had heard Faryion Wardrip causing a disturbance, and she went outside to investigate. Wardrip lunged at Sims, and she ran back into the apartment and locked the door. Wardrip had targeted Sims "for no apparent reason" and broke the door down, after she locked him out. Wardrip, standing at 6 ft 6 in (198 cm) and weighing 220 pounds (100 kg), grabbed the 5 ft 3 in (160 cm), 94-pound (43 kg) Sims and assaulted her. Because of her resistance, Wardrip bound the victim's hands with an electrical cord. Sims was estimated to have lived several minutes after the attack was over. Police officers investigating preserved a semen sample, and a fingerprint, found on Sims' shoe for future analysis. Over a decade later, the print and semen were positively identified to be those of Wardrip.

Terry Sims was buried at Crestview Memorial Park in Wichita Falls, Texas.

=== Toni Gibbs ===
Toni Gibbs, aged 23

Toni Jean Gibbs, 23, disappeared on January 19, 1985, while employed at Wichita General Hospital. Gibbs was no more than 5 ft 1 in (155 cm) tall and weighed 94 pounds (43 kg). Wardrip came across Gibbs at about six o'clock in the morning, after he had been out walking all night. He knew Gibbs because she was a registered nurse (RN) at the same hospital where he worked as an orderly. Gibbs offered Wardrip a ride and after he got in her car, he began hurling her around and screaming at her. He then forced Gibbs to drive down an isolated dirt road to a field.

Two days after her abduction, Gibbs' car was found within a few miles of the hospital. On February 15, utility workers found her naked body in a field at the southwest corner of West Jentsch Road and Highway 281 in Archer County, 1 mile (1.6 km) south of the Wichita county line, one day after what would have been Gibbs' 24th birthday. Gibbs had been sexually assaulted and stabbed. Toni Gibbs had a total of eight stab wounds: three on her back, three on her chest, and two defensive wounds on her left forearm and thumb.

Near her body, police found an abandoned school bus, where her murderer likely conducted the attack. Authorities discovered Gibbs' clothing inside the bus. Gibbs had initially survived the assault and, stripped of her clothing, she had managed to crawl 100 feet (30 m) before she died. After the killing Wardrip then abandoned her vehicle, after legally parking it at the intersection of Van Buren and McGregor Streets in Wichita Falls, less than a mile from his residence. Four days after Gibbs' body was discovered, Wardrip quit his job at the Wichita General Hospital.

Danny Wayne Laughlin, 24, was initially suspected of Gibbs' murder because he often rode his motorcycle near the area where she was killed and because he had met her at a nightclub days before she was killed. He also failed a lie detector test and made suspicious statements. Laughlin was then tried, even though a comparison of Laughlin's DNA with DNA from the semen at the murder scene was unsuccessful and only circumstantial evidence was available. After two days of deliberation, the jury was deadlocked, which resulted in his release from custody. Since only one of the twelve jurors believed Laughlin was guilty, prosecutors decided not to retry Laughlin.

Gibbs was buried at the Clayton Cemetery in New Mexico.

=== Debra Taylor ===
Debra Taylor, aged 25

Two months after he murdered Toni Gibbs, Wardrip traveled to Fort Worth, Texas, with the intention of looking for a job. In Fort Worth, he met 25-year-old Debra Sue Taylor (née Huie), in the early morning hours of March 24, 1985 while at a bar on East Lancaster Street. Debra Taylor had been at the bar with her husband Ken Taylor, but Ken left early because he was tired. Debra remained at the bar. Wardrip approached Taylor and asked her to dance. She accepted his request, and the two spent time together in the club.

Wardrip then asked to drive Taylor home, which she agreed to. While outside, Wardrip attempted to make sexual advances, which were rejected by Taylor. This rejection infuriated Wardrip, and he killed Taylor, leaving her body at a construction site in east Fort Worth. When Debra failed to return home by the next morning, she was reported missing by her husband. Her body was found by two construction workers on March 29, 1985. Taylor's murder was not thought to be related to the other four cases until Wardrip confessed during questioning after his 1999 arrest.

Prior to Wardrip's confession, Taylor's husband was believed to be the culprit. He had passed three polygraph tests but was still considered a suspect by police. Suspicions about Taylor had "destroyed his life" as members of his own and his wife's family "turned against him."

Taylor was buried at Shannon Rose Hill Memorial Park in Fort Worth; her date of death is listed as March 24, 1985.

=== Ellen Blau ===
Ellen Blau, aged 21

On September 20, 1985, Wardrip abducted 21-year-old Ellen Blau in Wichita Falls, Texas. The abduction occurred as Blau was walking alone to her vehicle, after leaving her evening job as a waitress. She was also a student at Midwestern State University in Wichita Falls. Once abducted, Wardrip forced Blau to drive to a secluded area where he eventually killed her by strangulation. He stated in a Cold Case Files episode that he had broken her neck. Leaving her body in the secluded area, Wardrip drove Blau's car back into Wichita Falls and abandoned it along with her purse. Her blood was also discovered on the inside of the vehicle. A county road crew employee found Blau's body in a field in Wichita County on October 10, 1985.

When her body was found, it was in a very advanced state of decomposition, to the point where she could only be identified by comparing dental records. She may have been sexually assaulted, as her underwear had been pulled down, but the condition of her remains prevented accurate analysis. No semen samples were available. One of her friends had lived in the same apartment complex as Wardrip and had stated that she felt uncomfortable around him.

Blau was buried at B'nai Jacob Memorial Park in New Haven, Connecticut; her date of death is listed as September 20, 1985.

=== Tina Kimbrew ===
Tina Kimbrew, aged 21

On May 6, 1986, Wardrip killed 21-year-old Tina Elizabeth Kimbrew, a waitress he had recently befriended. He went to her apartment and suffocated her with a pillow because she "reminded him of his ex-wife". Prior to the discovery of her body, neighbors told police that they had seen a white man, 6 ft 2 in (188 cm) tall, with dark brown hair and wearing a baseball cap leave the complex. Danny Laughlin, who had been suspected in the death of Toni Gibbs, was ruled out as a suspect because he did not fit this description.

A few days later, on May 9, Wardrip called the police from across the state in Galveston, threatening to commit suicide. Once the police arrived he confessed to the murder. He was sentenced to 35 years in prison. He was paroled on December 11, 1997, and he moved to Olney, Texas, where he became an active supporter of the local church, gaining a good reputation. On October 15, 1998, he married Glenda Diane Kelley. He eventually got a job at a screen door factory.

Kimbrew was buried at Wilbarger Memorial Park in Vernon.

== 1999 convictions and aftermath ==
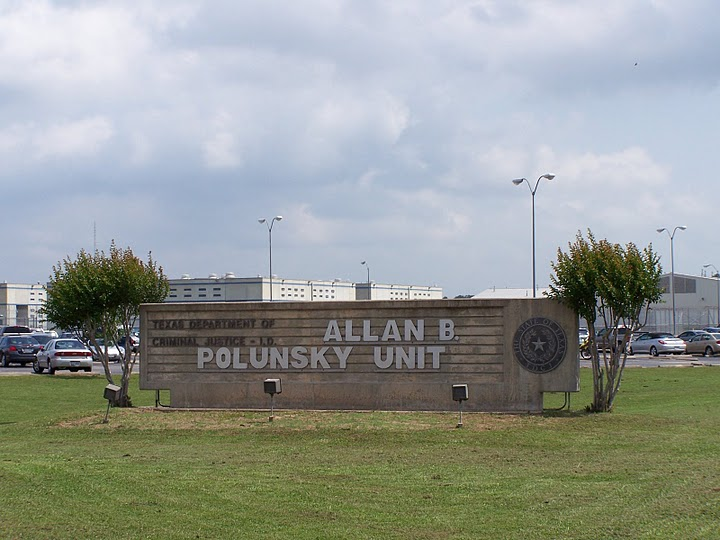
Polunsky Unit, where Wardrip is held

In January 1999, Wichita Falls detective John Little began a cold case investigation of the unsolved murders of Terry Sims, Toni Gibbs, and Ellen Blau. DNA recovered from the scenes where Sims and Gibbs were found, were later matched, indicating that both victims had been killed by the same person. Detective Little's investigation revealed a previously unknown link between Wardrip and Blau. One of his fellow officers revealed that while Wardrip was on trial for Tina Kimbrew's murder he admitted to knowing Blau. This lead had not been investigated at the time it emerged. Wardrip himself stated that the agency would have been able to find a suspect much sooner if they had "paid a little bit more attention." Detective Little found additional evidence linking Wardrip to the three unsolved murders: Blau had lived one block away from Sims, and Wardrip had been employed as an orderly at the same hospital where Gibbs had worked as a nurse.

At the time, police had no DNA sample from Wardrip, so Detective Little used a simple ploy to obtain one. After being paroled from prison for Tina Kimbrew's murder Wardrip was working at a factory. During Wardrip's coffee break, Little approached Wardrip and asked him for the paper cup from which Wardrip had been drinking so that Little could spit out the tobacco which he had been chewing. An analysis of Wardrip's DNA obtained from the coffee cup matched the suspect's DNA in the cases of Terry Sims and Toni Gibbs. Wardrip was arrested, on February 14, and while he was in custody, he confessed to the murders of Sims, Gibbs, Blau, and the additional murder in Fort Worth of Debra Taylor.

On November 9, 1999, Wardrip was sentenced to death for the murder of Sims, and three life terms for the other killings. In 2008, a federal magistrate recommended that the death penalty be overturned because Wardrip received ineffective defense in his trial. On June 14, 2011, the 5th U.S. Circuit Court of Appeals reversed a lower court ruling that ordered the State of Texas to either give Wardrip a new sentencing trial or agree to give him a life sentence. The case was sent back to the U.S. District Court for reconsideration. In December 2014, the Texas Court of Criminal Appeals dismissed Wardrip's appeal regarding inadequate representation.

In September 2020, Wardrip's appeal was denied by the Federal Fifth Circuit Court of Appeals and his death sentence was subsequently reinstated; the United States Supreme Court subsequently denied his petition for a writ of certiorari, however a portion of his federal habeas claims were held in abeyance and not adjudicated until the resolution of the ineffective counsel claim. As of 2023, Wardrip remains on death row at Polunsky Unit near Livingston. On October 16, 2025, a federal magistrate judge recommended that the remainder of Wardrip's federal habeas petition be denied. According to Wichita County District Attorney John Gillespie, once the magistrate's recommendation is confirmed by the federal district judge and is upheld on appeal by the Fifth Circuit Court of Appeals and the United States Supreme Court, Wardrip will become eligible for an execution date, which his office is committed to seeking from the trial court judge.

== In popular culture ==
=== Books ===
- A true crime book based on Wardrip's crimes, Body Hunter, was written by Patricia Springer in 2001.
- Dark Dreams: A Legendary FBI Profiler Examines Homicide and the Criminal Mind, Chapter 11, "A Serial Killer," profiles Wardrip's crimes. Authored by Roy Hazelwood and Stephen G. Michaud, ISBN 9780312253424, publisher: St. Martin's Press, 2001.
- Scream at the Sky, another book about Wardrip's crimes and related investigations, was written by Carlton Stowers in 2003. The title originated from Wardrip's account of Terry Sims' murder.
- The book Criminal Cold Cases, chapter: "Cold Sweat", section: "Faryion Wardrip: The Silver-Tongued Preacher", outlines Wardrip's religious efforts while on parole and his crimes. Written by Charlotte Greig, ISBN 9781848587007, publisher: Arcturus Publishing Limited, 2011.

=== Television ===
- A 2001 episode of Discovery Channel's The New Detectives, titled "To Kill Again", Season 6, Episode 8, 50 minutes, highlighted the forensics used to capture Wardrip.
- A&E Television's Cold Case Files also covered the case titled "Killer in the County", Season 1, Episode 16, 42 minutes, air date: March 2001.
- Investigation Discovery's Shattered covered the case in Season 2, episode 1 titled Shattered - Seven and a Half Minutes.
- The TruTV series Forensic Files covered the case in 2002, Season 7, Episode 19, 22 minutes, titled: "Sip of Sins".

== See also ==
- List of death row inmates in the United States § Texas
- List of serial killers in the United States
