= Disappearance of Phoenix Coldon =

Phoenix Coldon
- Born: 1988; California, United States
- Disappeared: December 18, 2011 (age 23); Spanish Lake, Missouri
- Status: Missing for 14 years, 11 months and 1 day
- Parent(s): Goldia Coldon (mother), Lawrence Coldon (father)

On December 18, 2011, 23-year-old Phoenix Coldon left her family home in Spanish Lake, Missouri in a black Chevrolet Blazer and vanished. Hours later, her vehicle was discovered abandoned across the state line in East St. Louis, Illinois, and impounded. Due to cross-border jurisdiction gaps, Missouri investigators did not link the vehicle to her disappearance and her family remained unaware of its recovery until a friend independently located it in an impound lot. A subsequent search of the vehicle recovered her glasses, purse, shoes and identification, while all activity on her bank accounts, cell phone and social media ceased.

Dissatisfied with the local law enforcement response, Coldon's adoptive parents, Goldia and Lawrence Coldon, conducted an independent search—hiring a private investigator and canvassing local networks for information—that exhausted their life savings and led to the foreclosure of their home. Coldon's disappearance has since been the subject of an Oxygen two-night documentary special and several true crime podcasts, including The Vanished and Crime Junkie.

== Biography ==
Phoenix Coldon is the adoptive daughter of Goldia and Lawrence Coldon. Coldon was born in California as Phoenix Reeves and raised there until the family moved for her adoptive father's job to Missouri, where she was formally adopted by Lawrence Coldon. Phoenix was mostly home-schooled and played a variety of musical instruments and was the local junior fencing champion.

== Disappearance ==
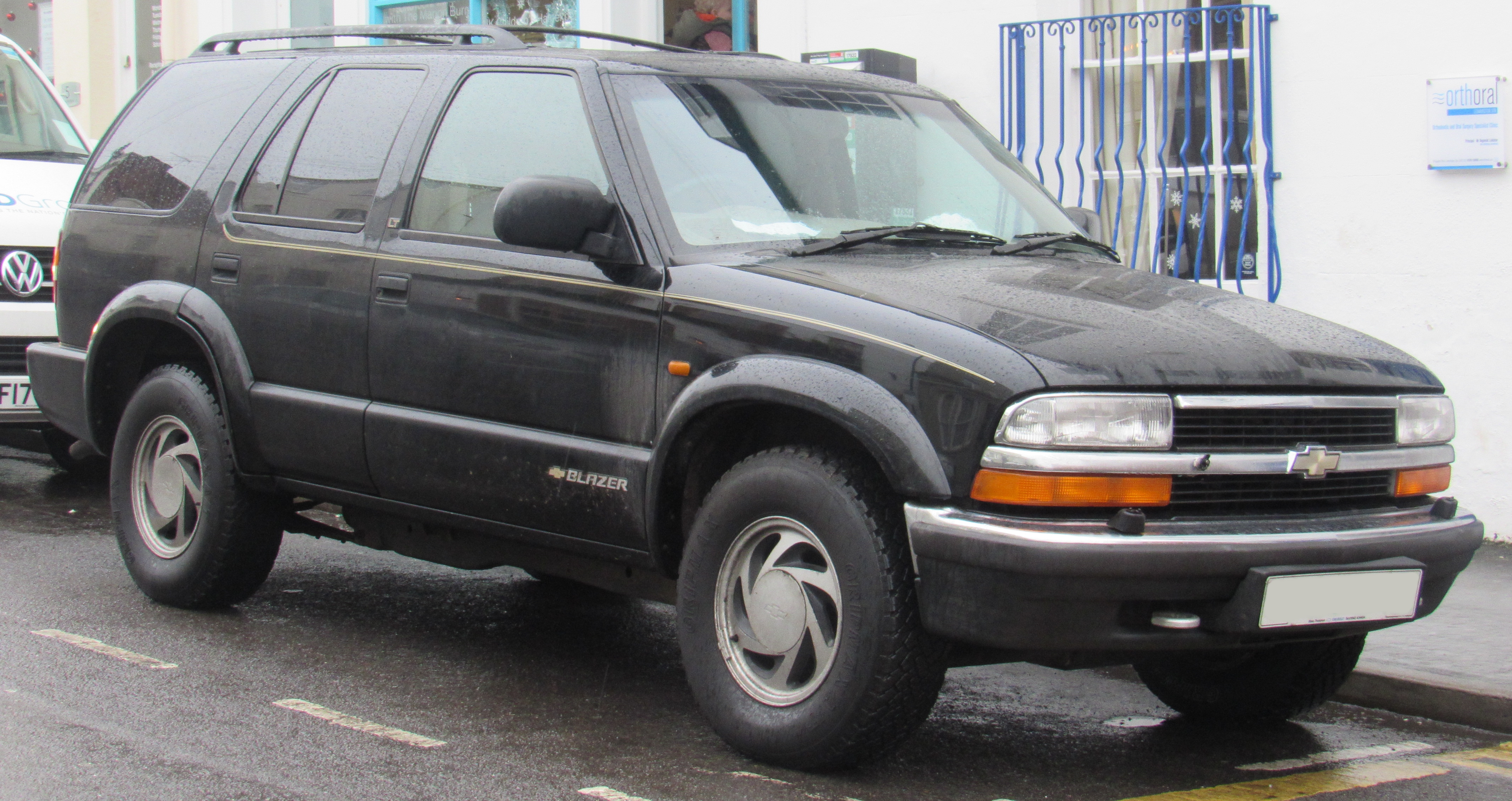
1999 Black Chevrolet Blazer similar to the one Coldon disappeared from

Coldon disappeared on December 18, 2011, after leaving her family home in a black 1998 Chevy Blazer at about 3 PM local time. Her father told reporters that she was supposedly headed to a convenience store around the street or possibly a friend's house. Her vehicle was discovered at a few hours later at 5:27 PM, abandoned (initially reported to still be running, which was later proven inaccurate), 25 minutes from her home and across the Missouri-Illinois state border on St. Clair Avenue in East St. Louis, Illinois. The vehicle was impounded at 6:23 PM and entered into the police database as abandoned; however, because the vehicle was impounded in Illinois, it was not identified when investigated by Missouri police. The family was reportedly not notified of the car being discovered until a family friend searching independently discovered it in a tow lot. Upon an independent search by her family afterwards, the vehicle was discovered to still contain her glasses, purse, shoes, ID and a cell phone bill that had been sent to collections.

After her disappearance, all activity on her bank accounts, cell phone and social media accounts ceased. DNA evidence gathered from her SUV indicated that no one had been in the vehicle other than Coldon and her parents.

== Search efforts ==
Her parents have independently searched for Coldon after raising allegations of a lack of effort from local police. Through the years, they have talked to local drug dealers and sex workers for information and hired a private investigator. Privately funding the search caused the family home to go into foreclosure and the family's life savings to be drained.

== Media ==
A two-night special television documentary on her disappearance debuted on Oxygen on November 3 and 4, 2018, in which investigative reporter Shawndrea Thomas and retired deputy Police Chief Joe Delia discussed theories on her disappearance.

In 2016, her case was profiled on the podcast The Vanished.

In 2023, her case was profiled on the podcast Crime Junkie.

In September of 2025, her case was profiled on the podcast Women & Crime.

In January of 2026, her case was profiled on Independent Detective as Case #14

== See also ==
- Death of Stacey English, a similar case in Atlanta, Georgia albeit solved.
- List of people who disappeared mysteriously: post-1970

Other people still missing, for whom discovery of their abandoned car preceded being reported as a missing person

- Disappearance of Maura Murray – 2004 disappearance of American woman
- Disappearance of Brianna Maitland – Unsolved 2004 disappearance of 17-year-old from Vermont
- Disappearance of Patricia Meehan – Unsolved 1989 disappearance of American 37 year-old woman from Montana
