= Murder of Barbara Barnes =

1995 unsolved murder in Ohio, US

Barbara Barnes
- School portrait of Barbara Barnes
- Born: Barbara Ann Barnes; August 12, 1982; Steubenville, Ohio, US
- Disappeared: December 7, 1995 (aged 13); Steubenville, Ohio, US
- Cause of death: Homicide by strangulation
- Body discovered: February 22, 1996
- Occupation: Student
- Known for: Murder victim

Barbara Ann Barnes was an American schoolgirl who was murdered in December 1995 at the age of 13. The case remains unsolved. Many have speculated that her uncle may have been responsible for her death, but others believe that the crime was committed by someone local to the area. Journalist James Renner has published his theory that the case may be connected to the murders of Tina Harmon, Krista Harrison, Deborah Kaye "Debbie" Smith, and Amy Mihaljevic.

== Background ==
Barnes was described as having been a soft-spoken girl who did well in school. She was in eighth grade and attended the nearby Harding Middle School. Because of the short distance between her home and her school, she walked to and from it every day, along with many other students. Her father had been shot to death in 1989, which had affected her to the point where her personality had changed.

== Disappearance and murder ==
It was reported by a classmate that Barnes was walking to school in her hometown of Steubenville, Ohio when she was abducted on December 7, 1995. After she failed to return home, an investigation began, including statewide searches.

On February 22, 1996, her remains were discovered by surveyors in a riverbed and the cause of death was determined by examiners to have been by strangulation; she had also been raped.

== Investigation ==
Although her body was discovered near the property of her uncle, Louis Boyce, he was not charged with her murder. Boyce has remained under suspicion due to the fact that he reportedly did not pass a polygraph test regarding the murder of Barbara.

A friend of Boyce expressed that it was unlikely that her uncle had anything to do with the murder, stating that it was not likely for him to have harmed any of his relative's children. However, the same man was suspected by police to have played a part in the murder of her father years earlier. Other leads include a Florida man convicted of abducting children who had been present in Steubenville when Barbara Barnes was abducted. Although some members of the police department are skeptical, supporting the theory that she may have been murdered by someone native to the area.

== See also ==
- List of people who disappeared mysteriously (2000–present)
