= Loveland frog =

Legendary creature

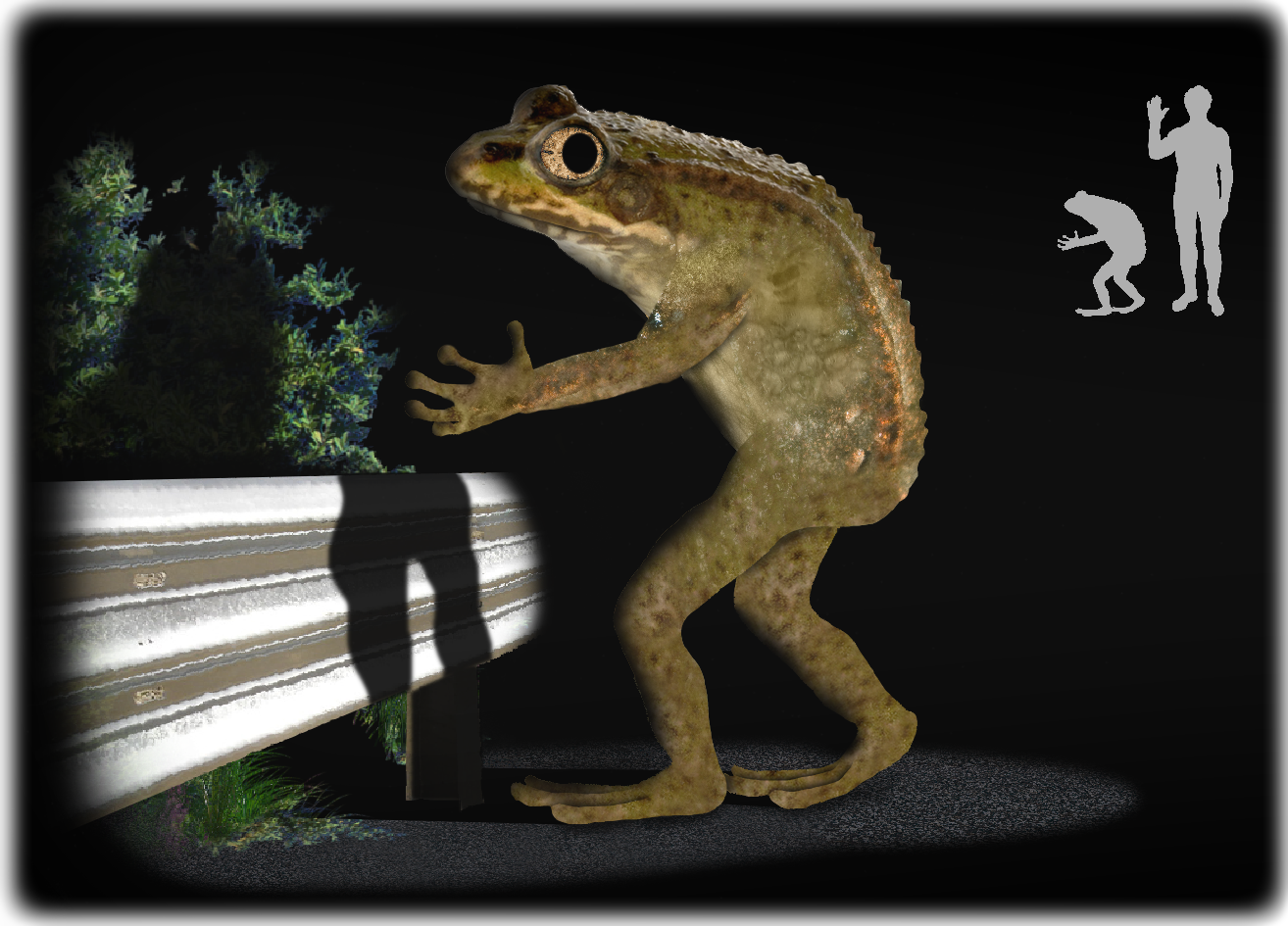
Artist's impression of the Loveland frog.

The Loveland frog, also known as the Loveland frogman or Loveland lizard, is a legendary humanoid creature reportedly sighted in Loveland, Ohio, United States. It is typically described as standing approximately 4 ft (1.2 m) tall. The legend originated with an alleged sighting in 1955 and gained renewed attention in 1972, when a Loveland police officer reported encountering an animal resembling the frogman. Following another reported sighting in 2016, a second officer stated that he had shot and killed a similar creature several weeks after the 1972 incident, later identifying it as a large iguana that was missing its tail.

== Legends ==
According to legends, the Loveland frog was first sighted by a businessman or traveling salesman driving along an unnamed road late at night in 1955, with some versions of the story specifying that the encounter took place in May. According to one story, the driver was heading out of the Branch Hill neighborhood when he spotted three figures standing on their hind legs along the side of the road, each 3 to 4 feet (0.91 to 1.22 m) in height, with leathery skin and froglike faces. In other versions of the story, they were spotted either on top of or beneath a poorly lit bridge, with one holding a wand overhead that fired a spray of sparks.

== Loveland police reports ==
At 1:00 a.m. on March 3, 1972, Loveland police officer Ray Shockey was driving on Riverside Drive near the Totes boot factory and the Little Miami River when an unidentified animal scurried across the road in front of his vehicle. The animal was fully illuminated in his vehicle's headlights, and he described it as having leathery skin, measuring 3 to 4 feet (0.9 to 1.2 m) in length, and weighing roughly 50 to 75 pounds (25 to 35 kg). He reported that the animal "crouched like a frog" before it momentarily stood erect to climb over the guardrail and back down towards the river.

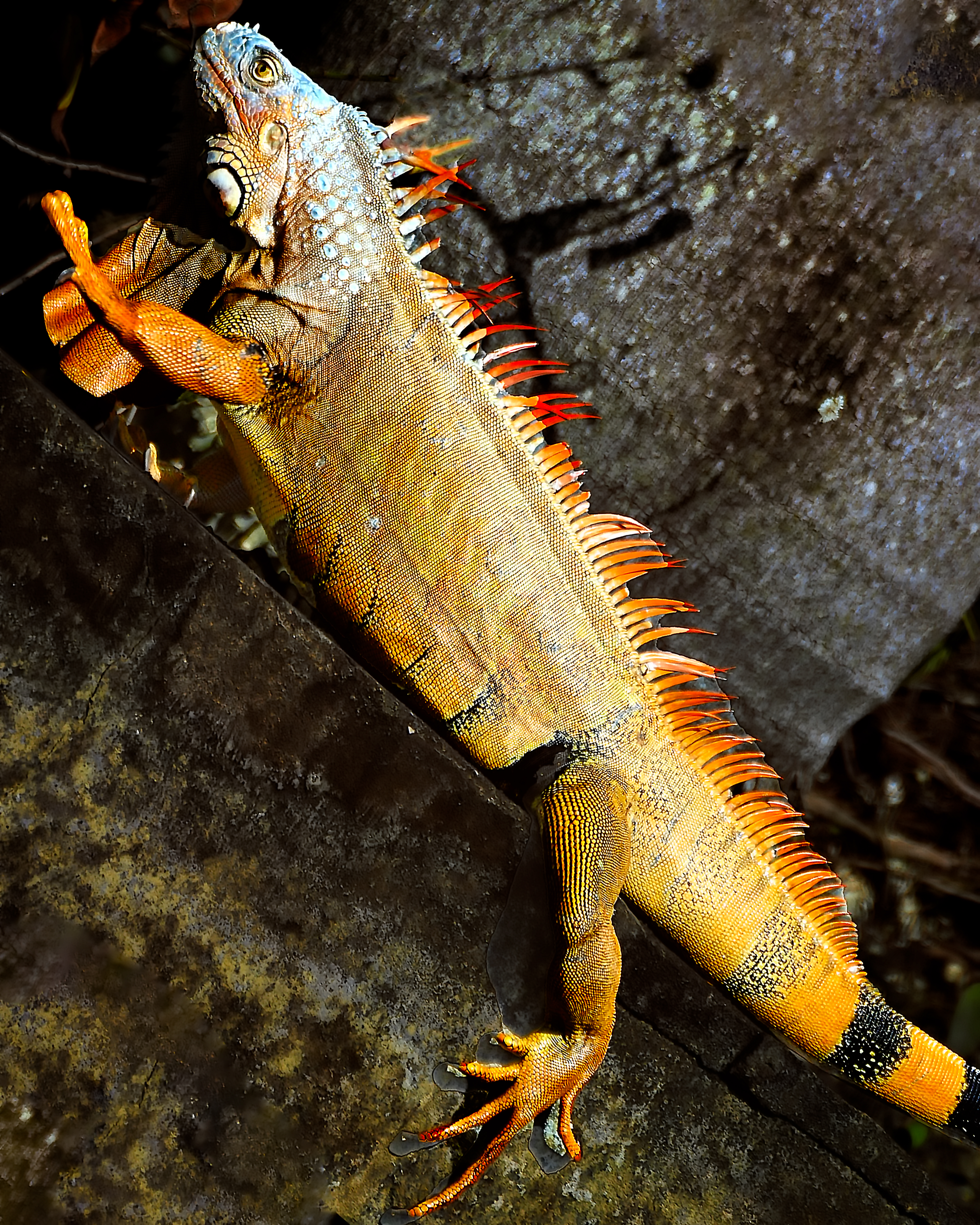
According to police officer Mark Matthews, the 1972 sightings were caused by a large, tailless iguana. The above photo shows an adult green iguana.

Two weeks following the incident, a second Loveland police officer, Mark Matthews, reported seeing an unidentified animal crouched along the road in the same vicinity as the first officer's sighting. Matthews shot the animal, recovered the body, and put it in his trunk to show Shockey. According to Matthews, it was "a large iguana about 3 or 3.5 feet [0.9 or 1.1 m] long", and he did not immediately recognize it because it was missing its tail. Matthews speculated that the iguana had been someone's pet that "either got loose or was released when it grew too large". According to Matthews, Shockey was shown the dead iguana and confirmed it was the animal he had seen two weeks prior. Matthews recounted the incident to an author of a book about urban legends, but says the author "omitted the part that confirmed that the creature was an iguana rather than a Frogman".

In 2016, Matthews commented on WCPO-TV in response to reports of a couple playing Pokémon Go near the river who claimed to see a froglike being standing on hind legs: "It's like Bigfoot and all that other stuff," Matthews said. "I don't believe in Bigfoot either."

== In fiction ==
James Renner's science fiction-mystery novel The Man From Primrose Lane features a version of the Loveland frog.

In May 2014, the Loveland frog legend was made into a musical, titled Hot Damn! It's the Loveland Frog!. The musical premiered at the Art Academy of Cincinnati during the 2014 Cincinnati Fringe Festival.

In 2023, a horror found footage film directed by Anthony Cousins, Frogman, was released.

In 2023, filmmaker Lauren Connolly released the documentary, "Finding Frogman", which explored the history and folklore surrounding the Loveland Frog legend.

== Commemorations ==
In 2023, the Loveland frog became the city's mascot. The frog, dressed as a "frog prince", debuted at the city's second annual Hearts Afire Weekend celebration and appears at other city events. In 2026, a bill was introduced to recognize the Loveland frog as Ohio's "official cryptid", joining the walleye as the state fish and Superman as the state superhero. A campaign hopes to create a bronze statue representing the legendary "frogman".

== See also ==
- List of reptilian humanoids
- Lizard Man of Scape Ore Swamp
