= Forensic Files season 5 =

Forensic Files
- Season 5
- No. of episodes: 19

Release
- Original network: Court TV
- Original release: September 12, 2000 – January 16, 2001

Season chronology
- ← Previous; Season 4 Next → Season 6

Forensic Files is an American documentary-style series which reveals how forensic science is used to solve violent crimes, mysterious accidents, and even outbreaks of illness. The series was broadcast on Court TV, narrated by Peter Thomas, and produced by Medstar Television, in association with Court TV Original Productions. It has broadcast 406 episodes since its debut on TLC in 1996 as Medical Detectives.

== Episodes ==
No. overall	No. in season	Title	Original release date
53	1	"Badge of Deceit"	September 12, 2000
In the early 1980s, women in Lafayette, Louisiana live in fear of a rapist who becomes so experienced that he leaves no clues to his identity. But computer technology and behavioral science combine to give police a new forensic tool: geographical profiling. Police narrow their search to one man, Lafayette Parish Sheriff's Office Ernest "Randy" Comeaux, after receiving an anonymous tip. After matching his DNA from a discarded cigarette butt to DNA recovered from one of the victims, investigators arrested Comeaux in January 1999, and he confessed to committing 14 rapes. He later pleaded guilty to six counts of aggravated assault and was sentenced to six life terms.
54	2	"Dew Process"	September 19, 2000
In 1986 in Wilkes-Barre, Pennsylvania, when 32-year-old Betty Wolsieffer, the wife of a well-known dentist Glen Wolsieffer, is found dead, police are unsure who killed her and injured her husband. Some fibers and a study of the weather patterns on the night of the murder break the case open and reveal that Glen killed his wife because she was sick of his affairs, and his own injuries were self-inflicted.
55	3	"A Woman Scorned"	September 26, 2000
On December 15, 1994 in Catasauqua, Pennsylvania, Joann Katrinak and her four-month-old son Alex disappeared. When their bodies were found in the woods in April of 1995, suspicion initially fell on Joann's much older husband Andy. But some insects found on the bodies reveal a vital clue, as does a long blonde hair found on the victims. The blonde hair has something uniquely in common with the brunette hair of Andy's former love interest Patricia Rorrer. The link uncovers a twisted story of passion gone wrong, which ended in Patricia seeking the best revenge against Andy; she killed his wife and child.
56	4	"A Voice from Beyond"	October 3, 2000
In 1999 when a decomposed body is found stuffed in a barrel in Jericho, New York, it is easy to presume murder. But the body had been placed in the barrel 30 years earlier in 1969. One of the few clues was an address book found along with the body, but years of moisture had washed away the ink, which was completely gone. Scientists desperately searched for a way to reveal the information written on the pages of the address book. They find ties between the dead woman, Reyna Angelica Marroquin, and former home owner Howard B. Elkins, who committed suicide 20 hours after police first interviewed him. Elkins was having an affair with Marroquin, and when she told on him to his wife, he killed her.
57	5	"Burning Ambition"	October 10, 2000
When Seattle, Washington policeman Matt Bachmeier's house went up in flames on July 9, 1996 because of arson, investigators suspected it could have been committed by someone with a vendetta against the officer. One month later, in an ironic twist, Officer Bachmeier arrests low-level drug dealer James Wren, who confesses to the arson. But when the suspect vanishes, investigators start to question the authenticity of the confession. The investigation eventually reveals that Bachmeier was corrupt. He burned down his house to destroy the evidence, killed Wren to use him as a scapegoat, and forged the confession.
58	6	"Memories"	October 17, 2000
On September 30, 1979, Dianna Green is brutally attacked in her Orange County, California home, and her unborn child is killed. After coming out of her coma and regaining her memory, she identifies her husband, Kevin Green, as the perpetrator, and the semen left at the scene matches her husband's blood type. The husband was convicted and spent 16 years in jail proclaiming his innocence. Then, a new DNA test and an innovative computer program lead investigators to question just how accurate the wife's recovered memory really was. They soon discovered the attacker was actually Gerald Parker, who was arrested, and Kevin Green was released.
59	7	"Trail of Truth"	October 24, 2000
On March 15, 1987, Nancy Newman and her two daughters, 8-year old Melissa and 3-year-old Angie, were found sexually assaulted and brutally murdered in their Anchorage, Alaska home. The crime scene has no shortage of evidence, but investigators cannot find a conclusive link to their prime suspect. To solve the puzzle, an FBI analyst designs a unique experiment, in which pubic hairs found at the scene are used to establish that not only that Kirby Anthoney was in the home, but that he was there when the crime was committed.
60	8	"Material Evidence"	October 31, 2000
On July 17, 1982, 11-year-old Krista Harrison was abducted from a park in Marshallville, Ohio, and her body was found 6 days later. She had been raped and murdered. There were few clues to the killer's identity, but authorities were intrigued by unusual orange fibers on clothing found near the victim. Months went by, and the case went cold, until a van turned up with what appeared to be the same orange fibers. The latest in forensic technology was able to determine that there was a connection between the van and the victim. The van's owner, Robert Anthony Buell, was convicted of rape and murder and sentenced to death. The murder of Tina Harmon was compared to the Krista Harrison case.
61	9	"'Kill'igraphy"	November 7, 2000
This examination of the role an autopsy plays in a murder investigation focuses on the suspicious October 4, 1997 death of Ringgold, Georgia resident Virginia Ridley. Police charged her husband Alvin "The Zenith Man" Ridley with murder, but a medical examiner discovered that she died of natural causes.
62	10	"Nursery Crimes"	November 14, 2000
A police investigation of a Kerrville, Texas pediatrician, after the mysterious death of one of her patients in 1982, leads them to a San Antonio, Texas hospital, Bexar County Hospital (now University Health System), where the pediatric mortality rate from the late 1970s through 1982 was higher than at any hospital in the country. The common link was nurse Genene Jones, but proving the connection seems impossible until an international team of doctors uncovers an unlikely murder weapon. Jones is believed to have killed over 60 infants.
63	11	"Lasting Impression"	November 21, 2000
In 1996, when the decomposed body of a teenage girl is discovered in Easton, Pennsylvania, police have no clues to her identity. Weeks earlier, stabbing victim Kathy Sagusti told investigators that she thought she might have heard a murder taking place in her basement. Investigators eventually discover the identity of the girl as Richezza Williams, a 13-year-old runaway from Long Island, New York. Sagusti positively identifies her as the murder victim and says that Corey Maeweather, Kwame Henry, and Stanley Obas were the murderers. To prove it, investigators turn to bug larvae found on the body and a surprise piece of evidence: a tiny wad of chewing gum found near the victim's body.
64	12	"Foundation of Lies"	November 28, 2000
Police suspect John F. Boyle Jr. in the New Year’s Eve 1989 disappearance of his wife, 44-year-old Noreen, from their Mansfield, Ohio home when he signs mortgage papers for a new house in Erie, Pennsylvania with a woman pretending to be his spouse. After witnesses see Dr. Boyle near an area where a new pile of concrete was found, and the recollections of their 12-year-old son, Collier, regarding what he heard the night his mother went missing, the police find Noreen's body in the basement of Dr. Boyle's new house. Boyle killed Noreen during yet another fight over his infidelity and buried her in the new house. Boyle was arrested for murdering his wife and sent to prison.
65	13	"Unholy Vows"	December 5, 2000
The story of Archbishop Valerian D. Trifa, former head of the Romanian Orthodox Church in America, is related. Following World War II, Trifa emigrated from Bucharest, Romania to the United States. In 1957, survivors of Nazi atrocities in Romania recognized him as having directed a bloody 1941 pogrom against Jews. His United States citizenship was revoked, and he was deported to Portugal in 1984. He died just three years later.
66	14	"Broken Promises"	December 12, 2000
On February 1, 1988, Russ Stager, a popular Durham, North Carolina high school gym teacher and National Guardsman, was found dead of what appeared to be an accidental gunshot wound. His ex-wife, Jolynn Snow, became suspicious. She thinks that his second wife, Barbara Stager, may have planned his murder. When police learn that Barbara's previous husband, Larry Ford, died in almost identical circumstances almost a decade earlier, they re-examine the crime scene and find evidence that Russ's death was no accident. But one of Coach Stager's former students is the one who breaks the case when he finds a cassette tape recorded by Stager just before his death, that tells the true story of the nine strange years of his second marriage and his new wife's insatiable greed. The tape is played in court, and Barbara Stager is convicted of her husband's murder.
67	15	"Time Will Tell"	December 19, 2000
In this 1996 international case of extortion, murder, and stolen identities, a Canadian scam-artist Albert Johnson Walker assumes the identity of co-worker Ronald Platt in Harrogate, England as part of a money-laundering scheme. Platt later turns up dead in an ocean, with an anchor tied around his torso. The only clues to his real identity are a Rolex watch and a maple leaf tattoo. The anchor used to sink Platt's dead body ultimately sunk Walker.
68	16	"Second Shot at Love"	December 26, 2000
In 1996, when heart surgeon Dr. Darryl Sutorius is found dead in the basement of his upscale Cincinnati, Ohio home, police assume that he committed suicide. Friends and family indicate that he suffered prolonged bouts of depression and had spoken of killing himself. But, further investigation reveals that his new wife Della Sutorius has a history of violence and an insatiable desire for money. The story of how he died is finally decided in court, as teams of forensic scientists face-off to prove the doctor died not at his own hand, but at the hand of his wife, who is convicted of first-degree murder.
69	17	"Journey to Justice"	January 2, 2001
On June 23, 1992, 6-year-old Nicole Rae Walker was killed in a hit-and-run in her Dania Beach, Florida neighborhood. Investigators find a link between habitual drunk driver Ken Pierce and the fatal hit-and-run. The prosecutor combines the talents of an accident reconstruction expert with a video specialist to create graphic demonstration of the moment of impact. This was the first case in which video in the courtroom withstood an appeal and helped make video testimony viable in other cases. Pierce was found guilty of vehicular homicide and sentenced to 40 years in prison.
70	18	"Video Diary"	January 9, 2001
On October 10, 1998, when Lansing, Michigan convenience store employee Wanda Mason is found dead, having been shot at point blank range, investigators find that the entire murder has been caught on the store's videotape security camera. But the image of the killer is so degraded that it seems impossible to positively identify him, until old fashioned forensic science and space age technology come together to reveal the identity of the killer as Ronald Leon Allen.
71	19	"Deadly Knowledge"	January 16, 2001
In 1995, in Farmington Hills, Michigan when 23-year-old college student Tina Biggar goes missing, her boyfriend and family fear that she has been murdered. A police investigation reveals details about her past that no one, not even her closest friends, suspected: She was a student by day and a $100-an-hour call-girl by night. Her many clients were all suspects in her disappearance, as was her boyfriend. But when her body is discovered two weeks after her disappearance, police obtain evidence that reveals that her killer was former client Kenneth Ray Tranchida, as well as more details about her bizarre double-life and its tragic consequences.
