= Disappearance of Leah Roberts =

2000 U.S. missing persons case

Leah Toby Roberts
- Roberts shortly before her 2000 disappearance
- Born: July 23, 1976; Durham, North Carolina, U.S.
- Disappeared: March 13, 2000 (aged 23); Bellingham, Washington, U.S.
- Status: Missing for 26 years, 6 months and 20 days
- Known for: Disappearance after cross-country trip
- Height: 5 ft 6 in (1.68 m)

Locations
1 Last known location in restaurant, Bellingham Fair Pkway Mall.
2 Jeep found crashed.

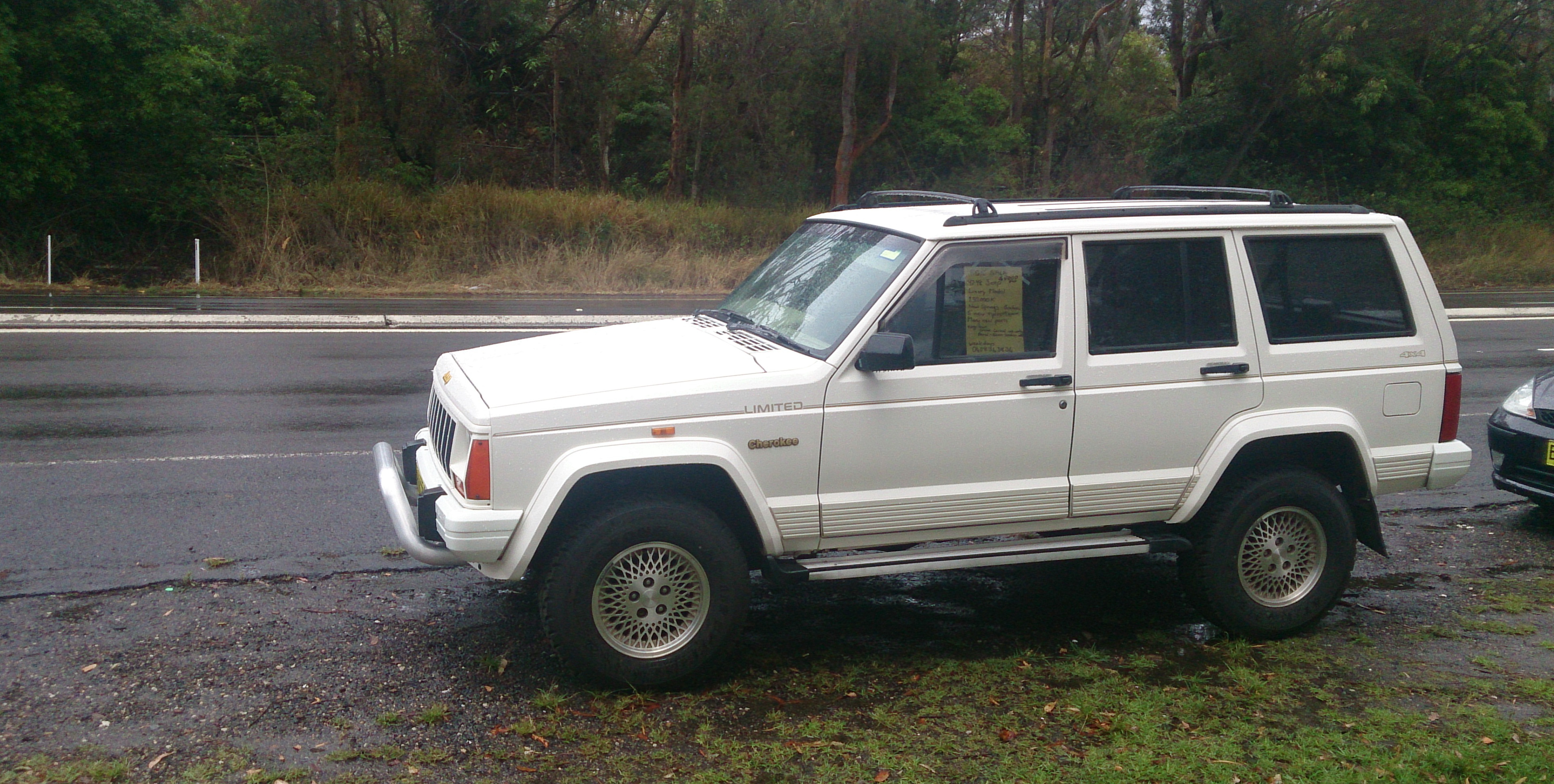
Similar white 1990s Jeep Cherokee

On March 13, 2000, Leah Roberts, a 23-year-old from Durham, North Carolina, disappeared after leaving a restaurant in Bellingham, Washington, where she had arrived following a four-day drive across the country. She has not been seen since. Five days later, on March 18, her Jeep was found wrecked and abandoned at the bottom of an embankment off a road in the Mount Baker-Snoqualmie National Forest. Years later, investigators determined that the vehicle's starter motor had been tampered with, suggesting the crash may have been staged.

Roberts had left Durham unexpectedly, leaving rent money and a note for her housemate indicating she might return in a few weeks. She had told friends she wanted to take a road trip inspired by the work of author Jack Kerouac. In the years leading up to her disappearance, Roberts had experienced the deaths of both parents and survived a serious car accident. She withdrew from North Carolina State University one semester before graduation, and her siblings later recalled that she appeared directionless during that period.

Her disappearance has been featured on Unsolved Mysteries and Disappeared, but few substantive leads have emerged. In 2005, volunteers from a North Carolina missing-persons awareness group organized a cross-country caravan to draw attention to her case and others, an event that has since become an annual tradition.

== Background ==
Leah Toby Roberts was born on July 23, 1976, in Durham, North Carolina. She has a sister, Kara, and a brother, Heath. When Leah was aged 17, her father was diagnosed with a chronic lung illness. Roberts began college at North Carolina State University (NCSU) in nearby Raleigh, majoring in Spanish and anthropology.

=== Challenges during college ===
During her sophomore year at NCSU, Roberts's mother died suddenly from heart disease. Soon after, in the fall of 1998, Roberts was involved in a serious car accident that resulted in a punctured lung and a shattered femur. Surgeons implanted a metal rod next to her femur to help it heal. She later told Kara that she felt "born again" after her recovery. In the spring of the next year, just three weeks before she was scheduled to leave for Costa Rica for a field program, Roberts's father died. She decided to continue with the program. Since she was leaving the country and no longer had living parents, Roberts granted Kara power of attorney over her bank accounts.

=== Leaving college ===
By the time Leah was 22 she had lost both of her parents and here she is on the verge of graduating from college and I think she just really felt lost and didn't have a lot of direction and I feel like she took this trip as a soul-searching trip.

— Kara Roberts, on Larry King Live

Against the wishes of her older siblings, Roberts dropped out of NCSU only months before completing her degree. Afterwards, she learned to play the guitar, took up photography and adopted a pet kitten she named Bea. Roberts also began spending time in local coffeehouses, writing poetry about the meaning of life and making new friends. With one, Jeannine Quiller, and with her roommate, Nicole Bennett, Roberts discussed the idea of emulating Beat Generation novelist Jack Kerouac and going on a road trip to the Western United States.

== Disappearance ==
On the morning of March 9, 2000, Roberts talked on the phone with Kara about her uncertain future plans. The conversation ended with the understanding that the two would see each other soon. Later, in the early afternoon, Roberts and her roommate Nicole agreed to do some babysitting together the next day. Nicole left for work and returned later, at which point she noticed that Roberts and her white 1993 Jeep Cherokee were missing. Because she had not maintained a consistent schedule since she dropped out of school, Nicole was not initially concerned about Roberts's absence.

The next day, Roberts missed the babysitting appointment. By the end of March 11, she was still absent, and her friends and family had been attempting to contact her. On March 13, Kara reported her sister missing to the Durham Police Department.

== Investigation ==
=== Note, bank records, and security camera footage ===
On March 14, Kara and Nicole searched Roberts's room. Many of her clothes and her kitten, Bea, were missing. Kara and Nicole also found a note reading, "I'm not suicidal. I'm the opposite," that mentioned Jack Kerouac and included a drawing of the Cheshire Cat's grin. Along with the note, Kara and Nicole found a bundle of cash totaling approximately a month's worth of Roberts's share of rent and expenses.

Since Kara still had power of attorney over Roberts's bank accounts, she was able to access her sister's financial records. She discovered that Roberts had withdrawn several thousand dollars on the afternoon of March 9 and that her debit card had been used to pay for a motel room near Memphis, Tennessee. Later transactions were purchases of gas or food, their locations suggesting that Roberts was traveling west along Interstate 40, then north on Interstate 5 after she reached I-40's western end in California. The last activity on Roberts's bank accounts was a gas purchase shortly after midnight on the morning of March 13 in Brooks, Oregon. Police later recovered security camera footage from the gas station, which showed Roberts alone and apparently in good condition, although several times she peered out into the parking lot while waiting for her transaction to be completed.

=== Discovery of vehicle ===
Early on the morning of March 18, 2000, near Bellingham, Washington, a couple jogging along Canyon Creek Road, a side route of the Mount Baker Highway, noticed articles of clothing at the side of the road next to a slight curve at the top of a slope. Some pieces of clothing had been tied to the trees and branches at the roadside. In the woods below, at the bottom of a steep embankment, the couple discovered Roberts's severely damaged Jeep and called police. Roberts was not present at the scene.

Based on the path that the car had taken through the trees and the extent of damage to the vehicle, investigators from the Washington State Patrol determined that the Jeep had been traveling at nearly 40 miles per hour (64 km/h) when it went off the road and down the slope. The contents of the vehicle were tossed around inside, consistent with a multiple rollover. Investigators found no blood or other signs of injury to an occupant inside the vehicle, such as shatter on the glass or stretching of the seatbelt. Investigators concluded that no one had been inside the Jeep when it crashed, suggesting that the accident may have been staged.

Blankets and pillows were hung inside the windows of the Jeep, suggesting that it may have been used as a shelter after being wrecked. Roberts's passport, checkbook, driver's license, clothes, guitar, CDs and other belongings were found scattered in the surrounding woods. Bits of cat food and a small cat carrier were found in the vehicle, suggesting that Roberts had taken Bea on the trip with her, although the cat has never been found. Valuables, such as $2,500 in cash and jewelry, were also left behind, suggesting that robbery had not been the reason for the accident.

=== Search efforts and witness statements ===
Kara and Heath Roberts flew to Bellingham to assist investigators. They visited the crash site, and, with the assistance of the sheriff's office, created a flyer that they posted around the city. They also went into local businesses to ask if business owners and customers had seen Roberts. Among her belongings, her siblings found a box of mementos from the trip that established more clearly when she had arrived in Bellingham: a ticket stub from a March 13 afternoon screening of American Beauty (1999) at the theaters in the Bellis Fair Mall. This ticket suggested that Roberts may have spent a few hours in the city after arriving at the beginning of the day following the five-to-six-hour drive from where she had bought gas in Oregon.

Near the theater was the mall's only sit-down restaurant, where Heath and Kara believed that Roberts might have gone for a meal. In the restaurant, police interviews with two customers yielded information. Both men indicated that they had met Roberts in the restaurant on March 13, where they had sat on each side of her at the restaurant's counter. The men recalled talking with Roberts about Kerouac and her planned road trip. One of the men claimed that Roberts had left with a third, whom he heard her call Barry, and provided a description for a police sketch of the man. However, neither the other man nor any other customer who had been in the restaurant at the time could corroborate the third man's existence.

A few days after the Jeep was discovered, a man called the Whatcom County sheriff's office to report a sighting. He claimed that his wife had seen Roberts, disoriented and confused, wandering around a gas station in Everett, closer to Seattle. After disclosing this information, he seemed to panic and hung up before identifying himself. Police nevertheless consider the tip credible.

For two weeks in April 2000, police searched for Roberts near her Jeep's crash site. Dogs trained to sniff for corpses, metal detectors that could find the metal rod in her leg and helicopters were used in the search, but no new evidence was discovered.

=== Examination of vehicle ===
Investigators continued to examine Roberts's Jeep, joined by the Federal Bureau of Investigation (FBI), who had become involved because the vehicle had been found on federal land. They found her mother's engagement ring, which Roberts wore constantly, under a floor mat inside the vehicle. Roberts's friends in North Carolina said that she treasured the ring for the connection it offered to her late mother and that she would never have taken it off voluntarily. After this discovery, the investigation stalled.

In 2006, Mark Joseph of the Whatcom County sheriff's office, the detective who had originally investigated the case, passed his files on to two younger detectives. While reviewing the case, one of them noticed that the car and its contents had not been fully processed for evidence when it was originally brought in. After deciding to re-examine the vehicle, investigators opened the Jeep's hood and found that a wire had been cut, allowing the car to accelerate without anyone having depressed the gas pedal. This discovery confirmed early suspicions that no one had been in the car when it left the road, and thus it had been purposely wrecked. The detectives also found a fingerprint under the hood of the Jeep and male DNA on an article of Roberts's clothing.

These new leads led investigators back to the man who had claimed Roberts left the Bellis Fair restaurant with the third man she called "Barry." As no one could corroborate this witness's statements, police fingerprinted and DNA tested him to rule out his involvement in her disappearance. The witness's fingerprint did not match the one discovered under the hood of the Jeep, but the results of the DNA sample have not been disclosed. In 2014 mummified remains were found within a mile of the crash site with a metal rod in the femur but they turned out to be another person.

== Case coverage and awareness ==
In 2001, the Lifetime television series Unsolved Mysteries ran a segment on the case that generated some new tips for investigators and reports that Roberts had been sighted elsewhere in the U.S., but nothing that proved credible.

In 2005, Monica Caison, a Wilmington woman who had helped other families find missing loved ones after cases had gone officially cold, became involved in Roberts's case after being contacted by Kara. Caison, with the help of a network of volunteers called Community United Effort, specializes in keeping cases alive in the media after official efforts have exhausted all leads. On the fourth anniversary of Roberts's disappearance, Caison organized a caravan across the country, following her route west to Bellingham, to raise awareness about not only the Roberts case but other disappearances. It has become an annual event.

Caison and Kara appeared on CNN's Larry King Live in 2005. "I really don't know how I would have made it through the past five years without her," Kara stated. "We're just trying to, you know, keep Leah's face out there as much as possible." Investigation Discovery's Disappeared aired an episode on the case in 2011.

== See also ==
- List of North Carolina State University people
- List of people who disappeared mysteriously (2000–present)
- Disappearance of Brianna Maitland, in Vermont in March 2004; her disappearance occurred under similar circumstances, with her car being found mysteriously abandoned.
- Disappearance of Maura Murray, in New Hampshire in February 2004; her disappearance occurred under similar circumstances, with her car being found mysteriously abandoned.
- Disappearance of Patricia Meehan, in Montana in 1989; she drove 380 miles (610 km) from her home for unknown reasons and disappeared shortly after a car accident.
