= Murder of Krista Harrison =

American murder case

Krista Harrison
- School portrait of Krista Harrison
- Born: Krista Lea Harrison; May 28, 1971; Orrville, Ohio, United States
- Died: July 17, 1982 (aged 11); Marshallville, Ohio, United States
- Cause of death: Strangulation
- Body discovered: July 23, 1982; 44 years ago Holmes County, Ohio
- Citizenship: United States
- Occupation: Student
- Known for: Murder victim

The murder of Krista Lea Harrison occurred on July 17, 1982, in Marshallville, Ohio, United States. The case remained unsolved for two years, until Robert Anthony Buell was convicted of her murder in 1984. In 2000, Harrison's case appeared on the fifth season of the American television show Forensic Files in an episode titled "Material Evidence."

== Abduction and murder ==
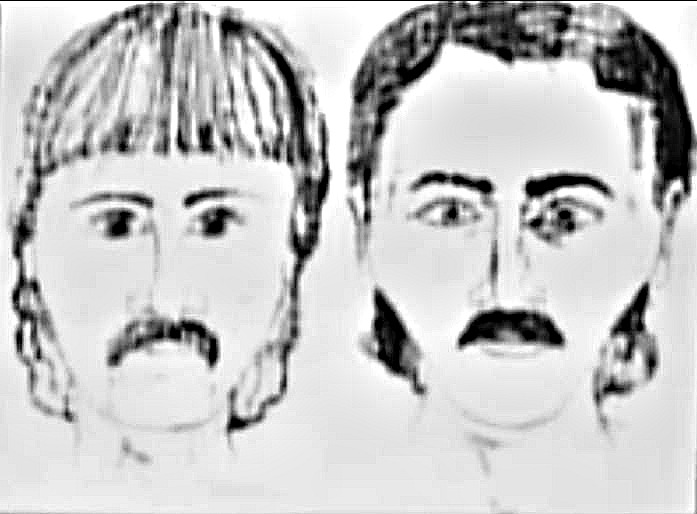
Police sketches of the suspect at the time of Krista Harrison's abduction.

Eleven-year-old Krista Harrison had been picking up aluminum cans in the Marshallville park with one of her friends. The park was about 100 yd (91 m) from her home. It was reported by her friend that a man between 25 and 35 with shoulder-length hair drove up to Harrison in his van, forced her into the vehicle and drove away. Harrison's companion described the abductor's van to have been a brown or dark red color with round windows on the sides, near the rear. After she was kidnapped, volunteers searched for her body across Marshallville to no avail. It was initially believed that the man would demand ransom for Krista's return, yet no contact was made.

Six days later her remains, which were in an advanced stage of decomposition, were discovered next to a shed, in the woods off Township Road 464 in Holmes County, just outside of Loudonville, Ohio. This was about 35 miles from the abduction site. She had been strangled and sexually assaulted with a vibrator and a large plastic bag had been wrapped around her legs. Because of the condition of her remains, police were not able to identify the body until Harrison's father Gerald confirmed that it was his daughter. A Budweiser towel, a bloody car seat box, a wad of Harrison's hair, gloves, a plaid shirt and jeans were all found in the vicinity of the dump site. Examination of the remains indicated that the body was subjected to high temperatures, which was likely a result of her body being inside the vehicle for a long time during summer weather. Harrison was buried in the Maple Grove Cemetery in Marshallville.

== Investigation ==
Nutmeg or orange-colored polyester fibers were found on Harrison's body and the towel near the scene. After examining them under a microscope, investigators concluded that they were likely from some type of carpet. Similar fibers had been found on the body of Tina Harmon, a 12-year-old girl who was raped and murdered eight months earlier. A man had already been convicted on circumstantial evidence in her death and was incarcerated when Harrison was abducted. Authorities then began to consider that both girls were victims of the same person, as they were both sexually violated, strangled, and killed in the same county. The similar fibers on their remains further linked the crimes.

The bag found wrapped around the lower half of Harrison's body was unique and was traced to a factory in Pioneer, Ohio. Such bags were used for packaging a type of car seat, which was black in color. These seats, sold through Sears, were only available briefly through mailing. The box containing Harrison's blood belonged to the same type of car seat. Examination of sales records showed that 23 people in northern Ohio had purchased this type of car seat, but none owned a van that matched the one used during the abduction.

== Capture and trial of Robert Buell ==
"Jerry and Shirley, I didn't kill your daughter. The prosecutor knows that ... and they left the real killer out there on the streets to kill again and again and again." --Robert Anthony Buell's final words in 2002.

After Harrison's body was found, a $10,000 reward was placed for information about the abductor, which showed composite sketches of the perpetrator. No one was arrested until a year later. In 1983, 43-year-old Robert Anthony Buell, employed by the state of Ohio, kidnapped a 28-year-old woman who was working as a manager at a gas station in Damascus, Ohio. The woman's head was shaved, she was shocked with a severed electrical cord, beaten and was bound to Buell's bed and raped. She was able to escape, twelve hours later, fearing for her life, and ran to a nearby house and notified police after her attacker had left to go to work. Such a man had previously preyed on Ohio women, who were usually in their late twenties to forties.

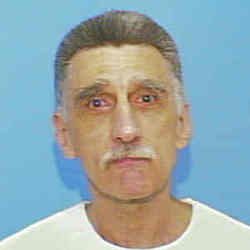
Robert Anthony Buell in 2001

Police then compared the orange carpet fibers found on Harrison's body to the ones in Buell's van, which was the same color as the one seen in 1982. The rear-view windows were a different shape, although it was later revealed that they had been replaced. It was later concluded that the fibers on Harrison's body and the carpet in the van were a likely match and records from Sears indicated that Buell had purchased the same type of car seat that was once contained in the bag and box used to conceal the body. Paint found on the jeans near the dump site matched that on the outside of Buell's residence as well. The jeans themselves were similar to other pairs that he owned. Spray paint in his garage was also matched to some that was present on the box. A fingerprint on plastic concealing Harrison's body did not match Buell's fingerprints.

Buell pleaded no contest to the abduction and rape of the adult victim, but denied any involvement with Harrison's murder. He was found guilty after being tried and sentenced to death in 1984; he was executed by lethal injection in 2002. He denied involvement and was never charged with the death of Tina Harmon, although dog hairs belonging to the remains of one found buried at his residence matched. In 2010, DNA from the crime scene of Tina's murder was compared to Buell's and found to be a match, therefore indicating that he was involved in her rape and, most likely, her murder. Another victim who was murdered in 1983, Deborah Kaye Smith, 10, had wax on her body that was from the same kind of candles that Buell owned. Her body was found over a month after her death, abandoned at the side of the Tuscarawas River.

A former journalist for the Cleveland Scene magazine, James Renner, has written in several of his works that Buell's nephew, Ralph Ross Jr., may have played a role in the murders, if not having been fully responsible. He has also connected the cases to that of the unsolved murders of 13-year-old Barbara Barnes and 10-year-old Amy Mihaljevic. Similar fibers on the latter victim's body were found.

== See also ==
- List of solved missing person cases
