= James Renner =

American journalist

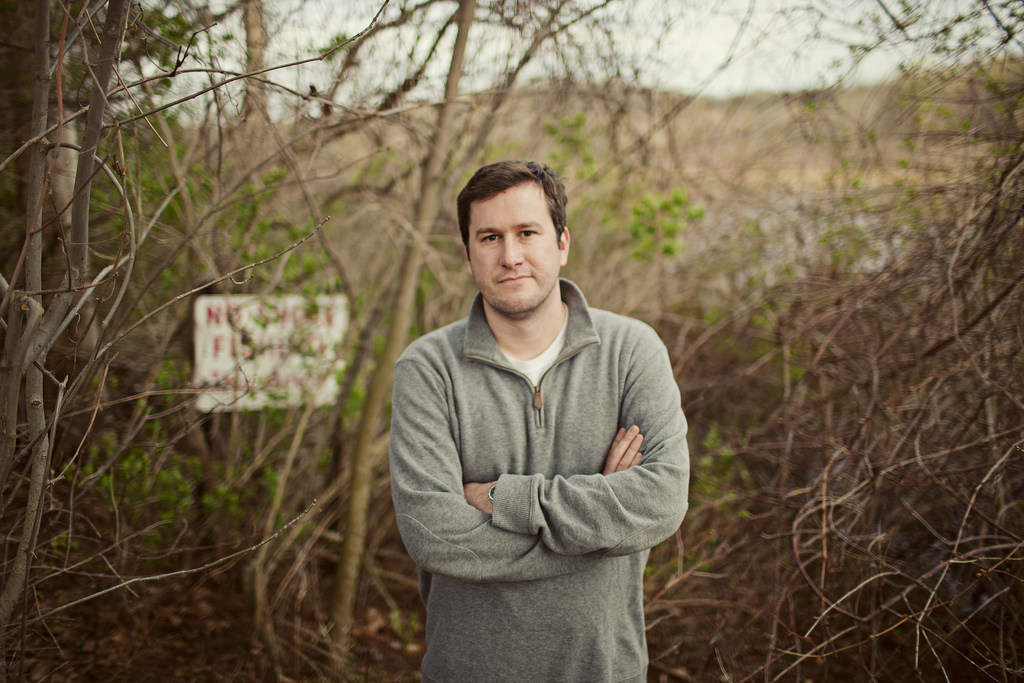
- Renner in 2012
- Born: Cleveland, Ohio, U.S.
- Education: Kent State University (2000)
- Occupations: Writer, director, producer
- Years active: 2000–present
- Children: 2
- Website: jamesrenner.com

James Renner (b. 1978) is an American author, investigative journalist, producer, and director. He worked as a reporter for Cleveland Scene and was editor of the alternative newspaper The Cleveland Independent. He is known for his work in the thriller, science fiction, and true crime genres. In 2019, Renner founded The Porchlight Project, a nonprofit dedicated to offering support for the families of the missing and murdered.

== Early life and education ==
Renner is from Akron, Ohio, and is a 2000 graduate of Kent State University. He worked as a reporter for Cleveland Scene and was the editor of the alternative newspaper The Cleveland Independent. He was also a founding member of Last Call Cleveland, a sketch comedy troupe.

== Journalism and nonfiction ==
In 2003, Renner began working as a reporter for Cleveland Scene and was editor of the alternative newspaper, The Cleveland Independent. At Cleveland Scene, he investigated the cases of Tina Harmon and Amy Mihaljevic.

Harmon was a 12-year-old girl who disappeared from Creston, Ohio in 1981. After pressure from her family, authorities tested DNA evidence found on Harmon's body with new technology in 2008. In 2010, the tests linked Harmon's death to Robert Anthony Buell, a convicted murderer sentenced to death for the 1982 murder of Krista Lea Harrison. Although he was executed for Harrison's death in 2002, Buell was never tried or convicted of Harmon's murder.

In 2005, Renner published a Cleveland Scene cover story revisiting the 1989 abduction and death of 10-year-old Amy Mihaljevic from Bay Village, Ohio. Renner credits Mihaljevic's death for his work in true crime; he became dedicated to finding her killer.

On August 8, 2006, Renner began a blog chronicling his investigation of Mihaljevic's murder. Later that year, he published Amy: My Search for her Killer. In 2007, Renner donated his materials related to his search to Kent State University's Special Collections Archive.

In April 2009, a story written by James Renner about then-gubernatorial candidate Kevin Coughlin's use of campaign funds to purchase private hotel rooms for his mistress, which appeared in Cleveland Scene, was spiked by the CEO of Times Shamrock, who claimed the article did not meet the publication's journalistic standards. Renner was fired after sending an email to the CEO refuting that claim and the article was circulated among other reporters and statehouse insiders. Renner sued Cleveland Scene for wrongful termination and the company settled out of court. Renner returned to Scene in 2014 after Times Shamrock sold the company.

In January 2011, Renner announced his plans to delve into the disappearance of Maura Murray, a nursing student who went missing after a car accident in Haverhill, New Hampshire. His book on the case, True Crime Addict, was published in May 2016.

In May 2018, Renner released the first season of a new podcast, The Philosophy of Crime.

Renner is currently the host of the ID Discovery series, Lake Erie's Coldest Cases.

In August 2019, Renner announced the launch of his nonprofit, The Porchlight Project, which provide funding for forensic genealogy testing for cold cases in Ohio. Its first case would be the 1987 unsolved murder of 17-year-old Barbara Blatnik in Cuyahoga Falls. On May 6, 2020, Cuyahoga Falls police announced the arrest of 67-year-old James Zastawnik of Cleveland for her murder. The Porchlight Project paid for the testing of DNA samples taken from under Blatnik's fingernails and the forensic genealogy research provided by Colleen M. Fitzpatrick and her team at Identifinders International.

== Fiction ==
Renner's first novel, The Man From Primrose Lane, was published by Sarah Crichton Books, an imprint of Farrar, Straus and Giroux, in March 2012. The novel follows a best-selling author as he investigates the murder of a mysterious recluse known as "the man with a thousand mittens." In 2013, Warner Bros. optioned the rights to adapt The Man From Primrose Lane as a film starring Bradley Cooper. When the deal failed to proceed, Renner worked with Working Title Films to pitch a television series pilot that was picked up by Fox in 2017. Feature director Alexandre Aja (The Hills Have Eyes, The 9th Life of Louis Drax) will direct and produce the series.

His second novel, The Great Forgetting, was released November 10, 2015. The sci-fi thriller, set in the fictional town of Franklin Mills, Ohio tells the story of history teacher Jack Felter as he returns to his pastoral childhood home to care for his ailing father and is pulled into a grand conspiracy involving the rewriting of American history.

== Film ==
In 2004, Renner directed an adaptation of Stephen King's short story "All That You Love Will Be Carried Away". King granted Renner the rights to adapt this story as part of his Dollar Baby program for aspiring filmmakers. It was an official selection at the 2005 Montreal World Film Festival.

In 2005, Renner visited reclusive author J.D. Salinger at the author's home in New Hampshire. Renner released a documentary about The Catcher in the Rye and his road trip to visit Salinger in 2009. It is available online, in serialized form.

== Honors and awards ==
Renner's stories have been published in The Best American Crime Reporting and The Best Creative Nonfiction anthologies.

== Bibliography ==
- Amy: My Search for Her Killer (2006)
- The Serial Killer's Apprentice (2008)
- It Came from Ohio (2012)
- The Man From Primrose Lane (2012)
- The Great Forgetting (2015)
- True Crime Addict: How I Lost Myself in the Mysterious Disappearance of Maura Murray (2016)
- Little, Crazy Children (2023)
- Scout Camp: Sex, Death, and Secret Societies Inside the Boy Scouts of America (2025)
- A Cruise to Nowhere: My Search for Amy Lynn Bradley (2026)
