= Murder of Brooke Wilberger =

American murder case

Brooke Wilberger
- Born: Brooke Carol Wilberger; February 20, 1985; Fresno, California, U.S.
- Died: May 25, 2004 (aged 19); Corvallis, Oregon, U.S.
- Body discovered: September 21, 2009
- Known for: Missing person and murder victim
- Parent(s): Greg and Cammy Wilberger

Brooke Carol Wilberger (February 20, 1985 – May 25, 2004) was an American student from Oregon who was abducted and later murdered. Her disappearance was covered by the national media; her murder investigation was one of the most publicized in Oregon's history. Joel Patrick Courtney ultimately pleaded guilty to the aggravated murder of Wilberger; he was sentenced to life imprisonment without the possibility of parole.

== Early life ==
Brooke Wilberger was born in Fresno, California, on February 20, 1985, to Greg and Cammy Wilberger. She had three sisters and two brothers. Described as a devout member of the Church of Jesus Christ of Latter-day Saints, Wilberger was a graduate of Elmira High School near Eugene, Oregon. She had just completed her freshman year at Brigham Young University in Provo, Utah, at the time of her abduction. During that time, her boyfriend, Justin Blake, was serving as a Mormon missionary in Venezuela.

== Disappearance ==
At the time of her disappearance, Wilberger was on summer vacation, visiting and working for one of her sisters in Corvallis, Oregon. On the morning of May 24, 2004, Wilberger was last seen cleaning lamp posts in the parking lot of the Oak Park Apartments, which her sister and brother-in-law managed, on the edge of the Oregon State University campus.

== Investigation ==
=== Initial efforts ===
When Wilberger disappeared, the police began investigating immediately – against normal procedure. Lt. Ron Noble of the Corvallis Police Department said, "Normally, we would wait. Because adults can come and go as they please, and we would normally wait to see if she showed up maybe the next day." However, in this case, police officials agreed with the family that Wilberger was not the type of young woman to disappear on her own. The Wilbergers' LDS ward organized a search by citizens of Corvallis.

The investigation initially centered on Sung Koo Kim, who was named as "person of interest" in the disappearance. Kim was later dropped as a suspect but received an 11-year prison sentence for multiple counts of burglary and theft of women's personal property in Yamhill County. These crimes were uncovered while he was being investigated for the Wilberger disappearance. He was released in December 2012 after serving about seven years.

=== Joel Patrick Courtney ===
On November 30, 2004, a University of New Mexico foreign exchange student who was beaten and raped before escaping identified Joel Patrick Courtney as her attacker. On September 12, 2007, Courtney pleaded guilty to the attack. Courtney's plea agreement called for a prison sentence of up to 18 years, plus 5 to 20 years on parole.

Police eventually linked Courtney, a native of Portland, Oregon, to Wilberger's disappearance. In August 2005, he was charged on 19 counts of aggravated murder, kidnapping, sexual abuse, rape and sodomy. Court documents released in 2008 revealed details showing that Courtney was in Corvallis when Wilberger disappeared, and that a green van he was driving was spotted by several people, including an OSU employee who identified him from a photo lineup. Officials said that Wilberger's DNA was found inside the van, along with her hair.

Courtney was extradited to Benton County, Oregon, on April 8, 2008. He was scheduled for his first appearance on April 9, 2008, at the Benton County Courthouse, facing 14 counts including aggravated murder, two counts of kidnapping, and single counts of rape, sodomy, and sexual abuse in connection with Wilberger's disappearance. Charges were filed despite the absence of the body of the alleged victim at the time; the prosecutor in the case announced that he would seek the death penalty. The FBI had briefly considered Courtney a suspect in two to three disappearances under investigation, but have since eliminated him as a suspect.

It was revealed through court deposition and Courtney's confession that he had abducted Wilberger from the Oaks Park Apartments parking lot on the morning of May 24, 2004. He then drove her into the woods outside of town. He returned to town to buy food while he still had Wilberger bound in his van. According to Courtney, he kept her alive throughout the night before raping her the next morning. He then bludgeoned her to death when she tried to fight off the rape.

==== Conviction ====
Courtney's trial was set for February 1, 2010. He was expected to be charged in connection with the unrelated kidnapping, attempted sexual assault, and attempted murder of two Oregon State University students that occurred the same day Wilberger went missing. But on September 21, 2009, Courtney pleaded guilty to aggravated murder, the only crime subject to capital punishment in Oregon, and he was sentenced to life imprisonment without the possibility of parole. By the terms of the plea deal, Courtney was spared the possibility of the death penalty, prosecutors dropped the remaining counts against him, and Oregon officials promised to try to keep Courtney incarcerated in New Mexico, his home state, for the duration of his sentence. In exchange, Courtney was required to provide information allowing Oregon authorities to discover Wilberger's remains.

The Benton County District Attorney announced the recovery of Wilberger's body (without specifics or its location) in a press conference the day of Courtney's confession. It was later revealed that her remains had been concealed in the woods on an abandoned logging road between Blodgett and Wren, located in the Oregon Coast Range.

== Media coverage ==
The Wilberger case was covered several times on the Fox television program America's Most Wanted between 2004 and 2006. An episode of The Montel Williams Show, which aired November 29, 2004, featured interviews with three of Wilberger's siblings, Shannon, Spencer and Jessica. The ABC News program 20/20 examined Wilberger's disappearance along with that of Maura Murray on March 17, 2006.

The Investigation Discovery Channel portrayed the Wilberger story on three different series:

- The first showing was on the crime examination series On the Case with Paula Zahn, Season 1, Episode 14 "Beauty and the Beast" first aired: April 18, 2010.
- The second showing was on the documentary series FBI: Criminal Pursuit, titled "Predator", Season 2, Episode 10, original air date April 29, 2011.
- The third documentary was the Season 5, Episode 5, titled "An Angel Taken", of the series Motives & Murders: Cracking The Case, premiered March 31, 2016.

Dateline NBC aired a two-hour special on the case on February 4, 2011. The Oxygen channel documentary series It Takes A Killer also covered the case on January 6, 2017.

== See also ==
- List of solved missing person cases (2000s)
