= Della Sutorius =

American murderer who killed her own husband (1950–2010)

- Born: Della Faye Hall; August 8, 1950; Auxier, Kentucky, U.S.
- Died: November 20, 2010 (aged 60); Franklin Medical Center, Columbus, Ohio, U.S.
- Other names: Dante Sutorius; Della Faye Hall; Dante Britteon
- Occupation: Homemaker
- Spouses: Darryl Sutorius (m. 1995; murdered 1996): Four previous other marriages
- Status: Died in prison
- Convictions: Aggravated murder Use of a weapon in a crime of violence Drug possession
- Penalty: 23 years to life in prison

Della Faye "Dante" Sutorius (August 8, 1950 – November 20, 2010) was an American woman who was convicted of murdering her husband in 1996.

== Murder ==
Dr. Darryl Sutorius, a prominent heart surgeon in Cincinnati, married Dante Britteon in 1995. Sutorius was found dead in the basement of the house he shared with his wife in Symmes Township, Ohio on February 19, 1996. Though it was clear that a gunshot to the head had been the cause of death, authorities were initially unsure whether his death was homicide or suicide. Dante Sutorius was arrested the same day when investigating police found a supply of cocaine. Though released on bail the next day, Dante Sutorius was re-arrested on February 27 when it was determined that she had purchased the weapon that had killed her husband and gunshot residue tests and autopsy results indicated that she had been the one who fired the weapon on the day of Sutorius's death. This time the charge was aggravated murder with prior calculation.

== Investigation and trial ==
Investigation into the background of Dante Sutorius revealed that her real name was Della; she had begun using the name "Dante" sometime in her 20s. It also showed it was not the first time she had been associated with violence. Her third husband alleged that she had repeatedly threatened to kill him during their marriage; after the couple divorced, she was charged with threatening another man, this time a boyfriend, with a gun. One husband had found knives hidden around the house he shared with her and had been surprised when she told him she "could kill you", while her fourth husband told investigators that she was mentally abusive and he feared her to the point of hiding the bullets to his gun to prevent her from being able to use them. Dr. Sutorius had discovered that virtually everything Della/Dante had told him about her background was false. She claimed to have graduated from University of California, Los Angeles, but in truth had never finished high school. She claimed to have owned a day care business, but had never held a steady job in her life. When he learned about these lies and her violent history, he cut Della out of his will and began divorce proceedings. A week before his death, he was planning to formally serve her with papers and have her thrown out of their house.

Hamilton County, Ohio prosecutor Joe Deters theorized that Della Sutorius had "a serious problem with rejection" after colleagues of her husband reported that he had been considering divorce. According to her sister Donna Hall, Sutorius's approach to men had long been colored by monetary gain: "She said you find a wealthy man and, when they die, you'd get their money". Her mother phoned the Hamilton County Sheriff’s Office and assured them that Darryl Sutorius's death was not a suicide, and guaranteed them that her daughter had murdered her own husband.

Sutorius declined to take the stand in her own defense at her trial. Though her lawyers argued that police had failed to prove that Darryl Sutorius's death was anything but suicide and their client's statements to police had not been preceded by a Miranda warning, she was convicted on June 7, 1996, with the jury deliberating for fewer than five hours before finding her guilty of aggravated murder, use of a gun in a crime of violence, and drug possession. Later the same month, she was sentenced to 23 years to life in prison, the maximum penalty allowed. Judge Richard Niehaus said that contrary to her media portrayal as a "black widow," she was more akin to a lionfish, who attracts prey with its brilliant stripes before using its poisonous spines to kill them.

== After conviction ==
Della Sutorius appealed her conviction in the spring of 1997, claiming that the trial jury had been allowed to hear hearsay evidence of statements her dead husband had made and that prosecutors had made improper comments to the jury. The appeal was declined in June of the same year and Sutorius returned to serving her sentence at the Ohio Reformatory for Women.

In order to defray the costs of prosecuting Sutorius, the Hamilton County Sheriff's department seized and auctioned off Sutorius's 11-piece jewelry collection. Despite the coverage the press devoted to the auction, bidders failed to meet the minimum necessary total for the pieces to sell separately and the lot was sold for a lump sum of US$5,100 (equivalent to $10,200 in 2025).

== Death ==
According to the Ohio Department of Rehabilitation and Correction, Della Sutorius died of natural causes at the Franklin Medical Center on November 20, 2010, where Sutorius had been serving her life sentence since her conviction. She was 60 years old. Sutorius would have been eligible for parole consideration in 2014.

== In media ==
Della Sutorius's dramatic history with her husbands and the public perception of her as being a "black widow" attracted high levels of coverage from the press; her lawyer, ex-husbands, and ex-boyfriends were all reportedly approached by talk show hosts and news broadcasts such as Geraldo and Hard Copy. A spokeswoman for the Sally Jessy Raphael talk show Sally, which also pursued the story, explained that the case was "highly dramatic" and would appeal to daytime television watchers. Despite jury selection being slowed down by already widespread news coverage of the case, CourtTV was permitted to televise coverage of the May 1996 trial. A 2010 episode of Dateline NBC covered the case in detail, interviewing Sutorius's family and friends as well as people who had been involved in her legal cases.

Crime reporter Aphrodite Jones covered Sutorius's case in her 2002 book Della's Web. Her case is one of the thirteen famous murders reported on in the book The Cincinnati Crime Book (1998), by George Stimson.

The Sutorius case was featured in 2005 on the Oxygen Network series Snapped, and the Investigation Discovery series Deadly Women and Fatal Vows. It was also covered in the December 2000 Forensic Files episode "Second Shot at Love".
