= True Crime Addict =

Book by James Renner

True Crime Addict: How I Lost Myself in the Mysterious Disappearance of Maura Murray
- First edition
- Author: James Renner
- Genre: True crime, nonfiction thriller
- Published: March 2016
- Publisher: Thomas Dunne Books
- Publication place: United States
- ISBN: 1250089018

True Crime Addict: How I Lost Myself in the Mysterious Disappearance of Maura Murray is a nonfiction true crime thriller by American author and investigative journalist James Renner. The book was published by Thomas Dunne Books in March 2016.

== Summary ==
After losing his job at an alternative weekly newspaper, Renner becomes consumed by the puzzling disappearance of 21-year-old UMass student Maura Murray. Murray, a West Point cadet, transferred to the University of Massachusetts to pursue nursing shortly before her disappearance.

Although he attempts to speak with Murray's friends and family to gather information for the book, Renner is met with rejection. Confused as to why a family would not want Maura's disappearance to receive as much attention as possible, he begins to look into the Murray family as well. The book occasionally digresses into other topics, such as Renner's personal life or historical anecdotes from the New England region.

At the conclusion of his five-year investigation, Renner comes to believe that Murray was traveling Route 112 in tandem with another driver and vehicle and intentionally disappeared in an attempt to take on a new identity due to fears her pending credit card fraud case would prevent her being hired as a nurse.

== Reception ==
Best-selling nonfiction crime author M. William Phelps called True Crime Addict "Brutally honest, no-holds-barred storytelling. Renner brilliantly covers all the bases here, unravels the mystery, sheds light on his personal struggles while, in the process, making us care for the victim." Mardi Jo Link for the Star Tribune commented, "You have not read a book like this before and, I'd wager, you'll not engage with its like again."

In contrast The New Yorker described Renner as "embodying every problem that arises when online obsessives are infected with delusions of detective grandeur." And Publishers Weekly said "Renner’s personal involvement in the case—and his self-destructive, relentless dedication to confronting the darkness at the heart of it is the more noteworthy component of the narrative."

Murray's father, Fred, and many of her immediate family have disputed Renner's theory that Murray intentionally disappeared to take on a new identity. Fred stated that he believes his daughter was abducted and is dead.

== Television series ==
In June 2017, Universal TV and Infinitum Nihil purchased the rights to create a television show based on True Crime Addict. The show, written by Richard Price, is being produced by Johnny Depp.

== See also ==
- 2016 in literature
