= The Man from Primrose Lane =

2012 novel by James Renner

The Man From Primrose Lane
- First edition
- Author: James Renner
- Genre: Mystery, thriller, science-fiction
- Published: February 28, 2012
- Publisher: Sarah Crichton Books
- Publication place: United States
- Pages: 384
- ISBN: 9780374200954

The Man From Primrose Lane is an adult science-fiction thriller novel by American author and investigative journalist James Renner. It was published by Sarah Crichton Books in 2012. A television adaptation of the novel was picked up by 20th Television and Working Title Films in 2017.

== Summary ==
While working as an investigative reporter, David Neff develops a consuming obsession with the case of convicted murderer Ronil Brune. A decade earlier, Brune had been executed for the murders of several young girls in Northeast Ohio.

David comes to believe that Brune’s roommate, Riley Trimble, actually committed the murders and that Brune was wrongfully executed. His all-consuming obsession with the case causes David to experience severe psychotic episodes and takes a toll on his health. His therapist prescribes a strong antidepressant medication to manage the episodes.

David publishes a book making his accusations public. It quickly becomes a best-seller, and soon Trimble confesses to the murders. David’s wife inexplicably commits suicide soon after.

Reeling from his wife’s suicide, David withdraws from the world for several years until his editor pushes him to write another book – this time, about the death of a mysterious recluse in West Akron, Ohio.

The man – known to locals as “the man with a thousand mittens” – was found shot to death in his home. His fingers had been removed and pulverized in a blender. As David is drawn into his investigation, he finds several strange connections between his wife and the dead hermit.

== Main characters ==
David Neff, a down-on-his-luck author in West Akron, Ohio troubled by his wife’s suicide.

The Man from Primrose Lane (“the man with a thousand mittens”), a mysterious hermit who wears mittens whenever he emerges from his home.

Ronil Brune, an accused serial killer wrongfully convicted of and executed for the murder of several young girls.

Riley Trimble, Brune’s roommate. In his best-selling book, David names Trimble as the true murderer, posthumously exonerating Brune.

Elizabeth Neff, David’s wife, whose suicide left David devastated and withdrawn.

== Reception ==
Patrick Anderson at The Washington Post called The Man From Primrose Lane “ambitious and innovative” and “a fascinating puzzle.” He added, “If you like your fiction tidy and predictable, look elsewhere.”

Crime Fiction reviewer Laura Wilson at The Guardian UK commented, “Fascinating and unpredictable, with shades of Stephen King and HP Lovecraft as well as Douglas Adams, [The Man from Primrose Lane] never loses touch with the human story of loss, guilt and fate that is at its core.”

== Television series ==
In 2013, Warner Bros. optioned the rights to adapt The Man From Primrose Lane as a film starring Bradley Cooper. When the deal failed to proceed, Renner worked with Working Title Films to pitch a television series pilot that was picked up by Fox in 2017. Feature director Alexandre Aja (The Hills Have Eyes, The 9th Life of Louis Drax) will direct and produce the series.
