= Disappearance of Maura Murray =

2004 disappearance of American woman

Maura Murray
- Murray in 2003
- Born: May 4, 1982; Brockton, Massachusetts, U.S.
- Disappeared: February 9, 2004 (aged 21); Wild Ammonoosuc Road, Haverhill, New Hampshire, U.S.
- Status: Missing for 22 years, 9 months and 13 days
- Education: University of Massachusetts Amherst; United States Military Academy
- Known for: Missing person
- Height: 5 ft 7 in (1.70 m)
- Website: mauramurraymissing.org

On February 9, 2004, Maura Murray, a 21‑year‑old nursing student at the University of Massachusetts Amherst, disappeared after a single‑vehicle crash on Route 112 near Woodsville, a village in the town of Haverhill, New Hampshire, United States. Earlier that afternoon, she had emailed her professors and work supervisor to say she would be away for a week due to a death in the family, which her relatives later said had not occurred. Murray left campus in her car and drove north for reasons that remain unknown. At 7:27 p.m., a local resident reported a car off the road near her home. A passing motorist briefly spoke with the driver, who declined assistance and said she had already called for help. When police arrived at 7:46 p.m., Murray was gone, leaving behind her vehicle and personal belongings. She has not been seen since, and her whereabouts remain unknown.

The investigation into Murray's disappearance has been extensive and long‑running. Police initially considered the possibility that she had chosen to leave voluntarily, citing her unannounced travel preparations and the absence of immediate evidence of foul play. In 2009, the case was transferred to New Hampshire's cold case unit and is now treated as a "suspicious" missing‑person investigation. Multiple searches, public appeals, and reviews of the case have been conducted over the years, but no confirmed sightings or definitive leads have emerged.

Murray's disappearance has drawn significant media attention and widespread public speculation, appearing on programs such as 20/20 and Disappeared and generating extensive online discussion. In 2017, the case was profiled in an Oxygen documentary series that described it as one of the first major crime mysteries to unfold in the early era of social media.

== Background ==
=== Early life ===
Maura Murray was born on May 4, 1982, in Brockton, Massachusetts, the fourth child of Frederick "Fred" and Laurie Murray. She has an older brother, Fred; two older sisters, Kathleen and Julie; and a younger half-brother, Kurt. Maura was raised in an Irish Catholic household. When she was six, Murray's parents divorced, after which she lived primarily with her mother.

Murray graduated from Whitman-Hanson Regional High School in Hanson, Massachusetts, where she was a star athlete on the school's track team. She was accepted into the United States Military Academy in West Point, New York, where she studied chemical engineering for three semesters. Believing that West Point was not a good fit for her, Murray transferred to the University of Massachusetts Amherst (UMass Amherst) after her freshman year to study nursing. Some news accounts indicate that Murray was on the verge of expulsion after being accused of stealing from the PX while training at Fort Knox. According to Murray's sister Julie, the matter was referred to a West Point honor board. If the allegation was determined to be true, the punishment would not have been as severe as expulsion but Murray chose on her own to leave the military academy before the honor board met.

=== Prior to disappearance ===
Amherst, Massachusetts (center), where Murray attended university; Hadley (left), where she crashed her father's car two days before her disappearance; and Hanson (right), her hometown.

In November 2003, three months before her disappearance, Murray admitted to using a stolen credit card to order food from several local restaurants. The charge was continued in December, to be dismissed after three months' good behavior.

On the evening of February 5, 2004, while she was on duty at her security job on the UMass Amherst campus, Murray spoke on the phone with her older sister, Kathleen, discussing the latter's relationship problems with her fiancé. Around 10:30 p.m., while still on her shift, Murray reportedly broke down in tears. When her supervisor arrived at her desk, Murray was "just completely zoned out. No reaction at all. She was unresponsive." The supervisor escorted Murray back to her dorm room around 1:20 a.m. When asked what was wrong, Murray said two words: "My sister." The exact contents of this call remained unknown until October 2017, when Kathleen publicly explained the conversation: Kathleen, an alcoholic, had been discharged from a rehabilitation clinic that evening, and on the way home, her fiancé took her to a liquor store, which caused a relapse.

On Saturday, February 7, Murray's father, Fred, visited UMass Amherst. He told investigators he and Murray went car shopping that afternoon and later went to dinner with a friend of his daughter. Murray dropped her father off at his motel room and, borrowing his Toyota Corolla, returned to campus to attend a dorm party. She arrived at 10:30 p.m. At 2:30 a.m. on Sunday, February 8, she left the party. At 3:30 a.m., en route to her father's motel, Murray struck a guardrail on Massachusetts Route 9 in Hadley, causing nearly $10,000 (equivalent to $17,000 in 2025) worth of damage to her father's car. The responding officer wrote an accident report, but there is no documentation of field sobriety tests being conducted. Murray was driven to her father's motel and stayed in his room the rest of the morning. At 4:49 a.m., there was a cell phone call placed to her boyfriend from Fred's phone. The participants and content of the phone call remain unknown.

Later that morning, Fred learned that the damage to his vehicle would be covered by his auto insurance. He rented a car, dropped Murray off at UMass Amherst and departed for Connecticut. At 11:30 that night, Fred called his daughter to remind her to obtain accident forms from the Massachusetts Registry of Motor Vehicles. They agreed to talk again Monday night to discuss the forms and fill out the insurance claim via phone.

== Monday, February 9, 2004 ==
=== Preparations and departure ===
"We don't know why Maura left school... Clearly it was her intention to leave school. Clearly she hadn't a destination in mind when she came up north. What clearly did not make sense was that she didn't confide in anyone."

— New Hampshire State Police Lt. John Scarinza

Shortly after midnight on Monday, February 9, Murray used her personal computer to search MapQuest for directions to the Berkshires and Burlington, Vermont. The first reported contact Murray had with anyone on February 9 was at 1:00 p.m., when she emailed her boyfriend: "I love you more stud. I got your messages, but honestly, I didn't feel like talking too much of anyone, I promise to call today though. Love you, Maura". Murray also made a phone call inquiring about renting a condominium in Bartlett, New Hampshire, where her family had vacationed in the past. Telephone records indicate the call lasted three minutes but the owner did not remember the call and did not rent to Murray. At 1:13 p.m., Murray called a fellow nursing student, though the reason is unknown; John Healey, a New Hampshire private investigator familiar with the case, suggested she may have arranged to give her scrubs to a fellow nursing student. Family member Helena Murray posited that Maura might have called because she was returning scrubs she had previously borrowed.

On the afternoon of Monday, February 9, at 1:24 p.m., Murray emailed a work supervisor of the nursing school faculty that she would be out of town for a week due to a death in her family. According to her family, no such death had taken place. Murray also said she would contact them when she returned. At 2:05 p.m., Murray called a number which provides recorded information about booking hotels in Stowe, Vermont. The call lasted approximately five minutes. At 2:18 p.m., she telephoned her boyfriend and left a voice message promising him they would talk later. This call ended after one minute.

Murray packed clothing, toiletries, college textbooks and birth control pills in her car. When her room was searched later, campus police discovered most of her belongings packed in boxes and the art removed from the walls. It is not clear whether Murray packed them that day, but police at the time said she had packed between Sunday night and Monday morning. On top of the boxes was a printed email to Murray's boyfriend indicating possible trouble in their relationship. Around 3:30 p.m., Murray drove off the campus in her black 1996 Saturn sedan; classes at UMass Amherst had been canceled that day due to a snowstorm.

Murray at an ATM, 4 hours before her disappearance

At 3:40 p.m., Murray withdrew $280 from an ATM. Closed-circuit footage showed she was alone. At a nearby liquor store, Murray purchased about $40 worth of alcoholic beverages, including Baileys Irish Cream, Kahlúa, vodka and a box of Franzia wine. Security footage again shows she was alone when she made those purchases. At some point in the day, she also picked up the accident-report forms from the Registry of Motor Vehicles.

Murray then left Amherst between 4 p.m. and 5 p.m., presumably via Interstate 91 North. She called to check her voicemail at 4:37 p.m., the last recorded use of her cell phone. To date there is no indication she had informed anyone of her destination, or any evidence that she had chosen one.

=== Disappearance ===
Accident site, N.H. Route 112

(44.119272°N 71.936278°W)

Right angle turn on Route 112 facing southwest, showing the Weathered Barn property.

Right angle turn facing northeast, the direction Murray was believed to have been traveling. A blue ribbon tied to a tree marks the crash site.

==== 7:27 pm: Report of car accident ====
Some time after 7:00 p.m., a Woodsville, New Hampshire resident heard a loud thump outside her house. Through her window, she could see a car up against the snowbank along New Hampshire Route 112, also known as Wild Ammonoosuc Road, on the sharp corner adjacent to her home. The car pointed west on the eastbound side of the road. The resident telephoned the Grafton County Sheriff's Department at 7:27 p.m. to report the accident. According to the 9-1-1 log, the woman claimed to have seen a man smoking a cigarette inside the car. However, she later stated that she had not seen a man nor a person smoking a cigarette, but rather had seen what appeared to be a red light glowing from inside the car, potentially from a cell phone.

A passing motorist, a school bus driver who lived nearby, stopped at the scene. He saw the car, as well as a young woman walking around the vehicle. The bus driver noticed the young woman was not bleeding or visibly injured, but cold and shivering. He offered to call for help. The woman asked him not to call the police (one police report says "pleaded") and assured him she had already called AAA (AAA has no record of any such call). Knowing there was no cellular reception in the area, the bus driver continued home and called police. His call was received by the Sheriff's Department at 7:43 p.m. The bus driver was unable to see Murray's car while he made the call but did notice several cars pass on the road before police arrived. Another local resident driving home from work claims she passed by the scene around 7:37 p.m., and saw a police SUV parked face-to-face with Murray's car. She pulled over briefly and did not see anyone inside or outside either vehicle, and decided to continue home. This witness's statement contradicts the official police log, which has Haverhill police arriving nine minutes later.

==== 7:46 pm: Police arrival at scene ====
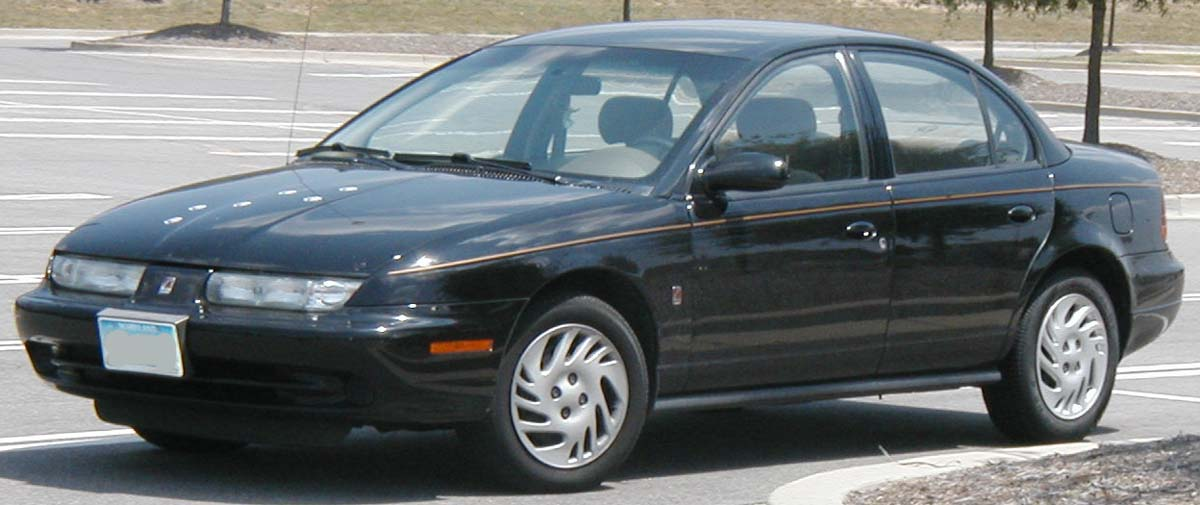
A black second-generation Saturn S-Series, identical to the car Murray was driving

According to the official police log, at 7:46 p.m., a Haverhill police officer arrived at the scene, but the female driver had disappeared. No one was inside or around the car. The car had impacted a tree on the driver's side of the vehicle, severely damaging the left headlight and pushing the car's radiator into the fan, rendering it inoperable. The car's windshield was cracked on the driver's side, and both airbags had deployed. The car was locked.

Inside and outside the car, the officer discovered red stains that looked to be red wine. Inside the car, he found an empty beer bottle and a damaged box of Franzia wine on the rear seat. In addition, he found a AAA card issued to Murray; blank accident report forms; gloves, compact discs, makeup and diamond jewelry; driving directions to Burlington; Murray's favorite stuffed animal; and Not Without Peril, a book about mountain climbing in the White Mountains. Missing were Murray's debit card, credit cards and cell phone, none of which have been located or used since her disappearance. Police later reported some of the bottles of purchased liquor were also missing.

Journalist Joe McGee, writing for the Quincy, Massachusetts, Patriot Ledger, summarized the incident: "At a hairpin turn, she went off the road. Her car hit a tree. At that point, a person came along who was driving a bus. It was a neighbor. He asked her if she needed help. She refused. About 10 minutes later, police showed up to the scene and Maura Murray was gone."

Police traced the vehicle to Murray and initially treated her as a missing person on the belief that she may have wanted to disappear voluntarily. This speculation was based on her travel preparations (about which she had confided nothing to friends or family) and no obvious evidence of foul play. In 2009, Murray's case was given to New Hampshire's cold case division, and authorities are handling it as a "suspicious" missing persons case.

==== 8:00–9:30 pm: Alleged sighting ====
Between 8:00 and 8:30 p.m., a contractor returning home from Franconia, New Hampshire, reportedly saw a young person moving quickly on foot eastbound on Route 112, about 4 to 5 miles (6 to 8 km) east of where Murray's vehicle was discovered. He noted that the young person was wearing jeans, a dark coat and a light-colored hood. He did not report the sighting to police immediately due to his own confusion of dates, discovering only three months later (when reviewing his work records) that he had spotted the young person the same night Murray disappeared.

The responding officer and the bus driver drove around the area searching for Murray. Just before 8:00 p.m., EMS and a fire truck arrived to clear the scene. By 8:49 p.m., the car had been towed to a local garage. At about 9:30 p.m., the responding officer left. A rag believed to have been part of Murray's emergency roadside kit was discovered stuffed into the Saturn's muffler pipe. Authorities would refer to Murray as simply "missing" at noon the next day, almost twenty-four hours after the last confirmed sighting of her.

== Search efforts ==
Murray's car was found, and Murray last sighted in Woodsville, New Hampshire (left center); she had inquired about renting a condominium in Bartlett (bottom right).
Murray had researched hotel reservations in Burlington (left) and Stowe, Vermont (center), on her computer and over the telephone before crashing her car in and disappearing from Woodsville (right).

=== Initial investigation (2004–2005) ===
==== February–June 2004 ====
At 12:36 p.m. on February 10, a "be on the lookout" report for Murray was issued. She was reported as wearing a dark coat, jeans and a black backpack. A voicemail was left on Fred's home answering machine at 3:20 p.m. stating that her car had been found abandoned. Fred was working out of state and did not receive this call. At 5:00 p.m., one of Murray's older sisters contacted her father to tell him of the situation. Fred then contacted Haverhill police and was told that, if Murray was not reported safe by the following morning, the New Hampshire Fish and Game Department would start a search. At 5:17 p.m., Murray was first referred to as "missing" by Haverhill police.

Fred arrived before dawn in Haverhill on February 11. At 8:00 a.m., Murray's family, New Hampshire Fish and Game and others began to search. A tracking dog tracked the scent from one of Murray's gloves 100 yards east from where the vehicle had been discovered but lost the scent. This suggested to police she had left the area in another car. At 5:00 p.m., Murray's boyfriend and his parents arrived in Haverhill. Murray's boyfriend was interrogated in private and then was joined by his parents for questioning. At 7:00 p.m., police said they believed Murray came to the area either to run away or attempt suicide; her family believed this was unlikely.

Murray's boyfriend had turned off his cell phone during his flight to Haverhill. At some point, he received a voicemail that he believed was the sound of Murray sobbing. The call was traced to a calling card issued to the American Red Cross.

On February 12, Murray's father and boyfriend held an evening press conference in Bethlehem, New Hampshire, and the next day the first press coverage was published. At 3:05 p.m., police reported Murray might be headed to the Kancamagus Highway area, and she was "listed as endangered and possibly suicidal." The police report also stated Murray was intoxicated at the crash site, although the bus driver who interacted with her had said she did not appear impaired. The Haverhill police chief said that, "Our concern is that she's upset or suicidal."

Montgomery, Vermont, location of Brianna Maitland's disappearance five weeks after Murray.

A week after Murray's disappearance, her father and boyfriend were interviewed by CNN's American Morning. Murray's family expanded their search into Vermont, dismayed that authorities there had not been informed of her disappearance.

Although missing persons cases are normally handled by local and state police, the FBI joined the investigation ten days after Murray's disappearance. The FBI interviewed relatives from Massachusetts, and the Haverhill police chief announced that the search was now nationwide. Ten days after the disappearance, New Hampshire Fish and Game conducted a second ground-and-air search, using a helicopter with a thermal imaging camera, tracking dogs and cadaver dogs. Murray's older sister discovered a ripped white pair of women's underwear lying in the snow on a secluded trail near French Pond Road on February 26, but DNA tests found that the underwear did not belong to Murray.

At the end of February, the police returned the items found in Murray's car to her family. On March 2, the family checked out of their motel, exhausted from the search. Fred returned nearly every weekend to continue searching. In April, Haverhill police informed him of complaints of trespassing on private property. The March 2004 disappearance of Brianna Maitland in Montgomery, Vermont, 66 miles (110 km) away from Murray's last sighting in Woodsville, drew comparisons from media and law enforcement due to the similarities in disappearances. However, state police have stated there are no links between the two cases.

In April and again in June, New Hampshire and Vermont police dismissed any connection between Murray's case and Maitland's. In a press release, they stated they believed that "Maura was headed for an unknown destination and may have accepted a ride in order to continue to that location," adding that they had discovered no evidence that a crime had been committed. They dismissed the possibility of a serial killer being involved.

==== July 2004–December 2005 ====
On July 1, police retrieved the items found in Murray's vehicle from her family for forensic analysis. On July 13, a one-mile-radius search was performed by nearly 100 searchers, including state troopers, rescue personnel and volunteers. It was the fourth search around the crash site and the first search performed without snow on the ground. Authorities were most interested in locating the black backpack Murray had in her possession but not found in her car. Police stated the search discovered "nothing conclusive."

In late 2004, a man allegedly gave Murray's father a rusty, stained knife that belonged to the man's brother, who had a criminal past and lived less than a mile from where her car was discovered. His brother and his brother's girlfriend were said to have acted strangely after the disappearance, and the man's brother claimed he believed the knife had been used to kill Murray. Several days after the knife was given to Murray's father, the man's brother allegedly scrapped his Volvo. Family members of the man who turned in the knife claimed he had made up the story in order to obtain reward money in the investigation, and that he had a history of drug use.

In 2005, Fred Murray petitioned New Hampshire Governor Craig Benson for help in the search, and appeared on The Montel Williams Show in November 2004 to publicize the case. On February 9, 2005, the first anniversary of Murray's disappearance, a service was held where the car was found, and Fred met briefly with New Hampshire Governor John Lynch.

In late 2005, Fred filed suit against several law enforcement agencies, with the aim of seeing files on the case. On November 1, 2005, a user named "Tom Davies" logged in to a message board called "Not Without Peril", which was dedicated to discussion of Murray's disappearance, and claimed to have seen a black backpack similar to Murray's behind a restroom at Pemigewasset Overlook, around 30 miles (48 km) east of Woodsville on Route 112. Senior Assistant Attorney General Jeffery Strelzin stated that law enforcement "was aware of the backpack," but did not disclose whether it had been taken for forensic testing.

=== Subsequent searches (2006–2010) ===
The New Hampshire League of Investigators, ten retired police officers and detectives and the Molly Bish Foundation started working on the case in 2006. Tom Shamshak, a former police chief and a member of the Licensed Private Detectives Association of Massachusetts, said, "It appears...that this is something beyond a mere missing persons case. Something ominous could have happened here." The Arkansas group Let's Bring Them Home offered a $75,000 reward in 2007 for information that could solve Murray's disappearance.

In October 2006, volunteers led a two-day search within a few miles of where Murray's car was found. In the closet of an A-frame house approximately 1 mile (1.6 km) from the crash site, cadaver dogs allegedly went "bonkers," possibly identifying the presence of human remains. The house had formerly been the residence of the man implicated by his brother, who had given Fred the rusty knife in 2004. A sample of carpet from the home was sent to the New Hampshire State Police, but the results were not released to the public. In July 2008, volunteers led another two-day search through wooded areas in Haverhill. The group consisted of dog teams and licensed private investigators.

Murray's case was one of many cited by proponents of a statewide cold case unit for New Hampshire in 2009. Her case was subsequently added to the newly established cold case unit later that year. In 2010, Fred publicly criticized the police investigation for treating the disappearance as a missing persons case and not a criminal matter, and called on the FBI to join the investigation. Jeffery Strelzin said in February 2009 that the investigation was still active: "We don't know if Maura is a victim, but the state is treating it as a potential homicide. It may be a missing persons case, but it's being handled as a criminal investigation."

=== Further developments (2011–present) ===
In 2014, on the tenth anniversary of Murray's disappearance, Strelzin stated that "We haven't had any credible sightings of Maura since the night she disappeared." In an article published in the New York Daily News on the tenth anniversary of his daughter's disappearance, it was reported that Fred Murray believed she was dead and had been abducted the night of her disappearance. On February 9, 2017, the thirteenth anniversary of Murray's disappearance, Strelzin wrote in an email to The Boston Globe: "It's still an open case with periods of activity and [at] times it goes dormant. There are no new updates to share at this time."

In February 2019, the fifteenth anniversary of Murray's disappearance, Fred reiterated his belief that his daughter was dead, as well as his suspicions about the nearby house that cadaver dogs responded to, stating, "That's my daughter, I do believe." In early April, excavation was done within the basement of the house. Fred had previously wanted to search the property, but the owners did not cooperate. Following its sale, the new owners allowed several searches of the property; however, the excavation conducted in early April found "absolutely nothing, other than what appears to be a piece of pottery or old piping."

In early 2021, the tree at the site where Murray was last seen—which had been marked with a blue ribbon as a memorial—was cut down by the property owner. Shortly thereafter, a request from Murray's family to have a New Hampshire historical marker placed at the site, which had been submitted in late 2020, was turned down by the New Hampshire Division of Historical Resources.

On September 14, 2021, the New Hampshire State Police announced that bone fragments had been found on Loon Mountain in Lincoln, New Hampshire, approximately 25 miles (40 km) east of the crash site. Murray had been to the mountain before and had knowledge of the area, according to her sister. The bone fragments were described as "pretty small," and it was expected to take at least two months to determine whether they belonged to Murray. In November, it was announced that the remains were not of Murray.

In January 2022, the FBI issued a national alert in Murray's case and created a Violent Criminal Apprehension Profile, allowing multiple law enforcement agencies to share information regarding her case. In July 2022, law enforcement in New Hampshire initiated a search in the towns of Landaff and Easton. In February 2024, on the twentieth anniversary of her disappearance, New Hampshire officials released an age-progression photo of Murray.

In March 2025, Steffen Baldwin (formerly Finkelstein), who had been a classmate of Murray at West Point, was convicted of running a fraudulent Ohio animal rescue charity. According to a Campbell, Ohio police officer who investigated Baldwin's fraud, when he was arrested in 2020 an unidentified fingerprint on a CD or CD case that had been in Murray's car was matched to him via police databases. Author and journalist James Renner reported that Murray and Baldwin had been in a relationship at West Point, and that Baldwin had been Murray's student advocate before a review panel that investigated Murray for a breach of discipline. Renner also reported that Baldwin was told in 2024 that his fingerprints were found in Murray's car. Baldwin denied involvement in Murray's disappearance.

In 2026, the New Hampshire Cold Case Unit released a statement that "our determination to find answers for Maura's family and the public does not diminish," and that it "continues to work daily with our state and federal law enforcement partners to pursue every credible lead."

== Significance ==
Murray's disappearance has been cited as "the first crime mystery of the social media age," and generated speculation from the media and the public, specifically on the Internet, in online forums and message boards. Writing for Boston magazine in 2014, Bill Jensen noted: "Now, at least online, it often seems as there's no such thing as a cold case. But when Maura Murray disappeared, the social Web was in its infancy. There was no YouTube and no Twitter. On the day Maura went missing, Facebook was five days old. And so you can read the history of her case as a parable about the evolution of online sleuthing." In 2005, active discussion of Murray's disappearance was documented on websleuths.com, and in 2007, Facebook and Myspace pages were created dedicated to helping find her.

On the Internet, Maura's disappearance is the perfect obsession, a puzzle of clues that offers a tantalizing illusion—if the right armchair detective connects the right dots, maybe the unsolvable can be solved. And so every day, the case attracts new recruits, analyzing and dissecting and reconstructing the details of her story with a Warren Commission–like fervor.

— Bill Jensen, Boston (2014)

== Media depictions ==
In the years after Murray's disappearance, her case received media attention from ABC News, NewsNation and StoryCorps; television shows American Morning, The Montel Williams Show, 20/20, Nancy Grace's Cold Cases, Disappeared and the Dr. Oz Show; in print from The Boston Globe, People magazine, Newsweek, Seventeen magazine, The New Yorker and Rolling Stone; and from dozens of local and regional newspapers, magazines, radio and television programs. It also garnered significant speculation on Internet message boards and forums, with theories ranging from abduction to voluntary disappearance. In 2021 Murray's sister Julie started a TikTok account dedicated to bringing awareness to the disappearance of Maura. Her posts include updates, evidence and tributes.

A 2009 episode of 20/20 compared Murray's case to that of Brooke Wilberger, who went missing in Oregon a few months after Murray's disappearance and was later found murdered. In 2010, Murray was the subject of episode six in the first season of Disappeared. In 2017, the Oxygen network produced a six-part television documentary miniseries titled The Disappearance of Maura Murray, hosted by journalist Maggie Freleng. The Oxygen miniseries described Murray's disappearance as the "first crime mystery of the social media age", having occurred days after the launch of Facebook.

Murray's disappearance was the subject of the nonfiction thriller True Crime Addict: How I Lost Myself in the Mysterious Disappearance of Maura Murray by journalist and author James Renner. In the book, Renner proposed the theory that Murray traveled into New Hampshire with a tandem driver and may have disappeared willingly and started a new life elsewhere due to fears her pending credit card fraud case would prevent her being hired as a nurse, or less likely, was murdered by someone she knew. Murray's father, Fred, and immediate family have disputed this theory. Fred stated that he believes his daughter was abducted and is dead.

== See also ==
- List of people who disappeared mysteriously (2000–present)
- Disappearance of Brianna Maitland, in Vermont in March 2004; her disappearance occurred one month after Murray's and under similar circumstances, with her car being found mysteriously abandoned.
- Disappearance of Leah Roberts, in Washington State in 2000; she made a cross-country trip from Durham, North Carolina and disappeared after her car was found wrecked in North Cascades National Park.
- Disappearance of Patricia Meehan, in Montana in 1989; she drove 380 miles (610 km) from her home for unknown reasons and disappeared shortly after a car accident.
