= Death of Stacey English =

Missing woman

Stacey Nicole English (June 1, 1975 – January 23, 2012) was reported missing from Atlanta, Georgia, by her family on December 27, 2011. Her body was discovered on January 23, 2012, and the autopsy indicates the death was accidental.

== Disappearance ==
According to her family, English was last seen in her home in Atlanta, Georgia, on or about Christmas Day. When her home was investigated, it was discovered that both her apartment gate fob and her cell phone had been left, and the fireplace was still on. She was believed to be driving a white 2006 Volvo S60, which was later found abandoned. Police told reporters that there was no indication of foul play.

== Investigation ==
Investigators cleared St. Louis event promoter Robert Kirk, from being a person of interest in English's disappearance, on January 20, 2012. Kirk was reportedly the last person to see English.

== Discovery of body ==
Some men looking for scrap metal discovered human remains underneath a fallen tree in Atlanta on January 23, 2012. Initial reports from the Chief Medical Examiner of Georgia, indicated that the remains were consistent with the age and gender of English. The medical examiner's report ruled that her death was most likely cold exposure (hypothermia), complicating underlying neurological and psychiatric disorders.

Her parents released a statement when her body was discovered, which stated;

This is only one level of closure. There are other levels of closure that need to take place. So, we thank God for allowing us to find our daughter. There is no doubt in my mind that there had to be some type of foul play involved. The way that she was found and where she was found, and that is what we are wanting to make sure that no one gets tired at this point, its only beginning, there is a lot more work to do.

— Cindy Jamieson (Mother of English), NewsOne

== See also ==
- Lists of solved missing person cases
