= Disappearance of Patricia Meehan =

Unsolved 1989 disappearance of American 37 year-old woman from Montana

Patricia Meehan
- Undated photo of Meehan
- Born: Patricia Bernadette Meehan; November 1, 1951; Pittsburgh, Pennsylvania, U.S.
- Disappeared: April 20, 1989 (aged 37); Circle, Montana, U.S.
- Status: Missing for 37 years, 6 months and 30 days
- Known for: Missing person
- Height: 5 ft 3 in (1.60 m)

Patricia Bernadette Meehan (/ˈmiːən/; November 1, 1951 – disappeared April 20, 1989) is an American woman who disappeared following a car accident on Montana Highway 200 near Circle, Montana. Investigators initially suspected Meehan had fled the scene out of fear or was suffering from amnesia as a result of head trauma. Over 5,000 alleged sightings of Meehan were reported in the months and years after her disappearance, several of which were confirmed by police, but none of which led to her discovery.

The case received substantial media attention for its bizarre circumstances, as well as the Meehan family's cross-country search for their daughter. Her disappearance was featured on the NBC series Unsolved Mysteries in the fall of 1989. The investigation remains active.

== Background ==
Patricia Meehan was born to Delores "Dolly" and Thomas Meehan in Pittsburgh, Pennsylvania, where she was raised. Meehan attended college in Oklahoma City, where she studied early childhood development in preparation for a career in childcare. In 1985, she abandoned that pursuit and relocated to Bozeman, Montana, where she worked as a ranch hand, citing her love of animals as the reason behind her career shift. Meehan had been working odd jobs in addition to the ranch work in order to support herself.

The last person to see Meehan prior to her disappearance was her landlord, who noted that her demeanor was out of the ordinary and that she "seemed hyper." On April 19, 1989—the day before her disappearance—Meehan spoke with her father in Pittsburgh over the phone, telling him she was under stress and wanted to come home.

== Disappearance ==
At 8:15pm on the night of April 20, Peggy Bueller and her father were traveling west on Montana Highway 200 near Circle, Montana, when they witnessed a vehicle heading east driving on the wrong side of the road. Bueller managed to swerve onto the shoulder, avoiding a head-on collision, but the vehicle crashed into the car traveling behind her, driven by off-duty police dispatcher Carol Heitz. Heitz emerged from the wreckage unharmed; on the road, she witnessed a blonde woman emerge from the other car, walk up to her and stare as though she were "looking right through her." According to Heitz, the woman did not speak. Bueller, who remained pulled over on the shoulder of the road, then witnessed the blonde woman climb over a fence and stand motionless, observing the scene:

As I looked out across the accident, I noticed someone on the other side of the fence. [She was] standing there like a spectator - not like it had happened to her.

Bueller watched as the unidentified woman stood silently for several moments on the opposite side of the fence before walking away into an empty field, vanishing into the night. Bueller immediately drove into town to reach a phone while her father stayed with Heitz at the scene of the crash. When police arrived, the unidentified woman was nowhere to be found. Within thirty minutes, her identity was revealed to be Meehan, which police determined after running the vehicle's license plate number through the Department of Motor Vehicles database.

== Investigation ==
Meehan's residence in Bozeman was over 380 miles (610 km) from Circle, the site of the accident

In their search immediately following the crash, police discovered a trail of tennis shoe tracks beginning in a desolate field approximately 0.75 miles (1.21 km) from the scene of the crash. Based on the size of the shoe impressions, the tracks were believed to be Meehan's. Investigators followed the tracks until 3:00am April 21, before finding that they eventually disappeared in the terrain. The search was suspended until the following morning.

Meehan's parents arrived in Montana shortly after their daughter's disappearance, and distributed over 2,000 missing person flyers throughout the area. Her brother and sister, residents of Florida and Massachusetts, respectively, also traveled to the region to engage in search efforts. Local volunteers searched the surrounding mountains and terrain near the crash site by horse and ATV, and the Meehan family also employed a helicopter search to no avail. Abandoned coal mines in the area were also searched, but no traces of Meehan were discovered. The crash site was nearly 400 miles (640 km) from Meehan's home in Bozeman, (Note: According to Google Maps, Circle, Montana, is approximately 381.2 miles (613.5 km) from Bozeman.) and neither law enforcement nor Meehan's family could explain her reasons for being in the area.

Police initially speculated that Meehan fled the scene by hitchhiking, or stowing away on a hay truck that had been parked 0.5 miles (0.80 km) from the crash site, though no sightings were reported to support either claim. According to her mother, Meehan had been experiencing depression at the time and had been visiting a psychologist, with whom she had made an appointment for the morning of April 21. Amidst her belongings, Meehan's family developed a roll of film from her camera, which revealed a self-portrait she had taken in front of a mirror. Early on in the case, it was suspected that Meehan may have been suffering from amnesia.

== Reported sightings ==
There have been over 5,000 reported sightings of a woman resembling Meehan since her disappearance. According to Meehan's parents, within the first two years following her disappearance, they received notices of alleged sightings in "just about every state, including Alaska and Hawaii."

On May 4, 1989, a police officer in Luverne, Minnesota, claimed to have seen Meehan sitting inside a Hardee's restaurant; she had been drinking water alone in a booth for over five hours until the restaurant's closing time, then walked to a nearby 24-hour diner. When the officer questioned her, the woman refused to give her name, and claimed to be from Colorado and then Israel. The following day, on May 5, two other sightings of Meehan were reported: one in Sioux Falls, South Dakota, where a waitress claimed Meehan had sat inside a truck stop diner drinking coffee from 12 am to 11:30am; the same day, a waitress at another diner in Murdo, South Dakota, reported seeing Meehan between 10pm and 11pm in the company of a man who appeared to be in his thirties.

On May 11, 1989, a truck driver reported seeing a woman resembling Meehan walking on a frontage road in Billings, Montana. The following week, on May 19, 1989, a waitress at a restaurant near Meehan's home in Bozeman reported seeing her there. According to the waitress, Meehan ordered and ate breakfast in a hurried manner, and mentioned that she had to go shopping at 9am. Another waitress working that same morning also saw Meehan at the restaurant, and reported that she appeared to be disoriented and talking to herself. The same week, another reported sighting occurred at a horse auction in Billings.

Over two weeks later, on May 30, a woman resembling Meehan was seen by a passing truck driver on Interstate 90 in rural Washington State. The driver offered her a ride, which she declined, and the woman told another passing female motorist that her car had broken down and that she was going to find a phone. Another alleged sighting of Meehan was reported the following week in Tacoma, Washington, by a Port of Tacoma employee who claimed to have seen her at a truck stop on Interstate 5 asking strangers for directions to Aberdeen.

By June 1989, over twenty-five sightings of Meehan had been reported, three of which were confirmed by police. Other reported sightings of Meehan were received by law enforcement throughout the Pacific Northwest, many at truck stops between Montana and Seattle. Law enforcement believed Meehan may have been in Washington State during this time, as her sister lived in Seattle and her (Meehan's) ex-boyfriend, Kurt Fletcher, lived in Spokane.

On August 30, 1990, a transient woman was arrested by police in Coeur d'Alene, Idaho, for littering. The woman bore a resemblance to Meehan, and the arresting officer initially believed it to be her. On September 1, the woman appeared in a Kootenai County court, where she claimed before the judge to be a missionary traveling between Montana and Washington. Although the reported sighting made news in The Seattle Times, it was confirmed through fingerprint analysis that the woman was not Meehan. Speaking to the media and law enforcement, Fletcher noted there was a "strong resemblance" and that the woman had a similar voice to Meehan's.

== Media depictions ==
Meehan's case was featured on NBC's Unsolved Mysteries on November 1, 1989, season 2, episode 6, which would have been Meehan's 38th birthday.

== See also ==
- List of people who disappeared
- Maura Murray, a young woman who also disappeared from the immediate aftermath of a car crash in New Hampshire in February 2004
- Brianna Maitland, a young woman who disappeared in Vermont under bizarre circumstances involving her motor vehicle in March 2004
