= Robert Anthony Buell =

American child murderer, serial rapist, and suspected serial killer

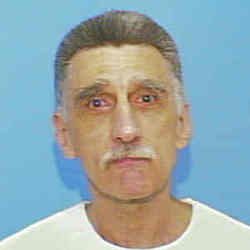
- Mugshot taken on October 13, 2000
- Born: September 10, 1940; Norwood, Ohio, U.S.
- Died: September 25, 2002 (aged 62); Southern Ohio Correctional Facility, Ohio, U.S.
- Status: Executed by lethal injection
- Motive: Sadistic predatory sexual gratification
- Convictions: Aggravated murder Kidnapping (3 counts); Rape (3 counts); Felonious sexual penetration (3 counts); Felonious assault (2 counts)
- Penalty: Death

Details
- Victims: 2–3
- Span of crimes: 1981–1983
- Country: United States
- State: Ohio
- Date apprehended: November 1983

Robert Anthony Buell (September 10, 1940 – September 25, 2002) was an American child murderer, serial rapist, and former planning department worker from Akron, Ohio. He was convicted of the July 17, 1982 murder of 11-year-old Krista Lea Harrison.

Buell was executed by lethal injection on September 25, 2002. His final meal was a single black unpitted olive. In 2010, eight years after his death, he was found to have also raped and murdered 12-year-old Tina Marie Harmon in 1981.

== Murder cases ==
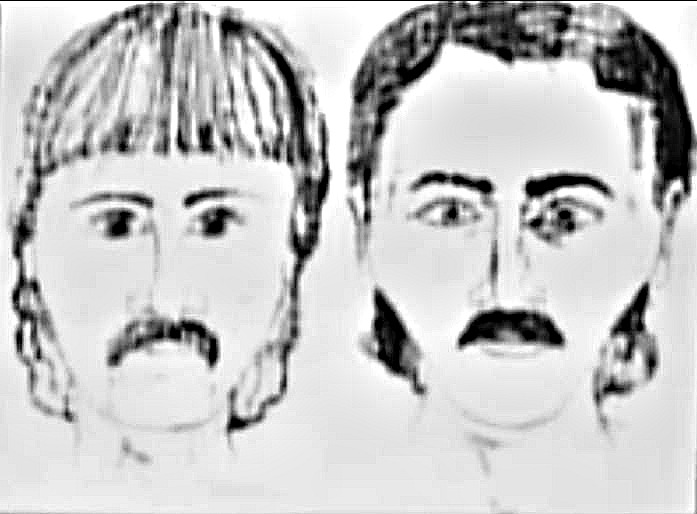
Police sketch of Buell at the time of Krista Harrison's abduction on July 17, 1982

On July 17, 1982, Buell was reportedly seen abducting Krista Harrison in a park in Marshallville, Ohio. Harrison's body was found six days after her kidnapping. She had been sexually assaulted and strangled. Two other young girls have been thought to have also been victims of Buell: Tina Marie Harmon, age 12, murdered in 1981; and Deborah Kaye Smith, age 10, murdered in 1983.

Although strong evidence is present connecting Buell to all three cases, Buell was only charged with the murder of Krista Harrison. He has since been linked by DNA evidence to Tina Harmon's murder. Buell was also a serial rapist. In 1983, Buell raped and tortured a woman who was able to escape and notify police, an event that ultimately led to his arrest. He also raped another woman. Buell pleaded no contest to these crimes and received a 121-year sentence.

Buell was sentenced to death for Krista Harrison's murder on April 11, 1984. Eighteen years later, on September 25, 2002, he was executed by lethal injection, still denying involvement in the Harrison murder.

This case was presented as "Material Evidence" in Forensic Files, season 5, episode 8, made before Buell's execution. Information regarding the 2010 DNA match was later added to the end of the episode.

== See also ==
- List of people executed in Ohio
- List of people executed in the United States in 2002
- List of serial killers in the United States

Executions carried out in Ohio
Preceded by Alton Coleman April 26, 2002	Robert Anthony Buell; September 25, 2002	Succeeded by Richard Edwin Fox February 12, 2003
Executions carried out in the United States
Preceded by Rex Mays – Texas September 24, 2002	Robert Anthony Buell – Ohio; September 25, 2002	Succeeded by Calvin King – Texas September 25, 2002
