= Murder of Tina Harmon =

Murder of young American girl

Tina Harmon
- Born: Tina Marie Harmon; June 9, 1969; Creston, Ohio, United States
- Died: October 29, 1981 (aged 12); Lodi, Ohio, United States
- Cause of death: Strangulation
- Body discovered: November 3, 1981; 44 years ago Bethlehem Township, Ohio
- Occupation: Student
- Known for: Murder victim

Tina Marie Harmon (June 9, 1969 – October 29, 1981) was a 12-year-old American girl who was abducted, raped, and murdered on October 29, 1981, after being dropped off in Lodi, Ohio. After the discovery of her body, she was later buried at the Maple Mound Cemetery. Two men were originally wrongfully convicted of her murder on circumstantial evidence, but later had their convictions overturned after new evidence pointed to Robert Anthony Buell, who had recently been arrested for rape and murder of 11-year-old Krista Harrison. Harmon's murder was solved in 2010 when DNA from the individual who raped her was matched to Buell, who had been executed in 2002 for Harrison's murder.

== Case history and initial wrongful convictions ==
The polyester fibers found on Tina Harmon's body which matched the fibers from the van which was used in the abduction of Krista Harrison

Tina Harmon was reportedly last seen with a man in his twenties after she had been dropped off by her father's girlfriend in Lodi, Ohio. Harmon's body was later found next to an oil well site in Navarre, Ohio, five days after her abduction. Nutmeg-colored carpet fibers and dog hair were found on her clothing.

In 1982, Ernest Holbrook Jr. and Herman Ray Rucker, whom two witnesses claimed had confessed to crime, were convicted of both the rape and murder of Harmon by a three-judge panel and received life sentences.

== Robert Anthony Buell ==
In 1984, Robert Anthony Buell was convicted of the 1982 murder of Krista Lea Harrison. The dog hairs on Harmon's body were matched to the ones found on a dog buried in Buell's yard, once DNA testing became possible. Buell was later matched to Harmon's murder by comparing his DNA samples with the ones found on Harmon's clothing several years later.

As a result of the new evidence pointing to Buell, both Holbrook and Rucker had their convictions vacated. Rucker was acquitted at a retrial in 1983 and Holbrook had the charges against him dropped in 1984. One of the witnesses, Holbrook's cousin, Curtis Maynard, was convicted of perjury after recanting his testimony and sentenced to six to 20 years in prison. Maynard was paroled after serving 13 months.

The nutmeg-colored carpet fibers that were found on the bodies of both Harmon and Harrison matched as well. However, Buell was never tried for Harmon's murder because he was already on death row. In 2002, at the age of 62, Buell was executed for the murder of Harrison. In 2009, when the Harmon case was reopened, it was stated Buell's profile was obtained, but they did not have Tina's.

Cleveland Scene journalist James Renner wrote about similar characteristics of the murders of Harmon, Harrison, and Debora Kaye Smith to the 1989 murder of Amy Mihaljevic, the latter two are currently unsolved. Although Buell was incarcerated at the time of Mihaljevic's death, he stated Buell's nephew Ralph Ross Jr. might be responsible and stated he could have been involved in the three preceding murders, if not the sole perpetrator. In 2008, the evidence in Harmon's case was compared to that in the Mihaljevic case.

Ross was eliminated as the source of DNA from the Harmon case in 2010.

== See also ==
- List of solved missing person cases: 1950–1999
- Murder of Krista Harrison
- Robert Anthony Buell
