= Killing of Amy Mihaljevic =

1989 murder of an American schoolgirl

Amy Mihaljevic
- Mihaljevic's 1989 school photo
- Born: Amy Renee Mihaljevic; December 11, 1978; Little Rock, Arkansas, U.S.
- Disappeared: October 27, 1989; Bay Village, Ohio, U.S.
- Died: c. October 27, 1989 (aged 10)
- Cause of death: Homicide by stabbing
- Body discovered: February 8, 1990; Ruggles Township, Ashland County, Ohio
- Resting place: Highland Memorial Park, New Berlin, Waukesha County, Wisconsin, U.S.

Amy Renee Mihaljevic (/mʌˈhɑːlɛvɪk/, muh-HAH-leh-vik; December 11, 1978 – c. October 27, 1989) was a ten-year-old American middle school student who was kidnapped and murdered in the U.S. state of Ohio in 1989.

Her murder case received national attention. The story of her unsolved kidnapping and murder was presented by John Walsh on the television show America's Most Wanted during the program's early years. To date, her killer has not been found, yet the case remains active; new information in 2007 and 2013 has increased hopes of resolving the case.

In February 2021, it was announced that a person of interest emerged in the case after a woman contacted authorities in 2019 with potentially valuable information.

== Disappearance and murder ==
On October 27, 1989, Amy Mihaljevic walked from Bay Middle School to the Bay Square Shopping Center and was kidnapped from the center in Bay Village, Ohio, a suburb of Cleveland.

An adult male had contacted Mihaljevic by telephone and arranged to meet her at the shopping center on the pretext of his working with Amy's mother and buying a gift to celebrate her mother's supposed promotion. The caller advised Amy to keep the gift a secret, but she informed her brother and a friend about the caller. Two witnesses at the shopping center later described seeing a man lead Amy to gold-colored Oldsmobile car and were able to help create a composite image of the suspect.

On February 8, 1990, Amy's body was found in a field, close to the road, off County Road 1181, Ruggles Township in rural Ashland County, Ohio. She died of multiple stab wounds.

Evidence found at the scene of the crime suggests Mihaljevic's body was probably dumped there shortly after her abduction. Based on findings by the Cuyahoga County coroner, Mihaljevic's last meal was some soy substance, possibly a vegetarian chicken product or Chinese food. Other evidence includes yellow/gold colored fibers on her body. It appears her killer also took several souvenirs including the girl's horse riding boots, her denim backpack, a binder with "Buick, Best in Class" written on the front clasp, and turquoise earrings in the shape of horse heads. Mitochondrial DNA from the crime scene was sampled, which may be used to compare to suspects.

== Investigation ==
The Bay Village Police and the FBI conducted an extensive investigation into her disappearance and murder. The case generated thousands of leads. Dozens of suspects were asked to take lie-detector tests, but no one has ever been charged. Law enforcement continues to pursue leads and monitor suspects to the present day. Twenty thousand interviews have taken place during the investigation. This case was described as involving the most extensive search in Ohio since the 1951 disappearance of Beverly Potts.

In November 2006, it was revealed several other young girls had received phone calls similar to the ones Mihaljevic received in the weeks before her abduction. The unknown male caller claimed he worked with the girl's mother and wanted help buying a present to celebrate her promotion. The girls who received these calls lived in North Olmsted, a suburb near Bay Village; some had unlisted phone numbers. This new information was considered significant by investigators. Mihaljevic and the others who received such calls had all visited the local Lake Erie Nature and Science Center, which had a visitors' logbook by the front door. The girls may have signed the book and added personal information, including phone numbers and addresses.

Bay Village police collected DNA samples from several potential suspects in the case in December 2006. Author James Renner identified as a possible suspect a man who had worked in the Cleveland area as a science teacher, had volunteered at the Lake Erie Nature and Science Center, and whose former students alleged he had a pattern of inappropriate sexual comments. At the time of Amy's kidnapping the teacher drove a gold Oldsmobile car similar to that reported by witnesses at the kidnapping site, and a similar car was also reported near the place Amy's body was found. This teacher had connections to Bay Village and was raised in the area where Amy's body was found. The suspect also unexpectedly moved out of Ohio shortly after the Amy Mihaljevic kidnapping and murder, even neglecting accumulated pension benefits. Renner also reports how this teacher's friends and family had been interviewed by police in regards to possible connections to the Amy Mihaljevic case and states the suspect had hired legal counsel in early 2007.

In late 2013, investigator Phil Torsney returned from retirement to work on the case, to which he had been assigned initially after the murder. Torsney is well known for aiding in the capture of Whitey Bulger, who was a long-time member of the FBI Top Ten Most Wanted. Torsney stated he believed Mihaljevic was transported out of Bay Village after she was kidnapped, as the town is "too dense, too close-knit, to be a likely place to commit murder." However, he stated that the murder likely took place in Ashland County, which the murderer was probably familiar with.

The FBI announced in March 2014 that a $25,000 reward is available to anyone who can provide information that leads to the arrest and conviction of the killer of Mihaljevic. In October, it was increased to $27,000.

In 2016, it was discovered a blanket and curtain near Mihaljevic's body had hairs similar to those of Mihaljevic's dog. They were possibly used to conceal the victim's body before she was left in the field.

In 2018, investigators were also following a potential link between identity thief Robert Ivan Nichols (alias Joseph Newton Chandler III) and the murder of Mihaljevic. In 2019, authorities stated that they have extensively investigated all suspects in the case and feel that if her killer were identified, he would likely be a part of their list.

=== 2021 update ===
On the 31st anniversary of discovering Mihaljevic's remains, a significant development in the case was announced. A man aged 64 was implicated by a former girlfriend. The girlfriend alleged he was uncharacteristically absent from their residence the evening of the kidnapping, and she also noted they lived about a mile and a half from the abduction site. The man telephoned her late that evening, inquiring if she had seen media releases about the abduction. He was employed in the Bay Village, and his niece was in the same grade as Mihaljevic.

Police interviews with the man included what a detective described as "very suspicious statements", including saying he had met Amy Mihaljevic's mother at a bar and admitting he may have contacted the girl by telephone before her disappearance. His DNA was obtained without protest, and he later failed a polygraph test. A warrant to search a storage facility led to authorities confiscating items of interest.

Additionally, the two individuals who witnessed the kidnapper lead Mihaljevic into his vehicle identified the potential suspect's image out of photo line-ups conducted in May 2020. The vehicle itself was consistent with the suspect's known vehicle in 1989, including the fact its carpeting was similar in coloration to the fibers on Mihaljevic's body. A vehicle of the same make and model had been observed near the body's dumpsite on February 8, 1990, when the victim's body was recovered along a roadside.

== Aftermath ==
In response to her daughter's death, Mihaljevic's mother, Margaret McNulty, co-founded the Community Fund for Assisting Missing Youth, which aimed to educate children about stranger danger. McNulty died in 2001 from complications of alcoholism at the age of 54.

== See also ==
- List of solved missing person cases
