= Disappearance of Brianna Maitland =

Unsolved 2004 disappearance of 17-year-old from Vermont

Coordinates: 44.911307°N 72.659527°W

Brianna Maitland
- Portrait of Maitland
- Born: Brianna Alexandra Maitland (Note: The Charley Project erroneously reports Maitland's middle name as "Alexandria," which conflicts with official Vermont vital statistics, which list her middle name as "Alexandra."); October 8, 1986; Burlington, Vermont, U.S.
- Disappeared: March 19, 2004 (aged 17); Montgomery, Vermont, U.S.
- Status: Missing for 22 years and 7 months
- Known for: Missing person
- Height: 5 ft 5 in (1.65 m)
- Parent: Bruce Maitland: Kellie Maitland

On March 19, 2004, Brianna Alexandra Maitland, a 17‑year‑old from Montgomery, Vermont, disappeared after leaving her job at the Black Lantern Inn. The next day, her car was found backed into the side of an abandoned house about a mile from her workplace. Maitland has not been seen or heard from since, and several days passed before she was reported missing.

In the weeks that followed, state investigators pursued numerous tips, including a claim that she was being held in a house associated with local drug dealers she knew, but none led to her discovery. A reported 2006 sighting of Maitland at a casino in Atlantic City, New Jersey, generated renewed interest, though the woman seen was never identified. In 2012, investigators examined a possible link to serial killer Israel Keyes, who had been active in Vermont, but the FBI ruled him out as a suspect.

Maitland's case has been featured in local media, on Dateline NBC, and in the documentary series Disappeared. It was also discussed in a 2017 documentary about missing college student Maura Murray, who vanished a month earlier in nearby New Hampshire. Maitland's disappearance remains unsolved.

== Background ==
=== Early life ===
Brianna Maitland was born October 8, 1986, in Burlington, Vermont, to Bruce and Kellie Maitland (née Fisher). She was raised with her older brother on their parents' farm in East Franklin, Vermont, near the Canadian border. In her youth, Maitland trained extensively in jiu-jitsu. She attended Missisquoi Valley Union High School before transferring to Enosburg Falls High School in nearby Enosburg Falls during her sophomore year.

=== Prior to disappearance ===
On her seventeenth birthday in October 2003, Maitland decided she wanted to move away from her parents' farm. Her mother said there were no serious stresses at home, but that Maitland wanted more independence and to live closer to a group of friends who lived 15 miles (24 km) away and attended a different high school. Maitland enrolled at that school, but her living arrangements were unstable, and she moved in and out of several friends' homes. By the end of February 2004, she dropped out of high school and moved in with her childhood friend, Jillian Stout, in Sheldon, Vermont, about 20 miles (32 km) west of Montgomery. Maitland enrolled in a GED program to complete her education.

Three weeks before her disappearance, Maitland was attacked at a party by a former friend, Keallie Lacross. The motive was unclear, though Maitland's father later said he believed it stemmed from jealousy over Maitland's interaction with a male peer at the party. A friend at the party said Maitland, despite her martial arts training, refused to fight Lacross, who hit her several times in the face while Maitland was seated in a truck. Maitland suffered a broken nose and a concussion. She later filed charges against Lacross. The complaint was dropped three weeks after Maitland vanished, and Lacross was cleared of involvement in her disappearance.

== Disappearance ==
=== Friday, March 19, 2004 ===
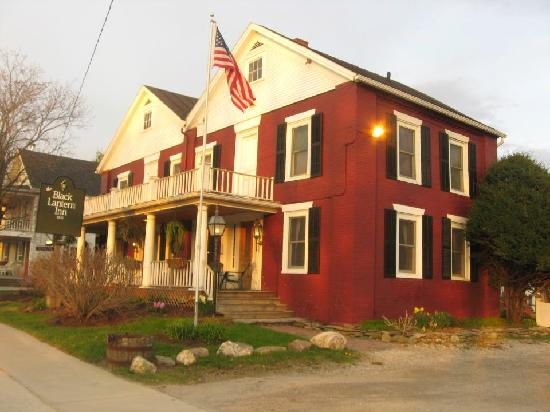
Black Lantern Inn, Maitland's workplace and the last place she was seen alive

On the morning of Friday, March 19, 2004, Maitland took an exam to receive her GED. After completing the test, she and her mother had lunch to celebrate. Her father was working out of state in New York at the time. Kellie said her daughter was in good spirits and had talked about plans to attend college.

After lunch, Maitland and Kellie spent the afternoon shopping and running errands. While they were waiting in a checkout line, something outside caught Maitland's attention. She told her mother she would return shortly and left the store. Kellie finished her purchase and met Maitland in the parking lot. She noticed that her daughter seemed unnerved, shaken, and agitated. Maitland told her she needed to go home and prepare for her work shift at the Black Lantern Inn in Montgomery. Kellie did not ask what had happened and dropped her off at Stout's home between 3:30 and 4:00 pm. This was the last time she saw her daughter. Before leaving for work, Maitland left a note for Stout saying she would return after her shift that evening. She then drove to the Black Lantern Inn in a 1985 Oldsmobile sedan registered to her mother.

After completing her shift, Maitland clocked out and left the Black Lantern Inn at about 11:20 p.m. She told co-workers she needed to get home and rest before working the next day at her second job in St. Albans. By all accounts, she was alone in her vehicle when she left.

=== Saturday, March 20, 2004 ===
==== Discovery of vehicle ====
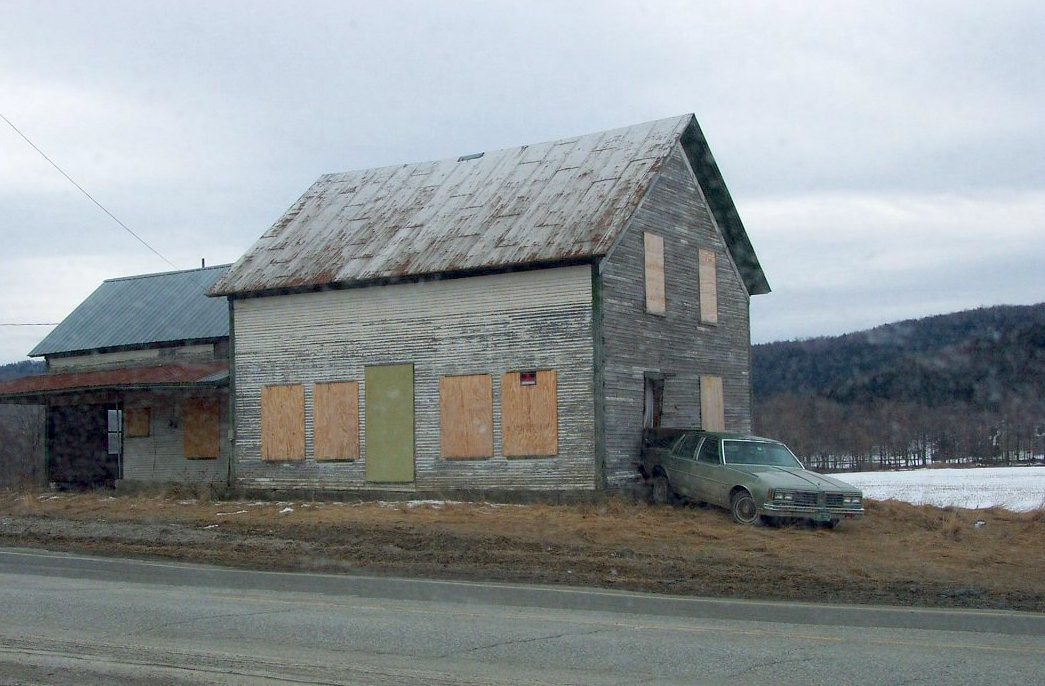
Brianna Maitland's vehicle as discovered on 20 March 2004

Early the next afternoon, on March 20, a Vermont State Police trooper was dispatched to an abandoned house on Route 118 in Richford, about a mile (1.6 km) from the Black Lantern Inn. Maitland's Oldsmobile was found backed into the side of the house. Known locally as "the old Dutchburn house," the siding had been breached by the rear end of the car. A piece of plywood that had been covering a window lay on the trunk. Two of Maitland's paychecks were on the front seat. Outside the car, law enforcement found loose change, a water bottle, and an unsmoked cigarette. The trooper assumed the vehicle had been abandoned by a drunk driver, and a towing company brought it to a local garage.

Maitland was not reported missing for several days. Kellie did not learn about the discovery of the car until five days later. Stout saw Maitland's note on Friday, March 19, spent the weekend away, and found the note undisturbed when she returned on Monday. Assuming Maitland was staying elsewhere, she did not call Kellie until the next day. On Tuesday, March 23, Kellie began calling friends and employers to find her daughter, but no one had seen or spoken to her. Still unaware that the vehicle had been recovered, she filed a missing persons report that day. On Thursday, March 25, Maitland's parents gave photos of her to the Vermont State Police in St. Albans. A trooper showed them a picture of the Oldsmobile found at the Dutchburn house, and they immediately identified it as their daughter's. Kellie later said in an interview that she was "instinctively revulsed" by the photo and believed someone else, not Maitland, had left the car in that condition.

=== Witness sightings ===
After Maitland's disappearance was reported, several people told law enforcement they had seen her vehicle at the Dutchburn house on the night she vanished:

- A man who drove by between 11:30 p.m. and 12:30 a.m. on March 19–20 said the headlights may have been on. He did not see anyone in or around the car.
- A second man who passed between midnight and 12:30 a.m. on March 20 recalled seeing a turn signal flashing.
- In 2025, private investigator Lou Barry said a couple who drove by around midnight saw a tall, stocky man standing in front of the headlights, and later a silver or grey Honda Civic speeding and braking abruptly at the scene.
- Around 4:00 a.m. on March 20, a former boyfriend of Maitland's drove past after a night of partying in Canada. He thought he recognized the vehicle but did not see anyone in or around it.
- The next morning, passing motorists found the scene unusual enough that they stopped and took pictures. One photographer reported loose change, a water bottle, and a bracelet or necklace on the ground next to the car.

== Investigation ==
=== Initial findings ===
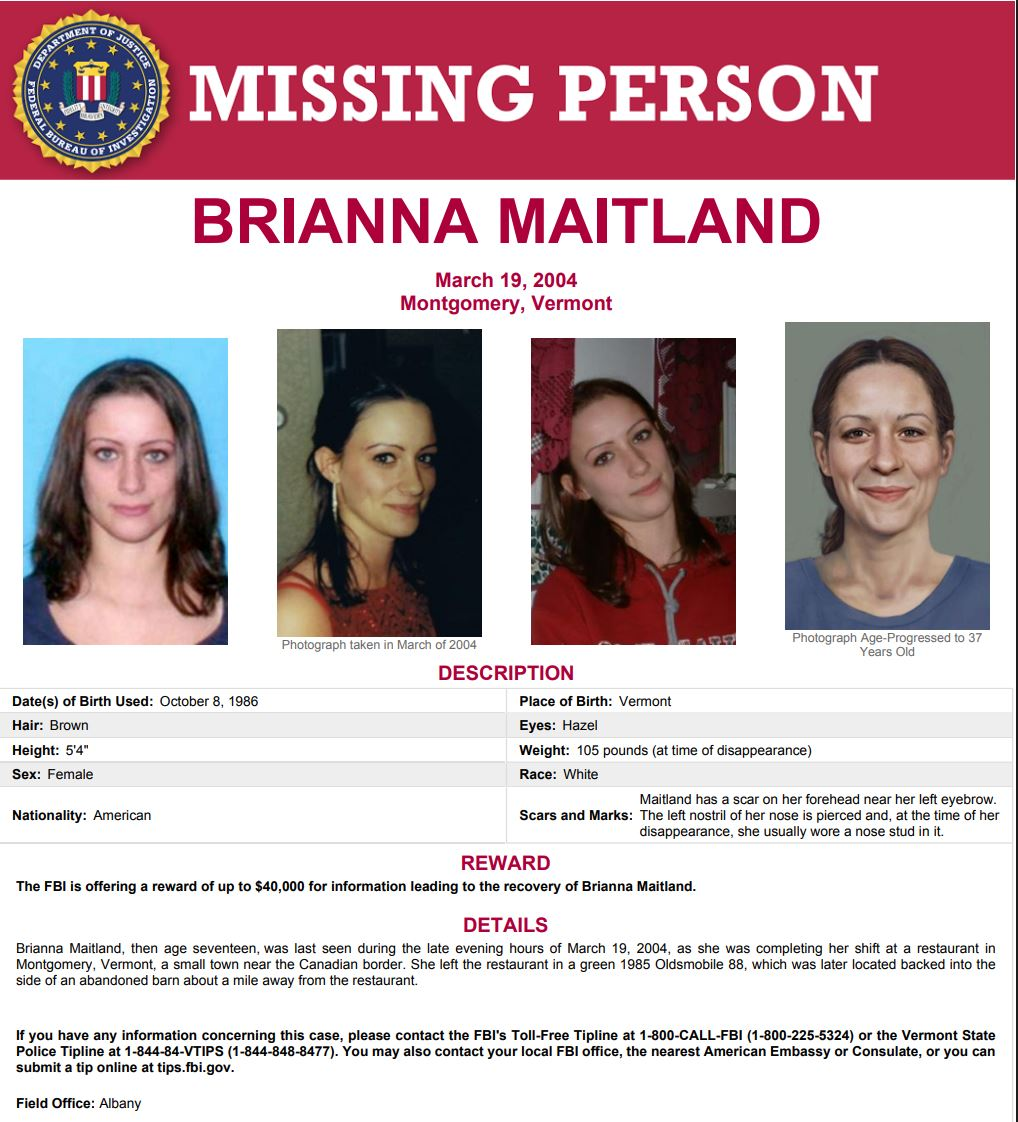
Brianna Maitland's FBI Missing Persons poster

The Vermont State Police, who led the investigation during the first months after Maitland's disappearance, were initially skeptical that foul play was involved and considered the possibility that she was a runaway. The area around the old Dutchburn house was searched on foot by police and search dogs, but nothing was found. Maitland's vehicle was processed by the state crime laboratory on March 30, 2004, after it had been impounded at a local garage for several days. When the car was returned to the Maitland family, Bruce noted that his daughter's ATM card, glasses, contact lens case, and migraine medication were still inside.

Law enforcement later concluded that foul play was the probable cause of Maitland's disappearance. A 2007 FBI flyer stated that the scene where her car was found may have been staged to appear accidental. Maitland's parents publicly speculated that she may have been abducted by multiple people, saying it would have been difficult for a single assailant to overpower her because of her jiu-jitsu training.

The disappearance of Maura Murray, a college student from Massachusetts, in northwest New Hampshire the previous month, was deemed unrelated by law enforcement, despite the two events occurring within 90 miles (140 km) of each other. In 2004, Maitland's family created a website, now defunct, titled bringbrihome.org, offering a reward of up to USD$20,000 for information leading to her whereabouts. The site remained active until at least 2009. (Note: According to records in the Internet Archive, bringbrihome.org was active until at least 2009; after this, archives of the website show empty domain notices. However, archives for the years of 2010–2013 do not exist, so it may have remained active until at least 2013.) According to a March 2017 article in the Burlington Free Press, the reward was still available. In June 2017, however, it was reported that the reward was due to expire in early July.

=== Allegations and affidavit ===
In the week after Maitland's disappearance, the Vermont State Police received an anonymous tip claiming she was being held against her will in a house in nearby Berkshire, 10 miles (16 km) from Montgomery. The rented house, occupied by Ramon L. Ryans and Nathaniel Charles Jackson, two known drug dealers from New York, was raided on April 15, 2004. Police found drug paraphernalia and substantial amounts of cocaine and marijuana, but no sign of Maitland. Ryans was arrested on drug charges. Interviews with Maitland's close friends revealed that she had allegedly experimented with hard drugs in the recent past, specifically crack cocaine, and was acquainted with Ryans and Jackson.

In late 2004, police received a signed statement from an anonymous "older female" who implicated Ryans and Jackson in Maitland's disappearance and alleged murder. The affidavit described, in graphic detail, claims that Maitland had been murdered about a week after she vanished. The woman alleged that Ryans killed Maitland during an argument over money she had lent him to buy crack, and that her body was temporarily stored in the basement of a local woman's home before being dismembered with a table saw and disposed of on a pig farm. Law enforcement was unable to corroborate the claims.

The Maitland family also reported receiving several anonymous phone calls claiming Maitland was "tied to a tree in the woods," or that she had been disposed of in a lake.

=== Later developments ===
On February 17, 2006, security footage at the Caesars Atlantic City in Atlantic City, New Jersey, showed a woman resembling Maitland sitting at a poker table. The footage was not released publicly until March 2006. Maitland would have been 19 at the time, and New Jersey state law requires casino patrons to be 21 or older. If the woman was Maitland, it is possible she had started a new life under a new identity, though this remains unknown because the woman was never identified.

In 2012, law enforcement investigated a possible connection between Maitland's disappearance and Israel Keyes, a serial killer who committed murders in Alaska, Oregon, and Washington, and in Vermont and New York, where he owned property in Constable. The FBI ruled out Keyes's involvement in late December 2012, shortly after he died by suicide in Anchorage, Alaska.

On March 19, 2016, the twelfth anniversary of Maitland's disappearance, investigators told a local television station they had recovered DNA samples from her car. The results were not released. In July 2016, the old Dutchburn house, where her vehicle had been found, was destroyed in a fire.

In March 2022, the Vermont State Police announced they had matched the DNA sample found in Maitland's car. The identity of the person was not released, but officials said it belonged to one of eleven people previously tested in connection with the case and that the individual "has been very cooperative and spoken to us."

In 2024, the FBI and Vermont State Police announced a reward of up to $40,000 for information to locate Maitland. Craig Tremaroli, special agent in charge of the FBI's Albany Field Office, said, "This reward money today is for information leading to her recovery [...] Someone out there may have information that can help solve this case. It's been too long and it's time to come forward." Matthew Birmingham of the Vermont State Police added, "This is not a cold case, it's an unsolved case."

In 2025, the Vermont State Police reported that Maitland remains missing despite an extensive, ongoing investigation. Det. Sgt. Angela Baker said the case is not "unsolvable," and "I think that we just haven’t [...] asked the right question or we haven’t asked the right person yet."

== Media depictions ==
Maitland's case has been profiled by Dateline NBC and on the Investigation Discovery documentary series Disappeared in December 2011. Maitland's disappearance was also mentioned in an episode of 20/20. In 2016, her case was profiled on the podcast The Vanished. In 2017, it was featured in an episode of the Oxygen documentary series The Disappearance of Maura Murray. In 2023, a book about her disappearance was published by a private investigator who has worked for the Maitland family.

== See also ==
- List of people who disappeared mysteriously (2000–present)
