= Lebanon hostage crisis =

Kidnapping in Lebanon of 104 foreign hostages between 1982 and 1992

- Part of the Lebanese Civil War
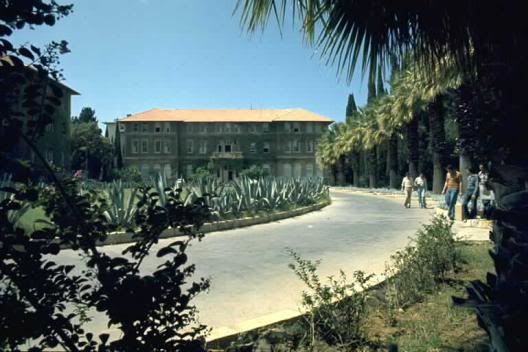
- Many of the foreign hostages were associated with the American University of Beirut, seen here in 1970
- Date: 5 June 1982 – 17 June 1992
- Location: Lebanon
- Perpetrators: Hezbollah and associated groups
- Deaths: At least 8
- Nationalities of hostages: List: Austria; France; India; Iran; Ireland; Saudi Arabia; Soviet Union; Switzerland; United Kingdom; United States; West Germany

The Lebanon hostage crisis was the kidnapping in Lebanon of 104 foreign hostages between 1982 and 1992, when the Lebanese Civil War was at its height. The hostages were mostly Americans and Western Europeans, but 21 national origins were represented. At least eight hostages died in captivity; some were murdered, while others died from lack of medical attention. During the fifteen years of the civil war, an estimated 17,000 people disappeared after being abducted.

The kidnappers used different names, but the testimony of former hostages indicates that almost all of them were kidnapped by a single group of about a dozen men affiliated with the Hezbollah organization. Particularly important in the organization was Imad Mughniyah. Hezbollah publicly denied involvement. The theocratic government of Iran played a major role in the kidnappings, and may have instigated them.

The motive for the hostage-taking was to stop the United States and others from retaliating against Hezbollah for killing 241 Americans and 58 French in the Marine barracks and embassy bombings in Beirut in 1983. The kidnappings and prolonged holding of hostages was also attributed to Iranian foreign policy interests, including a desire to extract concessions from the Western countries, the hostage takers being strong allies of Iran.

The tight security measures taken by the perpetrators prevented the rescue of all but a handful of hostages. This, along with public pressure from the media and families of the hostages, led to a breakdown of the anti-terrorism principle of "no negotiations, no concessions" by American and French officials. In the United States, the Reagan administration negotiated a secret arms-for-hostage swap with Iran known as the Iran–Contra affair.

The end of the crisis in 1992 is thought to have been precipitated by the need for Western aid and investment by Syria and Iran following the end of the Iran–Iraq War and the dissolution of the Soviet Union. Hezbollah was promised that it could remain armed following the end of the Lebanese Civil War and that France and America would not seek revenge against it.

== Background ==
The kidnapped victims consisted of 25 Americans, 16 French, 12 British, 7 Swiss, 7 West Germans and 1 Irish man. The hostage takers claimed to belong to obscure organizations such as the Islamic Jihad Organization (IJO), the Organization for the Defense of Free People (ODFP), the Oppressed of the Earth Organization (OEO), the Islamic Jihad for the Liberation of Palestine (IJLP), the Revolutionary Justice Organization (RJO), the Organization of Right against Wrong (ORAW), Followers of the Prophet Muhammad (FPM), and the Holy Strugglers for Justice (HJS).

== Hostages ==
With the exception of a few hostages such as CIA Bureau Chief William Francis Buckley and Marine Colonel William Higgins (who were both killed), most were chosen not for any political activity or alleged wrongdoing, but because of the country they came from and the ease of kidnapping. Despite this, they were physically mistreated, repeatedly beaten and subjected to mock executions.

Some of the hostages were:

- David S. Dodge. Among the first victims whose case was widely publicized was American University of Beirut president David Dodge, abducted 19 July 1982 and freed on July 21, 1983. According to Lebanese journalist Hala Jaber, "Dodge was abducted initially by pro-Palestinian Lebanese" in hopes of pressuring the Americans to pressure Israel which had invaded Lebanon to stop Lebanon-based PLO attacks. After the PLO evacuated Lebanon, Dodge was taken into Iranian custody, and moved him from Beqaa Valley to Tehran. The Iranians hoped to use Dodge to gain the release of four Iranian officials who had been kidnapped by Lebanese Christians in July 1982. The four Iranians were never found. Dodge spent the next three months in Evin Prison, and was asked for information about the kidnapped Iranians whenever he was interrogated. He was released, reportedly, because Syrian President Assad was angered by Iran's involvement in the kidnapping. Dodge was released from captivity and driven back to the airport by an official of the Iranian Revolutionary Guards. He flew to Damascus, and was handed over to the American embassy on arrival there.
- Benjamin Weir. The Presbyterian minister was kidnapped in May 1984 by three armed men while strolling with his wife. Weir may have thought he was safe from harm from Muslims because he lived in Shiite West Beirut working with Muslim charities, and had lived in Lebanon since 1958. Two days after his abduction, a telephone message claimed: "Islamic Jihad organization claims it is responsible for the abduction ... in order to renew our acceptance of Reagan's challenge [to fight "state terrorism"] and to confirm our commitment of the statement ... that we will not leave any American on Lebanese soil". He was released mid-September 1985.
- Terry A. Anderson, chief Middle East correspondent for the Associated Press, was the longest held hostage believed to be captured by Shiite Hezbollah or Islamic Jihad Organization. Anderson was seized on March 16, 1985, finally being released December 4, 1991.
- Charles Glass, an American television correspondent, was seized on June 17, 1987, by a previously unknown group, the "Organization for the Defense of Free People", believed to be one of Hezbollah's aliases. He escaped 62 days later.
- Rudolf Cordes and Alfred Schmidt, two citizens of West Germany, were abducted in January 1987 by an organization calling itself "Strugglers for Freedom". The West Germans were seized shortly after the West German government arrested Mohammed Ali Hamadi, a Shia terrorist leader who allegedly masterminded the 1985 TWA Flight 847 hijacking and killed diver Robert Dean Stethem. Mohammed Ali Hammadi was not released at that time, but was apparently exchanged in 2006 for a German hostage then held in Iraq. Schmidt was released in September 1987. Cordes was released in September 1988.
- Thomas Sutherland, former Dean of Agriculture at the American University of Beirut in Lebanon, was kidnapped by Islamic Jihad members near his Beirut home on June 9, 1985. He was released on November 18, 1991, at the same time as Terry Waite, having been held hostage for 2,353 days.

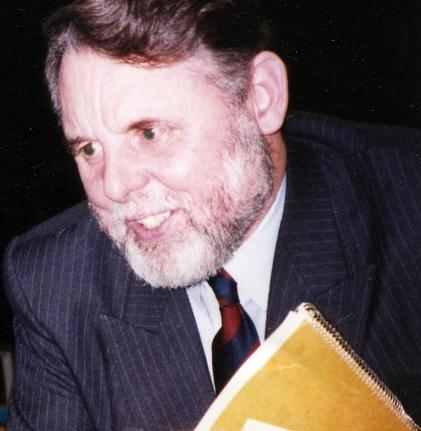
Terry Waite

- Terry Waite, an Anglican church envoy, disappeared on January 20, 1987, while on a negotiating mission to free the other kidnap victims. He spent almost five years in captivity, nearly four years of it in solitary confinement, after he was seized by Islamic Jihad from a go-between's house in Lebanon. Before his release in November 1991 he was frequently blindfolded, as well as having been beaten early in his period of imprisonment and subjected to a mock execution. He was chained, suffered desperately from asthma, and was once transported in a refrigerator as his captors moved him about.

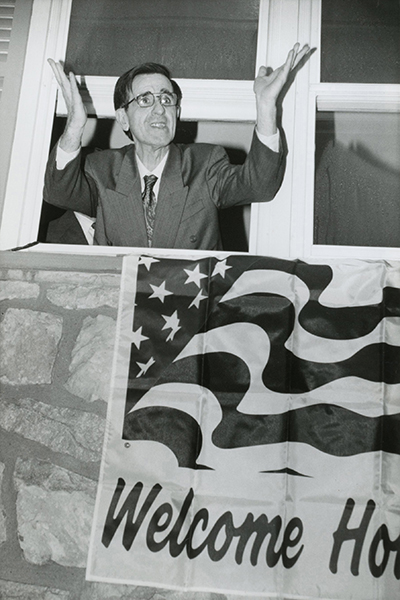
Former hostage Joseph Cicippio after his release in 1991

- Joseph J. Cicippio, who was working as the acting comptroller at the American University in Beirut when he was taken hostage on September 12, 1986. He spent 1,908 days in captivity, and released on December 2, 1991. He spent most of his time chained in a small room with one other hostage. Following his release, Cicippio was one of several that successfully sued Iran for damages as sponsoring Hezbollah under the Foreign Sovereign Immunities Act, being awarded US$30 million. His children subsequently attempted to sue Iran for emotional damages Cicippio-Puleo v. Islamic Republic of Iran (2004) but which was dismissed by the courts as the Foreign Sovereign Immunities Act did not allow for foreign nations to be subject to private cause of action lawsuits, which led to Congress making a significant changes to FSIA in 2008 to enhance terrorist exceptions in sovereign immunity and assure foreign nations were responsible for actions of their officials tied to state-sponsored terrorism.

=== Killed ===
- William Francis Buckley. Former CIA Bureau Chief, Beirut, taken hostage by Islamic Jihad, Mar 16, 1984. and held at the village of Ras al-Ain. On October 3, 1985, the Islamic Jihad Organization claimed to have killed him. The Islamic Jihad Organization later released to a Beirut newspaper a photograph purporting to depict his corpse. Press reports stated that Buckley had been transferred to Iran, where he was tortured and killed. Former American hostage David Jacobsen revealed that Buckley actually died of a heart attack brought on by torture, probably on June 3, 1985. His remains were found in a plastic sack on the side of the road to the Beirut airport in 1991.
- Alec Collett, a British employee for UNRWA, was kidnapped along with his Austrian driver on March 25, 1985. The Austrian was only briefly held then released. In a videotape released in April 1986, Collett was shown being hanged by his kidnappers. Collett's body was not found until November 2009.
- Four Soviet diplomats were kidnapped on September 30, 1985. Arkady Katkov, a consular attaché, was killed by his captors; the other three (Oleg Spirin, Valery Mirikov, and Nikolai Svirsky) were released a month later. According to a 1986 report by the Jerusalem Post, the release of the hostages occurred following the kidnapping and murder of a key Hezbollah leader by the KGB.
- Michel Seurat. On February 10, 1986, the Islamic Jihad Organization released a photograph that claimed to show the body of French sociologist Michel Seurat, who had been kidnapped earlier. On 5 March 1986 Islamic Jihad claimed it had executed Seurat. His fellow hostages revealed on their release that Seurat had died of hepatitis. His body was found in October 2005.
- Peter Kilburn, Leigh Douglas, and Philip Padfield. On April 17, 1986, the bodies of these three American University of Beirut employees, American citizen Peter Kilburn and Britons Leigh Douglas and Philip Padfield, were discovered near Beirut. The Revolutionary Organization of Socialist Muslims claimed to have executed the three men in retaliation for the United States air raid on Libya on April 15, 1986.

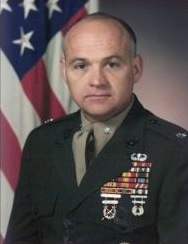
William R. Higgins, USMC

- Another American military man killed by Hezbollah abductors was Colonel William R. Higgins. He was captured February 17, 1988, and taken hostage while serving on a United Nations (UN) peacekeeping mission in southern Lebanon. A year and a half after his capture, a videotape was released by his captors showing his body hanging by the neck. On December 23, 1991, his body was recovered from a Beirut street where it had been dumped.
- A further victim was Dennis Hill, an English lecturer at the American University of Beirut, originally from Middlesex, UK. Hill, aged 53, had worked for the American University of Beirut on the Intensive English Language Program since October 1984. He was shot several times in the head on May 30, 1985, while attempting to escape from his captors, according to the Associated Press. Islamic Jihad denied responsibility for the killing which it blamed on the CIA, (along with an attempted assassination of the Emir of Kuwait and bombing in Saudi Arabia).

=== Escaped or rescued ===
- Frank Regier. An American engineering professor at the American University of Beirut. He was kidnapped on February 10, 1984, when he walked off the campus grounds. He was freed after several months in captivity by Amal militiamen, who raided the Beirut hideout of his extremist captors on April 15, 1984. Islamic Jihad responded by threatening Amal.
- Christian Joubert. A French architect working with a Lebanese construction company. He was kidnapped on February 15, 1984, in West Beirut. He was rescued on April 15, 1984, along with Frank Regier.
- Jonathan Wright. A British journalist who escaped from his captors in September 1984.
- Jeremy Levin. An American journalist and bureau chief for CNN. He was kidnapped on March 7, 1984, while walking to his office in West Beirut. On February 14, 1985, he escaped from his captors in the Beqaa Valley. Shia militants claimed they had allowed him to escape and the U.S. publicly thanked Syria for intervening on his behalf.
- Michel Brillant. A French teacher working at the French Protestant College. He was kidnapped on April 9, 1986, in Hamra and was released four days later on April 13, 1986, in the Beqaa Valley.
- Husayn Farrash. A Saudi Arabian diplomat. He was kidnapped in West Beirut on January 17, 1984. He was freed on July 16, 1986, when the Lebanese Army caught his captors.
- David Hirst. On September 26, 1986, British journalist David Hirst escaped by bolting from his captors' automobile in a Shia neighborhood of Beirut.
- Jean-Marc Sroussi several days later (from September 26, 1986) French television correspondent Jean-Marc Sroussi escaped from a locked shed days after his capture.

== Perpetrators ==
Hezbollah, sometimes described as the "umbrella group" of Shia radicalism in Lebanon, is considered by most observers to be the instigator of the crisis.

Analysis of the hostage-crisis in Lebanon yields that Hezbollah was undisputably responsible for the aforementioned abductions of Westerners despite attempts to shield its complicity through the employment of cover-names. Its organisational framework was not only sophisticated and assimilated according to Iranian clerical designs but also closely integrated with several key Iranian institutions which provided it with both necessary weaponry and training to successfully confront self-proclaimed Islamic enemies and invaluable financial support ...

Hezbollah itself, denies the charge, proclaiming in 1987:

We look with ridicule at the accusations of Hezbollah in connection with the abductions of foreign hostages. We consider that is a provocation and hold America responsible for the results.

Another source claims that with the exceptions of six Iranian hostages, all the hostages appear to have been seized by groups allied with Iran.

The two main operatives of the hostage taking were reported to be Imad Mughniyah, a senior member of the Hezbollah organization, who was described by journalist Robin Wright as the "master terrorist" behind the campaign and Husayn Al-Musawi (also spelled Hussayn al-Mussawi). The village of Ras al-Ein, in the Beqaa Valley of East Lebanon was a place were the victims were held.

== Motivations ==
According to scholar Gilles Kepel "a few of the kidnappings were money-driven or linked to local concerns, but most obeyed a logic whereby Hezbollah itself was no more than a subcontractor for Iranian initiatives". Motivation for the hostage-taking includes:

- Insurance "against retaliation by the U.S., Syria or any other force" against Hezbollah, for the killing of over 300 Americans in the Marine barracks and embassy bombings in Beirut.
- The release of four Iranian officials who had been kidnapped on July 5, 1982, by Christian militia Lebanese Forces (aka Phalangists) 25 miles north of Beirut. In December 1988, Hashemi Rafsanjani publicly addressed the Americans just before he was elected president of Iran:

If you are interested in having your people [who are] held hostage in Lebanon released, then tell the Phalangists [Christian militia] to release our people who have been in their hands for years.

The Iranians included Ahmad Motevaselian, the Ba'albek commander of the Islamic Revolutionary Guard contingent, and Mohsen Musavi, the Iranian chargé d'affaires to Lebanon. (The other two Iranians were Akhaven Kazem and Taqi Rastegar Moqaddam.)

- Pro-Palestinian Lebanese believed they could use the first American hostage, David Dodge, "as a means of pressuring the American to do something about the Israeli invasion of Lebanon".
- Lebanese Hezbollah member Imad Mughniyah wanted to free his cousin, brother-in-law Mustafa Badreddine, one of the "Kuwait 17" (the 17 imprisoned perpetrators of the 1983 Kuwait Bombing).

The hostage in captivity the longest, Terry Anderson, was told that he and the other hostages had been abducted to gain the freedom of their seventeen comrades in Kuwait convicted of perpetrating the 1983 Kuwait Bombing of six key foreign and Kuwaiti installations, "what might have been the worst terrorist attack of the century had the bombs' rigging not been faulty".

- Another of the Kuwait 17, Hussein al-Sayed Yousef al-Musawi, was the first-cousin to Husayn Al-Musawi, leader of Islamic Amal, a sister militia to Hezbollah that was later merged with Hezbollah.
- Islamist Shia wanted to use French hostages to free Anis Naccache, who had been the leader of the Iranian backed assassination team who had attempted to kill former Iranian Premier Shapour Bakhtiar. Naccache was a Christian Lebanese convert to Islam who had pledged allegiance to Khomeini following the success of the Iranian Revolution. He was a "close personal friend" of "Ahmad Khomeini, son of the Iranian revolutionary" leader, "Mohasen Rafiqust, Islamic Revolutionary Guard Corp commander in Lebanon", and of the aforementioned Hezbollah operative Imad Mughniya. They appear to have been completely successful in their efforts.

On 18 July 1980, Naccache was arrested for the attempt to kill Bakhtiar. A police officer and a bystander were killed in the subsequent battle with the police. Naccache and three others were given life sentences. ... Naccache's release later became a condition for freeing the Western hostages in Lebanon.

Naccache was freed on 27 July 1990, together with four accomplices, after being pardoned by President François Mitterrand. All five men were put on a plane bound for Tehran. The deal also brought political, military and financial benefits to Iran itself: the release of its frozen assets and desperately needed spare parts for their armaments. The French also kicked out most of the Iranian opposition leaders who had taken sanctuary in their country following the revolution." Three French hostages in Lebanon, Jean-Pierre Kaufmann, Marcel Carton et Marcel Fontaine, had been released by kidnappers on May 4, 1988. France denied reports that the release of Naccache was a repayment for the release of the three French hostages .

== Resolution ==
By 1991, radical Shia operatives imprisoned in Europe had been freed. Islamic Dawa Party members convicted of terrorism in Kuwait had been freed by the Iraqi invasion. There was no need to pressure Western supporters of Iraq because the Iran–Iraq War was over. It was pretty well established that the four missing Iranians were no longer alive.

More importantly Iran was in need of foreign investment "to repair its economy and infrastructure" after the destruction on the border areas in the Iran–Iraq War, and Syria needed "consolidation of its hegemony over Lebanon" and to obtain Western aid to compensate for the loss of Soviet support following the collapse of the Soviet Union. Syria was actively pressuring Hezbollah to stop the abductions and a February 1987 attack by Syrian troops in Beirut that harassed members of Hezbollah was in part an expression of Syrian irritation with the continued hostage-taking. Hezbollah had guarantees from Syria that despite the end of the Lebanese Civil War, it would be allowed to remain armed, while all other Lebanese militias would be disarmed, on the grounds that Hezbollah needed its weapons to fight Israeli occupation in the South.

This combination of factors created a setting whereby UN Secretary-General Javier Pérez de Cuéllar and his personal envoy, Giandomenico Picco (served on the Board of Governmental Relations for the American Iranian Council), could negotiate "a comprehensive resolution to the hostage-crisis". By December 1991, Hezbollah had released the last hostage in return for Israel's release of imprisoned Shi'ites.

== Timeline ==
=== 1982 ===
- 1982 July 5 – The first foreign hostages abducted in Beirut were four Iranians taken at a Phalangist checkpoint.
- 1982 July 19 – Abduction: First Westerner abducted is David Dodge, the acting president of the American University of Beirut (AUB) (American).
  Suggested motivation: the abduction of David Dodge came directly in response to the previous kidnapping of four employees of the Iranian Embassy in Beirut by the Israeli-backed Phalangist militia on July 5, 1982." Dodge was the most prominent American citizen in Lebanon next to the U.S. Ambassador.
  Declared abductor: Islamic Jihad Organization.
  Alleged abductor: "it seems clear that the abduction of David Dodge was initiated by the Islamic Revolutionary Guard Corps contingent in Lebanon...the operation was executed by Husayn al-Musawi's Islamic Amal".
- 1983 July 21 – Release: David Dodge

=== 1984 ===
- 1984 February 11 – Abduction: Frank Regier, engineering professor at the AUB (American) and Christian Joubert (French)
  Suggested motivation: 25 arrested in Kuwait in wake of Dec. 1983 multiple terrorist attacks. three are Lebanese Shi'ites.
- 1984 March (late) – Abduction: Jeremy Levin, Bureau chief of Cable News Network (American), and William Buckley "diplomat" actually Station chief, Central Intelligence Agency (American).
- 1984 March 27 – Sentencing: Kuwait's State Security Court sentence Elias Fouad Saab to death ... while Hussein al-Sayed Yousef al-Musawi receive life-imprisonment and Azam Khalil Ibrahim receives 15 years imprisonment.
  Hezbollah threatens to kill hostages if bombers are executed.
- 1984 April 15 – Release: Frank Regier by Amal militiamen, who raided the Beirut hideout of his captors.
- 1984 May – Abduction: Presbyterian minister Benjamin Weir (American).
  Suggested motivation: another effort to pressure Kuwait to accede to its demands of freedom or leniency for the prisoners.
  Declared abductor: "Islamic Jihad organization."
- 1984 August 29 – Abduction of British Journalist Jonathan Wright
- 1984 December 3 – Abduction: Peter Kilburn, librarian at AUB.
  Alleged abductor: "appears to have been perpetrated by Islamic Amal with close Iranian involvement." (p. 93)

=== 1985 ===
- 1985 January 3 – Abduction: Eric Wehrli, Swiss chargé d'affaires in Lebanon
- 1985 January 7 – Release: Eric Wehrli.
  Suggested motivation: "evidence suggests that Hezbollah deliberately targeted Wehrli in order to obtain the release of Hosein al-Talaat, Hezbollah member arrested at Zurich Airport on December 18, 1984, with explosives in his possession intended for an attack on the American embassy in Rome. and
- 1985 January 8 – Abduction: Lawrence Jenco, Director, Catholic Relief Services charitable organization (American).
  Declared abductor: "Islamic Jihad Organization".
- 1985 March – Abduction: Geoffrey Nash and Brian Lebick (both British).
  Suggested motivation: retaliation for March 8, 1985 unsuccessful assassination attempt on Sheikh Fadlallah.
- 1985 March/April – Release: Geoffrey Nash and Brian Lebick, two weeks after abduction.
  Suggested motivation: "seems to indicate that their abduction had been made on the mistaken assumption that they were American citizens".
- 1985 March 18 – Abduction: Terry A. Anderson, Chief Middle East correspondent, Associated Press (American)
  Suggested motivation: in retaliation for Fadlallah bombing and UNSC veto by the United States of the resolution condemning Israel's military practices in occupied southern Lebanon.
  Declared abductor: "Islamic Jihad Organization".
- 1985 March 22 – Abduction: three French embassy employees.
  Suggested motivation: "considerations more aligned with Iran's foreign policy, most notably related to Frances continued arms shipments to Iraq and outstanding financial debt to Iran ... [and] as a response to the presence of the French UNIFIL contingent in southern Lebanon and its perceived practice of failing to provide adequate protection to the local Shi'ite population".
- 1985 May 20 – Release: Husayn Farrash, Saudi Arabian consul Husayn Farrash released by captors after over a year in captivity.
- 1985 May 22 – Abduction: French journalist Jean-Paul Kaufmann and French sociologist Michel Seurat.
  Suggested motivation: part of effort to obtain the release of Anis Naccache, imprisoned in France for the attempted assassination of the Shah's former Prime Minister Shapour Bakhtiar in Paris in July 1980. and Naccache was "head of the Iranian assassination team and...close personal friend ... with both Ahmad Khomeini, son of the Iranian revolutionary" leader "and Mohasen Rafiqust, IRGC commander in Lebanon", and was a "close personal" friend of Imad Mughniya.
- 1985 May – Abduction: Americans David Jacobsen, American University of Beirut hospital administrator.
- 1985 June – Thomas Sutherland, agronomist
  Suggested motivation: "Hezbollah focused its efforts on the release of 766 mainly Lebanese Shi'ites transferred to Israel in conjunction with it withdrawal from Lebanon, through the abduction of mainly American citizens. This was revealed most clearly by the
  Declared abductor: "Islamic Jihad Organization".
- 1985 June 14 – Hijacking and abduction: TWA flight 847. Done immediately following the completion of Israel's departure from Lebanon. The flight from Athens to Rome was hijacked by "Organization for the Oppressed of the Earth." Passengers underwent a three-day, 8,300-mile (13,400 km) ordeal shuttling back and forth between Beirut and Algiers. Groups of passengers were freed over the course of event. One passenger, a U.S. Navy diver, Robert Dean Stethem, was beaten, shot and his body dumped on the runway. Another 39 passengers were held hostage in South Beirut for two weeks, as Lebanese army troops withdrew from the Beirut airport on June 16 leaving Hezbollah and Amal militias to control the area and hold the hostages. On June 30, they were driven to Syria and released. The liberation of the hostages was followed over the next several weeks by the release of 735 Lebanese Shiite militants by Israel. Although this was one of the key demands of the hijackers, Israel maintained the release was unconnected to the hijacking.
  Suggested motivation: release of 766 mainly Lebanese Shi'ites transferred to Israel in conjunction with its withdrawal from Lebanon
- 1985 August – clandestine policy of providing armaments to Iran via Israel (aka Iran–Contra affair) initiated by U.S. government.
- 1985 mid-September – Release: Reverend Benjamin Weir, held hostage since May 1984 is freed by the "Islamic Jihad Organization".
- 1985 September 30 – Abduction: four Soviet diplomats.
  Declared abductor: "Islamic Liberation Organization".
- 1985 October -- Release of Soviet prisoners after threat of bodily harm of one of the abudctors' family members.

=== 1986 ===
- 1986 March 3 – Abduction: Marcel Coudry and a French four-man Antenne-2 television crew.
  Suggested direct motivation: retaliation for decision by France to expel two exiled members of al Dawa al-Islamiyya [Fawzy Harmza and Hassan Kheir al-Din] to Iraq.
  Other possible motivations: "Iraq owed $7 billion to France and absorbed almost 40% of all French arms export. Between 1977 and 1985, France sold more than $11.8 billion of high-technology weaponry to Iraq, including 113 Mirage F1 fighter aircraft and 3/4 of French total exports of Exocet missiles. At the same time, Iran was particularly angered over the refusal by the French government to pay between $1–1.5 billion owed from the days of the Shah and supply Iran with military-related equipment". [source ftnt43: For Iranian claims, see: and
  Declared abductor: "Revolutionary Justice Organisation".)
- 1986 April – Abduction: British citizens Brian Keenan (April 11) and John McCarthy (April 17th)
  Motivation: reprisal for the American raid on Libya.
  Suggested motivation for keeping them: demands for the release by Israel of 260 Shiites held in Al-Khiam prison in South Lebanon and the release of the three Iranian hostages taken in 1982.
- 1986 April 17 – Killed: Bodies of three American University of Beirut employees, Britons Leigh Douglas and Philip Padfield and American Peter Kilburn, discovered near Beirut.
  Declared motivation: The "Revolutionary Organization of Socialist Muslims" claims to have "executed" the three men in retaliation for the United States air raid on Libya on April 15, 1986.
- 1986 May 7 – Abduction: Camilli Sontag Frenchman in Lebanon (accompanied by "the initiation of an armed campaign against the French UNIFIL contingent in southern Lebanon.")
  Alleged motivation: "Iranian demands for the withdrawal of UNIFIL and abrogation of UNSCR 425".
- 1986 June – Release: two French hostages in June 1986.
- 1986 July 26 – Release: Lawrence Jenco.
- 1986 September 9, – Abduction: Frank Reed, Director, Lebanese International School (American)
- 1986 September 12 – Abduction: Joseph Cicippio, Acting controller, American University of Beirut (American)
- 1986 October 21 – Abduction: Edward Tracy, Writer (American)
  Alleged motivation: "replace American hostages released by the arms-for-hostages deals of the so-called Iran-Contra Affair", and undermine the arms-for-hostages deal
- 1986 November 2 – Release: David Jacobsen after more than a year and a half in captivity.
- 1986 November 3 – Revelation: Iran–Contra arms-for-hostage deal with Iran by Lebanese newspaper, Al-Shiraa, which reports that the United States sold arms to Iran.
- 1986 November – Release: three more French hostages.
  Alleged motivation: the release by France of $330 million of the $1 billion loan to Iran

=== 1987 ===
- 1987 January – Abduction: Unprecedented number of abductions of foreigners by the Hezbollah organisation. (p. 99)
  Declared motivation: "The hostages will perish in case of any military attempts against Muslims in the area and especially in Lebanon". (U.S. Navy warships in Mediterranean reportedly moving towards Lebanon.)
  Alleged motivation: "directly in response to the arrest of three leading Hezbollah member in Europe".
  Another alleged motivation: "clerical factionalism in Iran" in the aftermath of the Iran–Contra deal.
  Still another alleged motivation: Demand for the return of 400 Shi'ite and Palestinians imprisoned in Israel.
- 1987 January 24 – Abducted: Three American and one Indian Professors from Beirut University College in West Beirut: Alann Steen, Jesse Turner, Robert Polhill, Mithal Eshwar Singh
  Declared abductor: "Islamic Jihad for the Liberation of Palestine".
- 1987 January – Abduction: West German citizens Rudolf Cordes and Alfred Schmidt.
  Alleged motivation: retaliation for "the arrest of Mohammad Ali Hamadi in Frankfurt by West German authorities".
- 1987 January 13 – Abduction: Frenchman Roger Auque.
  Alleged motivation: Appears to have been "related to the previous day's arrest of Bashir Al-Khodour in Milan by Italian authorities",
- 1987 January 20 – Abduction: Terry Waite. Waite, Anglican mediator negotiating independently to free captive Westerners, disappears January 20 on his fifth mission to Lebanon.
  Alleged motivation: "mainly a consequence of his inability to affect the fate of the imprisoned 17 al-Dawa prisoners in Kuwait".
- 1987 June 17 – Abduction: Charles Glass, American television correspondent.
  Declared abductor: previously unknown group, the "Organization for the Defense of Free People".
- 1987 August 19 – Escape: Charles Glass escapes from his Hezballah captors in Beirut's southern suburbs and makes his way to the Summerland Hotel, where he calls friends to come to his assistance. The full story of his kidnapping is told in the final chapters of his book Tribes with Flags.

=== 1988 ===
- 1988, February 17 – Abduction: Lt. Col William Higgins, American Chief of the UN Truce and Supervision Organisation's observer group in Lebanon (UNTSO)
  Suggested motivation: Stop UNIFIL from interfering in Hezbollah's armed attacks against the Israeli occupation of the south.
  Suggested motivation: Show solidarity with the revival of Islamic fundamentalism within the Palestinian intifada

=== 1989 ===
- 1989 Mid – Killing: Video of U.S. Marine Lt. Col William Higgins, American Chief of the UNTSO being hanged distributed to press. Declared dead on July 6, 1990.
  Alleged motivation: challenge to Amal militia's authority to maintain a stable security environment in southern Lebanon, Amal being the leading militia there.
  Alleged motivation: to sabotage the rapprochement between Syria and the American administration
  Further alleged motivation: retaliation for kidnapping of Sheikh Obeid, senior Hezbollah cleric and regional military commander of the Islamic Resistance, by elite Israeli military units on July 28, 1989
  Another motivation: to help "Iranian radicals, most notably Mohtashemi", derail attempts to improve the U.S.-Iranian relationship.
- 1989 May – Abduction: British citizen Jackie Mann
  Declared abductor: previously unknown group, the "Cells for Armed Struggle"
  Suggested motivations are that he was kidnapped to demand the release of Palestinian prisoners that the kidnappers claimed were being held in Britain, accused of killing Palestinian cartoonist Naji al-Ali in 1987 or in retaliation against the UK government for providing Salman Rushdie with refuge and protection after Iran's Ayatollah Khomeini's fatwa death threat against Rushdie for the publication of book the Satanic Verses.
- 1989, October 6 – Abduction: Swiss citizens Emanuel Christen and Elio Erriquez

=== 1990 ===
- 1990 April 22 – Release: Robert Polhill.
- 1990 April 30 – Release: Frank Reed.
- 1990 August 24 – Release: Brian Keenan, Irish teacher of English

=== 1991 ===
- 1991 August 8 – Release: John McCarthy – the longest held British hostage in Lebanon, having spent over five years in captivity
- 1991 August 11 – Release: Edward Tracy, after almost five years in captivity.
- 1991 October–December – Release: Jesse J. Turner, Joseph J. Cicippio, Thomas Sutherland, Alann Steen, Terry Waite.
- 1991 December 4 – Release: last American hostage Terry Anderson.
  Suggested motivation: Part of Hezbollah "volteface", and entering into a new era where it participates in Lebanese democratic process while continuing its fight against Israel.
- 1991 December (late) – Return: bodies of William Buckley and Lt. Col. William Higgins found dumped on Beirut streets.

=== 1992 ===
- June 17, 1992 – Two German relief workers held since 1989, Thomas Kemptner and Heinrich Struebig, are released. They were the last Western hostages in Lebanon.

== Popular culture ==
- Hostages, a 1992 HBO film based on the event, starring Colin Firth as John McCarthy
- Hostage (1999): three part UK documentary series for Channel Four, featuring interviews with Anderson, Keenan, McCarthy, Waite, Kauffmann, and with the politicians involved, including George Shultz and Oliver North.
- An Evil Cradling, Brian Keenan's memoir of his ordeal
- Blind Flight, a 2003 UK film focusing on McCarthy and Keenan
- Someone Who'll Watch Over Me, a play by Irish dramatist Frank McGuinness about an American, an Irishman and an Englishman held as hostages in Lebanon
- American Top 40, during the show for the week ending June 21, 1986, then-hostage David Jacobsen was mentioned in a Long Distance Dedication letter from his daughter Diane. She dedicated to him "The Long and Winding Road" by the Beatles.
- Out of Life, a film directed by Lebanese filmmaker Maroun Baghdadi. Inspired by d'Un otage à Beyrouth, based on the events surrounding hostage Roger Auque, Special Jury Prize at Cannes in 1991
- Two Rooms, a play by Lee Blessing depicts an American teacher held hostage in a dark room after being captured in Beirut. His wife holds a vigil for him in an empty room, in their house outside D.C. Originally commissioned and produced in 1988, Two Rooms was named Best Play of the Year by Time magazine.
- The Bachar Tapes, an experimental documentary produced in 2000 by media artist Walid Raad as a part of the fictional Atlas Group. The video serves a testimonial for Souheil Bachar, who addresses the cultural, textual, and sexual aspects of his detention with four American men: Terry A. Anderson, Thomas Sutherland, Benjamin Weir, Marting Jenco, and David Jacobsen.

== See also ==
- List of extrajudicial killings and political violence in Lebanon
- Front for the Liberation of Lebanon from Foreigners
- 1983 Beirut barracks bombing
- 2011 Estonian cyclists abduction
- Foreign hostages in Afghanistan
- Foreign hostages in Iraq
- Iran hostage crisis
