= Hostages (1992 film) =

- Written by: Bernard MacLaverty
- Directed by: David Wheatley
- Starring: Kathy Bates; Colin Firth; Ciarán Hinds; Natasha Richardson; Jay O. Sanders; Josef Sommer; Harry Dean Stanton
- Composer: Richard Harvey
- Countries of origin: United States; United Kingdom
- Original language: English

Production
- Producer: Sita Williams
- Cinematography: John Hooper
- Editor: Anthony Ham
- Running time: 96 minutes
- Production companies: Granada Film Productions; HBO Showcase

Original release
- Network: ITV; HBO
- Release: September 23, 1992

Hostages is a 1992 American drama film directed by David Wheatley and written by Bernard MacLaverty. The film stars Kathy Bates, Colin Firth, Ciarán Hinds, Natasha Richardson, Jay O. Sanders, Josef Sommer and Harry Dean Stanton. The film premiered in the United Kingdom on ITV on September 23, 1992, and in the United States on HBO on February 20, 1993.

== Plot ==
This film is a dramatization of the Beirut hostage crisis. After several real-life news clips highlight the situation in Beirut, including footage of bombings and attacks in the Lebanese capital along with the hijacking of TWA flight 847, the film opens with reporter John McCarthy finishing a story on Brian Keenan, an Irish lecturer who was kidnapped in Beirut days earlier. The following day, en route to Beirut Airport, McCarthy's car is surrounded and when identified as a British national, he is thrown back into the car which is commandeered by the kidnappers. He is brought to an apartment before being handed off to a group of men, who strip, blindfold and lock him in a closet.

At home, his girlfriend, journalist Jill Morrell, seeks guidance from her local officials, who advise there will be no negotiations to secure his release, as officials feel conceding to the terrorists will only encourage more abductions. Two sisters of Brian Keenan are similarly seeking help from their local government in Belfast with similar response and inaction. McCarthy is later moved to another building, into the same room as Brian Keenan. The two develop a friendship as they, like the other hostages, were forced to endure unbearable conditions, including beatings at the hands of their captors, poor food, lack of sunlight, and dirty, bug-infested cells.

Some time later, as Syria invades Beirut, McCarthy and Keenan are mummy-wrapped in duct tape and moved in the underside of a pick up truck to another location where American hostages Terry Anderson, Thomas Sutherland and Frank Reed are being held. The five hostages remain together, chained to the walls and must remain blindfolded whenever their captors enter their cell. Anderson's sister, Peggy Say, is working with American officials to seek information on her brother and the other hostages. She, Morrell and the Keenan sisters seek opportunities to publicize the plight of the hostages in local news to bring more attention to the dire situation.

Following the mistaken shoot down of an Iranian airliner, the hostages are duct taped and moved back to Beirut. McCarthy, Keenan and Reed are confined in one cell together, while Anderson and Sutherland are in another. Reed is released after some time, and later Keenan is released. At first, Keenan thinks his release is a trick, as he had been told nearly a dozen times prior that his release was imminent and was cancelled at the last minute. McCarthy is then moved to the cell where Anderson and Sutherland are being held. They are soon allowed visits from another hostage, Terry Waite, who up until that time, spent several years in captivity in complete isolation. He begins visiting them on a regular basis and during one such visit, McCarthy is tapped on the shoulder and taken to another room where he is told he will be released. His captors also state the release of the other hostages is imminent.

Jill is phoned with the news of John's release, and Keenan is told by a relative of McCarthy's release after hearing on the local news. McCarthy arrives in the United Kingdom with Jill and Keenan at the airport. The film concludes with the release of Anderson, Reed, Sutherland and Waite with a narrative being spoken over the final scenes by Keenan.

== Cast ==
- Kathy Bates as Peggy Say
- Colin Firth as John McCarthy
- Ciarán Hinds as Brian Keenan
- Natasha Richardson as Jill Morrell
- Jay O. Sanders as Terry A. Anderson
- Josef Sommer as Tom Sutherland
- Harry Dean Stanton as Frank Reed
- Rasan Abbas as Head Kidnapper
- Conrad Asquith as Terry Waite
- Colin Bruce as Robie Burke
- Colum Convey as Art Agnew
- Stephen Dillane as Chris Pearson
- Harry Ditson as David Say
- Tony Doyle as Badraig Murphy
- Amir M. Korangy as Ghassemmi
- Rosaleen Linehan as Brenda Gilham
- Ruth McCabe as Elaine Spence
- Brian McGrath as Connor
- Juliano Mer-Khamis as Ali
- Patrick Pearson as Lowther
- John Pickles as Pat McCarthy
- Raad Rawi as Moussavlan
- Sami Samir as Ahmad
- Rolf Saxon as Plaskett
- Colin Stinton as Mike Mulholland
- Dan Turgeman as Mahmoud
