= Jay O. Sanders =

American actor (born 1953)

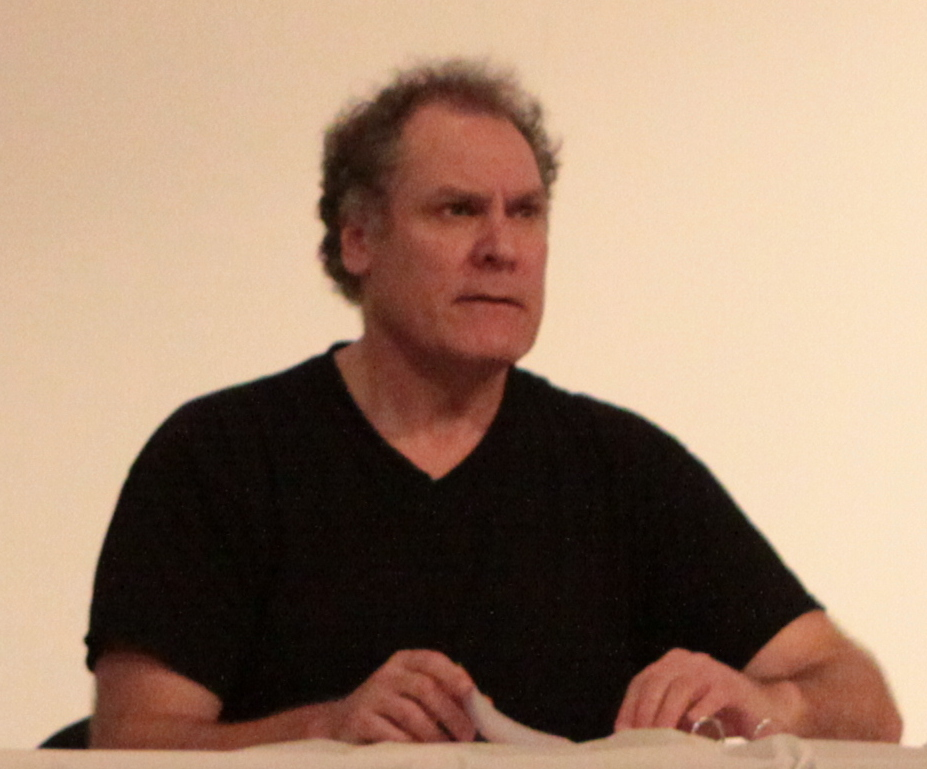
- Sanders in 2008
- Born: Jay Olcutt Sanders; April 16, 1953 (age 73); Austin, Texas, U.S.
- Education: State University of New York, Purchase (BFA)
- Occupation: Actor
- Years active: 1979–present
- Spouse: Maryann Plunkett (m. 1991)
- Children: 1

Jay Olcutt Sanders (born April 16, 1953) is an American film, theatre and television actor and playwright. He frequently appears in plays off-Broadway at The Public Theater. He has received a Drama Desk Award and a New York Drama Critics' Circle Award.

Sanders made his off-Broadway debut in a Shakespeare in the Park production of Henry V in 1976. He originated the role of Bradley in Sam Shepard's Buried Child (1978). He made his Broadway debut in the play Loose Ends (1979). He returned to Broadway in The Caine Mutiny Court-Martial (1983), Saint Joan (1993), Pygmalion (2007), Girl from the North Country (2020), and Purlie Victorious (2023).

He made his feature film debut in the comedy Starting Over (1979). He had notable roles in films such as Cross Creek (1983), Tucker: The Man and His Dream (1988), Glory (1989), JFK (1991), Hostages (1992), Angels in the Outfield (1994), Music of the Heart (1999), Tumbleweeds (1999), and Revolutionary Road (2008). He took recurring roles in television series including Roseanne, Law & Order: Criminal Intent, The Good Wife, Person of Interest, Blindspot, and Sneaky Pete. He has served as the narrator for the shows Wide Angle, Nova, and Secrets of the Dead.

== Early life and education ==
Sanders was born on April 16, 1953 in Austin, Texas to James Olcutt Sanders, an arts organization executive and violinist (1917-1983), and Phyllis Rae née Aden. His parents were Quakers. He attended the acting conservatory at SUNY Purchase.

== Career ==
Sanders made his off-Broadway debut in a Shakespeare in the Park production of Henry V in 1976. He played Bradley in the first New York production of Sam Shepard's Buried Child in 1978.

Sanders has had a long career in film and television. He is perhaps most recognized for his work in the films The Day After Tomorrow (2004), Green Lantern (2011), and the Alex Cross films starring Morgan Freeman. He has appeared in many other notable films, including Glory (1989), Mr. Destiny (1990), JFK (1991), Angels in the Outfield (1994), The Big Green (1995), Daylight, Tumbleweeds (1999), Music of the Heart (1999), Half Nelson (2006), Cadillac Records (2008), and Revolutionary Road (2008). On television, Sanders played mob lawyer Steven Kordo in the 1986–88 NBC detective series Crime Story, Norbert "Ziggy" Walsh on two episodes of Roseanne, and recurring characters on shows such as Person of Interest and True Detective. He is the narrator for the PBS series Wide Angle from 2002 to 2009, and has served as narrator for a number of Nova episodes starting in 2007.

On stage, Sanders has appeared on Broadway in Loose Ends (1979), The Caine Mutiny Court-Martial (1983), Saint Joan (1993), Pygmalion (2007), Girl from the North Country (2020), and Purlie Victorious (2023). Off-Broadway, he appeared as George W. Bush in Sir David Hare's Stuff Happens in 2006. He played in a number of Shakespearean plays: A Midsummer Night's Dream (Bottom, 2007), Hamlet (Ghost of Hamlet's Father/Player King/Gravedigger, 2008), Twelfth Night (as Sir Toby Belch, 2009), and the title role in Shakespeare's Titus Andronicus (2011).

Sanders appeared in the Apple Family Plays, a series of plays written by Richard Nelson which ran off-Broadway at The Public Theater in 2010 (That Hopey Changey Thing), 2011 (Sweet and Sad), 2012 (Sorry), and 2013 (Regular Singing). Sanders has appeared in more plays at the Delacorte Theatre (Shakespeare in Central Park) than any other actor to date. His first play, Unexplored Interior, about the Rwandan genocide debuted in November 2015 at the Atlas Performing Arts Center in Washington D.C. He had been working on it for more than a decade.

== Acting credits ==
=== Film ===
Year	Title	Role	Notes
1979	Starting Over	Larry	Credited as Jay Sanders
1982	Hanky Panky	Katz	
1983	Cross Creek	Charles Rawlings	
1983	Eddie Macon's Run	Rudy Potts	
1987	The Misfit Brigade	Lance Corporal Wolfgang "Tiny" Creutzfeldt	
1988	Tucker: The Man and His Dream	Kirby, Tucker's Attorney	
1988	The Prince of Pennsylvania	Trooper Joe	
1989	Glory	General George Crockett Strong	
1989	The Young Riders	Longley	
1990	Mr. Destiny	Jackie Earle "Cement Head" Bumpers	
1991	JFK	Lou Ivon	
1991	Meeting Venus	Stephen Taylor	
1991	V.I. Warshawski	Murray Ryerson	
1992	Hostages	Terry A. Anderson	
1993	My Boyfriend's Back	Sheriff McCloud	
1994	Angels in the Outfield	Ranch Wilder / P.A. Announcer (Voice)	
1994	State of Emergency	Dr. Jeffrey Forrest	
1995	The Big Green	Coach Jay Huffer	
1995	Kiss of Death	Federal Agent	Uncredited
1995	Silver Strand	Lucas Hughes	
1995	Three Wishes	Coach Schramka	
1996	Daylight	Steven Crighton	
1997	For Richer or Poorer	Samuel Yoder	
1997	The Matchmaker	Senator John McGlory	
1997	Kiss the Girls	FBI Agent Kyle Craig	
1998	The Odd Couple II	Leroy	
1999	Music of the Heart	Dan Paxton	
1999	The Confession	Jack Renoble	
1999	Tumbleweeds	Dan Miller	
2001	Along Came a Spider	FBI Agent Kyle Craig	
2001	The Familiar Stranger	Patrick Hennessy Welsh; Timothy Michael Kingsbury	
2003	Abby Singer	Kevin's Father	
2004	The Day After Tomorrow	Frank Harris	
2004	Hair High	Football Announcer (voice)	
2006	Half Nelson	Russ Dunne	
2006	Wedding Daze	Police Officer	
2007	Greetings from the Shore	Commodore Callaghan	
2007	Judgment Day: Intelligent Design on Trial	The Narrator	Documentary film
2008	Revolutionary Road	Bart Pollock	
2008	Cadillac Records	Mr. Feder	
2008	Poundcake	Cliff	
2009	I Hate Valentine's Day	Tim, The Delivery Guy	
2010	Edge of Darkness	Detective Bill Whitehouse	
2010	Zenith	Doug Oberts	
2011	Green Lantern	Carl Ferris	
2011	The Jewel	Mr. Rothman	
2011	The Undying	Dr. Richard Lassiter	
2011	A Novel Romance	Walter Evans	
2013	Northern Borders	Agent Sanders	
2013	Bones of the Buddha	The Narrator	Documentary film
2017	Search for the Super Battery	The Narrator	Documentary film
2019	The Assistant	Boss (voice)	
2019	DC Noir	Sgt. Peters	
2022	When You Finish Saving the World	Roger Katz	
2022	Bardo, False Chronicle of a Handful of Truths	Ambassador Jones	
2023	His Three Daughters	Vincent "Vinny"	
2026	Remain	Reece	

=== Television ===
Year	Title	Role	Notes
1980	The Day Christ Died	Simon Peter	Television film
1983	Living Proof: The Hank Williams, Jr. Story	Dick Willey	Television film
1983–1984	AfterMASH	Dr. Gene Pfeiffer	10 episodes
1985	Miami Vice	Detective Tim Duryea	Episode: "The Maze"
1986–1988	Crime Story	Steven Kordo	12 episodes
1989	Booker	Gordon Rudd	Episode: "All You Gotta Do Is Do It"
1989	Kate & Allie	Tim Mayer	Episode: "What's Love Got to Do with It?"
1989	A Man Called Hawk		
1990	L.A. Law	Detective Michael Phillips	Episode: "Watts a Matter?"
1990–1991	Roseanne	Norbert "Ziggy" Walsh	2 episodes
1993	Northern Exposure	Dr. John Summers	Episode: "Jaws of Life"
1995	Down Came a Blackbird	Jan Talbeck	Television film
1995	The Outer Limits	Ed Barkley	Episode: "The Voyage Home"
1999	Earthly Possessions	Jack Emery	Television film
1999	A.T.F.	Sam Sinclair	Television film
1999	The Jack Bull	Attorney General Metcalfe	Television film
1999	Law & Order	Nick Taska / Bill Fallon	Episode: "Tabula Rasa"
2000	Picnic	Unknown	Television film
2001	Boss of Bosses	Joseph O'Brien	Television film
2002	Law & Order: Criminal Intent	Harry Rowan	Episode: "Dead"
2002	Widows	Detective John Maynard	4 episodes
2002–2009	Wide Angle	The Narrator	63 episodes
2003	D.C. Sniper: 23 Days of Fear	Douglas Duncan	Television film
2006	The Valley of Light	Howard	Television film
2006–present	Nova	The Narrator	70 episodes
2010	Hardcover Mysteries	The Narrator	8 episodes
2011	Law & Order: Criminal Intent	Captain Joseph Hannah	Main role; 8 episodes
2011–2012	Pan Am	Douglas Vanderway	3 episodes
2011–2016	The Good Wife	Judge Hal Ferris	2 episodes
2012	Blue Bloods	Jimmy Reagan	Episode: "Reagan V. Reagan"
2012–2014	Person of Interest	Special Counsel	9 episodes
2012–present	Secrets of the Dead	The Narrator	24 episodes
2013	Hostages	Lynn Shipley	Episode: "The Cost of Living"
2014	True Detective	Billy Lee Tuttle	2 episodes
2015	Dawn of Humanity	The Narrator	1 episode
2015	American Odyssey	Alex	8 episodes
2015–2020	Blindspot	Bill Weller	11 episodes
2017–2019	Sneaky Pete	Sam	15 episodes
2018	The Sinner	Chief Tom Lidell	7 episodes
2018	Chicago Med	Reverend Cray	Episode: "Down by Law"
2020	Manhunt: Deadly Games	Jack Bryant	6 episodes

=== Theatre ===
Year	Title	Role	Venue	Ref.
1976	Henry V	Earl of Westmoreland	Shakespeare in the Park	
1976	Measure for Measure	Barnardine	Shakespeare in the Park	
1978	Buried Child	Bradley	Theater for the New City	
1979	Loose Ends	Doug	Circle in the Square Theatre, Broadway	
1983	The Caine Mutiny Court-Martial	Lt. Stephen Maryk	Circle in the Square, Broadway	
1993	Saint Joan	Dunois	Lyceum Theatre, Broadway	
2007	Pygmalion	Alfred Doolittle	American Airlines Theatre, Broadway	
2020–2022	Girl from the North Country	Nick Laine	Belasco Theatre, Broadway	
2023	Primary Trust	Clay	Laura Pels Theatre, Off-Broadway	
2023	Purlie Victorious	Ol' Captain Cotchipee	Music Box Theatre, Broadway	
2025	Henry IV	Sir John Falstaff	Theatre for a New Audience, Off-Broadway	
2025	This World of Tomorrow	Max and others	The Shed, Off-Broadway	
2026	Are You Now or Have You Ever Been	Lionel Stander (June 2–21)	New York City Center Stage I, Off-Broadway	

=== Video games ===
Year	Title	Role	Notes
2007	Manhunt 2	The Pervs	
2010	Red Dead Redemption	D.S. MacKenna, Mr. Philmore	
2010	Red Dead Redemption: Undead Nightmare	D.S. MacKenna	Uncredited

== Personal life ==
Sanders married Maryann Plunkett in 1991. They met while acting on the television series A Man Called Hawk. They have a son, Jamie.

== Awards and honors ==
He received the 2018 Joe A. Callaway Award, presented by the Actors’ Equity Foundation for "best performance in a professional production of a classic play", for his performance in Chekhov's Uncle Vanya. He also received the Drama Desk Award for 2019 for Actor in a Play for Uncle Vanya. In 2024, he received an Outer Critics Circle Award for Outstanding Featured Performer in an Off-Broadway Play for his performance in Primary Trust.
