= Some Other Rainbow =

- Author: John McCarthy; Jill Morrell
- Language: English
- Subject: McCarthy's 5 years as a hostage in Lebanon, Morrell's attempts to secure his release
- Published: 1993
- Publisher: Bantam Press

Some Other Rainbow is a joint memoir written by John McCarthy and Jill Morrell and first published by Bantam Press in 1993. It deals in separate chapters with the individual and parallel experiences of McCarthy and Morrell, during McCarthy's captivity in the Lebanon, which lasted from 17 April 1986 until 8 August 1991.

While McCarthy was held by Hezbollah, along with Irish hostage Brian Keenan, he was unaware of the campaign being run by Morrell to keep his name in the public eye and help secure his release. It was only after his release that McCarthy discovered that Morrell had formed "Friends of John McCarthy". Some Other Rainbow is often compared with Keenan's memoir, An Evil Cradling, published a year earlier.

The book topped the Independent on Sunday's bestseller list for autobiography and made the couple enough to live on for a time. The couple split up in 1995. McCarthy later wrote another memoir, A Ghost Upon Your Path (2002), dealing with later experiences.

The book's title references the Van Morrison song, Wonderful Remark. On 14 February 1994 when Van Morrison was awarded the BRIT Award for his outstanding contribution to British music, McCarthy testified to the importance of "Wonderful Remark" which he called "a song written more than 20 years ago that was very important to us."

Clinging to some other rainbow
While we're standing, waiting in the cold
Telling us the same old story
Knowing time is growing old.
