= Lawrence Jenco =

American Catholic priest and hostage (1934–1996)

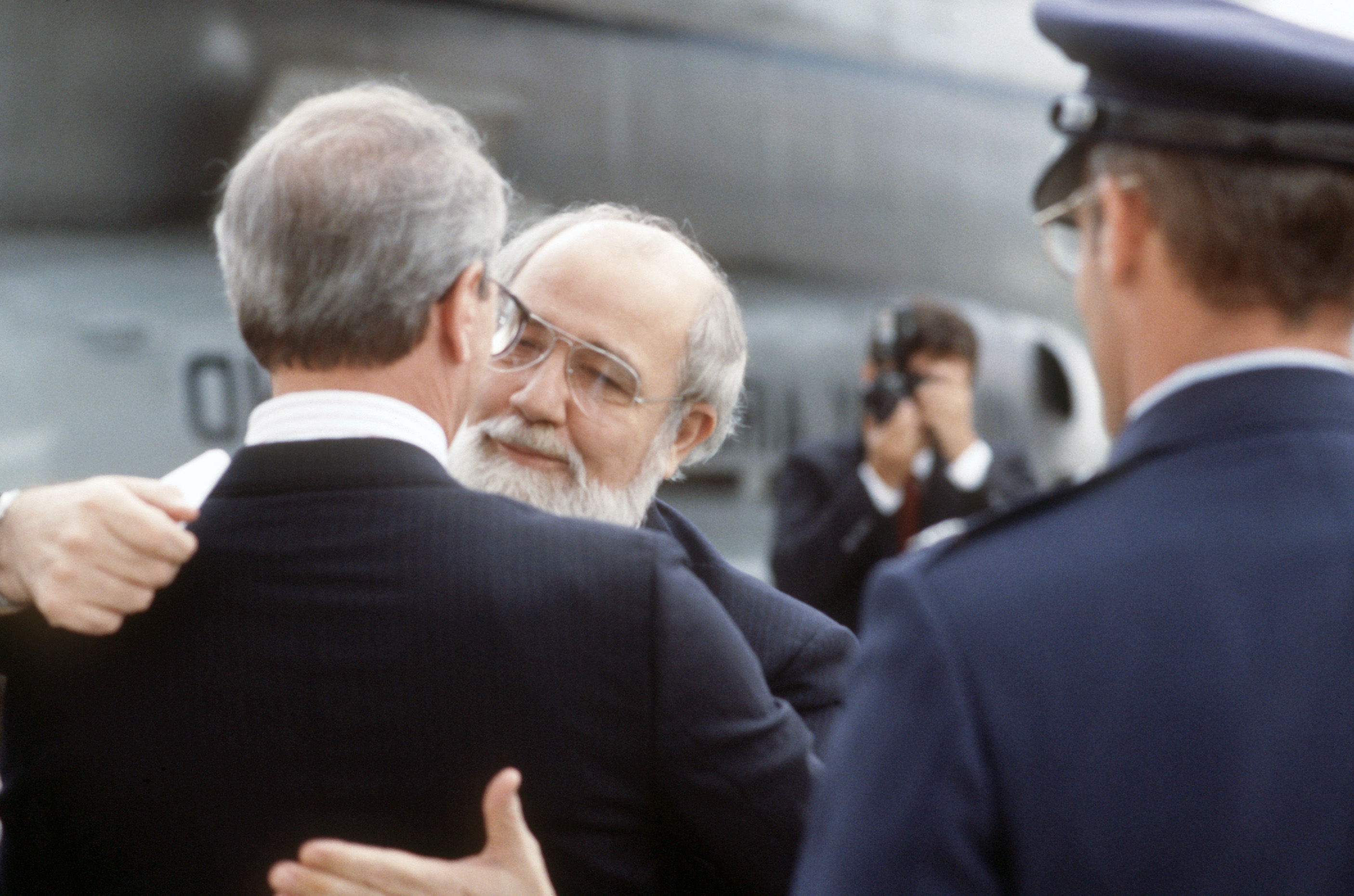
The Reverend Lawrence Jenco is welcomed home upon his arrival on base

Lawrence Martin Jenco, OSM (27 November 1934 – 19 July 1996), was an American Catholic priest famous for being held hostage in Beirut, Lebanon by Islamic radicals. He was held captive for 564 days before being released and allowed to return to the United States. He was a member of the Servite Order.

== Early life and education ==
Lawrence Jenco was born in Joliet, Illinois on November 27, 1934, in a family of Slovak descent. He went to grade school at St. Bernard’s parish in Joliet. In high school, he studied at Mount Carmel College in Niagara Falls, Canada (of the Carmelites) and at St. Joseph Seminary in St. Charles, Illinois (of the Servites). He entered the novitiate in 1950. Afterwards, he studied philosophy at Our Lady of Riverside Seminary in Riverside, California and theology at Collegio Internazionale Sant'Alessio in Rome, Italy. In 1959, he was ordained as a priest in Rome.

In 1981, he began working for the Catholic Relief Services overseas, initially being sent to North Yemen. He was reassigned to Bangkok, Thailand in 1983. He arrived in Beirut, Lebanon in 1984.

== Kidnapping ==
Jenco was taken hostage in Beirut by five armed men on January 8, 1985, while serving as director of Catholic Relief Services there.

In his book Bound to Forgive, Jenco relives his kidnapping and imprisonment, and offers portraits of the Shiite Muslims who held him captive. He also discusses how his faith sustained him. He spent much of his time in prayer and meditation, making a rosary out of threads from a sack, and celebrated clandestine Masses whenever he could. At times, he was imprisoned with other hostages (such as Terry A. Anderson and Benjamin Weir) who worshipped together as "The Church of the Locked Door".

Jenco spent much of his time chained and blindfolded, and was allowed to use the toilet only once a day. He suffered serious eye infections and other health problems as a result of his captivity. In changing from one hiding place to another, he was bound with tape and placed in stifling hiding places in trucks, lest he be found by soldiers or police inspecting a vehicle. He also suffered beatings by the guards.

=== Release ===
After a period of 18 months' imprisonment, Jenco was freed on July 26, 1986, after months of negotiations involving the Reagan Administration, Shiite radicals and the Anglican envoy Terry Waite, who was himself later held hostage in Beirut for four and a half years.

Toward the end of his captivity, Jenco was asked by one of his guards if he forgave his captors. Jenco tells in his book that at that moment he realised that he was being called to forgive, to "let go of revenge, retaliation and vindictiveness". Jenco received the Peace Abbey Courage of Conscience Award for his capacity to forgive his captors having been held hostage for 18 months and tortured by religious extremists in Beirut.

He became campus minister at the University of Southern California following his release. In 1995, Jenco wrote the book Bound to Forgive: the Pilgrimage to Reconciliation of a Beirut Hostage.

== Death and legacy ==
In 1996, Jenco died of pancreatic and lung cancer in the rectory of St. Domitilla Church in Hillside, Illinois. He is buried in the Queen of Heaven Cemetery in Hillside, Illinois.

In 2001, federal judge Royce Lamberth awarded the estate and family of Jenco $314.6 million in damages from Iran for the period he was held hostage in Lebanon. The ruling includes $14.6 million in compensatory damages to Jenco and his six siblings or their estates and $300 million in punitive damages. Jenco "was treated little better than a caged animal" said Lamberth in his ruling, which laid the blame upon the Iranian government. The Iranian government defaulted on the lawsuit, declining to answer any of the allegations. Victims of foreign terrorism are allowed by law to collect court judgments from the U.S. government.

The Father Lawrence Jenco Foundation was founded by fellow hostage and friend Terry A. Anderson in 2001. It seeks to support people doing faith-based charitable work in Appalachia.

== See also ==
- List of kidnappings
- List of solved missing person cases: 1950–1999
