= Terry A. Anderson =

American journalist (1947–2024)

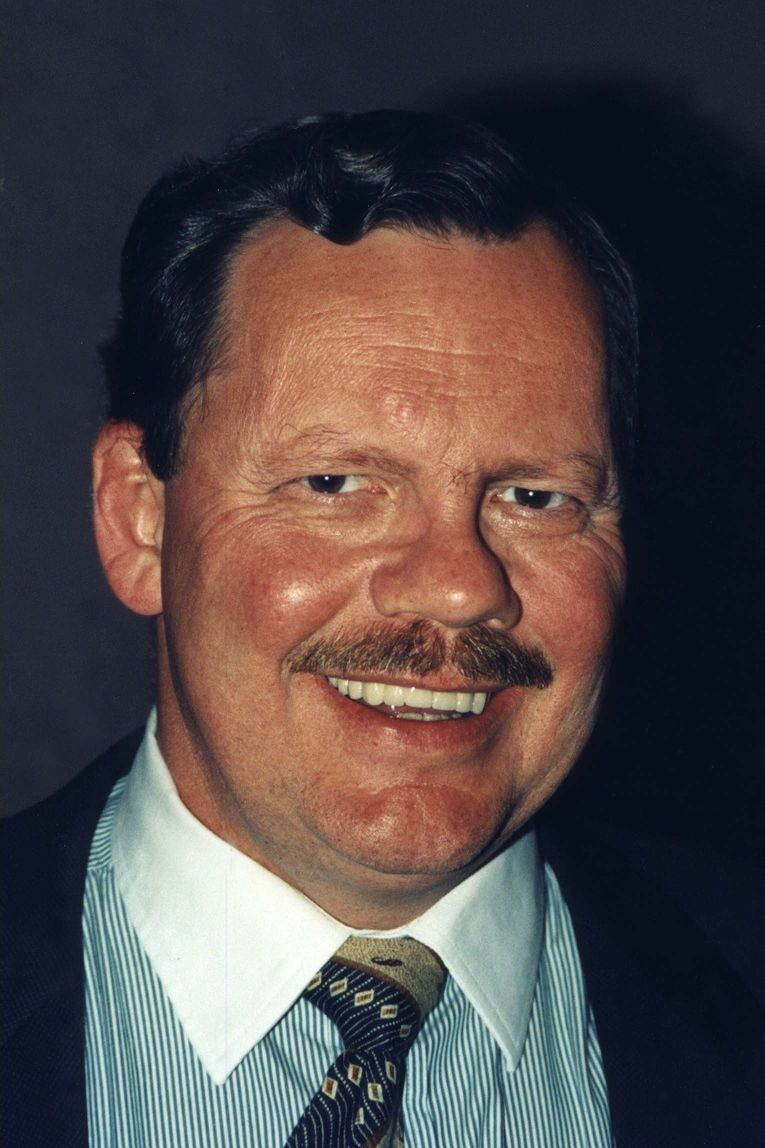
- Anderson in 1996
- Born: October 27, 1947; Lorain, Ohio, U.S.
- Died: April 21, 2024 (aged 76); Greenwood Lake, New York, U.S.
- Education: Iowa State University
- Occupation: Journalist
- Employers: Columbia University; Ohio University; Syracuse University; University of Florida; University of Kentucky
- Known for: Hostage in Lebanon (1985–1991)
- Spouses: Mihoko Anderson (divorced): Madeleine Bassil
- Children: 2

Signature
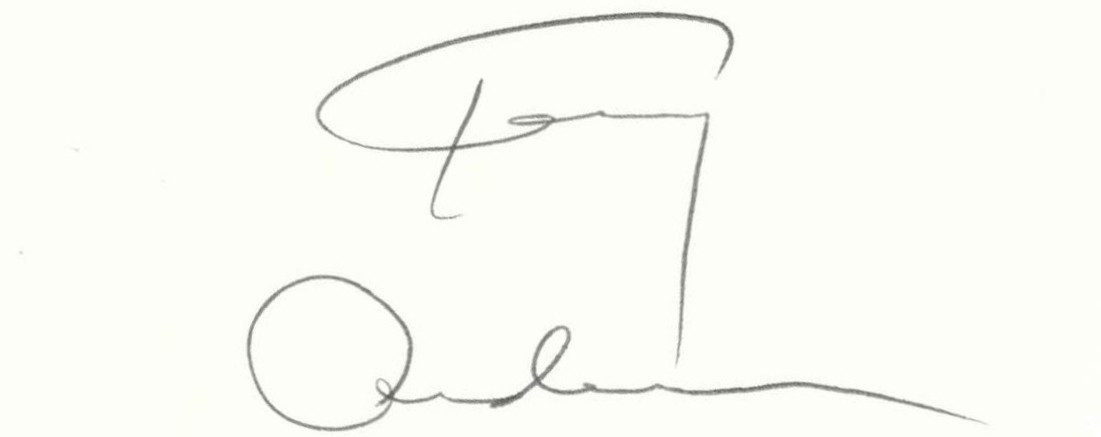

Terry Alan Anderson (October 27, 1947 – April 21, 2024) was an American journalist and combat veteran. He reported for the Associated Press. In 1985, he was taken hostage by Shia Hezbollah militants of the Islamic Jihad Organization in Lebanon and held until 1991. In 2004, he ran unsuccessfully for the Ohio State Senate.

== Early life ==
Anderson was born in Lorain, Ohio, on October 27, 1947. In Lorain, his father Glen Anderson was the village police officer and, later, when his family moved to Batavia, New York, his mother Lily (Lunn) Anderson was a waitress and his father was a truck driver. He was raised in Batavia, New York, and graduated from Batavia High School in 1965.

A professional journalist, he was in the United States Marine Corps for six years, serving as a combat journalist for five years among Japan, Okinawa, and Vietnam. He served two tours of duty in Vietnam during the Vietnam War. As a staff sergeant in the Marine Corps, he spent his final year at Ames, Iowa, as a recruiter for the Marine Corps during the Vietnam War.

After his discharge he enrolled at Iowa State University, graduating in 1974 with dual degrees: one in journalism and mass communication, the other in political science. During his studies at Iowa State, he was employed as a part time photographer and reporter at the KRNT radio and television station in Des Moines. He then joined the Associated Press, serving in Kentucky, South Korea, Japan and South Africa before being assigned to Lebanon as chief Middle Eastern correspondent for next two and a half years beginning in 1983.

== Hostage in Lebanon ==
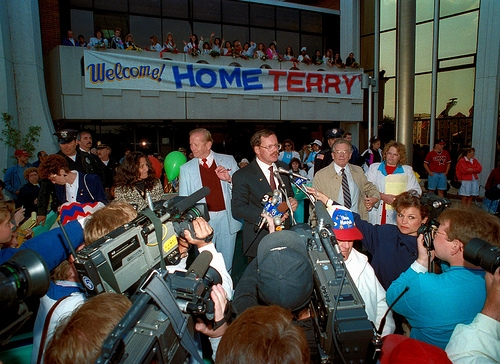
Anderson being welcomed home to Lorain, Ohio, on June 21, 1992

On March 16, 1985, Anderson had just finished a tennis game when he was abducted from the street in Beirut, placed in the trunk of a car, and taken to a secret location where he was imprisoned. For the next six years and nine months, he was held captive, being moved periodically to new sites. His captors were a group of Hezbollah Shiite Muslims who were supported by Iran in supposed retaliation for Israel's use of U.S. weapons and aid in its 1982–83 strikes against Muslim and Druze targets in Lebanon. He was the longest-held of the Western hostages captured by Hezbollah in an effort to drive U.S. military forces from Lebanon during the Lebanese Civil War. (Note: While Anderson was in Lebanon during the civil war, others held captive were several U.S. citizens, including William Francis Buckley, CIA station chief in Beirut; Thomas Sutherland, the dean of agriculture at the American University of Beirut; Catholic priest, Father Lawrence Jenco; David P. Jacobsen, administrator at the American University Hospital of Beirut; Presbyterian minister Benjamin Weir; Jerry Levin, CNN's Beirut bureau chief; Frank Reed, head of the Lebanese International School; Joseph Cicippio, deputy controller of the American University of Beirut; Edward Tracy, a bookseller and writer in Beirut; and Professors Alann Steen, Jesse Turner, and Robert Polhill. The special envoy Terry Waite, who went to Lebanon to negotiate the release of numerous hostages held in Lebanon including Terry Anderson, became a hostage and was involved in the Irangate scandal.)

During his captivity, numerous persons fiercely advocated for his release including his older sister Peggy Say, who rallied support from Mother Teresa, Pope John Paul II, Yasir Arafat, and Ronald Reagan, professional journalists Dan Rather and Kevin Cooney, who was a close friend from Anderson's days in Iowa, his fellow colleagues at the Associated Press and numerous other journalists who had covered war zones.

Anderson was released on December 4, 1991, and said he had forgiven his captors. Later, when asked if he would return to the Middle East as a correspondent, he stated, "I wouldn't go there for a million dollars. It is very dangerous."

== Post-captivity life ==
After his release, Anderson taught courses at the Columbia Graduate School of Journalism and at the E.W. Scripps School of Journalism at Ohio University. He wrote a best selling memoir of his experience as a hostage, titled Den of Lions (1994).

He filed suit against the Iranian government for his captivity, and, on March 24, 2000, was awarded a $324 million settlement from frozen Iranian assets by U.S. District Judge Thomas Penfield Jackson based upon a 1996 anti-terrorism law which allows United States citizens, who are victims of terrorist acts abroad, the right in United States courts to sue foreign countries which are classified as sponsors of terrorism by the United States State Department. Estimates put the amount he actually received at $26 million. The judgement from U.S. District Judge Jackson also awarded $10 million to his second wife Madeleine Bassil and $6.7 million to their daughter Sulome Anderson with $40 million for his parents Glen and Lily (Lunn) Anderson through additional lawsuits.

Anderson for some time lived in Nicholasville, Kentucky, teaching journalism and diversity at the University of Kentucky. In 2009, Anderson joined the faculty of the School of Journalism at the University of Kentucky in Lexington, Kentucky. In November 2009, he filed for bankruptcy under chapter 7. In 2011, he became a visiting professional at the S.I. Newhouse School of Public Communications at Syracuse University. In 2013, he acted as Honorary Chair of the Committee to Protect Journalists, a non-profit that supports press freedom around the globe. In 2014, he moved to Hidden Village in Gainesville, Florida, to teach a course in international journalism at the University of Florida.

== Philanthropy ==
With some of his settlement, Anderson, Marcia Landau and actress Kieu Chinh founded the Vietnam Children's Fund, which has built more than 50 schools in Vietnam.

Anderson also created the Father Lawrence Jenco Foundation with a $100,000 endowment to honor and support people who do charitable and community service projects in Appalachia. Lawrence Jenco was a former Catholic Relief Services director in Beirut who also was kidnapped. The two men met in jail. Jenco, who died in 1996, wrote his memoirs, Bound to Forgive, for which Anderson wrote the preface.

== 2004 State Senate campaign ==
In December 2003 Anderson announced his candidacy on the Democratic ticket to represent the 20th District in the Ohio Senate. His opponent was Republican candidate Joy Padgett, who had been appointed to the seat earlier in the term. Padgett ran controversial ads suggesting that Anderson would be soft on terrorism: the ads showed Anderson shaking hands with one of his former kidnappers. He received 46% of the vote in a district that leans Republican; the seat has been held by Republicans since 1977.

== Personal life ==
Anderson was married and divorced three times. He met his first wife, Mihoko Anderson, while he was a Marine stationed with the Armed Forces Radio and Television Service in Japan. They had one daughter, but later divorced. After 1982, he became engaged to Madeleine Bassil, a Lebanese native from a Maronite Christian family; they had one daughter, Sulome Anderson, born in 1985, three months after he was taken hostage. After his release, Anderson and Bassil were married in 1993, but later divorced.

A fan of blues music, Anderson owned the Blue Gator from early 2002 until mid-2008, a blues bar in Athens, Ohio, which hosted regional and national acts.

In an interview in the spring 1995 newsletter of the School of Journalism Alumni Association, University of Nebraska–Lincoln, by Will Norton Jr., Anderson is quoted:

Is there going to be peace in the world? I'm a Christian. I believe eventually there will be, at the second coming. I think we are moving into an era of greater, or if not peace, at least of greater prosperity. Think about it: In the last 10 to 15 years there are hundreds of millions of people in the world who are living in a greater degree of individual responsibility and freedom and perhaps dignity than there were 15 years ago. That's true in eastern Europe, in Latin America, even in Asia. That great process of history, of thousands of years of an increase in a dignity of the individual, seems to have been halted for a good period of time by the growth of totalitarian societies, and those are breaking up now. Certainly the totalitarian instinct has not gone away. There are a great many wars going on and struggles by peoples, but that ice jam, that blockage that was representative of the domination of a third of the world by communism, is gone. I think that's reason for great optimism.

Anderson died at his home in Greenwood Lake, New York, on April 21, 2024, at the age of 76. He had recently undergone heart surgery.

Anderson's papers are held at Iowa State University.

== See also ==
- List of kidnappings
- List of solved missing person cases: 1950–1999
- Iran Contra
- Rick Ross
- Danilo Blandón
- Roberto Suárez
- Jorge Roca
