= Hussein al-Musawi =

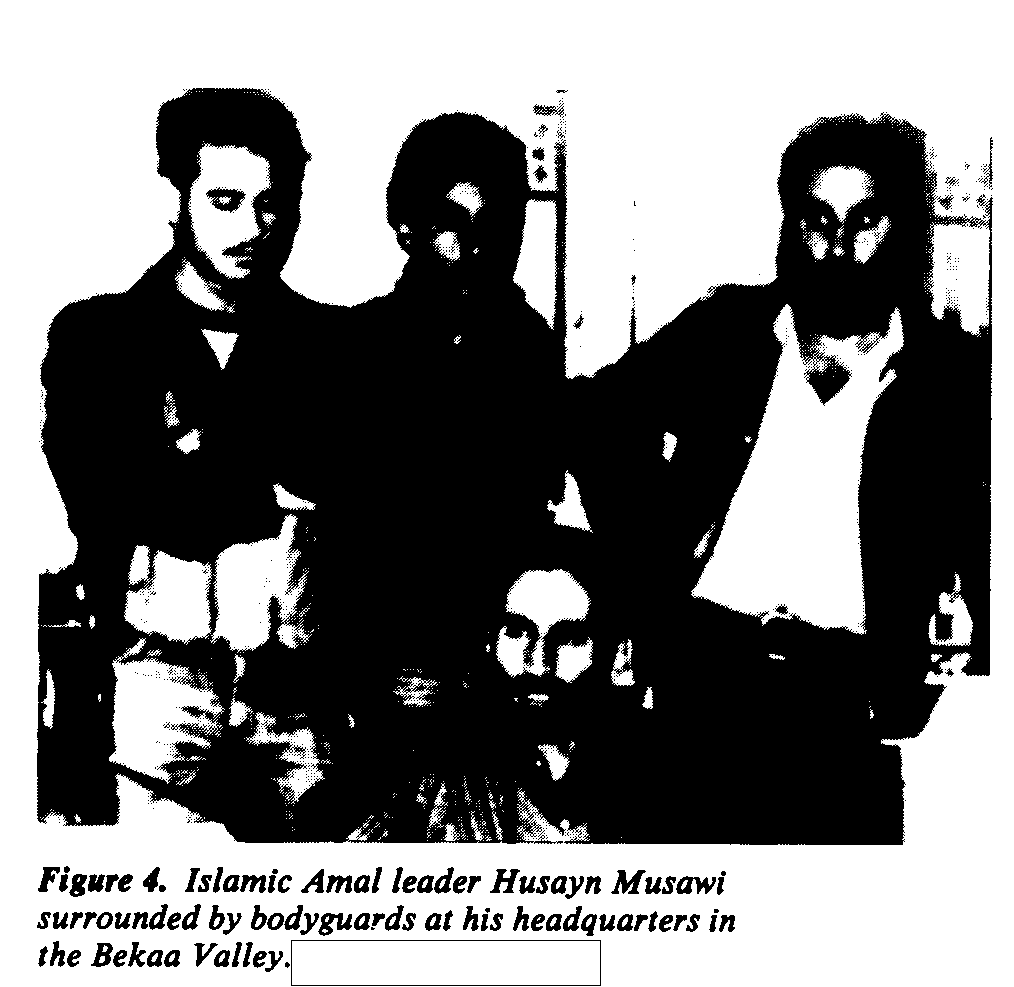
A photograph of Hussein al-Musawi (center.)

Hussein al-Musawi (also Hussein Musawi; Arabic: حسين الموسوي; died in 1990) was a Lebanese radical Shia Islamist militant founder and leader of Islamic Amal, a pro-Iran Shia Islamist militia. he was well-known for his pro-Khomeinism views and for his activities against the Israel is also seen as notable founding member of Hezbollah in Lebanon.

Musawi was a "chemistry teacher turned militia commander" who became the deputy head and official spokesman of the Amal movement/party/militia, Lebanon's largest Shi'ite movement. He was a Shia Muslim activist and chemist from Baalbek.

On June 21, 1982, he defected from Amal to start the Islamic Amal splinter group, operating out of Baalbek, Lebanon. Musawi disapproved of Amal leader Nabih Berri's participation in the first session of the six-man Lebanese National Salvation Committee, his acceptance of "U.S. diplomatic efforts to end the Israeli siege of West Beirut, which was also Amal's strong hold," and his opposition to the pledging of pan-Islamic allegiance by Amal to Iranian Revolutionary Islamist leader Ayatollah Khomeini.

Under his leadership, Islamic Amal captured the Lebanese Gendarmerie barracks in Baalbeck on November 21, 1982. The barracks were later used by the Iranian Islamic Revolutionary Guards Corps.

Musawi was a strong supporter of Iran. Musawi's pro-Iranian position was in part a reflection of having been trained in Iran and having been one of the elite protégés of Mostafa Chamran, the Iranian Defense Minister who had worked in Lebanon with Amal before the Shah's overthrow.

We are her [Iran's] children. We are seeking to formulate an Islamic society which in the final analysis will produce an Islamic state. ... The Islamic revolution will march to liberate Palestine and Jerusalem, and the Islamic state will then spread its authority over the region of which Lebanon is only a part.

Musawi was also a prominent member of Hezbollah (where he served on the consultative council.)

When then French and American MNF peacekeeping force was attacked by suicide bombers killing over 300 he denied responsibility but expressed his admiration

"I salute this good act, and I consider it a good deed and a legitimate right, and I bow to the spirits of the martyrs who carried out this operation"

He is also reported to have been involved in the kidnapping of foreigners in Lebanon during the Lebanon Hostage Crisis, holding the victims in the village of Ras al-Ein, in the Beqaa Valley of East Lebanon.

In 1986 Iranian officials pressured Husayn Al-Musawi to dissolve Islamic Amal. He refused. Others date Islamic Amal being subsumed by Hezbollah much earlier. Robin Wright says the two groups were "effectively becoming one under the Hizbollah label," by August 1983 when they infiltrate West Beirut's poor Shi'ite suburbs, while "by late 1984" Hezbollah "had absorbed" Islamic Amal along with "all the known major extremist groups."

He was killed in 1990 by an Israeli rocket in an ambush in southern Lebanon.
