= 1984 Libyan hostage incident =

Hostage incident involving Libya and the UK in 1984

The Libyan hostage situation began on the morning of the murder of police constable Yvonne Fletcher at the Libyan Embassy in London, 17 April 1984, and lasted until 5 February 1985 (294 days). In accordance with the hostage release agreement, reporting on the incident was restricted until the fall of Muammar Gaddafi in 2011.

== Timeline ==
=== March 1984 ===
Four Libyan nationals were arrested on charges following explosions at Manchester and London Heathrow in the UK and were remanded in custody.

=== 17 April 1984 ===
During a protest organised by the NFSL, a Libyan opposition group, police constable Yvonne Fletcher was hit by a bullet from a burst of machine-gun fire from within the Libyan People's Bureau (Libyan Embassy) in St James's Square, London. She died shortly afterwards.

That evening, Doug Ledingham, the airport manager for British Caledonian Airways at Tripoli Universal Airport, Libya, was arrested by soldiers.

=== 17 to 27 April ===
There was a standoff between the Libyan and British governments over the pursuit of who shot WPC Fletcher. The standoff resulted in the breaking of diplomatic relations by Britain with Libya, and the return to Libya under diplomatic immunity of the occupants of the Libyan Peoples' Bureau in London. Rumours abounded at the time as to the fate of the person who is alleged to have fired the fatal shots from the Libyan People's Bureau. In 1986, a British businessman who had worked for Colonel Gaddafi's regime reported WPC Fletcher's killer had been hanged as soon as he returned to Libya.

Following the breaking of diplomatic relations with Libya, the British Embassy in Tripoli was evacuated by the British and ransacked by the Libyans. A skeleton staff of British diplomats took up office in the Italian Embassy.

=== 8 May 1984 ===
Militants from the NFSL attempted to assassinate Gaddafi at Bab Al-Aziza barracks in Tripoli. The attempt lead to several deaths in the fighting. Some 2,000 Libyans were arrested following the attack, and eight were hanged publicly.

=== 14-16 May 1984 ===
Four further British men in Libya were rounded up and detained as hostages against the four arrested Libyan nationals in Britain by those claiming to be officials of the Gaddafi regime. The men in order of capture were: Michael Berdinner, Alan Russell, Malcolm Anderson and Robin Plummer. At first, Allen Russell and Malcolm Anderson were held at a separate location where they were questioned and beaten. Ledingham, Berdinner and Plummer (Plummer in solitary confinement) were in the same facility, the Italian Mansion, a building approximately 400 yards distant from the Italian Embassy.

=== 12 June 1984 ===
A month after being taken hostage, the five men were allowed a meeting with the British Second Consul, George Anderson, who was able to offer only pastoral care and contact with home, but no suggestion of release. It was clear by this time, however, that the men were being held as hostages by one of Col Gaddafi's Revolutionary Committees, in defiance of international law. Return to their respective prisons was followed by little or no improvement in the hostages' circumstances.

=== 19 July 1984 ===
A second meeting with George Anderson resulted in all the hostages being put into one location, the Italian Mansion, and being fed an improved diet and given medical attention. This improvement in circumstances was accompanied by a slow but inexorable descent into gloom of the hostages isolated from all news of the outside world.

Meanwhile, in Britain, unbeknownst to the hostages, their families, notably Pat Plummer and Carole Russell, were working tirelessly with Kate Adie of the BBC and Brent Sadler of ITN to keep the hostages' plight in the media to keep the situation in the news and the profile high on the government's agenda. By now, the families were being kept up to date on a daily basis by contacts within the Foreign and Commonwealth Office in London as to the stalemate between Libya and Britain, with a continual decline in international relations between Libya and most of the rest of the world.

=== Summer 1984 ===
In London, a committee in parliament was held to determine whether or not what the British government had done over the Libyan hostage situation was reasonable. The committee concluded that in the circumstances, the British government had done all it reasonably could in the light of what little was known at the time.

=== 7 August 1984 ===
The Libyans allowed family members to visit the hostages. These visits brought unofficial news of the, as yet, publicly undisclosed involvement of Terry Waite, the Special Envoy to the Archbishop of Canterbury, of the Church of England.

=== 1 September 1984 ===
Doug Ledingham and George Bush, another prisoner, arrested and detained on bona fide charges unrelated to the Libyan hostage situation, were freed and allowed home. On the day of their release, British television news was granted access to and showed the world for the first time, detail of the hostage situation.

=== 17 October 1984 ===
Two of the wives of the hostages, Pat Plummer and Carole Russell, attended a meeting with the Prime Minister Margaret Thatcher. The two wives petitioned for a representative of the British Government to go to Libya and start negotiations for the release of the hostages. This meeting was soon followed by the arrival in Libya of Terry Waite.

=== 21 October 1984 ===
Alan Russell and Malcolm Anderson were removed from the Italian Mansion and taken to the Libyan courts, where they were charged with transporting state secrets.

=== 10–18 November 1984 ===
Terry Waite was in Libya. The hostage situation showed no signs of thawing, in spite of national and international efforts to secure the release of the hostages and the intervention at a pastoral level of Waite.

=== 13–14 December 1984 ===
Allen Russell was placed on trial and charged with sharing state secrets with British journalists. Robin Plummer seized the opportunity to speak to the press, stated his innocence and made a plea for warm clothing.

=== 24 December 1984 ===
The four men were confirmed as political hostages by Gaddafi. Waite held a Christmas carol service with the hostages.

=== 6 January 1985 ===
Col Gaddafi himself placed the matter of the remaining hostages before the members of the Basic and General People's Congresses, the systems of democracy prevalent in Libya at the time, for a decision on the release of the hostages.

=== 1 February 1985 ===
WPC Fletcher's memorial was unveiled, which temporarily disrupted negotiations and sent a very clear message to the Libyans.

=== 5 February 1985 ===
The Congresses voted by an overwhelming majority to release the hostages, but with conditions attached. For undisclosed reasons, the release was also subject to a few days' delay.

=== 7 February 1985 ===
After almost nine months (294 days), the hostages arrived back in England.
