= Tahseen Bashir =

Egyptian diplomat

- تحسين بشير
- Born: April 1925
- Died: June 11, 2002 (aged 77); Cairo, Egypt
- Education: Alexandria University; Princeton University; Harvard University
- Occupation: Diplomat

Tahseen Bashir, or Tahsin Basheer, (April 1925 – June 11, 2002) was an Egyptian diplomat who served as both a confidant and spokesman for several Egyptian presidents, including Gamal Nasser and Anwar Sadat. In 1977, Bashir was appointed Egypt's ambassador to the Arab League, and later he served as ambassador to Canada until 1985.

He coined several memorable political phrases. Regarding his belief in the centrality of Egypt within the Middle East he opined, "Egypt is the only nation-state in the Arab world; the rest are just tribes with flags".

When asked why the Egyptian President Mubarak had not made more changes in his cabinet, Bashir remarked, "Because their tombs weren't ready." Bashir viewed Mubarak's listless, gentrified advisors as "The mummification of the Egyptian cabinet". Bashir wrote a critique of Mubarak's under-performing economic policies titled "I Support You but I Do Not Endorse You" in a September 1992 issue of Al Wafd newspaper.

His first wife was Sana Hasan, who eventually moved to Israel and wrote Enemy in the Promised Land (1988) which described her experiences there; they later divorced. His second wife was long-time intimate, Laila Ibrahim Basmy, whom he married barely a month before his death.

Two book titles by Charles Glass have used Bashir's Tribes With Flags quote: Tribes With Flags: A Dangerous Passage Through the Chaos of the Middle East (April 1990) and Tribes With Flags: A Journey Curtailed (1992).

Another version of Bashir's 'flag' quip is: “'When the chips are down, there is only one real place in the entire area – Egypt,' a Cairo diplomat once declared. 'All the rest – forgive me – are tribes with flags.'"

He graduated from Alexandria University, Princeton University, and Harvard University.
