= John McCarthy (journalist) =

British journalist (born 1956)

John Patrick McCarthy CBE
- Born: 27 November 1956 (age 69)
- Education: Lochinver House School; Haileybury ISC
- Alma mater: University of Hull
- Occupations: Journalist, writer, broadcaster
- Known for: Kidnapped for over five years during the Lebanon hostage crisis
- Notable work: Some Other Rainbow (1993)
- Spouse: Anna Ottewill (m. 1999)
- Partner: Jill Morrell (former)
- Children: 1

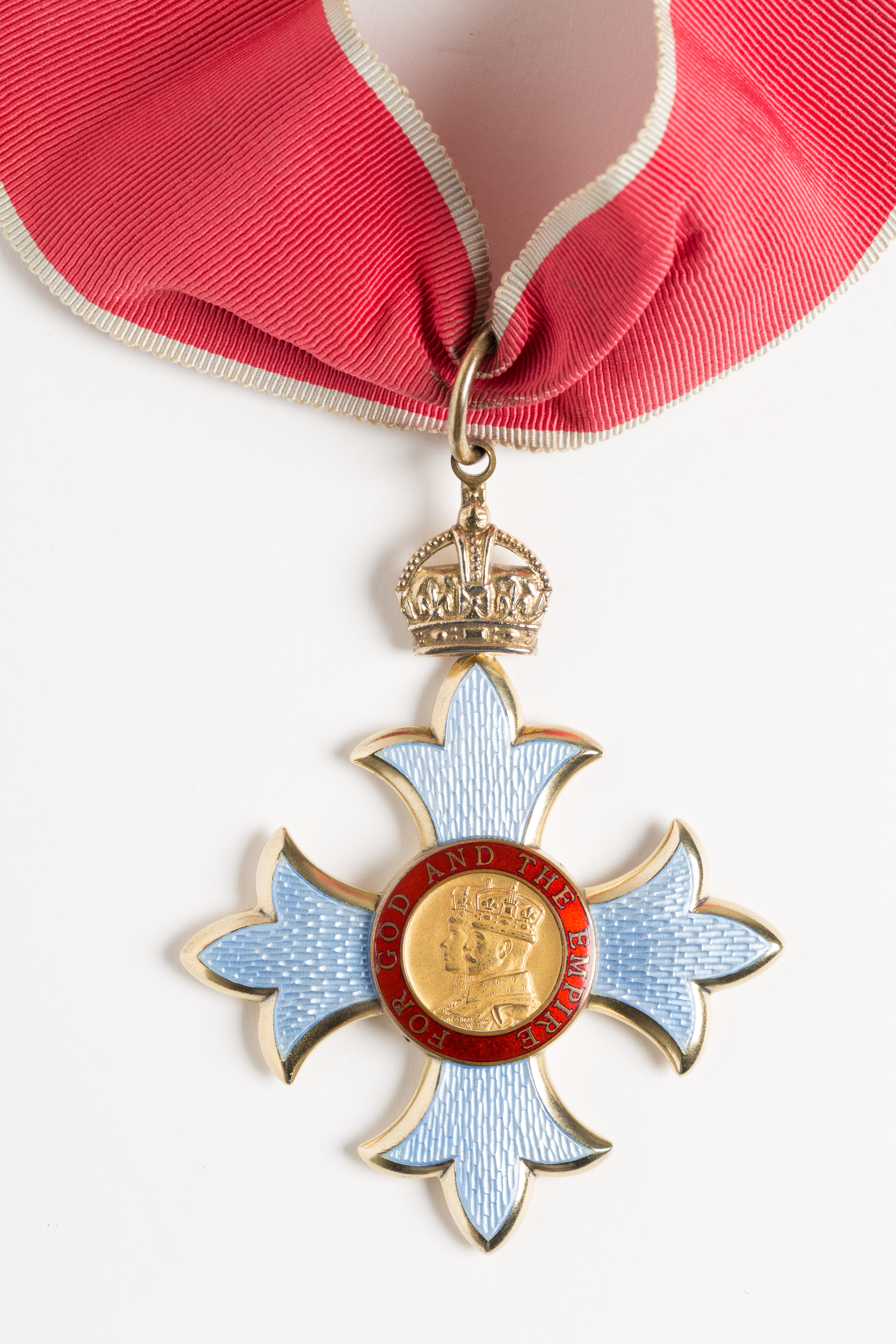
CBE insignia

John Patrick McCarthy CBE (born 27 November 1956), is a British journalist, writer and broadcaster, and one of the hostages in the Lebanon hostage crisis. McCarthy was the longest-held British hostage in Lebanon, having been imprisoned for more than five years.

== Career ==
A scion of ancient Irish nobility, twin son of Patrick McCarthy (1927–2021) and Sheila née O'Brien, he attended Lochinver House School in Potters Bar, then Haileybury College in Hertfordshire, before studying American Studies at the University of Hull (BA, 1979).

McCarthy was a journalist working for United Press International Television News at the time of his kidnap by Islamic Jihad terrorists in Lebanon. He had recently arrived in Beirut when on 17 April 1986, two days after USAF airstrikes on Libya, Worldwide Television News ordered him to leave. He was being escorted to the airport when a group of gunmen intercepted his car. He was held in captivity until release on 8 August 1991. He shared a cell with the Irish hostage Brian Keenan for several years. While a prisoner, he learned that his girlfriend, Jill Morrell, was actively campaigning for his release, launching a group called "Friends of John McCarthy".

By the time of McCarthy's release, his mother Sheila had died of cancer in 1989, unaware of his fate. Following his release, he co-wrote, with Morrell, a memoir of his years in captivity, entitled Some Other Rainbow. Their relationship ended four years later, and he married Anna Ottewill, a photographer, on 16 April 1999. They have a daughter.

In 1995, John McCarthy sailed around the coast of Britain with Sandi Toksvig, making a BBC documentary TV series, Island Race, and a book of the experience. McCarthy attended Hull University with her elder brother, Nick Toksvig. He co-presented the BBC Radio 4 programme Excess Baggage, also with Sandi Toksvig. On 29 March 2014, McCarthy hosted the ceremony for the "I Do To Equal Marriage" event which celebrated the introduction of same-sex marriage in England and Wales. Toksvig renewed her vows to her civil partner at the event.

== Honours and family ==
McCarthy is a Patron of Freedom from Torture (formerly the Medical Foundation for the Care of Victims of Torture), and has been awarded an Hon. D.Litt from his alma mater, the University of Hull, where the Students' Union named a bar (now an ice cream parlour) after him.

Appointed CBE in the 1992 New Year Honours List, his twin younger brother, Terence David McCarthy, served as Bluemantle Pursuivant of Arms.

== Media references ==
- The set of Series 1 of Drop the Dead Donkey, first aired in 1990, included a copy of a "Wanted" poster with McCarthy's photograph released during the campaign on his behalf. It is displayed on the wall in the news room and is frequently in shot, but not mentioned in the programme.
- The 1992 HBO film Hostages (1992 film), starring Colin Firth as McCarthy, was a fictionalised account of the Lebanon hostage crisis.
- A film version of his and Keenan's kidnapping and incarceration was made in 2003. Titled Blind Flight, the British film was directed by John Furse starring Ian Hart as Keenan and Linus Roache as McCarthy.
- In 2006 McCarthy collaborated with the composer Adam Gorb and the librettist Ben Kaye to create Thoughts Scribbled on a Blank Wall, an exploration of the mental torture he underwent during his long incarceration. Commissioned by JAM (John Armitage Memorial), the work premiered in Fleet Street to critical acclaim in 2007 and was described by BBC Radio 3's Sean Rafferty as "Powerful stuff. A protest Cantata, the first of a genre." Thoughts Scribbled on a Blank Wall was scheduled for CD release in 2011.
- The Stiff Little Fingers song Beirut Moon was inspired by McCarthy's ordeal. It criticized the government for not acting to free him and was subsequently withdrawn from sale.
- A major Sky Arts series, Art of Faith, presented by McCarthy, was broadcast in 2008. The series, produced by Illuminations, was an exploration of the art and architecture of Islam, Christianity and Judaism. In 2009, production of a follow-up series of Art of Faith began, featuring Buddhism, Hinduism and religions of the Tao.

== Books ==
- John McCarthy; Jill Morrell (1993). Some Other Rainbow. Bantam Press. ISBN 978-0-593-02729-5.
- Brian Keenan; John McCarthy (1999). Between Extremes. Bantam Press. ISBN 978-0-593-04264-9.
- John McCarthy (2010). A Ghost Upon Your Path. Transworld Publishers Limited. ISBN 978-0-552-77650-9.
- John McCarthy (2013). You Can't Hide the Sun: A Journey Through Palestine. Transworld Publishers Limited. ISBN 978-0-552-77447-5.

=== Books about McCarthy ===
- An Evil Cradling; by Brian Keenan (McCarthy as main character) Penguin Books ISBN 0-14-023641-4

== See also ==
- Lebanese Civil War
- Lebanon hostage crisis
- Le Commodore Hotel Beirut
- List of kidnappings
- Sir Terry Waite
