= Sulome Anderson =

American journalist

Sulome Anderson (born 1985) is an American journalist. Her work has been published in Newsweek, Harper's, The Atlantic, and Foreign Policy.

In 2017, she published a book, The Hostage's Daughter: A Story of Family, Madness, and the Middle East which detailed her struggles with drug addiction and depression. The book won a bronze Nonfiction Book Award from the Nonfiction Authors Association.

Her father was journalist Terry A. Anderson, who was kidnapped and held hostage by Hezbollah from 1985 to 1991. Her mother is Madeleine Bassil, who is Lebanese Maronite Catholic. On April 22, 2024, she announced her father's death in Greenwood Lake, N.Y.
