= Islamic Amal =

Lebanese Shiite militia

- Leaders: Husayn Al-Musawi; Abdel Karim Obeid
- Dates active: June 1982–late 1987
- Split from: Amal Movement
- Merged into: Hezbollah
- Allegiance: Iran (IRGC)
- Headquarters: Baalbek
- Active regions: Baalbek; Beirut
- Ideology: Shia Islamism; Jihadism; Khomeinism; Anti-Zionism
- Size: 1,000 fighters
- Wars: Lebanese Civil War: 1982 Lebanon War

Islamic Amal (in Arabic أمل الإسلامية) was a Lebanese Shia military movement based in Baalbek in the Beqaa Valley. The movement was one of the core groups which later formed Hezbollah. It was led by Husayn Al-Musawi, who later became a leading figure in Hezbollah, and Abdel Karim Obeid, Islamic Amal's spiritual leader and later Hezbollah member.

The movement got its start in June 1982 when Nabih Berri, the head of Amal, agreed to participate in the Salvation Committee, a body set up by President Elias Sarkis following the Israeli invasion. The committee included Bachir Gemayel, the Maronite commander of the Lebanese Forces. Musawi considered Berri's actions "treasonous" and Amal's orientation too secular. In response, Musawi declared Nabih Berri a traitor, and broke from Amal to set up his own faction. The movement's ranks rapidly grew to around 1,000 militants.

Islamic Amal was backed by officials in the Iranian government, and it coordinated with units of Iran's (Pasdaran) Revolutionary Guards stationed around Baalbek. Even so, in 1986, when Iranian officials pressured Musawi to dissolve his organization, he refused. He agreed, however, to remain part of Hezbollah, and he reportedly served as a member of its Consultative Council.

Press reports linked Islamic Amal, like Hezbollah, to anti-Western violence in Lebanon. Although Musawi's rhetoric was vehemently anti-Western, as of late 1987 he had not claimed any violence in the name of Islamic Amal.

== History ==
The Islamic Amal Shia movement was initially focused on social and economic issues, such as improving the living conditions of the Shia population and providing access to education and healthcare. However, the movement later became involved in armed resistance against the Israeli occupation of Lebanon and the Lebanese Civil War.

During the Civil War, the Islamic Amal Shia movement formed an alliance with other Shia Muslim groups, such as Hezbollah, to resist the Israeli occupation and fight against other militias in Lebanon. The movement also became involved in sectarian conflict with Sunni Muslims and Palestinian groups.
