= Terry Waite =

English human rights activist (born 1939)

Sir Terry Waite KCMG CBE
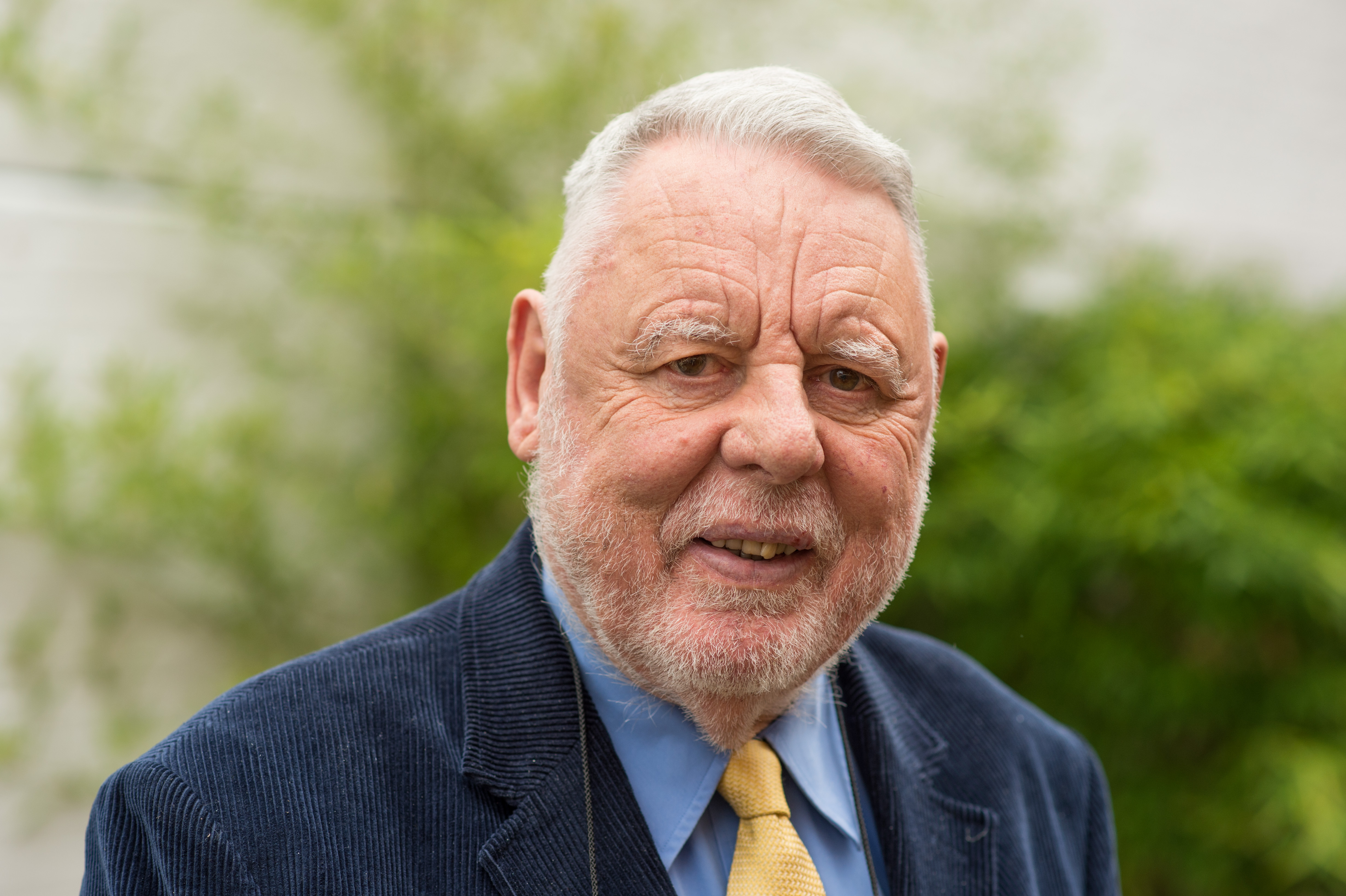
- Waite in 2016
- Born: Terence Hardy Waite; 31 May 1939 (age 87); Bollington, Cheshire, England
- Occupations: Humanitarian; author; negotiator
- Organisations: Hostage International; Y Care International

Sir Terence Hardy Waite (born 31 May 1939) is a British human rights activist and author.

Waite was the Assistant for Anglican Communion Affairs for the then Archbishop of Canterbury, Robert Runcie, in the 1980s. As an envoy for the Church of England, he travelled to Lebanon to try to secure the release of four hostages, including the journalist John McCarthy. He was himself kidnapped and held captive from 1987 to 1991.

After his release he wrote Taken on Trust (1994), a memoir about his experiences, and became involved in humanitarian causes and charitable work.

== Early life and career ==
Terence Hardy Waite was born on 31 May 1939 in Bollington, Cheshire, the son of a village policeman in Styal, Cheshire. Waite was educated at Stockton Heath County Secondary School where he became head boy. Although his parents were only nominally religious, he showed a commitment to Christianity from an early age and later became a Quaker and an Anglican.

Waite joined the Grenadier Guards at Caterham Barracks, but an allergy to a dye in the uniform obliged him to depart after a few months. He then considered a monastic life, but instead joined the Church Army, a social welfare organisation of the Anglican Church modelled on the Salvation Army, undergoing training and studies in London. While he was held captive in the 1980s, many Church Army officers wore a simple badge with the letter "H" on it to remind people that one of their members was still a hostage and was being supported in prayer daily by them and many others.

In 1963, Waite was appointed education adviser to the Anglican Bishop of Bristol, Oliver Tomkins, and assisted with Tomkins's implementation of the SALT (Stewardship and Laity Training) programme in the diocese, along with Basil Moss. This position required Waite to master psychological T-group methods, with the aim of promoting increased active involvement from the laity. During this time he married Helen Frances Watters. As a student, Waite was greatly influenced by the teachings of Ralph Baldry.

In 1969, he moved to Uganda where he worked as Provincial Training Adviser to Erica Sabiti, the first African Anglican Archbishop of Uganda, Rwanda, and Burundi and, in that capacity, travelled extensively throughout East Africa. Together with his wife and their four children, Waite witnessed the Idi Amin coup in Uganda and he and his wife narrowly escaped death on several occasions. From his office in Kampala, Waite founded the Southern Sudan Project and was responsible for developing aid and development programmes for the region.

His next post was in Rome, Italy where, from 1972, he worked as an international consultant to the Medical Mission Sisters, a Roman Catholic order seeking to adapt to the leadership reforms of Vatican II. From this base, he travelled extensively throughout Asia, Africa, the Americas and Europe, conducting and advising on programmes concerned with institutional change and development, inter-cultural relations, group and inter-group dynamics and a broad range of development issues connected with health and education.

== Archbishop's special envoy ==
Waite returned to the United Kingdom in 1978, where he took a job with the British Council of Churches. In 1980, the Archbishop of Canterbury, Robert Runcie, appointed him the Archbishop of Canterbury's Assistant for Anglican Communion Affairs on the recommendation of Tomkins and Bishop John Howe. Based at Lambeth Palace, Waite again travelled extensively throughout the world and had a responsibility for the Archbishop's diplomatic and ecclesiastical exchanges. He arranged and travelled with the archbishop on the first ever visit of an Archbishop of Canterbury to China and had responsibility for travels to Australia, New Zealand, Burma, the United States, Canada, the Caribbean and South Africa.

=== Hostage negotiator ===
In 1980, Waite successfully negotiated the release of several hostages in Iran: Iraj Mottahedeh (Anglican priest in Esfahan), Dimitri Bellos (diocesan officer), Nosrat Sharifian (Anglican priest in Kerman), Fazeli (church member), Jean Waddell (who was secretary to the Iranian Anglican bishop Hassan Dehqani-Tafti), Canon John Coleman and Coleman's wife Audrey. On 10 November 1984, he negotiated with Muammar Gaddafi for the release of the four remaining British hostages held in the Libyan Hostage Situation, Michael Berdinner, Alan Russell, Malcolm Anderson and Robin Plummer and was again successful.

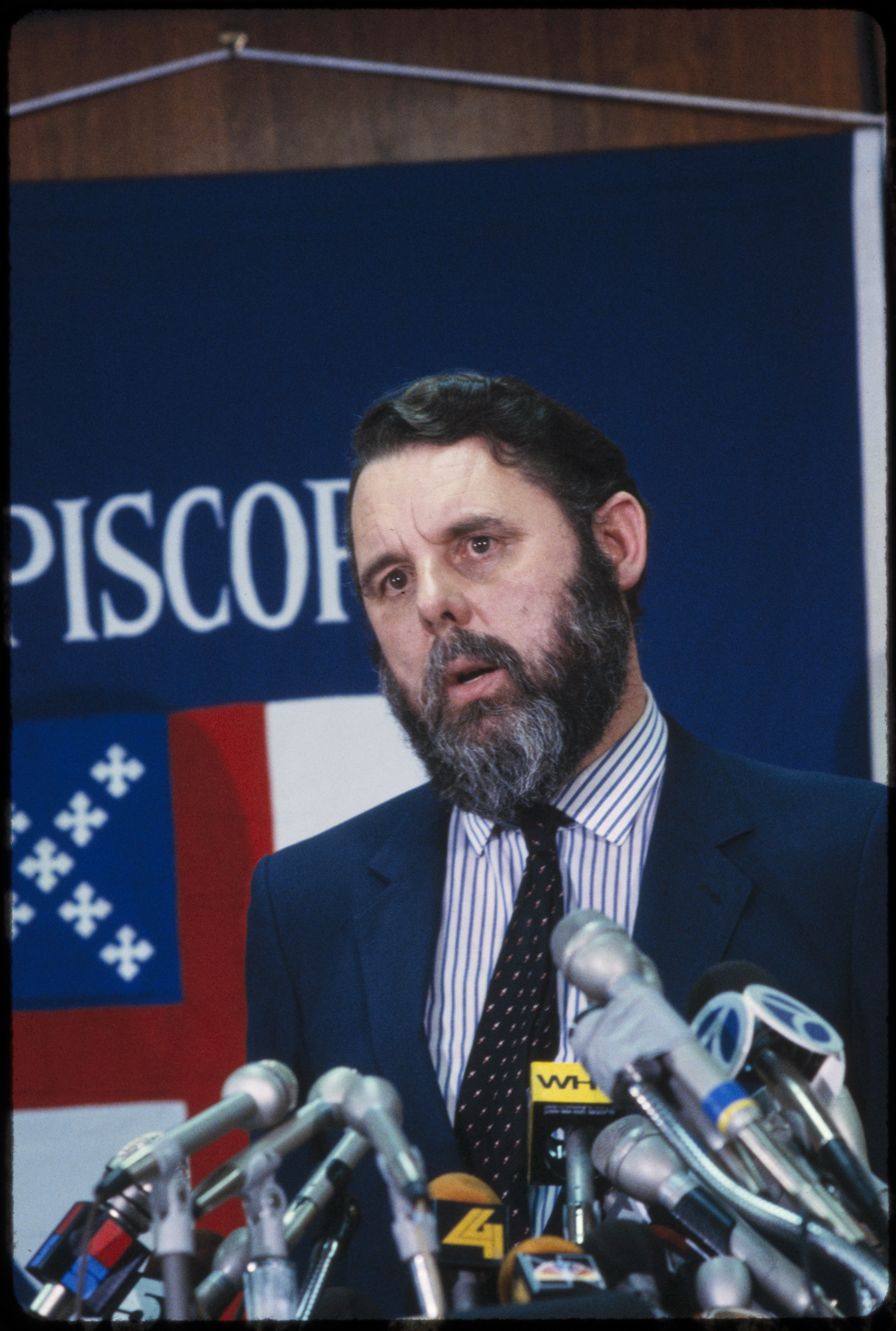
Terry Waite in 1985

From 1985, Waite became involved in hostage negotiation in Lebanon and assisted in negotiations which secured the release of Lawrence Jenco and David Jacobsen. American officials secretly facilitated the sale of arms to the Khomeini government of Iran with a view to obtaining Iranian help in the release of hostages held in Lebanon. Waite's use of an American helicopter to travel secretly between Cyprus and Lebanon, and his appearance with Lt Colonel Oliver North, meant that he was compromised when the Irangate scandal broke in 1986. Against advice, Waite felt a need to demonstrate his continuing trust and integrity, and his commitment to the remaining hostages.

=== Captivity and release ===
Waite arrived in Beirut on 12 January 1987 with the intention of negotiating with the Islamic Jihad Organization, which was holding hostages, including Terry A. Anderson and Thomas Sutherland. On 20 January, he agreed to meet the captors of the hostages as he was promised safe conduct to visit the hostages, who, he was told, were ill. The group broke trust and took him hostage. Waite remained in captivity for 1,763 days, the first four years of which were spent in solitary confinement. He was released on 18 November 1991.

== Release and afterwards ==
Following his release, he was elected a fellow commoner at Trinity Hall, Cambridge, where he wrote his first book, Taken on Trust (1994), a memoir of his captivity in Lebanon. It became a best-seller in the UK and internationally.

Waite decided to devote himself to studying, writing, lecturing and humanitarian activities. His second book, Footfalls in Memory, a further meditation on his captivity in Lebanon, was published in the UK in 1995 and also became a best-seller. His most recent book, published in October 2000, Travels with a Primate, is a humorous account of his journeys with his former boss, Robert Runcie. Waite has also contributed articles to many journals and periodicals, ranging from Reader's Digest to the Kipling Journal, and has also supplied articles and forewords to many books.

In 2004, Waite returned to Beirut for the first time since his release. He told the BBC, "If you are bitter, it will eat you up and do more damage to you than to the people who have hurt you."

On 31 March 2007, Waite offered to travel to Iran to negotiate with those holding British sailors and marines seized by Iran in disputed waters on 23 March 2007.

Waite travelled again to Beirut in December 2012 to reconcile with his captors and lay to rest what he described as the ghosts of the past.

== Charity work ==
In January 1996, Waite became patron of the Warrington Male Voice Choir in recognition of the humanitarian role adopted by the choir following the Warrington bomb attacks. Since then, he has appeared with the choir for performances in prisons in UK and Ireland to assist in rehabilitation programmes. Prison concerts have become a regular feature of the choir's Christmas activities.

Waite is co-founder and president of the charity Y Care International (YMCA's international development and relief agency) and in 2004, he founded Hostage UK, an organisation designed to give support to hostage families. Waite became president of Emmaus UK, a charity for formerly homeless people, shortly after his release from captivity in 1991.

He is patron of several organisations including Storybook Dads, a UK charity which allows prisoners to send recordings of themselves reading bedtime stories to their own children, to help stay connected to some of the 200,000 children affected by parental imprisonment each year. He is a patron of Habitat for Humanity Great Britain, the Romany Society and Strode Park Foundation in Kent.

== Honours and awards ==
In 1991, following his release Waite was elected a fellow commoner at Trinity Hall, Cambridge. In 1992, Waite received the Four Freedoms Award for the Freedom of Worship.

Waite has been awarded several honorary degrees:

- Durham University - Doctor of Civil Law in 1992
- University of Sussex - Doctor of Laws in 1992
- Anglia Ruskin University - Doctor of Philosophy in 2001
- Open University - DUniv in 2009
- University of Chester in 2009
- University of London - Doctor of Science in 2025
- Bangor University - Doctor of Divinity in 2026

In 2006 he was elected a visiting fellow of Magdalen College, Oxford.

Waite was appointed Knight Commander of the Order of St Michael and St George (KCMG) in the 2023 Birthday Honours for services to charity and humanitarian work.

== See also ==
- Le Commodore Hotel Beirut
- Lebanon hostage crisis
- List of kidnappings (1980–1989)
- List of solved missing person cases (1980s)
- Iran–Contra affair

== Bibliography ==
- Barnes, Trevor (1987). Terry Waite: Man with a Mission. London: Collins Fontana. ISBN 0-8028-0332-6.
- Bell, Ni (2011). In The Footsteps of War: Ninety Years of Remembrance. London: Brimar Entertainment. ISBN 978-0-9570902-0-0.
- Bell, Ni (2015). In The Footsteps of War: The Definitive Edition. London, United Kingdom: Brimar Entertainment. ISBN 978-0-9570902-6-2.
