= Thomas Sutherland (academic) =

American academic and hostage (1931–2016)

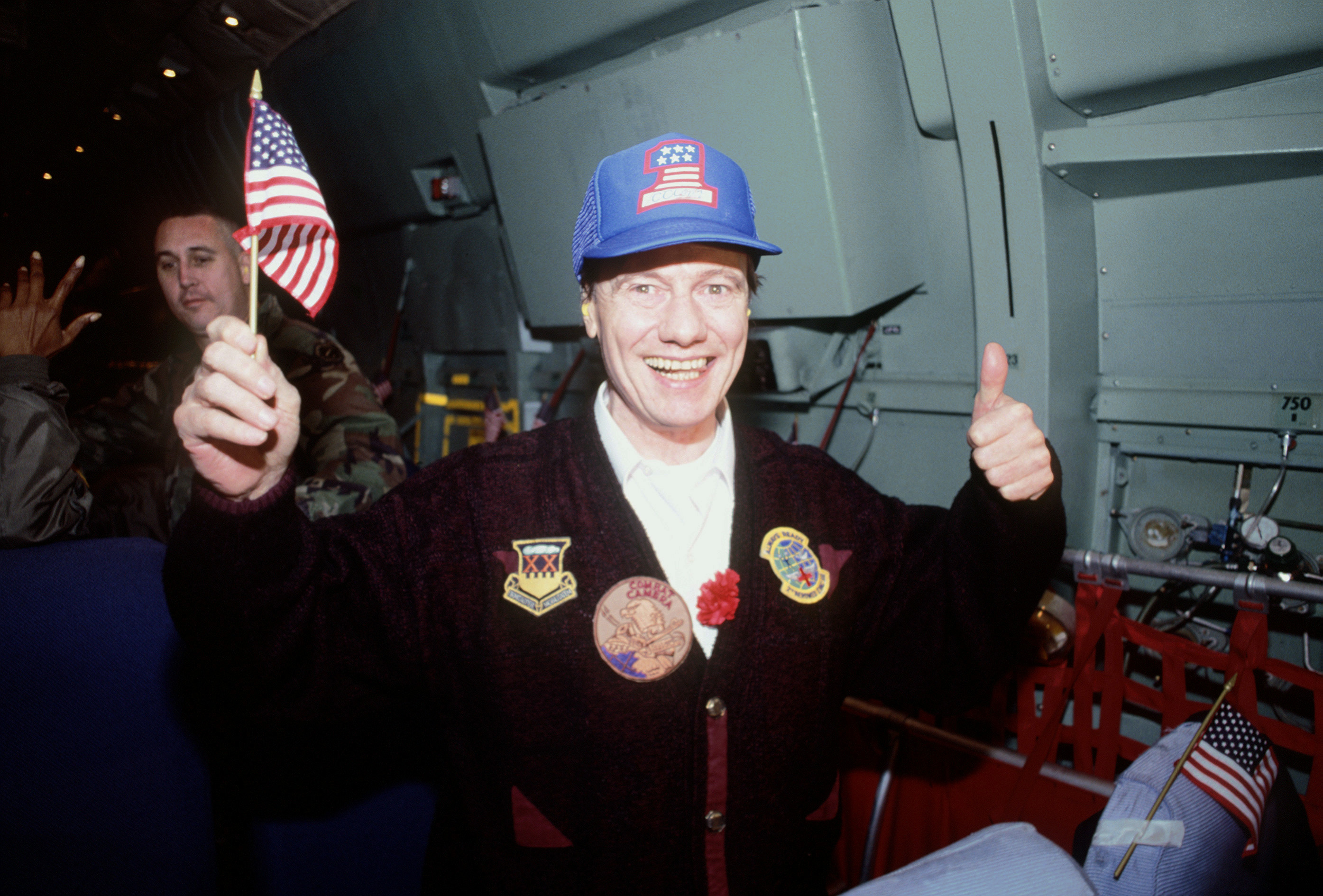
- Thomas Sutherland after his release, in November 1991
- Born: May 3, 1931; Falkirk, Scotland, United Kingdom
- Died: July 22, 2016 (aged 85); Fort Collins, Colorado
- Education: University of Glasgow; Iowa State University

Thomas Sutherland (May 3, 1931 – July 22, 2016), Dean of Agriculture at the American University of Beirut in Lebanon, was kidnapped by Islamic Jihad members near his Beirut home on June 9, 1985. He was released on November 18, 1991, at the same time as Terry Waite, having been held hostage for 2,353 days, nearly six and a half years.

== Early life ==
Born in Falkirk, Scotland on May 3, 1931, Sutherland was signed as a 17-year-old by Rangers F.C. Sutherland obtained a BSc in Agriculture from the University of Glasgow, and moved to the United States in the 1950s. He received a master's degree and PhD in animal breeding from Iowa State University, then taught animal science at Colorado State University for 26 years.

== Abduction ==
In 1983, Sutherland moved to Beirut to take up a three-year term as dean of the faculty of agriculture and food science at the American University in Beirut. Despite the assassination of University President Malcolm H. Kerr and the kidnapping of Professor Frank Reiger in 1984, and repeated warnings from the State Department imploring him to leave Lebanon, Sutherland chose to remain at the University. Two weeks after David P. Jacobsen was abducted, Sutherland was also kidnapped while using the limousine of University President Calvin Plimpton. Upon his release in 1991, Sutherland claimed that the kidnappers mistook him for Plimpton.

== Aftermath ==
He was the second-longest held captive after Terry Anderson. His memories of the experience were published in a book co-authored by his wife Jean, At Your Own Risk (ISBN 1555912559). He claims to have attempted suicide a number of times and to have spent a substantial amount of time in solitary confinement.

In June 2001, the Sutherland family won a $323 million verdict in a lawsuit against the frozen assets of the government of Iran, because of evidence that Iran had directed terrorists to kidnap Americans in Lebanon. In accordance with Section 2002 of the Victims of Trafficking and Violence Protection Act of 2000, Pub. L. 106–386 (text) (PDF), Sutherland and his family received $35,041,877.36 (including interest) and the lien for the rest of the original settlement is now held by the US Government.

Sutherland died on July 22, 2016, in Fort Collins, Colorado, aged 85.

== See also ==
- Lebanon hostage crisis
- List of kidnappings
- List of solved missing person cases: 1950–1999
