= Jill Morrell =

British journalist and charity worker (born 1957)

- Born: 1957 (age 68–69)
- Education: University of Hull
- Occupations: Charity worker, former journalist
- Organizations: Friends of John McCarthy; Cancerbackup; British Lung Foundation
- Notable work: Some Other Rainbow (1993)
- Partner: John McCarthy (until 1994)

Jill Morrell (born 1957) is a British charity worker and former journalist. She came to the public eye following the kidnapping of her boyfriend John McCarthy, in 1985. Morrell was a tireless and effective campaigner for McCarthy's release from captors who held him in Lebanon for more than five years.

Morrell was raised in Yorkshire, and is a graduate of the University of Hull. She met McCarthy while they were both working as journalists. They had been in a relationship for only a short time prior to McCarthy's abduction. She kept McCarthy's name in the public domain with a campaign to free him, called "Friends of John McCarthy" (FOJM). In 2009, she commented "I have found it hard to view the Friends of John McCarthy campaign with any real sense of personal achievement."

After McCarthy's release on 8 August 1991, the couple remained together until 1994, and wrote a joint memoir, Some Other Rainbow, but they parted amicably. McCarthy subsequently met BBC photographer Anna Ottewill, and they married in April 1999.

Morrell worked for charity Cancerbackup (now Macmillan Cancer Support) as their Policy and Public Affairs Manager. She later held the role of Head of Public Affairs with the British Lung Foundation.

== Published works ==
- Jointly with John McCarthy (1993). Some Other Rainbow. Bantam Press ISBN 9780593027295
