= Tribes with Flags =

"Tribes With Flags" is part of a phrase attributed to Tahseen Bashir, an Egyptian diplomat (April 1925 – June 11, 2002). Regarding his belief in the centrality of Egypt within the Middle East he opined: "Egypt is the only nation-state in the Arab world; the rest are just tribes with flags".

Another version of Mr. Bashir's ‘flag’ quip is:

'When the chips are down, there is only one real place in the entire area – Egypt', a Cairo diplomat once declared. 'All the rest – forgive me – are tribes with flags'.

Two book titles based on this quote are Tribes With Flags: A Dangerous Passage Through the Chaos of the Middle East (Apr. 1990) and Tribes With Flags: A Journey Curtailed (1992), both by Charles Glass.
