= Hardcover Mysteries (TV series) =

- Genre: True crime
- Narrated by: Jay O. Sanders
- Country of origin: United States
- Original language: English
- No. of seasons: 1
- No. of episodes: 8

Production
- Executive producers: Robert Kirk; Rob Lihani
- Producers: David Cargill; David Connelly; Joe Peicott; Charlie Cook; Nora Donaghy
- Running time: 60 minutes

Original release
- Network: ID
- Release: October 11 – November 29, 2010

Hardcover Mysteries is an American true crime television series that airs on the Investigation Discovery network. Debuting on October 11, 2010, Hardcover Mysteries is produced in conjunction with Digital Ranch Productions, Inc.

== Synopsis ==
The series "travels inside the minds of America's most popular novelists to explore the crossover from fact to fiction." Best-selling crime fiction writers—including David Baldacci, Sandra Brown, and Kathy Reichs—host each episode, telling the story of a real life crime that helped inspire their fiction.

The show is a mix of interviews, crime scene photographs, and cinematic reenactments. A New York Post review awarded the documentary series 3-out-of-4 stars.

== Episodes ==
- "David Baldacci" - In 1964, D.C. socialite Mary Meyer was murdered. The revelation of Mary's diary, which detailed an affair with President Kennedy, leads many to conspiracy theories and became the partial basis for Baldacci's best-seller, Absolute Power.
- "Lisa Scottoline" - Detectives investigating the homicide of a 15-year-old girl uncover a shocking murder-for-hire scheme plotted by the victim herself. Lisa Scottoline, whose thrillers often explore family relationships, untangles the web of this family triangle.
- "Sandra Brown" - The body of a young man is found brutally murdered in East Texas. Investigators believe a local gang with a hateful agenda is behind the crime. Sandra Brown offers insight into this landmark hate-crime case, which inspired her book, The Witness.
- "Linda Fairstein" - A vast investigation into the disappearance of millionaire Manhattan socialite Irene Silverman uncovers two prime suspects, a mother-and-son killing team. Linda Fairstein provides a behind-the-scenes account of the police investigation.
- "Sara Paretsky" - Carmin Ross is found stabbed to death in her Lawrence, KS home. This case captured novelist Sara Paretsky's attention because of how investigators methodically unraveled the suspect's carefully crafted story.
- "Harlan Coben" - Harlan Coben's two New York Times #1 bestsellers, Long Lost and Caught feature girls who disappear and a community's quest for answers — themes that are found in the true story of Brianna Denison's abduction and the questions that echoed as a result in the community of Reno, Nevada.
- "Kathy Reichs" - When freelance writer Louise Ellis disappears on a routine weekend getaway, investigators narrow in on two key suspects: her new husband and her ex-boyfriend. Now a critically acclaimed best-selling author, Dr. Kathy Reichs, recounts her real-life involvement as forensic anthropologist in one of the most sensational homicide investigations in Canadian history.
- "Joseph Wambaugh" - Joseph Wambaugh traces the landmark case that was subject of his bestseller The Blooding. When two English girls are murdered in the small community of Leicester, investigators use a new technique called DNA fingerprinting to bring a serial killer to justice.
