= Jerry Levin (journalist) =

American journalist (1932–2020)

- Born: Jeremy Isadore Levin; March 20, 1932; Detroit, Michigan, U.S.
- Died: February 6, 2020 (aged 87)
- Education: Northwestern University
- Occupation: Journalist
- Spouse: Lucile Hare
- Children: 6

Jeremy Isadore "Jerry" Levin (March 20, 1932 – February 6, 2020) was an American television journalist. He wrote on nonviolence, with an emphasis on the Middle East and in particular Palestine and Israel.

== Life and career ==
In 1984, while working for CNN, he was kidnapped and held hostage by Hezbollah. He escaped after eleven and a half months in captivity due to the nonviolent behind-the-scene efforts of friends and colleagues organized by his wife, Sis Levin. Of Jewish birth, Levin converted to Christianity during his captivity.

In 1991, his story was made into the television film Held Hostage. The film stars David Dukes as Levin.

He worked with several violence reduction organizations in the West Bank and Gaza, including Christian Peacemaker Teams, and with nonviolent peace and nonviolent justice organizations in the U.S.

In April 2009 he and his wife were recognized by the Dalai Lama as one of 2009's "Unsung Heroes of Compassion".

== Personal life ==
Levin was born in Detroit in 1932. He attended Northwestern University and was in the United States Navy. He and his wife, Lucile "Sis" Levin (née Hare) had six children. Levin lived in Birmingham, Alabama at the end of his life, and died on February 6, 2020, at the age of 87.

== Books ==
- Jerry Levin. Reflections on My First Noël. (Pasadena: Hope Publishing, 2002). ISBN 978-1-932717-06-8.
- Jerry Levin. West Bank Diary: Middle East Violence as Reported by a Former American Hostage. (Pasadena: Hope Publishing, 2005). ISBN 978-1-932717-03-7.
