= Benjamin Weir =

American missionary and hostage (1923–2016)

- Born: December 20, 1923; U.S.
- Died: October 14, 2016 (aged 92); Oakland, California, U.S.
- Occupation: Christian missionary
- Known for: Being kidnapped in Lebanon in 1984

Benjamin Weir (December 20, 1923 – October 14, 2016) was an American hostage in Lebanon in 1984–85.

== Background ==
Born on December 20, 1923, Weir, who with his wife Carol served as missionaries in Lebanon with the Presbyterian Church (U.S.A.) for nearly 30 years, was kidnapped off the streets of Beirut in May 1984. The kidnapping was done by an Islamic fundamentalist group, Islamic Jihad, that later evolved into Hezbollah. He was freed 16 months later in exchange for US anti-tank weapons, as part of the Iran-Contra Affair. Shortly thereafter he was elected moderator of the 1986 General Assembly of the Presbyterian Church, the highest elected office in that denomination.

He remained one of the world's most respected voices for peace and reconciliation in the Middle East for the next 30 years.

The book Hostage Bound Hostage Free tells the story of his captivity from his perspective as well as his wife's.

While a student at the University of California, Berkeley, Weir was initiated into the Beta chapter of Alpha Gamma Omega, a Christ-centered fraternity. Later he attended Princeton Theological Seminary.

Weir died on October 14, 2016, in Oakland, California.

== See also ==
- List of kidnappings
- List of solved missing person cases: 1950–1999

Religious titles
| Preceded by Elder William H. Wilson | Moderator of the 198th General Assembly of the Presbyterian Church (USA); 1986–1987 | Succeeded by Elder Isabel W. Rogers |
