= List of unsolved murders (1980–1999) =

This list of unsolved murders includes notable cases where victims have been murdered under unknown circumstances. Cold cases included.

== 1980–1984 ==
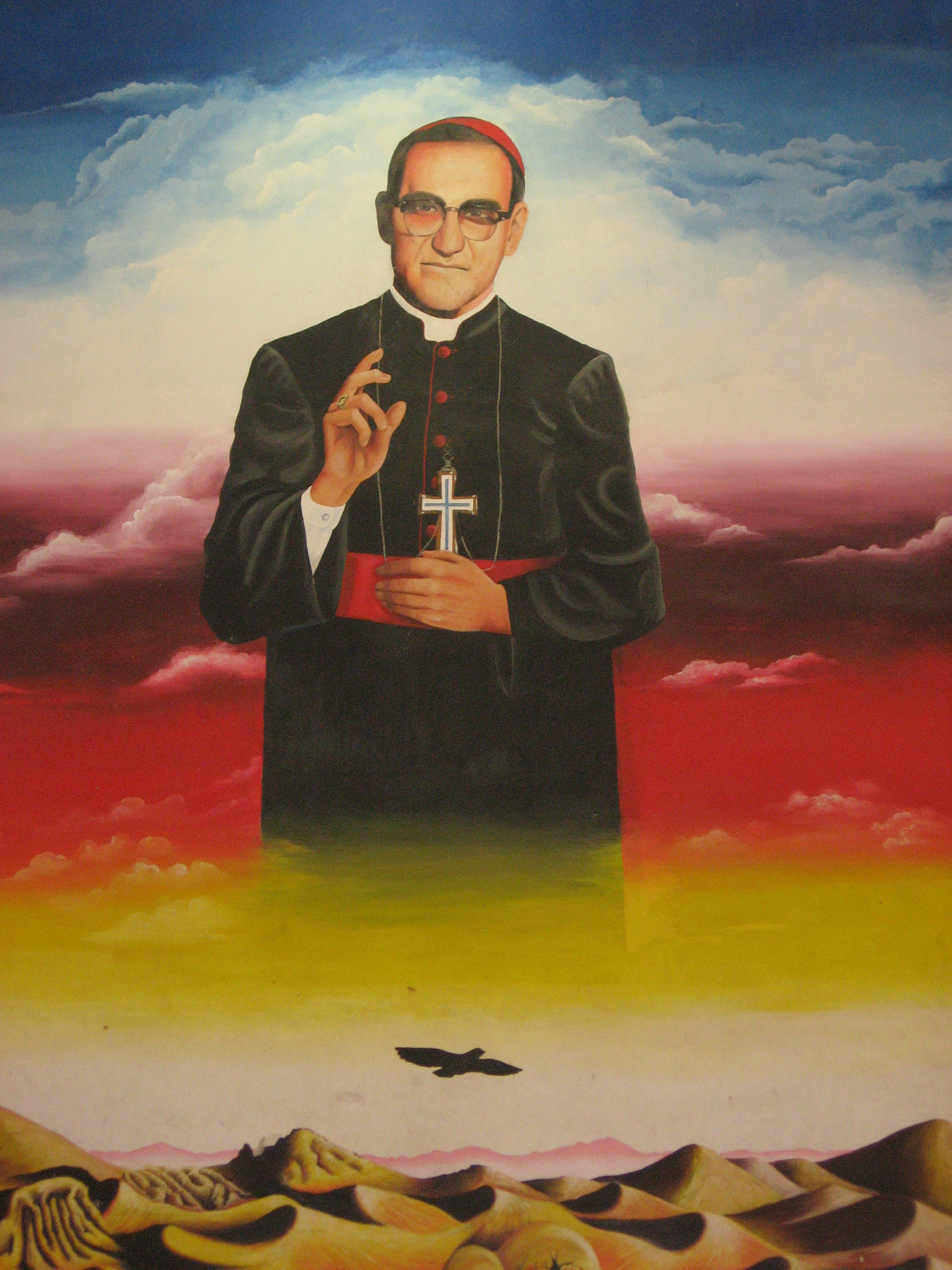
Pastel drawing of Óscar Romero, murdered Archbishop

- Jeannie Mills (39) was an early defector from the Peoples Temple along with her husband and teenage daughter, who were all murdered on 26 February 1980 in their Berkeley, California homes. The murder is still unsolved.
- Angelo Bruno (69), a Philadelphia mob boss, was killed by a shotgun blast to the back of his head as he sat in his car in front of his South Philadelphia house on 21 March 1980. Antonio Caponigro, one of Bruno's underlings, is believed to have ordered the killing over a drug dispute; since the murder had not been sanctioned by the Commission, Caponigro himself was reputedly killed on its orders within a month. However, no suspects have ever been identified as having actually shot Bruno.
- Óscar Romero, the fourth Archbishop of San Salvador, El Salvador, was killed by a shot to the heart on 24 March 1980, while celebrating Mass at a small chapel located in a hospital. It is believed but was never proven that the assassins were members of Salvadoran death squads. During the funeral a bomb exploded in Plaza Barrios fronting San Salvador Cathedral and shots were fired. Many people were killed during the subsequent mass panic. Romero was later canonised as a saint in 2018 by Pope Francis.
- Dorothy Jane Scott (32) disappeared on 28 May 1980 in Anaheim, California after heading to pick up a colleague who had been discharged from the hospital following treatment for a spider bite. Her car was found burnt out in an alleyway 10 miles (16 km) from the hospital the following morning, and her decomposed remains were discovered in August 1984. Her murderer and cause of death remain unknown, but police believe an unidentified male who stalked Scott with harassing phone calls prior to her disappearance and subsequent murder is the likely suspect.
- Charles Miller (41), the War saxophonist who co-wrote and sang their hit "Low Rider", was killed on 4 June 1980 during a robbery in Los Angeles, California. No suspects have ever been identified.
- The explosion that killed all 81 on board Itavia Flight 870 near the Italian island of Ustica on 27 June 1980 has been variously attributed to a bomb or a missile strike. Whatever the cause, the investigations have been criticized as ineffective, and no culprits identified. There has also been a series of suspicious deaths, murders or suicides among people involved in or investigating the case, further raising suspicion of a conspiracy.
- Troy Leon Gregg (32), the first condemned individual whose death sentence was upheld by the United States Supreme Court after the Furman v. Georgia ruling invalidated all previously enacted death penalty laws in the United States, escaped from Georgia State Prison in Reidsville, Georgia along with three other death row inmates and convicted murderers on 29 July 1980. Gregg's body was found in the Catawba River later that night; he had died as a result of suffocation. One theory suggests that Gregg was killed in a biker bar in North Carolina after attempting to assault a waitress. Another theory suggests that Gregg was murdered after getting into an argument with one of his fellow escapees, Timothy McCorquodale, and James Cecil Horne, a member of the Outlaws Motorcycle Club. Horne was initially charged with Gregg's murder, with William Flamont being charged as an accessory to the crime. All charges against Horne and Flamont were later dropped due to lack of evidence.
- Tammy Terrell, a formerly unidentified seventeen-year-old, was discovered on 5 October 1980, in Henderson, Nevada. Authorities believe she may have been the victim of human trafficking.
- Giorgio Agatino Giamonna (25) and Antonio Galatola (15) were two young homosexual males discovered deceased in Giarre, Italy on 31 October 1980. Both had been shot in the head and were discovered holding hands. The perpetrator of the murders was never identified, but is believed to have been the 13-year-old nephew of one of the victims. The deaths of Giamonna and Galatola ultimately led to the widespread recognition of homophobia among the Italian public and the strengthening and recognition of Italian gay rights movements.
- The decomposing remains of Dean and Tina Clouse were found outside of Houston, Texas in January 1981, but were not identified until 2021. Their infant daughter, Holly Marie, was not found with their bodies, and was later located alive in Oklahoma in 2022. It was discovered that Holly Marie had been abandoned at a church in Arizona by members of an unknown Jesus freak cult, who are now considered the main suspects in the murders of Dean and Tina.
- Frank Sindone (52), another Philadelphia mobster believed to have been involved in the Angelo Bruno assassination, was found dead on 29 October 1980 with three gunshot wounds in the back of his head in a South Philadelphia alley. His death is believed to have been ordered by the Commission as punishment for the unsanctioned killing of Bruno, but no suspects have ever been identified.

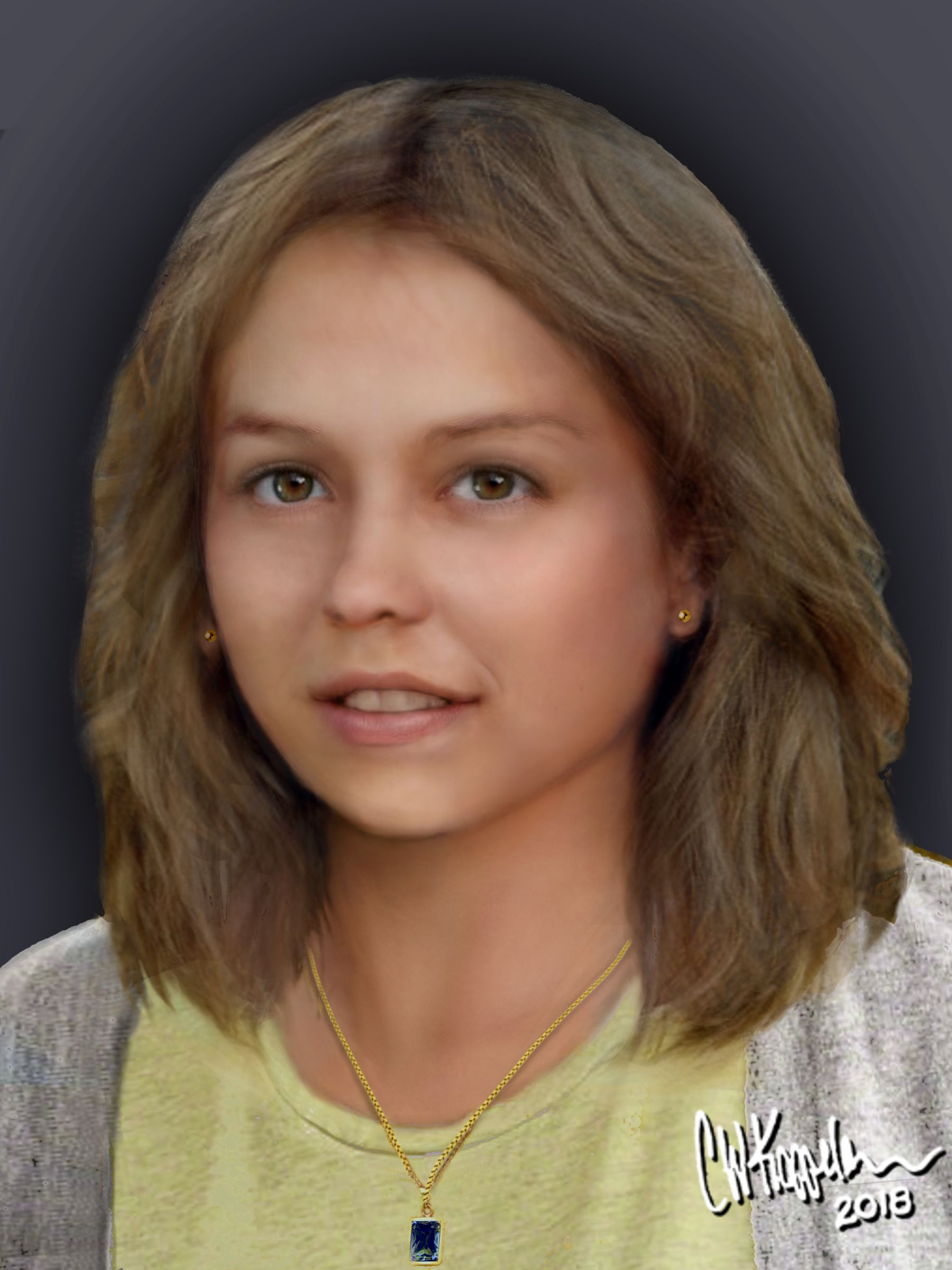
Forensic facial reconstruction of Sherri Jarvis created prior to her 2021 identification

- Sherri Jarvis is a formerly unidentified 14-year-old girl whose body was found on 1 November 1980, in Huntsville, Texas, United States. A witness reported a possible runaway matching her description seen asking for directions to a prison unit (which she never arrived at). Jarvis was sexually assaulted before being beaten and killed by strangulation.
- Goh Beng Choo, an eight-year-old girl whose body was found in a village in Bukit Batok, Singapore on 19 November 1980. She had died of a ruptured liver resulting from blows to her abdomen, and had been sexually assaulted before her death.
- Carol Cole (17) was discovered stabbed to death in Bellevue, Louisiana in January 1981, after her 1980 disappearance. Her body was identified in February 2015. The man who found her, now in prison for killing his wife's close friend, is considered a person of interest.
- Sebastian Russo (56), a primary care physician from Baltimore, Maryland, was shot and killed in his office on the evening of 27 February 1981. The only clues indicated that a patient and possibly an accomplice targeted him for his supply of prescription drugs. No suspects have ever been identified.
- Philip Testa (56), known as "The Chicken Man", was killed when a nail bomb exploded under his porch as he stepped into his Philadelphia house on 15 March 1981, the second local mob boss to be assassinated within a year. At the time he and several associates were under federal indictment for their activities; Testa's killing sparked a four-year war for control that left 30 other mobsters dead. Two of Testa's underbosses have been described as responsible; however, no actual suspects have ever been named.
- The Shinjuku–Kabukicho Love Hotel murders are the murders of three young Japanese females that took place on three different occasions on 19 March 1981, on 25 April 1981, and on 14 June 1981, in Tokyo at nighttime at love hotels. The three murders are believed to have been committed by the same person who is believed to be a male, who has never been identified or captured.
- Thor Nis Christiansen (23) was a Danish-American serial killer from Solvang, California. He committed his first three murders in late 1976 and early 1977, killing young women of similar appearance from nearby Isla Vista. His crimes motivated large demonstrations opposed to violence against women, and in favor of better transportation for the young people residing in Isla Vista. On 30 March 1981, Christiansen died after being stabbed in the exercise yard at Folsom State Prison. His killer was not identified.
- The Keddie murders, in which four people were found dead in Keddie, California on 11 April (and possibly into 12 April) 1981.
- Brenda Gerow (21) was found murdered in early April 1981 in Tucson, Arizona. Her body remained unidentified until 2015 after a photograph of her was found in a convicted killer's possession and led police to believe she was the unidentified victim, based on a resemblance to a facial reconstruction. Gerow was subsequently identified to be the girl in the picture and later confirmed to be the victim through DNA tests. The man who possessed her photograph is considered a person of interest and her murder remains unsolved.
- Marcia King (21), who had been nicknamed "Buckskin Girl" prior to her identification in 2018, was found in Troy, Ohio on 23 April 1981. She had been beaten and strangled to death.
- Mostafa Chamran (48) was an Iranian physicist, politician, commander and guerrilla fighter who was killed on 21 June 1981 in Dehlavieh, during the Iran–Iraq War. The mystery behind his murder remains largely unsolved.
- Raymond Nels Nelson (59) was Administrative Assistant to Senator Claiborne Pell and former bureau chief of The Providence Journal, Rhode Island. He was found bludgeoned to death with a typewriter in his Washington, D.C. apartment on 1 June 1981.
- The Wonderland murders are four unsolved murders that occurred in Los Angeles on 1 July 1981. It is assumed that six people were targeted to be killed in the known drug house of the Wonderland Gang, five were present, and four of those five died from extensive blunt-force trauma injuries: Billy DeVerell, Ron Launius, Joy Miller and Barbara Richardson. Launius' wife, Susan Launius, survived the attack. The attack was allegedly masterminded by organized crime figure and nightclub owner Eddie Nash. He, his henchman Gregory DeWitt Diles, and porn star John Holmes were at various times arrested, tried, and acquitted for their involvement in the murders.
- Ken McElroy (47), long considered the "town bully" of Skidmore, Missouri, was shot dead while in the cab of his pickup truck on 10 July 1981. None of the 46 potential witnesses to the crime have ever come forward to identify a suspect.
- Vishal Mehrotra (8) was abducted from Putney, South London on 29 July 1981. Vishal's partial remains were discovered 25 February 1982, on an isolated farm in Sussex. His murder remains unsolved.
- Kazumi Miura (28), a Japanese citizen, was shot in the head by a sniper on 18 November 1981 while visiting Los Angeles with her husband Kazuyoshi Miura. She died in 1982 after spending a year in a coma. The sniper was never identified, while Kazuyoshi was acquitted in Japan of orchestrating the crime and died by suicide before he could stand trial in the United States.
- The Setiabudi 13 case refers to an unidentified male who was murdered, mutilated, and discovered dead on the sidewalk of Jalan Jenderal Sudirman, Setiabudi, South Jakarta on 23 November 1981. The case has now gone cold and his killer is unknown.
- Zoya Fyodorova (73) was a Russian film star who had an affair with American Navy captain Jackson Tate in 1945 and bore a child, Victoria Fyodorova, in January 1946. Having rejected the advances of NKVD police head Lavrentiy Beria, the affair was exposed resulting, initially, in a death sentence later reprieved to work camp imprisonment in Siberia; she was released after eight years. She was murdered in her Moscow apartment on 11 December 1981. The murder remains unsolved.
- Dana Bradley (14) disappeared while hitchhiking in St. John's, Newfoundland and Labrador on 14 December 1981. Her body was found four days later in a wooded area south of St. John's. An intense and highly publicized investigation followed, and in 1986 a man confessed to her murder, but later recanted. As of 2018, the case remains open and unsolved.
- Jorge Sangumba (37–38) served as the Foreign Minister of UNITA during the Angolan War of Independence. It is believed that Jonas Savimbi, leader of UNITA, allegedly ordered Sangumba's assassination along with several other potential rivals for leadership of UNITA during the Angolan Civil War in 1982. The murder has been investigated, but nothing has been found out and remains unsolved.
- Marcel Francisci (62), a French member of the Union Corse criminal organization who created the French Connection drug pipeline, was shot fatally as he walked to his car from his Paris apartment on 16 January 1982. No suspects have ever been identified.
- Andrea Buchanan (26) was an American professional female tennis player who was shot and later died on 28 January 1982 in the Los Angeles fish market, where she worked. Her murder remains unsolved.
- Carolyn Eaton (17), formerly known as Valentine Sally, was an unidentified female discovered along I-40 in Arizona on 14 February 1982. She had likely been seen at a truck stop with an older male early in the morning on 4 February and had been murdered soon after. No suspects have ever been identified, but the case is treated as a homicide.
- The severed head and dismembered remains of Nava Elimelech (11) were found in plastic bags at the beaches in Herzliya and Tel Baruch, Israel on 20 March 1982. She had likely been murdered in her hometown of Bat Yam that same day. Despite extensive searches and several arrests, the murderer remains unknown.
- Jim Bradley (29) was an American basketball player from East Chicago, Indiana who was shot dead on 20 February 1982 in Portland, Oregon. Whoever killed him is unknown, but it is known to be drug related.
- Seventeen Hindu monks and nuns were killed and subsequently burned by a mob in the Bijon Setu massacre, possibly over rumours of child-trafficking. No arrests were ever made.
- Rusty Day (36) was an American singer who was fatally shot at his home on 3 June 1982. His son, his dog, and Garth McRae were also fatally shot during the same attack. The murder officially remains unsolved, although the Seminole County Sheriff's Office believes the victims may have known the perpetrator, and that the killings may have been drug-related.
- Roberto Calvi (62), CEO of Banco Ambrosiano, was found hanged under Blackfriars Bridge in London on 17 June 1982. Initially considered a suicide, authorities later changed their minds and investigated it as a homicide. An Italian court acquitted five defendants in 2009; charges against a sixth defendant were later dropped.
- Dawn Olanick (17), who was formerly known as "Princess Doe", was a teenage girl from West Babylon, New York who went missing on 24 June 1982 and was found dead on 15 July 1982 in Cedar Ridge Cemetery in Blairstown, New Jersey after being murdered. Her murder remains unsolved.
- Thomas Oscar Freeman (35) was murdered sometime in July 1982 by an unidentified individual by multiple gunshots. His decomposing body was found in a shallow grave on 30 October 1982. In February 2022, it was revealed that Freeman himself had murdered 32-year-old Lee Rotatori on 25 June 1982, by stabbing her in the heart. Authorities believe the two murders are connected.
- The body of a strangled teenage girl, found on 1 July 1982 outside Baytown, Texas, remained unidentified for 32 years. In 2014, the corpse's DNA was matched to Michelle Garvey (15), a runaway from Connecticut. The investigation is ongoing.
- Rachael Runyan (3) was abducted from a park near her home in Sunset, Utah on 26 August 1982. Her body was found three weeks later in a creek approximately 50 miles (80 km) away. Her murder remains unsolved.
- The bodies of seven people were found on board the remains of the fishing vessel Investor after it burned off the coast of Craig, Alaska, on 7 September 1982; a coroner's jury found that an eighth known to have been on board died as well even though their remains were not found, and that the fire had been set. Two years later, police arrested a former crewman and charged him with murder and arson. After the first trial ended in a hung jury, he was acquitted in 1988. No other suspects have ever been named.
- Kristina Diane Nelson (21) and her stepsister, Jacqueline Ann "Brandy" Miller (18), were found dead in a rural area near Kendrick, Idaho. Nelson and Miller had vanished from Lewiston, Idaho on 12 September 1982. Stephen Pearsall (35), who knew the sisters and disappeared the same night, was never located and may also have been killed. Police link their deaths with a cluster of other disappearances and murders occurring in the Lewiston–Clarkston metropolitan area between 1979 and 1982.
- The body of Alisha Heinrich was discovered on 5 December 1982, in the Escatawpa River in Moss Point, Mississippi. The child would remain unidentified for nearly 38 years; she had disappeared alongside her mother, Gwendolyn Clemons, about eleven days before. Clemons' remains have never been recovered.
- The FBI continues to investigate the Chicago Tylenol murders, which took place in late 1982, but has not identified any suspects.
- On 20 January 1983, three days before he was to be sentenced for attempting to bribe a U.S. Senator, Allen Dorfman (60), an insurance agency owner, and close associate of Jimmy Hoffa believed to have ties to the Chicago Outfit, was shot to death in a Lincolnwood, Illinois, hotel parking lot. While it is believed he was killed by former associates to prevent him from offering information about them in exchange for a reduced sentence, no suspects have ever been named.
- Sheila Anderson (27) was run over and killed on the promenade at Gypsy Brae in Edinburgh on 7 February 1983. Anderson, a sex worker, was in the habit of standing in front of clients' cars if they did not pay her to stop them from leaving, and it is suspected that her killer may have run her over after such a confrontation.
- St. Louis Jane Doe is the name given to an unidentified girl who was found murdered in an abandoned house on 28 February 1983 in St. Louis, Missouri. She has also been nicknamed Hope and the Little Jane Doe. The victim was estimated to be between eight and eleven when she was murdered, and is believed to have been killed by strangulation. She was raped and decapitated. The brutality of the crime has led to national attention.
- Peter Ivers, television host and musician, was found bludgeoned to death in his Los Angeles apartment on 3 March 1983. The Los Angeles Police Department (LAPD) failed to properly secure the crime scene and the murder was never solved, although on the basis of new information found in the book In Heaven Everything Is Fine: The Unsolved Life of Peter Ivers and the Lost History of New Wave Theatre (2008) by Josh Frank and Charlie Buckholtz, the LAPD has reopened their investigation into Ivers' death.
- Brian Stack (47) was an Irish chief prison officer at Portlaoise Prison, who on 25 March 1983 was shot in the neck by unknown members of the Provisional IRA and died a year and six months later from pneumonia, after he was taken to the hospital. His murder remains unsolved.
- Issam Sartawi (48), a Palestine Liberation Organization peace negotiator, was shot and killed on 10 April 1983 in the lobby of a Portuguese hotel while attending that year's Socialist International conference. The Abu Nidal organization later claimed responsibility, but no arrests have ever been made.
- Nancy Argentino (23), the girlfriend and then-mistress of professional wrestler Jimmy Snuka, died on 10 May 1983 after being attacked in the hotel room where the two were staying. Thirty-two years later, Snuka was indicted and arrested in September 2015 on third-degree murder and involuntary manslaughter charges in relation to Argentino's death. Snuka pleaded not guilty, but was ultimately found unfit to stand trial in June 2016 due to being diagnosed with dementia. As his health declined, the charges were dismissed on 3 January 2017, and he died twelve days later from stomach cancer.
- Prithipal Singh (51), an Indian man who played field hockey, was shot dead on 20 May 1983 at the Punjab Agricultural University located in Ludhiana, and it is disputed who the killers were.
- Dursun Aksoy (39), an administrative attaché at the Turkish embassy in Brussels, Belgium, was starting his car on Avenue Franklin Roosevelt 14 July 1983 when a man walked up to him and shot him twice in the head; he died almost instantly. Two militant Armenian groups claimed responsibility, but no one has ever been charged. The murder remains unsolved.
- Denise "Dee Dee" Walker (25), a single mother, was murdered in an execution-style shooting at a crack house in Los Angeles on 9 August 1983, for which Willie Earl Green was convicted for the murder. 25 years later, however, subsequent investigations exonerated Green, citing an undue focus on him as a suspect due to a prior relation with the victim; the case has since remained unsolved.
- George Murdoch (58), a taxi driver from Aberdeen, was strangled to death with cheese wire on 29 September 1983 by a passenger who then stole his wallet. The killer's DNA was recovered in 2023, but could not be matched to a suspect.
- Two German tourists, Andrea Scherpf (23) and Bernd Göricke (27), were shot to death in Chetwynd, British Columbia on 3 October 1983 by the unidentified driver of a car that had picked the two of them up. Two separate suspects were named, including one who stood trial for the crime three times, but both were cleared by DNA evidence.
- On October 3, 1983, the body of Douglas J. Parent was found in his apartment above the Waldoboro Newsstand which he operated and owned in Waldoboro, Maine. At the time of his death, there was confusion as to whether Parent had been killed or died by accident due to a fall. It was finally determined that Parent had been strangled to death. The Maine Unsolved Homicide Unit lists Parent's death as one of 70 unsolved murders it is still currently investigating in the state.
- Heide Marie Villarreal-Fye (25), a cocktail waitress, was last seen alive on 10 October 1983 at a convenience store located off West Main Street and Hobbs in League City, Texas. Heidi's remains were discovered on 4 April 1984 after a dog brought her skull to a nearby house in Calder Field on the 3000 block of Calder Road near League City. The medical examiner determined that Heidi had broken ribs and had been beaten with a club; she is believed to have died from blunt force trauma to the head.
- Paul Volpe (56), a Canadian mobster, was murdered on 13 November 1983 and found dead the next day in the trunk of his wife's BMW at Toronto Pearson International Airport; Pietro Scarcella is said to have been the last person to see Volpe alive before his unsolved murder. Johnny Papalia has also been linked with Volpe's death, but no charges were laid.
- Tracy Marie Neef (7) was abducted near her school in Thornton, Colorado on 16 March 1984, and later found murdered with signs of molestation and asphyxiation. Despite an extensive investigation and physical evidence collected at the scene, and several persons of interest in subsequent years, police were unable to identify or indict a specific suspect. In addition to efforts to solve the case itself, authorities hope that findings in the Tracy Neef case may also lead to significant information about two other cold murder cases—Lacey Ruff, and particularly that of JonBenet Ramsey—given observations of potential links in not only the geography but also victim profile, modus operandi, materials used in commission of the crimes and other common features; all three crimes involving a similar manner of sexual assault and murder, all three targeting preteen girls of similar age and ethnic background in a similar frame of time and location, and all three involving the use of cords, ropes, or other ligatures, with the possibility of a break in any one case leading to a common perpetrator and conviction for all three.
- Ruth Waymire (24) was an American female murder victim who went missing from Spokane, Washington in 1984, and whose partial remains were found on 20 June 1984. Her skull was found in Spokane in 1998, but her killer remains unknown.
- Karl Brugger (41) was a German foreign correspondent for the ARD network, and an author best known for his book The Chronicle of Akakor (about the alleged lost city of Akakor) that was published in 1976. Brugger was shot down in Rio de Janeiro on 3 January 1984, after being shot several times while walking with his friend Ulrich Encke at Ipanema beach. Neither his killer, nor the motive for his killing, is known.
- On the morning of 14 April 1984, the body of a male infant, its neck broken and repeatedly stabbed, was found on the beach at Cahersiveen in Ireland's County Kerry. Later named Baby John, the police investigation became known as the Kerry Babies case after it led to a young woman in nearby Abbeydorney who was mistakenly charged with the crime along with her family. While she had in fact hidden the corpse of a baby she gave birth to who died of undetermined causes shortly afterwards, she was found to have no connection to the Cahirseveen baby, whose identity and killer remain unknown.
- Gérard Lebovici (51), a French film producer, was found in his car on 7 March 1984 in a Paris parking garage. He had been shot several times two days earlier. No suspects have ever been identified.
- Hukum Singh (32), who was also known as "Tutu Bana", was found murdered on 17 April 1984 after being hacked to death by someone who had used Singh's own sword.
- Vernon County Jane Doe was an unidentified victim found on 4 May 1984, near Westby, Wisconsin. Her hands were severed and never found.
- Catrine da Costa was a Swedish sex worker. Parts of her dismembered body were found just outside Stockholm, in Solna, during the summer of 1984. Her murder remains unsolved.
- Ong King Hock (26), a Singaporean lorry driver, was held hostage by armed robber and gunman Khor Kok Soon, who forced Ong to help him escape after he engaged in a gunfight with police officers at Singapore's Shenton Way on 30 July 1984. Afterwards, Ong was found dead inside his abandoned lorry at Teo Hong Road, with a gaping bullet wound on the right side of his neck. Ong's death was ruled as murder in the coroner's verdict in 1998, with Khor, who escaped to Malaysia, being the prime suspect. Although Khor was arrested in 2003 and later sentenced to death for discharging his firearm under the Arms Offences Act, he was never brought to trial for Ong's murder, as the prosecution had withdrawn the preliminary murder charge against Khor before he was hanged.
- The strangled bodies of Margaret Tapp (35) and her daughter Seana (9) were found at their home in Melbourne's Ferntree Gully neighborhood on 7 August 1984; Seana had been sexually assaulted. Two suspects were cleared after their DNA did not match that left at the scene; the case was reopened in the 2010s.
- Lenny Breau (42) was a music teacher and guitarist. His body was found floating in the swimming pool at his Los Angeles apartment complex on 12 August 1984; the coroner's office found that he had been strangled. While his wife was suspected, she was never charged, and no one else has been.
- After an anonymous caller to the house of Grégory Villemin (4), of Lépanges-sur-Vologne, France, told his family on 16 October 1984 that he had taken the boy (who had been playing unsupervised in front of the house), a search found Grégory's body, bound and gagged, in the Vologne River 7 km (4.3 mi) away, where he had apparently been drowned; however, the autopsy suggested the drowning had occurred in a different body of water. This began a case that has continued to receive extensive national media attention. An anonymous note suggesting the writer had killed the boy led to the arrest of Bernard Laroche, a Villemin cousin, who was now suspected of having written a long string of threatening anonymous letters to members of the family, socially and economically prominent in that area of the Vosges. Grégory's father, Jean-Marie, shot and killed Laroche several months later; he would serve several years in prison as a result. Handwriting experts then linked Grégory's mother to the notes; she was charged with the murders but, after seven years and two trials, acquitted. Efforts to recover DNA from the principal evidence in the early 21st century failed; but in 2017, three of Grégory's other relatives were charged, although police say they do not yet know who actually killed him.
- Leon Burns (42), an American football running back, was shot dead in southeast Los Angeles on 22 December 1984 by persons unknown. The murder remains unsolved.

== 1985–1989 ==
- Nathan Blenner (20) was an American man who was kidnapped in 1985 in Queens, New York and later found dead after being shot in the head. Two teenagers were convicted of killing him, but they were later proven innocent and exonerated. The real killer is unknown.
- In separate incidents in 1985, two managers at fast food restaurants in Alabama—John Davidson (49) on 23 February 1985 and Thomas Wayne Vason (39) on 2 July 1985—were shot to death in armed robberies. A supermarket worker, Anthony Ray Hinton, was picked out of a lineup by a third shooting victim who survived, and was later convicted and received capital punishment; however, the conviction was ultimately vacated unanimously by the Supreme Court in 2014, with findings of serious deficiencies in both the prosecution and defense cases. With the overturning of the conviction, the original murder cases remain unsolved.
- Arthur L. Shapiro (43) was a lawyer and partner at the Columbus, Ohio, law firm Schwartz Shapiro Kelm & Warren, which was assigned to represent The Limited account of billionaire businessman Les Wexner. Shapiro was scheduled to appear before a grand jury to testify about an illegal tax scheme that he had been involved in. On 6 March 1985, he was shot to death in a way that witnesses described as similar to a Mafia hit. The main suspect in Shapiro's murder remained Shapiro's business partner Berry Kessler—no connection to Wexner—the former having had a history of murdering his (Kessler's) business partners by contracting Mafia hit men. Kessler was involved with Shapiro in the illegal tax avoidance schemes, had a motive to silence him, had a history of knocking off business partners, and was seen giving someone a lot of cash the day after the murder, who matched witness descriptions of the killer. Kessler died in prison in 2005 for a different murder, and never admitted to the killing. The Shapiro murder was never officially solved.
- The bombing of a Madrid restaurant on 12 April 1985 killed 18, making it at the time the deadliest terrorist attack in Spain since the Spanish Civil War. Responsibility has been claimed by both domestic groups such as the ETA and radical Muslim groups, all of whom it is believed may have been wanting to target the restaurant since it was popular with U.S. Air Force personnel from a nearby base. The investigation is continuing.
- Winnifred Teo (18) was found stabbed to death on 22 May 1985 on the Old Holland Road in Singapore. She had failed to return home after going jogging the night before; she may also have been raped. The case has never been solved.
- In May 1985, two older women were murdered in New York City hotels just days and blocks apart, one with 'an axe-like weapon' and the other a 'blunt instrument'. On 25 May 1985, Janet C. Scott, (85) was found murdered in her room at the Bryant Hotel, a residential hotel. She suffered a few wounds to her head, believed to be caused by an axe, machete, or cleaver. The suspected motive was robbery. Five days later, Ruth Potdevin (58) of Ridgewood, New Jersey, was found murdered in her room at the Dorset Hotel located at 30 West 54th Street, near Fifth Avenue, just two blocks away from the Bryant. Ruth's husband found her body in the hotel room after she failed to return after going to the room to change clothes for a luncheon. Each woman bore similar wounds on her skull, and a similar ritualistic procedure was performed with a shorn piece of each's hair and scalp. Credit cards had been taken from Ruth's wallet, and just one day following the murder, a man and woman were seen using one of the credit cards in a camera store in Times Square. There were suspect composites created of the individuals who used Ruth's credit cards, but they were likely not the murderers. Neither case was ever solved.
- Tony "Spaghetti" Eustace, an Australian drug dealer, was found murdered on 23 April 1985 next to his gold Mercedes in Arncliffe, New South Wales, after he had been shot six times. He was found dead by two schoolchildren who were returning home from sports training at about 7 pm. The murder remains unsolved.
- In June 1985, a bomb at Germany's Frankfurt Airport killed three, with several Islamic organizations taking credit; the Abu Nidal Organization is believed to have been the real perpetrator, but no arrests have ever been made.
- Haruo Ignacio Remeliik (52) was a politician from Palau. He served as the first President of Palau from 2 March 1981 until his assassination on 30 June 1985. In March 2000, former presidential candidate and convicted felon John O. Ngiraked claimed responsibility for the conspiracy to kill Remeliik, but has not yet been charged with his murder, so the case is officially unsolved.
- On 1 July 1985, a bombing of several international airline offices in Madrid was followed by a submachine gun attack on another nearby airline office, killing one. Representatives of several Muslim groups claimed credit; it is today believed by some to have been perpetrated by the Abu Nidal Organization. No individual suspects have ever been identified.
- Niall Molloy (52), a Catholic priest, was found beaten to death in the master bedroom of Kilcoursey House in Clara, County Offaly, Ireland on 8 July 1985. There were signs of a struggle and evidence that the body had been moved. Richard Flynn, the owner and a longtime friend of Molloy's, confessed the killing to the garda but, at trial, the judge granted the defense a directed verdict of not guilty after merely four hours, believing the medical evidence insufficient to support a manslaughter charge. A coroner's jury later found that Molloy died of head injuries, which led to calls to reopen the case. In subsequent years, it emerged that the investigation had been perfunctory, leaving much evidence unexamined and witness uninterviewed; a 2011 review of the surviving medical evidence found it highly likely that Molloy had survived his injuries for several hours, which raised the question of why emergency services were not called until after he was dead. In 2015 the Irish government declined to open a review, since many of the original witnesses had since died and it did not think any new information would be obtained; Molloy's relatives felt otherwise.
- Ellen Rae Simpson Beason (29) was last seen with friends on 29 July 1985 at the Texas Moon Club in League City, Texas, where she met local construction worker Clyde Hedrick. Later that evening she told her friends that she and Hedrick had made plans to go swimming. Beason's decomposed remains were discovered underneath a sofa in a wooded area beside Old Causeway Road in Galveston County, Texas. Though the medical examiner was initially unable to determine the cause of death, upon the exhumation of Beason's remains in 2012, it was ruled that she had suffered several severe skull fractures.
- The Mineral, Washington murders—which the media has called "the Tube Sock Killings"—is a series of unsolved murders that occurred from 12 August to 12 December 1985 in the remote areas of Lewis and Pierce County, Washington, located close to the remote community of Mineral, Washington. It involves the murders of couple Steven Harkins (27) and Ruth Cooper (42), who had left their Tacoma, Washington, home for a weekend camping trip at Tule Lake in Pierce County, and of couple Mike Riemer (36) and Diana Robertson (21), and their daughter Crystal Louise Robertson (2), who had left their Tacoma home on 12 December 1985 to travel to Pierce County, as they sought to find a camp site near the Nisqually River. Everyone involved was murdered, with the murder cases becoming widely publicized and featured on the television series Unsolved Mysteries in 1989. The killers were never discovered, and the murders remain unsolved.
- Tscherim Soobzokov (61) was a Circassian man accused of collaborating with Nazi Germany during the invasion of the Soviet Union and serving as a Waffen-SS officer. Soobzokov denied these charges, and sued CBS and The New York Times. On 15 August 1985, a pipe bomb set outside his home in Paterson, New Jersey critically injured Soobzokov. He died of his wounds in the hospital on 9 September 1985. An anonymous caller claiming to represent the Jewish Defense League (JDL) said they had carried out the bombing. A spokesman for the JDL later denied responsibility. No one was ever charged with his murder.
- Daramyn Tömör-Ochir (63–64), Mongolian former politician and member of the Politburo of the Mongolian People's Revolutionary Party (MPRP) until his dismissal due to a political conflict with the party in 1962, was murdered with an axe in his apartment in Darkhan on 2 October 1985. The murderer was never apprehended.
- Keith Blakelock (40) was a British police officer who responded to the Broadwater Farm riot in Tottenham on 6 October 1985. While protecting a group of firefighters who were under attack by the rioters, Blakelock was overwhelmed by a group of about 50 people who kicked, beat and stabbed him. He received more than 40 injuries inflicted by machetes and similar weapons, and a six-inch-long knife was buried up to the hilt in his neck when he was found. Three men—Winston Silcott, Engin Raghip, and Mark Braithwaite—were convicted of participating in the murder; however, their convictions were overturned after their three separate confessions to the crime were all found to be either coerced or outright fabricated. Nicholas Jacobs, another man who had previously been described as a "leading figure" in the riot and had served time in prison for his participation, was charged with Blakelock's murder in 2014, but was found not guilty. To date, none of the approximately 50 attackers have been conclusively identified.
- Alex Odeh (41) was an Arab-American anti-discrimination activist who was killed on 11 October 1985 during a bombing incident that occurred at his office in Santa Ana, California. The murder remains unsolved.
- Twenty-eight people were killed (and 22 injured) in a series of violent armed robberies in shops, restaurants and supermarkets in Belgium between 1982 and 1985, most of them in the Province of Brabant. They were perpetrated by a gang of three called the Brabant killers or the "Nijvel gang". Despite decades of (initially chaotic) investigations, the Belgian authorities failed to catch them or even make serious inroads into solving the case, leading to conspiracy theories that state actors were somehow involved in the crimes. It remains Belgium's most notorious unsolved crime spree.
- On Thanksgiving Day 28 November 1985, a bomb in a briefcase caused the deaths of three members of the Blount family at the Hilltop Mobile Home Park near Lake Worth, Texas, for which Michael Roy Toney was convicted in 1999. However, it was later found that exculpatory evidence had been withheld, after which the Tarrant County prosecutors and Texas attorney general moved to vacate his conviction. Toney died in a car accident a month after his exoneration in 2009, and the case has since remained open.
- Dian Fossey (53) was an American primatologist and conservationist known for undertaking an extensive study of mountain gorilla groups from 1966 until her murder on 6 December 1985; she was found bludgeoned to death with visible machete wounds. The perpetrators have not been identified, although they are believed to have been poachers opposed to her conservation efforts.
- Olof Palme (59), Prime Minister of Sweden and the leader of the Swedish Social Democratic Party, was shot in the back while walking home from a cinema together with his wife shortly after 11 pm on 28 February 1986, in Stockholm, Sweden.
- Michele Sindona (65), an Italian banker, was found dead in his prison cell on the morning of 22 March 1986 after drinking a cup of coffee that had been laced with cyanide; he had been serving a life sentence for murder. No charges were ever brought after his death. Investigation of his activities and ties to the Sicilian Mafia had led to the exposure of Italy's P2 Masonic lodge.
- Pauline Martz was left in her burning home on 13 April 1986 after being bound and gagged by someone who had broken in. A man named Johnny Lee Wilson was imprisoned for her murder after confessing, but was pardoned in 1995. Another man, Chris Brownfield, also confessed to the crime with an accomplice. No other charges have been made in this case, which is currently inactive and remains unsolved.
- Lolita (36), an Italian pop singer, had intended to attend a musical event on the night of 27 April 1986, but did not show up; she was found stabbed to death the following morning, with her body disfigured in several areas. The crime remains unsolved.
- Alejandro Gonzalez Malave, a Puerto Rican who was involved in the Cerro Maravilla murders case, was shot at his mother's home on 29 April 1986. The assailants were never apprehended.
- Tanya Moore (31) and Tina Rodriguez (27) were two transgender friends working as prostitutes on Philadelphia's Thirteenth Street in 1986. The pair disappeared on 30 June 1986 after getting into the car of a couple of clients. Their mutilated and dismembered bodies were found burning on 3 July at a baseball diamond in Middletown. Their murders remains unsolved.
- Sherry Ann Duncan (16), a Thai-American high school student, was abducted after leaving her school in Bangkok, Thailand, on 22 July 1986. Her body was found a few days later in some wetlands. Four men were arrested and sentenced to death for her murder, but were later proven to be innocent and acquitted in 1995. Duncan's true killer(s) has/have never been found.
- Yvan Leyvraz (32), a Swiss member of the international solidarity brigades in Sandinista-run Nicaragua, was killed—along with four others—in a contra ambush upon leaving Wiwili on 28 July 1986. No arrests have ever been made, and the murders remains unsolved.
- Willem Klein (73), a Dutch mathematician, was found dead of stab wounds in his Amsterdam apartment on 1 August 1986. A young man was arrested shortly afterwards, but was released. No other suspects have ever been named.
- Dele Giwa (39), a Nigerian journalist who was the editor and founder of Newswatch magazine, was killed by a mail bomb in his Lagos home on 19 October 1986. The murder has never been solved.
- Chaim Weiss (15), a yeshiva student, was found bludgeoned to death in his dormitory bedroom in Long Beach, New York, on 1 November 1986. The Daily News called it "one of New York's most baffling unsolved mysteries".
- Sylvie Aubert (22), a cashier working at a supermarket in Chalon-sur-Saône, France, disappeared after she left her workplace. Her severely decomposed body was recovered five months later, on 4 April 1987, from the river Dheune. Her body was naked, her wrists were bound by wire, and she had been strangled. Aubert is one of multiple victims of the unsolved A6 disappearances.
- Immanuel Shifidi (57) was a Namibian activist and one of the fighters at Omugulugwombashe. After the defeat at Omugulugwombashe, he was sentenced to death, but this was converted to life in prison following international pressure, and he was released in December 1985. He was assassinated on 30 November 1986 at a SWAPO rally marking the United Nations International Year of Peace. His killer is unknown.
- Christelle Maillery (16), a French teenage girl, was found dead on 18 December 1986 in Le Creusot after being stabbed multiple times by persons unknown.
- Jaye Potter Mintz (23) was found murdered in her Leland, North Carolina, home on 23 February 1987. Her two-year-old son was found unharmed in the house. A few hours before the murder, Mintz's mother had called to say that she had given Mintz's address to a man who was looking to purchase a waterbed that the latter had advertised in a newspaper using her mother's telephone number. However, Mintz had already sold the waterbed earlier that day, and assured her mother that she would apologize to the man. A newspaper clipping with the advertisement circled was discovered at the scene, but it did not lead investigators to any possible suspects.
- The 5 March 1987 death of Harry Dudkin (79)—a former judge, congressional candidate and clerk of the state Assembly—was initially believed by police in East Orange, New Jersey, to have been the result of a fall in his family's stationery store; later, the autopsy revealed a bullet lodged in his brain. Upon further investigation, it was discovered that the store's receipts for that day were missing. The case remains open.
- Daniel Morgan (37), a private investigator, was murdered on 10 March 1987 in Sydenham, south-east London, by an axe blow to the back of the head. He was said to have been close to exposing police corruption, or involved with Maltese drug dealers. Morgan's death has been the subject of several failed police inquiries, and in 2011 it was at the centre of allegations concerning the suspect conduct of journalists with the British tabloid News of the World. This unsolved murder has been described as a reminder of the culture of corruption and unaccountability within the Metropolitan Police Service, London's main police force.
- Ang May Hong (9), a Malaysian schoolgirl, was last seen by her eldest brother on 12 April 1987 when the siblings split up while on the way to buy breakfast at a market near their house in Jalan Ipoh, Kuala Lumpur. Three hours after she went missing, Ang's family discovered her naked body at an empty house in a nearby desolate area. A metre-long piece of wood with nails had been stuffed into her private parts, rupturing her inner organs; an autopsy report confirmed that she had been sexually assaulted by her killer(s) prior to her death. It was speculated that at least eight people were involved in her murder, based on the teeth marks left on her body. The murder remains unsolved.
- Gary Driscoll (41), an American R&B rock drummer who performed with a number of successful bands in the 1960s, was found murdered on 8 June 1987 at his friend's home in Ithaca, New York. Two men were charged in the killing, but one fled before he could be charged, while the other was acquitted.
- The body of Peggy Hettrick (37) was found on 11 June 1987 in a field in Fort Collins, Colorado; she had been stabbed and "sexually mutilated". Police initially suspected Timothy Masters, a teenage boy who lived nearby, and eventually arrested him a decade later. His 1999 conviction was vacated in 2008 when physical evidence that had been withheld from the defense at his original trial was found to rule him out as a suspect. Two other individuals, one of whom took his own life in 1995, have been described as possible suspects. The case remains open.
- Isaac Barrientos (21), a male boxer from Puerto Rico, was shot and killed on 14 June 1987 by unknown persons in San Juan, Puerto Rico.
- In July 1987, in a case dubbed the Viking Sally murder mystery, German tourist Klaus Schelkle (20) was murdered and his girlfriend, Bettina Taxis (22), was seriously injured on board the cruise ferry MS Viking Sally, en route from Stockholm, Sweden, to Turku, Finland. In December 2020, charges were filed against a Danish man who was among those who discovered the victims, but the suspect was acquitted in June 2021.
- Marthe Buisson (16), a French teenage girl, was found dead on 15 August 1987 alongside the emergency lane on the A6, after people claimed to have seen her thrown from a vehicle by persons unknown.
- On 23 August 1987, Don Henry (16) and Kevin Ives (17) were lying motionless across the railroad tracks in Alexander, Arkansas, in front of an oncoming 75-car, 6,000-ton Union Pacific locomotive en route to Little Rock. The engineer stated that he spotted the two boys—who were wrapped in a green tarp—and blew the horn while applying the brakes, but was unable to stop in time, and they were run over. Nearby was a .22-caliber rifle and a flashlight. How the boys ended up there and who caused this murder is unknown.
- Nadji al-Ali (48–49), a Palestinian cartoonist noted for his political criticism of the Arab regimes and Israel in his works, was shot at on 22 July 1987 outside the Ives Street offices of Kuwaiti newspaper Al Qabas in London, causing him to fall into a coma; he died on 26 August 1987. It remains unknown who shot at him, with suspicions falling on the PLO, Mossad, or Force 17, the latter group taking orders from Yasser Arafat.
- Nathalie Maire (18), French teenage woman was found dead on 2 September 1987 after being assaulted by persons unknown.
- Eleven people were killed and a twelfth left in a fatal coma when a bomb exploded near the war memorial in Enniskillen on 8 November 1987 during a Remembrance Sunday parade. The Provisional Irish Republican Army claimed responsibility, saying that the bombing was a mistake and the intended target had been Ulster Defence Regiment soldiers who had not yet arrived when the bomb detonated. Nobody has ever been charged over the bombing.
- On 17 November 1987, police found the beaten bodies of Elaine Dardeen (30) and her son Peter (3), as well as a newborn female infant to whom she had apparently given birth prematurely during the attack, tucked into bed in the family mobile home south of Ina, Illinois. Her husband Keith (29) was the prime suspect until his body was found in a nearby wheat field the next day. After shooting him, the killer had cut his penis off. Nothing of value was taken from the home and Elaine had not been raped, nor were police able to find any other evidence that might have suggested a motive. In 2000, serial killer Tommy Lynn Sells confessed to the crime; however, he was never charged as there were doubts about his confession and authorities in Texas, where he was imprisoned, would not allow him to be taken to Illinois to resolve them before he was executed in 2014. No other suspects have ever been named.
- The decomposing body of Deanna Criswell (16) was found off Interstate 10 near Tucson, Arizona, on 23 November 1987. The body had been there for a possible period of time ranging from several days to several weeks. She remained unidentified for 28 years until DNA tests matched her with her family in Spokane, Washington; they had not reported her disappearance at the time because she habitually ran away only to return later. Another DNA profile at the scene matched that of the main suspect in her death, William Ross Knight, a local criminal who had died in 2005.
- Alexander Harris (7), of Mountain View, California, vanished from the video arcade of Whiskey Pete's Hotel and Casino in Primm, Nevada, on 27 November 1987. His body was found 33 days later under an off-property trailer. Howard Lee Haupt, a computer programmer from San Diego who was staying at the hotel when the boy disappeared, was arrested on suspicion but acquitted in 1989 after a five-week trial. No further arrests were ever made in the case.
- Víctor Yturbe (51) was a Mexican singer, nicknamed "El Pirulí", who was murdered on 28 November 1987 in Atizapan de Zaragoza. Yturbe was shot after he opened the door to his house. The cause was never established and no one has ever been charged with his killing.
- Heidi Härö (19) disappeared in Mäntsälä in December 1987 after leaving a local bar and possibly hitching a ride. Her decomposed body was found five months later in a forest area in Pukkila with some of her clothes missing. Härö may have been a victim of the Hausjärvi Gravel Pit Murders.
- The Favoriten Girl Murders involves the murdering of three females that took place from 1988 to 1990 in the Viennese district of Favoriten. One of the murders remain unsolved.
- Several motorcyclists opened fire on Punjabi singer Amar Singh Chamkila (27) and his wife as they got out of a car before a performance in Mehsampur on 8 March 1988. The couple and two of Chamkila's musicians were killed. Several theories as to who might have been responsible for the killings have been floated since then, but no suspects have ever been officially identified.
- Brian Spencer (39), who played for several National Hockey League teams during a 10-year career that ended in 1979, was shot during a robbery after allegedly buying cocaine in Riviera Beach, Florida, on 2 June 1988. He died the next day. The year before, Spencer had been acquitted of a 1982 murder and kidnapping. Despite not entirely believing the story told them by Spencer's companion that night, police said he was not a suspect. No one else has ever been named in connection with the crime.
- Tiffany Moore (12) was killed on 19 August 1988 in the Roxbury neighbourhood of Boston, Massachusetts when she was caught in the crossfire of a shootout between rival gangs. Two suspects were brought to trial for her murder; one was acquitted, and the other served 14 years in prison for murder before his conviction was overturned on appeal after it was revealed that the police had pressured eyewitnesses to lie and hidden evidence which would have proved he was not at the scene.
- Julie Ward was murdered in Kenya on 6 September 1988, while on safari in the Maasai Mara game reserve. Her burnt and dismembered body was found a week later. The original statement by Kenyan officials was that she had been eaten by lions and struck by lightning, but this was later revised to say she was murdered.
- Jaclyn Dowaliby (7) disappeared from her home in Midlothian, Illinois during the night of 10 September 1988. Her body was found in a nearby dump four days later. Her mother and adoptive father were charged with her murder; she was acquitted and he was convicted, a verdict later overturned on appeal due to lack of evidence.
- Seymour and Arlene Tankleff were found murdered in their Long Island home on 17 September 1988. Their 17-year-old son Martin was charged with the crime and convicted, a verdict overturned on appeal in 2004; the state decided in 2008 not to retry him. His lawyers accused the police detective who originally arrested Martin of having lied during the investigation to cover for a business associate who they believe was the actual killer; he denies it. Neither the business associate nor anyone else have ever been formally named as a suspect.
- Pamela Walton (25) was a transgender woman believed to have been murdered between July and September 1988 who was found in Clermont, Florida, on 25 September 1988. Prior to her identification in March 2025, she was nicknamed "Julie Doe".
- Two Victoria Police constables, Steven Tynan, 22, and Damian Eyre, 20, were shot and killed in an apparently planned ambush as they responded to a report of an abandoned car early on the morning of 12 October 1988, in the Melbourne suburb of South Yarra. Police suspected six members of the local Pettingill gang of having carried out the killing in response to recent police killings of other gang members which they believed to have been premeditated. Two were themselves killed when police attempted to arrest them; the other four were tried and acquitted. In 2005 the widow of one of the acquitted men said in an interview that she believed her late husband was guilty. The case later inspired the 2010 film Animal Kingdom and the identically named American TV series.
- Skeletal remains found 11 November 1988, off a road near Lake Nasworthy outside San Angelo, Texas, turned out to be the bodies of Sally McNelly (18) and Shane Stewart (17), missing since they had last been seen on the lakeshore, alone, the night of the previous 4 July. Both had been shot in the head. Local rumor at the time connected the killings to a supposed Satanic cult the two had been involved in and were trying to get out of, but no arrests were ever made. In 2017, a drug arrest led police to identify a local person of interest.
- Kazem Sami Kermani (52–53) was Iran's minister of health in the transitional government of Mehdi Bazargan and leader of the Iranian Nation Liberation Movement (JAMA). He was found murdered on 23 November 1988 in his private medical clinic. The case has not been solved.
- Venus Xtravaganza (23), who featured in the documentary film Paris Is Burning, was found strangled under a New York City hotel bed on 21 December 1988, four days after having been killed. There are no suspects.
- On 3 February 1989, the partially undressed body of 10-year-old Christina Beranek was found in an apartment complex situated in the Favoriten district of Vienna, Austria. She had been abused and strangled to death, then tied to a nearby railing with her own clothes. Her murder was the second in a series of three murders that occurred in the area, initially thought to be the work of a serial killer, but the two other cases were later found to be unrelated. The investigation into her killing was the largest in Austrian history, but to this day, nobody has been convicted. Authorities suspected that Herbert P., the man who killed one of the other two victims in the so-called "Favoriten Girl Murders", is responsible for her death.
- Cissy Stuart (74), an American newspaper owner, was stabbed to death on 2 April 1989 in her Princeton, New Jersey home. Her fully clothed body was found in her locked basement two days later by her sister and a maid. Police have stated that the basement door having been padlocked suggested that the killer must have been familiar with the house. No suspects were ever identified, and the case remains unsolved.
- John Holmes Jenkins III (48–49) was an American historian, poker player, antiquarian bookseller, and publisher who was killed near Bastrop, Texas on 16 April 1989, after being shot from behind by persons unknown. The murder remains unsolved.
- Paul C. McKasty (24), better known as "Paul C", was an East coast hip hop pioneer, producer, engineer, and mixer in the 1980s. On 17 July 1989, McKasty was shot to death in Rosedale, Queens. His murder was featured on America's Most Wanted, and the murder remains unsolved.
- Luis Carlos Galán (45), Colombian journalist and liberal politician, was murdered on 18 August 1989, in Bogotá, Cundinamarca, Colombia by unknown persons before he was to give a speech. The murder remains unsolved.
- Heidi Hazell (26) was a German woman who on 7 September 1989 was killed by an unknown member of the Provisional Irish Republican Army. Her murder remains unsolved.
- Anton Lubowski (37) was a Namibian anti-apartheid activist and advocate. He was a member of the South West Africa People's Organization (SWAPO). On 12 September 1989, Lubowski was shot by a group of assailants who were operatives of South Africa's Civil Cooperation Bureau in front of his house in Sanderburg Street in central Windhoek. He was hit by several shots from an AK-47 automatic rifle and died from a bullet wound to his head. The true identities of the killers is unknown.
- Ahmed Abdallah (70), the president of the Comoros Islands, was shot in his palace on 26 November 1989 during a failed coup attempt. French mercenaries Bob Denard and Dominique Malacrino stood trial for the murder in 1999 but were acquitted. Denard maintained that the actual killer was presidential bodyguard Abdallah Jaffar.
- Alfred Herrhausen (59), then chairman of Deutsche Bank, was assassinated on 30 November 1989, in his hometown Bad Homburg when an explosively formed projectile penetrated his armored car. The German left-wing terrorist group RAF claimed responsibility shortly after, but while it seems likely that the group was responsible, the actual killers could not be identified so far.
- The Porn Murders occurred between February and December 1989 in Stockholm, Sweden, where three men working in or connected to adult video stores were murdered—each stabbed to death, often during closing hours. Police suspected a single perpetrator with a possible hatred of the porn industry, but the murders remain unsolved.

== 1990–1994 ==
- The body of Amy Mihaljevic (10) was found in Ruggles Township, Ohio, on 8 February 1990. She had been abducted from a Bay Village shopping center three months earlier. No suspects have ever been named, although police have been exploring some leads in recent years.
- Chaskel Werzberger was shot in the head during a carjacking in Williamsburg, Brooklyn, on 8 February 1990. David Ranta was wrongfully convicted of the murder in 1991 and served 23 years before his conviction was vacated and the indictment dismissed in 2013 due to police misconduct and unreliable testimony. The perpetrator remains unidentified.
- Despite extensive investigation and publicity, the gunmen who killed five people, including two children, at a Las Cruces, New Mexico, bowling alley on 10 February 1990, have never been identified or apprehended.
- Michael Fleming (19) was shot and killed on 24 February 1990 by an assailant near a reggae nightclub on the North Side of Chicago; despite having an alibi and physical differences from a description of the killer, Lathierial Boyd was picked out of a lineup and later convicted. Subsequent investigations and media reports found significant flaws in the initial prosecution, and Boyd was later exonerated after more than 20 years in prison. Following his exoneration, the original murder case remains unsolved.
- Cornell Gunter (53), an American rhythm and blues singer from Coffeyville, Kansas, died after being shot on 26 February 1990 while he sat in his car. Who killed him is unknown.
- Çetin Emeç (54–55) was a Turkish journalist and columnist, who was assassinated on 7 March 1990, by persons unknown. The case has not been solved.
- John Evers Robinson, also known as "Rokked" (24), a musician in a Connecticut hardcore trio named Sold On Murder, was bludgeoned to death on 12 March 1990. His body was found two days later in a locked office space in downtown New Haven, Connecticut. The case is currently unsolved.
- Canadian-American weapons designer Gerald Bull (62) died in Brussels, Belgium, on 22 March 1990, two days after being shot several times near his apartment. It has been speculated that the Israeli Mossad was behind his death, as they may have believed his work for Saddam Hussein's Iraq might allow that country to develop weapons that could be used against their country, after he had refused to work with Israel. Other theories have implicated Iraq itself, Iran, the U.S. or other countries he was known to have dealt with. The identities of the killers remain unknown.
- Lü Wei (23–24), a female Chinese diver who was a gold medalist in Universiade and Asian Games from 1982 to 1987 who while at her friend's house on 9 May 1990, was murdered along with the friend. The killers were never found.
- Mami Matsuda (4), a Japanese girl from Ashikaga, Tochigi Prefecture, Japan, went missing on 12 May 1990 from a pachinko parlor, and was later found dead at the Watarase River which was located nearby. Whoever killed Matsuda is unknown.
- Kelly Tan Ah Hong (21) was a Singaporean who was killed by one of the two men who attacked both Tan and her boyfriend while they were having a date at Amber Beacon Tower inside East Coast Park on May 15, 1990. Although the male victim, 22-year-old James Soh Fook Leong, survived despite being stabbed on the back, Tan died after her assailant(s) knifed her on the neck, causing her to bleed to death. The motive for the attack was suspected to be robbery despite the victims not losing anything. A coroner's court issued a verdict of murder by an unknown person(s) two years after Tan's killing. Despite extensive police investigations and public appeals by the family and authorities, the killer(s) were never caught and the murder remains unsolved as of today.
- French Baptist minister Joseph Doucé (45) disappeared on 19 July 1990 and was found dead in a forest in October 1990, two months after he was last seen being led away from his apartment by men who claimed to be police officers. No suspect has ever been identified.
- Alexander Men (55) was a Russian Orthodox priest, theologian, biblical scholar and writer on theology, Christian history and other religions. He was murdered early on 9 September 1990 by an ax-wielding assailant outside his home in Semkhoz, Russia. The case is currently unsolved.
- The Bowraville murders is the name given to three deaths that occurred over five months from 13 September 1990, to 18 February 1991, in Bowraville, New South Wales, Australia. All three victims were Aboriginal. All three victims disappeared after parties in the Aboriginal community in Bowraville, in an area known as The Mission. Two of the victims were later found dead. A local labourer, who was regarded by police as the prime suspect, was charged with two of the murders but was acquitted following trials in 1994 and 2006. On 13 September 2018, the New South Wales Court of Criminal Appeal decided that the man could not be retried for the murders. The murders remain unsolved.
- Roy Francis Adkins (42), English gangster from Hammersmith, London, was murdered in Amsterdam on 28 September 1990 by unknown people after being shot.
- Danny Rodriguez (22), whose stage name was "D-Boy Rodriguez", was an American Christian rap artist who was murdered in Dallas, Texas on 6 October 1990 by persons unknown. The murder remains unsolved.
- Bahriye Üçok (70–71) was a Turkish academic of theology, left-wing politician, writer, columnist, and women's rights activist whose assassination on 6 October 1990 remains unresolved.
- Janie Perrin (73) was sexually assaulted and murdered on 2 November 1990, in her home in Bourke, a town in the Far West of the Australian state of New South Wales. The crime remains unsolved and the New South Wales Government offered a reward of $100,000 for information leading to the arrest and conviction of those responsible.
- Carole Soltysiak (13), a French teenage girl, was found dead on 18 November 1990; she was discovered in a forest that is close to Montceau-les-Mines. Her killer is unknown.
- On 20 November 1990, the body of Susan Poupart was discovered in Wisconsin's Chequamegon-Nicolet National Forest, six months after she had last been seen leaving a party in Lac du Flambeau. The two men she was last seen with have been considered suspects. Charges against one led to several hearings in 2007, but were dropped after witnesses failed to testify.
- The Teteringen Girl (15–25) is an unidentified female murder victim discovered on 25 December 1990 in Teteringen, in a forest and was missing certain clothes. Her killer is not known.
- Enrique Bermúdez (58), also known as "Comandante 380", was a Nicaraguan who founded and commanded the Nicaraguan Contras. In this capacity, he became a central figure in one of the most prominent conflicts of the Cold War. On 16 February 1991, Bermudez was assassinated in Managua, by persons unknown.
- Five boys aged 9 through 13 went to the woods around South Korea's Mount Waryong on 26 March 1991, to hunt for salamanders (which became known as frogs because salamanders were not known that well at that time) and never returned. Despite a massive search of the mountain and surroundings, their bodies were not found until 2002, after an anonymous phone call led police to an area that had already been searched near the boys' village. At first, it was theorized that they had died of exposure, a conclusion disputed by their families since the boys knew that area well and their clothes had been tied in knots. An autopsy showed that four had died of blows to the head and the other had been killed with a shotgun. Although the statute of limitations on the case expired in 2006, police continue to investigate for historical reasons.
- On 1 April 1991, at 23:30, Detlev Rohwedder, president of the German organization Treuhandanstalt, was shot and killed through a window on the first floor of his house in the suburb of Düsseldorf-Niederkassel by the first of three rifle shots. West German far-left militant group Red Army Faction (RAF) claimed responsibility for this act, but the sniper was never identified. In 2001, a DNA analysis found that hair strands from the crime scene belonged to RAF member Wolfgang Grams. However, the attorney general did not consider this evidence sufficient to name Grams as a suspect of the killing.
- Karmein Chan (13) was abducted from her family's home in Templestowe, Victoria on 13 April 1991 by an unidentified man who was later dubbed "Mr. Cruel" by Melbourne newspapers. Her body was discovered on 9 April 1992, in Thomastown; she had been shot in the head. Although Victoria Police knew a great deal about the perpetrator from previous, non-fatal child abductions and rapes dating back to 1985, there has never been enough evidence to charge any of the 27,000 men interviewed at the time. The case is still open, with a second police operation, Taskforce Apollo, formed in 2010 to examine new evidence and material from the original Operation Spectrum. If the perpetrator is still alive, he would be between approximately 60 and 75 years old in 2014. The murder of Karmein Chan is still one of the most extensive and expensive investigations in Victorian history, with a combination of investigative errors and the perpetrator's precautions preventing his identification and arrest.
- Mary Joe Frug (50), a feminist professor teaching at New England Law Boston, was attacked and stabbed to death by an unknown assailant on the streets of Cambridge, Massachusetts on 4 April 1991. Her killer has not been found.
- Tuula Lukkarinen (28) disappeared on the morning of 17 April 1991 after leaving a Kellokoski psychiatrist hospital where she had been staying as an inpatient, planning to travel to Hyrylä to attend a meeting about her son's custody case. The following day, Lukkarinen's mutilated body was discovered by a landowner in Hikiä. Police also recovered her handbag and a possible murder weapon at the scene.
- Ioan P. Culianu (41), a Romanian American professor of religion at the University of Chicago, was shot in the back of the head in a bathroom of the university's divinity school building on 21 May 1991. While rightist Romanian nationalists in the then-new Romanian government of Ion Iliescu, some of whom openly celebrated his death, and members of the Communist-era Securitate intelligence service were suspected, along with occultists who also clashed with Culianu, no one has ever been formally identified as one.
- Timothy Wiltsey (5) disappeared on 25 May 1991 while visiting a carnival in Sayreville, New Jersey with his mother, Michelle Lodzinski. His body was found in Edison in April 1992. His death was ruled to be a homicide. Lodzinski was convicted of Timothy's murder 23 years later, but her conviction was overturned in 2021; no other suspects were identified.
- Penny Bell (43) was an English businesswoman who was murdered on 6 June 1991 in the car park of Gurnell Leisure Centre, Greenford, London on 6 June 1991. She was stabbed more than fifty times as she sat behind the wheel of her car. There were a few witnesses in the case, one of them came forward six months after the murder and claimed he saw Bell driving into the car park with a passenger, and mouthing an appeal for help, which he ignored. Despite some potential suspects, her murder remains unsolved.
- Hitoshi Igarashi (44), a Japanese scholar of Arabic and Persian literature and history and the Japanese translator of Salman Rushdie's novel The Satanic Verses, was murdered on 12 July 1991 in Tsukuba, Ibaraki in the wake of fatwas issued by Iranian Ayatollah Ruhollah Khomeini calling for the death of the book's author and "those involved in its publication."
- A retired police officer accused of killing four security guards in the course of stealing $200,000 from the United Bank Tower in downtown Denver, Colorado on 14 June 1991 was acquitted the following year. He died in 2013; the case remains open.
- Mandy Lemaire (11) disappeared form Tazlina, Alaska on 22 August 1991 and was found dead ten days later after being killed. Suspect Charles Smithart was charged and convicted with killing her, but the decision was overturned and he later died from lung cancer, leaving her case unsolved.
- The body of Robert Donati (51), a Boston-area mobster believed to have masterminded the theft of $500 million worth of art from the Isabella Stewart Gardner Museum the year before, was found beaten and stabbed multiple times in the trunk of his car on 24 September 1991, three days after he had last been seen alive leaving his nearby home in Revere, Massachusetts. He was likely a casualty of an ongoing war for control of the Patriarca crime family, but no suspects have ever been charged with the crime.
- Igor Talkov (34) was a Russian rock singer-songwriter, who was shot backstage at the Yubileiny concert hall in Leningrad on 6 October 1991. While Valeriy Schlyafman, Talkov's one time manager, was found guilty of the murder by a Russian court, he fled via Ukraine to Israel before he could be arrested. He remains in Israel to this day, insisting he is not guilty of the crime while Israel refuses to extradite him. Schlyafman and his supporters have claimed that the KGB orchestrated the murder. Since no one has been charged and it is unclear for sure who the true killer is, the case remains unsolved.
- Wilson dos Santos had served as the representative of the National Union for the Total Independence of Angola (UNITA), a rebel group in Angola, to Portugal. He was murdered in November 1991 by unknown persons. The case remains unsolved.
- Three-month-old Kristie Fischer was killed in a house fire at her family home in Thornwood, New York on 1 December 1991. The authorities concluded the fire had been deliberately set by someone inside the house. The only other person in the house at the time was Olivia Riner, the Fischer family's nanny, who was prosecuted the following year but was acquitted after the defense argued that the fire was likely started by an intruder, possibly the boyfriend of Kristie's sister.
- On 5 December 1991, the dead body of Heinz Bonn, a professional German football player who today is considered the first professional German football player known to be homosexual, was found in his apartment in the Hanover district of Linden. After last being seen alive in Hannover on 27 November 1991, it was estimated that Bonn, who had been stabbed multiple times, had died a week prior to his body being found. The culprit for Bonn's murder has never been found.
- Katrien De Cuyper (15) disappeared on her way home in Antwerp, Belgium, on the night of 17 December 1991. Her body was found buried in the port of Antwerp six months later. In 1997, Regina Louf confessed to killing De Cuyper while being part of a "paedophile network", but no concrete evidence was found to support her testimony. In 2006, a 35-year-old man was arrested and charged with De Cuyper's kidnapping and murder after it was established that he had written anonymous letters about her to a magazine, but he was later released due to a lack of evidence.
- Joe Cole (30), roadie, was shot and killed on 19 December 1991, during a robbery outside the Venice Beach, California, home he shared with Black Flag lead singer Henry Rollins, who was present and escaped. No suspects have ever been identified.
- James Howard Conklin (42), known as Kane County John Doe, was thought to have been murdered in 1992. His body was found in 1994 and identified in 2024.
- Akio Kashiwagi was a wealthy Tokyo-based real estate investor who was known for the large amounts of money he wagered at Las Vegas and Atlantic City casinos. On 3 January 1992, he was killed by being stabbed as many as 150 times with a samurai sword. His body was discovered in his home in Japan near Mount Fuji. According to a story published in Politico magazine, Kashiwagi owed Donald Trump $4 million in unrecovered gambling debts. The murder remains unsolved.
- Albert Glock (66), a Lutheran biblical archaeologist who had spent 17 years in Jerusalem and the West Bank as a part of various expeditions, was shot and killed in Ramallah on 9 January 1992. Neither reason for the murder nor who did it was reliably identified, though it is thought that Hamas could have been responsible.
- A suicide bomber drove a truck filled with explosives into the Israeli embassy in Argentina on 17 March 1992, killing 29 in the deadliest attack ever on an Israeli diplomatic mission. Argentinian officials said they strongly believed Iran was behind the attack. They have not formally prosecuted any suspects, though they suspected that Imad Mughniyah was involved in both this attack and the deadlier AMIA bombing two years later.
- Anjelica Castillo (4) was discovered in a cooler in Manhattan, New York on 23 July 1991, several days after her death. The victim remained unidentified for 22 years. Her cousin, Conrado Juarez, was arrested for her murder and sexual assault after the remains were identified in 2013. Juarez would later claim his confession was coerced and he died before his trial in 2018, changing his plea to "not guilty". Juarez died in police custody on 19 November 2018, from pancreatic cancer.
- Exiled Iranian dissident Fereydoun Farrokhzad (53) was found dead of multiple stab wounds in his house in Bonn, Germany, on 13 August 1992. The autopsy established that he had been killed five days earlier. No one has ever been named as a suspect although it is widely believed that he was killed at the behest of the Iranian government. Prior to his murder, Farrokzhad had been involved in producing an opposition radio program and reportedly received death threats. In his show at the Royal Albert Hall in London, he had criticized Ruhollah Khomeini and made fun of Khomeini's obsession with sex in his Ressaleh book. He had consequently received death threats and there were concerns for his safety.
- Holly Staker (11), who had been babysitting two younger children in the Chicago satellite city of Waukegan, Illinois, was sexually assaulted and murdered on 17 August 1992. In a series of trials and re-trials upon appeal, nearby resident Juan Rivera was convicted of the crime and given a life sentence without parole. His conviction was eventually vacated, however, and he was exonerated when a further examination of the circumstances and physical evidence fully ruled him out as a perpetrator. Investigations later established connections between DNA evidence from the case and another home invasion and murder case from 2000, but no subsequent arrests have yet been made.
- Piotr Jaroszewicz (82), a former Prime Minister of Communist Poland, was found murdered along with his wife Alicja Solska at their home in the Warsaw suburb of Anin on 3 September 1992. He had been strangled with a belt, which was still around his neck, after being beaten; his wife had been shot several times with one of the couple's hunting rifles after her hands were tied behind her back. She may have injured one of their attackers, who apparently also tried to kill the couple's dog with poison gas, while fighting back. A safe was left open and documents were taken from it while valuables were left behind. The killings were found to have occurred two days before; friends and family say that Jaroszewicz, who was obsessed with security to begin with, had been acting extremely paranoid in the days before the murders. A group of criminals known as the 'Karate Gang' were put on trial in 2021 for the murder of Jaroszewicz and his wife, but were acquitted in 2024.
- Jeremias Chitunda (50) and Elias Salupeto Pena were both representatives of the National Union for the Total Independence of Angola (UNITA), an anti-Communist rebel group that fought against the People's Movement for the Liberation of Angola (MPLA) in the Angolan Civil War, to the Joint Military and Political Commission. Chitunda and Pena were killed on 2 November 1992, and their murder remains unsolved.
- Brian Kaiser (41), a taxi driver in Poughkeepsie, New York, was shot execution-style in the back of the head on 28 November 1992 by an unknown assailant. The case remains open and no suspects have been named or identified.
- Hazelle Fenty (76), an ordained deacon at Indigo Lakes Baptist Church in Daytona Beach, Florida, was found murdered in the church's nursery on December 4, 1992, her 76th birthday. Her throat had been slit and there were indications of sexual assault, with DNA and other evidence collected at the scene; as of December 2024, detectives had not named specific suspects but confirmed there were two persons of interest connected to the crime.
- Clare Morrison (13) was an Australian girl who was murdered on 19 December 1992 in Geelong, Victoria. Her near-naked body was discovered by surfers early morning on 19 December near Bells Beach, bashed, strangled and shark-bitten. As of 2019, the murder remains unsolved.
- Kori Lamaster (17), a formerly unidentified female American murder victim, was killed in 1993 after running away from home. Lamaster was later found dead on 29 January 1994, Lamaster's identity was unknown for the next nineteen years and her murder remains a mystery.
- In between 1993 and 2005 it was calculated that more than 370 women were killed in northern Mexico in a city called Ciudad Juárez. The killers behind these mass murders remain unknown.
- Uğur Mumcu (50), a Turkish investigative journalist for the daily Cumhuriyet, was assassinated on 24 January 1993, by a bomb placed in his car outside his home. His murder remains unsolved.
- Archie Butterley was an Australian fugitive and a sidekick of Peter Gibb who escaped from jail on 7 March 1993 and was shot dead on 13 March 1993 by persons unknown. The murder remains unsolved.
- Retired Canadian professional wrestler Adolfo Bresciano (44), who performed under the name Dino Bravo, was found dead of multiple gunshot wounds in his Laval, Quebec, home on 10 March 1993. It is believed by law enforcement and those who knew him that he was killed by the Montreal Mafia over his successful cigarette smuggling business. Officially, no suspects have ever been identified.
- In the late hours of 22 April 1993, Black British teenager Stephen Lawrence (18) was killed by a group of White British males in a racially motivated attack in London. While the exact number of Stephen Lawrence's killers who remain unidentified is not definitively known, it is widely believed that there were at least five people involved and three of the suspected individuals have never been convicted. The five suspects were identified as Gary Dobson, David Norris, Neil & Jamie Acourt, and Luke Knight. Of these, only Gary Dobson and David Norris were ever convicted; they were found guilty in January 2012 and were given life sentences in prison. The other three suspects were arrested and charged just weeks after the murder but the charges were dropped in July 1993 due to insufficient evidence.
- Madan Bhandari (41), the General-Secretary when CPN (ML) merged into the Communist Party of Nepal (Unified Marxist–Leninist) in 1991, and the husband of Biddha Devi Bhandari, who was the second president of federal democratic Nepal, died in a car accident on 16 May 1993. His death is suspected of being a murder case.
- Jayne Furlong (17) was a New Zealand teenager from Auckland who disappeared from a street in Auckland on 26 May 1993, while working in the sex trade. She had been abducted and murdered. The case remains unsolved.
- Colin Ridgway (56), the first Australian to play in the National Football League, was murdered in his University Park, Texas, home on 13 May 1993. Police suspect that a man serving time in Florida for a 2011 murder committed the crime after being hired by Ridgway's wife and his father; however, they have not found sufficient evidence to arrest anyone.
- Chekannur Maulavi (57), an Indian secular Islamist and founder of the Quran Sannath, was kidnapped and likely murdered by ultra-orthodox Muslim sectarians. While two men were arrested for his murder, they have never been brought to trial and the case is considered unsolved.
- Brett Cantor (25), part-owner of the Dragonfly nightclub in Hollywood, was found stabbed to death in his nearby home on 30 July 1993; no suspects have ever been identified. The case gained renewed attention a year later when O. J. Simpson's defense team successfully petitioned the court trying him for the murders of Nicole Brown Simpson, his ex-wife, and Ronald Goldman, for access to the case file, on the grounds that the way in which all three were stabbed suggested the same killer. Since Goldman had worked for Cantor as a waiter, and Nicole Simpson was a regular at Dragonfly, some books about the case have raised the possibility that the three killings may also have resulted from involvement in drug trafficking.
- The body of Holly Piirainen (10) was found on 23 October 1993 in the woods of Brimfield, Massachusetts. She had disappeared in August while visiting her grandparents in nearby Sturbridge. Police have identified two persons of interest, one of whom died in 2003, the other of whom has been named in connection with the Molly Bish murder which occurred several years later in the region. Neither has been named as a suspect in the case, however.
- Đuro Kurepa (86), a Yugoslav mathematician who wrote more than 700 academic papers and 1,000 scientific reviews on scientific theory, was beaten to death by thugs in front of his apartment in Belgrade on 2 November 1993. His killers have never been captured.
- Raúl Esnal (37) was a football defender from Uruguay, who was murdered on 15 December 1993, in El Salvador, on the road between Ahuachapán and Acajutla. The murder case has never been solved.
- David Cox (27) was a U.S. Marine involved in a 1986 hazing incident which was later dramatized in the film A Few Good Men; he was the only Marine accused to avoid any punishment after he was acquitted by a court martial. On 5 January 1994, five years after he was honorably discharged, Cox was last seen at his home in Medfield, Massachusetts, by his girlfriend as she left for work in the morning; when she returned there were some signs that there might have been a struggle and Cox may have left the house in haste. Almost three months later, his body was found, partially clad in Marine-issued clothing which his family says he had not worn since returning to civilian life, in woods just off the Charles River, shot several times. While police believe he accompanied his killer or killers willingly, they found it unlikely that he was willingly walking a half-mile (800 m) from the nearest road through woods with 8 in (200 mm) of newly fallen snow to the site where his body was found wearing just sneakers. Theories as to possible suspects range from former Marines to co-workers to bookies he owed money to. The investigation is continuing.
- Sergei Dubov (54) was a Russian journalist, publisher and entrepreneur; The Independent called him a "brilliant businessman". He was murdered in Moscow on 1 February 1994. The assassin waited in a phone booth; when Dubov was going to his car in the morning, he was shot in the back of the head. Earlier, Dubov had received threats by telephone and by mail. Dubov's son, Sergei Dubov Jr, aged 15, was killed the year before by being thrown from a 14th floor window. Both murders remain unsolved as their killers are unknown.
- Miran Hrovatin (44) was an Italian photographer and camera operator killed in Mogadishu, Somalia, together with the Italian journalist Ilaria Alpi (32), under mysterious circumstances on 20 March 1994. In 2000, Somali citizen Hashi Omar Hassan was convicted and sentenced to 26 years in prison for the double murder. In October 2016, a court in Perugia, Italy, reversed the conviction and Hassan was awarded more than three million euros for the wrongful conviction and nearly 17 years he had spent in prison. Both of the murders remain unsolved.
- Rwandan president Juvénal Habyarimana (57) and Burundian president Cyprien Ntaryamira (39) were both killed, alongside ten other people, when their plane was shot down over Kigali by a surface-to-air missile on 6 April 1994. The assassination was the spark that ignited the Rwandan genocide. Responsibility for the attack is disputed, with most theories proposing as suspects either the Tutsi rebel Rwandan Patriotic Front (RPF) or government-aligned Hutu Power followers opposed to negotiation with the RPF. The true perpetrator remains a mystery.
- Dada Vujasinović (30) was a Serbian journalist and reporter for the news magazine Duga, published in Belgrade. Vujasinović was found dead in her apartment on 8 April 1994, and the murder remains unsolved.
- The Inokashira Park dismemberment incident happened in Japan on 23 April 1994; the people responsible for it remain unknown.
- Rachel Gray (4) was brought to the Kino Community Hospital in south Tucson, Pima County, Arizona on 2 May 1994 from her home in the Desert Vista Trailer Park on East Benson Highway, showing signs of sexual assault and a fatal abdominal injury of unknown origin; Barry Jones, the boyfriend of her mother, was convicted of the assault and first-degree murder, for which he was sent to death row. However, questions were later raised about the medical evidence and timing of the assault given Jones' whereabouts, and it was later shown that he could not have been the perpetrator. Although appeals courts recommended a new trial, exoneration was made more difficult by the Supreme Court's ruling in the Shinn v. Ramirez case, that complicated introduction of new evidence not already presented in a state case; the state later changed his conviction to second-degree murder considering a failure to bring the girl into the hospital in a more timely fashion given clearly severe injuries, and he was released as a result of time served for the overturned conviction, one of the longest periods (29 years) for a sentence that was later vacated. As a result of the vacated judgment, Rachel Gray's case is now open again, with re-examination of the original evidence and any subsequent leads to find the actual perpetrator of the assault.
- Provisional IRA volunteer Martin Doherty was gunned down on 21 May 1994 while attempting to prevent members of the Ulster Volunteer Force planting a bomb in the Widow Scallans pub in Dublin.
- Savaş Buldan (32–33), a Turkish citizen of Kurdish descent, was kidnapped, tortured and killed on 3 June 1994. The murder has never been solved.
- Nicole Brown Simpson (35) and Ronald Goldman (25) were found dead with multiple stab wounds in front of Simpson's condo in the Brentwood section of Los Angeles late on the night of 12 June 1994. Her ex-husband, former professional football star O. J. Simpson, was arrested and charged with the crime two days later; after an eight-month trial covered heavily by the media, in which the defense argued that there had been extensive mishandling of the evidence and that some investigators were racially biased, he was acquitted. However, strong public sentiment remained that he was guilty, and he was held liable in a suit by the victims' families later. No other suspects have ever been officially named.
- David Cullen Bain of Dunedin, New Zealand, was initially convicted of the 20 June 1994 murder of his parents and three siblings at their home. Prosecutors claimed he had staged the crime to look like his father had committed a murder-suicide of his family while David was out delivering papers; his defence claimed that murder-suicide was exactly what had happened. With help from former rugby star Joe Karam, David pursued appeals and was eventually acquitted after a 2009 retrial. Other than David and his father, no other person was suspected.
- On July 7, 1994, Bodies of Linda Gibson (21) and Cody Lee Garrett (4) were discovered in high weeds on the edge of a field in Somerset, Kentucky, On July 3, Linda and Cody were last seen walking at a Dairy Mart on Bourne Ave in Somerset, Kentucky, Some witnesses state that were seen possibly entering a vehicle on Bourne Ave, Family members began concerned and reported them as missing to the Somerset Police Department the next day. No arrests have been made, However, police have found possible suspects.
- Mehdi Dibaj (58–59) was an Iranian former Muslim who later became a Christian pastor, whose body was discovered west Tehran in a park on 5 July 1994. after he had been murdered by unknown members of Iran's regime.
- The Gentleman of Heligoland was found beaten and weighed down in waters west of Heligoland on 11 July 1994.
- The 18 July 1994 suicide bombing of a Jewish organization's building in Buenos Aires killed 85, surpassing the similar attack on the Israeli embassy two years earlier as Argentina's deadliest terror attack. Five suspects, four of whom were local police officers, were acquitted in a 2004 trial; the investigating judge was removed from the case and later impeached after it was disclosed that he had paid for evidence. British authorities arrested an Iranian suspect named by Argentina in 2003, but declined to extradite him due to weak evidence. No other suspects have been named although investigations continue, one of which has since led to the unsolved murder of Alberto Nisman, the investigating prosecutor.
- The day after that bombing, another suicide bomber brought down a plane in Panama, killing 21, 12 of whom were Jews. While an apparently fictitious Arab terrorist organization claimed responsibility, no suspects have ever been identified.
- Irish crime boss Martin "The General" Cahill (45) was shot and killed at a Dublin intersection on 18 August 1994. The Provisional IRA claimed responsibility, citing Cahill's dealings with the Ulster Volunteer Force; however, it has also been reported that the IRA took exception to this only after being paid by two of Cahill's subordinates who were not eager to share profits from a drug operation with him. No arrests have ever been made.
- Sonya Cywink (31), from London in Ontario, Canada and a member of the indigenous Whitefish River First Nation from Manitoulin Island, vanished on 26 August 1994 and was found murdered on August 30. She was 24 weeks pregnant and showed signs of blunt force trauma. Despite progress in the case in intervening years, police have since been unable to declare a specific suspect or suspects. Her case has helped to draw attention to the hundreds of cases of murdered or missing indigenous women in the country since 1980, and the work to tackle the many unsolved cases in Ontario and other provinces.
- Dmitry Kholodov (27) was a Russian journalist who investigated corruption in the military and was assassinated on 17 October 1994, in Moscow. His assassination was the first of many killings of journalists in Russia. The murder remains unsolved.
- Johan Heyns (66), an Afrikaner Calvinist theologian, was shot and killed from outside his house in Pretoria, South Africa's capital, while playing cards with his wife and grandchildren on 5 November 1994. While no suspects have ever been identified, it is widely believed the killing was the work of radical white supremacists unhappy with Heyns' increasingly liberal political views, which in addition to opposition to apartheid had also called for tolerance of homosexuals.
- Segametsi Mogomotsi (14) was a schoolgirl who was found murdered on 6 November 1994, in Mochudi, Botswana. Her body was found mutilated in an open space. The discovery was followed by many protests at the school she attended. Her murder remains unsolved to this day.
- Igor Platonov (60) was a Ukrainian–Soviet Grandmaster of chess (Soviet Union Grandmaster, Гроссмейстер СССР). He was active between 1958 and 1984, with his best years from 1967 to 1972, when he earned the Soviet Union Grandmaster title. On 13 November 1994, he was murdered in his Kyiv apartment by two thieves. The identities of the killers remain unknown.

== 1995–1999 ==
- Anders Gustafsson (16) was murdered on New Year's Day on 1 January 1995 after disappearing from a New Year's Eve party at the Fryshuset youth centre in Stockholm, Sweden. Despite extensive investigations into possible links to skinhead groups and ideological conflicts, several suspects and theories, and renewed forensic examinations, the case remains unsolved, and his missing hand has never been found.
- Melanie Carpenter (23) was a Canadian woman who was abducted and murdered in Surrey, British Columbia, on 6 January 1995. Carpenter was taken from her workplace and found dead in the Fraser Canyon several weeks later; the prime suspect, Fernand Auger, committed suicide before arrest.
- Lazım Esmaeili (49–50) was a Kurdish Iranian spy and Askar Simitko (41–42), a spy who were both operating in Turkey were both found tortured and shot dead on 28 January 1995, by unknown persons in Istanbul.
- Vladislav Listyev (38) was a Russian journalist and head of the ORT TV Channel. On the evening of 1 March 1995, when returning from the live broadcast of his evening show Chas Pik, Listyev was shot dead on the stairs of his apartment building by persons unknown.
- Michael Gerardi (25) of Slidell, Louisiana, was shot to death in a robbery by three men on 2 March 1995 outside the Port of Call restaurant in New Orleans' French Quarter, for which Shareef Cousin, then 16, was convicted and sent to death row largely on the basis of eyewitness testimony. Four years later, after errors and misconduct in the prosecution's case were identified (with exculpatory evidence withheld), Cousin's murder conviction was vacated, and the case was re-opened to identify the perpetrator of the robbery and murder outside the restaurant; no other suspects have yet been identified.
- Gianfranco Cuccuini (65) was an Italian pensioner who was murdered by an unknown assailant inside a bookshop in Florence.
- Deanna Cremin (17), from Somerville, Massachusetts, United States, was murdered on 30 March 1995. Her body was found behind a senior housing complex. An autopsy revealed she had been strangled. She was last seen alive by her boyfriend who, unlike on other occasions when he would walk her to the door, walked her only halfway and she continued on her own toward her house. Her murder remains unsolved.
- The body of Lindsay Rimer (13), originally from Hebden Bridge, West Yorkshire, England, was found in the Rochdale Canal between Manchester and Sowerby Bridge five months after she disappeared following a visit to a local Spar Supermarket to buy corn flakes. She had been strangled and her body weighed down with a concrete block. Despite repeated appeals for information by police, her murder remains unsolved.
- Ramapiram Kannickaisparry (39) was a Singaporean production operator of Apple Computer who was found murdered at a forest near Sembawang on 17 April 1995. The woman had thirteen stab wounds on her head and neck, and also sustained broken ribs and pelvis, which was due to a vehicle repeatedly running over her body. Her lover Nadasan Chandra Secharan was initially arrested and sentenced to death in 1996, but later acquitted of her murder upon Nadasan's appeal in 1997 due to the prosecutors' weak and insufficient evidence against him, and he was thus released. As a result, the murder remains unsolved till today and the real killer(s) remains unidentified.
- Vasil Iliev (30), a Bulgarian former wrestler, businessman and influential mobster, was shot dead while driving to his favorite restaurant in Sofia on 25 April 1995. The high-profile nature of the killing indicates that it was related to organized crime, but nobody was ever arrested.
- In June 2019, the Police discovered burnt human remains in McComb, Mississippi that might have belonged to Donald Izzett (44), who disappeared in May 1995 whose case is now being regarded as a murder.
- On 25 June 1995, Lim Shiow Rong (6), a schoolgirl, was found raped and murdered at a drain in Jalan Woodbridge, Singapore. Her suspected killer was said to be a male customer who often came to Lim's mother's coffee shop to have drinks, and claimed to be a friend of her father. However, the suspect, who never re-appeared since Lim's murder, was never found despite police investigations. As there was no statute of limitations for criminal cases like murder in Singapore, the police investigations remained unclosed, and until today, the murder of Lim remains unsolved.
- Michael Ljunggren (33), president of the Bandidos Motorcycle Club in Sweden, was shot and killed by a sniper while riding his motorcycle on the E4 motorway, south of Markaryd, Småland on 17 July 1995. No-one has been charged with his murder, although it is believed that he was killed by a member of the rival Hells Angels Motorcycle Club in relation to the Nordic Biker War that was occurring at the time.
- Luigia Borrelli (42), Italian nurse who after last being seen having breakfest at a bar in Genoa, Italy on 5 September 1995 was found dead after being killed by unknown persons.
- Michael Nigg (26), an aspiring actor and waiter at a Los Angeles restaurant, was shot and killed during an attempted robbery on 8 September 1995, while withdrawing money from an ATM. Three suspects were arrested a month later, but released for lack of evidence and the case remains unsolved. Since Nigg was a friend of Ronald Goldman, with whom he had worked, and seemed to live quite well for someone in his position, leading to some reports that he was involved in drug trafficking, his death has been used to support theories that the murders of Goldman and O. J. Simpson's ex-wife Nicole the year before were drug-related as well.
- The 1995 Palo Verde, Arizona derailment is an incident that took place when Amtrak's Sunset Limited was derailed by saboteurs on Southern Pacific Railroad tracks that happened close to Palo Verde, Arizona on 9 October 1995, that killed car attendant Mitchell Bates while he was sleeping. Whoever was behind this was unknown.
- Victoria Cafasso (20) was an Italian tourist found stabbed 17 times with some of her clothing missing on Beaumaris Beach in Tasmania on 11 October 1995.
- Three people – Diane Jones (21) and her daughters Shauna (2) and Sarah-Jane (13 months) – were killed in an arson attack in Gurnos, Wales, on 11 October 1995. Two women – Annette Hewins and Donna Clarke – were jailed for the crime, but their convictions were later quashed on appeal and they were released. The investigation was re-opened in 2025.
- Gojko Zec (60) was a Serbian football manager. He coached OFK Beograd, FK Partizan, FK Borac Banja Luka, NK Rijeka, Red Star Belgrade, Aris, Yugoslavia FK Borac Čačak. He was murdered during an armed robbery on 3 November 1995, in Luanda, Angola.
- A body found in Greece and thought to be a murder victim was believed to be that of Bruno Bréguet (45), who last seen on 12 November 1995, after he disappeared at sea. This was not proven, and the murder case remains unsolved.
- Rapper Randy Walker (27), better known as Stretch, was shot and killed by the occupants of a vehicle passing his minivan in Queens Village, New York, shortly after midnight on 30 November 1995. No suspects have ever been identified, but it is often believed to be related to Tupac Shakur's later death, since it took place exactly one year after an apparent robbery attempt in which Shakur had been seriously injured.
- Randi Boothe-Wilson (34), originally referred to as the Jacksonville Jane Doe, was found on 6 December 1995, in Jacksonville, North Carolina. She remained unidentified until February 2019, when her DNA was matched to Randi Boothe-Wilson, who had last been seen in Greenburgh, New York on 26 October 1994.
- A dog that belonged to a family in North Port, Florida came home with a male human skull on 1 January 1996. The police were eventually able to put together much of its skeleton and concluded that it had its genitalia removed by being cut out, similar to another 1994 murder victim. The skeleton from North Port remains unidentified, and is thought to be a victim of Daniel Conahan, yet its killer is unknown.

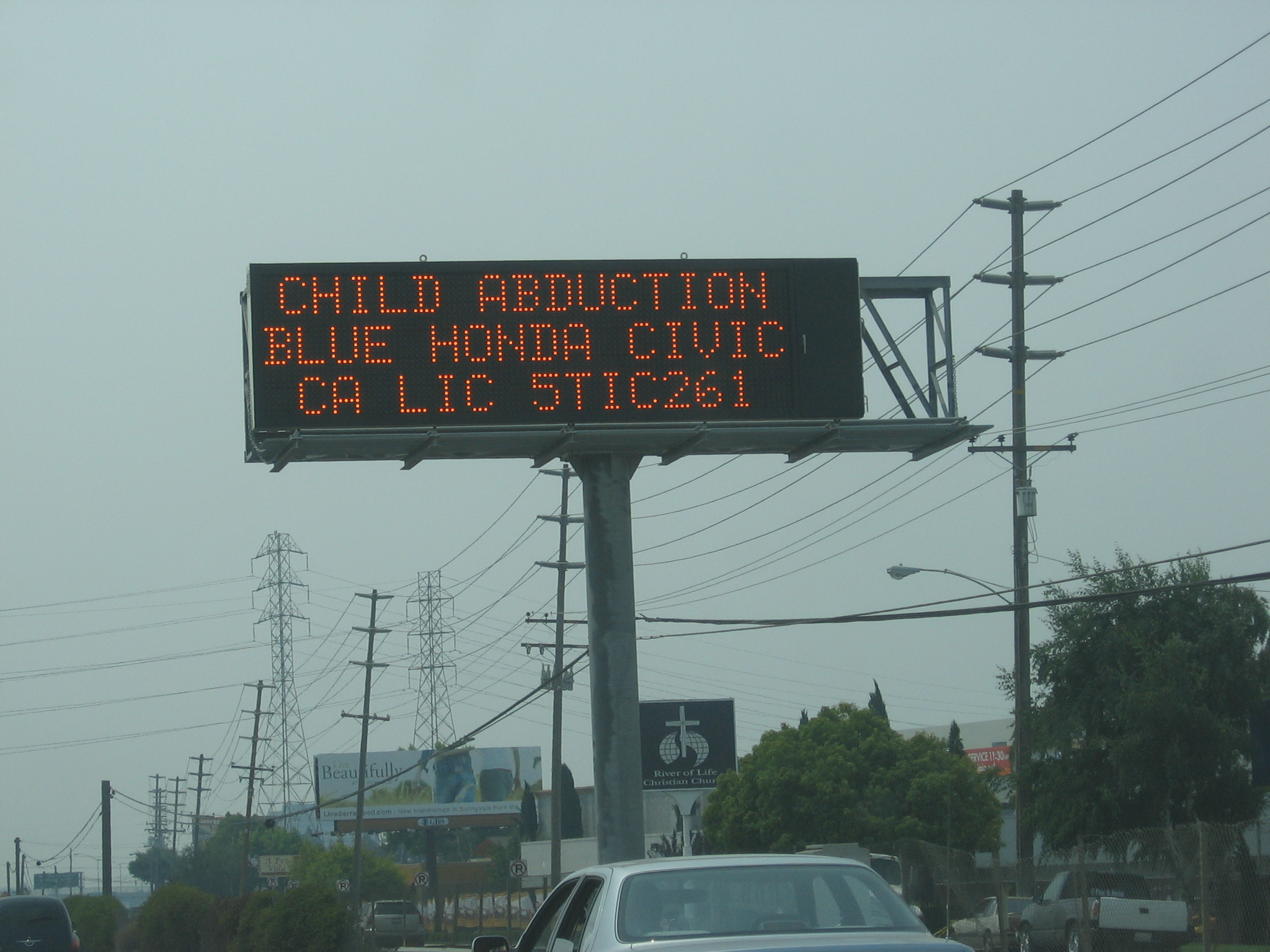
The Amber alert child abduction alert system, implemented across America, is named after nine-year-old Amber Hagerman.

- Amber Hagerman (9) was abducted on 13 January 1996, while riding her bike near her grandparents' home in Arlington, Texas. Four days later, a man walking his dog found her body in a creek bed. An autopsy revealed that her throat had been cut. Although a $75,000 reward was offered for information leading to Hagerman's killer, the perpetrator was never found. Her murder would later inspire the creation of the Amber alert system.
- Diao Aiqing (19), a student at Nanjing University, China, disappeared after leaving her dormitory on 10 January 1996. Her brutally mutilated remains, more than 2,000 of them, were discovered nine days later at various location. Little evidence of her killer have been found and the case remains open.
- The body of Barbara Barnes (13), from Steubenville, Ohio, was found strangled on a riverbed on 22 February 1996, more than two months after she was last seen walking to school. Some of her relatives have been suspected, but the case remains open.
- Bob Mellors (49), a British gay rights activist who was involved with the Gay Liberation Front (GLF) in New York during the 1970s, was stabbed to death in his flat in Warsaw, Poland during a burglary. No suspects have ever been identified.
- Kutlu Adalı (60–61) was a Turkish Cypriot journalist, poet, socio-political researcher, and peace advocate who on 6 July 1996, was fatally machine-gunned outside his home. Some sources state the Grey Wolves are responsible for his death; however, another source states the Turkish Revenge Brigade is responsible. To this day, the perpetrators of this crime are yet to be brought to justice
- On 11 July 1996, the half-naked body of Canadian Blair Adams (31) was found in a parking lot in Knoxville, Tennessee; scattered around his body was German, Canadian, and U.S. currency, totaling nearly $4,000. Authorities believe he knew no one in Tennessee, and investigators retracing his steps found the way he arrived made as little sense as the way he died.
- Paulo Cesar Farias (50) and Suzana Marcolino were both found dead, shot by a .38 Special caliber Rossi revolver in Farias's beach house in Maceió, Brazil on 23 June 1996. The deaths were at first ruled as suicide, but it was later said to be a murder which has yet to be solved.
- Jan Krogh Jensen (37), a Danish member of the Bandidos Motorcycle Club, was shot and killed on 16 July 1996, in Mjøndalen, Norway. A member of the rival Hells Angels Motorcycle Club was prosecuted for the murder but later acquitted in court.
- Seagram (26), an American rapper who released two albums during his lifetime, was killed in a drive-by shooting on 31 July 1996, in Oakland, California. His killer(s) have never been apprehended.
- Ramzan Khadzhiev (40), chief of the Northern Caucasus bureau of Russian Public Television who on 11 August 1996 was killed as being shot by unknown soldiers in Grozny.
- On the morning of 13 August 1996, Indonesian journalist Udin (33) was beaten to death at his home with a metal rod by two men who gained entry by claiming they wanted to leave a motorcycle with him for safekeeping; they then fled on that motorcycle. The investigation became a political issue with opponents of the Suharto regime claiming the dictator himself or other government officials were behind it as retaliation for his reporting on their misdeeds, while the government and police suggested it had been the work of a jealous husband. A suspect arrested on the latter theory was later acquitted, protesting his innocence as his trial revealed some investigation shortcomings, among them that he had been pressured to confess. The police have declined to investigate the case further, saying their responsibility was fulfilled when they arrested the original suspect.
- Nigerian businesswoman Bisoye Tejuoso (80), daughter of a former Egba tribal chief, was assassinated on 19 September 1996, during a dispute over the tribe's obaship. The killers have never been identified.
- Choe Deok-geun (53), a South Korean consular official was murdered in Vladivostok on 1 October 1996 by suspected North Korean agents. The assailants were never caught.
- Per Häggström (25), a KTH Royal Institute of Technology student was stabbed to death in Stockholm, Sweden on 14 October 1996, shortly after leaving a student party. Despite extensive investigations, several leads and the 2013 arrest of a suspect, no one has been charged or convicted in connection with the murder.
- Andrey Lukanov (58), a Bulgarian politician who served as the final Prime Minister of the People's Republic of Bulgaria, was assassinated in his Sofia apartment on 2 October 1996. While several men were tried for his murder, they were later found to be innocent and released, leaving the case unsolved.
- April Dawn Lacy (14), who was previously known as the "Brush Girl" before being identified, is a female murder victim discovered in Decatur, Texas on 8 October 1996 after disappearing on 5 October 1996. Her murder remains unsolved.
- Christelle Blétry (16), French teenage girl was found dead in a ditch on the edge of a country road in Blanzy on 18 December 1996 after being stabbed multiple times. Her killer is unknown.
- JonBenét Ramsey (6), an American girl who had competed in child beauty pageants, was found dead in the basement of her parents' home in Boulder, Colorado, on 26 December 1996, nearly eight hours after a ransom note was apparently found and she was reported missing. The coroner listed cause of death as "asphyxia due to strangulation, associated with" a broken skull and concussion. Police suspected the parents of staging the ransom note and strangulation to cover up an accidental killing by either the mother or nine-year-old brother. A 1999 grand jury recommended charging the parents with obstruction and endangerment, but the district attorney declined to prosecute. Discovery of trace DNA from an unknown male in 2003 led a new district attorney in 2008 to write an apology to the Ramseys, declaring them "cleared of any involvement". Contradictory evidence seems to support both the family and outside intruder theories, and after several independent investigations, the case is still unsolved as of February 2020.
- Ahmad Tafazzoli (59) was an Iranian Iranist and professor of ancient Iranian languages and culture at Tehran University, who was found in January 1997 in Punak, a suburb northwest of Tehran. He had been murdered and the case remains unsolved.
- On 5 February 1997, Richard Aderson (47), a school administrator from LaGrange, New York, had a minor collision with another driver just before crossing the Newburgh-Beacon Bridge along Interstate 84. Across the river, just outside Fishkill, the two pulled over to exchange information. After they argued briefly, the other driver shot Aderson. He was able to describe the assailant and his vehicle before dying at the scene. A sketch has been circulated, but no suspect has ever been identified.
- Ali Forney (22), an advocate for homeless LGBT youth in the New York neighborhood of Harlem, was found shot dead on a street there on 5 February 1997. The case remains unsolved.
- Yi Han-yong (36), a North Korean defector who was also the nephew of the country's leader, Kim Jong Il was shot dead by suspected North Korean agents on 25 February 1997 in Seongnam, South Korea. The assailants were never caught.
- Ebrahim Zalzadeh (47–48) was an Iranian editor and author who mysteriously disappeared on 22 February 1997 and was found dead on 29 March 1997 in a morgue in Tehran after being murdered. Whoever killed Zalzadeh is unknown.
- The Notorious B.I.G., an American rapper, was killed by an unknown assailant in a drive-by shooting on 9 March 1997, in Los Angeles. Even though a composite sketch of the perpetrator was made, the case is still unsolved.
- Yasuko Watanabe (39) was a senior economic researcher at the Tokyo Electric Power Company (TEPCO), moonlighting as a prostitute on the streets by night who disappeared on 9 March 1997. She fell victim to murder by strangulation by an unknown assailant; after being reported missing from home by her mother, with whom she lived, her body was discovered on 19 March 1997 in a vacant apartment in the Maruyamachō neighborhood of Shibuya, Tokyo.
- Jaidyn Leskie (1) was an Australian child who was kidnapped and murdered on 15 June 1997. On 1 January 1998, his body was found in a lake far from his home. Despite leads, and the arrest and trial of a prime suspect, his murder remains unsolved.
- Star Stowe (40), whose real name was "Ellen Louise Stowe", was a model who achieved much success working for Playboy magazine. She was found murdered in Coral Springs, Florida on 16 March 1997 by someone whose identity is not known.
- Two Polish university students, Anna Kembrowska (22) and Robert Odżga (25), were murdered on 17 August 1997 while hitchhiking in Table Mountains. They were both executed by a shot in the back of the head. Number of theories were made, including involvement of a neo Nazi group, but the case remains unsolved.
- Bones found on a hillside by hunters in Pisgah National Forest near Asheville, North Carolina, on 7 September 1997, were later identified as those of Judy Smith (50), a nurse from Newton, Massachusetts, who had last been seen five months earlier at a Philadelphia hotel where she was accompanying her husband at a legal conference. Cutting marks on the bones, along with slash and puncture marks on a bra found near the body, led investigators to conclude she had been stabbed to death. The case remains open.
- Jane Thurgood-Dove (34) was shot outside her car, in full view of her young children, as she pulled into the driveway of her home in the Melbourne suburb of Niddrie on 6 November 1997; the killer escaped into a waiting getaway car which was found burnt shortly afterwards not too far away. Her husband and a police official believed to have been infatuated with her have been eliminated as suspects. More recently a theory has been floated that the killers were members of a local biker gang who had mistaken her for their real target, another local woman of similar appearance married to a fellow criminal. Police believe that the shooter and getaway car driver have since died of a heart attack and boating accident, respectively; they have offered the remaining participant immunity if he testifies against the man who they believe ordered the killing.
- Eileen Costello O'Shaughnessy (47) was beaten to death on 30 November 1997 while working as a taxi driver in Galway city, Ireland. Her murder remains unsolved.
- Dini Haryati (19), an Indonesian student and hotel receptionist based in Singapore, was found murdered in a forested area nearby Woodlands MRT station on 6 January 1998, two days after she disappeared. Dini was last seen by a colleague, who saw Dini leaving her workplace before her untimely death. An autopsy report certified that Dini was raped before she was brutally bludgeoned to death, and she died due to a skull fracture. Despite the extensive police investigations, the murder remains unsolved as of today.
- Australian organized-crime boss Alphonse Gangitano (40), the "Black Prince of Lygon Street", was found in his home dead from gunshot wounds shortly before midnight on 16 January 1998, the first of the Melbourne gangland killings. Graham Kinniburgh and Jason Moran, both of whom were believed to have been in Gangitano's home that night, were suspected. They were both murdered later themselves. No arrests have been made. The majority of Melbourne gangland killings murders are still unsolved as well, although police from the Purana Taskforce believe that Carl Williams was responsible for ten of them.
- Stephanie Crowe (12) was found stabbed to death in her bedroom in Escondido, California on the morning of 21 January 1998. Since there were no signs of forced entry, police focused on and eventually arrested her older brother Michael and two friends; however, charges against them were abruptly dismissed when later lab tests found several drops of Crowe's blood on a local transient. He was tried and convicted, but the conviction was overturned on appeal and a 2013 retrial acquitted him. The Crowe family reached a legal settlement with San Diego County over the wrongful prosecution of their son. No other suspects have been named.
- Vjekoslav Ćurić (40), a Bosnian Franciscan friar and humanitarian known for his work in aiding the victims of the 1994 Rwandan genocide, was murdered under unclear circumstances in Kigali on 31 January 1998. No suspects have ever been identified.
- Fat Pat (27), whose real name was Patrick Hawkins, was an American rapper from Houston, Texas who was murdered on 4 February 1998, in the very city that he was from by persons unknown. The murder remains unsolved.
- Father Alfred Kunz (56), a Roman Catholic priest, was found with his throat cut on 4 March 1998, in his Dane, Wisconsin, church. A wide pool of initial suspects was narrowed to one unnamed individual by 2009, whom police say they still track in the hope that eventually they will have enough evidence to arrest.
- In the predawn hours of 15 March 1998, the body of Hans Plüschke (59) was found in the countryside 70 metres (230 ft) from his car near Wiesenfeld in central Germany. He had been shot through the right eye. Since no money or valuables were taken, this led to theories that the killer or killers had intended to avenge the death of Rudi Arnstadt, an East German border guard Plüschke had killed with a similar shot during a 14 August 1962, shootout during Plüschke's service as a West German border guard, which got him sentenced to 25 years in prison in absentia by an East German court; West Germany insisted the shooting had been justified as return fire and never extradited him. Plüschke had publicly identified himself as the shooter two years earlier and reportedly received regular death threats afterwards. A Special Commission formed by the German police to investigate was dissolved a year later when it exhausted all its leads; the case remains open.
- On 25 March 1998, NASCAR driver Chris Trickle (24) died of injuries sustained in a Las Vegas drive-by shooting on 9 February 1997. A quirk in Nevada law at the time meant that the gunmen could not be prosecuted for his murder, since his death had occurred more than a year and a day after the attack; it was subsequently changed. No suspects have ever been identified, and the case is considered cold.
- Radovan Stojičić (45–46), a Serbian police general and head of the Public Security Service, was killed at a restaurant in Belgrade on 11 April 1997. The motive for the killing is unclear.
- Tristan Brübach (13) was last seen alive at Frankfurt Höchst railway station on 26 March 1998, at 3:20 pm. Later that afternoon, his dead body was found near the railway station. He had been knocked unconscious and choked, and parts of his body had been cut out. The cause of death was a cut in the throat. The murderer was never identified.
- Tomás Caballero Pastor (63) was a Spanish union leader and politician from Navarra. He was assassinated by the Basque separatist organization ETA on 6 May 1998. The murder remains unsolved.
- Akiel Chambers (11) was found dead in a pool after a birthday party the previous day in Port of Spain, Trinidad and Tobago, on 24 May 1998. He was determined to have been sexually abused prior to his murder. No suspect has ever been identified in the case.
- Sinéad Kelly (21) was a female Irish prostitute who was murdered on 22 June 1998 in the city of Dublin by unknown persons. Her killer has not yet been identified.
- Marek Papała (38), former Chief of Polish State Police, was shot in the head on 25 June 1998, while parking his car. In 2012, a former car thief turned state witness given immunity of prosecution came forward with the revelation that he had killed Papała. He also testified that some Polish mafia bosses had encouraged the crime. However, in 2013 the indictment against the mafia bosses was dropped due to numerous factual and logical inconsistencies. The murder of Papała remains unsolved.
- Jason (9), Mark (10), and Richard Quinn (11) were three Irish brothers who were killed on 12 July 1998 when their home in Ballymoney, County Antrim was firebombed by the Ulster Volunteer Force. The bombers were never apprehended, although one man was convicted of acting as a getaway driver.
- 29 people were killed in the Omagh bombing on 15 August 1998, when a car bomb was detonated in the town of Omagh in County Tyrone. The Real Irish Republican Army claimed responsibility. The only suspect ever convicted for the bombing, Republican dissident Colm Murphy, was acquitted on appeal eight years later, though he and three others had previously been found liable in civil court for the bombing. Another suspect was acquitted at trial and a third had the case against him withdrawn after a key witness's testimony collapsed.
- Hamid Hajizadeh (42), whose pen name was "Sahar", was an Iranian poet who on 22 September 1998 in Kerman, Iran was murdered with his young son. The case remains unsolved. The killing became known as the "chain murders". and also involved other writers as well.
- The 1998 abduction of foreign engineers in Chechnya happened on 3 October 1998, when four male specialists from the United Kingdom were seized by unidentified Chechen gunmen in Grozny, kidnapped and later killed. The killers remain unknown.
- Ita Martadinata Haryono (18), an Indonesian human rights activist, was found dead on 9 October 1998, in her bedroom in Central Jakarta, Indonesia. She had been stabbed ten times and her neck had been slashed. The murder occurred three days after a Jakarta press conference held by the human rights organizations she had been involved with.
- Galina Starovoitova (52) was a Soviet dissident, Russian politician and ethnographer known for her work to protect ethnic minorities and promote democratic reforms in Russia. She was shot to death in her apartment building on 20 November 1998, by persons unknown.
- Suzanne Jovin (21), a senior at Yale University, was found stabbed to death on 4 December 1998, on campus. Allegations that her thesis advisor was a suspect led to the end of his career at Yale, but the crime remains unsolved.
- Mohammad-Ja'far Pouyandeh (44) was an Iranian writer, translator and activist. He was a member of the Iranian Writers Association, a group that had been long banned in Iran due to their objection to censorship and encouraged freedom of expression. Pouyandeh was last seen alive leaving his office at four o'clock in the afternoon of 8 December 1998, and still had not returned home three days later when his wife wrote and delivered a letter to Iran's president expressing her anguish over his disappearance. His body was discovered on 11 December in the Shahriar district of Karaj, south of Tehran, and he appeared to have been strangled.
- Tito Díaz (28) was a Salvadoran professional footballer, who was shot dead in a bar in Santa Rosa de Lima on 12 December 1998. The murder remains unsolved.
- Rick DeVecchi (37) was an American trucker who was killed in an intentional hit and run in Berkeley, California on 17 December 1998. The suspect, described as an African-American whose car had the license plate "CUS", has never been apprehended.
- Bindy Johal (27) was a self-confessed drug trafficker who operated in British Columbia, Canada. On 20 December 1998, he was killed from behind at a crowded nightclub in Vancouver, British Columbia, by a person whose identity was and remains unknown.
- Kirsty Bentley (15), a teenage girl from Ashburton, New Zealand, went missing while walking her family dog in the afternoon on 31 December 1998; after an extensive search lasting several weeks, her body was found in dense scrub approximately 40 km (25 mi) away. Police consider the case to be a homicide, and it remains one of the highest-profile unsolved murders in New Zealand. Her killer has never been identified.
- Lois Roberts (37–38) was an Australian woman who was last seen outside The Nimbin Police Station on 31 July 1998. Her badly mutilated body was found about six months after her disappearance in January 1999. Her murder remains unsolved.
- On 6 January 1999, the mutilated and skinned remains of Polish college student Katarzyna Zowada (23) were recovered from the Vistula by the crew of a pusher tug. As more of Zowada's remains were recovered from the river, it was determined that she had been tortured and skinned alive, and her skin was prepared in such a way as to create a kind of bodysuit that the murderer was probably wearing. Though the Polish authorities were able to arrest a suspect in 2019 following the discovery of new information, he remains in custody while authorities continue searching for more evidence, and the case is still officially classified as unsolved.
- Jaki Byard (76) was an American composer and multi-instrumentalist renowned for his signature style of musical performances dating back to the late 1950s. On 11 February 1999, he was shot to death at his home in the Hollis neighborhood of New York City by an unknown assailant.
- Big L, whose real name was Lamont Coleman, was an American songwriter and rapper who was murdered on 15 February 1999, in his hometown of East Harlem, New York, after being shot multiple times by an unknown person. The murder remains unsolved.
- Agim Hajrizi (38), a Kosovo Albanian human rights activist and President of the Union of Independent Trade Unions of Kosova, was murdered along with his mother and son on 24 March 1999, by Serbian paramilitaries in Mitrovica. Nobody has been charged in their murders.
- The body of Immigration and Naturalization Service attorney Joyce Chiang (28) was found in the Potomac River in April 1999 by a canoeist, three months after she had last been seen. Washington police, who had initially called the case a suicide, later changed their minds and said it was a homicide. They have suspects, who are currently in prison, but have not publicly identified them.
- Slavko Ćuruvija (49), a Serbian journalist and newspaper publisher, was shot to death by two men in front of his house in Belgrade on 11 April 1999. While investigation into his murder is ongoing and suspects have been arrested, it officially remains unsolved.
- Jill Dando (37), an English journalist and television presenter who worked for the BBC for 14 years, including on Crimewatch, was killed by a single gunshot wound to the head on 26 April 1999, at her London home following a shopping trip, and after leaving the home of her fiancé earlier the same day. Her death sparked "Operation Oxborough", the biggest murder inquiry and largest criminal investigation since the hunt for the Yorkshire Ripper. The murder remains unsolved as of 2026.
- On 5 May 1999, 43-year-old Aw Teck Boon, a Singaporean seaman and notorious gang lord who headed the Sio Kun Tong gang, was found dead with three stab wounds on his neck, armpit and waist. Aw, who left behind a wife and daughter, was last seen drinking at a Geylang coffeeshop before he went to sleep at a nearby Wushu association club, and he was found murdered at the club shortly after. It was presumed that the murder happened as a result of monetary disputes or unsettled gangland conflicts. The coroner's court recorded a verdict of "murder by person or persons unknown" in 2002 after hearing the case. A suspect named Chew Tse Meng was placed on the wanted list by the Singapore Police Force, but Chew was never found despite extensive investigations, and the murder of Aw remains unsolved as of today.
- Fehmi Agani (67), a Kosovar sociologist, politician and strategist for the Democratic League of Kosovo, was abducted by Yugoslav security forces on 6 May 1999, while attempting to flee into Macedonia. His body was found several days later, but to this day, nobody has been charged in his killing.
- Vanessa Thiellon (17), French teenage girl was found dead on the banks of the Saône in Mâcon on 5 June 1999. Her killer is unknown.
- Ricky McCormick's body was found in a field by sheriff's officers in St. Charles County, Missouri, on 30 June 1999. The only clues to the mystery are two notes in his pockets, apparently written in a complex cipher.
- Ezzat Ebrahim-Nejad (24–25) was an Iranian student, poet and demonstrator who was shot and killed on 9 July 1999, in the attack by security forces on Tehran University dormitory, who preceded and provoked the July 1999 student riots in Iran. The case remains unsolved.
- Raonaid Murray (17), an Irish teenager, was stabbed to death within a few hundred metres of her home in Glenageary, Co. Dublin, in the early hours of Saturday, 4 September 1999.
- On 28 December 1999, a friend visiting the apartment of Larry Dale Lee (41), an American journalist in Guatemala City, found his body with multiple stab wounds. It was determined that he had been killed two days earlier, shortly after he was last seen alive. Police developed several theories of the crime but no arrests have ever been made.

== See also ==
- List of unsolved murders (before 1900)
- List of unsolved murders (1900–1979)
- List of unsolved murders (2000–present)
