= Cafasso =

Cafasso is a surname. Notable people with the surname include:

- Fernando Cafasso (born 1983), Argentine footballer
- Joseph Cafasso (1811–1860), Italian Roman Catholic priest
- Joseph A. Cafasso (born 1956), American consultant
- Victoria Cafasso (1975–1995), British/Italian tourist murdered in Australia
