= Devecchi =

Devecchi is an Italian surname. Notable people with the surname include:

- Fabien Devecchi (born 1975), French rugby league coach
- Giacomo Devecchi (born 1985), Italian basketball player
- José Devecchi (born 1995), Argentine footballer
- Robert P. DeVecchi (1930–2015), American diplomat

== See also ==
- Murder of Rick DeVecchi
