= Murder of Janie Perrin =

1990 unsolved murder case in Australia

Janie Perrin
- Born: 1917; Australia
- Died: 2 November 1990 (aged 72–73); Bourke, New South Wales, Australia
- Cause of death: Blunt force trauma
- Known for: Victim of an unsolved murder

The murder of Janie Perrin occurred on 2 November 1990, when Perrin, a 73-year-old grandmother was sexually assaulted and murdered in her home in Bourke, a town in the Far West of the Australian state of New South Wales.

The crime remains unsolved, and the New South Wales Government offers a reward of $100,000 for information leading to the arrest and conviction of those responsible.

== Crime ==
Police believe that shortly after 9 pm on 2 November 1990, after Perrin was last seen walking into her flat in Tarcoon Street, she was attacked by an unknown number of males who sexually assaulted her. Police believe Perrin was bludgeoned by her attackers and that a number of personal items belonging to Perrin were stolen.

== Investigation ==
Concerned neighbours contacted Police the following day, who discovered Perrin lying deceased in her unit. Strike Force Pollwood was subsequently formed. It has interviewed hundreds of people during the investigation and remains active. In November 2006, NSW Police doubled the reward to $100,000.

== See also ==
- List of unsolved murders (1980–1999)
