= Jorge Sangumba =

Angolan politician

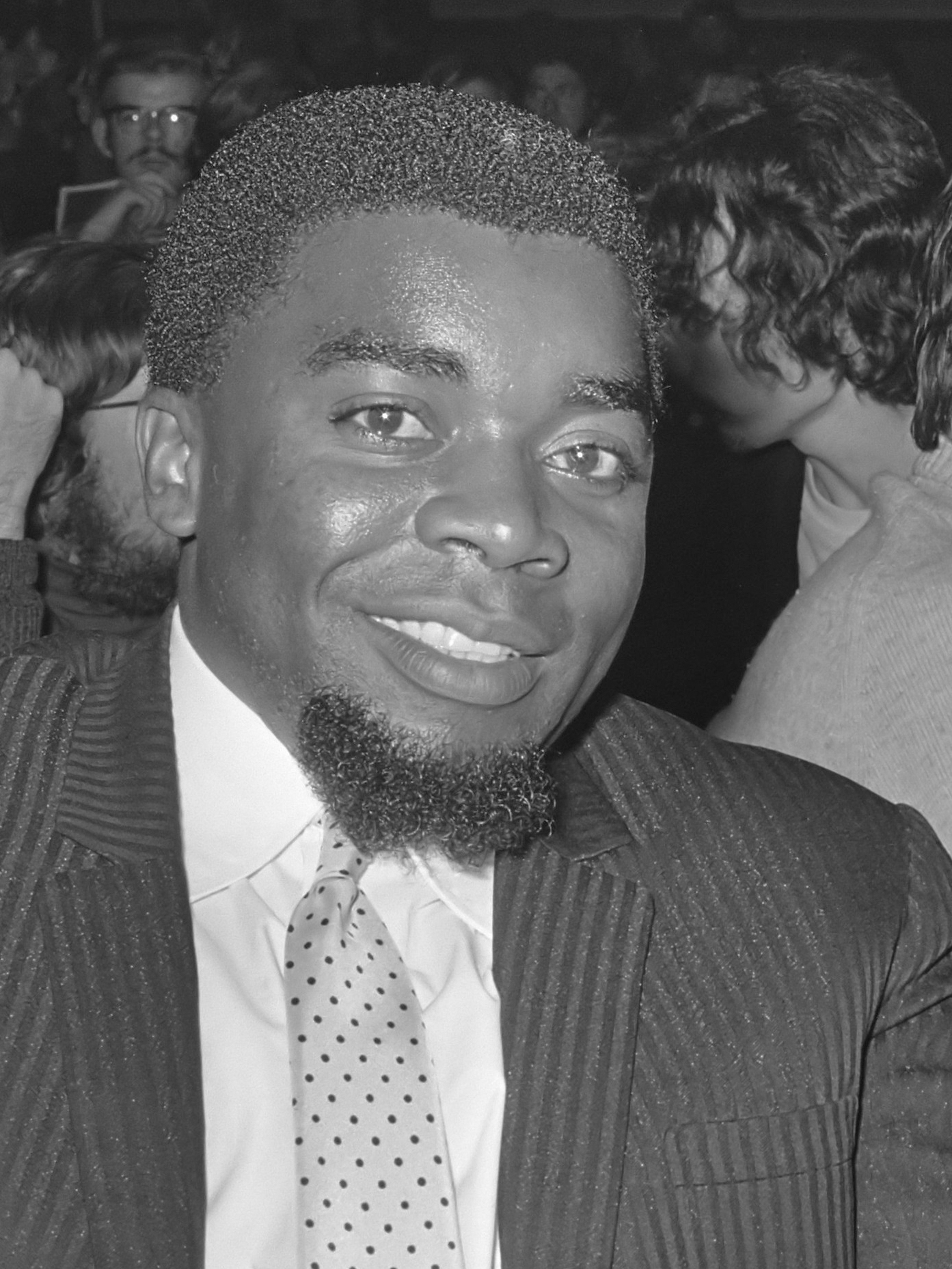
- Born: Jorge Ornelas Isaac Sangumba; 1944
- Died: 1982 (aged 37–38); Angola
- Cause of death: Homicide
- Occupation: Foreign Ministere during the Angolan War of Independence
- Known for: Assassination

Jorge Ornelas Isaac Sangumba (1944–1982) was the Foreign Minister of UNITA during the Angolan War of Independence.

== Background ==
Sangumba studied in the United States before joining the National Union of Angolan Students (UNEA) in the early 1960s. In 1965 he became UNEA's representative for external affairs, a precursor for his future appointment as the National Union for the Total Independence of Angola (UNITA's) Foreign Minister in August 1969.

On February 9, 1976, Sangumba officially announced that the central Angolan city of Huambo, where two Western-supported nationalist movements proclaimed the establishment of a government the previous November, had fallen to Soviet-supplied Angolan forces led by Cuban troops.

== Death and aftermath ==
Jonas Savimbi, the leader of UNITA, allegedly ordered Sangumba's assassination along with several other potential rivals for leadership of UNITA during the Angolan Civil War.

Sangumba's family has been trying to find the reasons that led to his murder, but have not found anything out. Tribute videos about him have been posted on sites such as YouTube.

== See also ==
- List of unsolved murders (1980–1999)
