= Tito Díaz =

Salvadoran footballer (1970-1998)

Personal information
- Full name: Óscar Armando Díaz
- Date of birth: 15 October 1970
- Place of birth: El Salvador
- Date of death: 12 December 1998 (aged 28)
- Place of death: Santa Rosa de Lima, El Salvador
- Position: Forward

Senior career*
| Years | Team | Apps | (Gls) |
| 1996 | Municipal Limeño | | |
| 1997–1998 | FAS | | |

International career
| 1997 | El Salvador | 1 | (0) |
- * Club domestic league appearances and goals

Óscar Armando Díaz (15 October 1970 – 12 December 1998), nicknamed Tito, was a Salvadoran professional footballer, prior to which had played football in High School.

== Club career ==
Nicknamed Tito, Díaz played for FAS, forming the forward line with Marlon Medrano, and Municipal Limeño.

== International career ==
Díaz made his debut for El Salvador in an April 1997 friendly match against Guatemala which proved to be his only international game. He was a non-playing squad member at the 1996 CONCACAF Gold Cup.

== Personal life and death ==
Díaz was the son of Delfina Díaz de Escobar and José Carmen Escobar. Díaz was shot dead in a bar in Santa Rosa de Lima on 12 December 1998. In his honour, Municipal Limeño decided to withdraw the no. 10 jersey. The murder has never been solved.

Díaz's son, Cristian Bustillo, played for FESA and joined C.D. Águila in September 2011.

== See also ==
- List of unsolved murders (1980–1999)
