= Murder of Victoria Cafasso =

1995 murder in Tasmania, Australia

Victoria Cafasso
- Born: Victoria Anna Elizabeth Cafasso; 8 June 1975; Surrey, England
- Died: 11 October 1995 (aged 20); Beaumaris, Tasmania, Australia
- Body discovered: Beaumaris Beach
- Burial place: Ospedaletti, Italy
- Citizenship: Dual British/Italian
- Occupation: Law student
- Known for: Unsolved murder victim

Victoria Cafasso was a 20-year-old dual British/Italian tourist on holiday in Tasmania, Australia. Her body was found stabbed on a beach at Beaumaris in broad daylight on 11 October 1995. As of 2020, nobody has been identified as her killer. A reward of A$100,000 was offered for information to help solve the crime. This was increased to A$500,000 by 2023, and to A$1,000,000 in October 2025.

== Background ==
Cafasso was born in England, and her maternal grandparents continued to live there. Her grandfather had been involved in politics in Rome in the 1970s, her father was a lawyer and her mother owned a travel agency. She lived with her parents and younger sister in Ospedaletti, Italy and was a dual citizen of England and Italy. She spoke fluent Italian, English and French.

Deciding to defer her university law studies, Cafasso arranged to travel to England to see her grandmother and then to Tasmania to visit her cousin, whom she had only met twice previously. She arrived in Launceston on the afternoon of 6 October. She was met there by her cousin and a friend of his visiting from Sydney. On the way to his home in Beaumaris, they stopped at Shelley's Lookout, overlooking Beaumaris Beach, where she met three other local residents. Over the following few days, she went for two short walks and attended a small social gathering with her cousin and otherwise remained at his home.

== Murder ==
On the morning of 11 October, Cafasso went out for another walk at around 9 am, heading towards the beach. She is believed to have been observed sun bathing on the beach at around 10 am.

Police estimated that over 50 people would have visited the beach between 8:30 am and the time her body was discovered, partially in the water, at about 1:30 pm. She was partly undressed (probably due to the scuffle) and had probably died between 11:30 am and 12:35 pm. Signs of a violent scuffle, and some of her belongings, were found 50 metres further up the beach. Other items, such as her missing bikini bottoms, towel, t-shirt, or the murder weapon, were never located.

The state coroner reported in 2005 that Cafasso had been violently attacked on the beach, initially defending herself from a blunt object which broke three of her teeth, but not from the following knife attack, suffering 17 stab wounds. The police response was also criticised as the scene was not quickly cordoned off, photo and video evidence was not taken, the body was moved and covered by a tarpaulin not at the scene, and forensic investigators did not attend.

== Media ==
Melanie Calvert, a Tasmanian author, wrote a book in 2014 about the crime called Tasmania's Beaumaris Beach Mystery: What Happened to Nancy and Victoria? which outlined three suspects: "the fisherman, the biker, and the doctor". Calvert also detailed the similarities to another case in 1993 at Beaumaris, the disappearance of 26 year old German tourist Nancy Grunwaldt.

In August 2023, as evidence from the case was being digitised, police reviewing the case identified a stronger link between a man seen running across the beach and a Subaru station wagon parked near the beach. They released new images and reconstructed video in an attempt to further jog someone's memory. The reward for information leading to a conviction was announced as A$500,000 by 2023.

== See also ==
- List of unsolved murders (1980–1999)
