= Murder of Sherry Ann Duncan =

1986 crime in Thailand

Sherry Ann Duncan
- Born: 1970; Thailand
- Died: July 22, 1986 (aged 15–16); Bangkok, Thailand
- Cause of death: Homicide
- Known for: Victim of unsolved murder
- Spouse: School student

The murder of Sherry Ann Duncan was a sensational crime that occurred in 1986 in Thailand. It is best known for the false incrimination of four suspects, some of whom died in prison during their nine years of incarceration, before being acquitted in 1995.

== Disappearance and murder ==
Duncan, a sixteen-year-old half-Thai/American student, was abducted after leaving her school in Bangkok on 22 July 1986; her body was found a few days later in wetlands in Samut Prakan Province. Four men were arrested, eventually convicted of murder, and sentenced to death in 1990. Later re-investigations by the Crime Suppression Division found evidence of false testimony by a key witness, and that the men had made forced confessions under duress. The convictions were overturned by the Supreme Court in 1995, but by then one of the wrongly accused men had died in prison, one had sustained permanent spinal injuries (due to beatings by the police to coerce a confession), and another died from tuberculosis shortly after release.

== Aftermath ==
Two men were later arrested and convicted for the murder. They implicated Suwiboon Patpongpanit for hiring them; she was convicted by the Court of First Instance but later acquitted by the Supreme Court in 1999 due to insufficient evidence. She was the daughter of Thailand's red light district czar, Udom Patpongpanit. The police officer who led the original investigation, Police Colonel Mongkol Sripho, was retroactively dishonourably discharged for fabricating evidence, but he had already retired and emigrated to the United States, and was not brought to face criminal charges.

In 2003, the Civil Court awarded the scapegoats and/or their descendants 26 million baht in damages. The case is often raised as an example of police corruption and the problems facing Thailand's justice system. It was adapted into a film (titled Sherry Ann and directed by Charoon Wattanasin) by Five Star Production in 2001.

== See also ==
- List of solved missing person cases: 1950–1999
- List of unsolved murders (1980–2000)
