= Murder of Akiel Chambers =

Trinidadian child murder victim (1987–1998)

Coordinates: 10.7229°N 61.5050°W

Akiel Chambers
- Born: Akiel Chambers; 4 January 1987
- Died: 23 May 1998 (aged 11); Haleland Park, Maraval, Port of Spain, Trinidad and Tobago
- Cause of death: Strangulation
- Body discovered: 24 May 1998

Akiel Chambers (4 January 1987 – 23 May 1998) was an 11-year-old boy who was murdered at a birthday party in Port of Spain, Trinidad and Tobago, in 1998.

As of 2026, nobody has been charged, and DNA evidence in the case has since been destroyed.

== Background ==
Akiel Chambers was born in 1987 and was raised by his aunt in Port of Spain, as his mother lived in England and his father lived in La Horquetta, Arima.

On 23 May 1998, a birthday party was being held for 11-year-old Carrie James at her family's home in the upscale suburb of Haleland Park in Maraval, Port of Spain. Present were six parents and about 25 to 30 children, including Akiel Chambers, who was a classmate of James.

As parents were supervising children swimming in the pool, James asked Chambers if he was going to join, to which Chambers replied no, as his aunt told him not to because he could not swim. Later, several of the children, including James and Chambers, went inside to play the PlayStation. After eating barbeque, Chambers returned to the room to play video games. James went to the room to find several children "making [a] mess" and ordered them all out. James claimed that at this point, Chambers came out near the pool, and that was the last time she saw him alive.

At 5:30 p.m., the party was wrapping up, and parents began to leave with their children. Chambers' aunt, Valerie Pascall, arrived to pick him up but could not locate him. According to one of the children, Chambers went next door, but he was not there. Pascall and other parents looked around the property and shouted for Chambers, to no avail.

== Investigation ==
Around midnight, police began an investigation and arrived at the James residence. Carrie provided a list of everyone present at the party, and, during the search, police dragged a pool stick along the bottom of the pool, noticing nothing awry.

The following day, Chambers was found by police submerged at the bottom of the pool in a crouched position, wearing only a man's swim trunks. Earlier in the morning, children had swum in the pool and not noticed anyone submerged in it.

Initially, his death was believed to be an accidental drowning. During the first autopsy, coroner Sherman Mc Nicolls noted that Chambers' anus was patulous, lax, and "subjected over a long period to repeated sexual intercourse". He did not take any anal swabs for evidence, as he did not believe the abuse was related to his death. During a second autopsy on 28 May, oral and anal swabs were taken.

In October 2003, 15-year-old Darnell Riley claimed that Chambers was next to him in the shallow end of the pool on the day of his disappearance. Riley, along with two other witnesses, was giving a testimony at the Port of Spain Eighth Magistrates' Court before Mc Nicolls. Riley stated that at the party, Chambers "appeared to be sad [...] everybody was having fun and he wasn't". He also claimed that the pool was "very clear" and that he did not at any point see Chambers sunken in the water.

Ramiese Mahadeo, who was also present at the party, stated during his testimony: "I asked [Chambers] if he was coming in. I told him to hurry up and change his clothes and come in. He said he couldn't come in." Mahadeo also told Mc Nicolls that the water was clear enough that anyone submerged would have been impossible to miss and that several parents looked into the pool during the initial search.

On 18 February 2004, Sherman Mc Nicolls ruled that Chambers did not die by accidental drowning, but by strangulation, and that he was later thrown into the pool.

== Later developments ==
According to Robert Sabga, former chairman of a 1997 task force investigating abuse at children's homes, an individual who holds a "very high office" in Trinidad was involved in a pedophile ring in the 1990s and was linked to the Chambers case.

As of 2026, the case remains unsolved, and many of the relatives and people present at the party have since left Trinidad. In 2022, David West, director of the Police Complaints Authority, stated: "There is not much that can be done now to find the perpetrators of this matter; unless someone comes forward and confesses, we are not going to get the evidence."

== See also ==
- List of unsolved murders (1980–1999)
