= Ramzan Khadzhiev =

Chechen writer (1955–1996)

Ramzan Khadzhiev (russ: Хаджиев Рамзан: 14 November 1955 – 11 August 1996) was chief of the Northern Caucasus bureau of Russian Public Television (ORT). Khadzhiev was the 19th journalist to die in the 20-month-old Chechen war.

On 11 August 1996 Khadzhiev was killed while attempting to leave Grozny, the embattled capital of Chechnya, by car with his wife and young son. He was shot in the head after being cleared through a Russian military checkpoint. ORT reported that Chechen rebels targeted Khadzhiev, an ethnic Chechen, because he supported the Moscow-installed government. However, a passenger in their car told Russia's NTV television that they instead came under fire from the Russian armored vehicles.

Later, his colleagues had confirmed that he was shot in the head twice by Russian federal soldiers. No investigation has been launched, and ORT has not pursued any public inquiry.

== See also ==
- List of unsolved murders (1980–1999)
