= Murder of Clare Morrison =

Murder of a 13-year-old Australian girl (1992)

- Born: c. 1979
- Died: 18 December 1992; Geelong, Victoria, Australia
- Cause of death: Strangulation
- Body discovered: Bells Beach, Victoria
- Occupation: Student
- Known for: Victim of unsolved murder

Clare Morrison was a 13-year-old Australian girl who was murdered on 18 December 1992 in Geelong, Victoria. Her near-naked body was discovered by surfers early morning on 19 December near Bells Beach, bashed, strangled and shark-bitten. As of 2022, the murder remains unsolved.

== Death ==
Morrison was last seen on the evening of 18 December in Geelong Mall, telling her friend that she would take the bus home to get money for Christmas shopping. Some witnesses also claimed that she "appeared to be drunk." The only lead the local police obtained was from 18-year-old Shane McLaren who reported that she was seen getting into a blue Commodore with two men. However, several months later, the police discovered that the report was false and McLaren was booked for perjury. Since the death of one other suspect, McLaren, a self-confessed ice addict, remains the only suspect in Morrison's murder.

== Aftermath ==
The police announced a A$50,000 reward in exchange for any information related to the murder.

In December 2017, Morrison's brother Andrew, in an interview with Geelong Advertiser, said, "I’ve only just been made aware that on the night they (Clare and friends) were all hanging around town, about eight of them, before they’ve nicked off in one car and all went to Point Addis. That’s where they were all meeting, at the cliff that overlooks Bell Beach. Clare didn’t leave with them, though. It was dark and, at this time of year with daylight savings, they must’ve been there past 9 pm or 10 pm." He added, "My sister was found early in the morning and she must have been in the water a long time for her to be attacked by sharks if that’s true, so I’m thinking they’ve just missed seeing her, it’s a very small window. One of these people, they could be the one who breaks the case right open."

== See also ==
- Lists of solved missing person cases
- List of unsolved murders (1980–1999)
