= Raymond Nels Nelson =

American journalist (1921–1981)

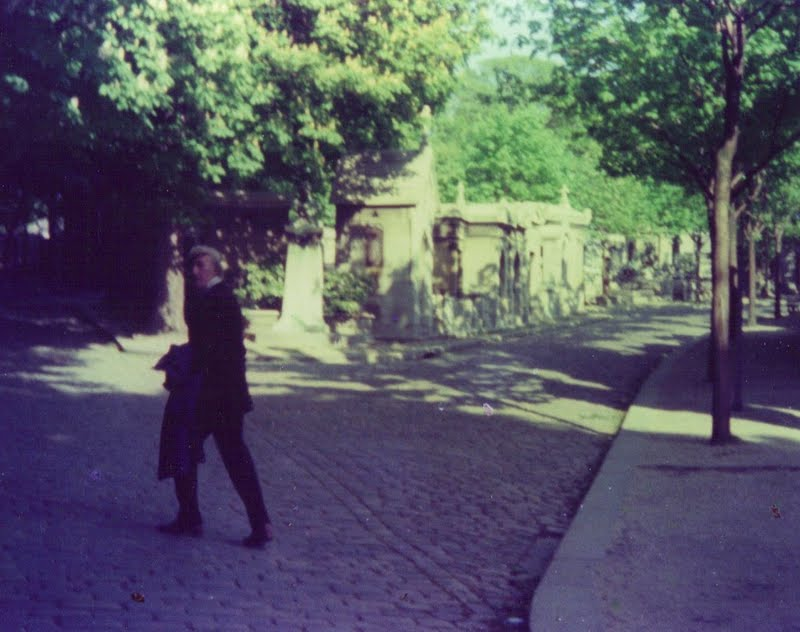
Raymond Nels Nelson

Raymond Nels Nelson (September 2, 1921 – June 1, 1981) was bureau chief of The Providence Journal and Evening Bulletin and later a member of the staff of Senator Claiborne Pell. He was found murdered in his Washington, D.C. apartment on June 1, 1981. The murder is still unsolved.

== Life ==
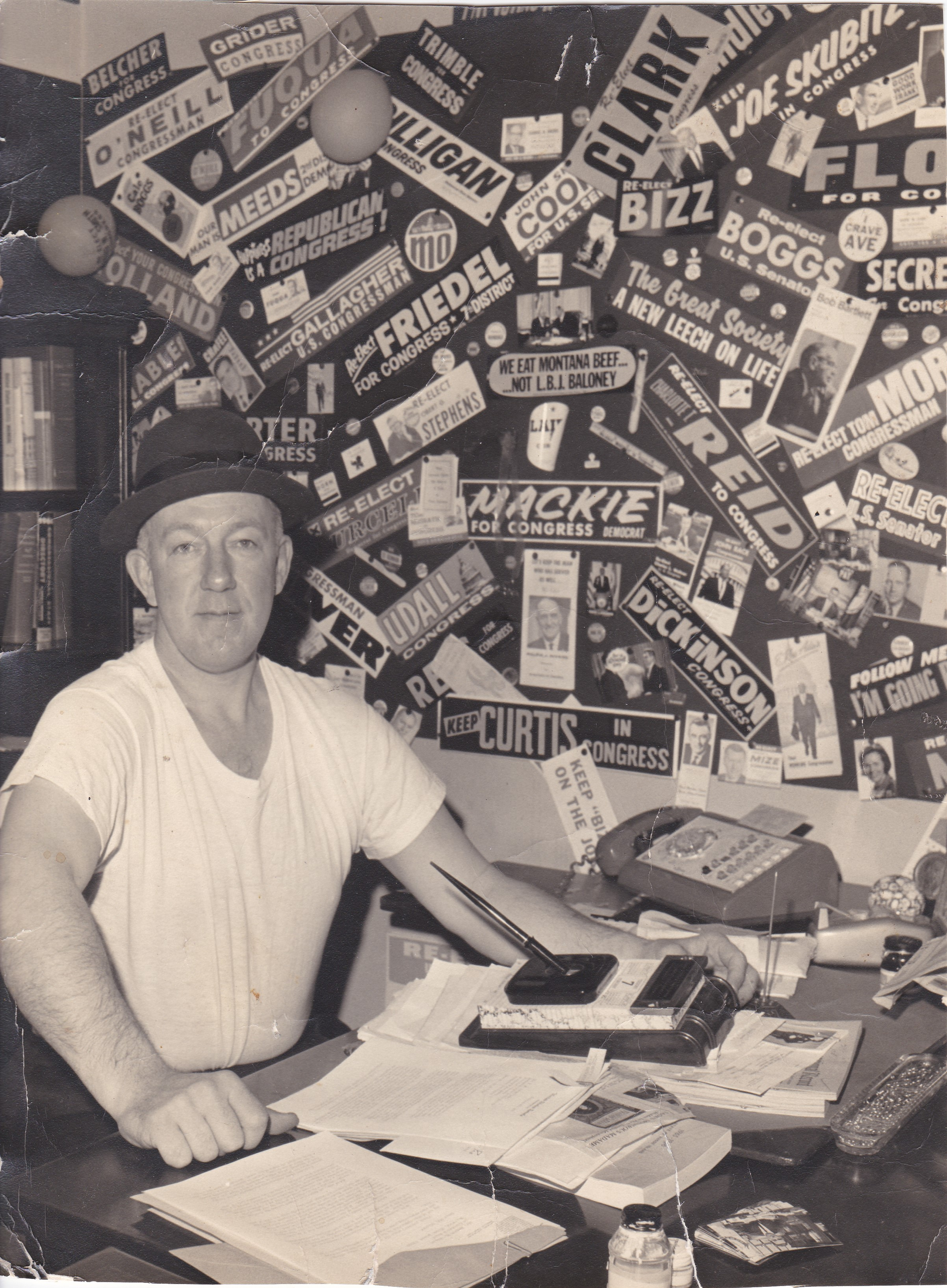
Nelson at his office in 1960

Born into a large working class Swedish family, Nelson didn't speak English until the age of 6. His twin brother, Ralph Hilmer, died of spinal meningitis in 1930. Nelson began his career at The Providence Journal as a typist after his honorable discharge from the Navy. After rising to bureau chief he was tapped to join the staff of future Senator Claiborne Pell.

Nelson managed Pell's first Senate campaign in 1960. Pell, considered a long-shot, became the first unendorsed aspirant to win a statewide primary in Rhode Island. When Pell was elected, Nelson went to Washington DC as his Administrative Assistant (AA). Commenting on the folly of staking his career on an unknown candidate, Nelson said: "There is absolutely nothing like being right when everybody thinks you're wrong," and called the campaign "the most fun I ever had." (Providence Journal-Bulletin, June 2, 1981). In a 1971 interview in the Sunday Journal, Nelson prided himself on Pell's Senate office's open door policy and college intern program, at the time the largest and most active on the Hill. The article declared Nelson as "…a nice guy and a tough guy, and he knows when to be which." (Providence Journal-Bulletin, June 2, 1981).

Nelson's influence on the early drafting of Federally funded college aid, later known as 'The Pell Grants', is detailed in G. Wayne Miller's biography on Pell, An Uncommon Man: "I don't believe he ever considered going to college," his son, David C. Nelson, recalled. "He had both admiration and disdain for higher education, believing he was as smart as any college graduate. This may have been a class thing, because he identified himself as a 'peasant', and my grandfather referred to the 'upper crust' as 'a bunch of crumbs held together by a little dough'. They almost lost their home several times during the Depression and were very traumatized during that period."

"Recognizing the complexities of the new world that his children would inherit convinced Nelson of the value of a college degree, and he brought that perspective to his boss in their discussions. Like Pell, Nelson saw a model in the G.I. Bill." (Page 156, An Uncommon Man)

In 1974 Nelson abruptly left Pell's office and joined the staff of the Senate Committee on Rules and Administration. Pell appointed another member of his staff, Paul Goulding, as his new AA. (Providence Journal-Bulletin, April 10, 1974). Nelson was seemingly a happily married family man with three children and a home in Bethesda, Maryland. In 1976, he openly declared himself a gay man and left his suburban home to live in the city. He remained good friends with his wife, whom he never divorced, and maintained contact with his children.

== Death ==
Nelson was found murdered amid scattered newspapers and magazines in his apartment near Catholic University in Washington D.C. at 701 Quincy Street, NE, on June 1, 1981. The reported murder weapon was a large office typewriter.

On the floor of the Senate, the day after the murder, Senator Pell said: "There is probably no other Senate employee known to more of us than Ray (Nelson). The respect and affection with which he was regarded by his colleagues was shown when he was selected to serve as president of the Senate Staff Club, and last year was presented the Distinguished Service Award by the Congressional St aff Club 'for his long time service in every facet of Senate life.' He also served as Senate Chairman for the Combined Federal Campaign." In a Washington Post article the day after the murder, Pell also said "Ray Nelson was a dear and old friend of my wife and me, as well as an associate who worked with me for many years. I grieve with and for his wife and children."

Before police sealed Nelson's apartment and office, a Senate staff member was allowed entry to remove 'sensitive' documents, thereby compromising evidence. Nelson's daughter Rebecca later stated that police did not interview family members who had been with him on the night before his death. Decades later, police revealed the crime scene had been staged and called the investigation "faulty police work". In November 1981, Wilmot Robertson wrote that Washington police had "clamped a lid of total secrecy" over the murder.

== See also ==
- List of unsolved murders (1980–1999)
