= Murder of Rick DeVecchi =

1998 murder in California, United States

- Location: Berkeley, California, U.S.
- Date: December 17, 1998; 27 years ago
- Attack type: Homicide by vehicle-ramming
- Victim: Richard DeVecchi
- Perpetrator: Unknown

Richard "Rick" DeVecchi (1961 – December 17, 1998) was an employee of a trucking business in Berkeley, California. His family hailed from San Lorenzo, a city located in the San Francisco Bay Area.

== Murder ==
Rick DeVecchi and his family had just gotten to the Berkeley Warehouse on the morning of Thursday, December 17, 1998. Just after 7:10 am that morning, a fellow employee at the business witnessed a stranger going through the back of Rick's pickup truck. Just before 7:15 am, Richard and the fellow employee went out to investigate the situation. By that time, however, the stranger had already gotten into his automobile, a 1970s or early 1980s tan or white colored Cadillac.

According to the Berkeley police and to four witnesses, that Thursday morning, the stranger was driving slowly at first. However, he began accelerating and driving faster, at which point he then hit Richard DeVecchi. The suspect continued driving after he hit Rick.

Rick's father Dick got on the telephone and dialed 9-1-1 just after witnessing the incident.

Richard was taken to a nearby hospital just after the crime. Three days after the incident, Richard succumbed to his injuries; the incident was then considered a murder by the Berkeley police.

The suspect in the homicide was later described by local police as an African American male.

According to the Berkeley police and several witnesses that had seen the hit and run that morning, the license plates on the Cadillac had the letters "CUS".

== Later years ==
The killing of Rick DeVecchi was later shown on the television show America's Most Wanted; it was profiled several times on the show in the years following the incident. The murder suspect has not been arrested as of 2020.

== See also ==
- List of unsolved murders (1980–1999)
