= Murder of Chaskel Werzberger =

1990 murder in Brooklyn, New York

- Chaskel Werzberger
- Location: Brooklyn, New York City, United States
- Date: February 8, 1990; 05:45 (UTC−5)
- Weapon: Handgun
- Victim: Chaskel Werzberger
- Perpetrator: Unknown
- Convicted: David Ranta

On February 8, 1990, Chaskel Werzberger, a 56-year-old rabbi, was shot and killed in Brooklyn, New York. David Ranta was wrongfully convicted of the murder, and served 23 years in prison before being released in 2013.

== Murder ==
On the morning of February 8, 1990, a gunman attempted to rob a diamond courier in the Williamsburg neighborhood of Brooklyn. The courier managed to escape unharmed. As the robber fled, he approached a nearby car on Clymer Avenue, which Werzberger was entering. The gunman shot him in the forehead, pulled him from the vehicle, and stole the car. Werzberger later died from the wound.

== Investigation and conviction ==
Mayor David Dinkins offered a $10,000 reward for information leading to an arrest, which caused pressure on the New York Police Department to solve the case quickly. In May 1991, David Ranta was convicted of second-degree murder and was sentenced to 37 and a half years in prison.

In 2011, the Brooklyn District Attorney's office launched a review of the case through its newly formed Conviction Integrity Unit. The review found significant flaws, including the recantation of a witness's identification and evidence suggesting that a witness had testified against Ranta to save himself.

On March 21, 2013, a New York state judge vacated Ranta's murder conviction and dismissed the indictment. He was released after serving 23 years in prison. In 2014, Ranta reached a $6.4 million settlement with the City of New York for his wrongful conviction.
