= Beaumaris, Tasmania =

Beaumaris
- Town
- Coordinates: 41°24′55″S 148°16′40″E
- Country: Australia
- State: Tasmania
- Region: North-east
- LGA: Break O'Day Council
- Location: 135 km (84 mi) east of Launceston; 230 km (140 mi) north of Hobart; 13 km (8.1 mi) S of St Helens

Government
  - State electorate: Lyons
  - Federal division: Lyons

Population
  - Total: 289 (2016 census)
- Postcode: 7215
Localities around Beaumaris
Upper Scamander	St Helens	Tasman Sea
Upper Scamander	Beaumaris	Tasman Sea
Upper Scamander	Scamander	Tasman Sea

Beaumaris (/bjuːˈmærɪs/ bew-MAR-is) is a rural locality in the local government area (LGA) of Break O'Day in the North-east LGA region of Tasmania. The locality is about 13 kilometres (8.1 mi) south of the town of St Helens. The 2016 census recorded a population of 289 for the state suburb of Beaumaris.

It is a small community on the north-east coast of Tasmania, facing the Tasman Sea. It is principally composed of beach-front properties, many of which are holiday or rental accommodation.

== History ==
Beaumaris was gazetted as a locality in 1967. The area was named after the small Welsh town of Beaumaris.

== Geography ==
The waters of the Tasman Sea form the eastern boundary, while the ridgeline of the Skyline Tier forms most of the western.

== Road infrastructure ==
Route A3 (Tasman Highway) runs through from south-east to north-east. Route A3 is the only road that provides access to Beaumaris.
