= List of unsolved murders in Australia =

This is a partial list of unsolved murders in Australia.

As of 2024, there are 200 homicide "cold cases" in Victoria according to Victoria Police.

There are 111 cases in South Australia that remain unsolved dating back to the 1950s.

== List ==
Year	Name of victim/s	Location body/ies found	Notes
1898	Michael Murphy, Norah Murphy and Theresa Murphy	Gatton, Queensland	Gatton murders
1902	Bertha Schippan	Towitta, South Australia	Aged 13, murdered at home while her parents were away overnight
1917	Jim Barclay	Wonnangatta Valley, East Gippsland, Victoria	First victim of the Wonnangatta murders
1918	John Bamford	Mount Howitt, Victoria	Second victim of the Wonnangatta murders
1921	Chrissie Venn	North Motton, Tasmania	Venn was a 13-year-old girl whose body was found in a hollow tree stump.
1931	Arthur Brennan	North Fitzroy, Victoria	On 12 September 1931, Brennan was shot dead outside his home, at 26 Rowe Street, North Fitzroy, by a burglar, who was trying to get into a neighbour's residence. Brennan confronted a man he saw standing on the neighbour's verandah. When he tried to make his escape, Brennan blocked his path at the garden gate and the pair then grappled. During the struggle, Brennan was shot in the chest by a small automatic pistol that the intruder had managed to draw from his overcoat with a free arm. Brennan died at the scene. The gunman was chased by two other bystanders but was able to get away. An investigation revealed that the gunman, likely aged 25 to 30, had earlier been seen scoping the area, and the police were able to get a good description of his appearance. The police were unable to locate the suspect and after three months had elapsed the City Coroner gave a finding that Brennan had been murdered by a "person unknown".
1935	James Smith	Port Jackson/Sydney harbour, New South Wales	Part of the Shark Arm case
1935	Reginald Holmes	Dawes Point, Sydney, New South Wales	Connected to the Shark Arm case
1952	Betty Shanks	Grange, Brisbane, Queensland	
1965	Marianne Schmidt and Christine Sharrock	Wanda Beach, Cronulla, Sydney, New South Wales	
1966	Allen Geoffrey Redston	Canberra, Australian Capital Territory	Redston was kidnapped and murdered on 28 September 1966, having disappeared the previous day. Redston's assailant was never caught, and it remains an infamous cold case in Canberra to this day. Redston headed to a friend's house, planning to spend the day at the Curtin Tip. After waiting for a short period of time, Redston left the area and was not seen again until his body was discovered the next day. The next day, after a search with police dogs, Redston's body was discovered among the reeds in a creek bed in Curtin. He had been bound, strangled, wrapped in carpet, and then moved to the location. On 27 September 1966, Redston was sent by his mother to buy ice cream for himself and his brother from the local shops. Redston however sent his brother away and headed to his friend's house, planning to spend the day at the Curtin Tip. After waiting for a short period of time, Redston left the area and was not seen again until his body was discovered the next day among the reeds in a creek bed in Curtin. He had been bound, strangled, wrapped in carpet, and then moved to the location. A manhunt began and quickly turned up the descriptions of two suspects: "a blond-haired youth, aged 13-15", and a young man. Both men were seen with Redston earlier that day, and both were seen leaving the tip where Redston is believed to have been murdered. No-one was ever officially charged of the crime.
1967	Mima Joan McKim-Hill	Biloela, Queensland	McKim-Hill was a 21-year-old Australian woman who was abducted, sexually assaulted and strangled on 9 March 1967. McKim-Hill left Rockhampton at 8:00am on 9 March 1967, and travelled south to Calliope. Her car was found abandoned at 3:00am the following morning on the Gladstone by-pass road, three kilometres north of Benaraby. Her body was found on 26 March 1967 at Collard Creek alongside the Dawson Highway, north-east of Biloela, eighty kilometres from where her car had been found. During the investigation, police followed two lines of enquiry. They searched for four men seen travelling in the local area in a Ford Customline, but they were never located. In 2011, the police said those men were still of interest. A truck driver carting tallow was also of interest to police during the investigation. An inquest into McKim-Hill's murder commenced on 6 November 1967 and concluded on 16 January 1968, during which time 26 witnesses gave evidence and a solicitor for the victim's family named a German truck driver as a likely suspect.
1972	George Ian Ogilvie Duncan	Adelaide, South Australia	Duncan was an Australian law lecturer at the University of Adelaide who drowned after being thrown into the River Torrens by a group of men believed to be police officers. Around 11.00 p.m. on 10 May 1972, Duncan and Roger James were both thrown into the river and Duncan drowned. Public debate was so great that Premier Dunstan permitted police commissioner, Harold Salisbury, to call in detectives from New Scotland Yard, London, to investigate the murder. Their report, which has never been made public, led to the crown solicitor announcing on 24 October 1972 that he had decided against proceeding with any prosecution. On 30 July 1985, former Vice Squad officer Mick O'Shea told The Advertiser newspaper that the group involved were Vice Squad officers and that there was a cover-up to protect them. On 5 February 1986 three former Vice Squad officers, Brian Hudson, Francis Cawley and Michael Clayton, were charged with the manslaughter of Duncan. Cawley and Clayton eventually went to trial in 1988 with both being acquitted of the charges on 30 September after refusing to testify. A further allegation was later raised that there had been an attempt to influence a juror to find the two officers charged not guilty. A police task force was set up, reporting to Parliament in 1990 that there was insufficient evidence to charge any person with the murder. Repeated calls for a Royal Commission have been ignored.
1975	Shirley Finn	South Perth, Western Australia	Finn's body was found on Monday 23 June 1975 in her parked Dodge DG Phoenix car near the 9th fairway of the Royal Perth Golf Club, South Perth. Finn's body was slumped behind the wheel with four bullet holes in her head. She wore valuable diamond jewellery which had not been touched. At the time, various rumours regarding the murder attributed it to specific issues relating to prostitution and the way it was being handled by police and government in Perth, but no evidence of this was made public. The murder, and the implied connections with issues relating to policing of the sex industry, resulted in a Royal Commission being held. On the thirtieth anniversary of the murder a cold-case review of the case was announced. An opinion was canvassed that no solution of the case was likely. In 2014, another cold-case review was launched by WA Police. The following year, the Corruption and Crime Commission confirmed it had received new information about the murder. On 6 March 2017, the ABC Television documentary series Australian Story aired a story titled "Getting Away With Murder" which revealed that a coronial inquest would be conducted in 2017. The inquest commenced on Tuesday 29 August The public hearing was adjourned on 20 December 2017 and resumed on 23 July 2018. After a week, it was again adjourned for 6 months, "allowing new leads to be followed up and two scientific investigations to be completed". Coroner Barry King acknowledged limitations but had not given up hope. He urged persons with information to come forward.
1976	Eloise Worledge	Beaumaris, Melbourne, Victoria	
1977	Suzanne Armstrong Susan Bartlett	Collingwood, Victoria (Australia)	Suzanne Armstrong and Susan Bartlett were stabbed to death on 10 January 1977 in their home at 147 Easey Street. On 15 January 2017 Victoria Police offered a reward of up to $1 million for information leading to the apprehension and subsequent conviction of the person or persons responsible. As of July 2016 the crime was unsolved, but in September 2024 a man was arrested in Italy in relation to the murders.
1977	Donald Bruce Mackay	Not found (Griffith, New South Wales)	Mackay had informed Sydney drug squad detectives of a large crop of marijuana in nearby Coleambally resulting in several arrests and the conviction of four men of Italian descent. At the trial of the arrested men, Mackay was identified as the whistleblower. On 15 July 1977, Mackay disappeared from the Griffith Hotel car park after having drinks with friends and has never been found. Stains from his blood group were evident on his van and the ground nearby, and his car keys were underneath the van. Nearby were drag marks, hair, and three spent .22 calibre cases. In 1984, the coroner ruled Mackay had died of "wilfully inflicted gunshot wounds". In 1986 hitman James Frederick Bazley was charged over the death. Bazley claimed he was innocent, blaming allegedly corrupt former Sydney detective Fred Krahe as the killer, but was convicted of conspiracy to murder Mackay. He was sentenced to life imprisonment. In July 2012, 35 years after his disappearance, the New South Wales police offered a $200,000 reward for information on the whereabouts of Mackay.
1977	Florence Maud Broadhurst	Paddington, New South Wales	Broadhurst was bludgeoned to death with a large piece of timber in her Paddington studio on 15 October 1977. There has been some speculation that Broadhurst was a victim of English Australian serial killer John Wayne Glover, who was convicted of murdering six elderly women on the Sydney North Shore district between 1989 and 1990, and is thought by police to have been responsible for other deaths. In the documentary Unfolding Florence: The Many Lives of Florence Broadhurst, friends and employees of Broadhurst stated that they believed the killer may have been known to her, due to the presence of two cups of tea near her body, suggesting a meeting or appointment, and the killer's apparent knowledge of her factory's layout.
1977	Annette Louise Morgan	Sydney University, New South Wales	Morgan was found raped, beaten and strangled in a gully at the edge of St Paul's College Oval on 31 October 1977. An autopsy reported the cause of death as a fractured skull and strangulation.
1978	Denise McGregor	Wallan, Victoria	McGregor was a schoolgirl from Pascoe Vale. She was kidnapped, raped and murdered on 20 March 1978. McGregor's assailant was never identified, and the case remains one of Melbourne's most infamous cold cases. The brutality of the murder was such that a pathologist described her injuries as being like those suffered by plane crash victims. In 1978 a reward of $50,000 was offered to help solve the murder.
1978	Mary Anne Fagan	Armadale, Melbourne, Victoria	41-year old Mary Anne Fagan lived with her husband and children at a house in Armadale. Her last known contact was a phone call around 11am with her husband. At 4pm her children came home from school and found the side gate was open. They were unable to find their mother and the doors to the house was locked. They broke a window to get in and found Fagan's body in the front bedroom, having been bound and gagged and then fatally stabbed multiple times. Several items were missing.
1979	Alan Arthur Barnes	Williamstown, South Australia	On Monday 18 June 1979, aged 17 was reported missing by his mother when he failed to return home after visiting a friend.
1979	Anne Roberts	Black Forest, South Australia	Anne Roberts was 20 years old when she was murdered in her Black Forest home, 16 September 1979. After returning home from a night out to Adelaide, she was raped and then killed using a brick. Her killer later returned the brick to its position in her flat's car park. Police believe the attack was spontaneous. A reward of up to $200,000 available to anyone who provides information or assistance that solves this case.
1980	Thomas Cooper	Beaumaris, Melbourne, Victoria	
1980	Allison Rooke	Frankston, Melbourne, Victoria	Part of the Tynong North and Frankston murders
1980	Maria James	Thornbury, Melbourne, Victoria	Maria James was murdered inside her High Street bookshop in Thornbury on Tuesday 17 June 1980. Her bookshop was connected to her apartment. At 11:55am she called her ex-husband John, leaving a message asking him to call her back. She did not give a reason for the call, but mentioned someone was in her shop. John returned the call a short time later, and Maria said "hold on" and then had a conversation with someone else. The conversation was unclear to John, but he considered something was wrong. She failed to return a later call, causing John to leave work and check on her welfare at the bookshop. Upon his arrival to the bookshop, he found the front and back doors locked, despite the "open" sign still being displayed. He forced his way into the building and discovered her body in her bedroom, with her hands bound and sustaining a significant amount of stab wounds, as well as significant injuries to her head. Soon after, John discovered the front door had been unlocked, suggesting someone was inside the building during John's arrival. 2 witnesses describe seeing a man running away from the crime scene who has never been identified.
1980	Bertha Miller, Catherine Headland and Ann-Marie Sargent	Tynong North, Victoria	Part of the Tynong North and Frankston murders
1981	Nabbutta Abbott Nabarula and David Charlie	Alice Springs, Northern Territory	2 people were killed and 14 others were injured after wine was poisoned with Strychnine. The identity of the person who carried out the poisoning is unknown.
1981	Joy Summers	Frankston, Melbourne, Victoria	Part of the Tynong North and Frankston murders
1982	Tony Jones	Not found (Townsville)	At the time of his disappearance, Tony Jones, a native of Perth, Western Australia, was in the last stages of a six-month working holiday around Australia. Jones set off alone on 28 October 1982 for a side trip to Cairns. When he arrived back in Townsville on 3 November 1982, he telephoned his family and girlfriend in Perth. He learned that his mother had just topped up his bank account with $150. Jones made no more phone calls and did not use his bank account again, and never made it to Mount Isa. In May 1983, the government issued a reward of $20,000 for information which leads to the apprehension and conviction of the person or persons responsible for the disappearance and suspected murder of Jones. In 2010 the reward was increased to $250,000. Despite no body having been found, Coroner Ian Fisher stated in his findings on 20 February 2002 that Jones was a victim of homicide. "I am satisfied that the missing person is dead," wrote the coroner. "I find that he died on or around the 3rd of November 1982 at the hands of a person or persons unknown".
1982	Jenny Rose Ng	Richmond, Melbourne, Victoria	
1984	Nanette Ellis	Boronia, Melbourne, Victoria	
1984	Giovanni Arena	Coburg, Melbourne, Victoria	
1984	Mandy Lee Yodgee	Mountain Highway, Sassafras, Greater Melbourne, Victoria	17-year old Yodgee was last seen at 11pm in a man's car going to a pizza restaurant on Bendigo Street, Prahran. She went with the man to his apartment in Prahran, Melbourne, Victoria where they drunk alcohol and ate pizza. The man claims that she left around 1:30am to get into a taxi. She was reported missing on 2 May 1984 after not being seen at her home or work for 3 days, as well as missing her 18th birthday. Her body was found on Tuesday 8 May off the side of the Mountain Highway in the town of Sassafras, in eastern Greater Melbourne. She was face down and fully clothed, but her boots were missing. Victoria Police believe she was murdered.
1984	Margaret Tapp and Seana Tapp	Ferntree Gully, Melbourne, Victoria	35-year old Nurse Margaret Tapp and her 9-year-old daughter Seana Tapp were found dead in their home, having been beaten and strangled to death. Seana had been raped before her death.
1985	Christopher Dale Flannery	Not found (Sydney)	Flannery, nicknamed "Mr. Rent-a-Kill", is alleged to have been an Australian contract killer. By the time of his disappearance and presumed death, police stated that they believed Flannery to have been responsible for up to a dozen murders. New South Wales State Coroner Greg Glass found that Flannery was murdered most probably on or about 9 May 1985. He also found that the key to solving the murder lay with Roger Rogerson.
1987	Kathleen Severino	Ballarat, Victoria	
1989	Ross Warren	Tamarama, Sydney, New South Wales	Part of the Gay gang murders
1989	Christopher Phillips	Cheltenham, Melbourne, Victoria	
1990	Douglas Phillpott	Kilsyth, Melbourne, Victoria	
1990	Sarah MacDiarmid	Not found (Seaford, Victoria)	MacDiarmid caught a train to Caulfield, then changed to a Frankston service. MacDiarmid's friends disembarked this train at Bonbeach while she remained, continuing on to Kananook station where her vehicle was parked. She was last seen alighting the train and heading for the poorly lit car park at approximately 10:20 p.m. Police suspected foul play based on bloodstains found beside her red 1978 Honda Civic abandoned in the station car park and drag marks leading into the bushes, but no trace of her was ever found. Later, witnesses said Sarah got off the train and crossed the footbridge to the car park, where some people heard a woman shouting, 'Give me back my keys.' A 21-day extensive air, sea, and land search with more than 250 police produced no results. In May 2006, an inquest held by coroner Ian West, found MacDiarmid 'had met her death as a result of foul play but the exact circumstances were unknown'. An initial State Government reward of $50,000 was increased after an additional $75,000 was offered by an anonymous benefactor. This was increased to $1 million, in 2004, and remains current.
1990	Joseph Shackleton and May Rosser	Brunswick, Melbourne, Victoria	
1990	Colleen Walker	Not found (Bowraville, New South Wales)	Walker was in Bowraville visiting relatives and was last seen alive at a party in the Aboriginal community of The Mission, on 13 September 1990. The following day her family reported to the police that she was missing. Despite the family believing something terrible had happened, the missing person's report was not taken seriously by police. No search parties were formed and no formal police action was taken. Walker's body has not been found, although articles of her clothing were later found weighed down by rocks in the Nambucca River.
1990	Michael Schievella and Heather McDonald	St Andrews, Victoria	
1990	Evelyn Greenup	Congarinni, New South Wales	On 4 October 1990, four-year-old Evelyn Greenup disappeared after a party at her grandmother's house. She was last seen by her mother when Greenup was put to bed. The next morning she was gone from her bed. On 27 April 1991, Greenup's skeletal remains were found in bushland near Congarinni Road. An autopsy could not conclusively determine the cause of death, but noted that a skull injury was "consistent with a forceful penetration by a sharp instrument".
1990	Janie Perrin	Bourke, New South Wales	Perrin, a 73-year-old grandmother was sexually assaulted and murdered in her home. Perrin was last seen walking into her flat in Tarcoon Street, and was attacked by an unknown number of males who sexually assaulted her. Police believe Perrin was bludgeoned by her attackers and that a number of personal items belonging to Perrin were stolen. Police interviewed hundreds of people during the investigation, which remains active. In November 2006 NSW Police doubled the reward to $100,000.
1990	Fiona Burns and John Lee	Western Highway, Victoria	
1990	Joseph Shackleton and May Rosser	Brunswick, Victoria	On or about 25 May 1990, 74-year-old May Rosser and her partner, 72-year-old Joseph Shackleton were beaten and stabbed to death in May's home on Hope St. Brunswick.
1991	Clinton Speedy-Duroux	Congarinni, New South Wales	On 31 January 1991, 16-year-old Speedy-Duroux went missing after a party at The Mission. On 18 February his remains were discovered in bushland near Congarinni Road.
1991	Anna Rosa Liva	(not found) Coober Pedy, South Australia	30yr old Italian tourist travelling around Australia, she was last seen in the outback opal mining town of Coober Pedy on 28 November 1991. Police searched the area extensively, with the help of both Aboriginal trackers and police dogs, without success and her younger brother Constantino travelled out from Italy to help in the search. Police suspect she was murdered after accepting a ride in a car.
1991	Melinda Freeman	Whittlesea, Victoria	
1991	Karmein Chan	Thomastown, Victoria	Chan was a 13-year-old girl who was abducted from her home in Templestowe, Victoria, during the night of 13 April 1991. Chan and her sisters were confronted by a man in a balaclava with a knife. He forced Chan's sisters into a wardrobe before fleeing with Chan. A reward of $100,000 was offered for information on her abduction. On 9 April 1992, Chan's remains were found in a landfill area at Edgars Creek in the suburb of Thomastown. The skull had three bullet holes in the back of the head. The body had probably been there for 12 months. The case has remained open with cold case detectives regularly reviewing the investigation. On the 25th anniversary of her abduction the reward was increased from $100,000 to $1,000,000.
1991	Leanne Holland	Redbank Plains, Queensland	Holland was a 12-year-old girl whose mutilated body was found in the Redbank Plains, three days after she had been reported missing. Her sister's live-in boyfriend at the time, Graham Stafford, was initially convicted of her murder, but his conviction was later quashed and he was released after 14 years imprisonment. Her true killer has not been apprehended.
1992	Michele Brown	Frankston, Victoria	Brown was a 25-year-old woman who was found deceased behind a gun shop in Frankston on 14 March 1992. There is a $1 million reward on offer for information that leads to an arrest.
1992	Clare Morrison	Bells Beach, Victoria	Morrison was a 13-year-old girl who was murdered on 19 December 1992 in Geelong. Her near-naked body was discovered by surfers early morning on 19 December near Bells Beach. Morrison was last seen on the night of 18 December in Geelong Mall. Police announced a $50,000 reward in exchange for any information related to the murder.
1993	Crispin Dye	Sydney	The manager of AC/DC, Dye was attacked on 23 December 1993, dying two days later. His death remained under investigation in 2023.
1993	Emanuel Sapountzakis	Endeavour Hills, Melbourne, Victoria	
1994	Revelle Sabine Balmain	Not found (Kingsford, New South Wales)	Balmain was working as an escort who disappeared from the Sydney suburb of Kingsford in November 1994. On the afternoon of 5 November, Balmain, visited a client in the south-eastern Sydney suburb of Kingsford. After the two-hour appointment was over she had planned to meet friend Kate Brentnell for a drink. At 7.15 pm Revelle rang Kate Brentnell to say that she was about to leave her client and suggested that they meet at the Royal Hotel, Paddington. She did not keep that appointment. The next day, Balmain's bag, shoes, make-up, diary, credit cards and keys to her Bellevue Hill flat were found scattered around several Kingsford streets. Police interviewed Balmain's client, who said that he had driven her to the nearby Red Tomato Inn at about 7.00 pm on the evening of 5 November. Police officers also questioned the escort agency's owners, but the enquiries resulted in no charges being laid. The New South Wales government offered a reward of $100,000 for anyone who could provide information that would lead to the arrest of Balmain's killer. The reward for information is now up to $250,000.
1994	Samantha Mizzi	St Kilda, Melbourne, Victoria	
1994	Leah Buck	Williamstown, Melbourne, Victoria	
1995	Victoria Cafasso	Beaumaris, Tasmania	Cafasso was a tourist from Italy visiting a cousin. She went for a walk on the beach and was later found bashed and stabbed to death.
1996	Andrew Mordowicz	Klemzig, Adelaide, South Australia	Aged 43, worked as a Taxi driver for United Yellow Taxis. Was shot outside out house after being dispatched to collect a fare and died a short time later in the Royal Adelaide Hospital.
1996	Sarah Spiers	Claremont, Western Australia	Part of the Claremont serial killings
1997	Jaidyn Raymond Leskie	Moe, Victoria	Leskie is believed to have died of head injuries. After a missing person's search Jaidyn's body was found on 1 January 1998 at Blue Rock Dam, 18 km north of Moe. His body had been preserved by the cold waters of the lake through winter and the clothing he was wearing was subject to a DNA test in an effort to solve the crime. Greg Domaszewicz was charged with murder, but was found not guilty in December 1998. A controversial 2006 inquest, found that he had contributed to the toddler's death and had likely disposed of the boy's body.
1997	Jane Thurgood-Dove	Niddrie, Melbourne, Victoria	34-year old Jane Thurgood-Dove was a mother of three who was shot in front of her children in the driveway of her home on Muriel Street at 3:40pm, 6 November 1997. A stolen blue Holden Commodore pulled next to her house when a gunman exited and shot Jane Thurgood-Dove to death. The car was later found torched in a nearby street. Victoria Police believe she was a victim of mistaken identity and not the intended target of the shooting.
1998	Lois Roberts	Nimbin, New South Wales	
1998	Annabel Strzelecki	Clare, South Australia	28 year old Filipina, last seen by friends at her home on 6 June 1998. She moved to SA after her marriage to Wlodzimierz Strzelecki (age 63) when she was 19 yrs old. He was a person of interest in her disappearance and suspected murder. He took his own life 2 yrs after her disappearance, aged 73.
1998	Alphonse Gangitano	Templestowe, Melbourne, Victoria	Gangitano was shot and killed in the laundry of his home. A coroner's report into his death directly implicated Jason Moran and Graham Kinniburgh. They were both found to be in Gangitano's home in Templestowe when the murder took place. It could not be established who pulled the trigger. Both were excused from giving evidence to the coroner on the grounds they might incriminate themselves. Gangitano is considered to be the second of the thirty-six Melbourne gangland killings between 1998 and 2010.
1999	Michelle Bright	Outside Gulgong, New South Wales	SOLVED: Bright was a 17-year-old who was found raped and murdered. She was last seen at 12:45 am on 27 February 1999 by a friend who dropped her off in Herbert Street, Gulgong following a friend's 15th birthday party on 27 February 1999. The Minister for Police, Michael Daley announced that the NSW Government offered a reward of $500,000 to solve the murder of Bright. The police regard Bright's death as a horrific crime. On 10 August 2020, the reward was raised to $1,000,000. The following day, 53-year-old Craig Henry Rumsby, a former neighbour of Bright's, was arrested for her murder, and also an assault with intent to rape against an 18-year-old committed in 1998. On 30 June 2023, Rumsby was found guilty of Bright's murder and the assault on the 18-year-old. On 7 August 2023, Justice Robert Allan Hulme sentenced Rumsby to 32 years imprisonment with a non-parole period of 24 years: Rumsby will be eligible for parole in 2044, at the age of 77.
2000	Terrence Black	Gladysdale, Victoria	59-year old Terrence Black was a pensioner living at Yarra Junction caravan park last seen around 9 and 10am in a supermarket car park in Yarra Junction on 5 May 2000. He was reported missing by his brother on 18 May and his body was eventually discovered on a rural property on Little Yarra Road in Gladysdale. His body was discovered on a rural property on Little Yarra Road in Gladysdale. Police believed he was possibly murdered in a public toilet in Yarra Junction.
2000	Adam Matthews	Goulburn River, near the Chinaman's Bridge Caravan Park, Victoria	
2000	Mark Moran	Aberfeldie, Melbourne, Victoria	Organised crime figure, part of the Melbourne gangland killings
2000	Christos Saristavros	Box Hill, Melbourne, Victoria	
2002	Kade Hall	Kalorama, Melbourne, Victoria	24-year old Hall was last seen alive in Croydon, around 10pm on Thursday, 28 February. He was believed to be meeting a drug dealer. He was reported missing to police by Saturday 2 March after he had made no contact. His body was found in bushland on Friday 15 March 10 metres from Mount Dandenong Road in Kalorama on. He had sustained a fatal gunshot to his head and neck. Police believed his death was possibly connected to his involvement in heroin trafficking in Melbourne's outer eastern suburbs. His sister suspects he was killed by people he knew, claiming that after she asked around, threats were made to her life.
2002	Margaret Gall	Raymond Terrace, Hunter Region, New South Wales	Strike Force Varberg was formed to investigate the murder. It included detectives from the homicide squad and the Port Stephens Local Area Command. In 2011, Anne Maree Wotherspoon, a 27-year-old woman from Hamilton South, was arrested in Newcastle CBD. She was subsequently charged with murder and then refused bail. Eventually three other people were arrested and charged for their alleged involvement. However, in April 2012, prosecutors dropped charges against all three of the accused. In late 2013, the Supreme Court of New South Wales ruled that the confession of Wotherspoon was unreliable. Wotherspoon had told police that she and three others had stormed Gall's home seeking drugs and money. However, she made a number of errors in her confession including what weapon was used and the time of the murder. Justice Megan Latham found that Wotherspoon had been diagnosed with schizophrenia and drug-induced psychosis, causing delusions and hallucinations. Wotherspoon, an intravenous drug user, was recorded telling one of her boyfriends that she was going to confess with the intention of being imprisoned and being placed on a methadone program. New South Wales Government is offering a reward of $100,000 for information leading to the arrest and conviction of those responsible.
2003	Nik Radev	Coburg, Melbourne, Victoria	Radev was shot and killed in Queen St Coburg on 15 April 2003 in a series of similar events that are commonly referred to as the Melbourne gangland killings. Victoria Police told The Age that they believed his death was planned by a father and son drug manufacturing team, and a hitman suspected of four other murders carried out the killing in a red Ford Falcon XR6 Turbo sedan. His associates Damien Cossu and Alfonso Traglia were with Radev at the time of the murder but claimed they could not identify the gunman, and were subsequently named by police as 'persons of interest'.
2003	Nick Falos	Thornbury, Melbourne, Victoria	
2003	Andrew (Wilbur) David Williamson	Coober Pedy, South Australia	On the morning of Tuesday 11 November 2003, Mr Williamson was the victim of a serious assault inside his house which resulted in his death. A quantity of gold jewellery and cash was stolen from him.
2005	Simone Strobel	Lismore, New South Wales	Believed to be murder, case unsolved. Her boyfriend was arrested as a suspect in 2022, but in June 2023, charges against him were dropped due to lack of evidence.
2005	Trevor Tascas	Whittington, Geelong, Victoria	
2006	Mario Condello	Brighton, Melbourne, Victoria	Condello was shot dead in his driveway on 6 February 2006, a day before he was due to stand trial for conspiracy to murder Carl Williams. Victoria Police believed hitman Rodney Collins killed Mario Condello as a paid hit.
2007	Corryn Rayney	Kings Park, Perth, Western Australia	
2007	Shannon McCormack	Outside the Queens Bridge Hotel, Melbourne CBD, Victoria	
2007	Frank Newbery	Cooks Hill, New South Wales	Newbery is believed to have been attacked in his shop, Frank's Ham & Beef, some time between 4:00pm and 4:30pm on 12 March 2007. He was bludgeoned with a "large blunt object" that was never found. His body was discovered concealed under cardboard boxes. Newbery's knuckles were bruised, suggesting that he attempted to resist his attacker. In 2012 a coronial inquest suggested that Newbery had been "attacked by a person or persons that were unknown." Police analysed hundreds of other similar robberies, investigated prisoners on parole, and took DNA swabs from every person who visited the shop on the day of the murder. Two samples found at the scene remain unidentified. In 2017, Detective Inspector Peter Mahon stated, "We are still not sure of the motive, because if it was a robbery, you would have thought that they would have searched Frank and taken his money out of his wallet."
2011	Peter Gibb	Seaford, Victoria	
2011	Brenda Goudge	Wantirna South, Victoria	On the 8th of July 2011, 61 year old Brenda Goudge was found murdered with her body hidden in her backyard pool alongside her bedding, with the pool cover closed over her. The coroners report stated she was attacked while in bed, had defensive injuries, was strangled, and suffered blunt force trauma to head, face, neck. The coroner was unable to determine if Brenda was alive at the time she was submerged in the swimming pool, and her location was likely intended to destroy any DNA evidence left by her attacker. When Brenda failed to arrive at work or answer any calls or texts from her daughter Jessica, who was also her coworker, she attended her mother's home. Alongside Jessica was one of Brendas business partners, a former police detective named Paul Calloway. He would later be found the chief suspect in her murder and be accused of deliberately disturbing the crime scene and tainting evidence during this visit. Some have reported Calloway heavily influenced Brenda into taking out a life insurance policy just prior to her death that would benefit their shared business. It was known that the two had a history of interpersonal conflict, and Calloway's statements to police were inconsistent, with his account of the night of the murder changing. During the 2016 colonial inquest into her death, it was found there was insufficient evidence to definitively identify Calloway as the perpetrator, while not enough evidence to definitively prove he was not responsible for her murder. It is reported that parts of Brendas family are sure of his guilt. Police have issued a $1 reward for information leading to the conviction of the person/s responsible.
2011	Lynette Bradbury		Lynette was a receptionist at Westmead Hospital in Sydney. On Hallowe'en in 2011 her husband allegedly left in the afternoon and came home to find her body. She died of a head injury and was found with her ankles bound. Her husband was charged with her murder but the prosecution did not go ahead due to insufficient evidence. In 2019 an inquest found there was insufficient evidence to suspect an intruder had killed her, as DNA and other forensic evidence at the scene collected was only of Lynette and her extended family.
2013	Tracey Connelly	St Kilda, Melbourne, Australia	Connelly was a 40-year old prostitute who was found dead in her van by her partner. Her van was parked on Greeves Street, St Kilda and the body was found at 3pm on Sunday, 21 July 2013. Police believe she was murdered in her van, having sustained injuries to her face and upper bodies. She had been living and working in her van for around a month. The last confirmed sighting of her alive was at 11:30pm on Saturday, 20 July. CCTV footage indicates she returned to her van sometime between 2 and 2:30am on 21 July. A DNA sample believed to belong to the murderer was found by police, and checked against Victoria Police's database with no luck. It was also checked against 1500 people including people in St Kilda at the time of the murder, locals with a violent past and registered sex offenders.
2014	Monika Chetty	Died Concord Repatriation General Hospital in Sydney	Monika was an ex-nurse who had become homeless due post separation from her husband in the context of large gambling debts. She was also involved in immigration fraud, selling false visas to students. She suffered extensive burns to >80% of her body surface area, suspected to be from >8L of concentrated hydrochloric acid poured on her by an assailant unknown. She declined to identify the person, having previously given what is thought to be false information about a supposed stranger. Rather than receiving medical attention for some time she was begging for money on the streets. She became progressively unwell and was admitted to hospital where she died. Despite an inquest and multiple associates who could have a plausible motive, no clear evidence of their involvement has ever been established.
2018	Mick Hawi	Sydney, New South Wales	
2018	Safa Annour	Died Canberra Hospital	Safa was a 2-year-old child, daughter of Sudanese refugees. She was brought to the hospital and found to have severe bleeding due to blunt force trauma and died. 2 people involved with her care were initially investigated by the police for the murder but to date the murder has not been solved.

== See also ==
- Category:Unsolved deaths in Australia
- Lists of unsolved murders
- List of unsolved murders in Western Australia
