= Sensing Murder =

- Genre: Documentary Reality Television
- Created by: David Baldock
- Directed by: John Keir
- Starring: Sue Nicholson; Deb Webber; Kelvin Cruickshank
- Narrated by: Rebecca Gibney (Seasons 1-4); Amanda Billing (Seasons 5-6)
- Country of origin: Denmark
- No. of seasons: 6
- No. of episodes: 47

Production
- Executive producers: Philly de Lacey; John McEwen (2006–2010)
- Producer: Carolyn Harper
- Camera setup: Multi-camera
- Running time: 65 minutes
- Production companies: Screentime New Zealand; Banijay Entertainment; Ninox Television Ltd (2006–2010)

Original release
- Network: TVNZ 2
- Release: January 10, 2006 – August 23, 2018

Sensing Murder is a television show in which three psychics are asked to act as psychic detectives to help provide evidence that might be useful in solving famous unsolved murder cases by communicating with the deceased victims.

The program format was developed in 2002 by Nordisk Film TV in Denmark, and was sold to many countries, including Australia, Belgium, Canada, Hungary, the Netherlands, New Zealand, Norway, Sweden, and the US. In 2004, Granada Entertainment bought the US rights. The New Zealand (TVNZ 2) series first aired in 2006 and was hosted by Rebecca Gibney. On 17 January 2017, it was announced that Amanda Billing would be the host for the Australia/New Zealand version.

== Format (Australia/New Zealand) ==
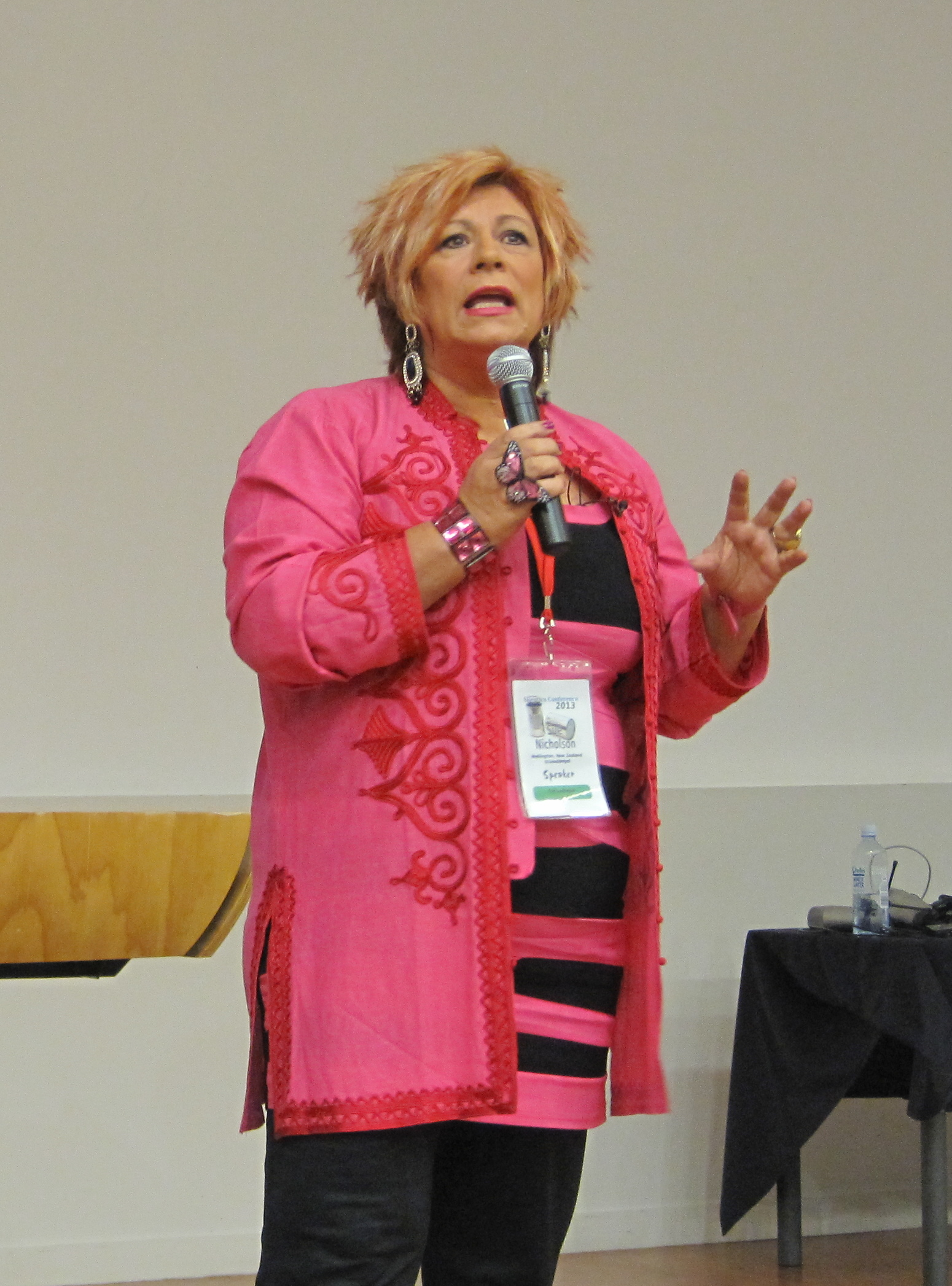
Medium Sue Nicholson in 2013

Each episode included detailed re-enactments of the events leading up to the murder and of the murder itself. The producers stated that the psychics were given no information about the case other than a photo, which some psychics preferred to keep face-down, the idea being that the less information they had, the better their psychic abilities would function. Other psychics chose to look at the photograph.

To demonstrate their abilities, the psychics revealed their impressions of the case or person which might match details in the case file. They were then asked to provide any extra information they could. A private detective hosted the next section, in which he was asked to investigate any new leads suggested by the psychics and sometimes talk to the families of the deceased.

The show's producers claimed that, before each series, they tested 70-75 psychics and mediums in New Zealand and Australia by using a case that had already been solved. The most accurate psychics were then short-listed, from which the producers chose two or three to attempt to contact the spirits of the murder victims, to get impressions helpful to describe the victim, their circumstances of the murder, and the details of their death. The three that were most often chosen were Deb Webber (Australian), and Sue Nicholson and Kelvin Cruickshank (New Zealanders).

Producer David Baldock rejected any idea of objectively testing the psychics' abilities, although he said that if a third series of Sensing Murder was made, he might devise other tests of their alleged powers.

The Australian episodes of Sensing Murder suffered numerous setbacks, including a budget overrun which threatened to bankrupt producer Rhonda Byrne.

== Episodes (Australia/New Zealand) ==
=== Season 1 (2006) ===
No.	Title	Original release date
1	"The Patient Killer"	10 January 2006
In 1976, thirteen-year-old schoolgirl Tracey Ann Patient was plucked off Auckland's Great North Road. The following morning, her body was found dumped 16 km away in the Waitākere Ranges, having been strangled with a pantyhose tourniquet. Deb Webber and Sue Nicholson investigate.
2	"Cruel Intent"	17 January 2006
The psychics investigate the unsolved kidnapping of Sharon Wills and Nicola Lynas, and the kidnapping/murder of Karmein Chan.
3	"Walk of Innocence"	24 January 2006
In 1970, eighteen-year-old Olive Walker disappeared as she walked across Rotorua to babysit her nieces and nephews. Her semi-naked body was found hours later in a rest area south of the city, having been bashed to death so fiercely that her skull had been smashed into seven pieces. Deb Webber and Adelle Dishcombe investigate.
4	"Lost Soul"	31 January 2006
In 1985, 25-year-old Luana 'La Verne' Williams disappeared from her Tauranga home. Eight years later her disappearance was upgraded to a murder enquiry. Her body has never been found. Sue Nicholson, Scott Russell Hill, and Kelvin Cruickshank investigate.
5	"A Bump in the Night"	4 April 2006
In Auckland, on 15 August 1980, 6-year-old Alicia O'Reilly was raped and murdered in her bed, while her 8-year-old sister slept less than a metre away and her mother was sleeping across the hallway. Kelvin Cruickshank and Deb Webber investigate.
6	"A Mother's Instinct"	11 April 2006
In 1974, Lorraine Wilson and Wendy Evans set out from Brisbane to hitchhike to Goondiwindi. Their remains were found 2 years later in bush at Murphy's Creek, near the foothills of the Toowoomba Ranges.
7	"Fallen Angel"	18 April 2006
In 1995, Angela Blackmore, a twenty-one-year-old mother with a two-year-old son, was murdered in the kitchen of her home, being stabbed thirty-nine times. The child was not harmed and the killer has never been identified.
8	"The Scarlet Letter"	25 April 2006
In 1986, Elizabeth Barnard was found dead at her parents' property at Phillip Island. The alleged killer Vivienne Cameron disappeared without a trace on the same night and her deserted car was found near the San Remo Bridge on the island. After an extensive three-day land and sea search, Vivienne's body was never found.
9	"Blood Money"	2 May 2006
In 1979, a 94-year-old man named George Engelbrecht, was brutally beaten to death in his home in Lower Hutt. Kelvin Cruickshank and Deb Webber investigate.
10	"The Last Train Home"	9 May 2006
In 1990, 23-year-old Sarah MacDiarmid caught a train from Richmond station to Kananook station. She got off the train about 10.20pm and has not been seen since. The psychics investigate to find out what happened.
11	"Almost Perfect"	30 May 2006
This episode deals with the case of Elmer Crawford. He appeared to be an average family man, but then in 1970, he murdered his pregnant wife and three children, with no apparent motive. Psychics Deb Webber and Barbara Neilson try to shed some light on the incident.
12	"The Last Goodbye"	6 June 2006
This episode deals with the case of Catherine Headland a victim in the Tynong North and Frankston Murders. The 14-year-old disappeared in the early 1980s along with five other women, whose bodies were eventually found in the Country Victoria. Police believe the offender is a lone serial killer but despite their best efforts, their killer has never been found and brought to justice. Psychics Deb Webber and Scott Russell Hill are asked to shed some light on this incident.

=== Season 2 (2007) ===
No.	Title	Original release date
1	"Insight"	4 September 2007
Shows the behind the scenes of the show.
2	"In Too Deep"	11 September 2007
Covers the 1999 death of two engineers on a ship in the Persian gulf.
3	"Girl In The Ditch"	18 September 2007
1992 death of 12-year-old Agnes Ali'iva'a.
4	"Taken For A Ride"	25 September 2007
1980 Auckland death of photographer Simon Buis.
5	"Lost For Words"	2 October 2007
Unsolved May 1993 disappearance of 17-year-old prostitute Jayne Furlong. On 20 June 2012, police confirmed that the remains of a body found at Port Waikato were Furlong's.
6	"Last Orders"	9 October 2007
Murder of Kevin O'Loughlin in Nelson.
7	"A Mother's Worst Nightmare"	16 October 2007
Disappearance of 2-year-old Amber-Lee Cruickshank.
8	"Long Way Home"	23 October 2007
Unsolved disappearance of 25-year-old Judy Yorke.
9	"Out of Aces"	30 October 2007
Death of conman Garth Doull in Wellington in September 1989.
10	"Into Thin Air"	6 November 2007
Disappearance of Jim Donnelly in June 2004.
11	"Psychics Revealed"	13 November 2007
Special about the lives of psychics Deb Webber, Kelvin Cruickshank, Sue Nicholson and Scott Russell Hill.

=== Season 3 (2008) ===
No.	Title	Original release date
1	"Where There's Smoke..."	8 July 2008
Covers the death of Blake Stott (19) who died in a car fire.
2	"Now You See Me..."	15 July 2008
When Alexa Cullen (26) disappeared from her Manaia home in 1995, police initially treated it as a missing persons case. However, three years later, her sister heard rumours that a family member had something to do with the deaf woman's disappearance. Was Cullen murdered or did she just vanish?
3	"Vanishing Point"	22 July 2008
In 2003, Sara Niethe vanished from the Hauraki Plains.
4	"Without Warning!"	29 July 2008
Unsolved June 2007 hit and run death of 18-year-old Regan O'Donoghue. Notably, a police detective sat in on the psychics readings.
5	"When The Trail Goes Cold"	1 August 2008
62-year-old Kaye Stewart disappeared in June 2005. Notably, the psychics' readings were conducted by the head of the Lower Hutt CIB.

=== Season 4 (2010) ===
No.	Title	Original release date
1	"Looking For Justice"	11 February 2010
Covers the 1977 murder of Lesley Calvert (33), wife of farmer Lindsay Calvert who was a suspect in her death. Notably, it was the first time a lead suspect in a case asked for the case to be looked at.
2	"Stone Cold"	18 February 2010
2004 hypothermia death of Brendan Percy in Oamaru.
3	"Seeking Siegfried"	25 February 2010
Siegfried Newman, a Katikati man who supposedly died in a fall while in bushland area in 2008. Notably, the episode aired exactly two years after he went missing.
4	"Lie Of The Land"	4 March 2010
About the 2002 drowning death of Waikato man Jason Dark.
5	"Where's Granddad?"	11 March 2010
Allan Woodford (65) left his home in Mossburn on foot on 20 April 1985.

=== Season 5 (2017) ===
No.	Title	Original release date
1	"Stolen Dreams - Part 1"	2 March 2017
Murder of New Zealander Joan-Marie Wech (19) in Sydney, Australia in 1971.
2	"Stolen Dreams - Part 2"	9 March 2017
Part 2.
3	"Taken Out - Part 1"	16 March 2017
Reidy's body was found on the outskirts of Ngāruawāhia in 1995, at first thought to be the victim of a hit and run.
4	"Taken Out - Part 2"	23 March 2017
Part 2.
5	"Little Boy Lost - Part 1"	30 March 2017
The case of a 9–year–old New Zealand boy, Peter Boland, who disappeared in 1957.
6	"Little Boy Lost - Part 2"	6 April 2017
Part 2.
7	"Out of the Dark - Part 1"	20 April 2017
2008 murder of a 46-year-old Napier grandmother.
8	"Out of the Dark - Part 2"	27 April 2017
Part 2.

=== Season 6 (2018) ===
No.	Title	Original release date
1	"Paula Brown (part 1)"	19 July 2018
About Paula Brown, a hairdresser who disappeared from Sydney's downtown after a night out with friends.
2	"Paula Brown (part 2)"	26 July 2018
Part 2.
3	"John Reynolds (part 1)"	2 August 2018
About murdered Christchurch scrap-metal dealer, John Reynolds.
4	"John Reynolds (part 2)"	9 August 2018
Part 2.
5	"Cynthia Greenwood-Smith (part 1)"	16 August 2018
About Cynthia Greenwood-Smith (53) and her disappearance from her Gold Coast home.
6	"Cynthia Greenwood-Smith (part 2)"	23 August 2018
Part 2.

== Awards and nominations ==
- 2006 Qantas Media Awards
  - WINNER:Best Director, Non-Drama
  - WINNER:Best Reality Format
- 2008 Qantas Television and Film Awards
  - WINNER:Best Format-Reality Series

== Books ==
- Sensing Murder (2008)
- Walking in Light, autobiography of Kelvin Cruickshank (March 2009)

== Case developments ==
The murder of George Engelbrecht was profiled in Season 1, the episode concluding with a shot of Engelbrecht's unmarked grave. The story generated a big public response, and the local community, monumental mason Glover Memorial, and JR Croft Funeral Directors decided to organise a tribute. On 5 July 2006, there was a public unveiling of a headstone for Engelbrecht.

During the first episode of Season 2, ("Sensing Murder: Insight"), concerning Luana Williams, it was reported that, after the episode screened, Sue Nicholson received a threatening phone call from an unknown man claiming to know where Luana's missing remains were located. In the show, the psychics identified McLaren Falls as Williams' burial site. Afterwards, police received a report of a skull at the falls. However, the skull was several kilometres from the site identified by the psychics, and was part of a historical burial of three people, not the remains of Williams. Williams' disappearance remains unsolved.

The case of Angela Blackmoore, a 23-year-old pregnant mother, was solved in 2019, with further arrests in 2023. David Hawken, Rebecca Wright-Meldrum and Jeremy Powell were all convicted. The relevant episode was "Fallen Angel".

The Australian series was filmed in 2003 and 2004, and none of the cases have since been solved. Later episodes in New Zealand generated unsubstantiated leads, although the episode that screened on TV2 on 16 October 2007 claimed to have identified the killer and the case was reopened by police.

== Criticisms ==
Sensing Murder was based on a Danish television programme Fornemmelse for mord which is on record as having failed to produce any positive results.

Australian police dismissed the show and said that they "only deal in factual evidence not psychic".

A source within New Zealand police has said: "spiritual communications were not considered a creditable foundation for investigation".

The findings of recent episodes are disputed by sceptics and police, who do not believe in psychic detection and are, in most cases, not willing to follow up investigations conducted by private investigators on behalf of the show's producers.

The show was exposed on a 2007 episode of Eating Media Lunch, in a section called "Sensing Bullshit", which showed footage from the Australian TV show Caught on Hidden Camera in which Deb Webber answered questions about a presenter's fictional sister. It was further satirised in the season finale, in which host Jeremy Wells humorously highlighted the fact that not a single case had been solved.

Television New Zealand was criticised after the network used its Breakfast show to cross-promote the show, with vague claims about the whereabouts of missing toddler Aisling Symes.

On 20 June 2012, New Zealand Police confirmed that a recent discovery of a body at a beach in Port Waikato (90 km (56 mi) from Auckland), was that of Jayne Furlong. Furlong's case had been featured during the second season of the Sensing Murder series in 2007. The New Zealand Skeptics claimed that it was evidence that the TV psychics were incorrect about the location of Furlong's body, since they had claimed that it was either in the Auckland Domain or on a demolition site in Auckland. Sceptics have highlighted that Sensing Murder reinforces the fact psychic powers are a myth, and that the failure of the program to solve any murders, find missing bodies, or come up with any factual evidence, is evidence of that.
