= Paul Denyer =

Australian serial killer (born 1972)

- Born: Paul Charles Denyer; 14 April 1972 (age 54); Campbelltown, Sydney, New South Wales, Australia
- Other names: The Frankston Serial Killer, Paula
- Status: In custody
- Criminal charge: Murder x3; abduction
- Penalty: Life imprisonment x3; with a 30-year non-parole period

Details
- Date: 11 June – 30 July 1993
- Country: Australia
- State: Victoria
- Killed: 3
- Date apprehended: 31 July 1993

Paul Charles Denyer (born 14 April 1972, known briefly as Paula whilst in prison) is an Australian serial killer currently serving three consecutive sentences of life imprisonment with a non-parole period of 30 years for the murders of three young women in Melbourne, in 1993. Denyer became known in the media as the Frankston Serial Killer as his crimes occurred in the neighbouring suburbs of Frankston.

Later, during his imprisonment, when aged around 30, Denyer began identifying as a transgender woman, but was refused permission by prison authorities to wear make-up, receive sex reassignment surgery, or legally alter his name. In the 2022 Stan documentary No Mercy, No Remorse, presenter John Silvester (Senior Crime Reporter, The Age, Melbourne) states that Denyer has reverted to identifying as Paul. In 2023, Denyer became eligible and applied for release on parole, but had his application denied by the Adult Parole Board of Victoria.

== Early life ==
Paul Charles Denyer's parents, Anthony and Maureen, met and married in London in the early 1960s before migrating to Australia in 1965. Denyer, the third of their six children, was born on 14 April 1972 in Campbelltown, New South Wales, an outer suburb of Sydney. The family moved to Victoria in 1981 due to his father's new employment.

Denyer had difficulty fitting in among his peers in his new school, which led to problems with study and self-confidence that were worsened by significant weight gain during his teen years. At age 10, he slashed the throat of his sister's Care bear, and cut the throat of the family cat before hanging it in a tree. Just before turning 13, he was charged and cautioned for stealing a car. At age 15, he was arrested for assaulting a fellow student who had been forced to publicly masturbate.

Around this time his parents divorced. After leaving school, he had problems holding down jobs, was fired seven times, and failed a physical when trying to enter Victoria Police. In February 1993, Denyer started working at a boatbuilding firm in Seaford named Pro Marine. A short time after he began work, colleagues observed him making knives at work. Denyer's employment was terminated after several months due to his failure to complete assigned tasks.

== Crimes ==
Denyer, in the years before the murders, started to stalk and attack a number of women in and around the Melbourne suburb of Frankston leading to several crimes during a five-month period in 1993.

=== Break-ins and killing of animals ===
The first known incident attributed to Denyer occurred in February 1993, when Donna Vanes' Claude Street unit in Seaford was broken into. After an anonymous threatening call, Vanes was fearful of being alone. Vanes asked her boyfriend to take her and their new-born baby out while he delivered pizzas.

After being out for approximately an hour, they returned to the unit. After seeing blood on the floor and noticing that one of the cats was dead, the police were called. A police officer arrived and discovered the cat had been killed and dissected. A pornographic image had been placed on its body. Written in the cats blood above a stove were the words "Donna you're dead"

In the bathroom, police found Vane's two kittens also with their throats cut floating in the bath. Shaving cream had been sprayed over a mirror in the bedroom and more pornographic images had been posted over a wardrobe. These images had been slashed, as had other furniture. The intruder had placed a pornographic image, which had been slashed, inside the crib of Vane's baby.

Unwilling to stay at the unit, she moved in with her sister, who was living in the unit next to Denyer, and whose neighbour had also recently been the victim of a break-in slasher. After Denyer's arrest, he admitted to police he was responsible for the break-in, vandalism, and murdering Vanes' cats. Denyer stated to police that had Vanes been home, he'd have murdered her.

=== Murder of Elizabeth Stevens ===
The first known murder victim was 18-year-old Elizabeth Stevens, who had come to Melbourne from Tasmania in January 1993 to study at TAFE Frankston. She had moved to Melbourne to study in order to join the armed forces.

At approximately 7:00pm on the evening of Friday 11 June 1993, Stevens alighted a bus on Cranbourne Road, the closest stop to the home she was residing in on Paterson Avenue, Langwarrin, with her aunt and uncle. She had been living with the relatives for six months.

As she turned into Paterson Avenue, she was grabbed from behind and threatened with what looked like a gun. Stevens screamed. Her screams were not heard by anyone due to heavy rain and wind. She was told to be quiet and then escorted down Paterson Avenue. Her assailant held her hand so as not to draw suspicion, and several witnesses saw them walking past and assumed they were a couple.

The pair arrived at Lloyd Park Reserve. Stevens was at first sexually propositioned, then told he was no sexual threat. Stevens was strangled, stabbed, and had her throat cut. Her killer then stomped on her face, breaking several of her facial bones, then dragged a short distance to a culvert. She suffered several post-mortem injuries, including being stabbed and slashed across the torso.

Stevens had left a note that morning for her relatives, stating she would be studying at either the TAFE or city library and would be home at 8:00pm. When Stevens failed to arrive home, her relatives initially thought she may simply be running late. At 10:30pm, her uncle began driving around the area searching for her. The police were notified soon after and became concerned for Stevens after seeing the note she had written. Her body was discovered at around 5:00pm the following day by a man collecting pine branches. Stevens was killed only 250 metres from her home.

At the post-mortem, the examining forensic pathologist noticed petechial haemorrhages that indicated Stevens had been strangled. Cuts and abrasions to the face were observed. The pathologist concluded that, in their opinion: "The cause of death was aspiration of blood and haemorrhage from stab wounds to the neck in a woman whose neck has been compressed".

An extensive search was undertaken of the area both where the body was located and surrounding streets. A bag with books and documents in the name of Stevens was discovered, as was the blade of a knife. Every resident in the local vicinity was spoken to. Police rode the local bus to see if anyone onboard recognised Stevens. Investigators never discovered any solid leads on Stevens' movements or discovered clues that would solve her murder.

=== Attempted abduction of Rosza Toth ===
A month later, on Thursday 8 July, 41-year-old Rosza Toth alighted at Seaford railway station, and headed north along Railway Parade on her way home. Around 5:50pm, as she walked past Seaford North Reserve, she noticed a man loitering near the toilet block, and was attacked shortly after passing him. Toth was dragged towards the unlit park, but broke free after Denyer held a gun to her head, but she quickly realised it was fake. After an extended scuffle, she finally managed to break free. Shaken, and with light injuries, she ran back to the road, stopped a car, and was assisted by the driver back to her house where the police were called.

=== Murder of Deborah Fream ===
That same night, the second murder victim, 22-year-old Deborah Fream who lived near Kananook Station, Seaford, was abducted in her car in the early evening. She had left her 12-day-old son at home with a male friend when she went out at 7:00pm on a short trip to buy some milk for an omelette. By 8:00pm, when she still had not returned, he called her boyfriend, the police, and the local hospital seeking news of her whereabouts and possible accidents. The friend and boyfriend drove around trying to locate her, then reported her missing at Frankston Police Station. On the afternoon of Monday 12 July, a farmer found Fream's partially covered body on Taylors Road, Carrum Downs. Like Stevens, she had been strangled (this time with a cord), savagely slashed, and her throat cut.

=== Murder of Natalie Russell ===
On Friday 30 July, the third and final victim, 17-year-old schoolgirl Natalie Russell, was attacked while walking home from John Paul College. At the time there was media speculation, heightened public fear, and warnings from her school. Russell usually cycled to school with her brother but was driven on this day by her mother as a precaution. Leaving school early by herself, she took her usual short cut home to Frankston North, via a fenced walkway, now called Nat's Track in her memory, which passes between two golf courses on Skye Road.

At 8:00pm, Russell was reported missing to Frankston Police Station, and a police search soon found her body. She had been dragged from the path through a large hole in a wire fence into adjacent scrub. She had died in a similar manner to the others. During the attack she had put up a considerable fight, which assisted investigators due to DNA evidence being available at the scene.

== Investigation ==
Police became involved with the case after the incidents at Denyer's block of units, where the first slasher break-in occurred, and at Vanes' unit in February 1993. The murder of Stevens was the first incident to attract a large investigation, as did the disappearance of Fream, when a search was organised and scuba divers examined the Kananook Creek. No external forensic evidence was found at the Stevens scene, and no witnesses came forward.

With Fream, again, no foreign forensic evidence was found at the scene due to poor weather, but it was clear she had fought her attacker. Witnesses later recalled her car, a gray Nissan Pulsar, had been seen driving erratically and flashing its high-beam lights. Her unlocked car was located by police the next day at nearby Madden Street, and forensics found traces of Fream's blood inside, alongside a new dent in the front, and the driver's seat pushed back. Denyer later explained how, at the milk bar, he had found her car unlocked, had climbed into the back seat, and had threatened her with the replica gun shortly after she drove from the store.

After the second attack, and with Toth's description, she described her attacker as 18–20 years old, 180 cm tall, with a round face and blue-eyes, police drew up a profile of the suspect: a male, likely unemployed or with a menial job, likely a local resident, aged 18–24, average looking, and living alone.

As media scrutiny and community concern intensified, it was becoming clearer to police that these separate incidents may be connected. Investigators also suspected they may be linked to the disappearance of Sarah MacDiarmid in 1990 and the murder of Michelle Brown in 1992. In the lead up to the murder of Russell, 200 investigators were in the process of visiting 4,700 homes triangulated on Madden Street, Frankston. Codenamed "Operation Pulsar" after Fream's vehicle, the door knock was at the time the largest ever conducted by Victoria Police.

The Russell attack provided police with the breakthrough they needed. At 2:30pm, a postal worker saw a rusted yellow Toyota Corona without number plates parked near Nat's Track on Skye Road, with a man using binoculars, acting suspiciously inside. As she stopped at a house to call police, she noticed Russell approaching the track alone, observed by the suspicious man, who then ran up the track. Police responded, noted the registration label number, door-knocked a few nearby houses, but soon had to leave to attend to another call before the man returned.

Later forensic investigations of the walkway revealed three holes cut in the fence with the same tool, with blood traces on one, alongside skin and hair traces on Russell but not belonging to the victim. Police informed investigators of the registration details, which were quickly traced to the car's owner, Paul Charles Denyer. Detectives visited his small unit at 186 Frankston‑Dandenong Road, Seaford, the afternoon of 31 July – a unit shared with Denyer's girlfriend, and next door to Vanes' sister.

While his movements were being checked, he admitted to being in the vicinity of the Fream and Russell murders at the time. Denyer was then taken to Frankston Police Station, and his videoed interview began at 9:20pm. He was unable to adequately explain the cuts and scratches the officers noticed, and also admitted being in the area of the Stevens attack. He agreed to have his DNA collected, and early on 1 August, suspecting that the police had DNA evidence, admitted to the murders, the Toth assault, and the slasher break-ins. Denyer told detectives that he had been stalking women in the Frankston area "for years", and that the motivation for the crimes was a desire to kill from the age of 14 and a general hatred of girls and women.

== Trial and imprisonment ==
Denyer was charged with three murder counts and one of abduction, charges to which he later pleaded guilty and did not contest. Psychologists and experts examined Denyer, noting a lack of emotion regarding the crimes, a single-minded desire to kill, and the unusual randomness by which victims were chosen, leading to a diagnosis of sadistic personality disorder but not legal insanity.

He found intentional maltreatment of victims intensely gratifying taking pleasure in torment, anguish, distress, hopelessness and suffering of the victim. In contrast to simple anger, the behaviour of a sadistic personality is fully premeditated. He is not suddenly exploding with rage...The more aggressive he became, the more powerful he felt.

— Dr Ian Joblin – Denyer's treating forensic psychologist

During examination, he admitted being influenced by the 1987 film, The Stepfather. On 20 December 1993, after four days of hearings, he was sentenced in Melbourne's Supreme Court to three consecutive sentences of life imprisonment with no parole period. On 31 December, Denyer lodged an appeal, which was heard in July 1994 – granting him a non-parole period of 30 years, until 2023.

Denyer was initially sent to MAP, where he friended Robert Lowe, then to HM Prison Barwon, and is currently at Port Phillip Prison. In January 2004, after 10 years in jail, Denyer was the subject of a 7:30 Report titled "Murderer's sex change request sparks rights debate". In September 2004, news broke of a letter Denyer had sent to his estranged brother, who he had accused in his trial of sexually abusing him as a child, and sister-in-law who had re-emigrated to the UK.

In July 2012, Denyer again came to the attention of the media over allegations of four rapes conducted over a six-week period. In April 2013, the Herald Sun created a website with images of 14 letters, written by Denyer in 2003 and 2004 to another inmate, titled "The Paul Denyer Letters". On 8 April, the newspaper ran articles related to analyses of the letters and handwriting.

== Gender identity ==
According to the first of "The Paul Denyer Letters", dated 29 November 2003, Denyer began identifying as a woman that same year. Denyer has claimed that these feelings of gender dysphoria are what led him to seek revenge against women by murdering them. In "Letter 6", dated 4 February 2004, he wrote: "I committed these disgusting crimes ... not because I ever hated womankind, but because I have never really felt that I was male."

Denyer began wearing women's clothing and cosmetics in prison, in defiance of prison orders. Medical specialists evaluated whether Denyer could receive sex reassignment surgery and rejected the idea. Prisoner support groups said that he "cannot be anything but serious" about his transition, given that it would entail personal risk. One victim's mother said Denyer's transition made her and her husband feel "sick", calling it a "stunt".

Denyer has since reverted to identifying as Paul.

== Bid for parole ==
In 2023, Denyer became eligible and applied for release on parole, but had his application denied by the Adult Parole Board of Victoria. The Parole Board notified the families of the victims, including Natalie Russell's father Brian, and Deborah Fream's son Jake.

== Media ==
Australian author Vikki Petraitis has written a number of texts on the case:

- The Frankston Murders – the true story of serial killer, Paul Denyer, 1995
- "The Frankston Murders and The Paedophile Witch" in Outside the Law, 2008
- The Frankston Murders: 25 Years On, 2018

The case was covered by Casefile True Crime Podcast in June 2016. It was also covered by Australian True Crime in July 2018 when Petratis was interviewed and again in September 2017 when investigator Charlie Bezzina was interviewed. In 2023, a detailed 11-part podcast by Petratis called The Frankston Murders was released.

== See also ==
- Timeline of major crimes in Australia
- Crawford family murder
- Crime in Australia
- Tynong North and Frankston Murders
