= Murder of Bertha Schippan =

Unsolved Australian child murder

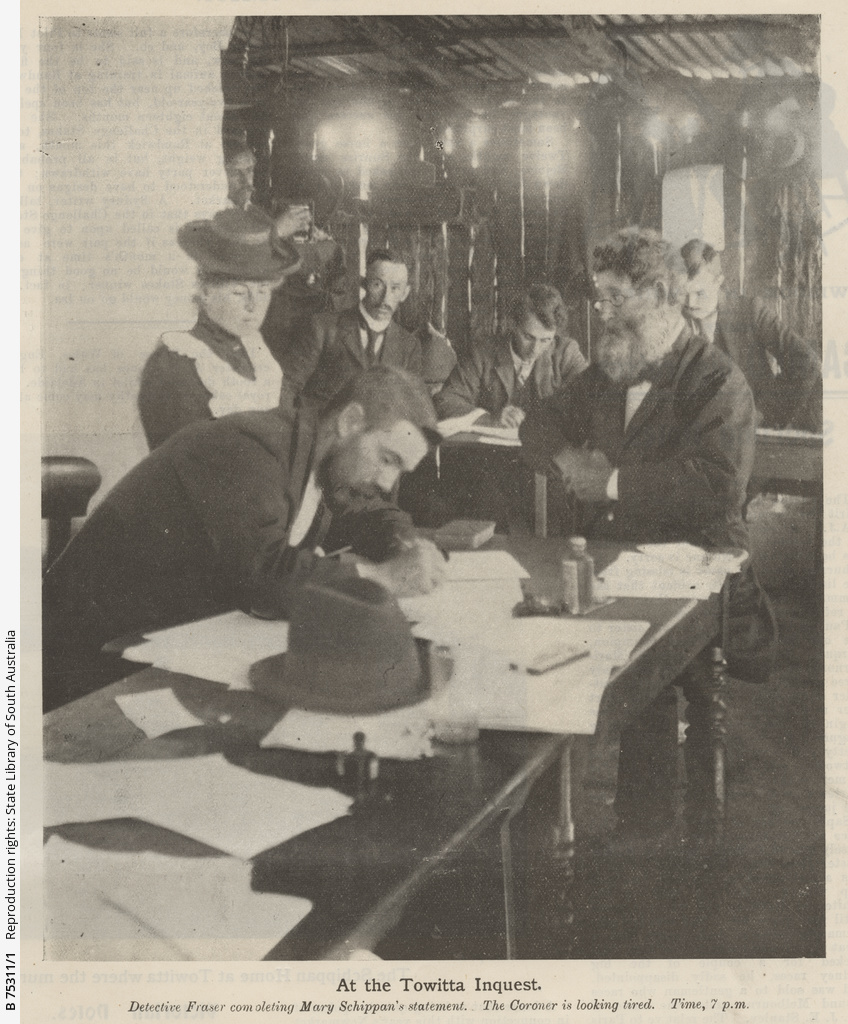
- At the Towitta Inquest. Detective Fraser completing Mary Schippan's statement. The Coroner is looking tired. Time 7 p.m.
- Date: 1 January 1902
- Location: Towitta, South Australia; 34°30′03.3″S 139°15′45.9″E
- Type: Murder
- Motive: Unknown
- Target: Bertha Schippan
- First reporter: Mary Schippan
- Coroner: Mr. Miligan, J.P.
- Accused: Mary Schippan
- Verdict: Not guilty

The murder of Johanne Elizabeth "Bertha" Schippan (January 1888 – 1 January 1902) is an unsolved Australian murder. The victim, the youngest child in a large Wendish family, resided in the South Australian town of Towitta, located approximately 6 km (3.7 mi) west of Sedan. She was murdered on the night of 1 January 1902, at the age of 13. Her 24-year-old sister, Maria “Mary” Auguste (10 Sept 1877 – 4 July 1919), was prosecuted for the crime but was eventually acquitted. Despite various theories, the case remains unsolved and continues to attract media attention.

== Circumstances of the crime ==
Bertha and Mary's parents, Matthes and Johanne, had left that day to visit relatives in Eden Valley. Three other siblings were away working on other farms, and the sisters' two younger brothers had decided to sleep in a nearby barn that night, leaving Bertha and Mary alone in the house. Mary claimed she awoke at 10 pm to find a bearded man lying across her chest. After wriggling free, she escaped the house to raise the alarm with her brothers, leaving her sister Bertha behind. Her brothers raised the alarm, finally notifying the local constable, but Bertha was found the next day violently murdered, having been stabbed and slashed around 40 times.

== Inquest and trial ==
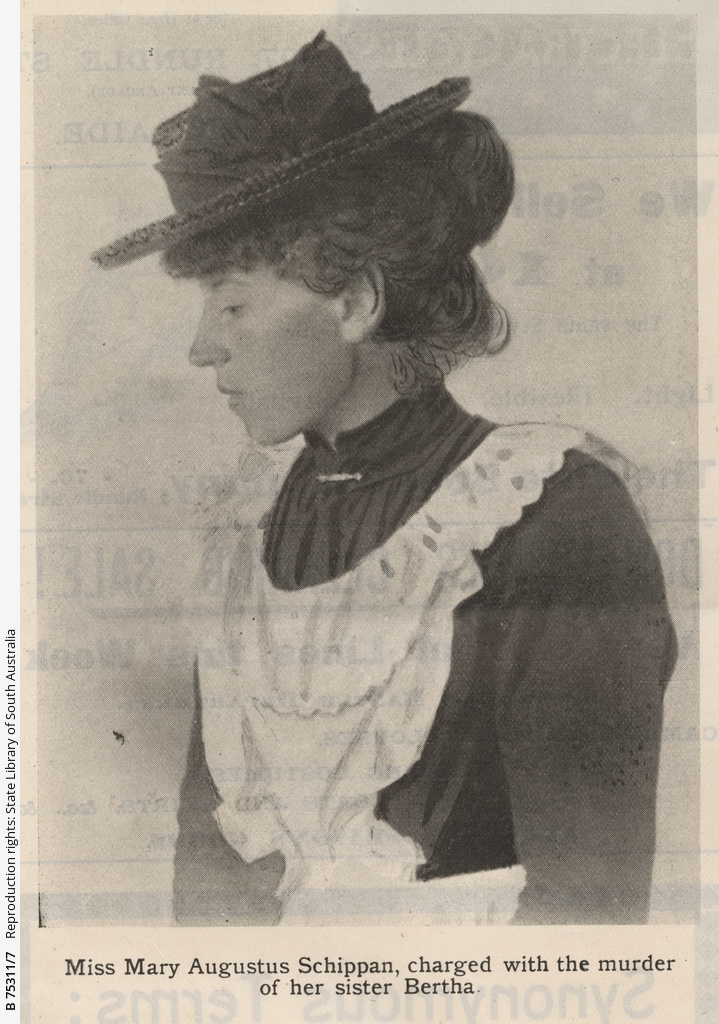
"Miss Mary Augustus Schippan, charged with the murder of her sister, Bertha". (Mary's middle name was actually "Auguste". This was likely a typo made by the writer.)

The inquest into Bertha's death, headed by the local Coroner, Dr Ramsey Smith, was held shortly afterwards, with suspicion quickly falling on Mary. Given the lack of contrary evidence, she was committed to stand trial in Adelaide.

At the trial before Chief Justice Sir Samuel Way, which commenced in March 1902, Mary was represented by Sir Josiah Symon K.C. The case was reported on extensively in the newspapers. Mary, who had been remanded in Adelaide Gaol, was finally acquitted, due to there only being circumstantial evidence of her guilt.

The nature of the case, and the lack of a conviction, led to media speculation that Mary's father, who had a history of violence, or her boyfriend, 21-year-old Gustav Nitschke, could have been responsible. While both of them had possible motives in preventing Bertha from revealing incriminating evidence, Nitschke had an alibi that he was in Adelaide, and it was deemed unlikely that Matthes could have ridden to the scene of the crime and back again in the dark.

== Media ==
In 1984, a film about the murder called The Schippan Mystery, was released. Directed by Di Drew, it was the last of four telemovies called Verdict produced by the ABC dramatising real Australian cases. A number of books and documentaries covering the case were later produced.

== See also ==
- List of unsolved murders in Australia
