= Murder of Frank Newbery =

2007 murder in Newcastle, Australia

Frank Newbery
- Born: 16 January 1920
- Died: 12 March 2007 (aged 87); Cooks Hill, New South Wales, Australia
- Cause of death: Blunt-force trauma
- Resting place: Woodburn Cemetery, New South Wales
- Occupation: Grocer
- Known for: Victim of unsolved homicide

On 12 March 2007, Frank Newbery was beaten to death inside his convenience store, Frank's Ham & Beef, in the inner-city suburb of Cooks Hill in the Australian city of Newcastle. The New South Wales Government offers a reward of $100,000 for any information leading to an arrest and conviction. As of May 2026, the case remained unsolved.

== Background ==
Newbery was a World War II veteran who operated Frank's Ham & Beef at 27 Union Street, Cooks Hill, Australia. He was elected as the "Best Grocer in the World" by the Cooks Hill community in 2001, for his 50 years of service. Franks Ham & Beef store had been open daily for 57 years prior to Newbery's death.

== Murder ==
Newbery is believed to have been attacked in his shop some time between 4:00pm and 4:30pm on 12 March 2007. He was bludgeoned with a "large blunt object" that was never found. His body was discovered concealed under cardboard boxes. Newbery's knuckles were bruised, indicating that he attempted to resist his attacker.

== Investigation ==
NSW Police initially believed the murder was a "robbery gone wrong", because the cash register had been opened and money was missing. Strike Force Rynan was established to investigate the incident.

However, it was confirmed that authorities found $1,500 in Newbery's pocket after the attack, which led police to consider the possibility that Newbery had been a victim of a targeted assault.

In 2012, a coronial inquest was held with Deputy State Coroner Mark Buscombe presiding. The result of the inquest suggested that Newbery had been "attacked by a person or persons that were unknown." The suspect was thought to be wearing a hat or beanie, dark clothing, and have long hair. Two witnesses reported seeing a man fitting this description crouching in the shop shortly after 4:00pm. Police analysed hundreds of other similar robberies, investigated prisoners on parole, and took DNA swabs from every person who visited the shop on the day of the murder. Two samples found at the scene remain unidentified.

In 2017, Detective Inspector Peter Mahon stated, "We are still not sure of the motive, because if it was a robbery, you would have thought that they would have searched Frank and taken his money out of his wallet."

== Aftermath ==
Police identified several suspects, including a man whose driver's license was found at the store. One suspect was a schizophrenic drug-addict and involuntary patient at a nearby mental health hospital, but had left the grounds twice on the day of the murder. The other was a man from Port Stephens who bragged about killing Newbery. Both suspects were later ruled out by police.

== See also ==
- List of unsolved murders in Australia
