= Wonnangatta murders =

Unsolved murders in Victoria, Australia

Coordinates: 37°12′30″S 146°49′52″E

The Wonnangatta murders occurred in late 1917 and 1918, in the remote Wonnangatta Valley in East Gippsland, Victoria, Australia. The victims were Jim Barclay, the manager of Wonnangatta Station, and John Bamford, a cook and general hand. Barclay was a well-respected and much-liked bushman, while Bamford was regarded with suspicion, and was known to be easily roused into violent tempers. The case has never been solved.

== Barclay and Bamford ==
In about 1916, James ("Jim") Barclay was employed as the manager of Wonnangatta Station, where he usually lived alone. In his late 40s, he had lost his wife to tuberculosis, and his new-born child, James (also "Jim"), was being cared for by relatives. Historian Harry Stephenson describes him as a "hardy and competent bushman ... a contented man of simple tastes". His nearest neighbour was Harry Smith, stepson of the original owner of Wonnangatta, with whom Barclay had a good relationship.

In December 1917, Barclay decided to employ a cook and station hand. English-born John Bamford had lived at Black Snake Creek, 12 miles (19 km) from Talbotville, for twenty years. By 1917, he was in his late 50s and was variously described as "surly", having a "wicked temper", and being suspected of "having strangled his wife". However, in their book, The Wonnangatta Murders, Keith Leydon and Michael Ray maintain that there is no evidence of that. What Barclay thought of Bamford is not known, but Talbotville storekeeper, Albert Stout, is known to have warned Barclay not to be "drawn into arguments with Bamford". With World War I raging and a dearth of men available for labour in the bush, Barclay probably had few choices regarding employees. Alan King, a stockman, who stayed at Wonnangatta in late December 1917, recalled that Bamford seemed to be on good terms with Barclay.

Barclay and Bamford were last seen alive in late December 1917. They had travelled to Talbotville to cast their votes in the so-called Reinforcement Referendum, the second of the two plebiscites held in Australia during World War I, to seek popular approval for the introduction of conscription to reinforce Australian troop numbers. It is not known how the two men voted, only that they agreed on their vote. They stayed the night with Albert Stout in Talbotville, before leaving for Wonnangatta at about 10 o'clock on the morning of 21 December.

== The discovery of the murder of Barclay ==
On 22 January 1918, Harry Smith arrived at the station to deliver mail. He found no sign of Barclay and Bamford, although the words "Home tonight" were chalked across the kitchen door. Smith stayed two nights but no one came home, so he returned to Eaglevale on 24 January 1918.

Smith returned to the Wonnangatta homestead late in the afternoon on 14 February 1918. The place was still deserted and the mail was still where he had left it, on the kitchen table. Smith was shocked to find Barclay's favourite dog starving and neglected. He briefly searched the area again, stayed the night at the homestead, and left for Dargo the next day to raise the alarm. There, he telegraphed the owners, Arthur Phillips and Geoffrey Ritchie of Mansfield.

On 23 February 1918, Arthur Phillips and stockman Jack Jebb arrived at Eaglevale from Mansfield. With Harry Smith, they returned to Wonnangatta. After a prolonged search, they discovered a badly decomposed body near the Conglomerate Creek, about "420 paces" south-east of the homestead. From the remaining pieces of clothing, a belt and a tobacco pouch, Smith identified it as Barclay. The body had been buried in a shallow grave, but dingos and foxes had apparently uncovered it. Newspaper reports that the skull was detached from the body at the time were incorrect. The skull was attached but protruding from the sand. The body was reburied and Phillips returned to Mansfield, where he contacted the police. Shortly after, Detective Alex McKerral was dispatched from Melbourne, together with Constable Ryan, a native of the Mansfield district.

Several days later, the police party set out from Mansfield on the 80-mile (130 km) ride across the Great Dividing Range to Wonnangatta, to collect Barclay's remains and return them for a post-mortem at Mansfield hospital. Wallace Mortimer recounts that the police party found strychnine in the pepper container when they prepared a meal in the homestead on the night of their arrival.

Police found a shotgun in Barclay's room that had recently been discharged, although there were no bloodstains in the room. His bed was in "a state of disorder". Bamford's room was also in some disarray, and his horse, saddle and some belongings were missing.

On the return journey, on the Howitt high plains, the police party came across the horse that John Bamford had ridden to Talbotville for the vote. It was running wild without a saddle or bridle.

== The post-mortem ==
The post-mortem found that Barclay had been murdered by a shotgun blast in the back, and had been dead for several weeks by the time of discovery. At the inquest that followed, Detective McKerral said: "I am of the opinion that Barclay and Bamford had an argument over working matters and that Bamford loaded the gun and shot Barclay. He removed his working clothes, and dressed himself in Barclay’s suit, which is missing, saddled his horse and after dragging the deceased to the creek, rode the horse away."

The verdict of the inquest was murder by person or persons unknown, probably sometime between 21 December 1917 and 4 January 1918. Jim Barclay's body was handed to his extended family, who lived on the Mornington Peninsula, and he was buried at Tyabb Cemetery.

== The discovery of Bamford’s body ==
Bamford was now the prime suspect, and a statewide search was begun. A reward of £200 was offered by the government for information regarding Barclay's murder. A man claiming to be Bamford, and claiming to have killed Barclay, was arrested near Yarram and charged. However, it was realised that the man was suffering from delusions. He was later identified as a vagrant known as James Baker.

In early November 1918, Mounted Constable Hayes, together with local bushmen Harry Smith, William Hearne and Jim Fry, were searching the Mount Howitt area when Hearne noticed a boot protruding from a pile of logs, near the Howitt Plains Hut. Under the pile, they found Bamford's body. As the route to Mansfield was still under snow, the body was taken 80 miles (130 km) to Dargo. The post-mortem found a bullet lodged in the skull and, at the inquest, a verdict of murder by person or persons unknown was handed down. Bamford's body was buried at Dargo Cemetery.

== Theories ==
Up to the time Bamford's body was found, it had been taken for granted that Barclay had been killed by Bamford. After that, there was speculation "that Bamford shot Barclay and afterwards, Bamford was shot by some friend of the manager, in revenge, in the good old wild west manner".

Police suspicion naturally fell on Harry Smith, but there was no direct evidence. In addition, he would have had to carry out a complex deception about the discovery of Barclay's body, and he was present at the discovery of Bamford's. It is also unlikely he would have knowingly allowed the body of his friend Jim Barclay to lie where the murderer left it and be disturbed by animals for three weeks. He was not charged. Writing in 1980, Harry Stephenson favoured the theory that Smith "might have had an answer to the mystery" and noted that older cattlemen were still reluctant to discuss the case.

A second theory was that the two men had been victims of stock thieves. Wallace Mortimer suggests that Barclay and, later, Bamford were perhaps killed by horse thieves, and cites "old timers [who] are adamant in their belief such was the reason". The police report refutes that idea, pointing out that the only livestock missing from Wonnangatta was Bamford's horse, which had been recovered on Mount Howitt.

Wallace Mortimer dismisses any significance in the fact that a right shoe and a hat were placed near the crotch of Barclay's body. According to Mortimer, the idea that it implied a motive for the killing Barclay, a ladies man, by a jealous husband, came from a novelist, "who had obviously done little or no research into the matter".

== Aftermath ==
After he finished his schooling, Jim Barclay's son, Jim junior, worked at Eaglevale with Harry Smith for many years. Smith died in 1945, aged about 86. Sometime in the late 1970s, Mortimer interviewed Jim junior for his history of Wonnangatta Station. Barclay's enigmatic comment on the murders was: "It was all a long time ago and both the murderers are long since dead. I can't see that anything can be gained now, it's all best forgotten."

== See also ==
- List of solved missing person cases (pre-1950)
- List of unsolved murders in Australia
