= Wonnangatta Station =

Historical cattle station in the Victorian Alps, Australia

Coordinates: 37°12′30″S 146°49′52″E

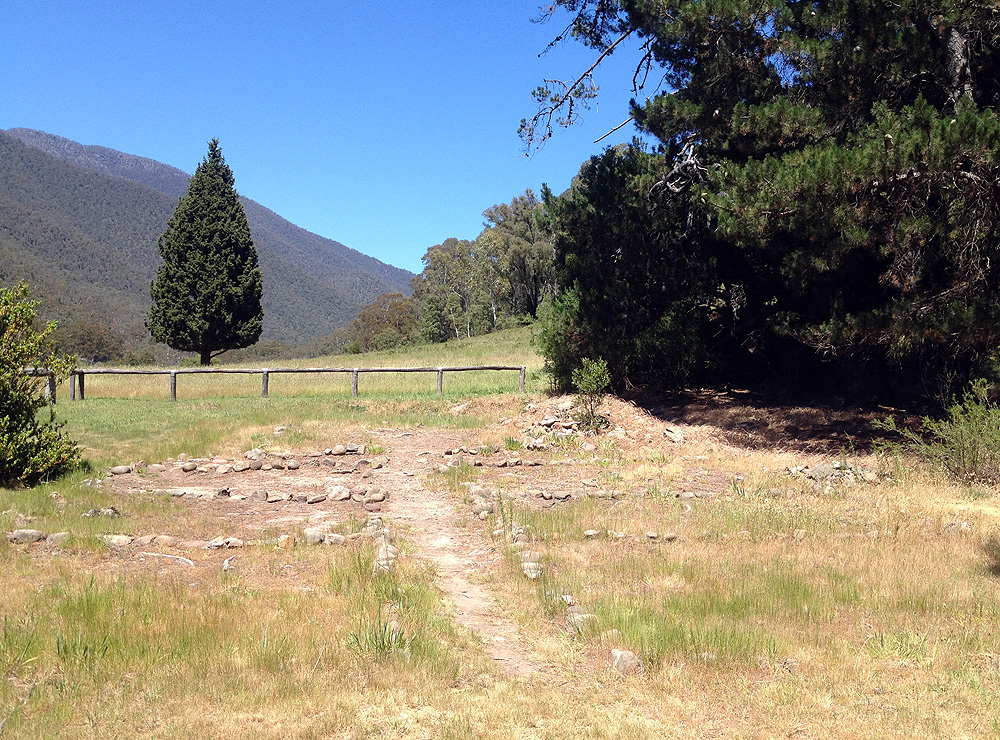
All that remains today of the Wonnangatta Station homestead. The stones outline the original floorplan.

Wonnangatta Station location

The Wonnangatta Station was a cattle station located in a remote valley of the Victorian Alps in Australia. According to writer Harry Stephenson the station, while it operated, was "the most isolated homestead in Victoria".

== Location ==
During the station's operation, the nearest population centres were the goldfield towns of Talbotville, about 30 kilometres (20 mi) away, Grant and Dargo to the south-east, and the larger town of Mansfield, about 130 kilometres (80 mi) away over the Great Dividing Range.

The Wonnangatta Station homestead was accidentally burnt down by bushwalkers in 1957. Some stockyards and the old cemetery, which has been restored to something resembling its original form, survive. Today the area is part of the Alpine National Park, and is only accessible by four-wheel drive vehicle, dirt bike, horse or foot. The station remains a popular off-road destination and has numerous facilities for campers, including long drop toilets and concrete fire pits.

== History ==
The station had been established in the 1860s by Oliver Smith, a North American who came across the valley while prospecting for gold. Smith's common law wife Ellen or "Nancy" and her son Harry joined him and a homestead was built near the junction of the Wonnangatta River and Conglomerate Creek.

Some time later Ellen died in childbirth, and soon after Smith sold out to William Bryce before eventually returning to the United States.

The Bryce family then occupied the station while Ellen's son Harry Smith moved down the valley and established himself at Eaglevale. The Bryce family remained a presence at Wonnangatta until Mrs Bryce died in 1914 at the age of 78. Ten Bryce children were brought up at Wonnangatta. As the children grew up they moved away and after Mrs Bryce's death the property was sold to Mansfield owners in 1916, who installed a manager to run the station.

== Wonnangatta murders ==
The station and surrounding area are the site of the still-unsolved Wonnangatta murders, which occurred in late 1917 and 1918.

== See also ==
- List of ranches and stations
