= Disappearance of Jimmy Taylor =

1974 missing child case in Australia

Jimmy Taylor
- Born: James Patrick Taylor; 1 November 1961
- Disappeared: 29 August 1974 (aged 12); Derby, Western Australia, Australia
- Status: Missing for 52 years, 1 month and 1 day Presumed dead by coroner

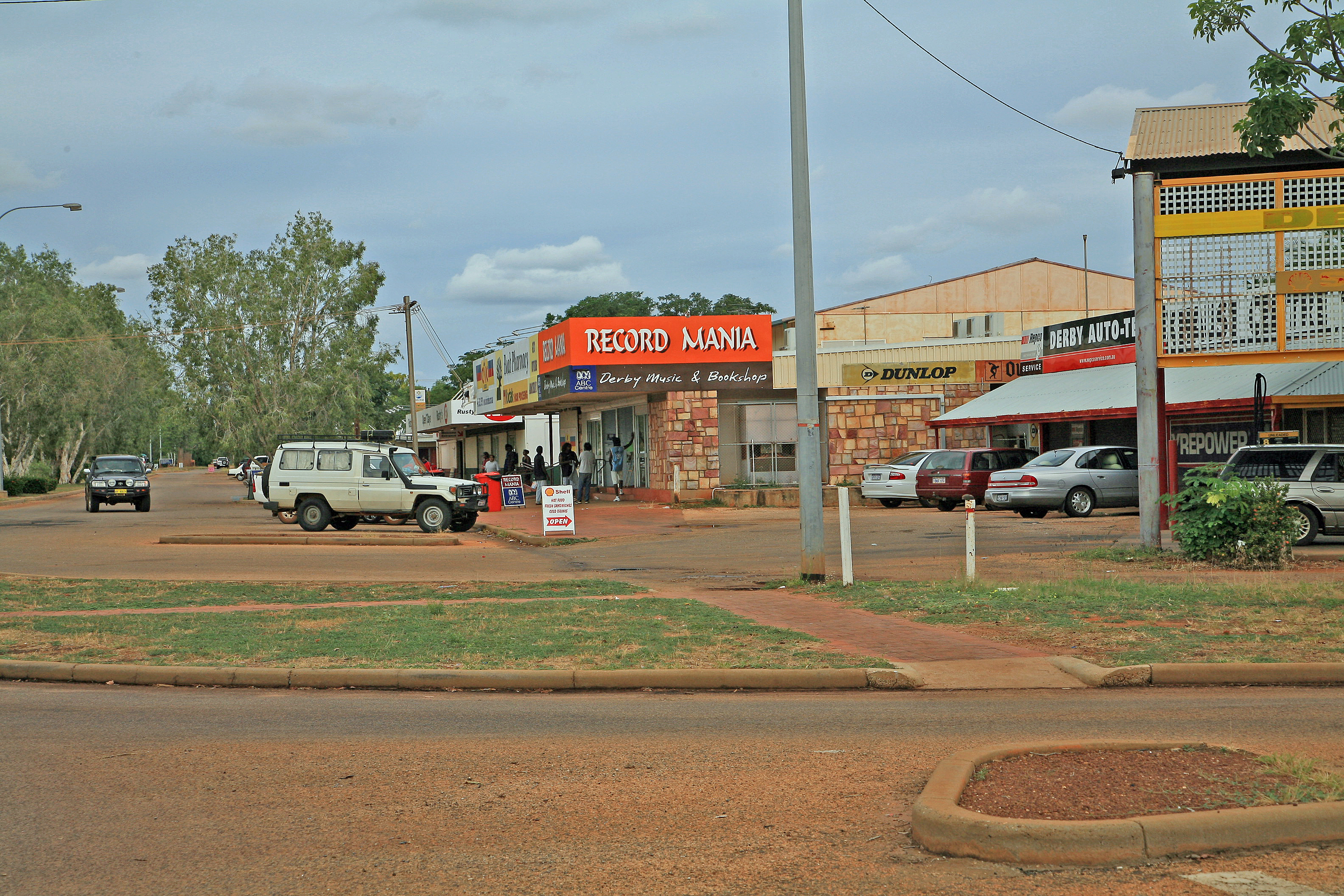
Derby near Loch Street

James Patrick Taylor (born 1 November 1961) was an Australian boy who disappeared at the age of 12 from Derby, Western Australia on 29 August 1974.

In 2014 a coroner ruled that Taylor, an Aboriginal boy, had died but was unable to determine when or how.

In May 2023 a $1 million reward was offered for information relating to Taylor's disappearance.

== Disappearance ==
In the late afternoon of 29 August 1974, Taylor had walked to a local shop called Lwoy's Deli to buy lollies and soft drinks for himself and his siblings. He had walked from his home in Knowsley Street to a shop on Loch Street barefoot but wearing his school uniform.

When he failed to return home, his family rationalised that he had met up with a friend and had stayed the night at their house. The family commenced searching for Taylor the following day and his father reported him missing at the Derby police station on 5 September 1974.

A witness later claimed to have seen a man driving a four-wheel-drive vehicle with an open tray carrying a 44-gallon drum approach Taylor. The witness claimed Taylor got into the vehicle.

== Investigation ==
The Western Australia Police Force investigated Taylor's disappearance. Their investigations concluded in 1979.

In August 2006, the Western Australia Special Crime Squad re-examined the investigation.

In October 2006, Taylor's family watched a television documentary on ABC TV about convicted child killer James Ryan O'Neill called The Fisherman: Journey into the mind of a killer, produced by journalist Janine Widgery, where they learned O'Neill had been living in Derby at the time of Taylor's disappearance.

The SCS review was completed in December 2006 with the detective senior constable who performed the review identifying three persons of interest, including O'Neill. He also recommended 28 investigative opportunities be pursued. However, he deemed the new investigation to be of low to medium priority given that the persons of interest posed a low risk to the community because O'Neill was imprisoned, another was dead, and the third was an elderly man aged over 60 who had not committed any offences since 1988.

In November 2011, the family publicly urged the police to again re-examine the case and the possible links to O'Neill. Consequently, police officers contacted Taylor's family to update them with the ongoing investigation.

In June 2013, Western Australia Police Special Crime Squad completed a report into Taylor's disappearance and suspected death, which was provided to the Office of the State Coroner.

== Coronial inquest ==
In June 2014, it was announced that the West Australian Coroner Barry King would hold an inquest into Taylor's disappearance at the Derby Court House in October 2014.

A three-day coronial inquest was held from 8 October 2014 to 10 October 2014. O'Neill gave evidence during the inquest via videolink from the Tasmanian prison where he was serving his sentence, in which he denied any involvement with Taylor's disappearance.

The inquest was also told that the police originally tasked to investigate Taylor's disappearance did not consider foul play. They presumed the boy had run away from home to escape an unhappy home environment which included an alcoholic father who occasionally beat family members. All family members disputed that Taylor's father was ever a violent man, and said that until his death he had never stopped looking for his son. Taylor's sister Heather Winifred Taylor said that her brother's disappearance had also traumatised her mother who began drinking and continued to cry for years.

Documentary maker Janine Widgery also gave evidence in relation to her documentary about O'Neill. She said she had wanted to follow up a potential association between O'Neill and the missing Beaumont children, and said O'Neill had only agreed to being part of the program under the guise of the worm farm he owned while in prison and his trips around Australia.

At the conclusion of the inquest, King recorded an open finding.

Although King found that it was beyond all reasonable doubt that Taylor had died, it was unable to be determined when he had died or what had caused his death.

King said that while it was possible Taylor had been kidnapped and murdered, there was insufficient evidence to suggest that it was what had occurred. King said he was also unable to conclude whether O'Neill had abducted or killed Taylor.

Taylor's family said that they accepted the findings, stating: "Based on the evidence provided to the coroner we accept the findings of his report and are pleased that Jimmy's case remains open. We feel that some justice has been given to Jimmy. He was a young boy who went to the shop and never came back. We have never stopped hoping he would come home and have loved him and missed him every day for 40 years. Grief is a private matter and we have never stopped grieving for Jimmy and will carry this grief forever."

== One million dollar reward ==
In May 2023 it was announced that a $1 million reward was being offered to anyone who provided information as to what had happened to Taylor.

== Criticism of initial investigation ==
Taylor's sister Lyn Henderson-Yates accused the police of failing to properly investigate her brother's disappearance and as well as the potential involvement of James Ryan O'Neill.

Writing in The Stringer, social justice advocate Gerry Georgatos described "he had gone walkabout" attitude from the Western Australia Police Force as "racist bullshit". He criticised the amount of resources which are used to investigate white deaths as opposed to deaths of First Nations Australians like Taylor. Georgatos also opined that deaths of First Nations Australians don't attract the same level of media attention as deaths of white Australians, comparing the disappearance of Taylor and the Bowraville murders to cases such as the disappearances of Daniel Morcombe, and the Beaumont children.

== See also ==
- List of people who disappeared mysteriously: 1910–1990
- List of unsolved murders in Western Australia
