= Deb Webber =

Debra "Deb" Webber is an Australian psychic medium.

== Works ==
Webber has worked extensively as a psychic medium throughout Australia and New Zealand. She has her own company named Seeds of Energy Pty Ltd, which was started in 2003. She is known for appearing on New Zealand television series Sensing Murder. On the show, she works as a psychic detective to help find evidence relating to unsolved murder cases. Webber also writes a regular column, titled Life After Deb, in Australian magazine Woman's Day.

== Controversy ==
Critics have pointed out her show uses cold reading and other techniques used by entertainers like Derren Brown.

=== Caught on Hidden Camera ===
On 13 August 2004 Australian Channel 7 broadcast a show called "Caught on Hidden Camera", in which they asked Webber to give readings to three people. The three asked to contact deceased relatives that did not exist. Webber claimed she was able to 'contact' these people. This was later screened in New Zealand on the show Eating Media Lunch as "Sensing Bullshit".

=== TVNZ psychic disagreement ===
"I was walking past the television and [Aisling] popped up, and I went 'oh, she's in a ditch, hole, in West Auckland. That's what I got, instantly".

— Deb Webber to Paul Henry on Breakfast

Webber was involved in controversy regarding a high-profile missing child case in New Zealand in October 2009. The family of missing child Aisling Symes were introduced to Sensing Murder medium Webber by state broadcaster Television New Zealand (TVNZ), a move which was criticised in the media due to Aisling only having disappeared two days previously. One policeman said when questioned if the New Zealand police would use comments made by Webber on television show Breakfast: "I'm totally aghast - it seems like a totally commercial play". TVNZ responded with the following statement: "We're not trying to push a psychic message to make money and get ratings". Hundreds of e-mails were sent to the station.

== See also ==
- Jeanette Wilson
- Kelvin Cruickshank
