= Crispin Dye =

Australian musician & manager)

- Born: Crispin Wilson Dye; 1 June 1952; Sydney, Australia
- Died: 25 December 1993 (aged 41); St George Hospital, New South Wales
- Cause of death: Homicide
- Other name: Cris Kemp
- Education: Newington College; University of New South Wales
- Occupations: Musician, band manager
- Years active: 1980–1993
- Notable work: Fly on the Wall (contributor)
- Spouse(s): Single; Never married

Crispin Wilson Dye (1 June 1952 – 25 December 1993), who sang using the stage name of Cris Kemp, was an Australian musician and the manager of hard rock bands AC/DC and Rose Tattoo. His killing in December 1993 has remained unsolved and was re-investigated in 2023.

== Family ==
Dye was born in Sydney and grew up on the Upper North Shore. He was the younger son of Jean Mabel (née Kemp) and Ian Aubrey Wilson Dye. His older brother Brenton Wilson Dye was born in 1949. His father predeceased him in 1983 but his mother lived until the age of 95 and died in 2018. At the 2023 investigation into Dye and other gay men's murders his second cousin Lisa Colnan and his friend and Sydney barrister Richard Cobden SC followed the proceedings closely as his older brother Brenton had by that time died. Cobden is a former President of the Sydney Gay and Lesbian Mardi Gras.

== School and university years ==
In 1959 Dye commenced as a student at the Killara Preparatory School of Newington College in First Class. In the 1960s a classmate at Newington Prep was Alan Sandow who later became a drummer with the rock band Sherbet. In 1965 Dye moved to the senior campus of Newington at Stanmore where the Headmaster was the Methodist Minister the Rev. Douglas Trathen. After a century of conservative Christian education Newington, as a Sydney GPS School, had started to become more progressive with Trathen appointing younger masters with arts backgrounds to the staff. In an era where social evolution was rapid the College Council under the Chairmanship of Talbot Duckmanton, the staff and students were often seen to be in relative turmoil. As a high school student Dye was a member of the Newington College Cadet Unit rising to the rank of Cadet Under Officer (CUO) in 1969. That year the unit celebrated its Centenary and the Cadet Band were under the direction of Alan Bellhouse AM. The Drum Major's Prize awarded by 2 Cadet Brigade was won by Newington at its Centennial Parade. In 1970 as a student with artistic leanings Dye was involved in the school's production of The Tempest. It was produced by a Newington English teacher Max Iffland who later taught the history of theatre at NIDA and directed theatre professionally at the Q Theatre in Sydney. The play was staged in the style of the rock musical Hair. The senior art master at Newington Paul Delprat performed in the cast as did school student Graham Davis who after leaving Newington became a Walkley Award and Logie Award winning journalist. The original Australian production of Hair premiered in Sydney in June 1969 and was produced by Harry M. Miller and directed by Jim Sharman. The musical criticizes and satirizes racism, discrimination, war, violence, pollution, sexual repression, and other societal evils and clearly had a substantial impact on teenage school students of the time. Dye composed original music for the Newington production of The Tempest with fellow student John Taberner. Taberner went on to be a lawyer and partner in the firm Freehill Hollingdale Page (now known as Herbert Smith Freehills). The students who produced The Tempest were given permission to publish a school magazine which they named Caliban. The seven issues of the magazine were hand-duplicated and eagerly read as the publication covered many then contentious subjects. In the third issue Dye and Ian Penn interviewed the controversial English-Australian sportswoman and educationalist Betty Archdale in her final year as headmistress of the Sydney independent girls school Abbotsleigh. Archdale was credited with breaking down the rigid system of discipline at the school, introducing sex education, and abandoning gloves and hats as part of the school uniform. She also reformed the curriculum, introducing physics and cutting back on British, in favour of Australian, history. That year she was a popular guest speaker at a senior assembly at Newington. Dye's class mate and fellow Caliban interviewer, Ian Penn, was born and raised in Australia of Holocaust survivor parents. After studying medicine and a career in interventional cardiology in Canada Penn received the Contemporary Art Society of Vancouver Emerging Artist Award in Visual Arts. In June 1970, at the height of the political crisis about Australia's involvement in the Vietnam War and in Dye's last year of high school, Douglas Trathen wrote a letter to the Sydney Morning Herald speaking out against conscription and calling on young men to defy the National Service Act. In the ensuing public debate Dye became an ardent supporter of his pacifist headmaster. In the Higher School Certificate Dye passed Second Level English, Third Level Science, First Level Modern History, Second Level Geography, First Level Art and General Studies.

In 1971 Dye commenced studying in the Faculty of Arts at the University of New South Wales. The following year as a moratorium activist he burnt his Vietnam call up notice on the library lawn at Kensington while singing peace songs. During 1971, 1972 and 1973 Dye was seen in print in the university magazine Tharunka promoting events where he sang as a folk artist. He graduated with a Bachelor of Arts in General Studies at UNSW on 24 April 1974.

== Adult life and music career ==
As an adult Dye lived in both Cairns and Willoughby. In the early 1980s he worked for Albert Music supporting rock band AC/DC, before taking over as the band's manager from Ian Jeffrey. During his ten years managing the band, Dye won a gold record for his role in the production of their album Fly on the Wall (1985).

Dye also managed the rock band Rose Tattoo and worked with The Easybeats. He was also a pop rock musician; using the stage name Cris Kemp for solo musical works. In 1993, on lead vocals and acoustic guitar, he released his first and only solo album A Heart Like Mine, which was produced by Alex Smith via Larrikin Records. All eleven tracks were written by Dye including We Are not in Love, co-written with Simon Gallaher.

== Death and aftermath ==
Dye was attacked by three men in Darlinghurst, Sydney on 23 December 1993. During the previous evening he had been celebrating the release of his album. Dye was intoxicated at the time of the attack, which occurred at around 4:30 a.m. near the corner of Little Oxford Street and Campbell Street, near Taylor Square, Sydney. His attackers stole his wallet. He was found unconscious in the lane behind Kinselas Hotel and taken to St Vincent's Hospital. He died in St George Hospital on 25 December.

Police investigated Dye's killing in 1993. An inquest also took place from 1994 to 1995. The results of the inquest were inconclusive, but linked his death to a statement made by a prisoner who said that he had "knocked off" Dye. In 2013, Dye's killing appeared in a Fairfax Media production about unsolved murders. In 2014, police offered a $100,000 reward for information on his killing.

In 2023, his death continued to be investigated by police. Dye's sexuality was ambiguous to some of his friends, who believed he was possibly gay or bisexual. In 2014, Dye's mother told The Sydney Morning Herald that he spoke of his many girlfriends and quoted Crispin saying "People say I'm gay, Mum, but I don't know what I am." The 2023 police investigation considered that his death may be linked to his sexual identity. Earlier investigations had primarily considered robbery as the motive due to the location of the attack being commonly associated with street robberies.

The 2023 investigation also noted that prior police work did not include forensic analysis of the blood-soaked clothing that Dye was found in after his attack. 2023 DNA analysis identified a new person of interest, associated with DNA found at an unrelated 2002 burglary.

== See also ==
- List of AC/DC members
- List of unsolved murders in Australia
