= Bandali Debs =

Australian convicted serial killer (born 1953)

Bandali Michael Debs
- Born: 18 July 1953 (age 73); Narre Warren, Victoria, Australia
- Occupation: Roof tiler
- Children: 5
- Convictions: Murder (x4), Armed robbery
- Penalty: 4 consecutive life sentences plus 27 years without parole

Bandali Michael Debs (born 18 July 1953) is an Australian convicted serial killer currently serving four consecutive terms of life imprisonment plus 27 years for the murder of two Victoria Police officers in August 1998 and for the 1997 murder of teenager Kristy Harty. Debs was detained at HM Prison Barwon in Victoria. On 12 December 2011, Debs was convicted of the April 1995 shooting murder of New South Wales sex worker Donna Ann Hicks. He is portrayed by Australian actor Greg Stone in the telemovie Underbelly Files: Tell Them Lucifer was Here.

== Personal life ==
Debs was born Edmund Plancis on 18 July 1953. While Debs has avoided discussion about his childhood, in a newspaper report in 2003 his brother claimed he and Debs were tortured as children; there is no firm evidence for this claim. Debs, from Narre Warren, a south eastern suburb of Melbourne, was employed as a tiler. He fathered five children, the youngest of whom, Joseph, was found dead due to a suspected drug overdose at a house in Greensborough in December 2003.

== Silk–Miller police murders ==
In February 2003, Debs was convicted and sentenced to two consecutive terms of life imprisonment with no minimum term for the murders of two Victoria Police officers, Sergeant Gary Silk and Senior Constable Rodney Miller at Moorabbin, Victoria on 16 August 1998.

Jason Joseph Roberts, who police alleged was an accomplice and who was 22 at the time of sentencing, was also convicted of the police murders and sentenced to two consecutive terms of life imprisonment with a minimum term of 35 years. This decision was quashed and Roberts was acquitted by a jury in July 2022.

== Murder of Kristy Harty ==
On 20 June 2005, police charged Debs with the murder of teenager Kristy Mary Harty, who was murdered at Upper Beaconsfield on 17 June 1997.

Harty was soliciting for sex along the Princes Highway when she met with Debs. The pair drove to a secluded bush track in Upper Beaconsfield where they had unprotected sex. Harty was later murdered; cause of death was a single gunshot wound to the back of her head. Her semi-naked body was found lying face down by bushwalkers.

DNA tests revealed that semen located on the body of Harty was a match for Debs.

In May 2007, Debs was convicted of the murder of Harty and sentenced to a third consecutive term of life imprisonment.

In sentencing Debs, Justice Kaye remarked:

Your murder of Ms Harty was entirely senseless, needless and wanton. The evidence discloses beyond any doubt that this was not a case of a sexual encounter in which, in the heat of the moment, feelings or passions may have led to a spontaneous and irrational act of violence. Rather, and quite to the contrary, this was, most clearly, a callous, craven and senseless murder in cold blood of an entirely innocent, defenceless and vulnerable young woman. The evidence leads to the inevitable conclusion that you murdered Kristy Harty for no other reason than for the sheer sake of it.

== Murder of Donna Anne Hicks ==
Donna Anne Hicks was shot dead in April 1995 in Western Sydney. She had been drinking at the Colyton Hotel, after which she got into a four-wheel drive, which matched a car owned by Debs.

Having been entered into a DNA database of criminals, Debs was subsequently linked to the case through DNA analysis. On 30 September 2008, New South Wales Homicide detectives interviewed Debs and raided his previous address in Sydney. On 12 December 2011, he was found guilty of Hicks' murder in the New South Wales Supreme Court, and he was sentenced to a fourth consecutive life-term sentences for the murder.

While in the court hearing for Jason Roberts’ 2022 re-trial for the Silk–Miller police murders, Debs admitted that he did indeed kill Hicks.

== Prison life ==
While imprisoned, Debs has undertaken psychology classes, life skills and computer training and is employed as a prison carpet cleaner. He has been considered a suspect in numerous other murders, such as that of Sarah MacDiarmid.

== See also ==
- List of serial killers by country
