= Jayne Furlong =

New Zealand murdered teenager

- Born: New Zealand
- Disappeared: 26 May 1993 (age 17); Auckland
- Cause of death: Homicide
- Other name: Jane Furlong
- Parents: Michael Furlong (father); Judith Furlong (mother)

Jayne Furlong, also referred to as Jane Furlong, was a New Zealand teenager from Auckland who disappeared from a street in Auckland on 26 May 1993 while working in the sex trade. She had been abducted and murdered.

== Disappearance ==
Her remains were found south west of Auckland at Sunset Beach, Port Waikato, on 19 May 2012 after being exposed by erosion of a sandbank. They were positively identified by DNA. At the time of her disappearance, Furlong was due to testify as a witness for the prosecution in two separate legal cases – one involving gang members accused of an assault, and the other relating to a businessman charged with brutal attacks on sex workers. A year after the remains were found, Detective Inspector Mark Benefield said that Furlong's ex-partner, who reported her missing on 28 May 1993, some of her former associates and some of those involved in the court cases, had declined to speak to police.

== Investigation ==
In 2012, after the remains were found, police released a film made in 1993 for the Crimewatch TV-program. The film shows a re-enactment of street scenes at the time Furlong went missing, with her boyfriend playing himself and narrated by the show's host, broadcaster Ian Johnstone.

Her murder investigation is ongoing and police are still probing old information. A Facebook page was set up in 2012 to help with inquiries.

Two witnesses claim to have overheard a confession to the killing of Furlong by a career criminal during 2003; the police said their information contained factually incorrect information (namely her place of burial. He said he'd buried her by a bridge in Te Atatu) – so their potential leads were not further investigated.

== Aftermath ==
In 2007, her case was featured on the television series Sensing Murder.

Following discovery of Furlong's remains, her mother urged anyone who knew what happened to her daughter to come forward. A funeral service was held at St George's Anglican Church in Epsom, Auckland in July 2012.

On 9 June 2019, the case was featured on the New Zealand television show Cold Case. Police said they had a person of interest, who had sold Furlong and her partner drugs and had been owed money by them. This person had a connection to Sunset Beach.

In August 2019, a parole board hearing was held for Wayne Michael McGrath, who is nearing the end of a 5-year, 4-month prison sentence for raping Furlong's friend Amanda Wolfe. At his trial, McGrath had publicly identified himself as a suspect in the Furlong murder, but police have never confirmed whether he is or was a suspect. Before her disappearance, Furlong and her boyfriend were in a dispute with McGrath over a vehicle which ended in a violent confrontation in west Auckland. McGrath's brother said that McGrath had spent time at a family-owned bach at Sunset Beach. McGrath was not granted parole; further parole board hearings will take place before his sentence ends in May 2020.

== See also ==
- List of kidnappings
- Lists of solved missing person cases
- List of unsolved murders (1980–1999)
