= List of unsolved murders in Western Australia =

As of May 2023, there are 64 unsolved cold case homicides and suspicious long term missing persons in the state of Western Australia, ranging from 1958 to 2016. Each case has a reward of $1 million for information leading to a conviction. One more case was added to the list in 2026: the homicide of Erica Coyne and her son Lloyd Mitchell, the state's first unsolved homicide in a decade, and one has been solved: the murderer of Sharon Fulton was convicted in 2026.

== Unsolved homicides ==
Year	Victim	Age
1958	Barbara May Williams	26
1963	Jens Braendgaard	17
1969	Anne Cecille Zappelli	22
1974	Norman Weston Toms	58
1974	Gwenneth Graham	46
1975	Shirley June Finn	33
1977	James Paul Kelly	52
1978	John Tzellaidis	41
1978	Unidentified adult male (Chidlow)	—
1979	Kerryn Mary Tate	22
1979	Felicia Maria Wilson	19
1980	Pauline Juliet Walter	22
1980	Annette Caroline Deverell	29
1982	Brian Michael Garlett	26
1982	Adelma Margaret O'Mara	50
1983	Maybell Yamalulu	16
1986	Barbara Anne Western	38
1988	Unidentified male skeletal remains (Newman)	—
1989	Unidentified male infant (Leederville)	—
1990	Paul Andrew McKinnon	22
1991	Kerry Suzanne Turner	18
1993	Julie Buck	23
1993	Unidentified male infant (Victoria Park)	—
1997	Gerard James Ross	11
1999	Andrew Podpinka	43
2001	Michael Anderson	4 months
2001	Laura Kate Muckersie	20
2003	Darylyn Meridith Ugle	25
2005	Alfonzo Piano	40
2006	Zbigniew Boguslaw Oleksiuk	52
2007	Unidentified male infant (Malaga)	—
2007	Corryn Veronica Anne Rayney	44
2007	Stacey Robyn Thorne	35
2008	Jacek Chlebny	55
2009	Robert George Dalliston	69
2010	Joshua Warneke	21
2014	Amy Lee Wensley	24
2015	Ray Kehlet	47
2016	Valeria Fermendjin	70
2026	Erica Coyne	69
2026	Lloyd Mitchell	50

== Suspicious long term missing persons ==
Year	Missing person	Age
1970	Helen Evonne Barker	14
1974	James Patrick Taylor	12
1974	Raelene May Eaton	16
1974	Yvonne Kaye Waters	17
1976	Mary Jennings	65
1977	Lorraine Kessey	21
1978	Rona Louise Edwards	26
1980	Lisa Marie Mott	12
1984	Evan Parker	37
1986	Cheryl Renwick	33
1988	Julie Leanne Cutler	22
1993	Richard Milgin	24
1994	Nicola La Falce	37
1996	Sarah Ellen Spiers	18
1998	Magdeleen Marguerite Dempster	27
1998	Lisa Jane Brown	19
1999	Petronella Albert	23
1999	Lisa Joanne Govan	28
2000	Sarah Anne McMahon	20
2001	Rebecca Delalande	23
2003	Wayne Dennis George Drewett	57
2010	Iveta Mitchell	37
2012	Charles Athostan Park	67
2015	Jennie Kehlet	49

== See also ==
- List of unsolved murders in Australia
