= Kelvin Cruickshank =

New Zealand psychic medium

- Born: Ngāruawāhia
- Occupation: Psychic medium
- Known for: Sensing Murder
- Family: Javan (Son)

Kelvin Cruickshank is a New Zealand psychic medium. Kelvin Cruickshank was born and raised in the Waikato region of New Zealand. Cruiskshank was known for being on the New Zealand television show Sensing Murder. During 2020 Crusikshank was working on Reel and Rifle with KC, a planned outdoor adventure show.

== See also ==
- Jeanette Wilson
- Deb Webber
