= Murder of Mima McKim-Hill =

1967 murder case in Australia

Mima Joan McKim-Hill
- Born: 1945
- Died: 1967 (aged 21)
- Cause of death: Strangulation
- Body discovered: Collard Creek, near Biloela

Mima Joan McKim-Hill (1945–1967) was a 21-year-old Australian woman who was abducted, sexually assaulted and strangled on 9 March 1967.

Her murder remains an unsolved cold case.

== Background ==
McKim-Hill was a home management advisor for the Capricornia Regional Electricity Board in Rockhampton, Queensland. As part of her job, McKim-Hill regularly travelled throughout Central Queensland promoting services and demonstrating new electrical appliances for customers.

McKim-Hill left Rockhampton at 8:00 am on 9 March 1967, and travelled south to Calliope. Her car was found abandoned at 3:00 am the following morning on the Gladstone by-pass road, three kilometres (1.9 mi) north of Benaraby.

Her body was found on 26 March 1967 at Collard Creek alongside the Dawson Highway, northeast of Biloela, eighty kilometres (50 mi) from where her car had been found.

McKim-Hill's funeral was held at St Paul's Cathedral, Rockhampton on 4 April 1967. McKim-Hill's remains were cremated at the Rockhampton Crematorium the same day.

During the investigation, police followed two lines of enquiry. They searched for four men seen travelling in the local area in a Ford Customline, but they were never located. In 2011, the police said those men were still of interest. A truck driver carting tallow was also of interest to police during the investigation.

An inquest into McKim-Hill's murder commenced on 6 November 1967 and concluded on 16 January 1968, during which time 26 witnesses gave evidence and a solicitor for the victim's family named a German truck driver as a "suspect".

== Renewed interest ==
Although now based in Perth, McKim-Hill's friend and former colleague Shirley Eldridge contacted Rockhampton's local newspaper The Morning Bulletin in 2007 near the 40th anniversary of the murder. Following the publication of newspaper stories relating to the Rockhampton woman's murder, public interest in the case was successfully reignited.

In March 2008, after lobbying from Eldridge and retired Fire and Rescue Officer Trevor Sorenson, the Queensland Police Service agreed to reopen the cold case investigation.

The Queensland Police Service made assurances in 2010 that they were still looking into the McKim-Hill murder.

In 2014, a $250,000 reward was approved for anyone who gave information which led to the apprehension and conviction of those responsible for McKim-Hill's murder.

Eldridge released a book, Mima: a case of abduction, rape and murder in 2016.

In the book, Eldridge names the German truck driver suspected of killing McKim-Hill and claims that Queensland police officers were preparing to travel to South Australia in 2009 to arrest him for murder, but the suspect had died in Tailem Bend six weeks previously so no arrest was possible.

Although, the Queensland Police Service wouldn't verify the allegations Eldridge made in her book, Eldridge's naming of the German truck driver as the likely suspect was repeated in the media. Eldridge and Sorenson have both said that the truck driver had been driving a two-tone green Leyland Beaver forward-control Prime Mover for Mayne Nickless, towing a trailer of tallow which was being transported to Sydney from the meatworks at Nerimbera.

Both Eldridge and Sorenson have been highly critical of the way police handled the original disappearance and murder investigations.

In 2018 and 2019, The Morning Bulletin reported that a former long-distance truck driver had come forward following a television appearance by Eldridge in late 2016. It was reported that he had also worked for Mayne Nickless and had reached out to the Queensland Police Service Cold Case Unit in March 2017 with potentially crucial evidence relating to the sighting of the suspect's abandoned vehicle about the time of the murder, but it wasn't until September 2018 that he was approached by investigators for information. The newspaper criticised the delay, describing it as "perplexing" that it took that amount of time for investigators to follow up a lead.

Trevor Sorenson was planning to submit a second application to Queensland Attorney-General Yvette D'Ath in 2019, to request the re-opening of the original inquest or for a second inquest into McKim-Hill's murder to be conducted. That application was duly submitted but was again dismissed by the Attorney-General on the basis of the cold case still being actively investigated by the Queensland Police Homicide Cold Case Unit.

In 2019, police advised that the McKim-Hill murder remains an open and ongoing cold case homicide investigation by the Cold Case Investigation Team within the Homicide Group, which is being constantly reviewed with new information investigated thoroughly.

The police also said they were committed to solving the murder to bring answers to McKim-Hill's family.

== See also ==
- Death of Flora Prior
- List of kidnappings
- Lists of solved missing person cases
- List of unsolved murders (1900–1979)
