= Disappearance of Sarah MacDiarmid =

Disappearance of Scottish-Australian woman

Sarah MacDiarmid
- Born: 15 November 1966
- Disappeared: 11 July 1990 (aged 23); Kananook railway station, Victoria, Australia
- Status: Missing for 36 years, 4 months and 4 days

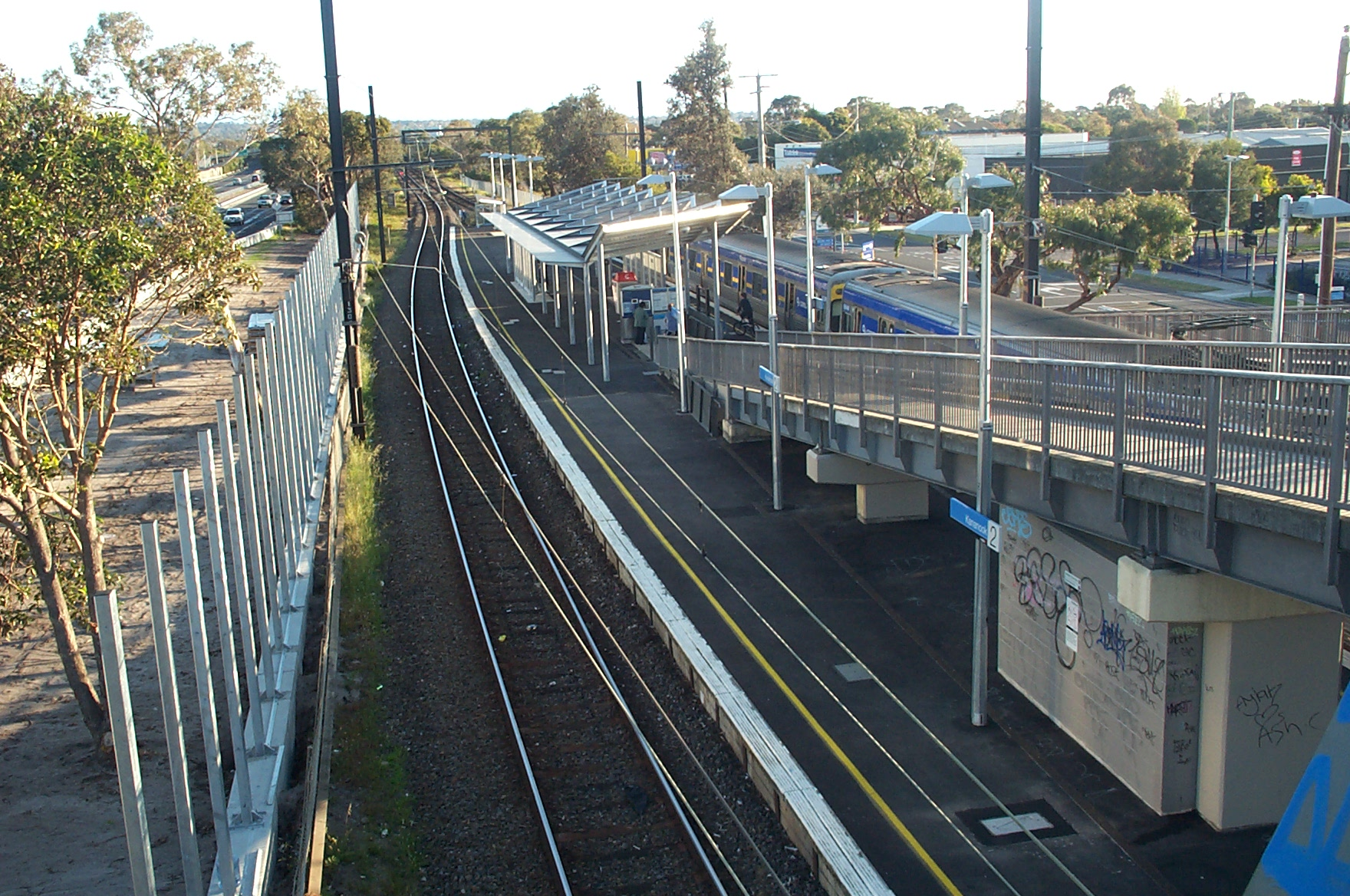
Kananook railway station where Sarah MacDiarmid disappeared on 11 July 1990

Sarah MacDiarmid (born 15 November 1966) was a 23-year-old Scottish-Australian woman who disappeared from Kananook railway station in Melbourne, Victoria, Australia on 11 July 1990. She is presumed murdered, although no trace of her body has ever been found.

== Disappearance ==
MacDiarmid, who emigrated with her family in 1987 from the Scottish Highlands to Australia, had been playing tennis after work with two friends at what was then known as Flinders Park in Batman Avenue, East Melbourne, before walking to Richmond station, where they found that they had just missed a Frankston line train. They caught a train to Caulfield, then changed to a Frankston service. MacDiarmid's friends disembarked this train at Bonbeach while she remained, continuing on to Kananook station where her vehicle was parked. She was last seen getting off the train and heading for the poorly lit car park at approximately 10:20 p.m. At around 11pm, MacDiarmid's family grew concerned when she hadn't arrived home yet. At 1am, MacDiarmid's brother, Alisdair, went to Kananook railway station to wait for the last train at 1:15 am; Sarah was not on the train. He found her car in the car park with the doors and boot locked.

== Investigation ==
Police suspected that MacDiarmid had been assaulted, based on bloodstains found beside her red 1978 Honda Civic abandoned in the station car park, and drag marks leading into the bushes. A cigarette lighter belonging to MacDiarmid was discovered on the ground, but no trace of her was ever found. Later, witnesses said MacDiarmid got off the train and crossed the footbridge to the car park, where some people heard a woman shouting, "Give me back my keys!". An extensive 21-day air, sea and land search, involving more than 250 police, produced no results.

In May 2006, an inquest held by coroner Ian West, found MacDiarmid "had met her death as a result of foul play but the exact circumstances were unknown".

An initial state government reward of $50,000 was increased after an additional $75,000 was offered by an anonymous benefactor. That was increased to $1 million in 2004 and remains current.

In 2011, convicted serial killer Paul Denyer was interviewed by police and denied any involvement in MacDiarmid's disappearance. Denyer stated to the interviewer, Detective Ron Iddles that he was "sick of being accused of murder", and later wrote to Iddles, thanking him for informing the public of him not being involved in the matter.

In May 2014, News Corp Australia claimed police investigators considered convicted serial killer Bandali Debs to be a suspect in the case. Fairfax Media quoted a "senior police source" who said "it was 'common practice' for homicide investigators to examine links between unsolved murders and known offenders". A Victoria Police spokesperson declined to comment to Fairfax Media as MacDiarmid's disappearance was an "active" case.

== Aftermath ==
The cold case was featured in the first episode of the Australian psychic TV series Sensing Murder, which aired on Network Ten in September 2004. The psychics used by this programme opined that MacDiarmid had been murdered and her body thrown into a now-closed rubbish dump on the Mornington Peninsula.

In 2010, marking the 20th anniversary of MacDiarmid's disappearance, her family and friends visited Kananook railway station to leave wreaths at a memorial established there. Her family also announced they had created a website Not Alone which was 'designed to help other families who find themselves in a position similar to them'. Police used the anniversary to issue a new call for information on the case with Victoria Police Assistant Commissioner Dannye Moloney stating:

You do not close the books on these sorts of crimes... History proves that if you continue to communicate with the people out there, in Victoria, in Australia, in the world in some cases, that piece of information, that key will come forward and we'll solve it.

In 2021, a nine part Australian crime podcast named Searching for Sarah Macdiarmid was released. Hosted and written by author Vikki Petraitis, the podcast focuses on the backstory of MacDiarmid, her disappearance, and the subsequent investigation.

== See also ==
- List of people who disappeared mysteriously (2000–present)
