= Nanette Ellis =

Australian murder victim (died 1984)

Nanette Mae Ellis Murder
- Location: Boronia, Melbourne, Victoria, Australia
- Date: 10 February 1984
- Attack type: Murder
- Weapon: Knife
- Deaths: 1
- Injuries: Stabbing
- Victim: Nanette Ellis
- Perpetrator: Unknown

Nanette Mae Ellis was a 41-year-old advertising manager who was murdered in her home on Manuka Drive, Boronia, Victoria on 10 February 1984. Despite extensive investigations, the case remains unsolved as of 2025.

== Personal life ==
Nanette Mae Ellis was a 41-year-old divorcee and single mother of two boys, at the time of her death. She lived at 39 Manuka Drive, Boronia Victoria Australia.

Nanette Ellis worked as an advertising manager for The Free Press in Belgrave, located in the Victorian Dandenong Ranges. The Free Press was part of the Leader Associated Newspapers in Blackburn. She had no known criminal associations and led a quiet routine life prior to the events leading up to her murder. She was well-regarded by her colleagues and community.

== Murder ==
=== Events leading up to her murder ===
On Tuesday 31 January 1984 after the long weekend, Nanette's car broke down outside the Burvale Hotel on the Burwood Highway. The radiator had boiled. She rang her sons to come and pick her up while the RACV was organised to tow her car to be repaired. She said she heard a bang somewhere up near where she left from Belgrave. A large rock was found wedged between the grill and the radiator that had put a hole in it. The radiator was then fixed.

The next day Wednesday 1 February a rock smashed through her windscreen while she was driving to work on Monbulk road.

The following day Thursday 2 February, Nanette's car again had rocks thrown at it on her way home from work. The rock landed on the roof of her car in the same spot as the day before.

On Friday 3 February on her way to work another rocked smashed her windscreen in the same area as the previous days. This time it came into her car and landed on the back seat. It was a large rock like the ones from the railway line opposite the incident.

On Saturday 4 February between 8pm and 10pm her car had paint poured over it in her Manuka Drive home that evening.

Then on Monday 6 February her car was again vandalised in her driveway at home. This time the number plate and radio aerial was ripped off, the windscreen wipers had been bent back, and her tyres were slashed - one was still hissing when Nanette discovered this damage. It was then that Nanette stockpiled weapons by the front door including an air rifle, golf club and wooden baton for protection, in case the prowlers came back- she was so scared.

The next couple of nights nothing else happened as she had police surveillance and friends stayed over to protect her. By this stage she was also getting police escorts to and from work.

=== Death ===
On the afternoon of Friday 10 February 1984, Nanette returned home from work at approximately 5:15 PM. A passerby saw her yellow 1982 Toyota Corolla sedan pull into the driveway of her Manuka Drive residence. Shortly after entering her home, Nanette was attacked and fatally stabbed multiple times by an unknown offender. Her 16-year-old son Greg discovered her body at the rear of the house when he returned home from the neighbours house just after 6pm.

== Investigation ==
The initial investigation was conducted by the Homicide Squad of Victoria Police. Despite numerous leads and extensive efforts, the case remained unsolved. Over the years, various detectives have reviewed the case, including Detective Senior Sergeant Stuart Bailey and Detective Inspector Dean Thomas. The case was then taken over by Detective Kyle Simpson.

Over the years, the Victoria Police have made several public appeals for information regarding the murder. On the 30th anniversary of Nanette's death, a $500,000 reward was announced, which is still in effect. Then on 10 February 2024, the 40th anniversary of Nanette's cold case murder. There were fresh appeals made via police and the media. The Department of Public Prosecutions has also stated that they would consider indemnification from prosecution for anyone involved who provides information leading to the arrest of the killer.

As of 2024, Detective Etherington is leading the investigation into the murder of Nanette Mae Ellis. The Victorian Police Homicide Squad continues to appeal for new information, hoping that advances in forensic technology and renewed public interest may help solve the case. A reward of $500,000 remains available for information leading to the prosecution of those responsible.

== Media coverage ==
The case has been covered extensively in the media, with renewed interest on significant anniversaries of the crime. Various news outlets have published articles seeking public assistance and highlighting the ongoing efforts of the Victoria Police to solve the case.
