= Tynong North and Frankston murders =

Unsolved murders in Australia

The Tynong North and Frankston Murders (alternatively, the Frankston and Tynong North Serial Killer) refers to the deaths of six girls and women who, in the period between May 1980 and October 1981, were taken, murdered, and dumped in remote scrub in the Tynong North and Frankston areas south-east of Melbourne, Australia. Later, the suburb of Frankston came to national attention again as a result of the Frankston serial killings in mid-1993. In 2017, increased rewards were offered for each of the cold cases.

== Frankston murders ==
The first known victim, Allison Rooke (59), disappeared on 30 May 1980, after experiencing trouble with her car. She had told neighbours she was taking a bus to Frankston Shopping Centre to go grocery shopping and see a realtor. The buses travelled along the Frankston-Dandenong Road, which was where Rooke was waiting when she disappeared. On Saturday 5 July, five weeks later, a man walking his dogs found Rooke’s naked body in a shallow grave, partially hidden by scrubland, on McClelland Drive in Frankston, and a $50,000 reward was soon posted by the police.

On Friday 9 October 1981, Frankston North resident Joy Summers (55), heading out for her weekly shopping trip, was waiting for a bus on Frankston-Dandenong Road around 1:20 pm when she also vanished. It was the same stretch of road where Rooke had been waiting when she disappeared. Summers' naked corpse was found in scrub by a man collecting firewood near the intersection of McClelland Drive and Skye Road, Frankston, six weeks later on Sunday 22 November.

== Tynong North murders ==
The skeletal remains of Bertha Miller (73), Catherine Headland (14), and Ann-Marie Sargent (18), were found on 6 December 1980 in a sand quarry by men dumping lamb offal on a secluded bush track leading from Brew Road, Tynong North. Miller was fully clothed, but the younger victims were both naked. Miller, a regular churchgoer, had disappeared on Sunday 10 August 1980 on her way to church, while heading to a tram-stop in Glen Iris. Headland (born 1965), an immigrant who had moved to Australia from England in 1966, lived in Berwick when she disappeared on Thursday 28 August while walking to a bus stop for the 11:20am bus to her part-time job at Coles in the Fountain Gate shopping complex. Sargent, unemployed, lived in Cranbourne, when she disappeared on 6 October after travelling from her mother's house to a nearby CES office in Dandenong to claim a benefits cheque.

On Thursday 3 February 1983, more human remains were found in the Tynong North scrubland, by a man who had stopped to repair a tyre, and a search of the area revealed concealed bones from a badly decomposed and stripped body. The bones were of Narumol Stephenson (34), a Thai mother-of-two who had married an Australian farmer in Thailand in 1978. Arriving in Australia in August 1979, they lived together in Deans Marsh. On a visit to Melbourne, Narumol disappeared from their car parked in Brunswick around dawn on 30 November 1980, following an argument with her husband.

== Investigation ==
Initially, the two investigations were treated separately, although the cases were later linked based on case and MO similarities. Similarities were also drawn to the recent Truro murders in South Australia. According to police at the time, all of the victims were on foot, with most of them planning to use public transport at the time they disappeared. A few may have tried to hitchhike. Given the lack of eyewitnesses to anything suspicious, authorities assumed that the victims probably knew or trusted their abductor. Causes of death could not be identified, and most bodies were stripped of possessions. Around 2000 interviews were held regarding the case, and later investigators speculated the possibility of two or three separate offenders.

The prime suspect in the case, Harold Janman, who "often offered women lifts on the Frankston-Dandenong Road", continued to maintain his innocence. Janman died aged 88 in August 2020. No one has been charged regarding the murders, which remain unsolved. In October 2017, the police announced six separate $1 million rewards (up from the original $50,000) for any information that resulted in an arrest in any of the cases.

== Timeline ==
- 30 May 1980 - Rooke disappears
- 5 July 1980 - Rooke's body found
- 10 August 1980 - Miller disappears
- 28 August 1980 - Headland disappears
- 6 October 1980 - Sargent disappears
- 30 November 1980 - Stephenson disappears
- 6 December 1980 - Miller's, Headland's, and Sargent's bodies found
- 9 October 1981 - Summers disappears
- 22 November 1981 - Summers' body found
- 3 December 1981 - Janman first interviewed (no other cases after this date)
- 3 February 1983 - Stephenson's body found

== See also ==
- Crime in Australia
- List of fugitives from justice who disappeared
- Timeline of major crimes in Australia
- Truro murders
