= Murder of Michele Brown =

Unsolved murder

- Date: March 1992
- Location: Frankston, Victoria
- Cause: Undetermined
- Deaths: Michele Brown

Michele Brown was a 25 year old woman who was found deceased behind a gun shop in Frankston on 14 March 1992. Her cause of death has not been determined, however she is presumed to have been murdered. There is a A$1 million reward for information leading to the arrest of her killer.

== Background ==
Brown had participated in sports as she grew up and had played netball. However, an injury prevented her from playing sport further, causing her to drift away from her friends in sport and instead associate with people involved in criminal activity. Her sister, then a new police officer stationed in Frankston, was aware of the individuals Brown associated with.

== Investigation ==
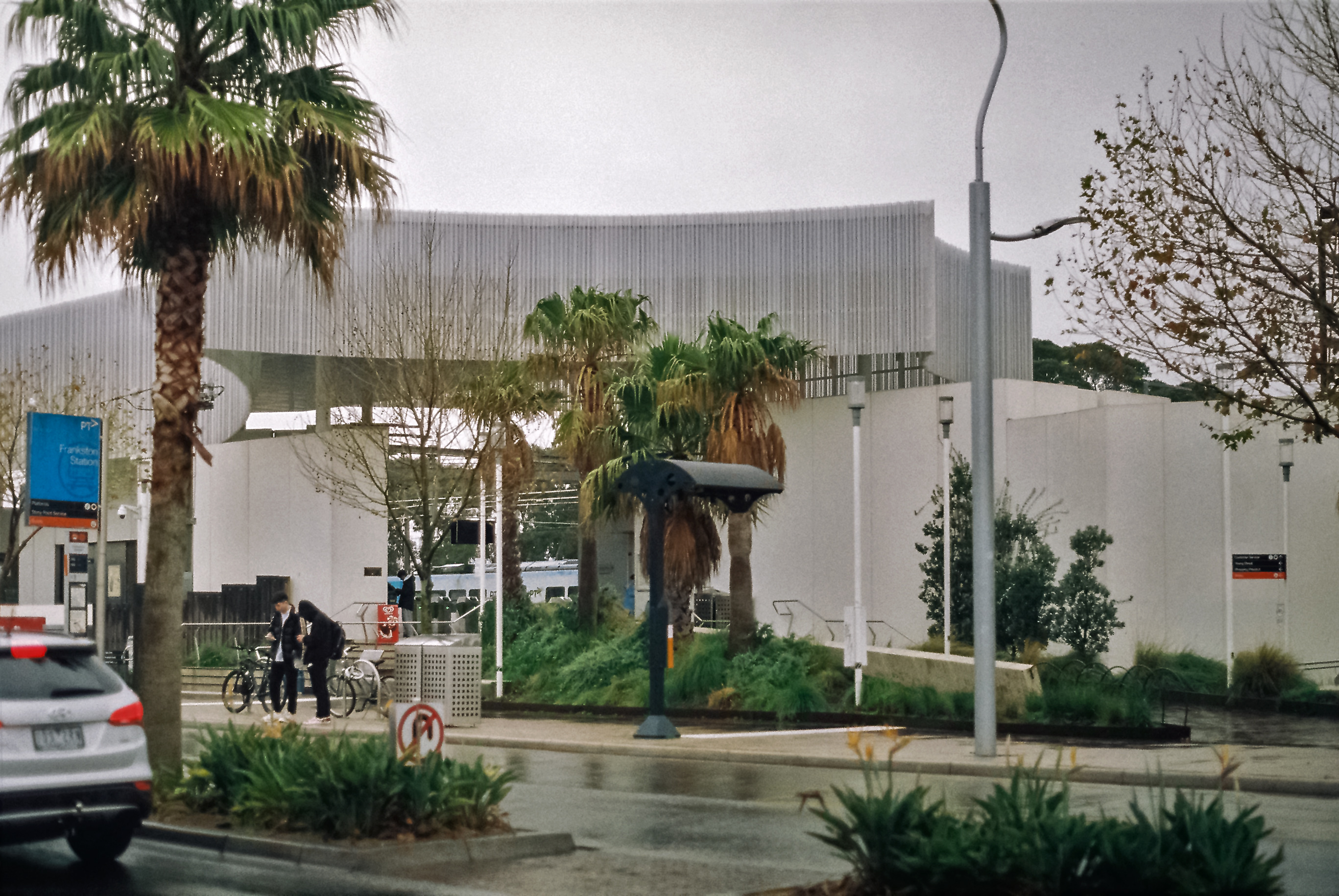
Frankston railway station: 300 metres from where Brown's body was discovered

Brown disappeared on 1 March 1992, after calling her mother to collect her from Frankston Railway Station. How Brown got to the location in which she was found is unknown. She had made the phone call at a shop on Frankston-Dandenong Road, several kilometres away. She had informed her family she expected to be at the station by 8:00 p.m., leading police to believe she had either walked to Kananook railway station and caught the train to Frankston, or she had hitch-hiked or been driven there. A taxi driver told investigators he saw someone fitting the description of Brown near phone boxes at Frankston railway station between 8:00 p.m. and 9:00 p.m. Screams were heard soon after this by a resident in the same street as the location Brown was later found.

Brown's mother was concerned after her daughter was not at the Frankston railway station as promised, and some days later reported her missing to police. Her body was discovered behind the gun shop a day later by an employee after they noticed a smell coming from a shed. Brown was found naked and face down with her clothes beside her body.

Due to the decomposition, the cause of death was not determined however, she was presumed to have been murdered. Investigators later discovered she had been to this specific shed previously to use drugs, leading police to believe someone she knew was responsible for her death. Investigators also believe that more than one person knows how Brown died.

In 2022, 30 years after Brown's death, the police offered a reward of $1million for information leading to the arrest of Brown's killer.
