= Augusto Ramírez =

Augusto Ramírez may refer to:

- Augusto Ramírez Monasterio (1937–1983), beatified Guatemalan Catholic priest
- Augusto Ramírez Ocampo (1934–2011), Colombian politician
- Augusto Ramírez Olivares (born 1873), Chilean newspaperman
