= Assassinated Catholic priests in Guatemala =

List of assassinated and forcibly disappeared Roman Catholic priests working in Guatemala.

Name	Nationality	Parish	Date killed	Notes
William Woods, MM	American	Maryknoll mission Ixcán	20 November 1976	Included in death list of the Guatemalan military. Killed in plane crash under suspicious circumstances.
Eufemio Hermógenes López Coarchita	Guatemalan	Parish priest of San José Pinula	30 June 1978	Assassinated
Conrado de la Cruz Concepción	Filipino	Parish priest of Tiquisate	1 May 1980	Abducted and disappeared
Walter Voordeckers, CICM	Belgian	Parish priest of Santa Lucía Cotzumalguapa	12 May 1980	Assassinated
José María Gran Cirera, MSC	Spanish	Parish priest of Chajul	4 June 1980	Assassinated
Faustino Villanueva Villanueva, MSC	Spanish	Parish priest of Joyabaj	10 July 1980	Assassinated
Juan Alonso Fernández, MSC	Spanish	Parish priest of Uspantán	15 February 1981	Assassinated
Carlos Gálvez Galindo	Guatemalan	Parish priest of Tecpán	14 May 1981	Assassinated
Tullio Marcello Maruzzo, OFM	Italian	Diocesan priest of Izabal	1 July 1981	Assassinated
Stanley Francis Rother	American	Parish priest of Santiago Atitlán	28 July 1981	Assassinated
Carlos Pérez Alonso, SJ	Spanish	Hospital chaplain	2 August 1981	Abducted and disappeared
Carlos Ramiro Morales López, OP	Guatemalan	Parish priest of Rabinal	21 January 1982	Assassinated
James Alfred Miller, FSC	American	Teacher in Huehuetenango	13 February 1982	Assassinated
Augusto Rafael Ramírez Monasterio, OFM	Guatemalan	Parish priest of Antigua Guatemala	7 November 1983	Abducted and assassinated.
