= Lists of solved missing person cases =

Lists of solved missing person cases include:

- List of solved missing person cases (pre-1950)
- List of solved missing person cases (1950–1969)
- List of solved missing person cases (1970s)
- List of solved missing person cases (1980s)
- List of solved missing person cases (1990s)
- List of solved missing person cases (2000s)
- List of solved missing person cases (2010s)
- List of solved missing person cases (2020s)

== See also ==
- List of kidnappings
- List of murder convictions without a body
- List of people who disappeared mysteriously (pre-1910)
- List of people who disappeared mysteriously (1910–1970)
- List of people who disappeared mysteriously (1970s)
- List of people who disappeared mysteriously (1980s)
- List of people who disappeared mysteriously (1990s)
- List of people who disappeared mysteriously (2000–present)
- List of unsolved deaths
- Lists of unsolved murders
