= List of unsolved murders in Belize =

This is a list of noted unsolved murders in Belize since the 1970s. This list includes both known and presumed murders, and further includes murders which were previously unsolved (that is, solved cold murder cases). (Note: This article relies mainly on press coverage, so may miss unsolved murders which did not gain notoriety. See also List of police killings in Belize. Victims known or presumed to have been murdered by the same perpetrator(s) are grouped together. Notes and short citations provided in Cf columns. Short citations in the form Am yy refer to Amandala, review for yyyy (or for split reviews, Am yyi refer to review's first part, Am yyii refer to second part, and so on).) In 2019–2023, the country saw 134, 102, 125, 113, and 87 murders, with 51, 55, 44, 40, and 47 arrests for the same (arrest rates of 38.1, 53.9, 35.2, 35.4, and 54.0 per cent), respectively. (Note: Annual Comparative 2022–2023 (Report). Belmopan, Belize: BCO. 4 January 2024.; Crime Observatory 2023b; Crime Observatory 2022c; Annual Comparative 2019–2020 (Report). Belmopan, Belize: BCO. 5 January 2021. 2021 arrest tally given as 46 in Crime Observatory 2022c but revised to 44 in Crime Observatory 2023b. In July 2022, the Commissioner of Police (Chester Williams) noted the arrest rate was particularly low in Belize City, where murders (mostly gang or drug related) most often occurred, claiming witnesses there were especially hard to come by (per "Arrest rate gone up". 7 News. Belize City. 6 July 2022.).) As of July 2025, the tally of cold murder cases had not been reported, though authorities last reported a review in July 2024. (Note: "ComPol crafted specialized team for cold cases". 7 News. Belize City. 29 July 2024. In September 2022, the Forensic Service director (Gian Cho) claimed 'the oldest cold cases in Belize's history may date back to 1990 or 1991' (7 News 2022a).)

== 21st century ==
Date	Victim(s) (age)	District (place)	Description	Cf
1 May 2025	Carlos Avelar (61)	Belize (Belize)	A mechanic was shot and killed by two gunmen whilst walking on Coney Drive.	
29 Mar 2025	Elvis Aldana (34)	Belize (Belize)	A man was shot and killed by a lone gunman whilst socialising at a residence on Electric Avenue and McKay Boulevard.	
21 Feb 2025	Boris Mannsfeld (56)	Stann Creek (Seine Bight)	An American real estate developer was shot and killed in front of his resort and residence, Cocoplum Villas on Maya Beach. In a January 2025 email, Mannsfeld had allegedly referenced a 'massive fraud case' involving millions in stolen assets.	(Note: Love News 2025a; Breaking Belize News 2025b. Possible link to D Taylor and R Borja murders (Love News 2025a; Breaking Belize News 2025b).)
8 Sep 2024	Belhem Guzman Sr (58)	Cayo (Camalote)	The lifeless body of a disabled senior was found on 8 September off a highway, bound with a power cord and with apparent knife wounds to the neck.	
6 Jun 2024	Alfredo Rodriguez (42)	Belize (Belize)	A man was shot and killed by a lone gunman whilst fishing near Port of Belize.	
28 May 2024	Solomon Coleman (36)	Cayo (Belmopan)	A Punta Gorda, Toledo resident was shot and killed by a masked gunman on Cemetery Road.	
13 Apr 2024	Darren Taylor (43)	Stann Creek (Dangriga)	A businessman was shot and killed by a lone gunman at his residence on Oak Street.	
23 Jan 2024	Margaret Cleland (30)	Belize (Willows Bank)	The lifeless body of a mother of one was found in the bush near her residence, with apparent blunt force trauma.	
15 Dec 2023	Leslie Young Jr (19)	Belize (Belize)	A teenager was shot and killed near the Mexican Cultural Institute by a lone gunman after leaving a Newtown Barracks bar.	
20 Aug 2023	Nigel Ferguson Jr (15)	Belize (Belize)	The lifeless body of a special needs teenager was found on 20 August on Hunter's Lane, stabbed to death.	
19 Aug 2023	Ricardo Borja (28)	Belize (Belize)	A businessman was shot and killed outside his apartment on Coney Drive. He had recently met with police to testify regarding a land scam in Placencia, Stann Creek, allegedly implicating various Ministry of Natural Resources staff.	(Note: Am 23ii; "Investigation of businessman Ricardo Borja's murder deepens". Amandala. Belize City. 2 September 2023.)
14 May 2023	Imarie Galvez (19)	Cayo (Belmopan)	The lifeless body of a teenager was found on 16 May near Mile 40 of Hummingbird Highway, with apparent blunt force trauma and a gunshot wound to her head.	
1 Apr 2023	Wellington Williams (16)	Belize (Belize)	A secondary student was shot and killed by two gunmen on CA Boulevard (near Port of Belize) whilst delivering food for his aunt's fast food restaurant.	
2 Mar 2023	Brian Perez (38)	Belize (Belize)	A BEL employee and father of five was shot and killed by two home invaders whilst trying to protect his family at their residence on Gill Street.	
31 Oct 2022	Celia Florian (30)	Cayo (Belmopan)	The lifeless body of a waitress was found off Hummingbird Highway on 4 November, strangled to death.	
15 Sep 2021	James Gordon (49)	Belize (Belize)	A former basketball player, father of three, and alleged loan shark was shot to death at a residence on Meighan Avenue whilst apparently collecting on a debt.	
24 Jul 2021	Armando Coy Cacao (50)	Cayo (Belmopan)	The lifeless body of a Guatemalan national (of Bethel Street) was found on Guyana Street in San Martin, with apparent stab wounds. Joseph Budna (a freelancer) was charged for abetment to murder in July 2024.	(Note: Am 24ii; "Budna charged with abetment to murder". News 5. Belize City. 26 July 2024. Primary suspect 'had been killed in Honduras' per ComPol (Chester Williams), but name was not publicly shared (Am 24ii).)
24 Jan 2020	Ernesto Williams (44)	Belize (Belize)	A businessman (owner of Sky Deck, a popular bar on Baymen Avenue) was shot and killed by a lone gunman as he headed to his parked vehicle on Orange Street and Pregnant Alley.	
18 Jun 2019	Travis Cooke (23), Ernest Wills Sr (49), Winston Santos (40), Allyson Jones (19), Jamar Martinez (21)	Belize (Belize)	The lifeless bodies of five fishermen were found on 20–22 June near Swallow Caye, Yarborough, and Mapp Caye, all shot and killed, after they had embarked on a fishing trip on 18 June. Police suggested they had come across a wet drop (drug parcel at sea).	(Note: News 5 2019f; Amandala 2019j. Martinez aged 21 in News 5 2019f but 23 in Amandala 2019j.)
5 Apr 2019	Oswald Warrior (22)	Belize (Belize)	A Carmelita, Orange Walk man was shot whilst on Sarstoon Street on 5 April, and died of his wounds on 17 April.	
26 Jan 2019	Michael Williams (58)	Belize (Belize)	A businessman (son of Marie Sharp) was shot dead by two gunmen as he parked on North Front Street.	
3 Dec 2018	Francis Gill (48)	Belize (Belize)	An amputee, disabilities advocate, and father of three was shot and killed whilst exiting his vehicle on Barracuda Street in Coral Grove, after a night out at Princess Casino.	
13 Apr 2018	Mark Seawell (48), Gabriel Escalante (42)	Belize (Caye Lagos)	Two Ladyville, Belize tradesmen were shot to death at their workplace.	
21 Nov 2017	Clinton Davis (53)	Belize (Belize)	The decomposing body of a real estate agent was found on 24 November near his family residence on Mile 5 of George Price Highway, with a stick lodged in his throat.	
27 Oct 2017	Odner Estiverne (40)	Belize (Belize)	A Haitian cabbie and father of two (of Nutmeg Street) was shot and killed by a lone gunman whilst driving his dollar van near Complex Avenue and Jones Street.	
1 May 2017	Francesca Matus (52), Drew DeVoursney (36)	Corozal (Chan Chen)	The lifeless bodies of a Canadian–American couple were found in a sugarcane field on 1 May, strangled to death. They had last been seen on 25 April, leaving Scottie's Bar in Corozal, Corozal.	
19 Feb 2017	Walter Dawson (57)	Belize (Ladyville)	The lifeless body of a man was found butchered on Marage Road, his neck nearly severed.	
15 Jan 2016	Anne Swaney (39)	Cayo (Succotz)	The lifeless body of an ABC7 Chicago producer was found on 15 January in the Mopan River near Nabitunich Farm, where she was holidaying. She had been strangled to death, per the autopsy.	
29 Oct 2013	Patricia Nichiporowich (57)	Corozal (Consejo)	The lifeless body of a Canadian national was found in her residence on 29 October, with multiple stab wounds.	
22 Jan 2013	Majdi Khoder Agha (51)	Belize (Belize)	A Lebanese businessman and father of five was shot and killed by a masked gunman before his family residence on Keating Crescent in Buttonwood Bay.	
7 Jan 2013	Keino Quallo (40), Albert Fuentes (19), Anthony Perez (28), Leonard Myers (30)	Belize (Belize)	The lifeless bodies of four alleged George Street gangmembers were discovered in their upper flat on Dean and Plues Streets on 8 January, with apparent stab wounds. Family, friends, and neighbours accused the GSU (Marco Vidal commander then) of committing or facilitating the murders, but police suggested gang rivalries.	
11 Nov 2012	Gregory Faull (52)	Belize (San Pedro)	An American expat was found shot and killed in his residence on 11 November in northern Ambergris Caye. His neighbour and a primary person of interest (John McAfee) fled before questioning, and died on 23 June 2021 in a Spanish jail of apparent suicide.	(Note: News 5 2021e; "One year after Gregory Faull's death police remain clueless". San Pedro Sun. San Pedro, Belize. 12 November 2013. A Florida court found McAfee civilly liable for Faull's death (News 5 2021e).)
24 Oct 2012	Alfred Schakron (51)	Belize (Belize)	A Lebanese businessman and father of two was shot dead in front of Body 2000 Gym on Coney Drive.	
22 Oct 2012	Abdul Aziz Mohamed Dib (40)	Belize (Belize)	A Lebanese businessman was shot and killed by a lone gunman whilst having lunch at King Kebab Restaurant in Farmer's Market.	
30 Jan 2010	Lorenzo Ho Sr (49)	Cayo (Roaring Creek)	A father was found dead in his residence, with his face bloodied. Police did not suspect foul play, though family noted 'Ho had apparently been badly beaten.'	
11 Sep 2001	Clint Geban (31)	Belize (Belize)	A man was shot on 11 September by a lone gunman as he stood on Plues and South Street, and died the day after of his wounds. Kenroy Tillet was charged for the murder in February 2006.	

== 20th century ==
Date	Victim(s) (age)	District (place)	Description	Cf
8 Oct 1998	Sherilee Nicholas (13), Jackie Malic (12), Jay Blades (9), Erica Wills (9), Naomi Hernandez (14)	Belize (Belize)	Five primary school girls were tortured and stabbed to death during October 1998 to February 2000 by the Belize Ripper.	(Note: 7 News 2022a; News 5 2016a; News 5 2023c; "Missing girl found stabbed to death". New 5. Belize City. 9 October 1998. Deemed first serial killings and 'greatest unsolved mystery' in country (7 News 2022a; News 5 2016a). Samantha Gordon and Rebecca Gilharry deemed victims by 7 News 2022a but not by News 5 2016a. Hernandez named Noemi in 7 News 2022a and Naomi in News 5 2016a.)
6 Jul 1978	Christopher Farmer (25), Peta Frampton (24)	Toledo	The decomposed bodies of a British couple were found on 6 July near Punta de Manabique, Guatemala (some 15 miles southeast of Punta Gorda, Toledo), after having sailed from Dangriga, Stann Creek on 26 June. Their tour guide (Silas Boston) was charged with their murder by US authorities in 2016.	

== See also ==
- Lists of unsolved murders

== Notes and references ==
=== References ===
1. Annual Comparative 2021–2022 (Report). Belmopan, Belize: BCO. 4 January 2023.
2. Annual Comparative 2020–2021 (Report). Belmopan, Belize: BCO. 3 January 2022.
3. "Year in review". Amandala. Belize City. 2004–2024.
4. "NFSS launches cold case unit - Could 'Jack' killings be solved?". 7 News. Belize City. 1 September 2022.
5. "Revisiting greatest unsolved murder mystery – 'Belizean Jack the Ripper'". News 5. Belize City. 30 December 2016.
6. "Unsolved mystery: No breakthrough in investigation of Boris Mannsfeld's murder amidst real estate deal scrutiny". Love News. Belize City. 26 February 2025.
7. "Boris Mannsfeld murdered in Maya Beach: Police investigate possible links to previous killings". BBN. San Ignacio, Belize. 22 February 2025.
8. "Unsolved murders, cold cases – Families' hopes dashed in the absence of arrests". News 5. Belize City. 3 October 2023.
9. "John McAfee dead: Cold case in Belize remains". News 5. Belize City. 23 June 2021.
10. "Quintuple murder at sea; was it drug related?". News 5. Belize City. 24 June 2019.
11. "Floating bodies everywhere!". Amandala. Belize City. 26 June 2019.
12. "Another Lebanese executed – 3rd in 3 months". Amandala. Belize City. 25 January 2013.
