= Lists of murders =

Following are lists of murders organized in various ways. Entries may appear in more than one section.

== By location ==
- List of assassinations, sorted by continent and country
- List of assassinations in Africa
- List of assassinations in Asia
- List of assassinations in Europe
- List of familicides in Europe
- List of journalists killed in Europe
- List of massacres in Afghanistan
- List of massacres in Albania
- List of massacres in Algeria
- List of massacres in Argentina
- List of massacres in Australia
  - List of massacres of Indigenous Australians
- List of unsolved murders in Australia
- List of massacres in Azerbaijan
- List of massacres in Bangladesh
- List of journalists killed in Bangladesh
- List of massacres in Belarus
- List of massacres in Belgium
- List of unsolved murders in Belize
- List of massacres in Brazil
- List of massacres in Bulgaria
- List of massacres in Burundi
- List of massacres in Canada
- List of unsolved murders in Canada
- List of massacres in Chile
- List of massacres in China
- List of massacres in Colombia
- List of massacres in Cyprus
- List of massacres in the Czech Republic
- List of massacres in the Dominican Republic
- List of massacres in East Timor
- List of massacres in Egypt
- List of massacres in El Salvador
- List of massacres in Finland
- List of massacres in France
- List of massacres in Germany
- List of massacres in Great Britain
- List of massacres in Greece
- List of massacres in Guatemala
- Assassinated Catholic priests in Guatemala
- List of journalists killed in Guatemala
- List of massacres in Guyana
- List of massacres in Haiti
- List of journalists killed in Honduras
- List of massacres in Hungary
- List of massacres in India
- List of journalists killed in India
  - List of journalists killed in Assam, a state in India
- List of massacres in Indonesia
- List of massacres in Iraq
- List of massacres in Ireland
- List of massacres in ancient Israel
- List of massacres in Israel
- List of massacres in Italy
- List of massacres in Jamaica
- List of massacres in Japan
- List of massacres in Kenya
- List of massacres in Latvia
- List of massacres in Lebanon
- List of massacres in Libya
- List of massacres in Lithuania
- List of massacres in Macedonia
- List of massacres in Malaysia
- List of killings and massacres in Mandatory Palestine
- List of massacres in Mexico
- List of journalists and media workers killed in Mexico
- List of massacres in Myanmar, aka Burma
- List of massacres in Nepal
- List of massacres in New Zealand
- List of massacres in Nigeria
- List of massacres in North Korea
- List of massacres in Ottoman Syria and Lebanon
- List of massacres in the Palestinian territories
- List of massacres in Palestine
- List of massacres in Peru
- List of massacres in the Philippines
- List of journalists killed under the Arroyo administration in the Philippines
- List of massacres in Poland
- List of massacres in Romania
- List of massacres in Russia
- List of journalists killed in Russia
- List of massacres in Rwanda
- List of massacres in São Tomé and Príncipe
- List of massacres in Serbia
- List of massacres in Singapore
- List of massacres in Slovakia
- List of massacres in Slovenia
- List of massacres in the Solomon Islands
- List of massacres in South Africa
- Political assassinations in post-apartheid South Africa
- List of massacres in South Korea
- List of massacres in the Soviet Union
- List of massacres in Spain
- List of massacres in Sri Lanka
- List of massacres in Sudan
- List of massacres in Syria
- List of massacres in Taiwan
- List of journalists killed in Tajikistan
- List of massacres in Thailand
- List of massacres in Turkey
- List of journalists killed in Turkey
- List of massacres in Ukraine
- List of unsolved murders in the United Kingdom
- List of massacres in the United States
- List of journalists killed in the United States
- List of 2012 murders in the United States
- List of massacres in Venezuela
- List of massacres in Vietnam
- List of massacres in Yugoslavia

== By nationality of victim ==
- List of murdered American children
- List of assassinated American politicians
- List of assassinated Indian politicians
- List of assassinated Lebanese politicians
- List of assassinated people from Turkey
- List of British police officers killed in the line of duty
- List of Gardaí killed in the line of duty (Republic of Ireland)
- List of Malaysian police officers killed in the line of duty
- List of New Zealand police officers killed in the line of duty
- List of Singapore police officers killed in the line of duty
- List of law enforcement officers killed in the line of duty in the United States
- List of Turkish diplomats assassinated by Armenian militant organisations

== Political and state-sanctioned murders ==
- List of assassinated American politicians
- List of assassinated Indian politicians
- List of Iranian assassinations
- List of Israeli assassinations
- List of people assassinated by the Janatha Vimukthi Peramuna, a Sri Lankan communist party
- List of assassinations of the Second JVP Insurrection (Sri Lanka), attributed to both the Janatha Vimukthi Peramuna and government forces
- List of Soviet and Russian assassinations (disambiguation)
- List of people assassinated by the Liberation Tigers of Tamil Eelam (Sri Lanka)
- List of people killed by Sri Lankan government forces
- Political assassinations in post-apartheid South Africa
- List of Turkish diplomats assassinated by Armenian militant organisations
- List of assassinated human rights activists, including political dissidents

== By war ==
- List of massacres in the Bosnian War
- List of massacres in the Croatian War of Independence
- List of assassinations of the Iraq War
- List of Second Chechen War assassinations
- List of assassinations of the Sri Lankan Civil War

== By office ==
- List of murdered popes
- List of United States presidential assassination attempts and plots, including the four successful assassinations
- List of members of the United States Congress killed or wounded in office
- List of United States federal judges killed in office

== By occupation ==
These lists may include accidental deaths.
Ordered by occupation.

- List of Turkish diplomats assassinated by Armenian militant organisations
- List of journalists killed in Bangladesh
- List of journalists killed in Europe
- List of journalists killed in Guatemala
- List of journalists killed in Honduras
- List of journalists killed in India
  - List of journalists killed in Assam, a state in India
- List of journalists and media workers killed in Mexico
- List of journalists killed under the Arroyo administration in the Philippines
- List of journalists killed in Russia
- List of journalists killed in Tajikistan
- List of journalists killed in Turkey
- List of journalists killed in the United States
- List of murdered cricketers
- List of murdered musicians
  - List of murdered hip hop musicians
- List of British police officers killed in the line of duty
- List of Gardaí killed in the line of duty (Republic of Ireland)
- List of Malaysian police officers killed in the line of duty
- List of New Zealand police officers killed in the line of duty
- List of Singapore police officers killed in the line of duty
- List of law enforcement officers killed in the line of duty in the United States
- List of assassinated American politicians
- List of assassinated Indian politicians
- Assassinated Catholic priests in Guatemala

== By type of victim ==
- List of murdered American children
- List of familicides, in which at least half of the victims were relatives of the perpetrator or the perpetrator's spouse. Cases with more than one offender are not included.
- List of rampage killers (familicides in Europe)
- List of regicides
- List of massacres of Indigenous Australians
- List of patricides
- List of people killed for being transgender

== By method ==
- List of axe murders
- List of lynching victims in the United States
- List of mass car bombings, restricted to those which resulted in at least two deaths

== Unsolved murders ==
- List of unsolved murders (before 1900)
- List of unsolved murders (1900–1979)
- List of unsolved murders (1980–1999)
- List of unsolved murders (2000–present)
- List of unsolved murders in Australia
- List of unsolved murders in Belize
- List of unsolved murders in Canada
- List of unsolved murders in the United Kingdom

== Other ==
- List of postal killings, murders which occurred on post office property or were post office-related

== See also ==
- Killings and massacres during the 1948 Palestine war
- Lists of murderers
- List of unsolved deaths
