= List of unsolved killings in the United Kingdom (2010–present) =

This is an incomplete list of unsolved killings in the United Kingdom that have been committed in and after 2010.

Murder victims believed to have been killed by the same perpetrator(s) are grouped together below.

== 2010s ==
=== 2010 ===
Year	Victim(s)	Location of body or bodies	Notes
January 2010	Antoine Denis	Chatham, Kent	66-year-old Denis was found dead at his flat in Copperfield House, New Road, Chatham, on 9 January 2010. Murder was not suspected until a knife in his back was discovered when his body was about to be moved by undertakers. A woman was charged with Denis's murder, but the charge was dropped in March 2010.
January 2010	Sukhwinder Singh	Attacked in Barking, London, died in hospital	31-year-old Singh was stabbed in the heart in Uphall Road after chasing two men who robbed a woman of her handbag and mobile phone in nearby Loxford Road. He died in hospital the following day, 9 January.
January 2010	Angel of the Meadow	Angel Meadow, Manchester	The skeletal remains of a woman were discovered wrapped in a carpet in Angel Meadow, Manchester, on 25 January 2010. A post-mortem revealed that she suffered a fractured jaw, nose, neck and clavicle prior to her death. Investigators believed that the Caucasian decedent was aged 16 to 30, and that her murder occurred between 1975 and 1988.
January 2010	Mohamed Abdul Kadir	Liverpool	19-year-old Kadir died in hospital three days after suffering a head injury during a street attack in Toxteth on 26 January. A local person was withholding information that would help find the killer(s), police believed.
March 2010	Donavan Van Lill	Body not found	Van Lill, a 29-year-old fitness instructor who lived and worked in the Wiltshire town of Chippenham, went missing on 3 March 2010. A 41-year-old swimming instructor who worked with him at a leisure centre was charged with his murder later that month. It was alleged at trial that he began plotting to kill Van Lill after they fell out whilst on holiday in Van Lill's native South Africa in 2006, with the prosecution drawing attention to a list found at the defendant's home of methods to kill and ways to get rid of evidence following a killing – a list he maintained was just fantasy and contained nothing he intended to put into practice. The defence in turn drew attention to the failure of forensic scientists to link him to Van Lill's disappearance, and after more than 12 hours of deliberation, the jury cleared him.
March 2010	Nigel Price	Southampton	58-year-old Price lapsed into a semi-coma following a beating on Southampton Common on 13/14 November 2009, and died on 23 March 2010. Police were not sure whether the attack was homophobic.
April 2010	Errol McKenzie	Leyton, London	McKenzie, 37, was shot on 11 April 2010 in a playing field off Seymour Road after returning to Leyton from a work-related visit to Tottenham. Police did not establish a motive.
April 2010	Niamh and Cayden Adams	Buxton, Derbyshire	Five-year-old Niamh and two-year-old Cayden died in a house fire at night on 23 April 2010. Police suspected the fire was started by their mother, who escaped by jumping from an upstairs window with her third child, and she was charged. She was later cleared at Nottingham Crown Court of causing the children's deaths, as well as arson and inflicting grievous bodily harm. After the verdicts, Derbyshire Constabulary said it would set up an independent review team.
April 2010	Barry Rubery	Iron Acton, near Bristol	Rubery, a grandfather aged 68, was restrained with cable ties and beaten to death at his cottage in Iron Acton on 28 April 2010. Various items were stolen from the cottage too, including a gold Masonic pocket watch, a Makita drill and a Nokia 3310 mobile phone.
April 2010	Nicky Ayers	Liverpool	Ayers, a 46-year-old who managed a football team called Western Approaches, was shot in South Cantril Avenue, West Derby, on 29 April 2010. He was known to the police and had been in prison for his part in a plot to supply the drug MDMA in Jersey. It has been claimed that Ayers's murder and that of Karl Bradley in March 2013 were ordered by the same drug boss.
May 2010	Daniel Smith	Maida Vale, London	Smith, a 22-year-old electrician, was shot as he left a takeaway on London's Harrow Road on 22 May 2010. The killing was thought to have been a case of mistaken identity. Two years later a jury cleared three people of Smith's murder.
June 2010	James Davis	Norwich, Norfolk	The 25-year-old care worker was stabbed in the heart, thigh and buttocks on 3 June 2010 after travelling from London to Norwich with three other people to take property from one of the occupants of a house on Old Palace Road. Seven people have been arrested but nobody has been charged in connection with the fatal attack.
June 2010	Paul Pike	Liverpool	Pike, 23, was killed and his girlfriend suffered minor injuries when his van was hit by bullets after stopping at traffic lights on Crosby Road North, Waterloo, on 5 June 2010. No motive for the shooting is known.
July 2010	Wayne Powell	Attacked in Chingford, London, died in hospital	Powell, a 39-year-old DJ, was shot four times after getting out of his car in Higham Station Avenue on 5 July 2010. The gunman walked away calmly following the shooting.
September 2010	Ricardo Cunha	West Norwood, London	23-year-old Cunha heard a knock on the front door of his block of flats after sitting down to watch TV with his girlfriend on 11 September 2010, and leaned out of a window to investigate. A bullet fired by someone outside then hit him in the head and killed him, but police believe it was meant for another person.
September 2010	Imran Farooq	Edgware, London	Farooq died outside his home in Green Lane, Edgware, north London, on 16 September from multiple stab wounds and head injuries. The 50-year-old exile was a high-ranking member of the Muttahida Qaumi Movement, a political group with its origins in his native Pakistan as an opposition party, and his murder was believed to have been politically motivated.
September 2010	Colin Hughes	Liverpool	Hughes, a 42-year-old chef, was stabbed in the chest in the garden of his Old Swan home on 21 September 2010 after going outside to investigate because the back door glass had been smashed. A man seen in a nearby alley shortly before the nighttime incident has not been traced and was described as being slim, white, and about 5 feet 10 inches (1.78 m) tall.
19 October 2010	Edith Stuart	Attacked in Cleveleys, died in hospital in Blackpool (both in Lancashire)	Stuart, 96, died in Blackpool Victoria Hospital the day after the care home bed in which she was sleeping was set on fire.
October 2010	Samuel Adelagun	Plaistow, London	Two men shot at 16-year-old Adelagun's group at the junction of Chesterton Road and Upper Road, Plaistow, on 23 October 2010. Adelagun was hit in the chest and died, while a companion was hit in the abdomen and survived.
November 2010	Andrew Crawford	Leeds	44-year-old Crawford was involved in an argument after a Motörhead concert in Leeds on 25 November 2010. Crawford and his cousin were punched to the ground during the argument and Crawford died the following day from blunt force trauma injuries to the head. An inquest the following year found that no one was likely to be charged over his death as it could not be known who had struck the fatal blow.
December 2010	Wayne Bassnett	Attacked in Hale, Cheshire, died in hospital	30-year-old Bassnett was shot dead on 22 December 2010, and a man was acquitted of the act in March 2013. Police believe another man to have been involved in the shooting in some way, but his whereabouts are unknown. Bassnett had been arrested over the January 2002 disappearance of Lyndon Nowell.

=== 2011 ===
Year	Victim(s)	Location of body or bodies	Notes
January 2011	Eddie Pybis	Liverpool	20-year-old Pybis was shot on 3 January 2011 whilst in the passenger seat of a Volvo being driven through Anfield. He is believed to have also been the front seat passenger of a silver Ford Focus when there was an altercation in Larkhill Close involving the people in the Focus and another car earlier in the day.
January 2011	Adrian Milner	Attacked in Sittingbourne, Kent, died in hospital in London	48-year-old Milner, a father-of-two, was punched as he walked along Church Road, Murston, Sittingbourne, just before 8:00 p.m. on 28 December 2010. The attack was unprovoked; Milner hit his head on the pavement and died in hospital 12 days later.
January 2011	Lana Purcell	Body not found	26-year-old Purcell, a mother of a six-year-old daughter, lived in Queen's Crescent, Kentish Town, north London, and vanished on 17 January 2011. A link between her disappearance and that of 37-year-old Robert Duff, who went missing from another area of north London two years later, has been suggested but is not officially accepted. Purcell and Duff had mutual acquaintances and are both presumed murdered.
January 2011	Joseph Cummins	Liverpool	Cummins, 25, was shot in the back in Longmoor Lane, Fazakerley, on 20 January 2011. The case was dubbed "murder in the mist" because of foggy conditions, and a £20,000 reward was on offer for information that led to his killers being prosecuted.
February 2011	Samuel Guidera	Attacked in Sydenham, London, died in hospital	Guidera, a 24-year-old university student, was stabbed in the heart and had his wallet stolen after getting off a train at Penge East railway station on 12 February 2011. Minutes before he was found injured near the station, his mobile phone had been used to dial an inactive and unregistered number.
February 2011	Lee Duncan	Edinburgh	31-year-old Duncan's body was discovered on 25 February 2011 in his flat in Lauriston Place, near Edinburgh city centre. He had been bludgeoned to death with a hammer. His neighbour was tried for the murder but found not guilty.
February 2011	Ronald Cheese	Birmingham	Cheese, a Jamaican-born 53-year-old, was found stabbed to death in the living room of his flat in Handsworth, Birmingham, on 27 February 2011, and some of his 25 knife wounds were defensive in nature. Police were anxious to trace a television and a Samsung E1120 phone.
March 2011	Kelvin Easton	Mile End, London	23-year-old Easton was stabbed at the Boheme nightclub on Mile End Road, Mile End, in the early hours of 27 March 2011. It was argued at a man's murder trial that he and several other men had set upon Easton in revenge for his alleged stabbing of a cousin of that man, but the man was not convicted.
April 2011	Damian Chlywka	Warlingham, Surrey	Two gardeners found the body of a man wrapped in tarpaulin in a garden well at Audley Drive, Warlingham, on 15 November 2013. The body was later identified as that of Chlywka, 32, last seen at his home in Thornton Heath on 17 April 2011. Although the cause of death could not be ascertained, it was clear that Chlywka suffered a brutal assault and died about two-and-a-half years previously. The case featured on Crimewatch in February 2014 and several men were arrested and released without charge.
May 2011	Adeniyi Lateef Shode	Attacked in Northolt, London, died in hospital	21-year-old Shode was found collapsed and stabbed near the junction of Rowdell Road, Ealing Road and Kensington Road in Northolt on 2 May 2011. Nine arrests over his death were made between that month and October 2016.
May 2011	Randy Osei-Boateng	West Kensington, London	27-year-old Osei-Boateng, a Ghanaian living in Streatham, was shot on the afternoon of 9 May 2011 as he sat behind the wheel of a car parked in Lakeside Road, West Kensington. Within a few days it was reported that two people arrested – a 17-year-old and a 19-year-old – had both been released on bail.
May 2011	Scott Fletcher	Body not found	Police suspicions that the missing Hartlepool man was unlawfully killed, and that it may have been because he owed money, caused a murder inquiry to be launched in 2015 – a year that saw five men arrested in connection with the inquiry and then released without charge. Two more were arrested and released in 2016. 27-year-old Fletcher was last seen on 11 May 2011 near a garage at Wheatley Hill in County Durham.
June 2011	David Gower	Bulkington, Warwickshire	37-year-old Gower was shot and stabbed in an outbuilding at a friend's home in Bulkington on 26 June 2011. Nine men stood trial for Gower's murder and conspiracy to inflict grievous bodily harm on his friend, but the judge ordered the acquittal of each defendant after a claim had been made that the friend – a key prosecution witness – had fired a gun prior to escaping from his property and Gower's assailants. The murder was alleged to have happened because Gower had got in the way of an attack planned on his friend for revenge.
July 2011	Karoly Varga	Wellingborough, Northamptonshire	Varga was beaten to death with a small axe or similar at his home in Cannon Street, Wellingborough, in late July 2011. He was 76 and had moved from his native country of Hungary during the 1950s. A friend of Varga was charged with murder before having the case against him withdrawn.
August 2011	Stuart Horsman	Winchester, Hampshire	34-year-old Horsman became unwell at Winchester railway station on 3 August 2011 and died a few hours later from internal bleeding. Police think the bleeding was a consequence of an attack the homeless man suffered up to several days previously.
9 August 2011	Trevor Ellis	Attacked in Croydon, London, died in hospital	26-year-old Ellis was shot in the head shortly after he and friends got caught up in a car chase with a group of looters during the 2011 riots in London.
August 2011	Alisa Dmitrijeva	Anmer, Norfolk	17-year-old Dmitrijeva, a Latvian from the Cambridgeshire town of Wisbech, disappeared after she was spotted in a car with two men in King's Lynn, Norfolk, on 31 August 2011. Her body was found on the Sandringham Estate on 1 January 2012, but the cause of her death could not be determined. Police have not charged anyone with the murder but had questioned two men over it by September 2014.
September 2011	Lee Erdmann	Salford, Greater Manchester	37-year-old Erdmann died in the Wellington pub in Salford on 10 September 2011 after conversing with a man who shot him in the back as he was heading for the toilets. A second shot was fired into his chest before his face was stamped on. The perpetrator was thought to have texted someone while talking to Erdmann, asking them to bring a gun to the pub. Although Erdmann was not known to have visited this pub previously and the decision to murder him appeared to have been a last-minute one, it was speculated that it was a decision stemming from disrespect shown by him on an earlier occasion. The opinion of detectives, however, was that he was killed simply because he was from a different part of Salford than the pub was in.
September 2011	Isobel Dobson	Hessle, West Yorkshire	Two-year-old Dobson died in a fire at Hessle Farm, Hessle, a hamlet near Wakefield, on 30 September 2011. A barn had been deliberately set on fire, with the fire then spreading to a van which Dobson and her half-sister were in. The other girl was rescued from the blaze. The inquest into Dobson's death found that her stepfather could have started the fire; he had already been arrested over it but the Crown Prosecution Service had decided not to proceed.
October 2011	Akilakumar Kanthasamy	Mitcham, London	Kanthasamy, 28, was stabbed in the heart on 22 October 2011 during a fight in the car park of a community centre where a party was being held. Guests had been having money demanded off them at knifepoint by a group of people outside the building, witnesses later said. A man charged with murder claimed to have run away from the community centre before the stabbing and was cleared because of that and because there was not much scientific evidence to connect him to the offence.
November 2011	Azezur "Ronnie" Khan	East Dulwich, London	21-year-old Khan was shot in an apparent gangland attack on 3 November 2011 as he left Camberwell Old Cemetery following the funeral of an old school friend. Khan himself was not affiliated with any gangs, but his deceased friend had been a member of one with rivals whose territory the cemetery was located in.
December 2011	Justin Hague	Rotherham, South Yorkshire	40-year-old Hague was stabbed in Godric Drive, Brinsworth, Rotherham, on 3 December 2011. By the end of February 2012, two men had been arrested on suspicion of murder and released pending further inquiries, and four people – including Hague's 19-year-old son – had appeared in court on charges of aggravated burglary.
December 2011	John Lee Barrett	Attacked in Rochdale, Greater Manchester, died in hospital	On 25 December 2011, 31-year-old Barrett was punched, kicked and stabbed in a nightclub during a brawl sparked by him bumping into someone there. He died from the stab wound on 27 December. Twelve men were convicted of offences to do with the brawl, but it is not known who killed Barrett. One of the convicted men later himself died after being stabbed at a nightclub.
December 2011	Richard Williams	Birmingham	Williams, a homeless 58-year-old, was fatally beaten at a bus stop in Dudley Road, Birmingham, on 30 December 2011. The trial of a 35-year-old Russian man alleged to have been the perpetrator was halted when the prosecution offered no evidence against him.

=== 2012 ===
Year	Victim(s)	Location of body or bodies	Notes
January 2012	Joshua Green	Sheffield	27-year-old Green was stabbed in the neck during the early hours of New Year's Day whilst on the dance floor of the Stars Suite on Queens Road, Sheffield. It was an offence committed in the wake of an argument.
February 2012	Ali Armagan	Wood Green, London	The 32-year-old suspected gang boss was shot in his car when it was parked near Turnpike Lane tube station on 1 February 2012. Six men were acquitted of murder, but three of them admitted to conspiracy to cause grievous bodily harm.
February 2012	Earl Warburton	Lewisham, London	59-year-old Warburton was dragged into his bathroom and killed by a combination of compression to the neck and blows to the head after four men entered his flat on Loampit Hill, Lewisham, in the early hours of 15 February 2012. The flat was used as a brothel, and four female sex workers who were in it at the time were ordered to lie down and not look at the killers, who ransacked whilst there too and demanded to know where the money was kept as they searched.
March 2012	Tafadzwa "Taffy" Khan	Bawburgh, near Norwich, Norfolk	25-year-old Khan was stabbed to death on 18 March 2012 during a party at former boxing champion Herbie Hide's mansion. A fellow partygoer was charged with murder, but the charge against him was dropped.
April 2012	Connie French	Attacked in Colne, Lancashire, died in hospital	80-year-old French suffered acute bruising to her neck and chest at her home in North Street, Colne, when the property was being burgled on 27 March 2012. Although critically injured, she remained alive for a further 17 days and, due to damage to her larynx, communicated with detectives by writing on a notepad and mouthing answers whilst in a hospital bed. Police charged French's granddaughter's boyfriend first with burglary and causing grievous bodily harm and then, following the victim's death on 13 April, with murder, but he claimed at his trial that she had mistaken the culprit for him and was cleared. After the acquittal, police released a statement saying they were not looking for anyone else in connection with the crime.
May 2012	Emma Winnall	Birmingham	93-year-old Winnall was attacked in her bed at her home in Moseley on 30 April or 1 May 2012. She died in hospital from her injuries on 29 May. No motive could be established, and police said the attacker had entered with a key.
June 2012	Marvin Hogan	London	28-year-old Hogan was stabbed in the heart in Leyton during an attempt to stop one of a group of three men taking a keyring with his car key on it. A passer-by stopped and put a rucksack under Hogan's head before the emergency services arrived, but he died at the Royal London Hospital on the morning of 5 June.
June 2012	Joey Thompson	Liverpool	32-year-old Thompson, a senior member of the Strand Gang, was shot dead on 14 June in Ravensthorpe Green, a street in the Liverpool district of Norris Green. Police wanted to speak to whoever was in a dark Citroen C4 seen driving through the district at around the time of the incident. Thompson was a suspect in the unsolved murder of Danny McDonald, a man from a rival gang who was killed in a pub shooting on New Year's Day 2004.
July 2012	Tom Kirwan	Wolverhampton, West Midlands	Kirwan was stabbed in the back and through the heart on 8 July 2012 during a brawl outside a Wolverhampton nightclub. Five people were later jailed for affray, but who was behind the 23-year-old's death is still a mystery.
July 2012	Pamela Wheeler	Thamesmead, London	76-year-old Wheeler was found dead at her home on Newacres Road, Thamesmead, in July 2012. She is last known to have been alive on 9 July and was attacked in an apparent robbery. Wheeler's wrists and ankles were bound and she died from suffocation and a head injury.
August 2012	John McMurchie	Dundee	50-year-old McMurchie was stabbed in the heart after leaving a house because a physical altercation had taken place there. He was discovered in Fintry Terrace in Dundee during the early hours of 12 August 2012 and found to be deceased on arrival at the city's Ninewells Hospital.
August 2012	Kestutis Mickevicius	Beckton, London	44-year-old Mickevicius, a Lithuanian, was found dead on wasteland off Spur Road on 17 August 2012. He had worked at a carwash at a garden centre in Tunbridge Wells, Kent. Police traced Mickevicius's mobile phone and that of a colleague of his to the site where the body had been left and the colleague was subsequently tried for both murder and manslaughter, but the court did not convict him of either crime.
September 2012	Kyle Sheehan	Birmingham	16-year-old Sheehan died a week after an incident on 21 September in which he was stabbed in the leg in a park in Birmingham's Bartley Green district.
October 2012	Sabah Usmani, Hira Shakoor, Sohaib Shakoor, Muneeb Shakoor, Rayyan Shakoor, Maheen Shakoor	Harlow, Essex	Usmani, 44, and her five children (Hira, 12, Sohaib, 11, Muneeb, 9, Rayyan, 6, and Maheen, 3) died in an arson attack at their home in Barn Mead, Harlow, in the early hours of 15 October 2012. Usmani's husband, Abdul Shakoor, managed to escape and raise the alarm, but the fire spread too quickly for anyone else to survive. A car in the road was set on fire at the same time. An appeal for information in 2017 did not yield any new leads.
October 2012	Teon Palmer	Edmonton, London	28-year-old Palmer was stabbed once in the chest on 20 October 2012 following the slashing of all four of his car tyres, and was found in Edmonton's Montagu Road. Up to seven males were seen leaving the scene, some of them on bicycles. Three men were arrested in 2013 and released without charge.
December 2012	Jamie Starkey	Liverpool	On 2 December 2012, 21-year-old Starkey was fatally shot outside his home in Fazakerley just after telling his seven-year-old sister that he was going to help her put up a Christmas tree the next day. Starkey had non-fatally shot a drug dealer at the age of 16.
December 2012	John Roberts	Winlaton, Tyne and Wear	John "The Badge" Roberts, a father-of-one, was well known for selling pin badges on Newcastle United match days. On 16 December 2012 two police officers passing his home on Park Terrace, Winlaton, noticed that his front door had been left open, and found the 32-year-old dead inside with serious head injuries. Six people were arrested over his murder during the course of 2013, but all were released without charge.
December 2012	David "Les" Ross	Corby, Northamptonshire	On 17 December 2012, Ross, a 39-year-old nightclub partner and doorman who also worked as a taxi driver, choked to death on his own vomit in his hotel room after being badly beaten there in the early hours. A prime suspect twice apprehended in connection with his murder was killed in a road traffic collision in 2020.
December 2012	Kyle Vaughan	Body not found	24-year-old Vaughan, from Newbridge in Caerphilly County, was last seen on 30 December 2012. Later that night, his silver Peugeot 306 car was found on the A467 between Risca and Crosskeys; it is not known if he was driving it at that time. Gwent Police was soon treating Vaughan's disappearance as murder and arrested eight people in connection with his disappearance, including two on suspicion of murder, but all were later released without charge. In 2023 Crimestoppers increased its reward to £20,000, for information leading to finding out what happened to Vaughan. The same year, Gwent Police renewed its appeal for information and confirmed that its investigation into Vaughan's case "remains very much active".

=== 2013 ===
Year	Victim(s)	Location of body or bodies	Notes
January 2013	Robert Duff	Body not found	37-year-old Duff was last seen at a flat in Bredgar Road, Archway, north London, on 12 January 2013. He failed to turn up for his daughter's 18th birthday party that day and police believe he was killed in a fight. Two men were arrested on suspicion of his murder in May 2018 but were released. In November 2020, police divers searched the Highgate No. 1 Pond on Hampstead Heath in response to new information.
January 2013	Lisa Pour	Body not found	40-year-old Pour disappeared after a probation officer saw her on the afternoon of 16 January 2013. She was staying at a flat in Kilburn in northwest London at the time, and the property was frequented by people involved with drugs. Police opened a murder investigation in 2023.
February 2013	Joseph Burke-Monerville	Attacked in Clapton, London, died in hospital	19-year-old Burke-Monerville was shot as he sat in the back of a car in Hindrey Road, Clapton, on 16 February 2013. Three men stood trial for his murder but were acquitted in 2015. Burke-Monerville's brother Trevor was murdered in 1994 and nobody has been convicted of that killing either. Another brother, David, was murdered in June 2019.
March 2013	Karl Bradley	Liverpool	31-year-old Karl Bradley, brother of underworld figure Kirk Bradley, was discovered dead with gunshot wounds in Penshaw Close, West Derby, on 22 March 2013. It has been claimed that this murder and that of Nicky Ayers in April 2010 were ordered by the same drug boss.
April 2013	Paul Foster	Luton, Bedfordshire	46-year-old Foster was shot on the Lewsey Farm estate on 9 April 2013. Some of his friends and acquaintances were involved with the criminal world, and it seemed that the incident – one of 27 shootings in Luton over a period of a year – was part of a feud between people from that world.
April 2013	Samuel Harry	Attacked in Bromham, Bedfordshire, died in hospital	19-month-old Harry died at Addenbrooke's Hospital, Cambridge, on 22 April 2013 after suffering a bleed on his brain. The inquest into his death found that his injuries were caused by a "substantial blow" to the head and the coroner stated that he was unlawfully killed. Harry's mother and her partner gave conflicting accounts of what happened and the Crown Prosecution Service decided not to prosecute.
May 2013	Xhem Krasniqi	Attacked in Hove, East Sussex, died in hospital in Brighton	31-year-old Kransniqi was with his brother and nephew in Church Road, Hove, on 18 May 2013 when the trio were shot at. Kransniqi died in the early hours of 19 May and the other two narrowly avoided injury. A 32-year-old man was cleared of murder, two attempted murders, and possessing a gun illegally at a trial that concluded in February 2014.
June 2013	Vasilijs Ransevs	Lincoln	A friend found the body of the 33-year-old Latvian in his flat on 16 June 2013. He had suffered head injuries and arrests later took place, but no charges followed any of them.
July 2013	James Baillie	Attacked in Hamilton, died in hospital in East Kilbride (both in South Lanarkshire)	41-year-old Baillie suffered a fatal head injury and his 64-year-old mother suffered non-fatal arm, head and facial injuries after they got involved in a row with a group of people in Buchanan Crescent, Hamilton, on 23 July 2013. Baillie died three days later, and the following summer a former featherweight boxing champion was acquitted of his murder and the mother's attempted murder.
September 2013	Adeyemi Olugbuyi	Northampton	Olugbuyi's skeletal remains were found in January 2016 under a hedge not far from where, according to two female witnesses, he was stabbed on 13 September 2013 by one of a group of men. Four men arrested over the murder of the 31-year-old drug dealer were all released.
September 2013	Kyle McDonald	Battersea, London	McDonald, 19, collapsed and died in Coppock Close in Battersea on 18 September after being shot outside a primary school a few roads away. A plumber was charged because CCTV had captured his van in the area, but the Old Bailey cleared him of the offence.
November 2013	Ismail Essa	Park Royal, London	33-year-old Essa was stabbed to death on 3 November 2013 whilst embroiled in a disturbance outside a café on Gorst Road, Park Royal. In July 2014 a man who slashed another's face during the disturbance was cleared of murder but found guilty of violent disorder and wounding with intent.
December 2013	Antonio Rodney-Cole	Attacked in Stoke Newington, London, died in hospital	Rodney-Cole, 22, was stabbed in the leg on 2 December 2013. After the attack, he tried to drive away from the scene but collapsed at the wheel of his car in Stoke Newington's Marton Road, where an off-duty doctor treated him before paramedics arrived and took over. Five people were arrested and released.
December 2013	Rowan Thomas-Williams	London	20-year-old Thomas-Williams was shot at a party in Mulberry Court, Elgar Avenue, Neasden, in the early hours of 6 December 2013, and died after being taken to hospital by friends. A £20,000 reward was offered for information leading to a conviction.

=== 2014 ===
Year	Victim(s)	Location of body or bodies	Notes
February 2014	Angela Millington	Foulness Island, Essex	Of no fixed abode when she disappeared in early February 2014 at the age of 33, Millington's skeletal remains were discovered washed up on Foulness Island in June of that year. Though a cause of death could not be determined, foul play was nonetheless apparent from indications that a gaffer tape mask found close to the remains had been attached to her face.
February 2014	Mashboor Hussain	Tooting, London	73-year-old Hussain died after two men forced their way into his home on Selkirk Road, Tooting, at around 11:45 a.m. on 11 February 2014. One of the men was armed with a gun and Hussain collapsed after a scuffle. Although he had coronary heart disease, Hussain's death was attributed to the break-in and his case was treated as murder.
June 2014	Floarea Nicolae	Attacked in Edmonton, London, died in hospital	20-year-old Nicolae was found stabbed on Grove Street, Edmonton, after midnight on 1 June 2014, and died at a hospital in east London. A woman stood trial for her murder in December but was acquitted.
June 2014	Robert Hutchinson	Body not found	56-year-old Hutchinson vanished within a day of driving away from his Sunderland home on 23 June, and detectives are treating his disappearance as murder even though his body is yet to be discovered. His blue Nissan Micra was found in Stewart Street in the city.
August 2014	Aqeel Khan	Watford, Hertfordshire	Khan, 18, was stabbed in Croxley View, Watford, on 22 August 2014. Luton Crown Court was told that Khan and another youth fought after a group led by Khan chased him. A 17-year-old alleged to have been the other youth denied being present when the murder was committed and was acquitted.
October 2014	Pragaret "Charlie" Singh	Manchester	35-year-old Singh was shot outside his food business in Openshaw on 31 October 2014, and around £28,000 in takings was stolen. A detective chief inspector believed that the culprit was being shielded by a "small group of people".
November 2014	Dale Gordon	Manchester	Gordon was fatally beaten in Netherbury Close, Gorton, on 15 November 2014 after riding there on his moped. He was a 20-year-old singer and rapper whose stage name was Deezy and he had auditioned for The X Factor.
December 2014	Luke Jackson	Pimlico, London	33-year-old Jackson was stabbed to death at his mother's flat in Pimlico on 19 December 2014. A number of people have been arrested and released without charge.

=== 2015 ===
Year	Victim(s)	Location of body or bodies	Notes
January 2015	Jon Casey	Northampton	35-year-old Casey was stabbed in the street next to a busy road in Northampton early on the evening of 16 January 2015. He had been trying to get away from the assailant, according to a witness. Police have released the name of a suspect who is thought to have moved to another country, possibly Somalia.
February 2015	Redwan El-Ghaidouni	Uxbridge, London	38-year-old El-Ghaidouni was shot in his car on the driveway of his home in Vine Lane, Uxbridge, on the evening of 3 February 2015. CCTV filmed a suspect near the property that day, as well as on numerous occasions in the days leading up to it during what are thought to have been the same gunman's failed earlier missions. El-Ghaidouni had been released from jail the previous July after being sentenced in relation to the importation and possession of cannabis.
February 2015	Kevin Wilson	Liverpool	17-year-old Wilson was shot in the back at around 8:30 p.m. on 7 February 2015. The incident took place at the junction of Smithdown Road and Holmes Street in Wavertree, and he died later in hospital. Thirteen people have been arrested over Wilson's murder, but police say the investigation is still ongoing. A new appeal for information was made on the fifth anniversary of his death.
February 2015	Terry Isaacs	Attacked in Tulse Hill, London, died in hospital	56-year-old Isaacs was found in Bannister Close, Tulse Hill, with serious head injuries on 19 February 2015, and died five days later. Two mobile phones, his wallet, and his tobacco tin had been stolen.
March 2015	Jamie Connelly	Glasgow	28-year-old Connelly died at the Victoria Infirmary in Glasgow on 8 March 2015 after being stabbed in the heart outside his home in Greenhill Road, Rutherglen. His best friend, with whom he had apparently fallen out over a £600 debt Connelly owed him, was acquitted on a verdict of not proven. Connelly's father had testified that he had seen the friend lunge at Connelly that evening, but while the friend admitted that the two of them had fought in his car shortly before Connelly was stabbed, he rejected the allegation that he had been behind the stabbing.
April 2015	Martin Hamilton	West Lothian	When Hamilton's skull and parts of his spine were discovered in remote woodland on 17 December 2015, he had not been seen since 16 April. A man in custody awaiting trial to face allegations of shooting the 53-year-old violent career criminal before inflicting sharp and blunt-force injuries to his head, was released in March 2017 after being found to have terminal cancer. Glasgow's district of Blackhill had been one of Hamilton's main areas of operation prior to his 1992 imprisonment and subsequent relocation to Edinburgh.
April 2015	Ola Raji	Peckham, London	20-year-old Raji was shot and stabbed by two men who confronted him as he cycled onto the East Surrey Grove Estate, Commercial Way, Peckham, on 21 April 2015. There have been arrests but no one has been charged with his murder.
April 2015	Luiri "Laura" El-Hagrasi	Body not found	El-Hagrasi, originally from Latvia, disappeared after going to Heathrow Airport with family members on 22 April 2015 to catch a plane. Though it is still not known precisely why the 33-year-old failed to board the aircraft or what has become of her, Kent Police have nonetheless added her name to their list of victims of murders that have not been solved. El-Hagrasi was living in the Cliftonville area of Margate when she went missing.
June 2015	Lukey Maxwell	Tottenham, London	Maxwell, 22, was stabbed in the back in a road known as Northumberland Park and then found there shortly after midnight on 5 June 2015. Police charged a man with murder two days later, but prosecutors did not find the case against him sufficient to commit him to trial.
June 2015	Margaret Quinn	Rutherglen, South Lanarkshire	36-year-old Quinn sustained a stab wound to the back that pierced her heart at an address in Skye Road, Cathkin, on 12 June 2015. A man was charged with her murder and the attempted murder of a male cousin of hers, but the latter charge was withdrawn and the former found not proven. Partway through the suspect's trial, Quinn's cousin ran from the witness box and lunged at him, causing the other man to suffer a swollen forehead along with grazes at the top of his head and on the bridge of his nose. The cousin was sentenced to three years and four months for this attack and for threatening the suspect's partner.
June 2015	Christian Bagley	Hereford	30-year-old Bagley was walking under the Hunderton Bridge in Hereford when someone stabbed him to death on 21 June 2015. West Mercia Police made four arrests relating to his murder but has not charged anyone over it.
June 2015	John "Goldfinger" Palmer	South Weald, Essex	64-year-old Palmer was reputed to have once been Britain's richest criminal. He was shot six times at close range in the garden of his home in South Weald on 24 June 2015. Police believe his murder was a contract killing and a reward of £100,000 was offered.
July 2015	Erdogan Guzel	Wood Green, London	42-year-old Guzel was one of three people shot as he sat outside his bakery on Lordship Lane on 10 July 2015, but the other two survived. The shots were fired from a black Honda Civic with a fake registration number.
August 2015	Albert Williams	Southend, Essex	On 8 August 2015, at his flat in Cedar Close in Southend, 67-year-old Williams was strangled and had his chest flattened – probably as a result of being stamped on – by one or more burglars who stole approximately £10,000 before his body was burnt. It came just seven days after a previous burglary there during which he was assaulted. Two men in their 40s were tried for both burglaries and attacks but found guilty of the earlier ones only, for which they were each sentenced to eight and a half years in prison. Another man in his 40s has also been a suspect in the second burglary and fatal assault, but was never charged with either offence.
August 2015	Marvin Couson	Attacked in Shoreditch, London, died 13 years later	Couson was 26 when he was shot outside the Lime Bar in Shoreditch on 12 May 2002. His injuries left him paralysed and unable to communicate and were the cause of his death on 8 August 2015. Police arrested a man in May 2019.
September 2015	Tadas Jarusevicius	Plumstead, London	29-year-old Jarusevicius was found dead beneath a bridge in Plumstead High Street on 23 September 2015. He had been living there with a group of people, and died from blunt-force trauma to the head and neck. Several people have been arrested and released without charge.
September 2015	David Brickwood	Northampton	74-year-old Brickwood was fatally stabbed in his Northampton home during a burglary on 26 September 2015. In April 2021, a judge told the jurors at a 27-year-old man's trial that because his DNA at the crime scene could have been due to secondary transfer, they were to acquit him of both murder and burglary.
September 2015	Duncan Banks	Dunfermline, Fife	39-year-old Banks was found dead at his flat on Skye Road, Dunfermline, on 28 September 2015. He had been repeatedly hit on the head with a blunt instrument – probably a rusty claw hammer – and money, heroin and a spare key to the flat were missing. A fellow heroin addict was charged with murder, but at his trial, the jury delivered a verdict of not proven.
October 2015	Samuel Marriott-Gray	Attacked in Oxford, died nine years later	21-year-old Marriott-Gray was knifed outside a blues night after-party in Blackbird Leys on 19 August 2006 during a brawl that followed a dispute about paying £5 to get in. The weapon was thrust into his neck and entered his brain, and he became persistently vegetative as a result. A man was convicted of attempted murder in 2007, but at a 2017 murder trial after Marriott-Gray's death on 31 October 2015, he was cleared. A defence lawyer at the 2007 trial acknowledged that Marriott-Gray named the suspected knifeman as the perpetrator but said he could have been mistaken in doing so, and added that family members of Marriott-Gray who were present at the scene might have lied or embellished to help secure a conviction against the man whose culpability they believed in.
November 2015	Ladimeji Benson	Chelmsford, Essex	27-year-old Benson, a Colchester resident who ran a trainer shop in Southend, died in hospital after he was stabbed in Chelmsford city centre when he got into an argument. Although at least three arrests have since been made in connection with his murder, police have yet to charge anybody with it.
November 2015	Clocaenog Forest Man	Clocaenog Forest, Wales	On the evening of 14 November 2015, two brothers out camping in woodland found part of the skull of a man who had lain dead for up to 20 years. Detectives believe he died after being struck on the head at another location and was then taken to the woods between 1995 and 2005.
December 2015	Mumtaz Member	Leicester	56-year-old Member's body was found with head, facial and neck injuries at her home in Stoneygate, Leicester, on 12 December 2015. Three people – the dead woman's sons and the wife of one of them – were charged with her murder, but the charges against them were all dropped.

=== 2016 ===
Year	Victim(s)	Location of body or bodies	Notes
January 2016	Harjit Singh Dulai	Hayes, London	44-year-old Dulai was stabbed in the chest near a tennis court in Rosedale Park, Hayes, on 27 January 2016. A 16-year-old boy stood trial for his murder but was acquitted in July 2017. Several other people have been arrested and released without charge.
February 2016	Tommy Ward	Rotherham, South Yorkshire	Ex-soldier and ex-miner Ward, 80, was found badly beaten at his home in Maltby, South Yorkshire, on 1 October 2015, and a safety deposit box with his life savings of approximately £30,000 inside it had been taken from there. He died in hospital in Rotherham on 23 February 2016. A number of arrests have been made but without any charges following.
March 2016	Junior Nelson	Northolt, London	52-year-old Nelson's remains were found on an overgrown embankment on Rabournmead Drive, Northolt, on 13 March 2016. Nelson lived in Kilburn and was last seen the previous year on 17 August. Although the post-mortem results were inconclusive, police believe he died violently.
March 2016	Robyn Mercer	West Molesey, Surrey	50-year-old Mercer was found bludgeoned to death outside her home on Walton Road, West Molesey, on 14 March 2016. Several people have been arrested over the antique dealer's death, but nobody has been convicted except her ex-partner for forging a will in her name.
April 2016	Lewis Elwin	Tooting, London	20-year-old Elwin received a stab wound to the chest in Tooting on the afternoon of 18 April 2016 after a family member dropped him off there. A silver Peugeot described as "suspect" was seen travelling in the area at the time of the crime before being found abandoned and burnt in Putney.
April 2016	Unidentified male	Forest Gate, London	The skeletal remains of a man were found in a disused factory on 29 April 2016. He died from blunt-force trauma to the skull, was aged between 29 and 35, and most likely came from the Indian subcontinent. He was murdered between 2003 and 2006. The remains were in a sleeping bag and partially wrapped in a bin bag. Blood matched to his DNA was found in a first-floor room in the factory, leading police to believe that was where the killing took place.
May 2016	Rukevwe Tadafe	Attacked in Bermondsey, died in hospital in another part of London	21-year-old Tadafe was stabbed during a fight on Trundley's Walk, Bermondsey, on 30 April 2016. A man stood trial for his murder later that year but was acquitted.
May 2016	Abdi Gutale	Leyton, London	24-year-old Gutale, a minicab driver, was shot as he drove his Vauxhall Zafira at the junction of Melbourne Road and Capworth Street, Leyton, in the early hours of 14 May 2016. Five men were arrested but released without charge.
June 2016	Matthew Kitandwe	Battersea, London	18-year-old Kitandwe was stabbed outside his flat on Wayford Street, Battersea, at 4:16 p.m. on 21 June 2016. Kitandwe was a talented footballer and police found no evidence that he had criminal connections. Eight people have been arrested and released.
July 2016	Ricardo Hunter	Headley, Surrey	34-year-old Hunter, known as "Forty", was shot dead during a party at a house on Church Lane, Headley, in the early hours of 25 July 2016. Hunter was from south London and was one of around 400 guests at the event. Three people have been arrested and released without charge, and a £10,000 reward has been offered.
August 2016	Andrew Oteng-Owusu	Attacked in New Cross, London, died in hospital	19-year-old Oteng-Owusu died from a single stab wound to his leg after an attack at the junction of Hornshay Street and Lovelinch Close on 3 August 2016. He returned to his home in Upnall House, Sharratt Street, where he was found by his mother. A reward of £20,000 was offered.
August 2016	Gary Weir	Glasgow	24-year-old Weir was stabbed in the heart during a fight between two groups of people in east Glasgow on 7 August 2016. Five men were cleared in late 2017 of his murder and the attempted murders of three men who were with him on the night he was killed.
August 2016	David "Dawood" Robinson	Archway, London	25-year-old Robinson was shot four times at Big House 101 recording studio on Sunnyside Road, Archway, on 20 August 2016. Despite there being witnesses to the crime, no one has been prosecuted for it. In February 2018, at the inquest into Robinson's death, his mother confronted the man who she believed carried out the shooting.
August 2016	Grzegorz Pietrycki	Wood Green, London	25-year-old Pietrycki was found stabbed in an alley off Glendale Avenue, Wood Green, on 23 August 2016. Two men convicted of murder in 2017 were cleared at the Appeal Court in 2021. CCTV filmed a third suspect following Pietrycki after he left his home (the two others were filmed as well, but they headed in a different direction). This suspect likewise faced trial, but a hung jury led to his acquittal. Pietrycki was originally thought to have been fatally stabbed in his flat and to have then gone to the alley around the corner, but the alley turned out to be where he suffered the death-causing neck wound.
September 2016	Beyake Keita-Ann	Attacked in Bradford, West Yorkshire, died in hospital in Leeds	On 23 August 2016, Keita-Ann, a 21-year-old Gambian, was playing football in Attock Park in Bradford when a parked car was unintentionally hit by the ball, and a group of people, taking exception to this, attacked those in his group. Keita-Ann was beaten with a baseball bat in the incident, and he died on 14 September. In December 2021, a 27-year-old man received a 21-month suspended jail sentence and was ordered to do 180 hours of unpaid work after pleading guilty to using or threatening unlawful violence with others, but it was acknowledged that, although he drove a man away from the scene, he did not actually harm Keita-Ann and was not carrying a weapon.
October 2016	Kacper Latuszek	Walthamstow, London	31-year-old Latuszek was found dead at a house on Forest Road, Walthamstow, on 8 October 2016. A post-mortem found that his death was caused by internal bleeding. Two men were arrested but released.
October 2016	Jodie Wilkinson	Newcastle	In Arthur's Hill in Newcastle on the afternoon of 17 October 2016, a man barged into and then racially abused a man in the group 27-year-old Wilkinson was a part of. Following a remonstration from the other man and some aggressive posturing, things calmed down and he and Wilkinson left the scene, but trouble started again when he went back to look for legal highs he had dropped and people decided to attack him and his companions. A short while later, Wilkinson and another person in her group received stab wounds. The other victim survived but Wilkinson died after phoning the emergency services. A man tried for her murder was acquitted of any wrongdoing, but four other men pleaded guilty to and were jailed for violent disorder.
October 2016	Blake Brown	Liverpool	Brown, a 30-year-old acquitted at the age of 19 of the November 2004 murder of Paul Mooney, was fatally shot near St Michaels railway station in Liverpool on 24 October 2016. One man was cleared of being involved in any plot to kill or hurt Brown, and two brothers each received a suspended sentence for perverting the course of justice.
October 2016	Ziggy Worrell-Owusu	Ilford, London	19-year-old Worrell-Owusu was stabbed at an 18th birthday party at the Basement Shisha Lounge, Goodmayes Road, Ilford, in the early hours of 27 October 2016. Reportedly he was trying to break up a fight. Three people were arrested and released without charge.
November 2016	James Owusu-Agyekum	Harlesden, London	22-year-old Owusu-Agyekum was shot dead on 2 November 2016 by someone who fired through his open front door. The gunman and an accomplice are thought to have fled to the nearby Stonebridge Estate on bicycles after the attack, which police believed was likely a case of mistaken identity. A reward of £20,000 was offered.
November 2016	Michael Currer	Norwich, Norfolk	59-year-old Currer was found dead in his flat on 12 November 2016. His body had multiple injuries, but no weapon appeared to have been used on him and there was no sign of forced entry. Currer had phoned the police on 9 November, but did not want them to come to his residence; when officers went there anyway, he refused them entry and told them to leave. In February 2017, Currer's on-off partner confessed to killing him and was arrested, but the Crown Prosecution Service found there was insufficient evidence to prosecute her. At the inquest into Currer's death, she denied killing him.
November 2016	Mohamed Kakay	Camberwell, London	33-year-old Kakay was stabbed in gardens at the back of St Giles' Church, Camberwell, at 9:00 a.m. on 19 November 2016. He collapsed in Camberwell Church Street, and is believed to have been attacked by two people. Several suspects have been arrested, but no one has been charged. Two years after Kakay's death a £20,000 reward was offered.
December 2016	Thomas Roberts	Glasgow	A 35-year-old man was tried for the murder of 43-year-old Roberts and an assault on a 50-year-old friend of his in the early hours of 25 December 2016, but was found guilty only of the latter offence, with a verdict of not proven over the murder. The defendant claimed in court that, far from being responsible for the attack that led to Roberts's death, he actually intervened to try to stop it and that Roberts was killed by his friend. Roberts's friend, however, maintained that the defendant alone was the assailant. The attack happened in a communal area of the district of Milton and much of it was witnessed by people in flats overlooking the area.

=== 2017 ===
Year	Victim(s)	Location of body or bodies	Notes
January 2017	Thomas Baker	Liverpool	44-year-old Baker was shot in a car park after leaving the gym at Liverpool's Stanley Meat Market on 27 January 2017. CCTV captured a car that the police think was being driven by the gunman as it headed away from there – a silver Volkswagen Polo also caught on CCTV at other locations in the city.
February 2017	Aaron Lewis	Liverpool	Lewis, 26, was fatally shot outside the Anna Jungs chip shop on Grosvenor Road, Wavertree, on 1 February 2017. A friend who was with him was also shot in the attack but survived. Eight people were arrested and released without charge.
February 2017	Hang Yin Leung	Milton Keynes, Buckinghamshire	64-year-old Leung was beaten by intruders who burgled her home in Orne Gardens, Bolbeck Park, on 31 January 2017. She died in hospital 11 days later. Four men were arrested, but there was insufficient evidence to charge anyone. The case was featured on the Channel 4 documentary Catching a Killer in May 2018.
February 2017	Jonathon "JJ" McPhillips	Islington, London	28-year-old McPhillips was stabbed in the chest in Upper Street, Islington on 25 February 2017 when a group of males armed with knives attacked the group he was part of. A man was due to stand trial for the murder in August 2018, but the case collapsed.
March 2017	Craig Kearney	East Kilbride, South Lanarkshire	24-year-old Kearney was discovered fatally injured in the road on 5 March 2017 after getting out of a taxi whose driver he had been arguing with. A murder charge against the driver was found by a jury to be not proven. He had maintained that his vehicle had only clipped Kearney as he drove away from where he had dropped him and his girlfriend off, and not mown him down as the charge alleged. Kearney's girlfriend did not witness him receiving his injuries as she had started to walk home without him.
March 2017	David Adegbite	Barking, London	18-year-old Adegbite, known as Dutch, was shot in the head as he cycled through an estate in St Ann's, Barking, on 19 March 2017. A number of men were arrested but no one has been charged in relation to his murder.
March 2017	Malachi Brooks	Battersea, London	21-year-old Brooks was attacked in the early hours of 28 March 2017 in Surrey Lane, Battersea. Four masked men pulled up in a vehicle and three of them attacked Brooks, who died from a stab wound to the heart. Three men were convicted of perverting the course of justice, but no one has been convicted of Brooks's murder. A £20,000 reward was offered on the second anniversary of his death.
April 2017	Bjorn Brown	Attacked in Croydon, London, died in hospital	CCTV captured 23-year-old Brown talking to two suspects in Bensham Lane, Croydon, on 29 March 2017. He then went with them into Kelling Gardens, where he was knifed off camera. Following the stabbing, the suspects fled while the fatally injured Brown rode his bicycle away before collapsing. He died on 3 April. Crimestoppers offered a £20,000 reward for information resulting in a prosecution.
April 2017	Karim Samms	North Woolwich, London	16-year-old Samms died from a gunshot wound to the chest on Roebourne Way, North Woolwich, on the evening of 7 April 2017. CCTV revealed two suspects approaching a group of people which included Samms; they fled in a car after the shooting.
April 2017	Abdullah Hammia	Wandsworth, London	24-year-old Hammia was fatally stabbed during an altercation on Melody Road, Wandsworth, close to the junction with Allfarthing Lane, on 25 April 2017. Later the same year, two men were jailed for perverting the course of justice. Two men were charged with Hammia's murder, but the charges were dropped.
May 2017	Patricia Finnie	Body not found	Finnie has not been seen since 11 May 2017, when the then 64-year-old went missing after visiting a friend at an address elsewhere in Southend, Essex. A man was bailed in June 2023 following his arrest on suspicion of her murder.
May 2017	Mohanna Abdhou	Kilburn, London	20-year-old Abdhou, known as Montana, was shot on the South Kilburn Estate on 26 May 2017. She was caught in gunfire from two masked men on bicycles and was hit by a bullet which ricocheted off a wall. Two men and a 17-year-old boy stood trial for murder and manslaughter in 2018 but were found not guilty.
May 2017	Jaymie Hall	Edinburgh	35-year-old Hall was stabbed at his flat in Wester Hailes, Edinburgh, on 27 May 2017. A friend of his was tried for murder and acquitted on a not proven verdict. He claimed while on trial that another man was the killer, asserting that the other man, who died in late 2017, stabbed Hall following a physical confrontation. Allegedly the other man came off worse in the confrontation and that was his motive for the knife attack.
June 2017	Yusuf Sonko	Liverpool	18-year-old Sonko was shot in the head while he stood with a group of friends in Tagus Street, Toxteth, on 2 June 2017. The killer had approached the group on a bicycle and it is believed that Sonko was not the intended target. Nine people were questioned soon after the killing and in 2019 police released the name of an individual of interest. A £20,000 reward has been offered.
June 2017	Abdirahman Mohamed	Peckham, London	Mohamed died within half an hour of being stabbed in the chest at around 11:00 p.m. on 2 June 2017. At the murder trial of two young men several months later, it was alleged that the 17-year-old had been killed because he had made fun of one of the accused for having been arrested for possession of a samurai sword. The suspects were found not guilty. Later that year, one of those men was himself fatally stabbed, but the person who dealt the blow was cleared on the grounds of self-defence.
June 2017	Mahad Ali	Attacked in Park Royal, London, died in hospital	18-year-old Ali was fatally stabbed at a warehouse party in Coronation Road, Park Royal, on 29 June 2017. The case against a man charged with his murder was dropped in January 2018.
August 2017	Joshua Bwalya	Barking, London	16-year-old Bwalya was fatally stabbed in Movers Lane, Barking, on 2 August 2017. He had attended a school leavers' party and was attacked by a group of youths on bicycles.
August 2017	Cafer Aslan	Edmonton, London	54-year-old Aslan was found with fatal gunshot injuries in Westminster Road, Edmonton, on 23 August 2017. His cousin Bulent Kabala was shot dead six months later, in February 2018. Police have described both murders as contract killings and offered a £20,000 reward.
September 2017	Corey Junior Davis	Attacked in Forest Gate, London, died in hospital	14-year-old Davis, known as CJ, died after a drive-by shooting in Moore Walk, Forest Gate, at 3:08 p.m. on 4 September 2017. His mother claimed that he was being groomed by a drugs gang. In August 2018, a serious case review found that Davis and his mother were failed by local agencies which could have protected them from gang culture.
September 2017	Jude Gayle	West Norwood, London	Gayle, 30, was fatally stabbed on 24 September 2017 after he visited a shop in West Norwood to buy a bottle of ketchup for lunch with his mother. Three men stood trial for his murder but were found not guilty.
September 2017	Unidentified male	Wimbledon, London	The skeletal remains of an unknown male were found in a shallow grave in the back garden of a house on Cowdrey Road on 28 September 2017. The man, wearing a shirt, a red silk tie, trousers, shoes and socks, had been killed by a blow to the head and then dismembered. He was aged 35 to 55, 5 feet 7 inches (1.70 m) tall and of a muscular build, and was likely Asian. Carbon dating suggested he had been killed in the early 1960s.
October 2017	Jamie Perkins	Gilfach Goch, South Wales	The body of Perkins, a father-of-one who had once boxed for Wales, was found in a culvert in Gilfach Goch on 1 November 2017. He had not been seen since 8 October, when he was living in a hotel in nearby Tonyrefail. Four arrests over the 41-year-old's murder were made within several weeks of his body being discovered, but none of the people arrested was charged.
November 2017	Adam Ellison	Prescot, Merseyside	29-year-old Ellison became involved in an argument with people on a motorcycle in a pedestrianised area of Prescot on 4 November 2017. He was fatally stabbed. The distinctive Kawasaki motorcycle was recovered and is believed to have links to Plymouth.
November 2017	Anthony Nicholls	Birmingham	56-year-old Nicholls and his partner were having a meal in their home in Birchtrees Drive, Birmingham, on 2 November 2017 when intruders broke in and a large firework was set off, triggering a blaze. Nicholls suffered severe burns and smoke inhalation before being rescued by firefighters, and died on 7 November. His partner managed to escape by jumping from a first floor window, suffering a broken leg.
November 2017	Jordan Ajobo	Attacked in North Woolwich, London, died in hospital	21-year-old Ajobo was fatally stabbed in Pier Road, North Woolwich, on the evening of 8 November 2017. Police named two men they were searching for in connection with his death, one of whom was later detained by officers in Exeter for an unrelated matter and then released.
November 2017	Piotr Woroniecki	Clapham, London	32-year-old Woroniecki was pronounced dead in Parma Crescent, Clapham, on 23 November 2017. A post mortem found he had died from compression to the neck and police believed he had been held in a headlock for a long time. Three men have been arrested and released.
December 2017	Janet Moore	Struck by a car in West Molesey, Surrey, died in hospital six days later	During the early hours of 26 November 2017, shouting was heard and a car was seen speeding away from The Hurst Pool's car park. First responders found 54-year-old Moore there with serious injuries caused by vehicle impact, which proved fatal. A man arrested in January 2018 was still a person of interest four months later.
December 2017	Alex Vanderpuye	Hackney, London	24-year-old Vanderpuye was stabbed to death at the junction of Cassland Road and Christie Road, Hackney, on 7 December 2017. A number of people have been arrested and released. In 2019, police offered a £20,000 reward for information.
December 2017	Taofeek Lamidi	West Ham, London	20-year-old Lamidi was fatally stabbed on Memorial Avenue, West Ham, on the evening of 31 December 2017. Police said he was with a number of other people at the time of the attack.

=== 2018 ===
Year	Victim(s)	Location of body or bodies	Notes
January 2018	Harun Jama	Oxford	16-year-old Jama, a Birmingham resident visiting Oxford, was stabbed in Friars Wharf on 3 January 2018. Several arrests have been made over his murder but no charges filed.
January 2018	Yaya Mbye	Attacked in Stoke Newington, London, died in hospital	26-year-old Mbye was found stabbed on the George Downing Estate in Stoke Newington on 28 January 2018. Police believe three males were behind the attack and that they left the scene in a silver car.
February 2018	Bulent Kabala	Barnet, London	41-year-old Kabala was shot dead on Mount Pleasant, near Edgeworth Road, Cockfosters, at about 11:45 p.m. on 12 February 2018. His car had been hit by a Ford Transit van which had been following him and he was shot when he got out of his vehicle. A man was arrested but later released. Kabala's cousin Cafer Aslan had been murdered six months previously, in August 2017. Police have described both murders as contract killings and offered a £20,000 reward.
February 2018	Jason Williams	Basingstoke, Hampshire	41-year-old Williams was knifed to death in an alley in South Ham, Basingstoke, during the early hours of 20 February 2018. Two men in their 30s and described as crack cocaine addicts were tried for murder and manslaughter. A desire to rob Williams of his drugs and money was said to have led to the attack, but both defendants were found not guilty. It had been alleged that one of them had carried out the attack while the other remained in a van driven to and from the scene.
March 2018	Georgina Gharsallah	Body not found	Gharsallah, 30, disappeared from her home town of Worthing in West Sussex on 7 March 2018. CCTV recorded someone who appeared to be her walking with a woman along the town's Chapel Road that afternoon, but neither woman's identity has been determined. Gharsallah's case was reclassified as one of murder in August 2019.
March 2018	Kelvin Odunuyi	Attacked in Wood Green, London, died in hospital	Odunuyi, 19, was fatally shot on 8 March 2018 outside the Vue cinema in Wood Green. It is believed that the killing was a revenge attack for the murder of Kwabena "Kobi" Nelson in Tottenham in February 2018.
March 2018	Nikolay Glushkov	New Malden, London	Glushkov, 68, was found dead at his home in Clarence Avenue, New Malden, on 12 March 2018. The cause of death was determined to be strangulation. There was no sign of forced entry at the property and the murder allegedly bore the hallmarks of a contract killing. Glushkov was Russian and a prominent critic of the Kremlin, and had been granted political asylum in the UK in 2004.
March 2018	Jermaine Johnson	Walthamstow, London	41-year-old Johnson was stabbed to death at his flat on Vallentin Road, Walthamstow, on 19 March 2018. His partner's 16-year-old son surrendered himself to police custody three days later after refusing to answer questions, and in June 2018, the case against him was discontinued.
March 2018	Johnny Robbins, Daniel Shaw	Coventry, West Midlands	28-year-old Shaw was found with gunshot injuries near his home in Tile Hill, Coventry, a few days after the disappearance of 33-year-old Robbins, who remains unaccounted for. The police believe that Robbins was murdered as well and have linked the two men's deaths, which a missing man who may also have been murdered is wanted in connection with. Six men went on trial in January 2026, but the trial collapsed due to evidential difficulties. Three of the men were accused of conspiracy to murder Robbins, three of kidnap, four of false imprisonment, and two of perverting the course of justice. No one has been charged over Shaw's death.
March 2018	Abraham Badru	Hackney, London	26-year-old Badru was shot dead as he opened the boot of his car in Ferncliff Road, Hackney, on 25 March 2018. Investigators were unsure of the motive; one possibility is mistaken identity. A reward of £20,000 was offered.
March 2018	Reece Tshoma	Attacked in Plumstead, London, died in hospital	23-year-old Tshoma was stabbed in the neck near Plumstead railway station on 29 March 2018 and died in hospital sometime after 8:37 p.m. that day after being driven there by a friend he had called.
April 2018	Devoy Burton-Stapleton	Earlsfield, London	20-year-old Burton-Stapleton, a college student, suffered a fatal street stabbing in the early hours of 1 April 2018 after exiting a bar near Wandsworth Common. A man charged with murder had his case dismissed before his trial was due to commence.
April 2018	Tanesha Melbourne-Blake	Tottenham, London	Melbourne-Blake, 17, was fatally shot as she stood with friends on Chalgrove Road, Tottenham, at 9:35 p.m. on 2 April 2018. She had no links to any gangs, and police believed her death was related to an ongoing territory dispute. In 2020, police made a new appeal for information and announced that the gun used to kill Melbourne-Blake – a gun thought to have been passed between gangs – had been found and had also been used in the murder of Joseph Williams-Torres in Walthamstow on 14 March 2018. Three men were jailed for Williams-Torres's murder, which was a case of mistaken identity. Five men had been arrested and released in connection with Melbourne-Blake's death as of January 2020. Two men were charged with her murder in July 2024 and are due to go on trial in March 2025.
April 2018	Amaan Shakoor	Attacked in Walthamstow, London, died in hospital	In what may have been a gangland killing, 16-year-old Shakoor was shot in the face outside Walthamstow Leisure Centre on 2 April 2018 and died of his injuries in an east London hospital.
April 2018	Sami Sidhom	Forest Gate, London	18-year-old Sidhom, a history and law student, was stabbed to death in Chestnut Avenue, Forest Gate while on his way home from a football match on 16 April 2018. He is believed to have been targeted in a case of mistaken identity. Ten males between the ages of 15 and 35 have been arrested over the attack but no one has been charged.
April 2018	Kwasi Anim-Boadu	Finsbury Park, London	20-year-old Anim-Boadu was stabbed to death outside a house party in Roth Walk, Finsbury Park during the early hours of 21 April 2018.
May 2018	Rhyhiem Ainsworth Barton	Camberwell, London	Barton, 17, was shot while playing football on the evening of 5 May 2018. He died shortly after the attack and his body was found on Warham Street, Camberwell.
May 2018	Fatah Warsame	Liverpool	20-year-old Warsame, from Cardiff, was fatally stabbed in Liverpool city centre whilst on a night out on 6 May 2018. A man was arrested on suspicion of his murder and released without charge.
May 2018	Naheed Khan	Body not found	The body of 43-year-old Khan has not been found, but police are treating her disappearance in Middlesbrough as murder. Khan was last seen on 4 May 2018. Money was withdrawn from her bank account from a cash machine in central Middlesbrough two days later; the account has remained untouched since. Crimestoppers is offering an award of £10,000 for information leading to an arrest and conviction. Five men have been arrested and released without charge. In June 2020, police announced that they were scaling back the investigation.
May 2018	Annalise Johnstone	Near Dunning, Perthshire	Johnstone, 22, was killed at Maggie Wall's memorial near Dunning on 10 May 2018. Her throat was cut. Johnstone's brother stood trial over her death; although he admitted dumping her body, he denied murder and the jury reached a verdict of not proven. A woman also faced charges but was acquitted of them all.
June 2018	Mark Tremain	Attacked in Stockwell, London, died later in hospital	Tremain, 52, suffered serious facial injuries during a fight in Albert Square, Stockwell, on 31 May 2018. He died in hospital two weeks later, on 14 June.
June 2018	Ishak Tacine	Edmonton, London	20-year-old Tacine was fatally stabbed in a fight on Cavendish Road, Edmonton, in the early evening of 27 June 2018. He died at the scene.
July 2018	Latwaan Griffiths	Attacked in Brixton, London, died later in hospital	Drill rapper Griffiths, 18, was stabbed in Minet Road, Brixton, on the evening of 25 July 2018. A moped rider then took him to Denmark Road in Camberwell, where he was left and where members of the public gave him first aid, and he died in hospital shortly after midnight.
August 2018	Joel Urhie	Deptford, London	Seven-year-old Urhie died in an arson attack on his family's home in Adolphus Street, Deptford, on 7 August 2018. His mother and sister managed to escape. An appeal was made on Crimewatch Roadshow in March 2019, and two men have been arrested and released without charge.
August 2018	Kavan Brissett	Sheffield	21-year-old Brissett died in hospital four days after he was stabbed in a car park in Upperthorpe on 14 August. Four men have been charged with conspiracy to rob him, but a man whom police still want to question about his death has been missing since September 2018 and is feared to have left the country.
September 2018	Ismail Tanrikulu	Tottenham, London	Tanrikulu, 22, was shot in Tottenham Cemetery on 3 September 2018. A man stood trial for his murder in March 2019 and was acquitted.
September 2018	Elyon Poku	Attacked in Stamford Hill, London, died in hospital	20-year-old Poku was stabbed while DJing at an 18th birthday party on 22 September 2018. Those who attended have been disinclined to tell the police about anything they saw or heard there.
September 2018	Guled Farah	Attacked in Walthamstow, London, died in hospital	19-year-old Farah was shot from a car in Vallentin Road soon after 11:00 p.m. on 22 September 2018. A man in his mid-20s was acquitted the following September when the case was abandoned by the Crown Prosecution Service.
October 2018	Carl Russell	Liverpool	Russell, 27, was shot as he and his partner got out of their car in Cornwood Close, Belle Vale, at around 11:30 a.m. on 7 October 2018. Three men were arrested but police made a new appeal for information on the second anniversary of Russell's death.
October 2018	Leroy Ottey	Liverpool	Ottey, 25, was shot in the back when returning to his home in Alderson Road, Wavertree, on the night of 17 October 2018. A black Audi which sped from the scene was later found burnt out nearby in Abbeystead Road.
October 2018	Tyrone Mulinde	Bridgwater, Somerset	Mulinde, a 20-year-old Ugandan national, was stabbed in the arm and heart on 20 October 2018 at a flat in a Bridgwater hostel known as Dampiet House. It was a flat that belonged to someone else but had been taken over by Mulinde and fellow drug dealers. A man and a woman from London were charged and committed to trial, with the man accused of stabbing Mulinde over money issues and the woman of helping her co-defendant carry out the act, but both were cleared.
October 2018	Ethan Nedd-Bruce	Greenwich, London	18-year-old Nedd-Bruce was shot outside Collins House, Armitage Road, Greenwich, on the evening of 22 October 2018, having been involved in an altercation with a group of men in neighbouring Woolwich Road shortly beforehand. In October 2020, police made a new appeal for information and offered a £20,000 reward.
November 2018	John Ogunjobi	Brixton, London	16-year-old Ogunjobi was fatally stabbed on the evening of 5 November 2018 in Greenleaf Close, on Brixton's Tulse Hill Estate. CCTV footage was released of two vehicles which could be linked to the murder. A year after Ogunjobi's death, police made a new appeal for information and offered a reward of £20,000.
November 2018	Valerie Kneale	Blackpool, Lancashire	75-year-old Kneale suffered a sexual assault, non-medical internal injuries and a fatal haemorrhage whilst a patient at Blackpool Victoria Hospital on 16 November 2018. She had been admitted to the hospital following a stroke.
November 2018	Peter Gouldstone	Attacked in Bounds Green, London, died in hospital	A violent burglary took place at 98-year-old Gouldstone's home on 6 November 2018. He died from his injuries on 30 November. Two suspects were captured on CCTV and two men were arrested but not charged.
December 2018	Shane Fox	Wellingborough, Northamptonshire	26-year-old Fox was making his way back to his flat on foot in the early hours of 1 December 2018 when an unknown person stabbed him in the chest as he neared the property on Wellingborough's Nest Farm Crescent. Detectives wanted to question someone caught on CCTV about five minutes before the incident.
December 2018	Richard Odunze-Dim	Edmonton, London	20-year-old Odunze-Dim was shot in a property on St Joseph's Road, Edmonton, on 18 December 2018. Believed to be connected to the incident is a black Audi that someone was driving nearby at about the time it took place.

=== 2019 ===
Year	Victim(s)	Location of body or bodies	Notes
February 2019	James Taylor	Liverpool	34-year-old Taylor was shot from close range by a man with a handgun in Addison Street, Liverpool, on 7 February 2019. He was shot several times in his van while waiting to pick up his daughter from the nearby Marybone Youth and Community Association, and the slaying was described as planned and gang-related.
April 2019	Calvin Bungisa	Kentish Town, London	22-year-old Bungisa was stabbed to death in a possibly gang-related street killing on 1 April 2019 after being chased by a group of men. A car believed to have been the getaway vehicle was later found abandoned and burnt out in Court Gardens, Highbury.
May 2019	Amanda Gretton	Blackheath, London	Gretton, 57, was reported missing on 15 May 2019 and found murdered near garages on Prendergast Road, Blackheath, on 5 July. A man and a woman in a white van were captured on CCTV at around the time of the murder.
July 2019	Cabdullahi Hassan	Attacked in South Hampstead, London, died in hospital	20-year-old Hassan and a man aged 22 were stabbed on Boundary Road on 25 July 2019, but the 22-year-old survived. Two cousins, one of whom was also stabbed, were cleared of murder after telling the court that they were unaware that there might be violence in the area as one of them drove a man there. A prosecutor said that that man was punched by Hassan at a railway station earlier on 25 July. The man left the UK on 26 July and has not been found, and he and others whose whereabouts are unknown remain suspects.
October 2019	Zoe Orton	Deptford, London	46-year-old Orton was found strangled to death at her flat by police on 21 October 2019. She was believed to have been killed three days after CCTV filmed her leaving Woolwich Arsenal station on 1 October.
December 2019	William "Blaise" Algar	Barnes, London	53-year-old Algar was a jazz musician who suffered from mental health issues. He disappeared on 1 December 2019 after CCTV filmed him riding his bicycle in Barnes, and his head and torso were discovered in his flat on 3 January 2020. Five people stood trial and three of them were found guilty of another man's murder, but none of them were found guilty of Algar's, despite convictions for perverting the course of justice in relation to his death. One of those tried was a drug dealer said to have fallen out with him over money. The other murder victim, 35-year-old Ebrima Cham, was stabbed to death on 19 December 2019.
December 2019	Natalie Jenkins	Body not found	Jenkins, a 32-year-old woman from Thornaby-on-Tees near Middlesbrough, disappeared in December 2019 and is presumed murdered. CCTV captured her walking in the direction of Middlesbrough's Albert Park after 11:00 p.m. on 10 December, and she is believed to have still been in the area in the early hours of 11 December. Several people were arrested and released without charge.
December 2019	Ulla Derrick	Died in hospital in Swindon from the effects of a fire in Devizes	A sofa in the communal staircase of a block of flats in Waiblingen Way, Devizes, Wiltshire, was set alight in the early hours of 17 December 2019, causing a blaze that led to the death of 51-year-old Derrick and to several others being injured. Police detained a suspect aged 20 before releasing him without charge.

== 2020s ==
=== 2020 ===
Year	Victim(s)	Location of body or bodies	Notes
April 2020	Kyle Whitley	Liverpool	18-year-old Whitley was stabbed in the chest in Litherland on 13 April 2020. Three people were arrested.
June 2020	Alexander Kareem	Shepherd's Bush, London	20-year-old Kareem, a computer student, was shot from a white Range Rover in an apparent case of mistaken identity as he rode an e-scooter along Askew Road, Shepherd's Bush, on 8 June 2020.
July 2020	Dean Edwards	Penge, London	43-year-old Edwards was shot while walking through Betts Park at night on 12 July 2020. Because he had no criminal connections, it appeared likely that the shooter had mistaken him for someone else. A 26-year-old man was acquitted in May 2022.
July 2020	Ahmed Yasin-Ali	Attacked in Maida Hill, London, died in hospital	18-year-old Yasin-Ali was found stabbed near Harrow Road on 15 July 2020. There have been a number of arrests but no charges over his death.
July 2020	Nadeem Butt	Manchester	50-year-old Butt's body was found at his home in Cheetham Hill on 5 August 2020, but his autopsy suggested that he died six days prior to the discovery. Butt's death was due to head injuries, and more than one person is believed to have been responsible for it.
August 2020	Unidentified male	Sudbury, Suffolk	Bones and severed legs of an unknown victim were found in bin bags in the River Stour at Sudbury on 27 August 2020. The deceased was a male of an athletic build, but no other details are known. On 25 May 2021 a man was arrested in relation to the discovery of the remains.
October 2020	Tamba Momodu	Telford, Shropshire	Momodu, 20, was shot six times in a car park outside a gym in Telford on 13 October 2020. He had moved to Telford from London after being acquitted of murder in relation to a fatal stabbing in Northolt in April 2017 (the acquittal was on the grounds of self-defence), and the shooting that caused his own death came to be seen as an act of retribution. Four men went on trial for Momodu's murder in 2026 (the second time they had done so; the first trial had collapsed in 2025), but two were found not guilty of the charge and no verdicts on the other two were reached. These two were the brother and cousin of the man whose murder Momodu had been acquitted of.

=== 2021 ===
Year	Victim(s)	Location of body or bodies	Notes
May 2021	Rhys Thompson	Rishworth, West Yorkshire	Detectives think that 29-year-old Thompson and three friends were involved in a cannabis-related confrontation with a group of men at a property in Manchester a few hours before his body was found near Pike End Road, Rishworth, on 13 May 2021. He had suffered lacerations, bruises, broken hands, a broken leg and nine blows to the head in an incident that has been linked to an Albanian gang.
October 2021	Wayne Smith	Attacked in Tongham, Surrey, died in hospital in London	37-year-old Smith was found stabbed near an underpass in Tongham on the evening of 15 October 2021, and died 12 days later at King's College Hospital. Before Smith's death, three males aged 16, 23 and 30 were arrested on suspicion of attempted murder, and after his death, the 16-year-old was rearrested on suspicion of murder.

=== 2022 ===
Year	Victim(s)	Location of body or bodies	Notes
January 2022	Scott Cooper	Ryde, Isle of Wight	Cooper, 33, was found stabbed to death in a shower on 4 January 2022. A man was found not guilty.
March 2022	Lamar Griffiths	Sheffield	21-year-old Griffiths was shot at a car wash in Burngreave, Sheffield, during the evening of 29 March 2022, but was likely not the intended target. Two men were jailed for destroying evidence and helping the two gunmen leave the UK.
May 2022	Carlo Giannini	Sheffield	34-year-old Giannini, a pizza chef originally from Italy, was stabbed in the chest in Manor Fields Park, Sheffield, during the early hours of 12 May 2022.

=== 2024 ===
Year	Victim(s)	Location of body or bodies	Notes
March 2024	Stuart Coldicott	Attacked in Colchester, Essex, died 10 years later	36-year-old Coldicott became paraplegic after an assault in Colchester on 11 February 2014, but detectives could not pinpoint the assault on anyone or be sure that his paralysis was due to that particular incident, prior to which he had already been seen with a number of cuts and bruises on his face in the Barrack Street and Harsnett Road areas of the town. A 61-year-old Colchester man was arrested on suspicion of murder and bailed in November 2024 following Coldicott's death eight months earlier.

=== 2025 ===
Year	Victim(s)	Location of body or bodies	Notes
October 2025	Rose Johnston	Dovecot, Liverpool	68-year-old Johnston was beaten to death at her home in Ancroft Road, Dovecot.

== See also ==
- List of people who disappeared mysteriously
- Chris Clark, British author who writes and produces documentaries about unsolved crimes
- David Smith, convicted killer suspected of being responsible for unsolved murders
