= Belize Ripper =

Unidentified Belizean serial killer

- Other name: "Jack the Butcher"

Details
- Victims: 5
- Span of crimes: 1998–2000
- Country: Belize
- State: Belize District
- Date apprehended: Never apprehended

The Belize Ripper is an unidentified Belizean serial killer responsible for the abduction, rape, and murder of five girls in Belize City between 1998 and 2000. Despite extensive investigation, aided by the FBI and Scotland Yard, nobody was ever convicted of the murders, all of which remain unsolved.

== Murders ==
On September 8, 1998, 13-year-old Sherilee Nicholas, a fifth-grade student at Wesly Upper School in southern Belize City went missing while walking towards her school. The girl's whereabouts remained unclear until October 9, when her body was found in a pool of water near the George Price Highway. She had been stabbed more than 40 times in the head and chest, with one of her arms nearly cut off and face cut open. The body also showed signs of rape, but most ominously, Nicholas was found to be wearing the clothes of another girl who had gone missing just two days prior to her discovery. That girl was 9-year-old Jay Blades, whose skull and a few bones were recovered six months later.

On March 23, 1999, another young girl, 12-year-old Jackie Fern Malic, vanished during recess while playing on her school's playground. Just two days later, her body was found face down in a puddle along a dirt road bordering the area where Nicholas was found. She had been stabbed multiple times and her left arm severed, with indications that she had been run over by a car.

On June 26, 1999, 8-year-old Erica Wills disappeared, but it went unnoticed for three days, as at the time, she was supposed to stay over at some relatives, who in turn thought that she was at home with her family. On July 18, her skeletal remains were found behind a quarry in Gracie Rock, 20 miles west of Belize City. Her body was identified by her mother via a hair band and a Tweety ring, which Erica always wore. By this time, tensions among the populace were rising and demands for the killer to face justice were high, with the victims' families holding candlelight vigils. The police force issued a curfew to all underage children, but despite their efforts, the Ripper struck one final time.

On February 15, 2000, 14-year-old Noemi Hernandez went missing while doing an errand on Mosul Street. Nine days later, her mutilated body was found on a sandy mound along the Belize River, with multiple stab wounds to the face and neck, and several of her body parts missing. Her father identified the body as that of Noemi by the blue jeans she was wearing.

=== Unrelated crimes ===
During the height of the Ripper murders, three other girls were killed in similar circumstances, but were ultimately proven to be unrelated to the case. They were:

- Samantha Gordon (15) - last seen on November 6, 1998, after telling her mother that she was going to visit the old Civic Center with some friends. Two days later, Samantha's nude, bruised body was found floating at sea near Ladyville's Vista Del Mar, with deep stab wounds to the back and knees. In June 1999, four men were charged for her murder and convicted.
- Karen Cruz (10) - in June 1999, Cruz disappeared from the veranda of her Orange Walk Town home. The day after her disappearance, her corpse was found at a stadium two blocks from her home, with signs of being raped. Initially believed to be a Ripper victim, suspicions were later directed towards her next-door uncle, 38-year-old Antonio Baeza, who was reportedly stalking the girl. He was later charged and convicted in her murder.
- Rebecca 'Becky' Gilharry (13) - shortly after Blades' disappearance, on February 15, 1999, Becky's body was found near a Mayan archaeological site in Santa Rita Hill in Corozal Town, after being reported missing the previous day. She had been raped and subsequently strangled. Gilharry was last seen in the company of a family friend, 22-year-old Robert Hill, who was later charged and convicted in her killing.

== Investigation ==
The killings caused widespread panic in the tiny nation, with a national curfew imposed and guards posted at school. In the months following the last murder, several incidents were reported of a man driving a red car and wearing a stocking mask who unsuccessfully attempted to attack and kidnap young girls in Belize City. The assailant was never located. In 2000, pathologist Dr. Mario Estradabran announced a harrowing revelation: prior to being brutally murdered, all of the girls were plied with alcohol and drugs, as well as being tortured. The Ripper had used the same instrument in all five cases, and judging by the precision of the cuts made on the bodies, it is assumed that he either has a medical background or at the very least access to surgical utilities. Authorities also believed that there's a possibility that there might be more than one person involved. At present, no new leads have been reported, and the Belize Ripper murders are considered the country's greatest cold case.

In 2022, the Belize National Forensic Science Service opened a laboratory dedicated to solving the country's cold cases. During an interview with the director of the organization, a reporter confirmed that the evidence relating to the Belize Ripper murders still has usable DNA and it will be scanned.

== Suspects ==
=== Michael Williams ===
The only person charged in any of the killings was a Belize City auto mechanic by the name of Michael Williams, who was a neighbor of victim Jackie Malic. At the time of her murder, the 40-year-old Williams was seen offering a ride to Jackie and her sister Adelma, who both declined. After Jackie disappeared, the police questioned Michael and released him. He was rearrested and charged with murdering Jackie after her body was discovered. While in jail, Williams was also accused of raping a 13-year-old girl a decade prior.

Police began to doubt that Williams was the culprit when the victim Erica Wills disappeared while Williams was still in custody. Additionally, Williams had alibis from his clients and a police officer, and there was no other evidence tying him to the crimes which led to his exoneration.

=== Lonnie David Franklin, Jr. ===
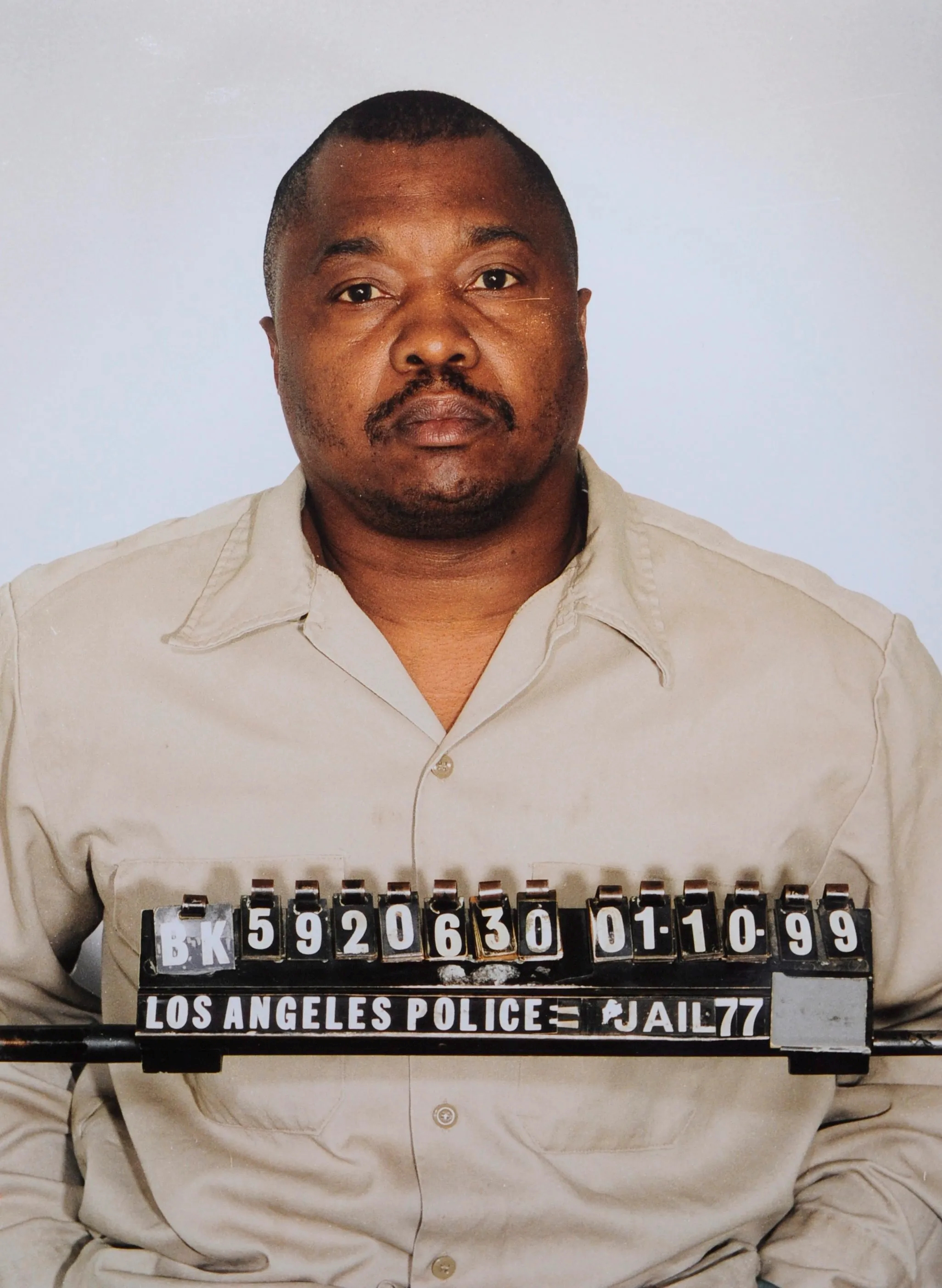
American serial killer Lonnie David Franklin Jr. in a 1999 police mugshot

It was suggested that Lonnie David Franklin Jr., an American serial killer connected to the murders of at least ten sex workers in Los Angeles, California, over several decades, could be a possible suspect. Known as the Grim Sleeper for an apparent 14-year "hibernation" between his known murders, lasting from 1988 to 2002, it is claimed that Franklin had connections to the country via his marriage to Sylvia Castillo, who was from Belize. The break in the Los Angeles murders coincided with Franklin's marriage to Castillo, and one of the victim's aunts allegedly saw him in Belize City at the time of the murders. Additionally, Franklin's van, which he used in the Los Angeles crimes, was later found in Belize, serving as potential circumstantial evidence of his involvement.

Franklin was never charged with the Belize killings, and he died at the San Quentin State Prison in 2020.

== See also ==
- Sharon Carr – infamous killer and repeat offender also from Belize
- List of fugitives from justice who disappeared
- List of unsolved murders in Belize
