= Ports of Belize =

There are several ports of Belize through which boats enter.

== Commercial ports ==
- Port of Big Creek, is a deep water sea port facility in southern Belize. It is situated in Big Creek, Stann Creek District and is primarily used for banana exports. Other products that pass through the port includes shrimp, fertilizer, citrus pellets, and of recently sugar. Some services offered by the port includes tug and barge, stevedoring, property rental, shipping agency, and storage. It is also the port of departure for the oil fields in Spanish Lookout. Belize Natural Energy has an oil storage facility onsite.
- The Commerce Bight Port, about 1.5 miles south of Dangriga, Stann Creek District, is primarily used for citrus exports. As of 2020, it is not operational.
- The Port of Belize is located in Belize City, and is the largest Port in the country where the majority of Belize's commercial imports and exports are processed.

The Commerce Bight Port and Belize City Port are owned and operated by the Port of Belize Ltd. Cruise ships anchor just off shore, and local tenders ferry people from the ships to the city.

== Other ports ==
Sailors can enter from ports at:

- Belize City
- Caye Caulker
- Punta Gorda
- San Pedro Town (on Ambergris Caye)

Entering these ports will require officials to put travelers through customs and other clearances.

== Tourism ==
Tourism is one of the major industries in Belize and government statistics say one in four Belizeans work in this sector. In 2004, over 800,000 tourists visited Belize; projections for 2005 exceed 1,000,000. Carnival Cruise Lines signed an agreement in July 2005 with Belize Ports Ltd. for the construction of a US $50 million cruise terminal next to the Port of Belize Ltd. This project serves as a catalyst for the development of the new Commercial Free Zone and the new Export Processing Zone to be built next to the Cruise Terminal between 2005-2007.

== See also ==
- Transport in Belize
