= List of unsolved murders in the United Kingdom =

This is an incomplete list of unsolved murders in the United Kingdom. It does not include any of the 3,000 or so such murders that took place in Northern Ireland because of the Troubles or any IRA attacks that took place in England. For information about IRA attacks, see The Disappeared, list of bombings during the Troubles (contains Loyalist bombings also) and timeline of the Troubles in Britain. Victims believed or known to have been killed by the same perpetrator(s) are grouped together in the following sub-lists:

- List of unsolved murders in the United Kingdom (before 1970)
- List of unsolved murders in the United Kingdom (1970s)
- List of unsolved murders in the United Kingdom (1980s)
- List of unsolved murders in the United Kingdom (1990s)
- List of unsolved murders in the United Kingdom (2000s)
- List of unsolved killings in the United Kingdom (2010–present)

== See also ==
- List of unsolved deaths
- List of people who disappeared mysteriously
