= El Puerto (newspaper) =

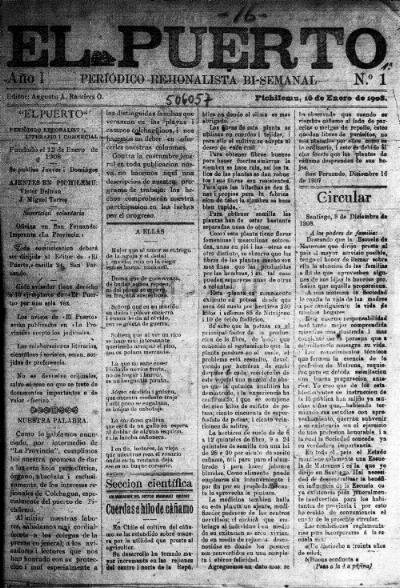
- First edition of El Puerto, dated 16 January 1908
- Type: Biweekly newspaper
- Format: Tabloid
- Owner(s): Augusto A. Ramírez O.
- Publisher: Imprenta La Provincia
- Editor: Augusto A. Ramírez O.
- Staff writers: 2 in Pichilemu
- Founded: 16 January 1908
- Ceased publication: 5 February 1908
- Headquarters: San Fernando (printing house)
- Circulation: Pichilemu, Chile

El Puerto (the port, in Spanish) was a biweekly newspaper published in Pichilemu, Chile, by San Fernando newspaper editor Augusto A. Ramírez O.. El Puerto was only published in three issues: the first on 16 January and the last on 5 February 1908. It was the first newspaper published in the commune of Pichilemu, and aimed to be an "absolute and exclusive organ to the regional interests of Colchagua, especially [those] of the port of Pichilemu." El Puerto included a scientific section written by a physician, chronicles, and literary content such as poems.

== History ==
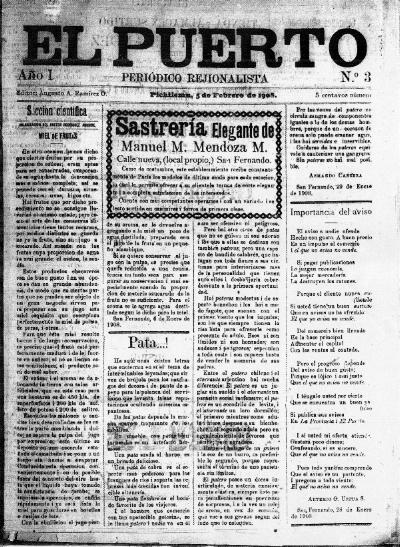
Third number of El Puerto, dated 5 February 1908

Augusto A. Ramírez O., owner of the Imprenta La Provincia printing house of San Fernando and editor of several newspapers, including La Unión (Santa Cruz, 1900–1905), and La Provincia (San Fernando, 1903–1916), founded El Puerto and made a "declaration of release" (declaración de publicación), required by law, to the governor of Colchagua on 12 January 1908. Ramírez published the first edition of the newspaper on 16 January 1908. It was the first newspaper published in the commune of Pichilemu.

Self-announced in its first edition as a biweekly ("published on Thursdays and Sundays"), regionalist newspaper, editor Augusto A. Ramírez stated in an article named Nuestra palabra (Our word) in the first edition of the newspaper that "today [16 January 1908] we comply with our promise to create this journalistic paper, absolute and exclusive organ to the regional interests of Colchagua, especially [those] of the port of Pichilemu." (Note: Original Spanish quote: "[...] cumplimos hoi nuestra promesa de dar a luz esta hoja periodística, órgano, absoluta i esclusivamente, de los intereses rejionales de Colchagua, especialmente del puerto de Pichilemu.") Ramírez also stated that "against general customs in all new publications, we are not making here a description of our program of work: facts will prove our participation in the struggle for progress." (Note: Original Spanish quote: "Contra la costumbre jeneral en toda publicación nueva, no hacemos aquí una descripcion de nuestro programa de trabajo: los hechos comprobarán nuestra participacion en las luchas por el progreso.")

The newspaper published poems, a scientific section by collaborator physician Rodríguez Aguirre, and sections of obituaries, chronicles, social life, and in its third edition a section named Crímenes sensacionales (Sensational crimes).

Only three editions of El Puerto were published. After abandoning El Puerto, Ramírez continued to publish La Provincia in San Fernando and, in later years, published El Progreso (Chimbarongo, February–December 1916) and El Marino, also in Pichilemu, between January and March 1917.

== See also ==
- El Marino (successor to El Puerto)
