= El Marino =

Chilean newspaper published in 1917

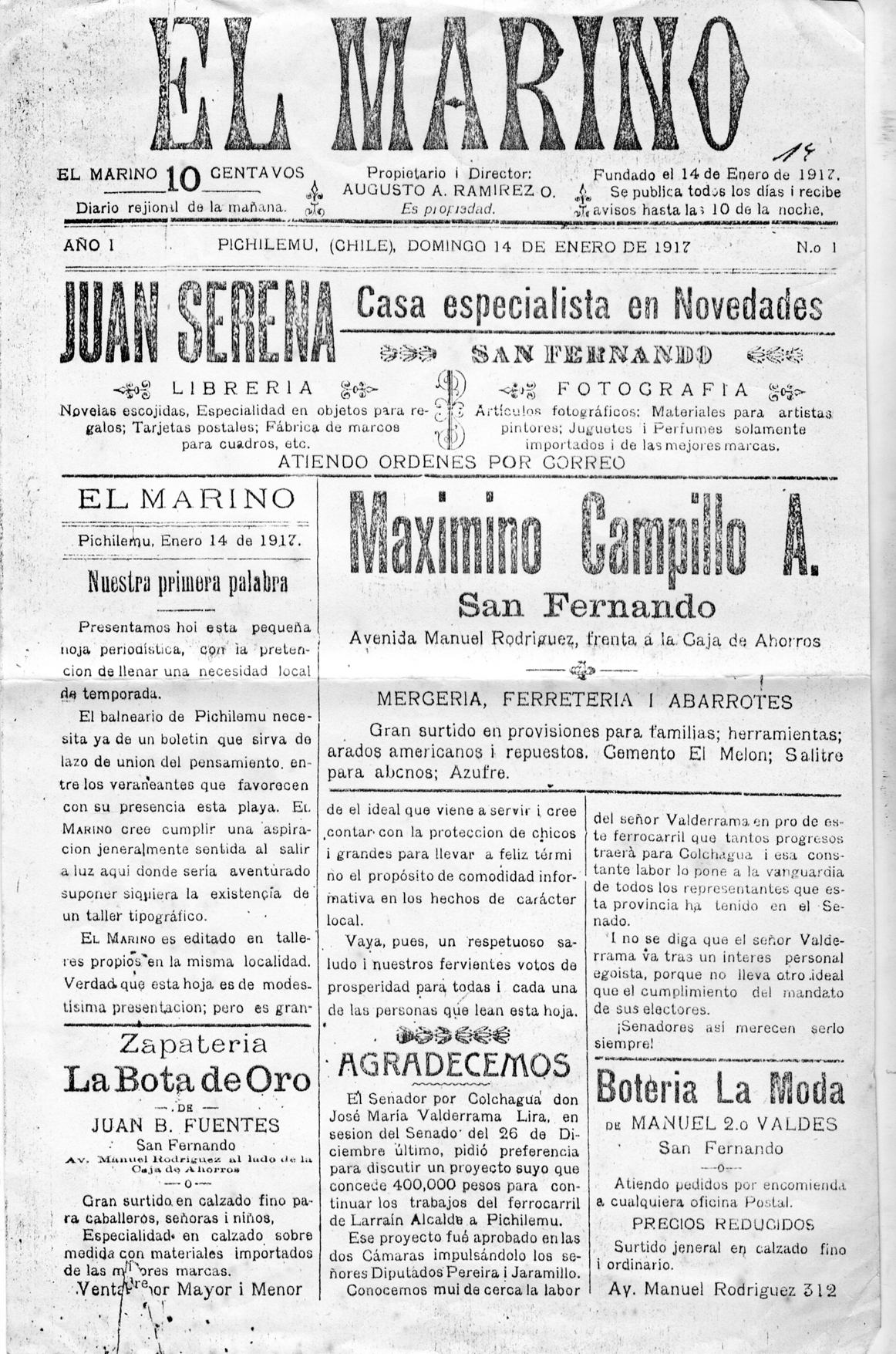
- First edition of El Marino, dated 14 January 1917
- Type: Daily newspaper
- Format: Tabloid
- Founder(s): Augusto Ramírez Olivares
- Publisher: Imprenta de El Marino
- Founded: January 14, 1917
- Language: Spanish
- Ceased publication: 15 March 1917
- Headquarters: Pichilemu, Chile
- Circulation: Pichilemu, Chile

El Marino (the marine, in Spanish) was a Chilean daily newspaper, based in Pichilemu, Cardenal Caro province. It was founded on 14 January 1917 by newspaper editor Augusto Ramírez Olivares, and circulated between January and March 1917.

During its publication, El Marino attempted to convince authorities to provide drinking water to the commune of Pichilemu, and once suggested it to be extracted from a local lake, del Perro. It also documented the visits of prominent Chilean doctors, including Carlos Charlín Correa, who would later become the rector of the University of Chile in 1927. The newspaper also documented the plans of President Juan Luis Sanfuentes to visit Pichilemu. Despite its popularity, El Marino ceased its circulation as Ramírez moved back to San Fernando, his hometown, where he resumed publications of La Provincia, a newspaper he founded in 1903.

== Background ==
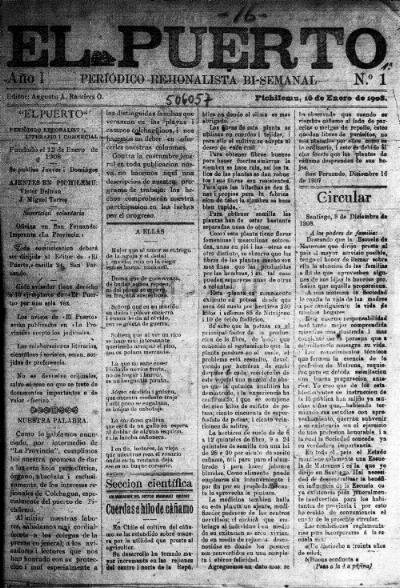
First number of El Puerto (newspaper), dated 16 January 1908

Augusto Ramírez Olivares, who would later become the founder of El Marino, was born in 1873, in the town of Corcolén, currently part of the commune of Malloa, to José Agustín Ramírez Arriagada (1847–?) and Juana Olivarez Quinteros (1847–1883). He was the fourth of seven children; in order of birth date, Alejandro, Arturo, Abrahám, Aliro, Abel, and Ambrosina. His father was the owner of a farm in Roma, San Fernando, and several houses in that city and Pichilemu. Ramírez Olivares married Rosa Camilo Ugarte on 8 September 1885, in the city of San Fernando. The couple had four children: Augusto (who would later go on to become the Chilean Viceconsul to El Salvador), Rosa, Eva and Miguel.

He founded several newspapers in the province of Colchagua, during the early 20th century. These include La Unión of Santa Cruz, published between 1900 and 1905, and La Provincia in San Fernando, published for thirteen years, between 1903 and 1916.

In early 1908, Ramírez founded the first newspaper of Pichilemu, which he named El Puerto, and whose first edition appeared on 16 January 1908. El Puerto was originally announced as a biweekly ("published on Thursdays and Sundays"), regionalist newspaper, with editor Augusto Ramírez Olivares stating in an article named Nuestra palabra (Our word) that "today [16 January 1908] we comply with our promise to create this journalistic paper, absolute and exclusive organ to the regional interests of Colchagua, especially [those] of the port of Pichilemu." (Note: Original Spanish quote: "[...] cumplimos hoi nuestra promesa de dar a luz esta hoja periodística, órgano, absoluta i esclusivamente, de los intereses rejionales de Colchagua, especialmente del puerto de Pichilemu.") Ramírez also stated that "against general customs in all new publications, we are not making here a description of our program of work: facts will prove our participation in the struggle for progress." (Note: Original Spanish quote: "Contra la costumbre jeneral en toda publicación nueva, no hacemos aquí una descripcion de nuestro programa de trabajo: los hechos comprobarán nuestra participacion en las luchas por el progreso.")

El Puerto published poems, a scientific section by collaborator physician Rodríguez Aguirre, and sections of obituaries, chronicles, social life, and sensationalist articles. However, it only survived until March 1908, and just two editions of the newspaper are preserved in the National Library of Chile; at least three editions were published.

After abandoning El Puerto, Ramírez continued to publish La Provincia in San Fernando and, in later years, published El Progreso in Chimbarongo, between February and December 1916, before founding El Marino in Pichilemu.

== History ==
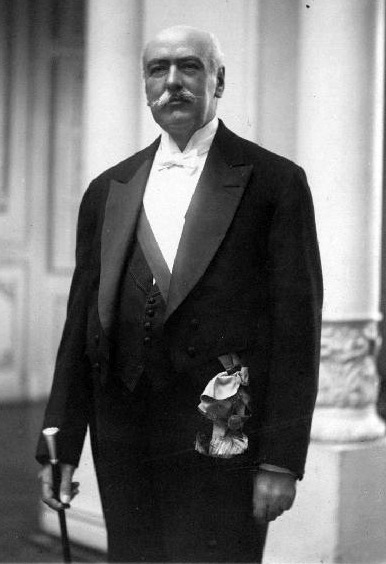
El Marino documented the plans of President Juan Luis Sanfuentes to visit Pichilemu, in January 1917

El Marino first appeared in Pichilemu on 14 January 1917. In an article named Nuestra primera palabra ("Our first word"), Ramírez wrote that the newspaper was published "with the purpose of fulfilling a local necessity of the [summer] season", adding that "the resort of Pichilemu already needs a bulletin to serve as the bond of the thoughts of tourists who favor this beach with their presence". (Note: Original Spanish quote: "Presentamos hoi esta pequeña hoja periodística, con la pretencion de llenar una necesidad local de temporada. El balneario de Pichilemu necesita ya de un boletin que sirva de lazo de union del pensamiento entre los veraneantes que favorecen con su presencia esta playa.") El Marino was printed in a press owned by Ramírez, located in Pichilemu, with paper of "very modest" quality. In El Marino's third edition, published on 21 January 1917, editor Augusto Ramírez wrote that, although he thought the newspaper would be a "failure", it was instead "favored with the applause (support) of distinguished people". (Note: Original Spanish quote: "Verdaderamente, cuando se nos ocurrió la idea de editar esta hojita diaria, sentíamos cierto desaliento i presentíamos un fracaso, acostumbrados a oir elojios solo para las grandes empresas; pero estábamos equivocados; Nuestra modesta obra ha sido favorecida con el aplauso de distinguidas personas a las cuales le agradecemos mui deveras sus conceptos tan honrosos para este diarito i su director.")

Newspapers from San Fernando gave their "good luck wishes" to the Pichilemu daily as it started publications; among these were La Opinión and La Provincia, which stated that El Marino was "very well received" in Pichilemu, adding that "their social informations, its articles, its great typographical presentation, has earned it sincere congratulations". (Note: Original Spanish quote: "Mui bien recibida ha sido la hojita diaria, que por la temporada veraniega, saldrá a luz en el balneario Pichilemu. Sus informaciones sociales, sus artículos; su buena presentación tipográfica, le han merecido sinceras felicitaciones. Basta recordar que, tratándose de la conocida pluma de su director don Augusto Ramirez, eso solo le sirve de recomendacion a su favor; pues este viejo periodista lleva cerca de treinta años de continua labor. Le deseamos éxito.")

The newspaper published, in almost every edition, a Vida social ("Social life") section, which included names of local hotel guests. Among the people mentioned in the Vida social section were doctors Eugenio Díaz Lira, Gregorio Amunátegui, Carlos Charlín Correa (also the rector of the University of Chile in 1927), senator Ismael Valdés Valdés, and deputy Jorge Errázuriz Tagle. It also documented the plans of President Juan Luis Sanfuentes to visit Pichilemu.

El Marino also started a campaign for authorities to provide drinking water to Pichilemu; for example, in March 1917, it suggested water to be extracted from the Laguna del Perro (Del Perro Lake), "which contains a [great] quantity of accumulated water and [well over the altitude of] this town [of Pichilemu]", (Note: Original Spanish quote: "[...] trayéndola de la Laguna del Perro, que tiene una encima cantidad de agua acumulada i que se halla a gran altura sobre el nivel de este pueblo.") asking for the Intendency of Colchagua to study the situation. "These things of public interest, in favor of the salubrity of a town with such a great future, need the dispassionate attention of the public powers", (Note: Original Spanish quote: "Estas cosas de interés público, en pro de la salubridad de un pueblo de inmenso porvenir como este, necesitan la atencion desapasionada de los poderes públicos.") said an article written on the topic.

Despite its popularity, El Marino ceased its publications on 15 March 1917. An article titled Fin de la jornada ("End of the journey") stated that "we are going out with the satisfaction of having obtained a greater result than we expected", (Note: Original Spanish quote: "Llevamos la satisfaccion de haber obtenido un resultado superior a nuestras aspiraciones".) adding that "Pichilemu needs the campaign in favor of the drinking water to be continued". (Note: Original Spanish quote: "Pero Pichilemu necesita que la campaña en pro del agua potable se continue".) Editor Augusto Ramírez resumed the publication of La Provincia in May 1917. Despite El Marino announced it would return on the next summer season, in 1918, it did not appear again in print format. In fact, no other newspapers were published in Pichilemu until January 1944, when Pichilemu was founded by future Mayor Carlos Rojas Pavez, writer José Arraño Acevedo and municipal secretary Miguel Larravide Blanco.

== See also ==
- El Puerto (predecessor of El Marino)
