= José María Gran Cirera =

Spanish priest, missionary and martyr (1945–1980)

Blessed of the Catholic Church
- Born: April 27, 1945; Barcelona
- Died: June 4, 1980; Xeixojbitz, Quiché Department
- Honored in: Catholic Church
- Beatified: April 23, 2021, cathedral in Santa Cruz del Quiché by Pope Francis
- Feast: June 4

José María Gran Cirera (born 27 April 1945 in Barcelona, died 4 June 1980 in Xeixojbitz, Quiché Department) was a Spanish Catholic priest serving in Guatemala, a missionary, member of the Missionaries of the Sacred Heart, martyr, victim of the Guatemalan Civil War, and a Blessed of the Catholic Church.

== Biography ==
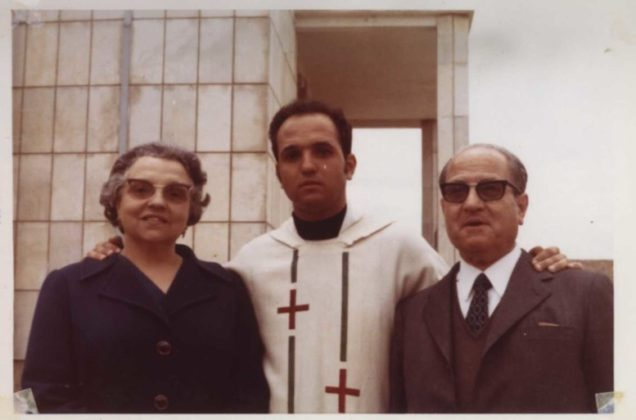
José María Gran Cirera with his parents

He was born in 1945 in Barcelona. In 1966, he joined the Missionaries of the Sacred Heart. On 8 September 1969, he took his religious vows, and on 9 June 1972, he was ordained a priest in Valladolid. In 1975, he embarked on a mission to Guatemala. By 1978, he became the parson in Chajul.

On 4 June 1980, during the Guatemalan Civil War, he was arrested and executed by death squads. On 23 January 2020, Pope Francis signed a decree recognizing his martyrdom, along with that of nine companions, paving the way for their beatification, which took place on 23 April 2021.
