= Murder of Matthew Kitandwe =

2016 murder of British-Ugandan student

On 21 June 2016, Matthew Kitandwe, an 18-year-old British-Ugandan, was murdered outside his home in Wayford Street, Battersea, London. Kitandwe, described as a "promising young footballer", was stabbed to death as he returned from college.

The murder currently remains unsolved and a reward of £10,000 is offered by the independent charity, Crimestoppers, for information leading to the arrest and prosecution of those responsible.

== Background ==
Kitandwe, who lived in the Battersea area of South London, had played for the Uganda national under-17 football team, including at the 2015 Africa Youth Qualifiers. He had also recently been signed to play for Colliers Wood United F.C. He was studying at South Thames College at the time of his murder and attended the Sacred Heart Church, Battersea where he was previously an altar boy. Kitandwe's mother had moved to London after her other son was killed in a car accident in Uganda.

== Murder and investigation ==
Kitandwe was reportedly attacked as he was putting his key in the front door of his flat just before 4.15pm. The London Ambulance Service paramedics fought to save his life before he died in the arms of his mother.

Several people were initially arrested in connection with the murder but they were later released with no further action.

A year on from Kitandwe's murder police are yet to uncover a motive and have found no evidence Kitandwe was linked to gangs or criminal behaviour. Detective Chief Inspector Sam Price told the London Evening Standard that "This appears to have been a senseless attack on a young man and Matthew's family has been left devastated". Police stated they wanted to trace an unknown group of black men seen at around 11am on the day of the murder in a silver car in Wayford Street.

== Reaction ==
The murder attracted media attention in Uganda.

Tributes were paid to Kitandwe from local figures including priests and coaches. His cousin, Wilber Kabugo, said: "I just want to give my humble request to teens...to stop this madness because if you take someone's life it's not reversed."

A vigil was held for Kitandwe in Busega, a neighbourhood of the Ugandan capital of Kampala. He was buried at his family burial grounds in Nabbingo in Uganda.
