= Port of Belize =

Principal port of Belize

- Interactive map of Port of Belize
- Location within Belize

Location
- Country: Belize
- Location: Belize District
- Coordinates: 17°29′55″N 88°11′19″W
- UN/LOCODE: BZBZE

Details
- No. of berths: 3
- Draft depth: 10.2 meters in the anchorage

Statistics
- Website portofbelise.com

The Port of Belize, located in Belize City, is the principal port of Belize and receives nearly all of the country's commercial activity. As of 2025, approximately 95 to 98 per cent of Belize's imports and exports pass through this port, making it an essential component of the national economy and logistics network.

Established in 1978 to replace offshore lightering practices, the port was later expanded and modernised to accommodate container ships. After two decades of private ownership under Port of Belize Ltd., the government of Belize regained ownership of the port in 2023, amid plans to upgrade infrastructure and construct a new bulk terminal. Despite its central role in Belizean trade, the port faces ongoing operational challenges related to limited berthing space, outdated equipment, and restrictions on vessel size due to its shallow draft and narrow dock design.

== Background ==
Belize is the least populous country in Central America; its economy is primarily based on agriculture, with sugar as its largest export commodity. Bananas are the second most important crop and represent the largest source of agricultural employment in the country. Other key export goods include petroleum, industrial minerals, and oil.

To facilitate trade (particularly with Mexico, the United States, the United Kingdom, and the European Union) Belize maintains two major commercial ports – the Port of Belize and the Port of Big Creek – alongside seven smaller ports that handle minor cargo and internal trade. All port operations in the country are regulated by the Belize Port Authority, which is responsible for upholding port security laws and conducting annual facility inspections to ensure compliance with international standards.

== History ==
Prior to 1976, all cargo to and from Belize was lightered at anchorage using barges to transfer goods from bulk carriers to shore. This mid-stream cargo handling practice continued even after the introduction of container ships in 1976. However, recognising the inefficiencies and limitations of this system, the Belizean government pursued the development of a permanent port facility that would allow vessels to dock directly.

The Port of Belize City was established in 1978 to replace lightering operations that were previously conducted offshore. The further development of the port, including the addition of an 800-meter trestle and a pier head for ship berthing, took place under the administration of MP Fred Hunter and opened on 1 July 1980.

In 2002, the government of Belize divested the port's cargo-handling operations to a public limited company, Port of Belize Ltd. (PBL). Under the agreement, the PBL received a 30-year licence to operate and manage port-related services, with specific duties and responsibilities that must be fulfilled.

The government of Belize regained control of the port in December 2023, after acquiring its ownership rights from the private company Ashcroft Alliances. This move followed ongoing internal discussions about modernising port infrastructure to meet the increasing demands of Belize's export sector. As of 2025, there are plans being developed to construct a new bulk terminal to better serve exporters.

== Facilities and equipment ==
The port currently handles around 44,000–45,000 TEUs annually, accounting for 95 to 98 per cent of all imports to and exports from Belize (as of 2025). It has both conventional and container berths, each 25 meters long, and can accommodate ships with drafts of up to 8 metres. Equipment at the port includes two dockside cranes (150–160 million tonnes), two mobile cranes (55–60 million tonnes), one 49-million-tonne capacity reach stacker, two transtainers, and one 5-million-tonne forklift.

The port's container station features twelve reefer stations and cold storage facilities. Additional infrastructure includes fuel storage tanks with a capacity of 50,000 gallons, a 1,955 square metres (21,040 sq ft) dry goods warehouse, and two container yards totalling over 15,000 square metres (160,000 sq ft). The total wharf length is approximately 750 meters.

== Challenges ==
The early years of the port's operation were marked by several challenges, including limited power supply, insufficient cargo handling space, and constrained crane operation due to on-land limitations. These issues prompted infrastructure upgrades such as the addition of cargo sheds, backup generators, and updated equipment.

At present, the port continues to face operational limitations. The narrow-mouthed dock and sharp turns restrict vessel access. The wharf can only accommodate one vessel at a time and lacks the depth needed for large ships, limiting bulk cargo handling capacity. Additionally, ageing cranes and equipment have slowed operations.
