= Killing of Kelvin Odunuyi =

Murder of a teenager in Wood Green, London

Kelvin Odunuyi
- Born: 13 February 1999
- Died: 9 March 2018 (aged 19); Wood Green, Vue cinema London
- Cause of death: Gunshot wound
- Opponent(s): OFB, SinSquad, NPK (Northumberland Park Killers)

On 9 March 2018, Kelvin Odunuyi – also known as Lampz and DipDat – was shot dead outside the Vue cinema in Wood Green, London at approximately 12:30 am.

== Background and death ==
Odunuyi was the son of Afishetu Oniru; his father ran a real estate business in Nigeria. He attended Fulneck School and Heartlands High School.

Prior to his killing, Odunuyi appeared in several videos where he rapped about stabbing and shooting opponents. However, the Evening Standard noted that there were claims that he was not involved in a gang.

Around 12:30 a.m. on 9 March 2018, a moped carrying two people drove near the Vue cinema in Wood Green. One of the occupants fired a gun at Odunuyi; he was declared dead at a hospital two hours later. An article in The Telegraph noted that the death was retaliation for the death of Kwabena "Kobi" Nelson, a former member of the Northumberland Park Killers. After Odunuyi's death, his DNA was found inside the car that crashed into Nelson's car.

== Aftermath ==
Following the death of Odunuyi and other Nigerian youths in the UK, Abike Dabiri, an assistant to the President of Nigeria on foreign affairs, stated that the increase of Nigerian deaths in the UK "was worrisome and disturbing." Odunuyi's death was mentioned in a song by rappers Tugga and Trills, which was seen by Odunuyi's family. The song chanted: “Park Lane bopping, the opps dem dropping, come here, I got you a coffin. 12 gauge long like Kelvin’s coffin.”

He was also mentioned in a song by OFB rapper SJ.

A 21-year-old was arrested in connection with the shooting on suspicion of murder; he was later released.

In 2021, a video showing a re-creation of Odunuyi's death in a Grand Theft Auto game was described as appalling by his family.
