= Augusto Ramírez Monasterio =

Guatemalan Catholic priest

Blessed Augusto Rafael Ramírez Monasterio
- Honored in: Catholic Church

Augusto Rafael Ramírez Monasterio (Note: In this Spanish name, the first or paternal surname is Ramírez and the second or maternal family name is Monasterio.) (5 November 1937 – 7 November 1983) was a Guatemalan Catholic priest belonging to the Order of Friars Minor.

== Murder ==
In June 1983, after providing pastoral care to a peasant identified later as Fidel Coroy, who was a catechist, had ties to the Guerilla Army of the Poor (EGP) and was seeking to take advantage of government amnesty and regularize his status with the authorities, Ramírez Monasterio accompanied him to the police, where they were both arrested and abducted. They were taken to a military base and beaten, with the priest singled out in an attempt to get him to break the Seal of the Confessional. He was later released along with Coroy.

Later, on 7 November 1983, he was again abducted and, while trying to escape the vehicle they were forcibly transporting him in, he was shot and killed.

== Beatification ==
He was beatified by the Catholic Church on 7 November 2026. Cardinal Francisco Robles Ortega, archbishop of Guadalajara, presided in the Mass on behalf of Pope Leo XIV.
