= List of homicides in Massachusetts =

This is a list of homicides in Massachusetts. The list features only notable homicides that have Wikipedia articles of their own.

The list is divided into three categories:

- 1. Multiple homicides, events in which more than one person was murdered, such as school shootings or familicides.
- 2. Serial killers, individuals who murdered at least three people within Massachusetts.
- 3. Single homicides, incidents involving only one fatality.

== Multiple homicides ==
Listed in reverse chronological order.

Incident	Location	Date	Deaths	Injured	Total	Description
Boston Marathon bombing	Boston	April 15–19, 2013	6 (Note: Including co-perpetrator Tamerlan Tsarnaev and a police officer who died from his injuries in 2014)	281	287	Islamic terrorism: Dzhokhar and Tamerlan Tsarnaev carried out a bombing at the 117th Boston Marathon and fatally shot a police officer three days later while on the run. Tamerlan was killed during their fugitive period, while Dzhokhar was apprehended and sentenced to death; he is currently incarcerated at ADX Florence.
2011 Waltham triple murder	Waltham	c. September 11, 2011	3	0	3	Three men had their throats slashed in an apartment. Tamerlan Tsarnaev (co-perpetrator of the Boston Marathon bombing) and Ibragim Todashev were suspects in the case but were both killed in 2013.
Edgewater Technology shooting	Wakefield	December 26, 2000	7	0	7	Shooting: Michael McDermott killed seven of his co-workers at Edgewater Technology. He is incarcerated at Old Colony Correctional Center as of 2025.
Brookline clinic shootings	Brookline	December 30, 1994	2	5	7	Shooting: John Salvi, a Catholic anti-abortion extremist, carried out attacks at two abortion clinics. He committed suicide in prison in 1996.
1992 Bard College at Simon's Rock shooting	Great Barrington	December 14, 1992	2	4	6	Shooting: Student Wayne Lo carried out a shooting at Bard College at Simon's Rock, killing one student and one professor. He is currently serving two life sentences.
Boston Chinatown massacre	Boston	January 12, 1991	5	6	11	Shooting: A gang-related attack in which five men were killed execution-style at a gambling den in Boston's Chinatown. Two men were convicted for the massacre, while a third suspect remains a fugitive as of 2025.
Blackfriars Massacre	Boston	June 28, 1978	5	0	5	Shooting: Mob-related massacre that occurred in the Blackfriars Pub in Downtown Boston. The attack, which is believed to have been a robbery-gone-wrong, remains officially unsolved.
Borden murders	Fall River	August 4, 1892	2	0	2	Axe murders: Married couple Andrew and Abby Borden were murdered in their home. Andrew's daughter (and Abby's stepdaughter), Lizzie Borden, was infamously tried and acquitted in the case.
Boston Massacre	Boston	March 5, 1770	5	6	11	Shooting: A confrontation during the American Revolution in which a crowd was opened fire on by British soldiers.

== Serial killers ==
Serial killers who operated solely within or had at least three victims within Massachusetts. Listed in reverse chronological order.

Perpetrator	Location	Date	Deaths	Description
Stewart Weldon	Springfield	2017–2018	3	Weldon murdered three women and hid their bodies on his property and is also suspected to be responsible for a series of rapes. He is currently incarcerated at Old Colony Correctional Center.
Main South Woodsman	Worcester	2002–2004	3–5	Unidentified serial killer who targeted sex workers.
Alfred Gaynor	Springfield	1995–1998	9	Drug-addicted serial murderer and rapist. Gaynor is currently an inmate at Souza-Baranowski Correctional Center.
New Bedford Highway Killer	New Bedford	1988–1989	11	Unidentified serial killer who targeted sex workers.
Michael Sumpter	Greater Boston	1969–1973	3	Raped and strangled three women; identified posthumously.
Tony Costa	Truro	1968–1969	4+	Murdered and dismembered at least four women; committed suicide behind bars in 1974.
Kenneth Harrison	Boston	1967–1969	4	Serial killer nicknamed "The Giggler" due to the perpetrator, Kenneth Harrison, calling the police after each murder and giggling. He committed suicide in prison in 1989.
Boston Strangler	Multiple counties	1962–1964	13	An unidentified serial murderer of women. Rapist Albert DeSalvo confessed to the killings, which remain mostly unsolved, before he was murdered in prison in 1973. In 2013, DNA evidence linked him to the final victim.
Jane Toppan	Multiple counties	1895–1901	12–100+	Nurse who poisoned patients. After her apprehension, Toppan was committed to Taunton State Hospital, where she died in 1938.
Sarah Jane Robinson	Boston	1881–1886	8–11	Serial killer who poisoned her relatives; died behind bars in 1906.
Thomas W. Piper	Boston	1873–1875	2–3	Convicted for the murder of two girls and confessed to a third. Piper was executed by hanging in 1876.

== Single homicides ==
Listed in reverse chronological order.

Incident	Location	Date	Solved?	Ref.
Murder of Vanessa Marcotte, 27	Princeton	August 7, 2016	Yes	
Murder of Bella Bond, 2	Boston	c. May–June 2015	Yes	
Murder of Odin Lloyd, 27	North Attleborough	June 17, 2013	Yes	
Murder of Rebecca Riley, 4	Hull	December 13, 2006	Yes	
Murder of Christa Worthington, 45	Truro	January 6, 2002	Yes	
Killing of Molly Bish, 16	Warren	June 27, 2000	No	
Murder of Deanna Cremin, 17	Somerville	March 30, 1995	No	
Murder of Holly Piirainen, 10	Sturbridge	August 5, 1993	No	
Murder of Kristin Lardner, 21	Boston	May 20, 1992	Yes	
Murder of Melissa Ann Tremblay, 11	Lawrence	September 11, 1988	No	
Murder of Tiffany Moore, 12	Boston	August 19, 1988	Yes	
Assassination of Orhan Gündüz	Somerville	May 4, 1982	No	
Murder of Andrew Puopolo, 21	Boston	November 15, 1976	Yes	
Murder of Ruth Marie Terry, 37	Body found in Provincetown	c. July 1974	Yes	
Murder of Danny Croteau, 13	Chicopee	April 14, 1972	Yes	
Murder of John J. McCabe, 15	Lowell	September 27, 1969	Yes	
Murder of Edward Deegan, 35	Chelsea	March 12, 1965	Yes	
Murder of George Parkman, 59	Boston	November 23, 1849	Yes	
Murder of Elizabeth Fales, 18	Dedham	May 18, 1801	Yes	
Murder of Christopher Seider, 11	Boston	February 22, 1770	Yes	
Murder of John Newcomen	Plymouth Colony	1630	Yes	
