= Puopolo =

Puopolo is an Italian surname. Notable people with the surname include:

- Andrew Puopolo (died 1976), American football player and murder victim
- Paul Puopolo (born 1987), Australian rules footballer
