= Peter Manso =

American writer and journalist (1940–2021)

- Born: December 22, 1940; New York City
- Died: April 7, 2021 (aged 80); Truro, Massachusetts
- Occupations: Writer and journalist
- Spouses: Susan Beges; Anna Avellar (m. 2003)

Peter Manso (December 22, 1940 – April 7, 2021) was an American writer and journalist known for definitive biographies on Jackie Stewart, Norman Mailer and Marlon Brando.

He gained particular notoriety as an interviewer. His 1970 book Vroom!! conversations with the Grand Prix champions was composed entirely from transcripts of his talks with ten Formula One drivers.

He later had interviews published regularly in Penthouse Magazine as well as Playboy (and its subsidiary Oui), Car and Driver, Premiere and The Guardian. Subjects included Arnold Schwarzenegger, Leonard Peltier, Al Unser Jr., Roy Cohn, Ed Koch, Oliver Stone, Sam Donaldson, Mark Fuhrman, Roger Penske and Peter O’Toole. Schwarzenegger's admission of group sex and drugs resurfaced when he ran for governor of California. Koch's comments that suburbs were “sterile” and rural America “a joke” is attributed to having cost him the New York governor race.

Manso also wrote articles for Vanity Fair, Boston Magazine, Entertainment Weekly, The Sunday Times, Los Angeles Magazine, San Francisco Chronicle Magazine and Politico. Many were translated into French for Paris Match.

Peter Bloch, editor of Penthouse, wrote, “In truth, there were no others like him. He not only was the best interviewer in the business but he was a vivid and evocative prose stylist and an intrepid and dogged researcher (I remember his joy at tracking down Marlon Brando's fourth-grade teacher).”

His penchant for interviews and research shaped later books he wrote. His 765-page Mailer, His Life and Times was pieced together from manuscripts of more than 200 interviews. He conducted 750 for the 1,160-page Brando: The Biography.

== Early life and education ==
Manso was born in Manhattan, the son of Leo Manso, a book illustrator and abstract painter, and Blanche (Rosenberg) Manso, an art dealer. Leo designed book covers for releases by Dashiell Hammett, Ian Fleming, John Steinbeck and Agatha Christie. Robert Motherwell called him “one of collage's masters.” His work is in permanent collections at the Whitney Museum, the Metropolitan Museum of Art, the Provincetown Art Association and Museum and the Museum of Modern Art. Blanche collected Indian and Nepalese art, her own collections exhibited in New York and California.

Peter was raised in New York City and summered in Provincetown, where his parents became intimately involved in the art community, his mother opening an arts store and his father running a summer workshop from 1958 to 1976 in collaboration with New York University. In 1951, the family purchased a home at 592 Commercial Street, which painter Marsden Hartley and journalists John Reed and Louise Bryant had once lived.

At age 16, Manso graduated from New York's High School of Music and Art, later obtaining a bachelor's degree at Antioch College and a Masters at Johns Hopkins University. He also taught English Literature at Rutgers University and University of California, Berkeley.

== Mailer mayoral campaign ==
In 1969, Manso wrote position papers for Mailer's campaign for New York City Mayor. Mailer, running with Jimmy Breslin, called for the City to become the 51st state, a ban on private cars and a World Series for stickball.” The papers became his first book, Running Against the Machine: A Grass Roots Race for the New York Mayoralty.

== Cars and auto racing ==
In 1970, the same year Vroom!! was released, Manso began working with Stewart on Faster! A Racer's Diary. Stewart had won the Formula One World Championship in 1969 and 1971 but 1970 was one of his most difficult years, losing two friends to car crashes. Both books proved popular in racing circles. In 2008, Autoweek listed them among the best car books of the past 50 years.

In 1974, he was writer for the film One by One, which documented the dangers of Formula One racing. It was re-released in 1978 as The Quick and the Dead and again as Champions Forever: The Formula One Drivers.

Manso, whose personal driving preference was Porsches, also wrote about autos for Penthouse.

In 2021, he was honored by the Motorsport Hall of Fame “for being a superb motorsport journalist.”

== Mailer, His Life and Times (1985) ==
Manso long considered Mailer a mentor having met the already celebrity author in 1959 while a junior at Antioch and, ten years later, working on his mayoral campaign. He also served as godfather to Mailer's son Michael Mailer.

In 1983, Manso and Mailer bought a house in Provincetown with collateral from Roy Cohn, who also lived on the property. For two summers, Manso and his partner Ellen Hawkes, Mailer and his wife Norris Church and Mailer's children lived together while Manso worked on the biography. Instead of narrating it himself, he edited clips from 141 people he listed as contributors to tell Mailer's story. He said he did this partly to “avoid any problems with my housemate-subject.” He would add his own narration in an afterword when the book was re-released in 2008. The personality clashes in the home proved fierce, even making news in the New York Post at the time, and Manso and Hawkes moved out as the book was finished. Manso and Mailer never reconciled.

Although Mailer wrote notes on the last two manuscripts and signed off on the book, he dismissed it after it was released and was increasingly critical of it as time passed. The two men warred in the media and within Provincetown when Manso's Ptown: Art, Sex, and Money on the Outer Cape was released 18 years later.

The book was a success. "Try dipping into Mr. Manso's interviews without at once becoming addicted....You can't,” wrote The New York Times. “Mostly the book is grand gossip, a sort of Portable Hamptons. Everyman's own private literary soiree for a long afternoon in the hammock,” wrote Time. Mark Harris of the Los Angeles Times Book Review, in noting that Manso had “raced about the country for four years asking people who knew Mailer to tell his tape recorder everything,” had produced a book that “becomes bigger than anyone, bigger even than Mailer.” Robin Macauley of the Chicago Sun Times called it “wonderfully Maileresque.”

== Brando: The Biography (1994) ==
Manso followed the success of the Mailer biography by working eight years on one for Brando, the results coming in at 1,160 pages, 72 of them footnotes. Although this time he narrated it in a more traditional manner, like the Mailer book he listed key interviewees in the notes, 561 of them.

As with all four of his final nonfiction books, there was a connection to the tip of Cape Cod with a chapter of Brando's life in Provincetown detailed.

Reviews were mostly positive. “As mammoth as Brando himself...To Manso's credit, the book is neither a hatchet job nor a bronzing,” wrote Kirkus Reviews. “Marlon Brando emerges in Peter Manso's massive biography as a more complex, but also more sympathetic, figure than the one he revealed in his own memoir ,” weighed in The Boston Globe. “Monumental...pursued with the diligence and the desire for completeness that we associate with loving labors,” wrote The New York Review of Books.

== Ptown: Art, Sex, and Money on the Outer Cape (2003) ==
Using each chapter as a snapshot of different aspects of Provincetown, Manso chronicled the town's history and its peoples while also addressing ongoing gentrification. One theme that emerged was the town, once a haven for writers and artists with a Portuguese fishing community as a year-round foundation, had changed to one where people talked about real estate and money. The book drew condemnation from subsections of the community who saw it as an attack on wealthy gays.

The San Francisco Examiner wrote, “At the risk of wrongdoing being called homophobic, Manso examines the exclusionary policies used by affluent gays to make Provincetown wholly their own.” Konch Magazine wrote one of the touching aspects in the book was how much “sheer human kindness and volunteerism” it documented, adding a caveat that “positive portraits of gay people are featured prominently throughout.” John W. Thomas of Life in Provincetown, while not agreeing with Manso's conclusions, said the book “has done something that nothing else has been able to do. It has forced us to talk with each other about what is really happening to us.”

The book was a number one bestseller in New England.

== Reasonable Doubt: The Fashion Writer, Cape Cod and the Trial of Christopher McCowen (2011) ==
Manso had previously covered the Christian Brando trial for his Brando book and played a background role in the O.J. Simpson trial being the person who informed attorneys about the existence of tapes of racist comments made by Los Angeles police detective Mark Furhman. In the trial of Christopher McCowen he would, as The Boston Globe wrote in a headline, take “center stage” at times. He admitted early on that he was working with the defense.

In November 2006, McCowen, an African American, was convicted for raping and fatally stabbing fashion writer Christa Worthington. Two months after the trial, in an article in Boston Magazine, Manso revealed three jurors felt they had made a mistake, citing racial tension and pressure in the jury room. After the three signed affidavits detailing several incidents, trial Judge Gary Nickerson called jurors back for two days of questioning.

Then, in the summer of 2007, Manso informed the Court the man McCowen had claimed stabbed Worthington, Jeremy Frazier, had previously been charged with pulling a knife on two tourists. District Attorney Michael O’Keefe, whose office handled the case, had failed to turn the file over to McCowen's defense team.

While awaiting Nickerson's ruling on a defense motion for a new trial, in December, 2007, police responded to a burglar alarm in Manso's Truro home. Inside police discovered three unregistered firearms, two with permits expired. O’Keefe, who Manso had been critical of on CourtTV throughout the trial, levied 12 charges, including felonies, that could have imprisoned the author for 10 years. The charges were dismissed two and a half years later but as an indicted felon he was unable to gain access to McCowen in prison until his record was sealed, which came after the book was released.

In April, 2008, Nickerson ruled against a new trial.

The Washington Post wrote of the book, “Rarely has a homicide trial been refracted so clearly through the prism of those who engineered it.” USA Today said it was “a troubling and disturbing look inside the American judicial system.” In a mixed review, The Boston Globe called it “an important book for anyone who cares about the criminal justice system” but added McCowen was “never truly made human” in not hearing directly from him. A negative review by Dwight Garner in The New York Times, calling the book “a disaster, at once lumpen and bonkers” brought a 7oo-word response by Manso to the paper. The Atlantic and Women's Wear Daily covered the saga between Garner and Manso as a literary war.

== Bully. Coward. Victim. The Story of Roy Cohn (2019) ==
Manso's accounts and tape recordings of Cohn, who Manso had interviewed for Penthouse and lived next door to in Provincetown, led him to co-produce a 2019 documentary for HBO. The film was directed by Ivy Meeropol, granddaughter of Julius and Ethel Rosenberg, who Cohn prosecuted.

== Death ==
Manso died of a heart attack at his Truro home on April 7, 2021.

He had been writing a book on Berkeley, California using a similar structure as Ptown. He, and his wife, Anna Avellar, had split time between homes in Truro and Berkeley and he also lived in the city from 1963 to 1969.

He also was working on a documentary with Michael Mailer about Ruth Marie Terry also known as Lady of the Dunes, a formerly unidentified murder victim found in Provincetown in 1974.

== Bibliography (selected) ==
- Running Against the Machine: a Grass Roots Race for the New York Mayoralty. Doubleday and Company, Inc. 1969.
- Vroom!! conversations with the Grand Prix champions. Pitman. 1970. ISBN 9780273314844. (with Jackie Stewart)
- Faster! A Racer's Diary. Farrar, Straus and Giroux. 1972. ISBN 9780374153700.
- The Shadow of the Moth: A Novel of Espionage with Virginia Woolf. St. Martin's Press. 1983. ISBN 9780312714147.(with Ellen Hawkes)
- Mailer, His Life and Times. Simon and Schuster. 1985. ISBN 9780671442644. OCLC 11523648.
- Brando: The Biography. Hyperion. 1994. ISBN 9780786860630. OCLC 30544545.
- American Girl: The Tragic Life and Times of Margaux Hemingway. ReganBooks. 1998. ISBN 9780060392154. (with Ellen Hawkes)
- Ptown: Art, Sex, and Money on the Outer Cape. Scribner. 2002. ISBN 978-0-7432-0094-3. OCLC 49611087.
- Reasonable Doubt: The Fashion Writer, Cape Cod, and the Trial of Chris McCowen. Atria Books. 2011. ISBN 978-1-4391-8744-9. OCLC 893122975.
