= Leo Manso =

American painter and collage artist

- Born: April 15, 1914; New York City
- Died: February 5, 1993 (aged 78); New York City
- Other name: Leo Mansowitz
- Occupations: Painter, educator

Leo Manso (April 15, 1914 – February 5, 1993) was an abstract expressionist painter and collage artist known for his book illustrations and innovative modernist paintings.

== Early life ==
Manso was born Leo Joseph Mansowitz in New York City. He studied at the National Academy of Design, the Educational Alliance, and the New School for Social Research. He studied art history as well as painting.

== Career ==
Manso lived in New York City and spent summers in Provincetown, Massachusetts. He helped to develop Provincetown as a major American art colony in the 1940s. He was part of the "Forum 49" exhibition there with Hans Hofmann and Jackson Pollock, and co-founded Gallery 256. In 1958, with Victor Candell, he established the Provincetown Workshop, a summer school that attracted students from all around the world. It closed in 1976. Manso believed in working collectively for exhibiting and promotion with other artists, saying, "I’ve always been involved in cooperative groups because I believe that artists have to take their destiny into their own hands. Leaving it to dealers is a lot of garbage."

Manso began his painting work with acrylics, which he applied directly to sized canvases which created a thick impasto effect. He later switched to acrylics as a medium for collage using many other materials (paper, metal, wood) which he would sometimes soak in acrylics as he applied them to his canvases. Manso believed that the use of new materials enabled him to discover new truths.

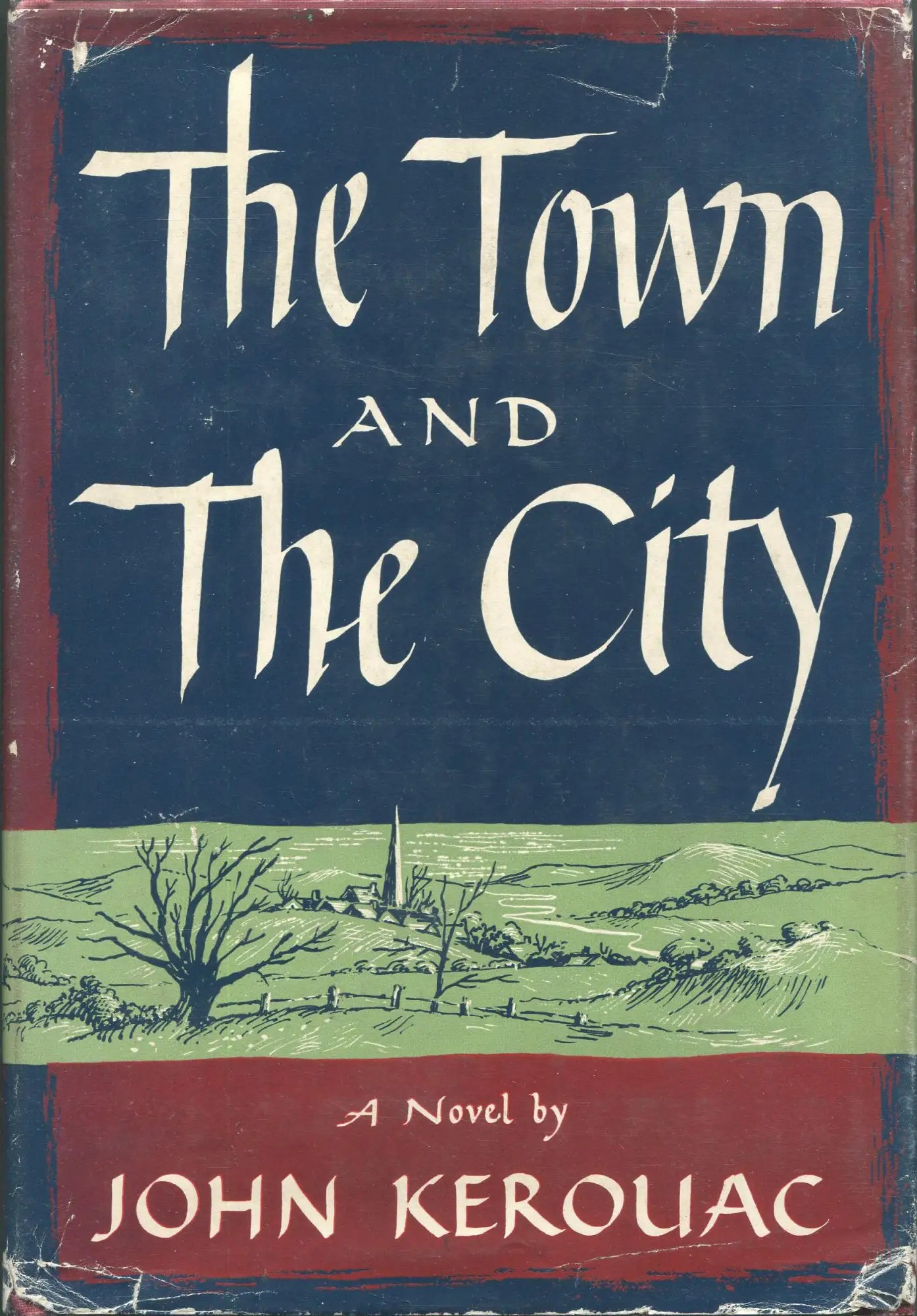
Town and the City cover designed by Manso

Manso worked at Simon & Schuster and illustrated a large number of Pocket Books covers between 1943 and 1945. He was considered the most distinctive artist to work at Pocket Books in the pre-1945 era. Along with other illustrators, he founded the Book Jacket Designers Guild to support professional standards in paperback book covers. They held annual events "to advocate the production of quality covers."

Manso joined the faculty of the Art Students League in 1976, where he taught for his entire life. He also taught at Columbia University and New York University. He was artist-in-residence at Dartmouth College in 1985.

== Death and legacy ==
Manso died of heart failure in Manhattan on February 5, 1993. With his wife Blanche (Rosenberg) Manso, he had two sons, the journalist Peter Manso and Victor Manso.

Manso's work was exhibited widely in his lifetime, and his works are in the permanent collections of the Museum of Modern Art, the Whitney, the Hirshhorn, the Museum of Fine Arts in Boston, and the Glicenstein Museum in Safed, Israel.
