= Murder of Deanna Cremin =

American teenage murder victim (1978–1995)

Deanna Cremin
- Born: Deanna J. Cremin; March 26, 1978; Somerville, Massachusetts, U.S.
- Died: March 30, 1995 (aged 17); Somerville, Massachusetts, U.S.
- Cause of death: Strangulation
- Occupations: High school student, employee of Star Market

Deanna J. Cremin (March 26, 1978 – March 30, 1995) was a 17-year-old American girl from Somerville, Massachusetts, found sexually assaulted and strangled to death near her home. No charges have ever been filed. The case deeply shocked the local community, and a $70,000 reward is being offered for evidence leading to an arrest and prosecution.

== Biography ==
Cremin was a student of Somerville High School. She did volunteer work at Somerville Cable Access Television, worked with third graders at the Child Development Program at her school, and worked at Star Market.

== Murder ==
On March 29, 1995, Deanna Cremin followed her usual Wednesday routine of going out with friends and visiting her boyfriend. Her curfew was 10 pm; when she was not home by midnight, her mother tried unsuccessfully to reach her on her pager. Her boyfriend, considered the last person to see Cremin alive, admits walking her home that night, but says he left her halfway, which, according to Deanna's mother, was unusual, as he had always walked her all the way home prior to that night.

== Discovery ==
Cremin's body was found four days after her 17th birthday, at 8 a.m. on March 30, behind a senior housing complex, less than a block from her home. She was found by two children she babysat for who were taking a shortcut on their way to school. Her body was lying on its back, and mostly undressed. She had been strangled and sexually assaulted.

An autopsy revealed she had been strangled, and her murder remains unsolved.

== Investigation ==
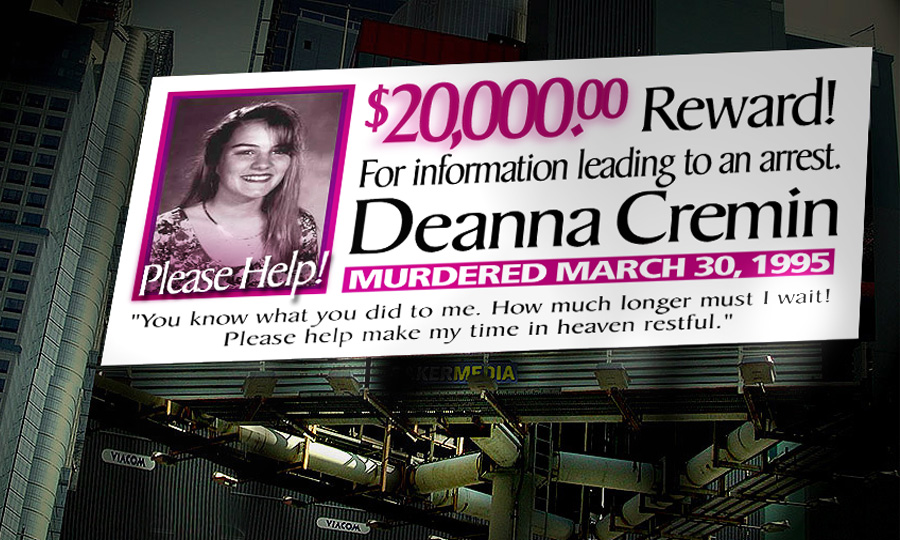
Deanna Cremin reward; increased to $50,000.00 as of 2014

Police identified three men as persons of interest in the crime: Cremin's teenage boyfriend; a Somerville firefighter more than twice Cremin's age, said to have been fixated on her; and a third adult man, later imprisoned at Massachusetts Correctional Institution – Cedar Junction. No charges were filed. In 2005, Middlesex district attorney Martha Coakley announced new forensic evidence had been found with procedures unavailable in 1995, raising hope of progress in the case, but again no charges were pressed.

In 2009, Middlesex district attorney Gerard Leone stated that the murder would be solved, but law enforcement needed witnesses who had remained silent to come forward. The Cremin family erects a billboard each year since her death, to offer a reward for information about the killer. At the bottom of the billboard, a quote reads: "You know what you did to me. How much longer must I wait! Please help make my time in heaven restful." The reward has grown from $10,000 in 1995 to $20,000 by 2005, to $50,000 in 2014.

== Aftermath ==
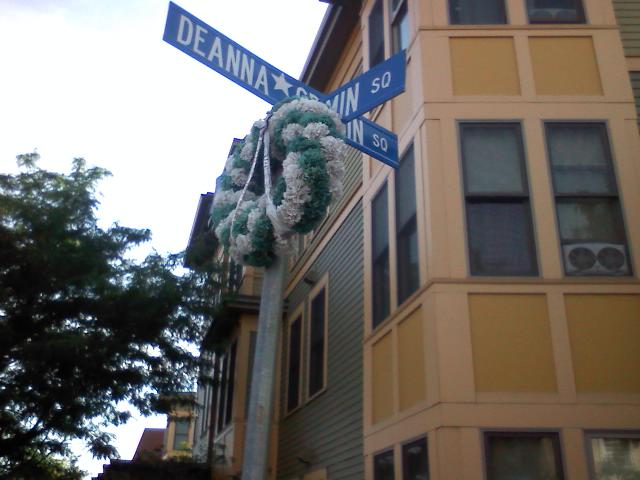
Deanna Cremin Square in Somerville.

A thousand mourners attended Cremin's funeral at St. Polycarp's church, including a procession with 150 vehicles.

Trees and benches around the city have been dedicated to Deanna Cremin. The Deanna Cremin Reward Scholarship is a $500 annual award given to one recipient currently attending the Child Development Program at Somerville High School.

In the summer of 1995, Deanna Cremin Square was dedicated to her. The idea was proposed by a friend, Danielle Shute. The square is located on the corner of Jaques Street and Temple Street, Cremin's neighborhood.42.394343°N 71.092041°W It is also located near St. Polycarp's Church, where her funeral was held. The family places a new wreath on it every year. In 2016, the former Otis playground, on the corner of Otis and Dana streets, was renamed the Cremin playground in her memory. It has improved security features including lighting and cameras.

A friend of Deanna's published a poem titled "Waiting For Your Return" in Teen Ink magazine. Willie Alexander, former member of The Velvet Underground, wrote a song about her death titled "Who Killed Deanna", which appeared on his albums The East Main Street Suite (1999) and The Dog Bar Yacht Club (2005).

Years later, the case has not been forgotten. On October 1, 2006, hundreds of people wearing shirts reading "Justice for Deanna" marched through her old neighborhood seeking action on the case. The case has been repeatedly featured on WFXT television "New England's Unsolved", through 2009. On March 30, 2013, hundreds of supporters retraced her last path through the streets of Somerville's Winter Hill neighborhood. On March 31, 2014, the Mayor of Somerville announced a $50,000 reward to help find the people, or person behind Deanna Cremin's murder. In 2015, on the twentieth anniversary of the murder, the case continued to receive national coverage, Middlesex County district attorney Marian T. Ryan was still asking anyone with information to contact her office, and the reward for information had reached $70,000.

== See also ==
- List of homicides in Massachusetts
- List of solved missing person cases: 1950–1999
- List of unsolved murders (1980–1999)
