= Murder of Melissa Ann Tremblay =

1988 child murder in Massachusetts

Melissa Ann Tremblay
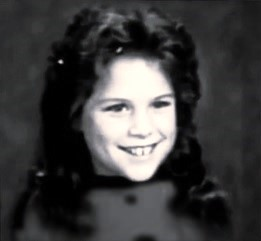
- Melissa Tremblay, pictured in 1987
- Born: March 1, 1977; Massachusetts, U.S.
- Died: September 11, 1988 (aged 11); Lawrence, Massachusetts, U.S.
- Cause of death: Multiple stab wounds to torso. Slash wound to throat.
- Body discovered: September 12, 1988; Boston and Maine Railroad, Lawrence, Massachusetts, U.S. 42.68638°N 71.15412°W (approximate)
- Resting place: Pine Grove Cemetery, Salem, New Hampshire, U.S. 42.79214°N 71.19898°W (approximate)
- Occupation: Student
- Known for: Victim of unsolved child murder
- Height: 5 ft 0 in (1.52 m)

The murder of Melissa Ann Tremblay is an unsolved child murder which occurred in Lawrence, Massachusetts, on the afternoon of September 11, 1988, in which an eleven-year-old girl from Salem, New Hampshire, was beaten, then murdered by three stab wounds to her torso before her body was intentionally left upon a section of the Boston and Maine Railroad. Her partially severed body was discovered beneath a freight train by a railroad employee one day after her murder. Despite exhaustive contemporary efforts, the investigation into Tremblay's murder gradually became a cold case, although her case remained open.

Via advancements in DNA analysis, skin and flesh scrapings discovered beneath Tremblay's fingernails were considered a sufficient match to a retired prison guard from Alabama who had lived in Chelmsford, Massachusetts, at the time of the murder and who had always been considered a suspect in Tremblay's murder; this individual was arrested and charged with Tremblay's murder on April 26, 2022.

This suspect would be tried for Tremblay's murder on two occasions—in each instance entering a plea of not guilty. The jury at the suspect's first trial were unable to reach a decision due to being deadlocked as to his guilt, resulting in the judge declaring a mistrial; the jury at his second trial would inform the judge after six days of deadlocked deliberations they considered the suspect not guilty.

== Early life ==
Melissa Ann Tremblay was born in Massachusetts on March 1, 1977. Approximately one month after her birth, she was adopted by Janet and Robert Tremblay, and was raised in Salem, New Hampshire. Tremblay had no siblings and grew into a friendly and confident child with a love for singing, fashion, and music—in particular Madonna and New Kids on the Block—and who, by 1988, had grown her brown hair long and which she wore in the contemporary feathered fashion. Tremblay was known as "Missy" to family and friends alike and, although popular among her peers at Lancaster School, was diagnosed as hyperactive in the mid-1980s and was known to have a rebellious streak. She was also active in the local chapter of the Boys & Girls Clubs of America—frequently spending up to five evenings a week at this club. While attending this club, Tremblay developed aspirations to become a secretary.

Tremblay's parents separated in 1986 when the child was nine years old, with Janet retaining custody of their only child, although she maintained contact with her father. Following Tremblay's parents' separation, her mother began dating a man named Ronald Lacroix, whom she frequently met at the La Salle Social Club in Lawrence, approximately thirty miles north of Boston and close to the state border with New Hampshire. Her mother would frequently bring Tremblay with her on these dates, with the child occasionally waiting in her mother's car as she socialized with her boyfriend, passing the time waiting within or outside the bar, perusing stalls at a nearby corner market, or simply playing nearby with local children before her mother drove her home. (Note: A bartender at the La Salle Social Club would later state that on the occasions Tremblay accompanied her mother to the club, the child would frequently sit alone at a table for up to six hours as her mother socialized within the premises.)

== September 11, 1988 ==
On the weekend of September 10–11, 1988, Tremblay had been in a playful but mischievous mood. She spent the afternoon of September 10 at a friend's home, although her mother later informed reporters her daughter had been sent home from this friend's house during the evening due to her misbehavior.

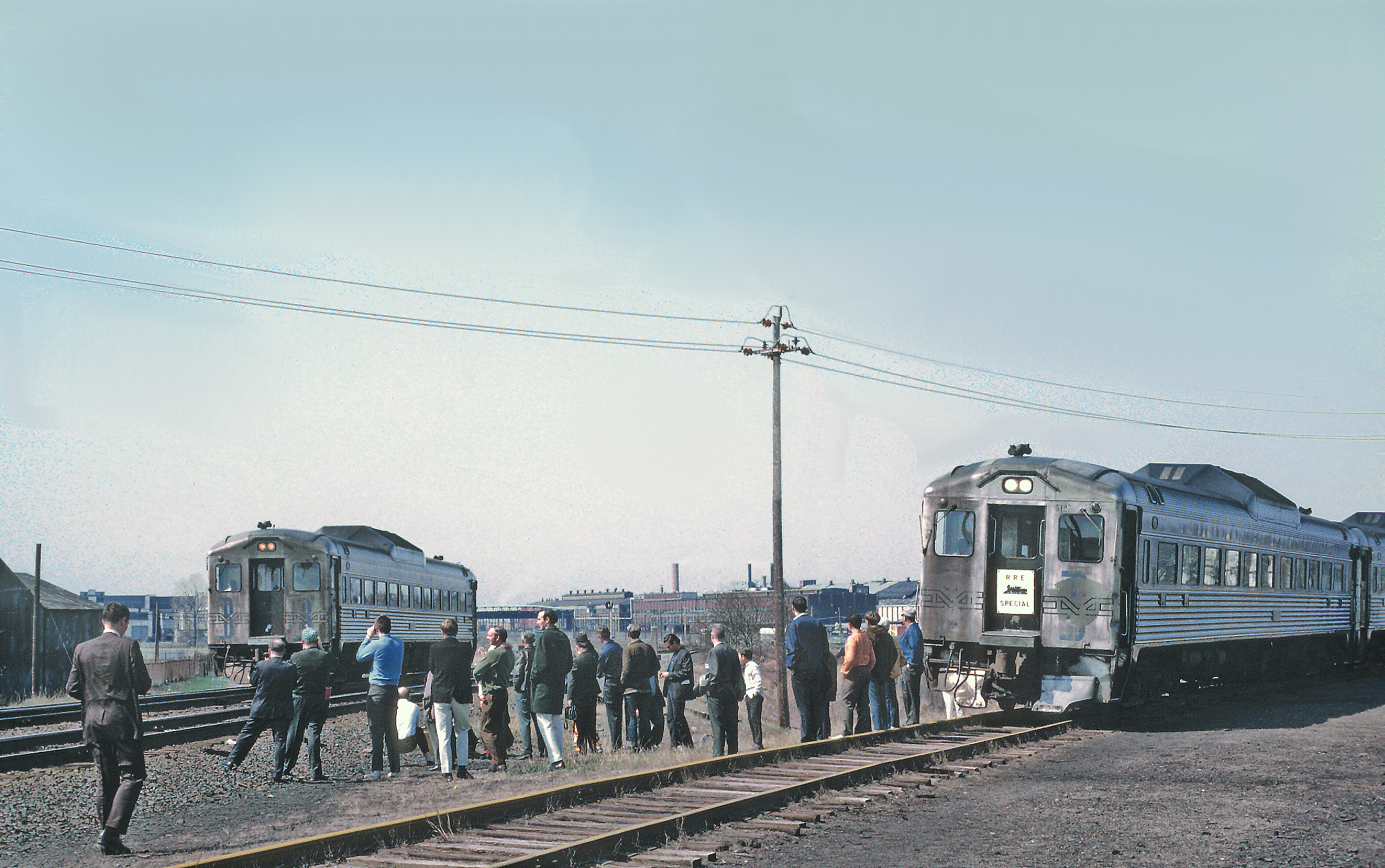
A section of the Boston and Maine Railroad, seen here in 1969

By prearrangement, in the early afternoon of Sunday September 11, Tremblay's mother drove from Salem to Lawrence to meet her boyfriend at the La Salle Social Club. Tremblay accompanied her mother on this occasion, and shortly after the two entered the club, the child asked the bartender, Robert Nadeau, to make her some popcorn before venturing outside the premises at approximately 2:45 p.m., informing Nadeau, her mother and Lacroix of her intention to meet some friends close to the railroad tracks, but promising she would be "right back".

Tremblay's precise movements upon leaving the La Salle Social Club are unknown, although she is known to have visited the home of a local resident whose children she had recently befriended to inquire whether her four children could play with her. Upon learning the four children were grounded, Tremblay left the residence. The two people who last saw Tremblay alive were a pizza delivery employee and a railroad worker. The railroad worker observed the child loitering near the Boston and Maine Railroad, reasonably close to the La Salle Social Club, at approximately 3 p.m.; this individual would later inform police he had told Tremblay she should not be in the area for safety reasons. According to this eyewitness, Tremblay followed his advice and left the scene without argument. Approximately ninety minutes later, the pizza delivery driver observed the child talking with the driver of a rusty, tan-colored van.

=== Disappearance ===
By 4 p.m., Tremblay's mother had become concerned as to her daughter's whereabouts, with her concerns heightening as the hours passed. She and Lacroix first searched the social club in efforts to locate her before they and other patrons of the club began searching nearby streets—including sections of the railroad tracks close to the club—in efforts to find the child before Janet reported her as missing to the Lawrence Police Department at approximately 9 p.m. Police immediately implemented a search to locate the child.

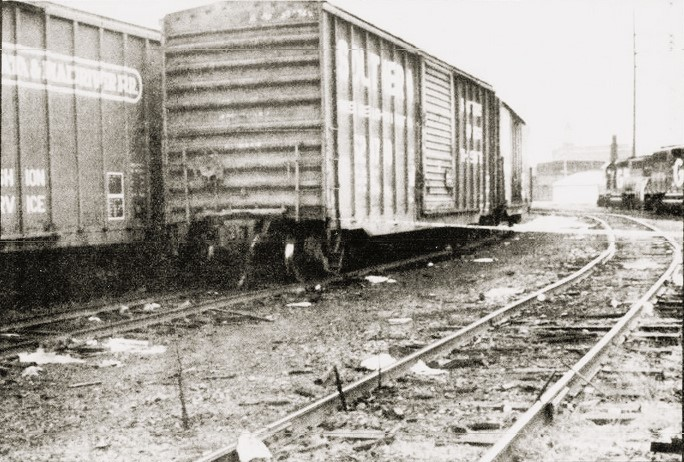
The freight cart beneath which Tremblay's body was discovered

=== Discovery ===
At 3:45 p.m. on September 12, a rail worker discovered Tremblay's fully-clothed body in a freight yard close to Andover Street and South Broadway—just one block from the La Salle Social Club. Her body was discovered lying face-down on the tracks of the Boston and Maine Railroad, with her left leg evidently amputated close to the hip by the freight carriage beneath which her body partially lay and her hands caked with blood and mud. Tremblay's denim purse—containing several coins, a candy wrapper, sparkle makeup and Tremblay's I.D. card for the Boys & Girls Clubs of America—lay approximately sixty feet from the location of her body. Evidence of a ferocious physical struggle was discovered at this location, with several blood spatterings, ample soil churnings and numerous footprints belonging to Tremblay and her assailant evident, indicating the child had been attacked and beaten at this location and her body then carried to the location of her discovery—likely in an effort to either hide the body or make her death seem accidental.

An autopsy conducted at the University of Massachusetts Medical Center at Worcester on September 14 revealed the child had been beaten, stabbed once in the liver and once in her chest, with a deep incision wound also inflicted across her throat just beneath her Adam's apple. She had also suffered a fractured skull and severe bruising to her back. The majority of these wounds had contributed to Tremblay's death, although she had ultimately died of her stab wounds. Furthermore, Tremblay had already been deceased at the time the passing freight train had severed her left leg at the hip. An examination of the wounds inflicted revealed Tremblay's killer was left-handed, and the child had most likely been attacked from behind.

== Initial investigation ==
The Lawrence Police Department launched an intense manhunt to apprehend Tremblay's murderer, with numerous officers assigned full-time to the case. Questioning of local residents revealed the section of railroad where Tremblay's murder had been committed was a popular location for children to play, although local drug users and homeless individuals were known to sleep in the empty freight carriages. Although numerous railroad workers, local residents and known sex offenders were questioned, many were soon eliminated as suspects. Theories Tremblay's murder may be linked to a series of unsolved murders committed in railroad yards in Oregon, or linked to the unsolved 1985 abduction of a 9-year-old girl in Wayland were pursued and discounted.

Extensive inquiries produced two eyewitnesses who insisted they had seen Tremblay speaking to an unkempt white man in his mid-30s close to the Lil' Peach convenience store near the intersection of Andover and Parker—just one block from where her body would be discovered—at approximately 5:30 p.m. on the afternoon of her disappearance. This individual had dark hair, generous facial hair growth though not a full beard, and a dark complexion. He had been driving a notably rusty, tan-colored van.

Despite contemporary police efforts and numerous persons of interest interviewed, Tremblay's murder remained unsolved and the case gradually became cold. Nonetheless, several individuals were never discounted as suspects, although insufficient evidence existed for investigators to issue formal charges.

== Later forensic developments ==
Due to advancements in DNA analysis, investigators assigned to the Essex District Attorney's Office specializing in cold cases began re-investigating Tremblay's unsolved murder in 2014; these individuals were able to develop a DNA profile from the skin and flesh scrapings discovered beneath her fingernails. With assistance from the California-based forensic genealogy firm Identifinders International, this genetic information was traced to an individual with the family surname McClendon. This development was considered a major breakthrough, as an individual who had long been considered a strong suspect in her murder had this surname.

The individual in question who had long been considered a suspect was now retired and living in Alabama, but had been employed as a carpenter in Chelmsford, Massachusetts at the time of Tremblay's murder and had been known to frequent establishments close to the crime scene. In addition, the suspect had owned a tan-colored van in 1988, was the only male member of his entire family who was left-handed, and the only individual to have visited or resided in Massachusetts in the 1980s.

=== Formal questioning ===
Initially questioned in relation to the crime on March 15, 2021, the suspect denied any involvement in Tremblay's murder. He and his family later willingly provided DNA samples to assist in the investigators' efforts, the results of which solidified the original forensic familial DNA evidence obtained in Tremblay's postmortem examination—indicating the perpetrator of the crime was genetically linked to the McClendon family.

In early 2022, the suspect was formally questioned by Massachusetts State Police with regards to these further forensic developments. He again denied any culpability in Tremblay's death, and suggested the reason for this forensic match was that his own brother may have been the perpetrator.

As the family of Melissa Tremblay, we would like to address the recent arrest made in her case ... Since her murder in 1988, we have always prayed for justice. We have never stopped thinking of Missy, despite what others, who say they are her friends, have said in the media. My aunt Janet may not have used the best judgment in allowing Missy to play around in the neighborhood of the social club, but that is between her and God. She loved Missy and never intended any harm to come to her.

— Section of public statement issued by Tremblay's surviving relatives upon being informed of the suspect's arrest. April 2022.

=== Arrest warrant ===
These forensic developments were considered sufficient to issue a warrant for the suspect's arrest on April 26, 2022. He was placed under arrest and charged as a fugitive from justice the following day, with a spokesman for the district attorney's office informing the media: "We never gave up on Melissa, nor did we give up on holding her killer responsible." The suspect later waived a rendition hearing and was transported from Alabama to Massachusetts to face trial.

Upon being informed of these developments, Tremblay's surviving family members issued a press statement in which they thanked investigators for continuing to seek justice for their loved one, adding they hoped justice would now finally be served against her murderer. (Note: Tremblay's adoptive mother, Janet, had died of chronic obstructive pulmonary disease on November 20, 2015 at the age of seventy.)

On May 13, 2022, the suspect appeared before a judge in Lawrence to be formally charged with Tremblay's first-degree murder. He pleaded not guilty to the charge, and the presiding judge ordered him remanded without bail. One month later, an Essex County grand jury formally indicted the suspect for Tremblay's murder. He was held in protective custody, to await trial. (Note: Massachusetts has no capital punishment for murder in the first degree. The suspect faced a potential life sentence without the possibility parole if successfully convicted.)

== Trials ==
=== First trial ===
The suspect was brought to trial before Judge Jeffrey Karp in Salem, Massachusetts on December 7, 2023, He chose not to testify in his own defense, and pleaded not guilty on the opening date of his trial.

In the prosecution's opening statement, Assistant District Attorney Jessica Strasnick informed the jury: "The evidence you have will show you that [the suspect] was, in fact, in that railroad on September 11, 1988, and that he did, in fact, kill her." Strasnick then played a clip of police bodycam footage of the suspect speaking to detectives prior to his formal arrest in which he divulged details of Tremblay's murder he claimed he had simply learned from media coverage, before Strasnick informed the jury: "Some of the things that [the suspect] described had actually never been published."

Referencing the physical evidence to be introduced into evidence, Strasnick explained that DNA evidence linked the suspect to Tremblay's murder and that as the use of DNA evidence was still in its infancy at the time of the murder, Tremblay’s hands and feet were wrapped with evidence bags prior to her autopsy. Strasnick also informed the jurors of a statement the suspect had allegedly given to investigators shortly after being informed of his arrest: "At least I got twenty years out of my retirement pension."

Defense attorney Henry Fasoldt argued in his opening statement to the jury that the DNA evidence referenced by the prosecution did not specifically identify his client as being the source of this physical evidence, adding his client had no motive to commit the murder, and had fully cooperated with investigators at all times throughout their inquiries, including willingly submitting DNA samples for comparison with crime scene evidence. Fasoldt further claimed the state's case was entirely "based upon assumptions" pertaining to "a crime that hasn't been solved".

The first witness to testify was the rail worker who had observed Tremblay "hanging around" the railroad yard, close to Andover Street shortly before her murder; this individual described to the courtroom how he had told the child to leave the area, and she had done so. Also to testify was State Trooper Kenneth Kelleher, who described being called to the crime scene shortly after the discovery of Tremblay's body. Kelleher outlined the injuries he observed upon the child before he had immediately secured her extremities with evidence bags in order that they could be tested for trace evidence. Tremblay's body, Kelleher testified, was then immediately placed in a clean white sheet before being taken to the medical examiner's office to undergo an autopsy.

On the fourth day of the trial, a supervisor from the Massachusetts State Crime Laboratory explained to the jury the painstaking forensic analysis conducted upon the skin and flesh scrapings discovered beneath Tremblay's fingernails and that the DNA profile obtained did not match any of the alternate suspects earlier named by the defense. This individual also testified that the DNA match was conclusive solely to male members of the McClendon family, including the suspect. The following day, the suspect's former wife testified her ex-husband had been in Massachusetts in September 1988 and that he was the sole male family member who was left-handed. Her testimony was followed by that of several male family members who each testified they were right-handed, and had not been in Massachusetts in September 1988. Their testimony was followed by that of a forensic pathologist, who stated that Tremblay had been attacked from behind and that her assailant had been a left-handed individual.

The defense called two witnesses on the eighth day of the trial. The first—a forensic pathologist named Jennifer Lipman—testified that, having reviewed the autopsy photos of Tremblay, she was unable to determine whether the child's murderer had attacked her from behind or the front or whether or not her assailant had been left-handed. Lipman's testimony was followed by that of an expert on genetics, who implied that although the suspect's DNA linked him via relation to the individual who had murdered Tremblay, he may simply have been a biological relation as opposed to the actual perpetrator.

The trial lasted nine days, with jurors beginning their deliberations on December 19. At 10:05 a.m. on December 27, the jury delivered a note to the trial judge indicating that, after having deliberated for over thirty-two hours, they could not unanimously agree on the verdict and remained deadlocked. As such, the judge declared a mistrial and dismissed the jury.

=== Retrial and acquittal ===
The suspect was retried on October 15, 2024. He was again tried before Judge Jeffrey Karp in Salem, Massachusetts, with Jessica Strasnick and Marina Moriarty again prosecuting the case, and Henry Fasoldt defending. As had been the case at the suspect's initial trial, several of Tremblay's surviving relatives and childhood friends attended the entire duration of the legal proceedings.

Outlining the state's primary physical evidence against the suspect, Assistant District Attorney Jessica Strasnick again argued the DNA evidence retrieved from beneath Tremblay's fingernails at her 1988 postmortem "[excluded] 99.8 percent of the male population" and proved a forensic familial DNA match to the McClendon family, adding: "He assumed he had gotten away with it after thirty-three years." Strasnick also informed the jury the suspect was knowledgeable regarding key details pertaining to Tremblay's murder which were not common public knowledge, including the fact the child had been beaten prior to her murder, and that, in 1988, he had owned a distinctive rusty, tan-colored van similar to one described by eyewitnesses as being in the vicinity of the crime scene when Tremblay had been murdered.

Defense attorney Henry Fasoldt again argued no solid proof existed the DNA retrieved from Tremblay's body sourced from his client, or that the DNA had been retrieved from beneath her fingernails. Fasoldt also speculated the knife wounds discovered upon the child's body may have been inflicted by a right-handed individual as opposed to left-handed one.

The DNA was Missy's way of trying to tell us who killed her. She fought for her life and got his DNA under her fingernails so that we would be able to get a match and make the person killing her pay for his crime ... While he was found not guilty in a court of law, he will ultimately pay for his crime on the final Judgment Day before God.

— Section of public statement issued by Tremblay's surviving relatives immediately following the suspect's November 5, 2024 acquittal.

The suspect's second trial lasted nine days, with both counsels delivering their closing arguments on the tenth day before the jury began their deliberations on October 28.

On November 4, following five days of deliberations, the jury informed the judge they remained deadlocked upon the issue as to whether the DNA discovered beneath Tremblay's fingernails actually sourced from the suspect. Judge Karp instructed the jurors to continue their deliberations. The following day, the jurors returned a verdict of not guilty. Shortly thereafter, the suspect returned to Alabama, with his lawyer having issued a statement in which he informed the media his client was "greatly relieved" by the verdict, adding: "We appreciate the jury's careful and thoughtful deliberations."

Tremblay's surviving family members also issued a public statement following the suspect's acquittal in which they stated that although they respected the legal process, they remained steadfast in their belief the DNA evidence presented unequivocally proved the suspect's guilt. Essex County District Attorney Paul Tucker also stated to the press he was "disappointed with the verdict", although he praised the efforts and conduct of all prosecutors and law enforcement officials who had brought the case to trial and also adding: "I recognize the work and dedication of the jury during their long deliberations in this case."

== See also ==
- Cold case
- Crime in Massachusetts
- Double jeopardy – Legal defence preventing someone from being tried again on the same charges
- List of homicides in Massachusetts
- List of murdered American children
- List of solved missing person cases: 1950–1999
- List of unsolved murders (1980–1999)
- National Center for Missing & Exploited Children
