= Murder of Rebecca Riley =

2006 murder of a child in Springfield, Massachusetts, U.S.

Rebecca Riley
- Born: Rebecca Jeanne Riley; April 11, 2002; Springfield, Massachusetts, U.S.
- Died: December 13, 2006 (aged 4); Hull, Massachusetts, U.S.
- Cause of death: Overdose of clonidine
- Parents: Carolyn Riley (mother); Michael Riley (father)

Rebecca Jeanne Riley (April 11, 2002 – December 13, 2006) was a four-year-old girl from Massachusetts. In December 2006, Riley's parents gave Riley—who had been diagnosed with attention-deficit hyperactivity disorder and pediatric bipolar disorder between two and three years old—a lethal dose of clonidine. Her death sparked significant controversy over the diagnosis of psychiatric conditions and subsequent prescription of psychotropic medication for children.

== Background ==
Rebecca Jeanne Riley was born on April 11, 2002, in Springfield, Massachusetts, to Carolyn (née DiSalvo) and Michael Riley. Riley lived with two older siblings, Gerard and Kaitlynne. She also had an older half-sister, Ashley, whom Carolyn had surrendered in an open adoption at two years old.

Most of the Riley family had been diagnosed with mental illness. Michael, who had unmedicated bipolar disorder and "intermittent rage disorder", had reportedly been arrested for assault and battery in 1998. Carolyn took medication for migraines and Paxil for depression and anxiety. Gerard and Kaitlynne were reportedly under the care of child psychiatrist Kayoko Kifuji for pediatric bipolar disorder and attention-deficit hyperactivity disorder (ADHD). Kaitlynne had been diagnosed with bipolar disorder in April 2003, when she was two years old, and prescribed the mood stabilizer Depakote (valproate). A social worker disagreed with Kaitlynne's diagnosis, stating that her behavior was normal for a toddler.

Both parents were unemployed, lived in Section 8 housing and received monthly Social Security Disability Income. Gerard and Kaitlynne both qualified for Supplemental Security Income payments, which totaled about $2,300 per month. The family received an estimated total of $2,700 per month.

Relatives and Kifuji noted that the Riley parents did not administer medication according to doctor's orders. Both parents reportedly nicknamed mood stabilizers and clonidine "happy medicine" and "sleep medicine," respectively. Carolyn allegedly offered her Paxil and migraine medications to a housemate, and had given Kaitlynne some of Gerard's clonidine tablets before Kifuji had prescribed the medication for her.

== Psychiatric treatment ==
=== Beginning of psychiatric treatment ===
On August 27, 2004, when Riley was two years old, her parents reported to Kifuji (then working at the Tufts-New England Medical Center) that the girl was hyperactive, getting little sleep, and acted violently towards her older siblings. Kifuji, who had already been treating the older two Riley children, stated that she believed Carolyn was accurately reporting her children's behaviors and reactions to the medications. Riley was diagnosed with ADHD and prescribed one tablet of clonidine, an antihypertensive drug that is also used off-label for ADHD in children. At this point, Kifuji was reportedly seeing all three children in the span of an hour, giving her approximately 20 minutes to assess Riley's behavior.

After the diagnosis, Riley's parents submitted an application for Supplemental Security Income, which, if approved, would have provided another US$630.00 to the Riley family. However, the application was denied.

Within less than a week, Carolyn began giving Riley two tablets of clonidine without Kifuji's approval. On September 1, she informed Kifuji of the increased dosage over the phone. Though Kifuji had not given her permission to do this, she authorized the increase. Kifuji reportedly increased Riley's clonidine dosage again in January 2005.

In May 2005, Riley's parents claimed to Kifuji that the now three-year-old Riley was experiencing mood swings and crying frequently. Kifuji diagnosed Riley with pediatric bipolar disorder, which she later explained was due to the girl's in-office behavior and family history. For bipolar disorder, Riley was prescribed the mood stabilizer Depakote (valproate).

=== Early Social Services involvement ===
Michael Riley was arrested in June 2005 after Carolyn's 13-year-old daughter accused him of sexual assault. In light of these allegations, the Massachusetts Department of Social Services (DSS) required him to leave the Weymouth apartment, only see his children under direct supervision, and barred him from staying at the apartment overnight. Afterwards, neighbors allegedly became hostile towards the family, vandalizing their apartment and car.

There were no documented changes to Riley's prescription regimen until October 27, 2005, when Carolyn reported that she had increased Riley's nightly dose of clonidine to two and a half tablets, allegedly to help the child sleep. Kifuji, alarmed, explained to Carolyn that such an increase could prove fatal and told her to talk to her about adjustments to Riley's medications. She allegedly told Carolyn that if the mother further increased the dose on her own, she would report her to DSS. Riley was then prescribed Zyprexa (olanzapine), an atypical antipsychotic frequently used for the treatment of bipolar disorder.

=== Attempts at intervention ===
Riley was enrolled in preschool in January 2006, where school faculty quickly grew concerned about her wellbeing. She displayed symptoms of overmedication: she had a tremor in her hand and appeared "lethargic" and "unsteady on her feet," shaking so severely that she could not use stairs or exit the school bus without an adult's help. The Depakote caused her to constantly need to urinate. The school nurse noted the girl was weak and not particularly resistant, describing her as being like "a floppy doll." One teacher noted that Riley would become more attentive and lively around 2 PM, "using words and attempting activities," and suspected this was around the time the girl's medication was wearing off. None of the faculty noticed mood or behavioral symptoms consistent with pediatric bipolar disorder or ADHD; by contrast, some testified that Riley was "a very sweet little girl."

School faculty tried to share their concerns with Riley's parents, but had little success. Michael did not go to the girl's preschool, and while Carolyn was reachable by phone, she showed up infrequently. She reportedly dismissed concerns about Riley's behavior, saying the girl had been sleeping poorly. Officials noted that Carolyn had a flat affect, spoke in monotone, and regularly appeared lethargic herself, leading some to suspect Carolyn was also overmedicated. Despite their concerns, the school did not file a report with DSS.

In February 2006, Kifuji began transitioning Riley from Zyprexa to Seroquel (quetiapine).

A social worker from South Bay Mental Health Services began treating Riley and her sister Kaitlynne at the family's apartment in May 2006. Upon arrival, the children were frequently asleep; while she worked with them, she noted that both girls were too weak to draw with a crayon. The social worker also noted that Carolyn appeared sluggish, "drugged out," and frequently neglected the children, once failing to clean a puddle of urine off the floor. Like the preschool faculty, the social worker did not observe any mood or behavioral symptoms in Riley that would require pharmaceutical treatment.

During the summer of 2006, the social worker filed two reports with DSS. One alleged neglect, while the other was in response to Kaitlynne stating Michael had struck her. She also placed a call to Kifuji to express concern about the children's medication regimen; Kifuji allegedly stated that she was also concerned, but that according to Carolyn's reports during appointments, the children's behavior did not improve on lower dosages. After Carolyn was contacted by DSS officials in July, she abruptly fired the social worker, then placed a call to Kifuji asking her to tell DSS they did not need to investigate. DSS later closed both of the social worker's reports as "unsubstantiated."

Carolyn's half-brother, James McGonnell, moved into the family's Weymouth apartment in August 2006. That same month, Carolyn began attempting to obtain extra prescriptions of clonidine from the pharmacy. Though she sometimes had an explanation for needing more clonidine (such as claiming she lost the previous prescription or that the pills were damaged by water), she often did not. By late August, Kifuji began prescribing the children's clonidine in ten-day increments due to the lost pills.

At some point, Michael began visiting Carolyn and the children without supervision, in violation of DSS requirements. In October 2006, during one of these visits, Michael allegedly grabbed Gerard by the throat and slammed his head against the rear windshield of his pickup truck. Carolyn subsequently filed for a restraining order against Michael. Later that month, Kelly Williams and her six-year-old son moved into the Weymouth apartment.

Williams later recalled that Carolyn stored the children's medications in a large pill box and would give them their clonidine tablet at 7:30 pm each night. Though Riley was supposed to be receiving three half-tablets of clonidine daily, Williams and McGonnell told police that when they had seen Carolyn give Riley her medication, she had always been given full tablets. (Note: The police affidavit states that neither Williams nor McGonnell were aware that Riley was prescribed half-tablets.) According to Williams, Carolyn had once confessed she thought the amount of medication was "excessive," but was following doctor's orders.

=== Move to Hull ===
In early November 2006, officials at Riley's preschool contacted Kifuji, stating that they were concerned about the amount of medication administered to the girl. Kifuji planned to discuss decreasing Riley's clonidine dosage, but Carolyn reportedly became agitated upon hearing of the phone call, claiming the school had not contacted her.

Carolyn did not renew the restraining order against Michael, leading it to expire in November 2006. However, according to DSS officials, she claimed on November 10 that the restraining order was still in place. She additionally informed DSS representatives that she intended to move to Hull, Massachusetts, with McGonnell and Williams and that Michael would not move in with them. That same month, Michael was attacked by a neighbor at the Weymouth apartment.

On November 14, the Rileys (excluding Michael), McGonnell, Williams, and their son moved from Weymouth to Hull, Massachusetts. Michael moved in with them at the beginning of December, despite the restrictions on seeing his children and Carolyn's claims that he was not going to live with them. McGonnell and Williams later testified that upon Michael's return to the household, the Riley children would stay in their rooms when their father was home, as Michael would become upset at "disruptions." Williams stated Michael would reportedly demand that Carolyn give the children clonidine to "shut these kids up" or "calm them down," leading Carolyn to begin administering the children's nighttime clonidine dose as early as 5:30 PM.

Riley's condition visibly deteriorated in the months preceding her death. McGonnell and Williams said that the girl grew "zombified," not speaking and approaching people silently; she would sleep for as long as 17 hours per day, only waking to eat. Faculty at Riley's preschool noted that Riley became so weak that an aide needed to support her body when sitting. A neighbor noticed that Riley and her siblings appeared "listless" and robotic.

== Final days and death ==
Kifuji last saw Riley and Carolyn at an appointment on December 7, 2006. Kifuji told Carolyn that if Riley continued improving, they could discuss reducing her clonidine prescription at the next appointment.

On Friday, December 8, Riley developed symptoms of what first appeared to be a cold. Within a day, she developed a "barking cough" like that of croup. By December 10, she had developed a fever, begun vomiting and refusing to eat, and reportedly spat out the cough syrup Carolyn attempted to give her. (Note: Kifuji initially told investigators that she had previously told Carolyn not to administer cough medication to Riley due to its potential interactions. She later stated in a court deposition that she had not advised Carolyn on administering cough medication to Riley and that "[Kifuji] was never asked.") Later that day, she began wandering aimlessly around the house, appearing restless. Williams and McGonnell, concerned about Riley's health, repeatedly encouraged Carolyn to take Riley to the doctor or emergency room. Though Carolyn told them that Riley had an appointment with her pediatrician on December 11, she had not attempted to schedule an appointment.

Riley showed minimal improvement on December 11, with an ear thermometer registering her temperature at 100.7 degrees F. Despite her illness, the parents took her to a Social Security office to inquire about a delayed payment, but had to reschedule the meeting when Riley vomited in the waiting room. She continued to wander listlessly around the house and refused food.

=== Death ===
Throughout Riley's illness, McGonnell and Williams had both grown increasingly angry with Michael's and Carolyn's refusal to take Riley to a doctor, but believed that calling emergency services themselves would be unsuccessful because they were not Riley's parents. In the afternoon of December 12, McGonnell reportedly threatened to beat Michael "so that the ambulance will come and take both of you," and allegedly broke a shelf off of the wall in anger. Michael told McGonnell that he and Carolyn had an appointment with Riley's pediatrician the following morning, though no such appointment was scheduled.

The evening of December 12, 2006, a visibly unfocused Riley knocked on her parents' bedroom door. According to Williams, the girl asked for her mother, but was unable to say "mama" or "Mommy" without choking. Michael told the girl, "Go to your fucking room," and did not allow Riley inside. She returned to her parents' bedroom twice afterwards; both times, Michael shouted at her and made her return to her room.

That evening, (Note: Carolyn and Michael told police the events took place around 9:00 PM; McGonnell and Williams said they took place around 6:30 PM.) the girl's parents administered her nighttime dose of medication; they then left for Carolyn's mother's home, leaving Williams to watch Riley and her siblings. While the parents were out, Riley again wandered to her parents' bedroom, calling for her mother. Williams repeatedly explained to Riley that her parents were not home, but Riley apparently did not seem to understand.

At one point when Riley appeared to be searching for her mother, Williams called out to Riley, who did not react. Upon picking up the child, she noticed that the girl was cold, clammy, and hung stiffly from her arms, which alarmed Williams: Riley would usually cling "like a monkey" when picked up. After several hours, the parents returned home, where Williams again pushed for the girl's parents to take her to the hospital; Michael falsely claimed that they had an appointment with her pediatrician the next morning. Shortly afterwards, Carolyn gave Riley children's Tylenol, a liquid cough medicine containing cough suppressant dextromethorphan and antihistamine chlorpheniramine, and a tablet of clonidine.

Riley wandered back to her parents' bedroom around 10 PM. Michael spun Riley by the arm, pushed her, and shouted at her, "Go to your own fucking room." Riley began crying and said that she felt sick, but Michael did not allow her in the room. Though McGonnell pleaded with Michael to take her to the hospital, his attempts were unsuccessful, and Williams eventually took Riley back to her bedroom.

McGonnell was awoken around 1 AM by a phone call from the tow truck company he worked for, at which point he heard Riley struggling to breathe. Upon entering Riley's room, he discovered her "gurgling" and with vomit on her face. One court document reports that she coughed up a reddish substance onto McGonnell's clothing. McGonnell went to Carolyn and Michael's bedroom, kicking their door in when they did not open it, and kicking the parents' bed to wake them up. McGonnell told the parents of Riley's rapidly-worsening condition and demanded they bring her to the emergency room, reportedly asking, "What if she dies?" Michael again refused to seek treatment for the girl; McGonnell later testified that Michael had acted as though "it was a big joke."

Carolyn convinced Michael to allow Riley—reportedly "stiff, gasping for air, and moaning"—to sleep on the floor of their bedroom. Michael agreed, but told Carolyn to administer more clonidine to the girl. Before going to sleep, Carolyn provided another half-tablet of clonidine to Riley, allegedly to help the girl sleep.

Carolyn and Michael awoke around 6:30 AM to discover Riley dead. A pink-tinted foam, originating from her nose and mouth, coated her face and hair and had pooled onto the carpeting. At 6:36 am, Michael called 911 to tell the operator that his daughter had died during the night. Afterwards, Michael reportedly started shouting, "Rebecca's dead, Rebecca's dead. I'm sorry, I'm sorry." Upon hearing the news, McGonnell reportedly responded with, "I told you she was dying."

Gerard and Kaitlynne were immediately transferred to foster care by DSS. Riley's body was eventually cremated; her ashes were first given to her parents, then to Carolyn's mother upon the parents' arrest.

== Investigation ==
Riley's death and the surrounding circumstances immediately raised concerns with emergency responders and DSS officials. They noted clonidine tablets missing from the bottles and pill box; bruises on Riley's thighs and inner arm that were consistent with physical abuse; and that Michael Riley had moved in with the family despite an active order from DSS requiring he be supervised around children. Michael was reportedly short-tempered with emergency responders, asking "how long this was going to take" and attempting to take the clonidine bottle from a police officer. Williams later testified that Kaitlynne and Gerard were sitting and playing with toys while emergency responders were at the home; Michael sought the children's clonidine tablets, but was unable to find them. Agitated, Michael unsuccessfully attempted to contact Kifuji and said he was seeking a refill for the siblings, who he claimed were "acting up."

According to the arrest affidavit, while emergency responders were at the Riley household, Williams and McGonnell reported their concerns about Riley's treatment to police officers at the scene. They detailed the preceding events to the officers, who began more closely investigating the case. During interviews with Hull police on December 13 and 14, Carolyn responded inconsistently to questions. She claimed she "didn't know" why she had initially filed a restraining order against Michael, even when presented with a copy of the order, and said that Gerard had forgiven his father for the incident. She also stated she did not know why she was eligible for SSDI benefits, as "her workers" had filled out the paperwork on her behalf. Both Michael and Carolyn claimed that Riley had not fallen ill until December 11.

School faculty noted that the parents went to their children's schools on December 14, primarily concerned with recovering money from gift cards and event deposits. Neither asked about Gerard or Kaitlynne, who were in foster care. Witnesses reported Carolyn's lack of reaction, stating that she spoke in a monotone, appeared numb, and did not cry. They also noted Michael's uncaring attitude towards his daughter's death; he allegedly told a neighbor while smirking that "maybe now we can get Section 8 housing" and told a mourner that Riley's memorial services were "all a big show" so that Carolyn "can get into heaven."

The state medical examiner, Elizabeth Bundock, determined from Riley's autopsy that she had died from the combination of clonidine, valproate, and cough medication. Though Riley was only prescribed 0.35 milligrams of clonidine per day at the time of her death, a toxicology screening found that Riley had ingested "two to three times" that amount. Court documents report that in children, the therapeutic range of clonidine is 1.5 to 2 nanograms per milliliter of blood; Riley's blood measured at 12 nanograms per milliliter. She was also prescribed 750 milligrams of Depakote and 200 milligrams of Seroquel, but the latter was not present in her body at the time of the autopsy. (Note: In her arrest affidavit, police allege that Carolyn said she did not give Riley the Seroquel the night she died, as she believed Riley would vomit it up.) The girl's heart and lungs showed signs of damage due to ongoing prescription drug overuse, and her lungs contained bloody fluid indicating a pulmonary edema.

When reviewing the family's pharmacy records, investigators discovered that Carolyn frequently called to refill prescriptions of clonidine weeks before Riley was due for a refill. Additionally, a pharmacy manager reported that Carolyn once shouted at her for refusing to authorize a refill of clonidine. The family had reportedly received about 205 extra clonidine tablets from pharmacies leading up to Riley's death.

On February 6, 2007, two months after Riley's death, Carolyn and Michael Riley were arrested and charged with first-degree murder of Rebecca Riley.

== Trial ==
Though the parents were initially scheduled to be tried together, the prosecution requested separate hearings, which would permit statements by both parents to be used against each other in court. Carolyn's trial began in January 2010; she was represented by defense attorneys Michael Bourbeau and Victoria Bonilla. Michael, represented by attorney John Darrell, began his trial on March 8, 2010. At the time of Michael's trial, he was already serving two and a half years in prison for providing pornography for a minor. Attorneys Frank Middleton and Heather Bradley represented the prosecution in both cases.

In both trials, the prosecution argued that the Riley parents had deliberately killed their daughter with an overdose of clonidine. Middleton argued that the parents had sought a fraudulent diagnosis for Riley in the hopes of obtaining an additional SSI payment, and overdosed her when their application was denied. They further stated that Carolyn and Michael had shown "malicious failure" to obtain emergency care for Riley, allowing her to suffer for several days despite her visible and progressively-worsening illness.

Bundock, testifying for the prosecution, stated that Riley's physical symptoms were not in line with those of pneumonia. The damage to the girl's heart and lungs, she reported, were the result of long-term drug misuse rather than illness. She testified that in most fatal cases of pneumonia, the lungs become filled with a yellow fluid indicating infection, not bloody fluid as had been present in Riley's lungs. A doctor testifying in the case stated that much lower doses of clonidine could be dangerous to children and adults, adding that she had seen patients in critical condition at far lower levels.

McGonnell, Williams, and Kifuji—the latter of whom testified against both parents in exchange for immunity from prosecution—testified to Carolyn administering medication in opposition to Kifuji's instructions. Preschool faculty and social workers reported that Carolyn seemingly refused to obtain a second opinion on her children's medication regimen, a sentiment echoed by Carolyn's aunt, who testified that Carolyn told her that her children "[didn't] respond to kid doses [and] needed adult doses." Williams and McGonnell both testified to the parents' repeated refusal to seek emergency treatment for Riley, and the Riley's pediatrician confirmed that the parents had not placed any calls to his practice in the days preceding Riley's death.

Arguing for the defense, Bourbeau and Darrell stated that Riley had died of a "fast-acting pneumonia," rather than overdose. They primarily focused the blame on Kifuji: they argued that the parents—low-income, disabled, and lacking higher education—trusted a doctor who should not have been prescribing psychotropic medications to young children. Both attorneys characterized Carolyn and Michael as troubled but loving parents who were unable to prevent their daughter's death. Bourbeau defended Carolyn's attempts to obtain extra pills, arguing that the clonidine tablets were small and easy to lose when halved.

On February 9, 2010, Carolyn Riley was found guilty of second-degree murder. She was sentenced to life in prison with the possibility of parole in 15 years. Carolyn Riley's parole hearing was heard on March 30, 2023. Parole was unanimously denied by the Board, citing her "account of (Rebecca's) death was at odds with both physical evidence and numerous witness statements." She will be eligible for review again after five years.

On March 27, 2010, Michael Riley was found guilty of first-degree murder. Per Massachusetts law, he was automatically sentenced to life in prison without the possibility of parole.

== Aftermath ==
Riley's death spurred discussion among psychiatric practitioners about pediatric mental health diagnosis and treatment. Controversy centered on the safety of prescribing psychotropic medication to children, as the medications prescribed to Riley and her siblings have only been FDA-approved for adults. There was additional discussion about whether young children can be diagnosed with conditions like bipolar disorder, which are usually diagnosed in adults.

=== Actions against Kifuji ===
Immediately following Riley's death, Kifuji voluntarily surrendered her medical license. The Tufts-New England Medical Center released a statement in support of Kifuji, stating that the medication she had prescribed to Riley "was appropriate and within professional standards." Some psychiatrists voiced concern over the fact that she prescribed medications to young children who were not receiving behavioral treatment; others stated that her method for diagnosing the children was not unusual. The Massachusetts Board of Registration in Medicine ruled against indicting Kifuji on September 2, 2009. Her license was reinstated, and she returned to practicing psychiatry.

In 2008, Riley's estate filed a medical malpractice claim against Kifuji for her role in administering psychotropic medications to Riley. The suit was settled for $2.5 million in January 2011, with Tufts Medical Center stating it did not wish to cause further distress to Riley's siblings.

=== Massachusetts Department of Social Services reform ===
The 2005 death of Dontel Jeffers and near-fatal abuse of Haleigh Poutre in 2006 had already placed the Massachusetts Department of Social Services under public scrutiny. Riley's death led to further criticism of DSS's failure to protect vulnerable children: despite multiple reports of abuse, neglect, and overmedication of the Riley household, which was already under investigation by DSS, the children had not been removed from the household.

The Patriot-Ledger reported that at least one-third of all DSS workers were assigned to more than their maximum limit of 18 cases. After Riley's death, the agency sought to work with independent medical specialists who could provide thorough review of pediatric medical treatment in DSS cases.

=== Appeals by Carolyn and Michael Riley ===
Carolyn Riley later appealed her conviction. The appeal was denied on September 20, 2013. Michael appealed shortly after, on November 29, 2013; his appeal was denied on April 15, 2014.

== See also ==
- List of homicides in Massachusetts
