= John Newcomen =

American murder victim

John Newcomen was murdered by Mayflower passenger John Billington in 1630, making him the first white settler murdered by another white settler in Plymouth Colony, Massachusetts, in what is now the United States.

There are two principal recordings of the event written in the 17th century. The first is from Governor William Bradford's Of Plymouth Plantation.

This year John Billington the elder (one that came over with the first) was arraigned; and both by grand, and petty jury found guilty of willful murder; by plain and notorious evidence. And was for the same accordingly executed. This as it was the first execution amongst them, so was it a matter of great sadness unto them; they used all due means about his trial, and took the advice of Mr. Winthrop, and other the ablest gentlemen in the Bay of Massachusetts, that were then newly come over, who concurred with them that he ought to die, and the land be purged from blood. He and some of his, had been often punished for miscarriages before, being one of the profanest families amongst them; ... His fact was, that he waylaid a young man, one John Newcomen (about a former quarrel) and shot him with a gun, whereof he died.

The second account comes from William Hubbard's A General History of New England from the Discovery to MDCLXXX (17th-century manuscript first published in 1815).

So when this wilderness began first to be peopled by the English where there was but one poor town, another Cain was found therein, who maliciously slew his neighbour in the field, as he accidentally met him, as he himself was going to shoot deer. The poor fellow perceiving the intent of this Billington, his mortal enemy, sheltered himself behind trees as well as he could for a while; but the other, not being so ill a marksman as to miss his aim, made a shot at them, and struck him on the shoulder, with which he died soon after. The murtherer expected that either for want of power to execute for capital offenses, or for want of people to increase the plantation, he should have his life spared; but justice otherwise determined.

Thomas Morton, writing in New English Canaan (1637), also makes a brief reference to the event, nicknaming John Billington the "Old Woodman", and making a punning reference to Newcomen:

Old Woodman ... was choked at Plymouth after he had played the unhappy marksman when he was pursued by a careless fellow that was new come into the land

No further information about Newcomen's family is known for certain. The name "New comin" may have been a reference to his status as a newcomer to the Plymouth rather than a surname.

== See also ==
- List of homicides in Massachusetts
