= Murder of Holly Piirainen =

American murder case

Holly Piirainen
- Born: Holly Kristen Piirainen; January 19, 1983; Grafton, Massachusetts, U.S.
- Died: August 5, 1993 (aged 10); Sturbridge, Massachusetts, U.S.
- Cause of death: Homicide of undetermined cause
- Body discovered: October 23, 1993; Brimfield, Massachusetts, U.S.

Holly Kristen Piirainen (January 19, 1983 – August 5, 1993) was a 10-year-old American murder victim from Grafton, Massachusetts. She and her brother had been visiting their grandparents in Sturbridge, Massachusetts, when Holly was murdered. Her murder remains unsolved.

== Disappearance ==
Prior to her disappearance, Piirainen and her family were staying at a family-owned lakefront cottage in Sturbridge. Piirainen and her 5-year-old brother, Zach, walked a short distance to a neighbor's house to see puppies. Her brother had returned to the cottage where the grandparents lived, but Piirainen did not.

Her father last saw Piirainen at 11:45 am prior to the siblings leaving to look at the puppies and reported her missing when she did not return. While waiting for police, the family began to search for her and were aided by local and state police, sheriff's departments and units from Connecticut and Rhode Island. One of Piirainen's shoes was found by the side of a road.

Searching for Piirainen took two months. On October 23, 1993, Piirainen's remains were found by hunters in Brimfield, Massachusetts. Due to the advanced state of decomposition, the cause of death and whether Piirainen was sexually assaulted could not be determined. The killer still has not been found.

== Investigation ==
Many investigators have theorized that the abduction of Piirainen was random as very few people knew that the family was in the area, and fewer knew that the children would be looking at puppies that day.

Hampden County District Attorney Anthony Gulluni announced on Oct. 23, 2025, that his office will conduct a Forensic Investigative Genetic Genealogy event to generate new leads in the case through DNA. "DNA collected from crime-scene evidence can be compared against publicly available genealogy databases to identify distant relatives of unknown suspects," he said in a press release. He acknowledged in a Facebook post that his office had DNA collected from the crime scene that had not been connected to anyone.

On Feb. 1, 2023, the Hampden DA's office held a press conference requesting more information regarding a T-shirt gathered as evidence in 1993 "in the vicinity" of where Holly was discovered in Brimfield. It is a white tank top style printed with the word BOSTON on it. District Attorney Gulluni said his office is interested in finding out who owned the shirt.

Fellow Massachusetts resident Molly Bish disappeared on June 27, 2000, while working as a lifeguard on Comins Pond in Warren, Massachusetts. Her body was also found in a wooded area in Hampden County on June 9, 2003, 5 mi (8.0 km) from her family home. Police considered the possibility that the two cases could be related. As of October 2025 no evidence has been revealed supporting this theory.

It was discovered that Bish had written a letter to Holly Piirainen's family following Holly's disappearance. This is an excerpt from Molly Bish's letter:

I am very sorry. I wish I could make it up to you. Holly is a very pretty girl. She is almost as tall as me. I wish I knew Holly. I hope they found her.

— Molly Bish at age 10

== David Pouliot ==
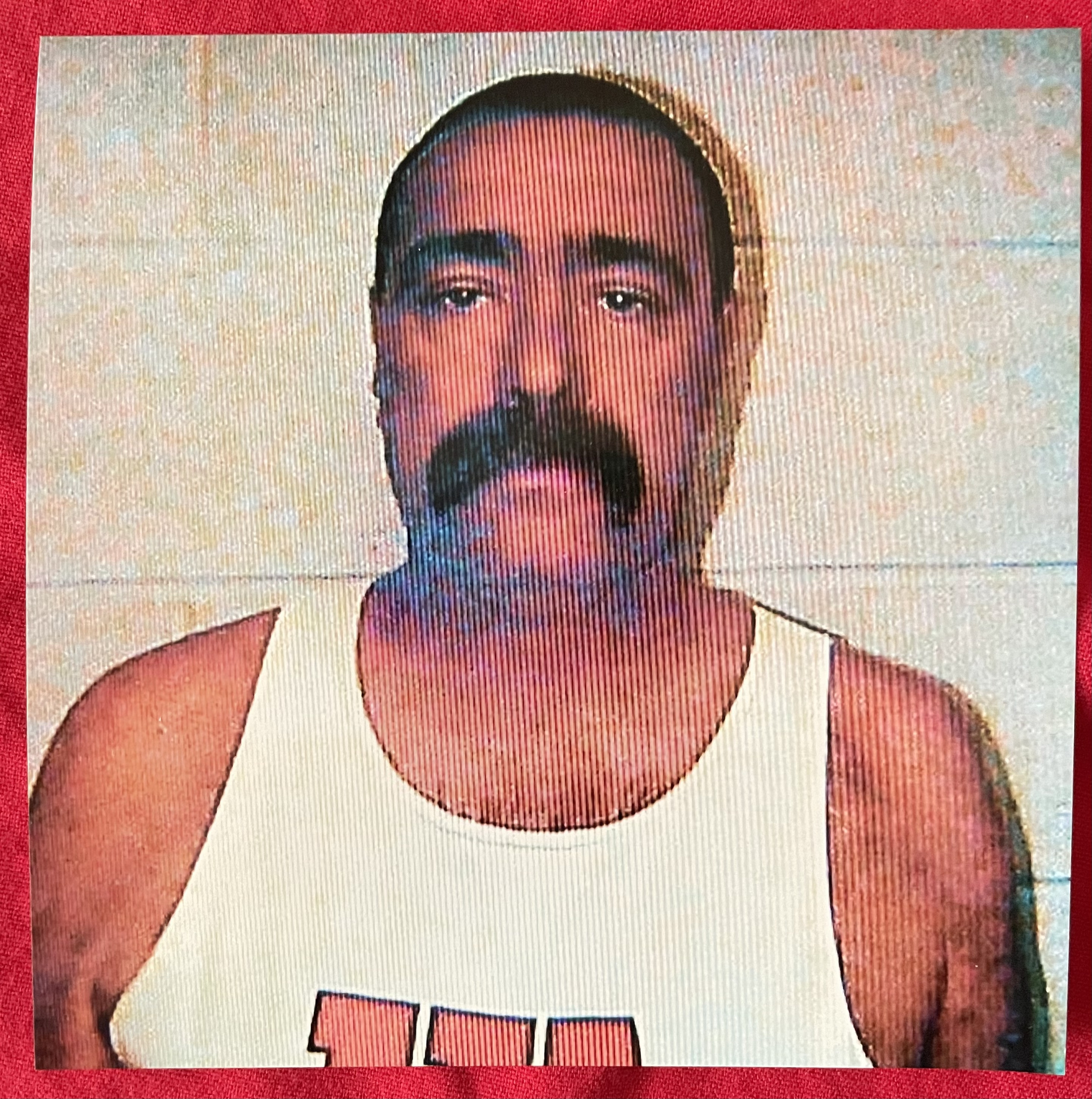
David Pouliot

A former Springfield resident, David Pouliot, is considered a person of interest in the Piirainen and Bish cases. On January 3, 2012, Hampden County District Attorney Mark Mastroianni announced that forensic evidence found near Piirainen's body had been linked to Pouliot, a suspect who died in 2003. Investigators have not disclosed the nature of the forensic evidence, nor the type of testing that linked Pouliot to the evidence. Investigators said that, although Pouliot was named a person of interest in the crime, he had not yet been formally named a suspect. Pouliot frequently hunted and fished around the area where Piirainen's body was found.

In October 2020, Boston news station WCVB-TV reported that according to their sources, the body of a 22-year-old man was exhumed at a cemetery in Hampden County, which might be connected to the investigation into the disappearance and murder of Piirainen. Sources told the news station that the man exhumed was not Pouliot. Holly's cousin Leah Jolin said investigators were searching for a letter placed in the subject's coffin that could advance the case. But Jolin said the retrieved item had suffered much water damage after over two decades in the ground. "So basically we have been told they're not really sure they're going to find anything useful,” Jolin said.

== The man in the pickup truck ==
A website created by a team of now-retired police investigators who worked on the case for years said an unidentified man in a brown pickup truck likely abducted and murdered Holly. On their website, they claim the man was driving down a neighboring street approximately 200 yards (180 m) from where Holly was standing and then slowed to a crawl to leer at two teenage girl cousins checking their mailbox. The girls retreated telling police later that they feared the man would jump out of the truck and grab one of them. When they returned a second time to the mailbox they saw the man once again after he turned around.

A woman who identified herself as the then-15-year-old girl debunked portions of the retired investigator's story. She said she was the only one who was at the mailbox that day. Also, she claimed that though she was creeped out by the man in the truck, she was not afraid of being apprehended.

The website said the man in the pickup truck likely turned around at the end of South Shore Drive, where Piirainen was standing. After the second encounter with the teen girls, one returned to her house and noticed the truck a third time, now accelerating past and not looking for the teens. The retired investigators believe that, given the area's rural nature and low crime rate, the man in the pickup truck abducted and murdered Holly.

Richard Price, an investigative reporter interviewed by The Worcester Telegram, discovered that one man, who lived in the area and owned a similar looking pickup truck, has a lengthy criminal history, though none involving a child. The reporter said he interviewed the subject’s ex-wife, claiming that her former husband had a sex addiction and often behaved compulsively, as also revealed on a podcast. However, she did not believe he would chase girls as young as 10.

The podcast reporter also revealed that a police report and interviewed sources show that the man, driving a brown pickup, was pulled over hours after the abduction by a Sturbridge police officer near the scene of the disappearance. The man’s driver's license was suspended, but police erroneously believed it was current and they sent him on his way.

In an interview on the podcast, a Piirainen family member said that an investigator told them the subject correctly identified a detail about Holly’s T-shirt on the day of the abduction, a detail different from what the public knew.

== Legacy ==
Since Piirainen's death, the Holly Piirainen Scholarship Fund was established in her memory by her family. Piirainen is included in a group memorial called the Garden of Peace in Boston, which memorializes Massachusetts victims of homicide.

In March 2021, the family issued a statement urging for any information about Piirainen's disappearance and death and the helpfulness of DNA testing after it helped solve the murder of Virginia Hannon, a 59-year-old woman murdered in Plymouth County in 1984.

On March 1, 2025, Christina Harrington, the mother of Holly Piirainen, died in Utah after a long illness. Before her death, she lived with her sons Zach and Andrew. Holly's aunt, Maureen Lemieux, said Tina was no longer in pain and is happy because she is with Holly.

== See also ==
- List of homicides in Massachusetts
- List of solved missing person cases: 1950–1999
- List of unsolved murders (1980–1999)
