= Hillside School (Marlborough, Massachusetts) =

Boys' School in Marlborough, Massachusetts

Location
- 404 Robin Hill Street; Marlborough, Massachusetts 01752; United States; 42.3522°N 71.6057°W

Information
- Religious affiliation: Non-sectarian
- Established: 1901
- Grades: K-9
- Enrollment: 140
- Student to teacher ratio: 7:1
- Campus type: rural
- Colors: Blue and white
- Nickname: Bulldogs
- Website: hillsideschool.net

Hillside School is a preparatory boarding and day school for boys in Marlborough, Massachusetts. The school is financially supported by the Daughters of the American Revolution.

== History ==
Hillside School was founded in 1901. It is located in Marlborough, 30 miles outside of Boston.

A private, non-sectarian boarding and day school for boys, it serves grades kindergarten through nine. Two thirds of the students are boarders and one third are day students.

The Daughters of the American Revolution (DAR) has financially supported the school since 1925 and operates a museum and library on the campus. It is one of six official DAR schools.

On September 29, 2003, the remains of 29-year-old Carmen Rudy, who was the first victim of the serial killer Main South Woodsman, were found on the school's campus.

== Notable alumni ==
- Terance Mann ('12), basketball player
- Dennis Cesana ('13), hockey player
- Gil Howland ('39), World War II veteran
- Austrian Robinson ('12), football player
