= John Billington =

Englishman who travelled to the New World on the Mayflower

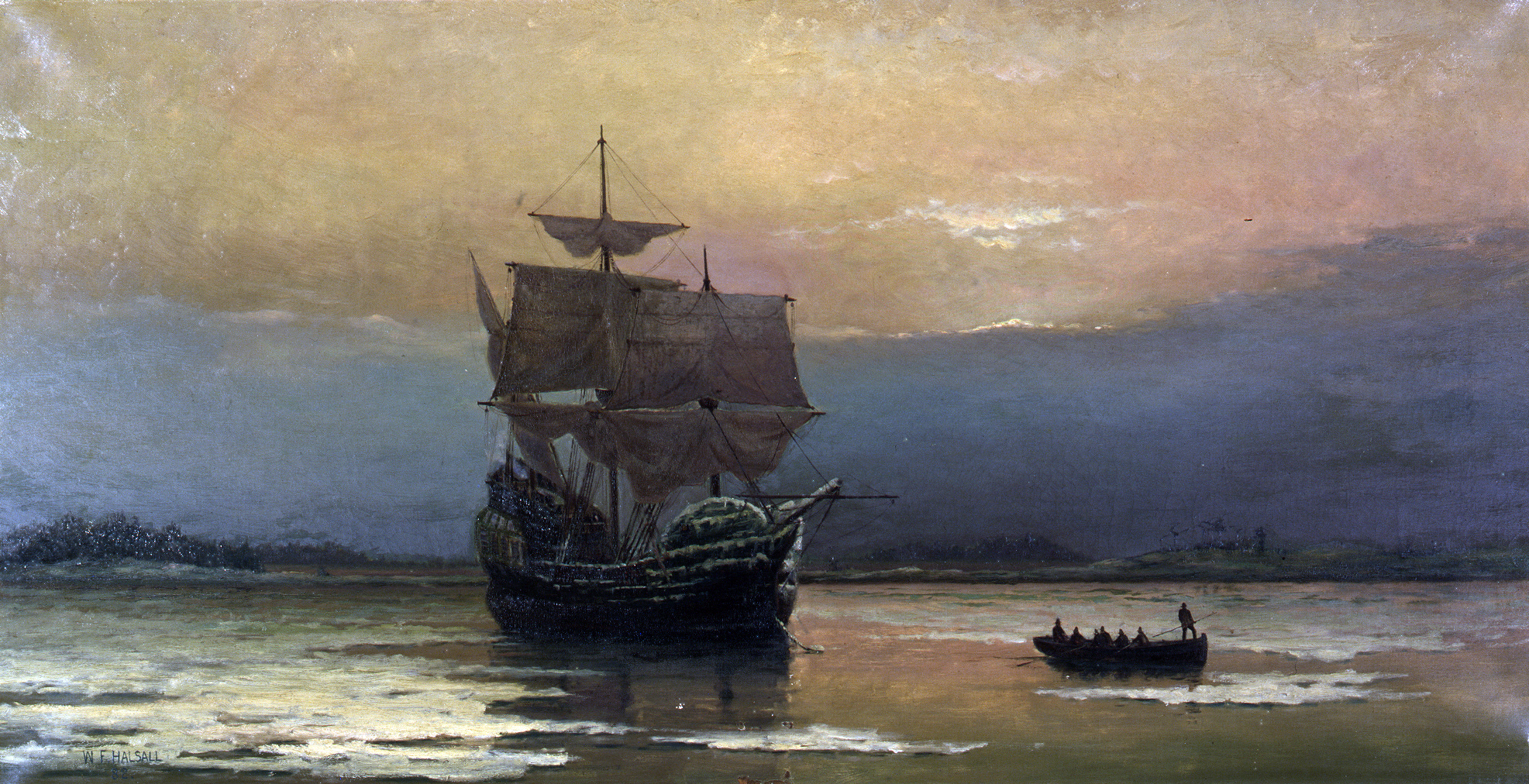
Mayflower in Plymouth Harbor by William Halsall (1882)

John Billington (also spelled as Billinton; c. 1580 – September 30, 1630) was an Englishman who travelled to the Americas on the Mayflower and was one of the signers of the Mayflower Compact. He was also the first citizen of the Plymouth Colony to be convicted of murder and executed.

== In England ==
Nothing is known about John Billington's life in England. His son Francis was named in a 1612 lease of property in Cowbit, Lincolnshire and either John or Eleanor, or both, were associated with this area. Around Cowbit and Spalding, in Lincolnshire, Francis Longland named young Francis Billington, son of John Billington, an heir.

== Mayflower voyage ==
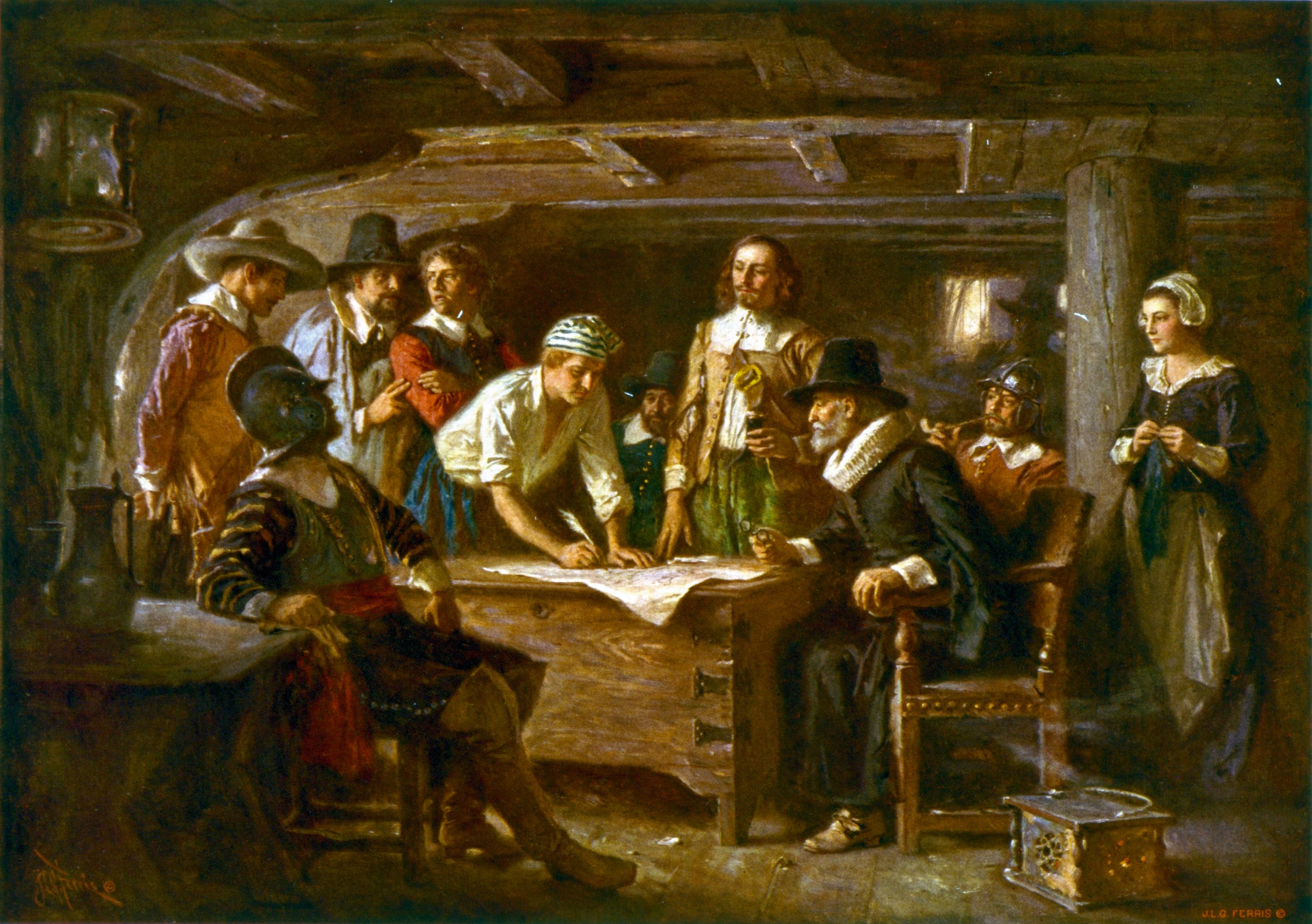
Signing the Mayflower Compact 1620, a painting by Jean Leon Gerome Ferris 1899

John Billington, his wife Elinor, and their two sons, John and Francis, departed on the Mayflower from Plymouth, Devon, England on September 6/16, 1620. The small, 100-foot ship had 102 passengers and a crew of about 30–40 in extremely cramped conditions. By the second month out, the ship was being buffeted by strong westerly gales, causing the ship's timbers to be badly shaken with caulking failing to keep out sea water, and with passengers, even in their berths, lying wet and ill. This, combined with a lack of proper rations and unsanitary conditions for several months, contributed to what would eventually be fatal for many, especially the majority of women. On the way, there were two deaths, a crew member and a passenger, but the worst was yet to come after arriving at their destination when, in the space of several months, almost half the passengers perished in the cold, harsh New England winter.

On November 9/19, 1620, after about three months at sea, including a month of delays in England, they spotted land, which was the Cape Cod hook, now called Provincetown Harbor. After several days of trying to get south to their planned destination of the Colony of Virginia, strong winter seas forced them to return to the harbor at Cape Cod hook, where they anchored on November 11/21. Billington signed the Mayflower Compact that day.

== Life in Plymouth colony ==
The Billington family appeared a number of times in the accounts of early Plymouth Colony and were reported to be the colony's troublemakers. Francis made squibs and fired a musket in the Mayflower while the ship was anchored off Cape Cod. Francis went exploring soon after their arrival and discovered the body of water now known as Billington Sea.

In March 1621 John Senior challenged Myles Standish's orders for "contempt of the Captain's lawful command with several speeches" and was punished for it. He would do this many times more.

In May 1621 John Billington (the younger) became lost in some woods for several days, eventually being returned home by some natives from Nauset on Cape Cod.

In 1624 John Billington was implicated in the Oldham-Lyford scandal (a revolt against the rule of the Plymouth church), but insisted he was innocent and was never officially punished.

In 1625 Governor Bradford wrote a letter to Robert Cushman saying "Billington still rails against you…he is a knave, and so will live and die."

== Death ==
In September 1630 John Billington was tried by a jury and hanged for the murder of John Newcomen, whom he saw as an enemy. This was the first such execution in Plymouth colony. Bradford states he was approximately forty years of age. His burial location is unknown. Nathaniel Mourton, colony secretary from 1645 to 1685, indicated that Billington saw Newcomen robbing his traps.

== Family ==
John Billington married Elinor (Bradford) in England. They had two sons. In 1636, she was sentenced to sit in the stocks and be whipped for slandering John Doane. After John's death, Elinor married Gregory Armstrong in September 1638. Elinor died after March 2, 1642/3. Gregory Armstrong died in Plymouth on November 5, 1650.

It is possible that Elinor was born Elinor Longland, sister of Francis Longland, as the Billington's son Francis was included in a three-life lease with Francis Longland and a nephew of Francis Longland for land in the manor of Spalding in Lincolnshire, implying that Francis Billington was also a nephew of Longland's. However, despite extensive research, no other evidence has been found.

Children of John and Elinor Billington:

- John, born about 1604. He died in Plymouth between May 22, 1627, and his father's death in 1630.
- Francis, born about 1606. He married Christian (Penn) Eaton in Plymouth in July 1634 and had nine children. A survey in 1650 indicated that Francis Billington was then in New England. He died in Middleboro on December 3, 1684 and is buried at Nemasket Hill Cemetery.
