= Killing of Molly Bish =

Unsolved 2000 child murder in Warren, Massachusetts, U.S.

- 1997 photo of Molly Bish
- Location: Warren, Massachusetts, U.S.
- Date: June 27, 2000
- Attack type: Child murder, child abduction
- Victim: Molly Bish
- Perpetrator: Unknown

The murder of Molly Anne Bish is an unsolved child murder that occurred in Warren, Massachusetts, after 16-year-old high-school student Molly Anne Bish disappeared while working as a lifeguard on June 27, 2000.

Her disappearance led to the most extensive and expensive search for a missing person ever undertaken in the state of Massachusetts. In June 2003, Bish's remains were found in Hampden County, 5 mi (8 km) from her family home. Police believe that Bish was abducted and murdered, and several suspects have been publicly identified. However, Bish's abduction and murder case remains unsolved.

== Disappearance ==
In the summer of 2000, 16-year-old Molly Anne Bish (born August 2, 1983) began working as a lifeguard at Comins Pond in Warren, Massachusetts. On June 26, the day before her disappearance, her mother Magi saw a mustached man in a white car parked in the lot of the beach where Bish's lifeguard post was located. Although the man seemed suspicious at the time, Magi did not fear that her daughter was in danger.

On June 27, Magi took her daughter to Comins Pond and left Bish by the lifeguard station. Magi did not see the suspicious man whom she had spotted the day before. However, another person claimed to have seen a man who looked like the stranger in the parking lot just minutes before Bish arrived. A local worker also mentioned seeing a similar car parked at a cemetery that was linked to the pond by a path. Magi was the last person known to have seen her daughter before she went missing. A few hours later, the police reached out to Bish's parents to inform them that there had not been a lifeguard on duty all day and that Bish's belongings had been left at her station. An extensive search was launched immediately.

== Body discovery ==
In the fall of 2002, after a hunter spotted a blue swimsuit in the woods on Whiskey Hill in Palmer, a thorough search of the area was conducted. On June 9, 2003, Bish's remains were discovered 5 miles (8 km) away from her family home. Although the cause of death could not be established because of the body's decomposition, investigators believe that Bish was murdered.

== Investigation ==
In 2005, a Connecticut man charged with attempted kidnapping in New York was briefly under investigation in connection with the case.

In 2009, a new suspect, Rodney Stanger, was investigated. Stanger had lived in Southbridge, Massachusetts, near Warren, for more than 20 years and moved to Florida one year after the Bish murder. Following the murder of Crystal Morrison, Stanger's girlfriend of 20 years, Morrison's sister alerted the Massachusetts authorities. Stanger was known to have access to a white car similar to the one seen the day before Bish's disappearance. He was also known to fish in Comins Pond and hunt in the woods where Bish's body was found. In addition, Stanger closely matched the description provided by Magi Bish of the man seen in the white sedan the day before her daughter's disappearance. In 2009, when Stanger was being investigated for the Bish murder, police also questioned him in connection with the 1993 murder of Holly Piirainen, who had gone missing in Sturbridge. Bish and Piirainen were the same age in 1993, and Bish had written a letter of hope to Piirainen's parents in 1993. Stanger was not charged in either case.

In November 2011, Gerald Battistoni was named as a suspect. Battistoni served time in prison for repeatedly raping a teenage girl in the early 1990s. He attempted suicide in prison after newspaper articles identified him as a potential suspect in Bish's and Piirainen's deaths. Battistoni, who had a criminal record dating back to 1980, had been in the area where Bish's body was found and resembles a composite sketch of the mysterious man whom Magi had seen in the parking lot. The Bish family, working with a private investigator, asked the state to perform DNA testing. The Massachusetts State Police sent the DNA evidence to Texas. Battistoni died in November 2014.

In 2012, forensic evidence led authorities to name David Pouliot, who had died in 2003, as a person of interest in the Piirainen case.

On June 3, 2021, Joseph Early, the Worcester County district attorney, announced that Francis Sumner was a new person of interest. Sumner, a registered sex offender with a long criminal record, had been found dead inside his home in Spencer, Massachusetts on May 4, 2016. Early did not disclose how Sumner was connected to the case, but he said that investigators had received new information. In 1982, Sumner was convicted of aggravated rape and kidnapping and was sentenced to at least nine years in prison.

To date, there have been no arrests in the case. The search for Bish was the most extensive and expensive in Massachusetts history. Bish's story has been featured on many American television shows, such as Disappeared, America's Most Wanted, Unsolved Mysteries and 48 Hours.

=== 2023 update ===
As the 23rd anniversary of Bish's disappearance approached, Early provided an update. Despite the lack of arrests, Sumner, although dead, remains a person of interest. Early expressed confidence in the ongoing efforts by state police detectives and mentioned the continued testing of evidence with advancements in forensic science. He also emphasized the importance of familial DNA in aiding the investigation and noted his support for legislative changes to facilitate its use. The Bish family continues to advocate for child abduction awareness and the resolution of the case. An anonymous tip line remains open for any information regarding the case.

== In media ==
=== TV ===
- 48 Hours, Season 17 Episode 11- "Missing Molly"
- 48 Hours, Season 38 Episode 12- "Help Find Molly Bish's Killer"
- America's Most Wanted, July 2000
- Disappeared, Season 5- "Murky Waters"
- On the Case with Paula Zahn, "Gone in Less Than 3 Minutes"
- Unsolved Mysteries, Season 14 Episode 106

=== Podcast episodes ===
- 48 Hours podcast, December 8, 2025- "Help Find Molly Bish's Killer"
- Beyond the Ferns, Episode 35, September 12, 2025- "The Cold Case of Molly Bish - Massachusetts"
- The Bourne Investigation, July 10, 2026- "The Murder of Molly Bish"
- Coffee and Cases, Episode 43, September 10, 2020- "Molly Bish"
- Crime and Coffee Couple, January 7, 2024- "The Murder of Molly Bish"
- Crime Whispers, Episode 32, June 29,2021- "The Disappearance of Molly Bish"
- Criminology, June 29, 2019- "Molly Bish"
- Detective Perspective, Episode 50, July 29, 2024- "MURDER: Molly Bish"
- Every Town, February 25, 2022- "Molly Bish - Largest Missing Person's Search - Warren, MA"
- Haunted American History, March 25, 2026- "The Lifeguard's Missing Footprints: The Disappearance of Molly Bish"
- Morbid, Episode 214, March 7, 2021- "The Tragic Case of Molly Bish"
- Morbid, May 13, 2021- "Morbid Chats with Heather Bish"
- Morbid, August 13, 2026- "Episode Revisit- The Tragic Case of Molly Bish & Morbid Chats with Heather Bish"
- A Simpler Time True Crime, April 13, 2026- "Watching and Waiting: The Unsolved Abduction and Murder of Molly Bish Part 1"
- A Simpler Time True Crime, April 14, 2026- "Evil is Everywhere: The Unsolved Abduction and Murder of Molly Bish Part 2"
- The Trail Went Cold, Episode 466, January 21, 2026- "Molly Bish"
- Voices for Justice, June 3, 2021- "Molly Bish"
- Voices for Justice, June 10, 2021- "A Conversation with Heather Bish, Sister of Molly Bish"
- Wicked Deeds, September 23, 2021 - "Molly Bish - 2000 - MA"

== Legacy ==
In 2004, Magi and John Bish founded the Molly Bish Foundation.

== See also ==
- List of homicides in Massachusetts
- List of solved missing person cases (2000s)
- List of unsolved murders (2000–present)
