= New Bedford Highway Killer =

Unidentified serial killer in Massachusetts, United States

Details
- Victims: 11
- Span of crimes: March 1988 – April 1989
- Country: United States
- State: New Bedford, Massachusetts
- Date apprehended: Unapprehended

The New Bedford Highway Killer is an unidentified serial killer responsible for the deaths of at least nine women and the disappearances of two additional women in New Bedford, Massachusetts, between March 1988 and April 1989. The killer is also suspected to have assaulted numerous other women. All the killer's victims were known prostitutes or had struggles with addiction. While the victims were taken from New Bedford, they were all found in different surrounding towns, including Dartmouth, Freetown and Westport, along Massachusetts Route 140.

== Victims ==
1. Robbin Lynn Rhodes, 29, was found on March 28, 1989, along Massachusetts Route 140 southbound in Freetown by a search dog. She is believed to have gone missing sometime in March or April 1988. Rhodes had previously dated suspect Kenneth Ponte. While she was never involved in prostitution, she knew many of the other victims and was friends with victim Mary Rose Santos.
2. Rochelle Clifford Dopierala, 28, of Falmouth, disappeared sometime during late April 1988. Her body was found on December 10, 1988, in a gravel pit along Reed Road beneath a tree grove, about two miles from Interstate 195 by people riding ATVs. She was partially clothed and had been beaten to death. She had dated and stayed at the home of suspect Kenneth Ponte, who was arrested for her murder. This was the only time charges were brought in this case. Rochelle had testified against another man who had raped her, but he is not suspected in this case. She was last seen with victim Nancy Paiva's boyfriend, an ex-convict. He was cleared in both deaths and is not a suspect.
3. Deborah Lynn McConnell, 25, of Newport, was last seen sometime in May 1988 by her father after the funeral of her mother at the local cemetery. She is believed to have been the third victim. Her body was found on December 1, 1988, off Massachusetts Route 140 northbound in Freetown, through a cadaver dog search. She was found nude with a bra wrapped around her neck.
4. Debra Medeiros, 29, of Fall River, was last seen by her boyfriend in New Bedford after a fight and was reported missing on May 27, 1988. She was the first of the bodies found and was identified in December 1988. Her body was found on July 3, 1988, by a woman who went to relieve herself just in the woods on the side of the road on Massachusetts Route 140. Her remains were severely decomposed with her body positioned on her back with her feet pointed towards the highway. Her cause of death was strangulation; she had a bra wrapped around her neck. Her boyfriend was ruled out as a suspect.
5. Christina Monteiro, 19, was last seen sometime in May 1988 and has not been heard from since.
6. Marilyn Cardoza-Roberts, 34, was last seen sometime in June 1988 and has not been heard from since. She was reported missing in December 1988. She was neighbors with Monteiro.
7. Nancy Lee Paiva, 36, of New Bedford, was last seen walking home from a bar called Whisper’s Pub on July 7, 1988, after a reported fight with her boyfriend in the South End in the early hours of the morning. Her nude body was discovered beside Interstate 195 in Dartmouth on July 30, 1988, by two men who were riding motorcycles. Her body was found in the same position as victim Debra Medeiro's – on her back with her feet pointing towards the highway. Nancy's cause of death was also believed to be strangulation. Her boyfriend is not a suspect in her death.
8. Debra Greenlaw Demello, 35, was last seen in New Bedford, on July 11, 1988. Her body was found off the eastbound Reed Road ramp of Interstate 195 by a state highway crew on November 8, 1988. Debra's nude body was in an area with trees with her clothing strewn in the branches. She was found with some belongings of another victim, Nancy Paiva.
9. Mary Rose Santos, 26, of New Bedford, was dropped off on July 16, 1988, by her husband, with whom she had recently reconciled, near the downtown bus station and last seen dancing at The Old Quarterdeck Lounge five hours later. Santos’ nude body was found with a beer bottle on March 31, 1989, along Massachusetts Route 88 in Westport by two boys. Suspect Kenneth Ponte had represented Santos in a civil case and helped her husband make flyers after her disappearance.
10. Sandra Botelho, 24, reportedly left her apartment on August 11, 1988, at 11 p.m. and never returned. She was the final body found, located in the woods along Interstate 195 in Marion on April 24, 1989. Her body was nude and reportedly was folded into a fetal position.
11. Dawn Mendes, 25, was last seen in New Bedford, on September 4, 1988, walking from her apartment to a family christening party. Her body was found on November 29, 1988, on the westbound Reed Road ramp off Interstate 195 by a search dog. There were mostly skeletal remains but her hand was able to yield a fingerprint which led to her being identified.

== Suspects ==
=== Anthony DeGrazia ===
In May 1989, a photo of Anthony DeGrazia, a 26-year-old construction worker, was presented to a locally known New Bedford sex worker in the Weld Square area of New Bedford, Massachusetts. The sex worker, Margret Medeiros, described her assailant as having a boxer-like build with a flat nose. However, she never identified DeGrazia as a positive suspect, only stating to the detective that he looked like the man who tried to choke her. Medeiros, then 22 years old, was brought before a secret grand jury to testify about her attacker. She stated to the grand jury that DeGrazia looked like the man who attacked her and tried to choke her.

DeGrazia was later picked up for questioning and brought before the secret grand jury but was never indicted. Later, District Attorney Ronald Pina asked the court judge for a warrant for DeGrazia's arrest, accusing him of 17 attempted rapes and assaults on several other sex workers in the Weld Street area. After DeGrazia was notified about the warrant for his arrest, he and his defense attorney, Edward Harrington, Esq., of New Bedford (no relation to the presiding Judge on the case), surrendered to the courts. DeGrazia was then arrested, and formally charged with 17 rapes and assaults.

The judge presiding over the case, Judge Edward Harrington, set DeGrazia's bail at $180,000.00, in addition to a one million dollar surety bond. DeGrazia, not being able to make this bail, would spend the next 13 months in the county jail on the charges brought against him by District Attorney Ronald Pina. DeGrazia would have 18 court appearances during his 13 months of incarceration in the county jail. DeGrazia's defense attorney filed 18 motions before the court for the production of documents of evidence, including a request for a bail reduction because of an alleged lack of evidence produced against DeGrazia by the district attorney's office. Each motion was denied by the presiding judge.

Finally, DeGrazia fired Harrington and hired a Boston attorney by the name of Robert A. George, Esq. George filed a motion of contempt against the DA's office for non-production of evidence. This resulted in the judge lowering DeGrazia's bail.

DeGrazia was released from jail on June 27, 1990. Immediately after DeGrazia was released on bail, he was re-arrested for allegedly uttering threats to the DA Ronald Pina for wrongful prosecution and imprisonment. DeGrazia again posted bond, and was re-released.

DeGrazia was later found dead one month after his release on July 17, 1990. His body was found at the home of the parents of his ex-girlfriend, in Freetown, lying face down under a picnic table in their back yard. His death was ruled a homicide by Freetown Police who first arrived on the scene. However, the District Attorney's office later ruled his death a suicide. The autopsy report does not support this decision made by the district attorney's office. The autopsy report ruled DeGrazia's death a homicide. DeGrazia's death came immediately after a Special Prosecutor released Kenneth Ponte as the prime suspect in the serial murder investigation.

Authorities stated in a public broadcast that it was a timely thing that DeGrazia took his own life after being made aware that he was now being considered the number one prime suspect in connection to the New Bedford highway serial murders. Later, this statement made against DeGrazia by the state's Special Prosecutor Paul Buckley was retracted by the D.A's office. The family of DeGrazia believes Anthony DeGrazia was murdered, and has filed a lawsuit alleging this.

=== Kenneth Charles Ponte ===
Kenneth Ponte is the only person ever arrested for the murders. In August 1990, a grand jury indicted New Bedford attorney Kenneth Ponte, 40, in the murder of Rochelle Clifford Dopierala, who had been beaten to death. Ponte had a checkered past, including drug use and a prior incident involving Dopierala. Bristol County District Attorney Ronald Pina suggested that Ponte had murdered Dopierala because she was allegedly planning to expose his drug activities.

Dopierala's mother stated that her daughter had once given her telephone number to Ponte in the event she needed to be reached. Ponte admitted to having represented Dopierala in April 1988, shortly before she disappeared, when she accused another man of raping her.

Ponte moved to Port Richey, Florida, in September 1988. He was arraigned on a single count of murder on August 17, 1990. Ponte entered a plea of "absolutely not guilty" and posted a $50,000 bond. On July 29, 1991, the district attorney dropped murder charges against Ponte, citing lack of evidence. The following year, remaining drug and assault charges were dropped and the New Bedford case went cold.

Ponte resurfaced in the news in May 2009 in two separate incidents. Police dug up the driveway and patio of Ponte's former New Bedford home with a backhoe, but were unable to find evidence linking Ponte to any crime. On the morning of May 15, Ponte was arrested for shoplifting and was found with four cans of sardines and a block of cheese stolen from a PriceRite store in New Bedford. On January 27, 2010, Ponte was found dead in his New Bedford home. The Bristol County District Attorney's office has discounted foul play as a cause of death.

=== Daniel Tavares ===
While in prison for the murder of his mother, Daniel Thomas Tavares Jr. sent a threatening letter to one of the prison staff indirectly claiming responsibility for the Highway Killings. He lived in New Bedford, and had knowledge of where another murdered woman, Gayle Botelho, had been buried, within a mile from his home. He was convicted of the November 2007 murders of his neighbors, Brian and Beverly Mauck. In 2015, he was convicted of the murder of Gayle Botelho.

=== Lisbon Ripper ===
Between 1992 and 1993, three sex workers were slain and disemboweled with an instrument that was not a knife in Lisbon, Portugal, by an unknown serial killer that was dubbed the Lisbon Ripper, while two further sex workers were shot dead on the opposite shore of the Tagus river in the same time period. In March 1993, two detectives of the Portuguese Policia Judiciaria traveled to New Bedford to gather information on the Highway killings, while two agents of the FBI traveled to Lisbon, following a hypothesis that the string of crimes on both sides of the Atlantic could have been committed by the same individual. New Bedford has a sizable Portuguese community and many of the Highway victims were of Portuguese ancestry. The Lisbon murders were also linked to four similar killings that took place in Belgium, the Netherlands, Denmark and the Czech Republic (all countries bordering Germany) between 1993 and 1997, the theory being that the Lisbon Ripper had then become a long-haul truck driver.

In 2011, a 21-year-old man named Joel applied to participate in the Portuguese edition of the reality show Secret Story, where participants try to guess each other's secrets while concealing their own. The secret he applied with was that his father, José Pedro Guedes, was the Lisbon Ripper. Guedes, 46, was arrested and confessed to the three slayings, but could not be prosecuted because murder has a prescription period of 15 years in Portugal and the murders had ended in 2008. Guedes could still be prosecuted for the 2000 murder of a prostitute in Aveiro, Portugal and similar murders in Germany (or neighboring countries) where Guedes resided in the 1990s. It is unknown however, if Guedes ever resided in the United States. Guedes was tried for the Aveiro murder in 2013, found not proven due to lack of evidence.

== See also ==
- List of fugitives from justice who disappeared
- List of serial killers by number of victims
- List of serial killers in the United States
