= Andrew Puopolo =

American football player and murder victim

Andrew P. Puopolo was a Harvard University football player and the victim in one of the most highly publicized Boston murder cases of the 1970s.

== Early life ==
Puopolo grew up in the Jamaica Plain section of Boston and graduated from the prestigious Boston Latin School before enrolling at Harvard. A senior and the starting cornerback for the Crimson during the 1976 season, he was scheduled to graduate the following spring with a degree in biology. He was planning to attend medical school.

== Murder ==
On Tuesday November 15, 1976, Puopolo and a group of his Harvard Crimson teammates spent the evening out. During the early morning hours of November 16, Puopolo's teammate Charlie Kaye was approached by a prostitute while he was sitting in a van. Reaching into the van, the prostitute distracted Kaye by fondling him and then stole his wallet. As the prostitute ran away, Puopolo pursued her. Three men came to the aid of the woman, and in the ensuing altercation one of the men stabbed Puopolo.

Deprived of oxygen as a result of his injuries, Puopolo suffered extensive brain damage. He remained in a coma for 31 days before suffering a fatal heart attack on December 17, 1976. He died while still attached to the respirator that had been keeping him alive.

== Trial ==
The three men convicted of Puopolo's murder were all black and appealed their first degree murder convictions in part on a claim that the prosecution used peremptory challenges to exclude blacks from the jury. The Massachusetts Supreme Judicial Court remanded the case for new trial after finding that eleven of twelve deliberating jurors were white.

Two of the three men were found not guilty on their retrial, with the third being sentenced to twenty years for manslaughter. One man found innocent in the aforementioned trial, has sued the now defunct Boston Underground News for libel, after having been denied employment at an unnamed local convenience store, supposedly due to false allegations published by the defendant. The case was eventually settled out of court for an undisclosed sum.

== Aftermath ==
Scholarships at both Boston Latin and Harvard as well as an athletic field in Boston's North End are all named in memory of Andrew Puopolo.

== See also ==
- List of homicides in Massachusetts
