= Main South Woodsman =

Unidentified serial killer

Details
- Victims: 3–5
- Span of crimes: 2002 – 2004 (possibly until 2007)
- Country: United States
- State: Massachusetts

The Main South Woodsman is an unidentified serial killer who murdered between three and five prostitutes in Worcester, Massachusetts, from 2002 to 2007. His nickname derives from the Main South neighborhood, where he picked up most of his victims.

The prime suspect in the murders, Alex Scesny, was identified in 2008, due to the fact he had a history of sexual abuse and was suspected in the murder of a sex worker. Although convicted of the aforementioned offenses, he has never been charged in the Main South Woodsman cases, all of which remain unsolved.

== Murders ==
All of the Woodsman's known victims were Hispanic women with slim builds, short statures, dark hair color and aged between 29 and 42 at the time of their deaths. Each of them engaged in prostitution in some way, and suffered from drug addiction.

- The killer's first confirmed victim was 29-year-old Carmen Rudy, who went missing from Worcester on September 30, 2002. She had two children. Rudy suffered from a drug addiction for which she underwent treatment at the Linda Fay Griffin House, a substance abuse treatment facility. Her skeletonized remains were discovered almost a year after her disappearance on September 29, 2003, on the campus of the Hillside School in Marlborough.
- A few dozen meters away from where Rudy's remains were discovered, authorities also located the skeletal remains of 29-year-old Betzaida Montalvo, who had gone missing in April 2003. She was a mother of five children who had a history of prostitution due to addiction as a criminal record for possessing drugs. She had been released from a jail in Framingham in December 2002. Initially, Montalvo's identity could not be established due to the severe decomposition of her body, due to which she was named "Jane Doe No. 1" in the criminal case. In September 2003, forensic scientists reconstructed her skull and then distributed a digital rendition of what her face supposedly looked like, in addition to releasing information about her clothing and jewelry. When this failed to generate leads, her remains were sent to a Smithsonian Institution in the District of Columbia in December 2003, A DNA swab test was collected from victim's youngest daughter that led to the tentative identification of Montalvo as the decedent. She was conclusively identified in April 2004, after her relatives provided a DNA sample that was matched to the remains. During the investigation, police located a witness, 59-year-old Worcester resident Joseph Parson, who claimed that he knew Carmen Rudy and that he had seen her in the company of Montalvo.
- On March 3, 2004, the body of 33-year-old Dinelia Torres, missing since the fall of 2003, was found in a wooded area near Hudson, approximately two kilometers away from where the previous victims' remains had been found. Like Rudy and Montalvo, she had a history of prostitution and drug abuse. As a teenager, Torres gave birth to a child and dropped out of school, and after the baby's father left her, she developed a drug addiction. She was prosecuted for car theft in 1994, and eventually signed over guardianship of her three children to her parents. In the early 2000s, Torres was treated in the same treatment facility as Rudy, but there is no evidence to indicate that the two women knew each other.

=== Suspected victims ===
- In the early morning hours of September 5, 2004, 42-year-old Wendy A. Morrello was at home with a friend of hers when she suddenly ran out of the front door and disappeared. According to her friend, she had not slept for several days due to her heavy intake of drugs and hallucinations. Eight days later, her body was found in York, Maine, and she was identified via her tattoos. Strangely, she was found fully clothed and her jewelry had not been stolen. Like the other victims, Morello had a history of prostitution and drug abuse, having been convicted of drug possession in 1995. She had two children, but spent the last years of her life being repeatedly incarcerated, living on the streets or with acquaintances. Her cause of death was not revealed, as the police claimed that it would compromise their investigation and any possible connection she might have had with the other victims.
- On September 4, 2007, the remains of 35-year-old Lineida Oliveira were found in the woods near Rutland. A mother of eleven children, she went missing in January of that year, two weeks after giving birth to twin girls. Relatives filed a missing persons report in May, claiming that Oliveira was homeless and had chronic drug problems dating back to 1997. According to her family, she arrived on the mainland from Puerto Rico in 1988, and by 1999 had six children, who were then taken away by CPS due to her lifestyle. During the investigation, investigators were inclined to believe that the killer was a person known to the victim, because according to her sister Marilyn, before going on a date with a young man, Oliveira would leave his details and cell phone number in case it was a stranger, but this time did not. This led them to believe that the last person to see her alive, who likely killed her, was probably personally acquainted with her.

== Investigation ==
In order to solve the case, the FBI formed a task force, and with the help from profilers based in New Jersey, they made a psychological profile of the suspect. According to the profile, the perpetrator was likely a blue-collar worker (possibly a construction worker, maintenance worker or truck driver); aged 28–41; fond of fishing and hunting; likely drove a pickup truck or sport utility vehicle; from a dysfunctional family where he possibly experienced physical or sexual abuse that led to him developing feelings of hatred towards his mother; unmarried; addicted to pornography and frequented Worcester's red-light districts. Experts also speculated that he lived in Worcester or neighboring cities for a long time, had possibly been incarcerated before, was a voyeur and tortured animals.

=== Alex Scesny ===
In May 2008, the Worcester County District Attorney's Office announced that they had a prime suspect - 38-year-old Alex F. Scesny, a resident of Berlin who had recently been charged with the rape of a female friend in West Boylston and the cold case murder of 39-year-old prostitute Theresa K. Stone, who had been beaten and strangled to death in Fitchburg in 1996.

Since 1996, Scesny displayed aggressive behavior towards women and had been arrested on several occasions for assault and rape. In 1996, he was arrested on charges of beating a prostitute, rape and attempted strangulation of a woman, and sexually assaulting a young girl. However, some of the charges were later dropped after the victims failed to appear in court, and the rest were reduced, due to which he received a relatively lenient sentence.

In 2002, Scesny was indicted for the rape of a girl in Harwich, whom he had attempted to strangle with a necktie. He was eventually arrested and almost went to trial, but because his victim died, the charges against him were dropped and the criminal case closed, as the charges hinged solely on the rape victim's testimony. In addition, it was found that Scesny's family owned a farm in Marlborough, which was coincidentally near the school where the remains of Rudy, Montalvo and Torres were found. Scesny himself lived in the city at the time, and was reportedly well acquainted with the area.

=== Prosecution, conviction and status ===
When interrogated about the Woodsman murders, Scesny categorically refused to cooperate and denied guilt. In the spring of 2012, he was convicted for the murder of Stone and sentenced to life imprisonment, but was acquitted of the West Boylston rape. He attempted to have his conviction overturned in 2015, but did not succeed.

As of March 2025, Scesny has not been charged with any of the other murders, although he remains a suspect. Currently, both the confirmed and suspected murders all remain unsolved.

== See also ==
- List of serial killers in the United States
