= Murder of Christa Worthington =

American fashion writer (1956–2002)

Christa Worthington (December 23, 1956 – January 6, 2002) was a United States fashion writer who worked for Women's Wear Daily, Cosmopolitan, ELLE, Harper's Bazaar, and The New York Times. She was also a co-author of several books on fashion.

Worthington was stabbed to death at her home in Truro, Massachusetts (on Cape Cod). Her body was found on January 6, 2002, with her two-year-old daughter, Ava, clinging to it. The child was unharmed.

On April 15, 2005, a local garbage collector, Christopher McCowen, was arrested and charged with her rape and murder. McCowen had lived on Cape Cod since about 1998 and had been a garbage collector whose regular route included Worthington's home. McCowen was charged on the basis of genetic fingerprinting and incriminating statements he made during a police interview.

On November 16, 2006, he was found guilty in Barnstable Superior Court of first-degree murder, aggravated rape, and aggravated armed burglary. He was sentenced to life without parole.

In January 2008, a hearing was held to determine whether racism was a factor in the jury's decision to convict McCowen. Three jury members testified separately that fellow jurors made racist remarks during deliberations. In December 2010, the Massachusetts Supreme Judicial Court denied an appeal for a new trial.

== See also ==
- List of homicides in Massachusetts
